= Sesekushi Station =

Railway station in Kagoshima, Kagoshima Prefecture, Japan

Sesekushi Station 瀬々串駅
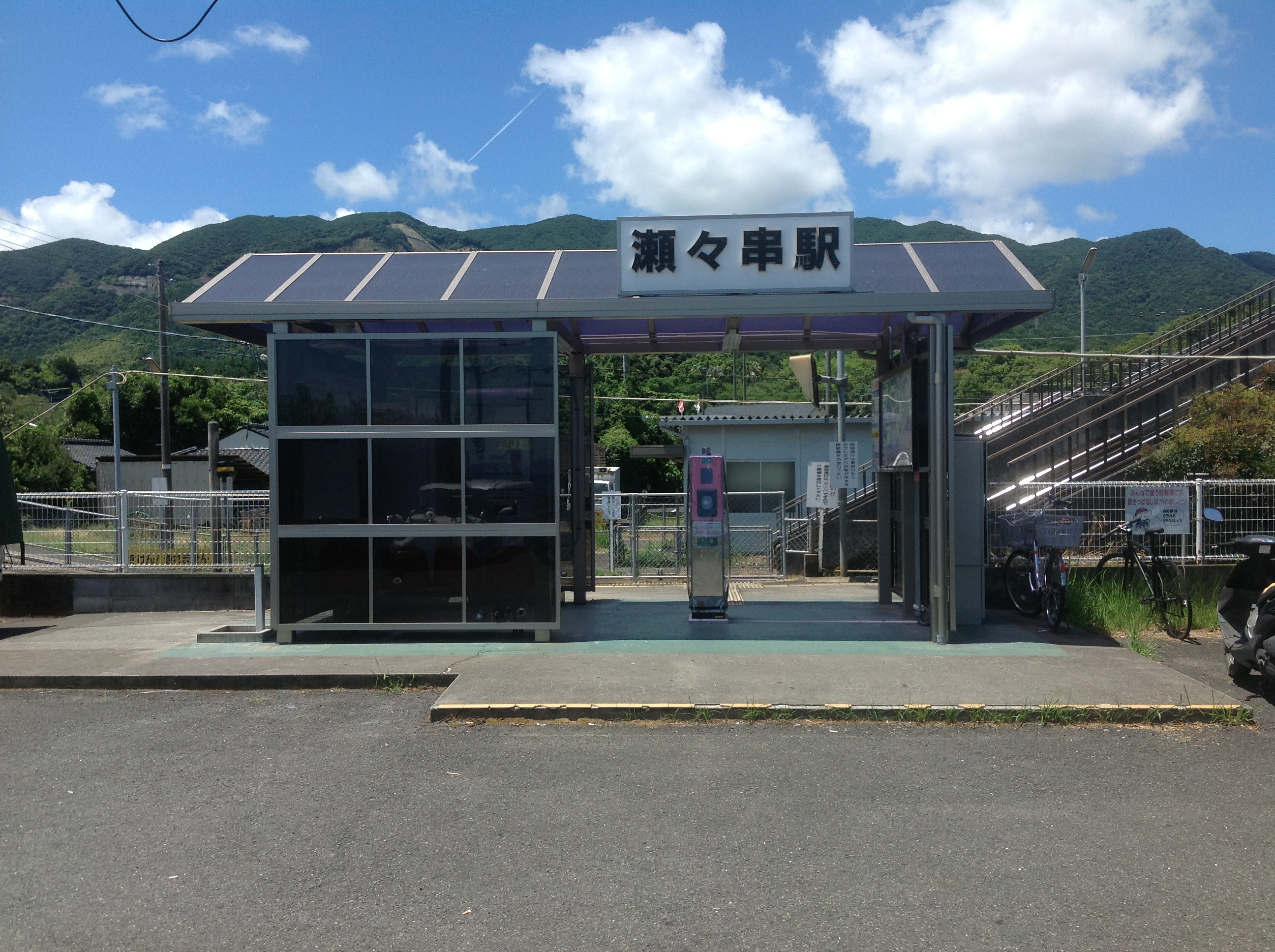
- Sesekushi Station

General information
- Location: 3313 Kiire Sesekushi-chō, Kagoshima-shi, Kagoshima-ken 891-0201; Japan
- Coordinates: 31°25′17″N 130°31′22″E
- Operator: JR Kyushu
- Line: ■ Ibusuki Makurazaki Line
- Distance: 20.6 km from Kagoshima-Chūō
- Platforms: 2 side platforms

Other information
- Status: Unstaffed
- Website: Official website

History
- Opened: 20 May 1934

Passengers
- FY2015: 184 daily

Services
| Preceding station | JR Kyushu | Following station |
|---|---|---|
| Hirakawa towards Kagoshima-Chūō | Ibusuki Makurazaki Line | Nakamyō towards Makurazaki |
Location
- Location within Kagoshima Prefecture Location within Japan

Sesekushi Station (瀬々串駅, Sesekushi-eki) is a passenger railway station located in the city of Ibusuki, Kagoshima Prefecture, Japan. It is operated by JR Kyushu.

== Lines ==
The station is served by the Ibusuki Makurazaki Line and is located 20.6 km from the starting point of the line at Kagoshima-Chūō.

== Layout ==
This is an above-ground station with two opposed side platforms, connected by a footbridge. The station is unattended.

=== Platforms ===
| 1 | ■ Ibusuki Makurazaki Line | for Ibusuki and Makurazaki |
| 2 | ■ Ibusuki Makurazaki Line | for Kagoshima-Chūō |

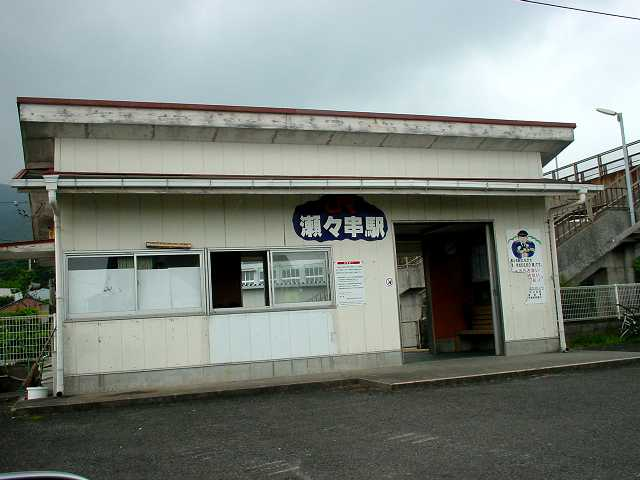
Former station building demolished in 2008

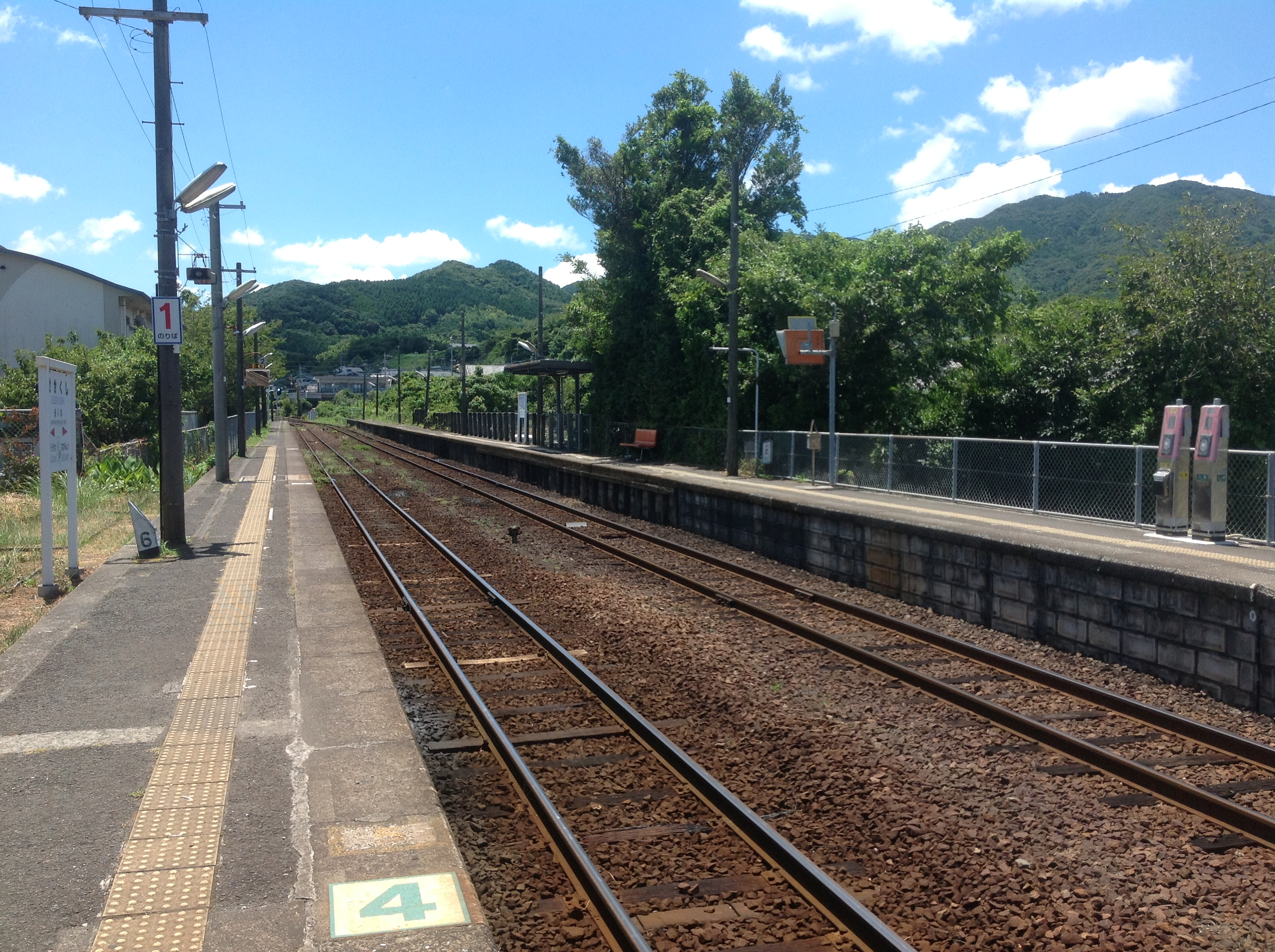
Platform

== History ==
Japanese Government Railways (JGR) had opened the then Ibusuki Line (指宿線) from Nishi-Kagoshima (now Kagoshima-Chūō to Goino on 7 December 1930. In the next phase of expansion, the track was extended south, with Seskushi opening on 20 May 1934. On 31 October 1963, the line which served the station was renamed the Ibusuki Makurazaki Line. With the privatization of Japanese National Railways (JNR), the successor of JGR, on 1 April 1987, the station came under the control of JR Kyushu.

== Passenger statistics ==
In fiscal 2020, the station was used by an average of 184 passengers daily (boarding passengers only), and it ranked 226th among the busiest stations of JR Kyushu.

== Surrounding area ==
- Japan National Route 226
- Kagoshima City Sesekushi Elementary School
- Sesekushi Post office

== See also ==
- List of railway stations in Japan
