= Taniyama Station (JR Kyushu) =

Railway station in Kagoshima, Kagoshima Prefecture, Japan

Taniyama Station 谷山駅
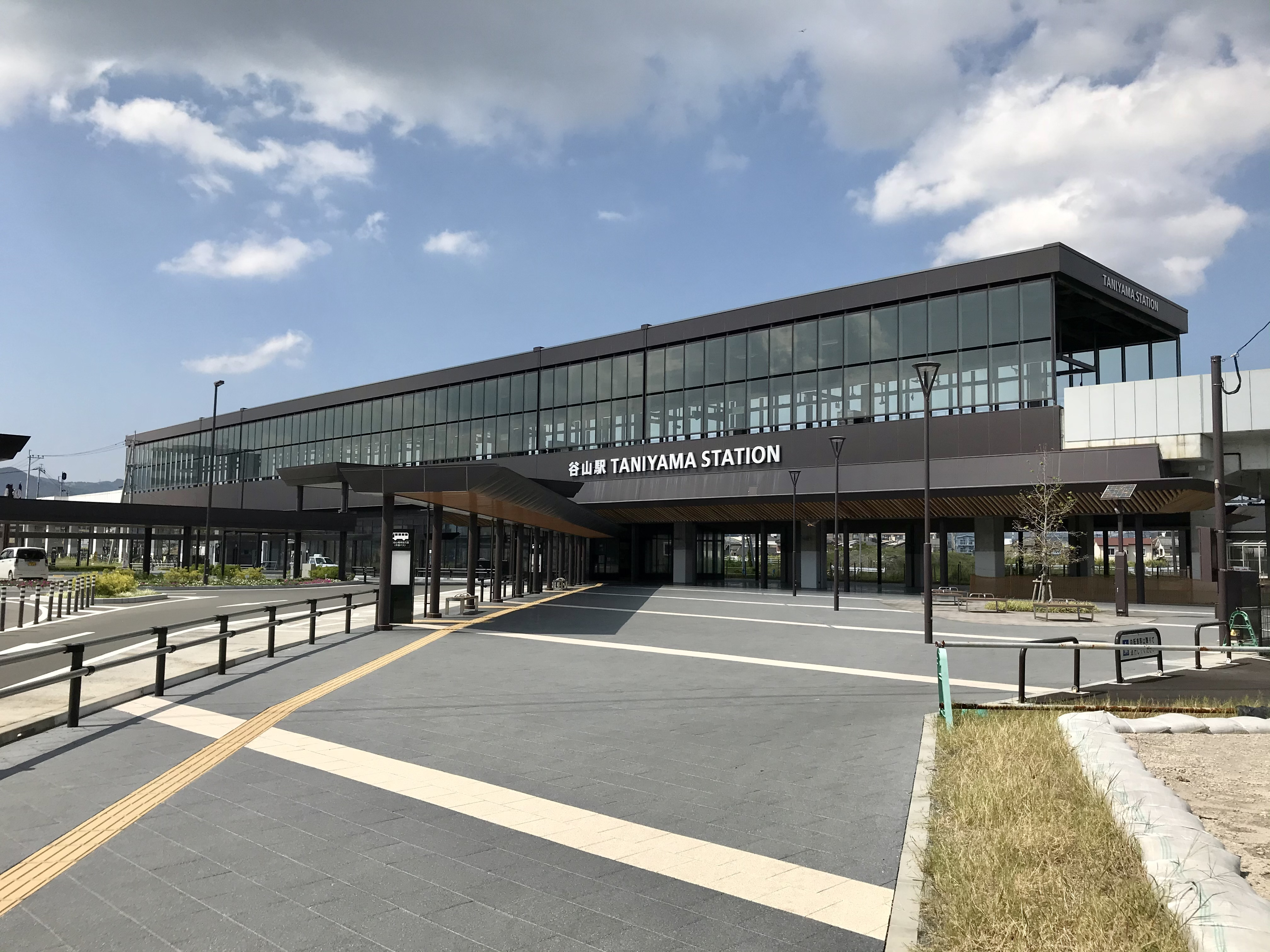
- Taniyama Station in 2020

General information
- Location: Taniyama-Chūō 1-Chōme, Kagoshima-shi, Kagoshima-ken 891-0141; Japan
- Coordinates: 31°31′37″N 130°31′9″E
- Operator: JR Kyushu
- Line: ■ Ibusuki Makurazaki Line
- Distance: 7.5 km from Kagoshima-Chūō
- Platforms: 1 island platforms

Other information
- Status: Staffed (Midori no Madoguchi)
- Website: Official website

History
- Opened: 7 December 1930

Passengers
- FY2020: 2546 daily

Services
Preceding station	JR Kyushu	Following station
Usuki towards Kagoshima-Chūō	Ibusuki Makurazaki Line	Jigenji towards Makurazaki
Location
- Location within Kagoshima Prefecture Location within Japan

Taniyama Station (谷山駅, Taniyama-eki) is a passenger railway station located in the city of Kagoshima, Kagoshima Prefecture, Japan. It is operated by JR Kyushu.

== Lines ==
The station is served by the Ibusuki Makurazaki Line and is located 7.5 km from the starting point of the line at Kagoshima-Chūō.

== Layout ==
The station consists of one elevated island platform with the station facilities underneath. The station has a staffed Midori no Madoguchi ticket office.

=== Platforms ===
1	■ Ibusuki Makurazaki Line	for Ibusuki and Makurazaki
2	■ Ibusuki Makurazaki Line	for Kagoshima-Chūō

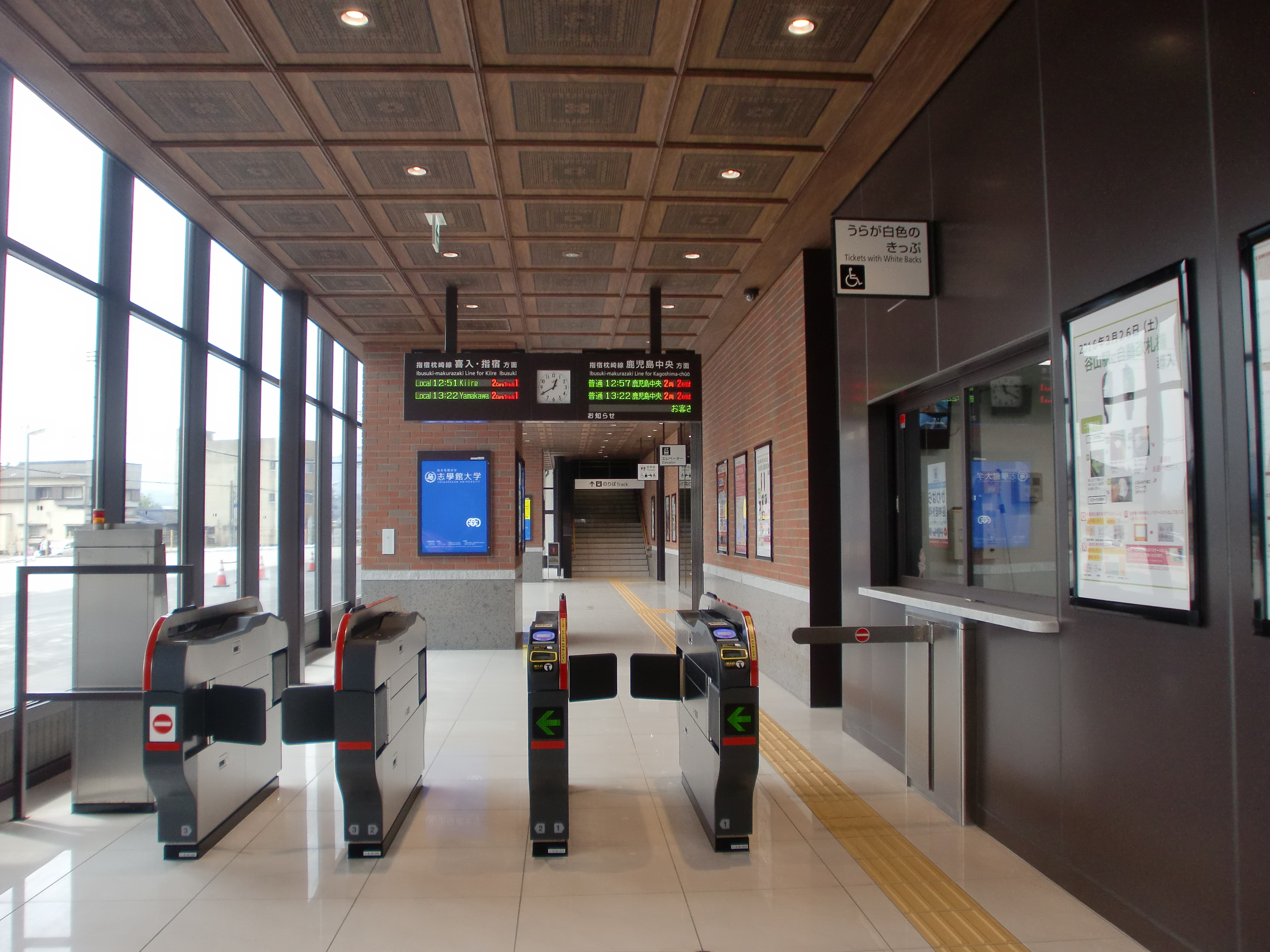
Exit Gate

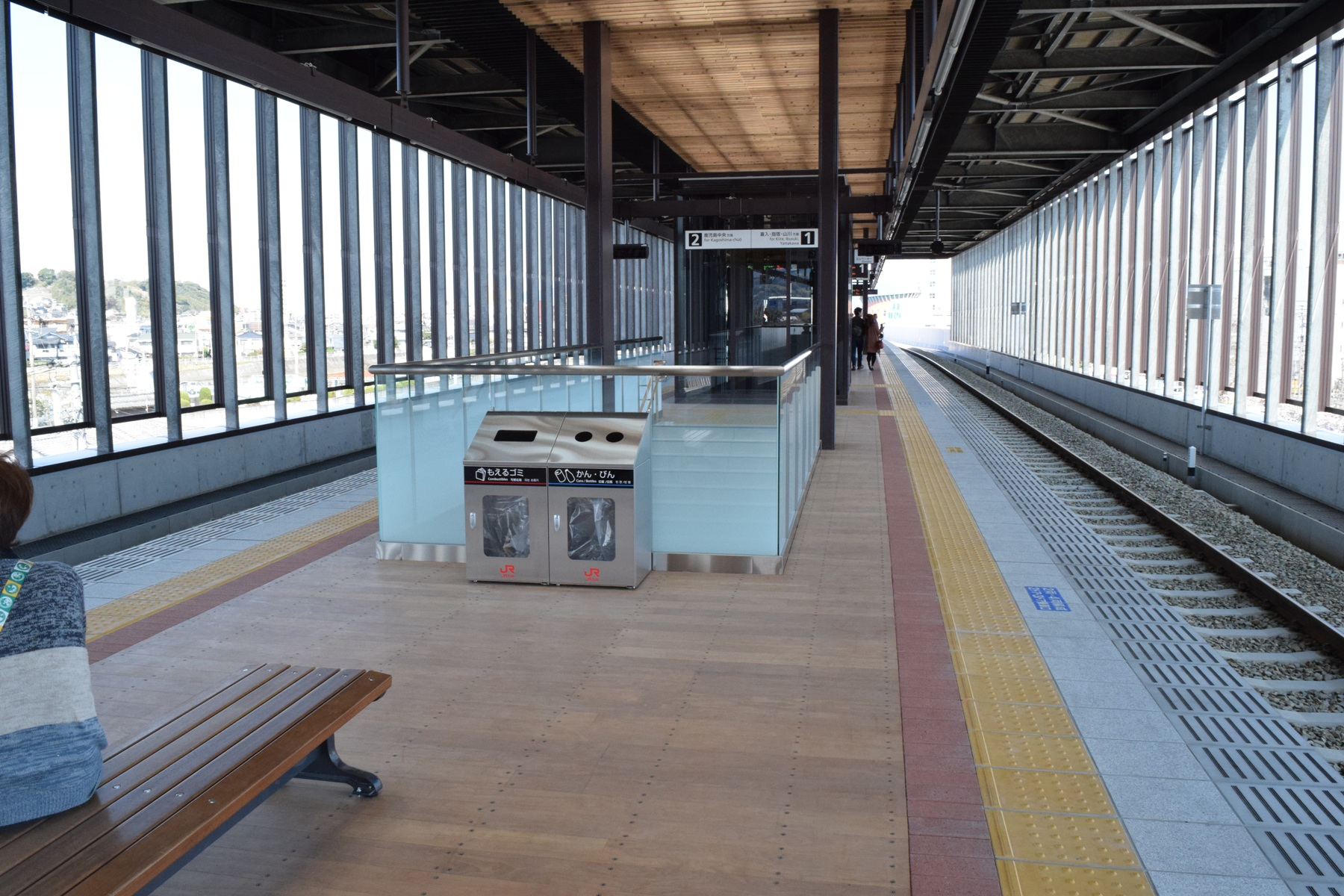
Platform

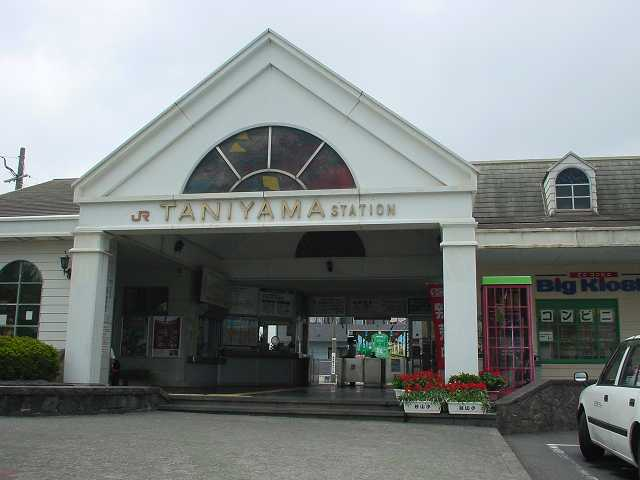
former statuon building in 2011

== History ==
The station was opened when the Japanese Government Railways (JGR) opened the then Ibusuki Line (指宿線) from Nishi-Kagoshima (now Kagoshima-Chūō to Goino on 7 December 1930. On 31 October 1963, the line which served the station was renamed the Ibusuki Makurazaki Line. With the privatization of Japanese National Railways (JNR), the successor of JGR, on 1 April 1987, the station came under the control of JR Kyushu.

== Passenger statistics ==
In fiscal 2020, the station was used by an average of 2546 passengers daily (boarding passengers only), and it ranked 57th among the busiest stations of JR Kyushu.

== Surrounding area ==
- Kagoshima City Hall Taniyama Branch (former Taniyama City Hall)
- Kagoshima Prefectural Kagoshima Minami High School
- Kagoshima Prefectural Kaiyo High School

== See also ==
- List of railway stations in Japan
