= Nakamyō Station =

Railway station in Kagoshima, Kagoshima Prefecture, Japan

Nakamyō Station 中名駅
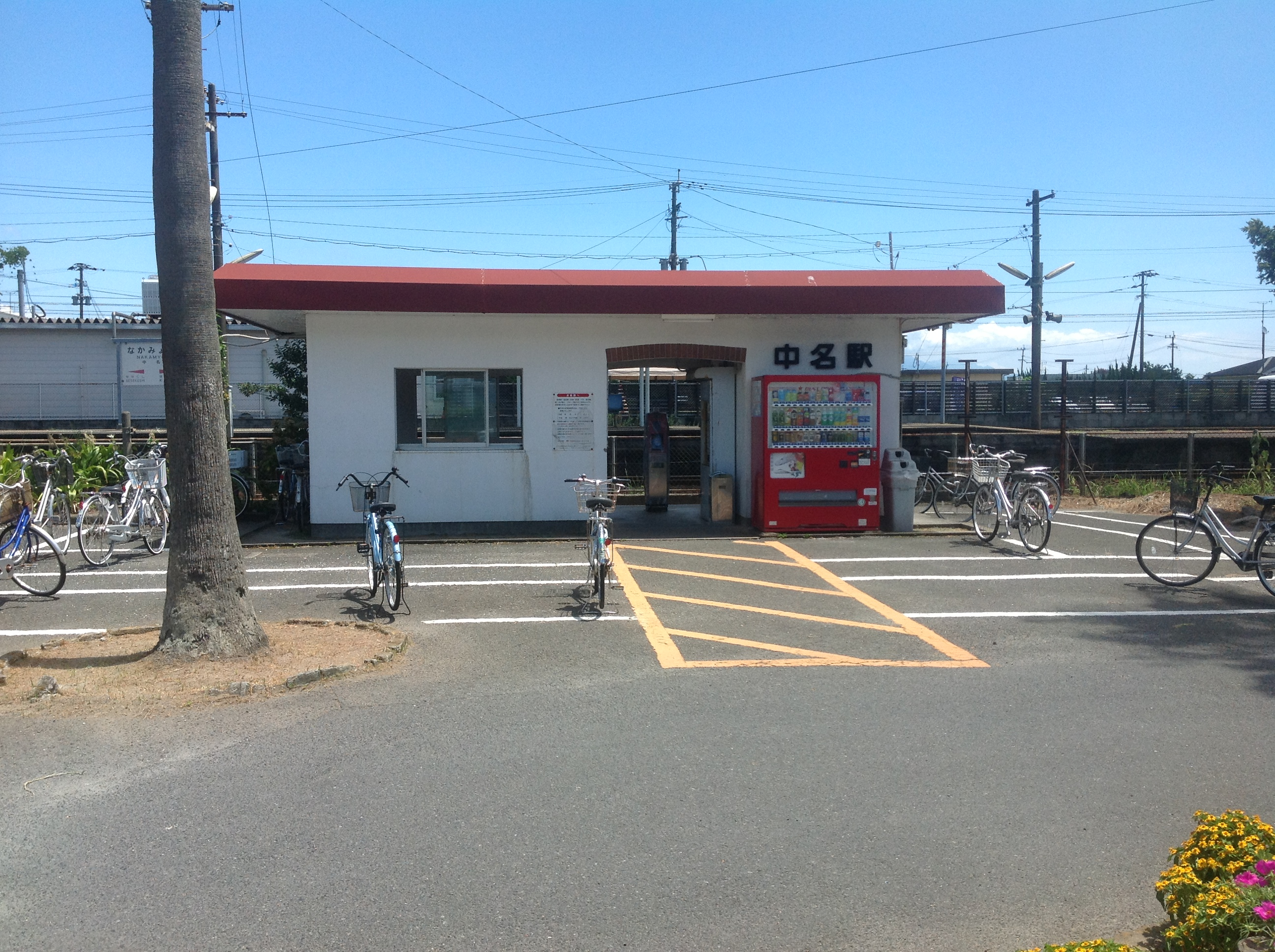
- Nakamyō Station in 2013

General information
- Location: 885 Kiire Nakamyō-chō, Kagoshima-shi, Kagoshima-ken, 891-0202; Japan
- Coordinates: 31°23′37″N 130°32′7″E
- Operator: JR Kyushu
- Line: ■ Ibusuki Makurazaki Line
- Distance: 24.0 km from Kagoshima-Chūō
- Platforms: 1 island platform

Other information
- Status: Unstaffed
- Website: Official website

History
- Opened: 20 May 1934

Passengers
- FY2015: 165 daily

Services
Preceding station	JR Kyushu	Following station
Sesekushi towards Kagoshima-Chūō	Ibusuki Makurazaki Line	Kiire towards Makurazaki
Location
- Location within Kagoshima Prefecture Location within Japan

Nakamyō Station (中名駅, Nakamyō-eki) is a passenger railway station located in the city of Ibusuki, Kagoshima Prefecture, Japan. It is operated by JR Kyushu.

== Lines ==
The station is served by the Ibusuki Makurazaki Line and is located 24.0 km from the starting point of the line at Kagoshima-Chūō.

== Layout ==
This is an above-ground station with one island platform and a level crossing. It is an unattended station.

=== Platforms ===
1	■ Ibusuki Makurazaki Line	for Kagoshima-Chūō
2	■ Ibusuki Makurazaki Line	for Ibusuki, Yamakawa and Makurazaki

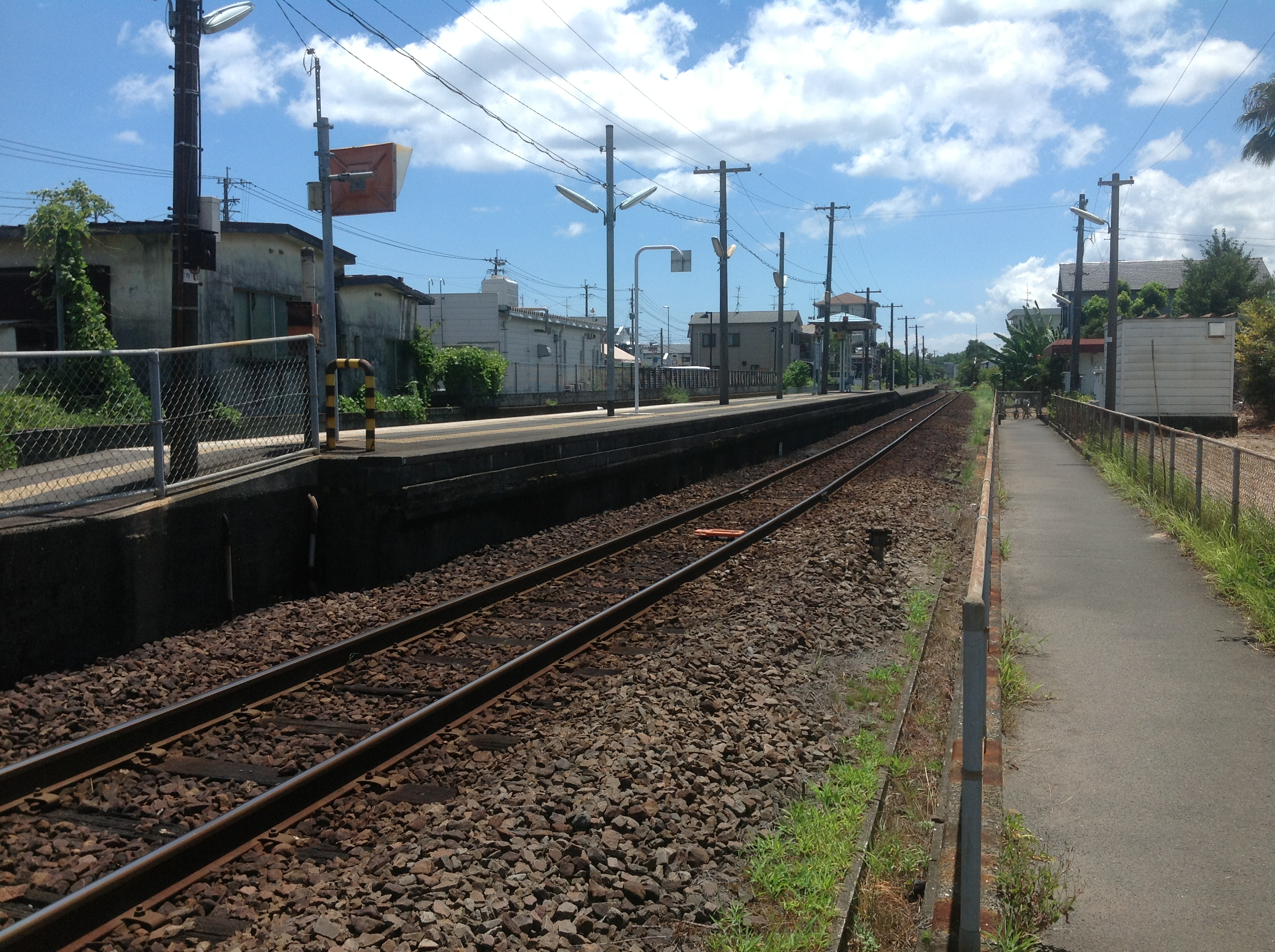
Platform

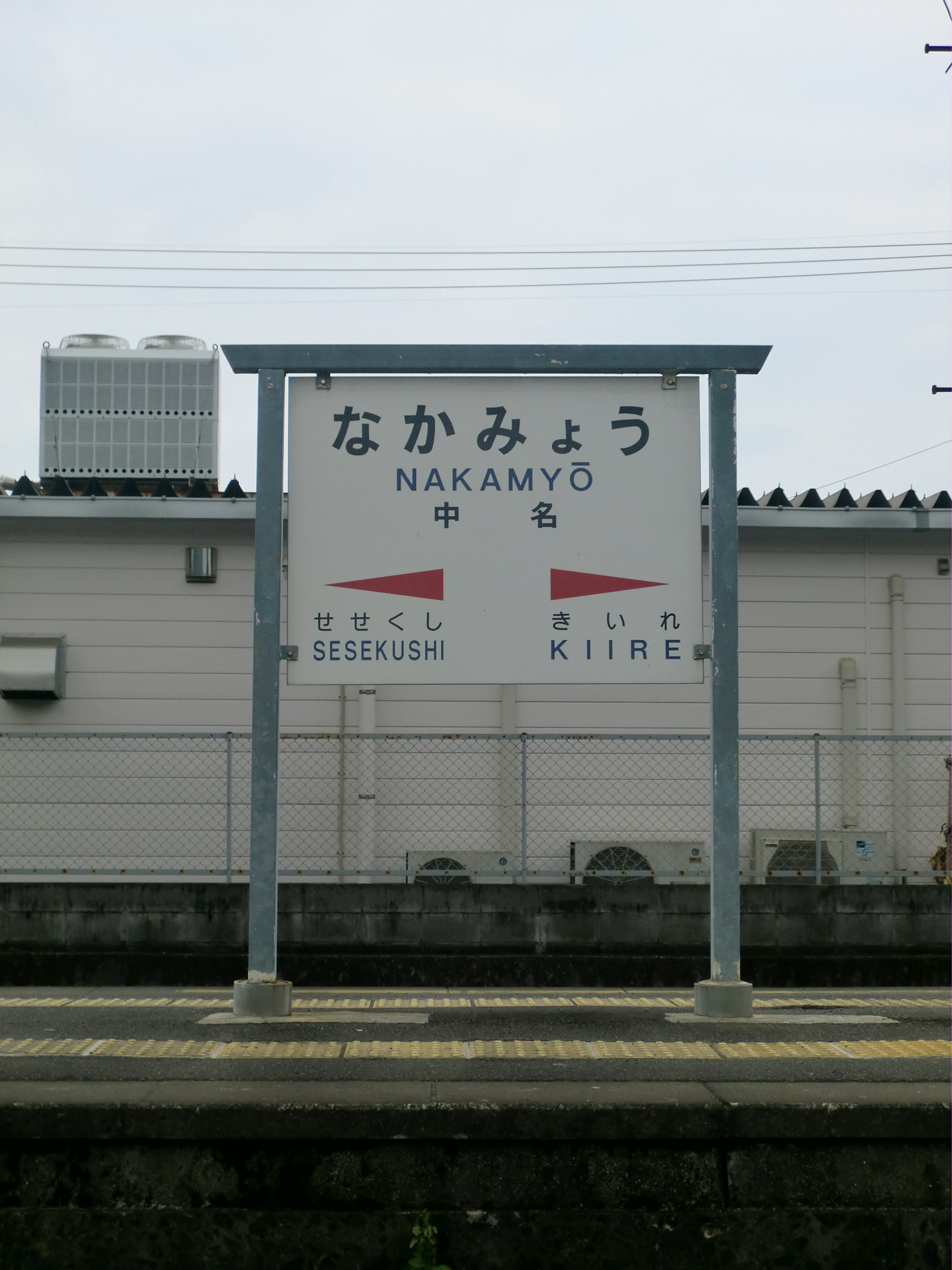
Station signage

== History ==
Japanese Government Railways (JGR) had opened the then Ibusuki Line (指宿線) from Nishi-Kagoshima (now Kagoshima-Chūō) to Goino on 7 December 1930. In the next phase of expansion, the track was extended south, with Nakamyō opening on 20 May 1934. On 31 October 1963, the line which served the station was renamed the Ibusuki Makurazaki Line. With the privatization of Japanese National Railways (JNR), the successor of JGR, on 1 April 1987, the station came under the control of JR Kyushu.

== Passenger statistics ==
In fiscal 2015, the station was used by an average of 165 passengers daily.

== Surrounding area ==
- Nippon Oil storage facilities
- Kagoshima City Nakamyō Elementary School
- Nakamyō Post office

== See also ==
- List of railway stations in Japan
