= Sakanoue Station =

Railway station in Kagoshima, Kagoshima Prefecture, Japan

Sakanoue Station 坂之上駅
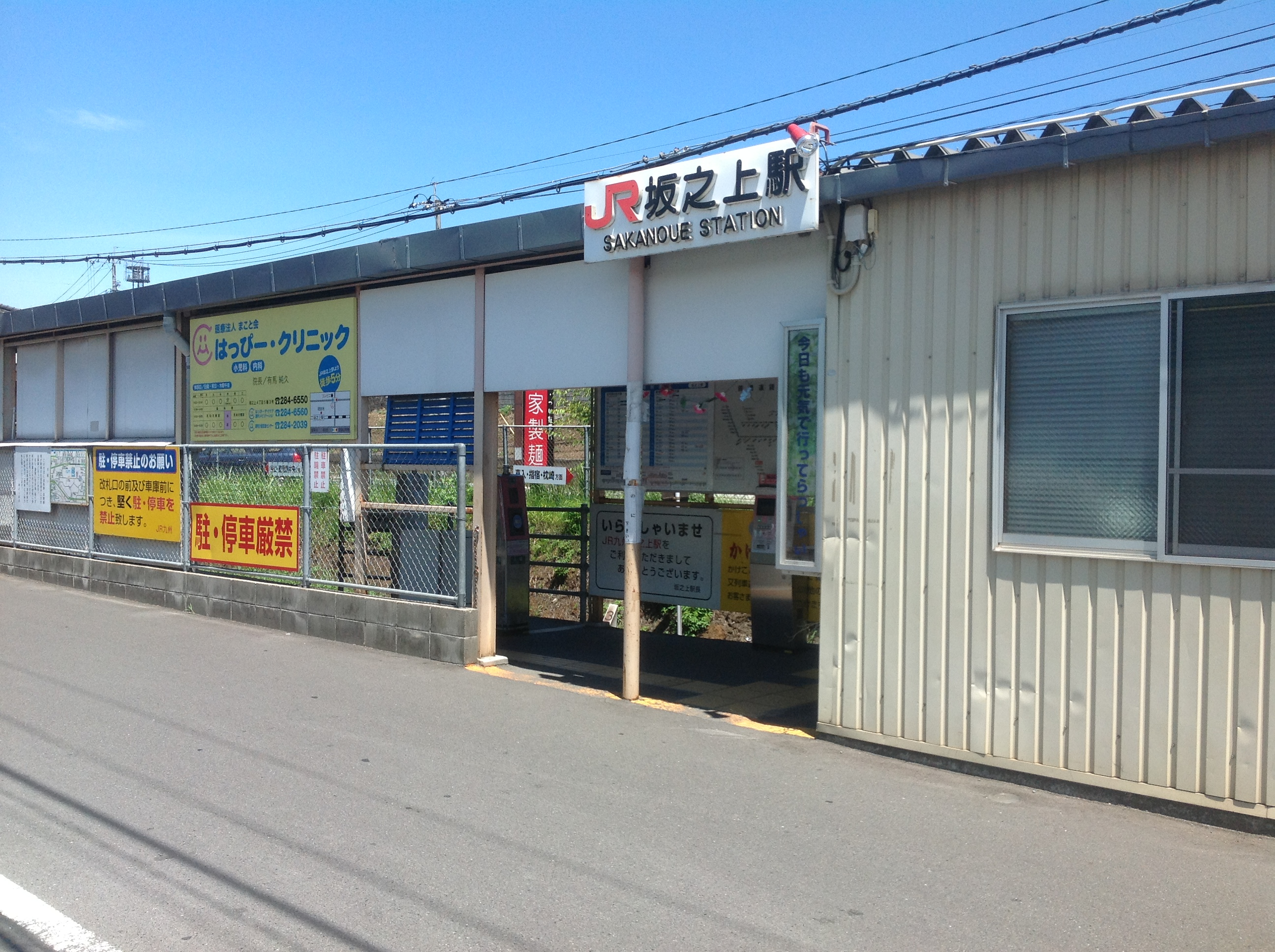
- Sakanoue Station in 2013

General information
- Location: Sakanoue 4-Chome, Kagoshima-shi, Kagoshima-ken 891-0150; Japan
- Coordinates: 31°30′1″N 130°30′28″E
- Operator: JR Kyushu
- Line: ■ Ibusuki Makurazaki Line
- Distance: 11.3 km from Kagoshima-Chūō
- Platforms: 1 side platform

Other information
- Status: Unstaffed
- Website: Official website

History
- Opened: 1 October 1966

Passengers
- FY2020: 1867 daily

Services
Preceding station	JR Kyushu	Following station
Jigenji towards Kagoshima-Chūō	Ibusuki Makurazaki Line	Goino towards Makurazaki
Location
- Location within Kagoshima Prefecture Location within Japan

Sakanoue Station (坂之上駅, Sakanoue-eki) is a passenger railway station located in the city of Kagoshima, Kagoshima Prefecture, Japan. It is operated by JR Kyushu.

== Lines ==
The station is served by the Ibusuki Makurazaki Line and is located11.3 km from the starting point of the line at Kagoshima-Chūō.

== Layout ==
This is an above-ground station with one side platform. The station is unattended.

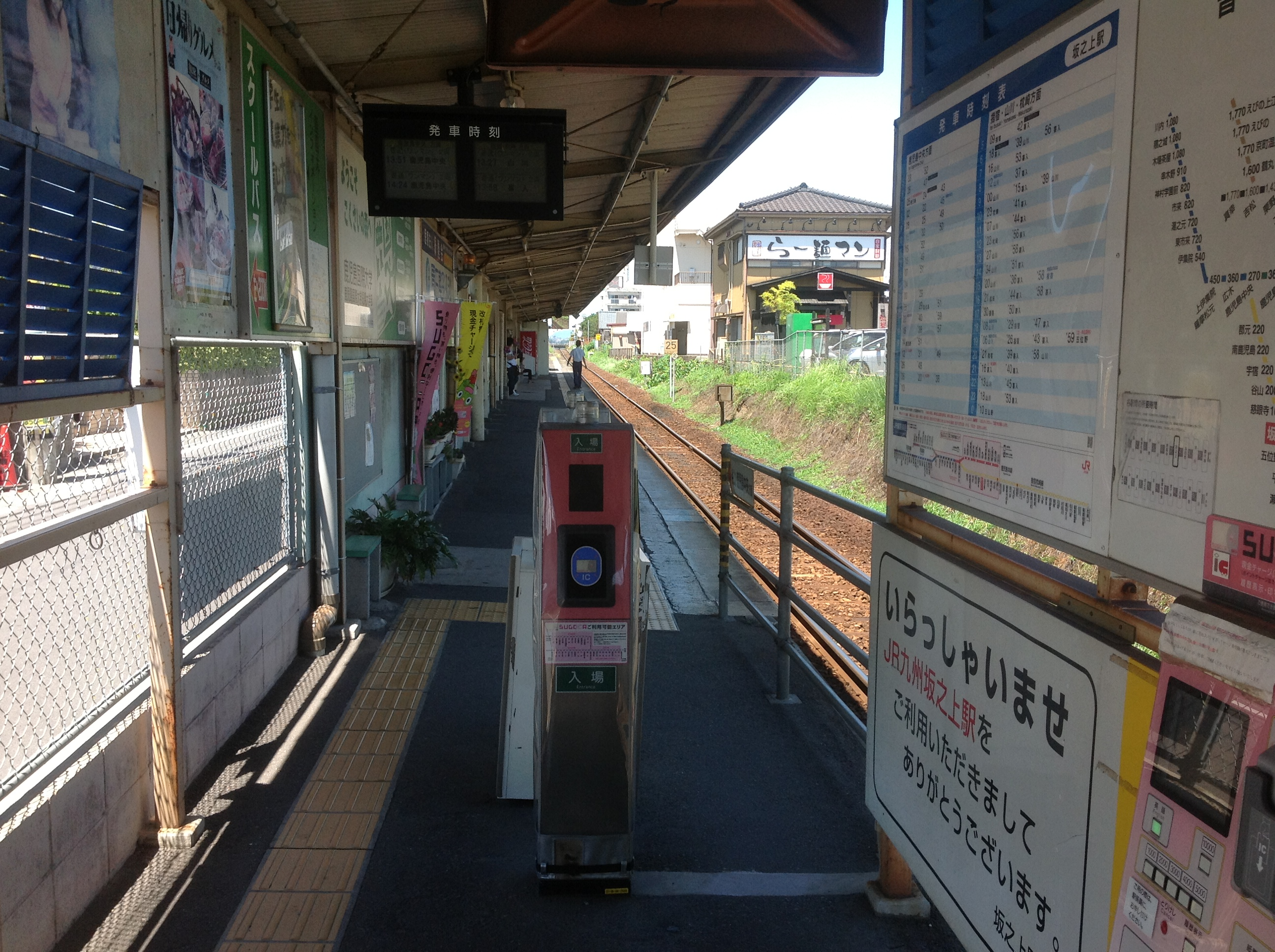
Exit Gate

== History ==
Japanese Government Railways (JGR) had opened the then Ibusuki Line (指宿線) from Nishi-Kagoshima (now Kagoshima-Chūō to Goino on 7 December 1930. In the next phase of expansion, the track was extended south, with Kiire opening as the new southern terminus on 20 May 1934. It became a through-station on 19 December 1934 when the track was further extended to Ibusuki. On 31 October 1963, the line which served the station was renamed the Ibusuki Makurazaki Line. With the privatization of Japanese National Railways (JNR), the successor of JGR, on 1 April 1987, the station came under the control of JR Kyushu.

== Passenger statistics ==
In fiscal 2020, the station was used by an average of 1867 passengers daily (boarding passengers only), and it ranked 78th among the busiest stations of JR Kyushu.

== Surrounding area ==
- Kagoshima International University and Graduate School
- Kagoshima City Wada Junior High School

== See also ==
- List of railway stations in Japan
