= Satsuma-Imaizumi Station =

Railway station in Ibusuki, Kagoshima Prefecture, Japan

Satsuma-Imaizumi Station 薩摩今和泉駅
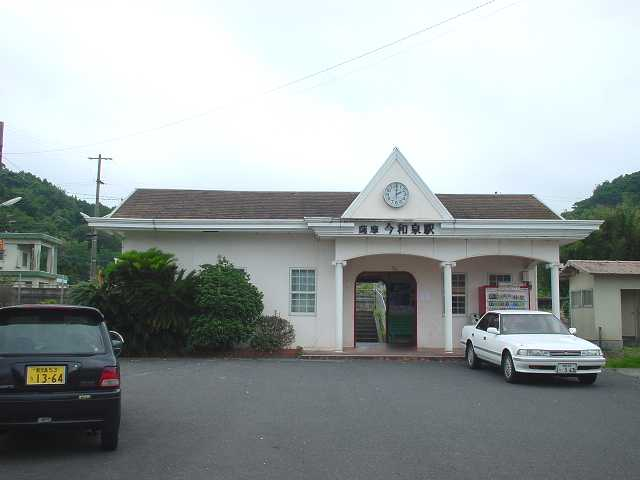
- Satsuma-Imaizumi Station in 2005

General information
- Location: 2972 Iwamoto, Ibusuki-shi, Kagoshima-ken 891-0315; Japan
- Coordinates: 31°17′27″N 130°35′55″E
- Operator: JR Kyushu
- Line: ■ Ibusuki Makurazaki Line
- Distance: 37.9 km from Kagoshima-Chūō
- Platforms: 1 island platform

Other information
- Status: Unstaffed
- Website: Official website

History
- Opened: 19 December 1934

Passengers
- FY2020: 414 daily

Services
Preceding station	JR Kyushu	Following station
Nukumi towards Kagoshima-Chūō	Ibusuki Makurazaki Line	Miyagahama towards Makurazaki
Location
- Location within Kagoshima Prefecture Location within Japan

Satsuma-Imaizumi Station (薩摩今和泉駅, Satsuma-Imaizumi-eki) is a passenger railway station located in the city of Ibusuki, Kagoshima Prefecture, Japan. It is operated by JR Kyushu.

== Lines ==
The station is served by the Ibusuki Makurazaki Line and is located 37.9 km from the starting point of the line at Kagoshima-Chūō.

== Layout ==
This is an above-ground station with one island platform connected to the station building by a footbridge. It is an unattended station.

=== Platforms ===
1	■ ■ Ibusuki Makurazaki Line	for Ibusuki and Makurazaki
2	■ ■ Ibusuki Makurazaki Line	for Kagoshima-Chūō

== History ==
The station was opened on 19 December 1934 by the Japanese Government Railways (JGR) . On 31 October 1961 with the name of the line is changed to the Ibusuki Makurazaki Line. With the privatization of Japanese National Railways (JNR), the successor of JGR, on 1 April 1987, JR Kyushu took over control of the station.

== Passenger statistics ==
In fiscal 2020, the station was used by an average of 414 passengers daily (boarding passengers only), and it ranked 237th among the busiest stations of JR Kyushu.

== Surrounding area ==
- Ibusuki Municipal Ibusuki Commercial High School
- Ibusuki City Hall Imaizumi Branch

== See also ==
- List of railway stations in Japan
