= Jigenji Station =

Railway station in Kagoshima, Kagoshima Prefecture, Japan

Jigenji Station 慈眼寺駅
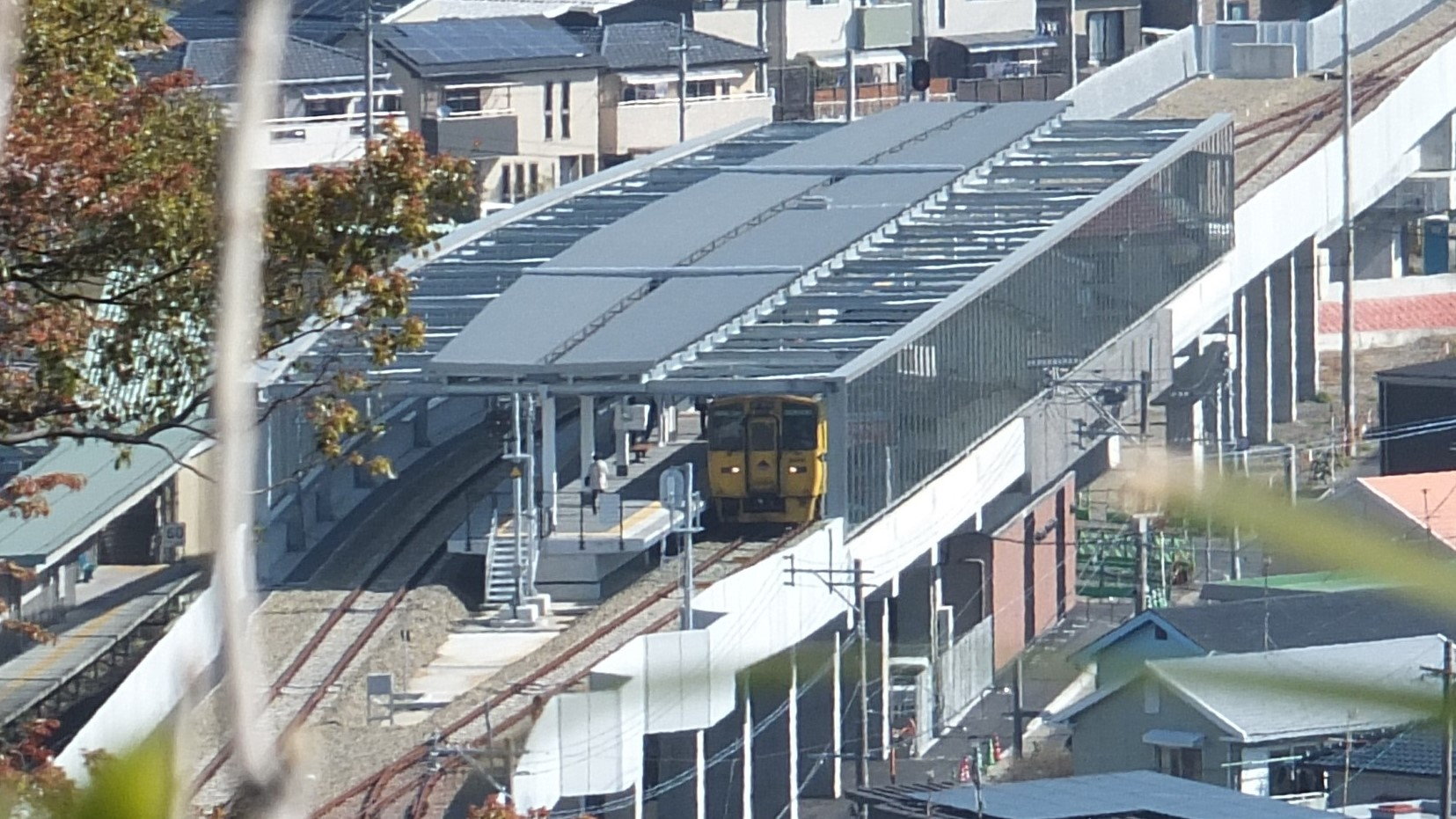
- JR Jigeiji Station Station Building

General information
- Location: Jigenji-chō 1-Chōme, Kagoshima-shi, Kagoshima-ken 891-0146; Japan
- Coordinates: 31°31′2″N 130°30′22″E
- Operator: JR Kyushu
- Line: ■ Ibusuki Makurazaki Line
- Distance: 9.2 km from Kagoshima-Chūō
- Platforms: 1 island platform

Other information
- Status: Staffed
- Website: Official website

History
- Opened: 13 March 1988

Passengers
- FY2020: 1279 daily

Services
Preceding station	JR Kyushu	Following station
Taniyama towards Kagoshima-Chūō	Ibusuki Makurazaki Line	Sakanoue towards Makurazaki
Location
- Location within Kagoshima Prefecture Location within Japan

Jigenji Station (慈眼寺駅, Jigenji-eki) is a passenger railway station located in the city of Kagoshima, Kagoshima Prefecture, Japan. It is operated by JR Kyushu.

== Lines ==
The station is served by the Ibusuki Makurazaki Line and is located 9.2 km from the starting point of the line at Kagoshima-Chūō.

== Layout ==
The station consists of one elevated island platform with the station facilities underneath. The station is staffed.

=== Platforms ===
1	■ Ibusuki Makurazaki Line	for Ibusuki and Makurazaki
2	■ Ibusuki Makurazaki Line	for Kagoshima-Chūō

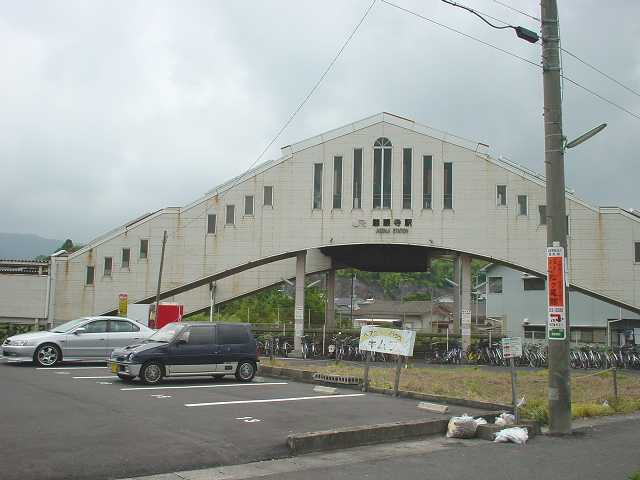
Pedestrian bridge

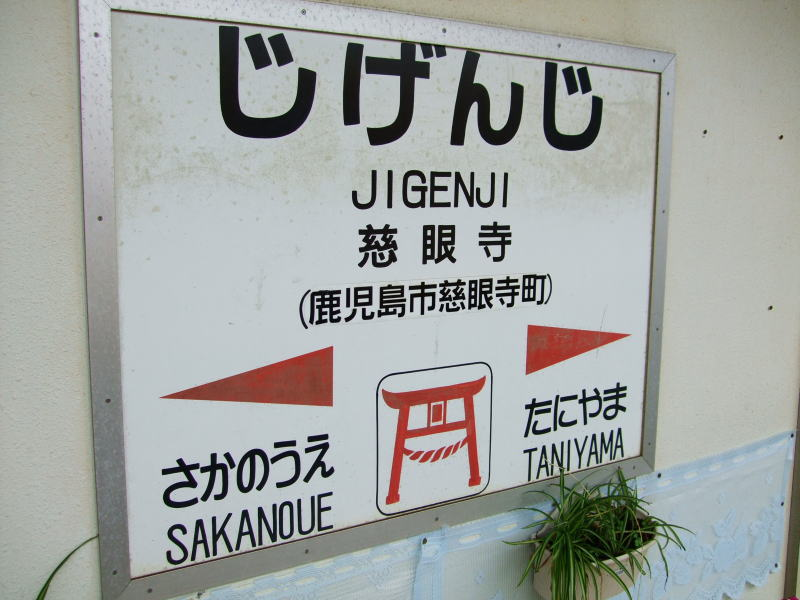
Signage

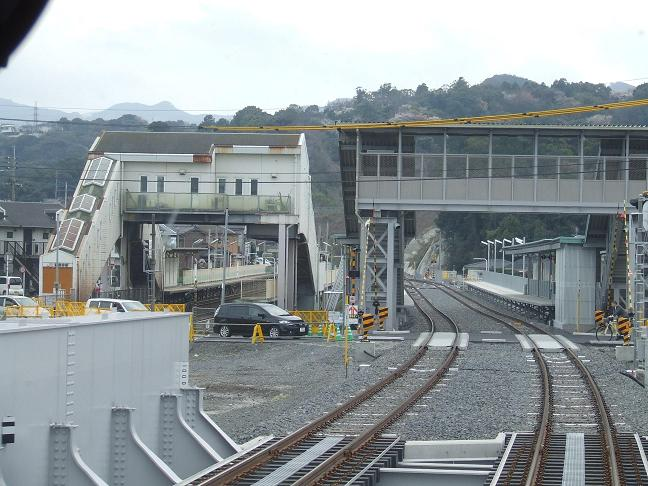
View from the tracks

== History ==
The station was opened on 13 March 1988 on the former site of the prefectural agricultural experiment station, which is bing redeveloped into a housing area.

== Passenger statistics ==
In fiscal 2020, the station was used by an average of 1279 passengers daily (boarding passengers only), and it ranked 115th among the busiest stations of JR Kyushu.

== Surrounding area ==
- Jigenji Park: Designated as a "scenic area."
- Taniyama Gokoku Shrine
- Kagoshima City Wada Elementary Schoo

== See also ==
- List of railway stations in Japan
