= Hirakawa Station =

Railway station in Kagoshima, Kagoshima Prefecture, Japan

Hirakawa Station 平川駅
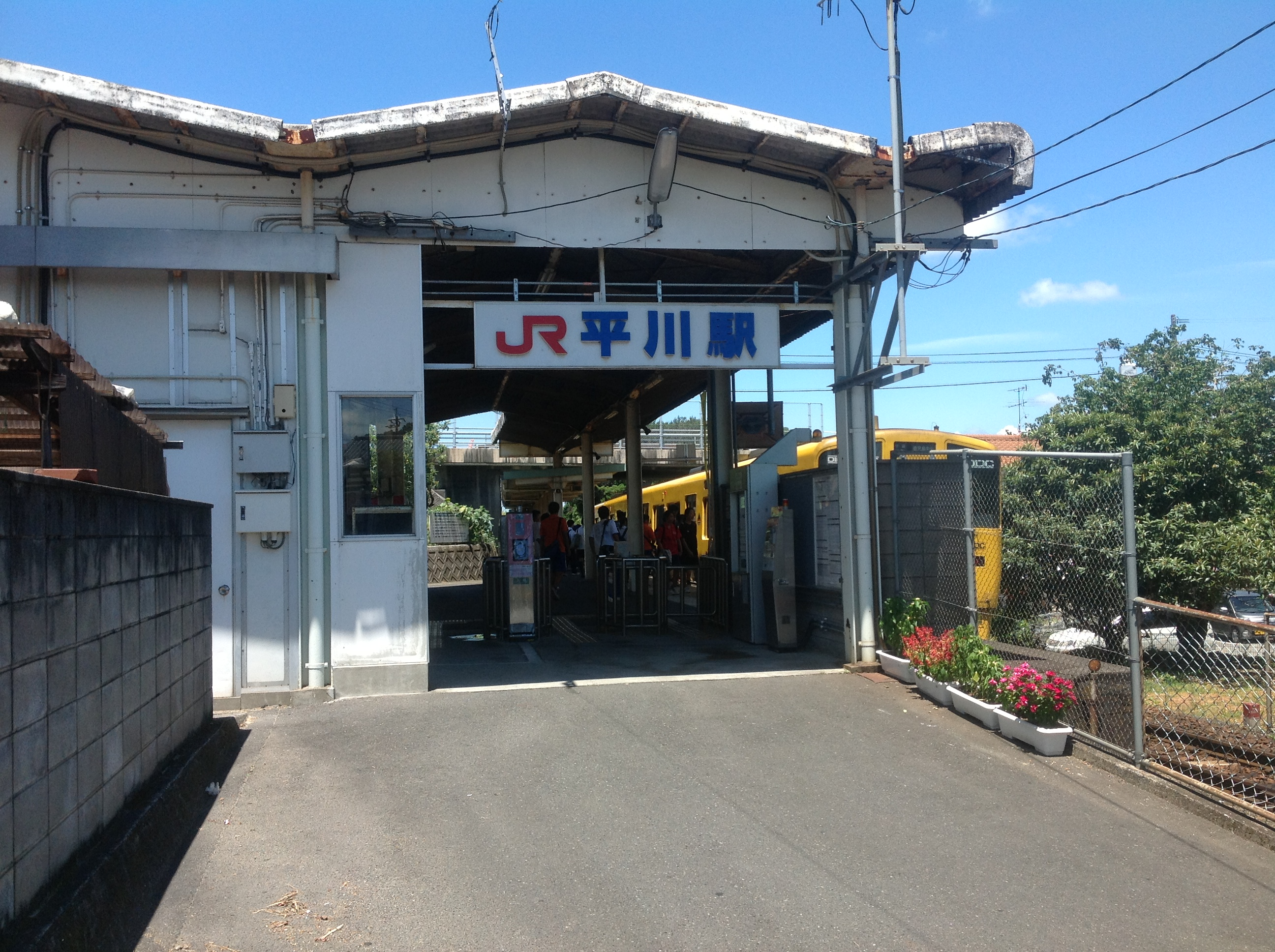
- Hirakawa Station

General information
- Location: 3786 Hirakawa-chō, Kagoshima-shi, Kagoshima-ken 891-0133; Japan
- Coordinates: 31°27′0″N 130°30′49″E
- Operator: JR Kyushu
- Line: ■ Ibusuki Makurazaki Line
- Distance: 17.2 km from Kagoshima-Chūō
- Platforms: 1 side platform

Other information
- Status: Unstaffed
- Website: Official website

History
- Opened: 20 May 1934

Passengers
- FY2020: 896 daily

Services
Preceding station	JR Kyushu	Following station
Goino towards Kagoshima-Chūō	Ibusuki Makurazaki Line	Sesekushi towards Makurazaki
Location
- Location within Kagoshima Prefecture Location within Japan

Hirakawa Station (平川駅, Hirakawa-eki) is a passenger railway station located in the city of Kagoshima, Kagoshima Prefecture, Japan. It is operated by JR Kyushu.

== Lines ==
The station is served by the Ibusuki Makurazaki Line and is located 17.2 km from the starting point of the line at Kagoshima-Chūō.

== Layout ==
This is an above-ground station with one side platform. The station is unattended.

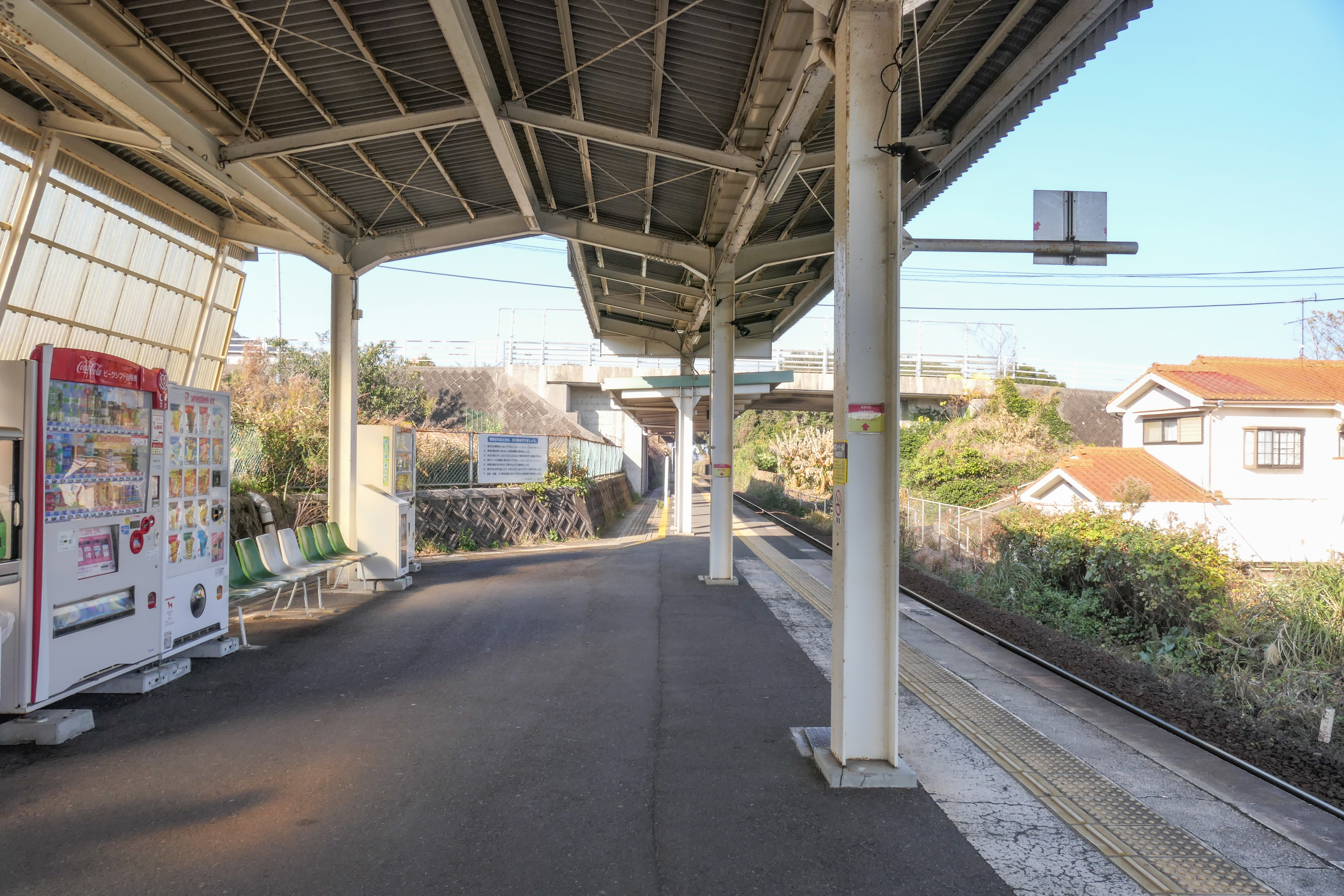
Platform

== History ==
Japanese Government Railways (JGR) had opened the then Ibusuki Line (指宿線) from Nishi-Kagoshima (now Kagoshima-Chūō to Goino on 7 December 1930. In the next phase of expansion, the track was extended south, with Hirakawa opening on 20 May 1934. On 31 October 1963, the line which served the station was renamed the Ibusuki Makurazaki Line. With the privatization of Japanese National Railways (JNR), the successor of JGR, on 1 April 1987, the station came under the control of JR Kyushu.

== Passenger statistics ==
In fiscal 2020, the station was used by an average of 896 passengers daily (boarding passengers only), and it ranked 148th among the busiest stations of JR Kyushu.

== Surrounding area ==
- Japan National Route 226
- Kagoshima Prefectural Kinkowan High School
- Kagoshima Medical Technology College Hirakawa Campus

== See also ==
- List of railway stations in Japan
