= Ibusuki Makurazaki Line =

Railway line in Kagoshima Prefecture, Japan

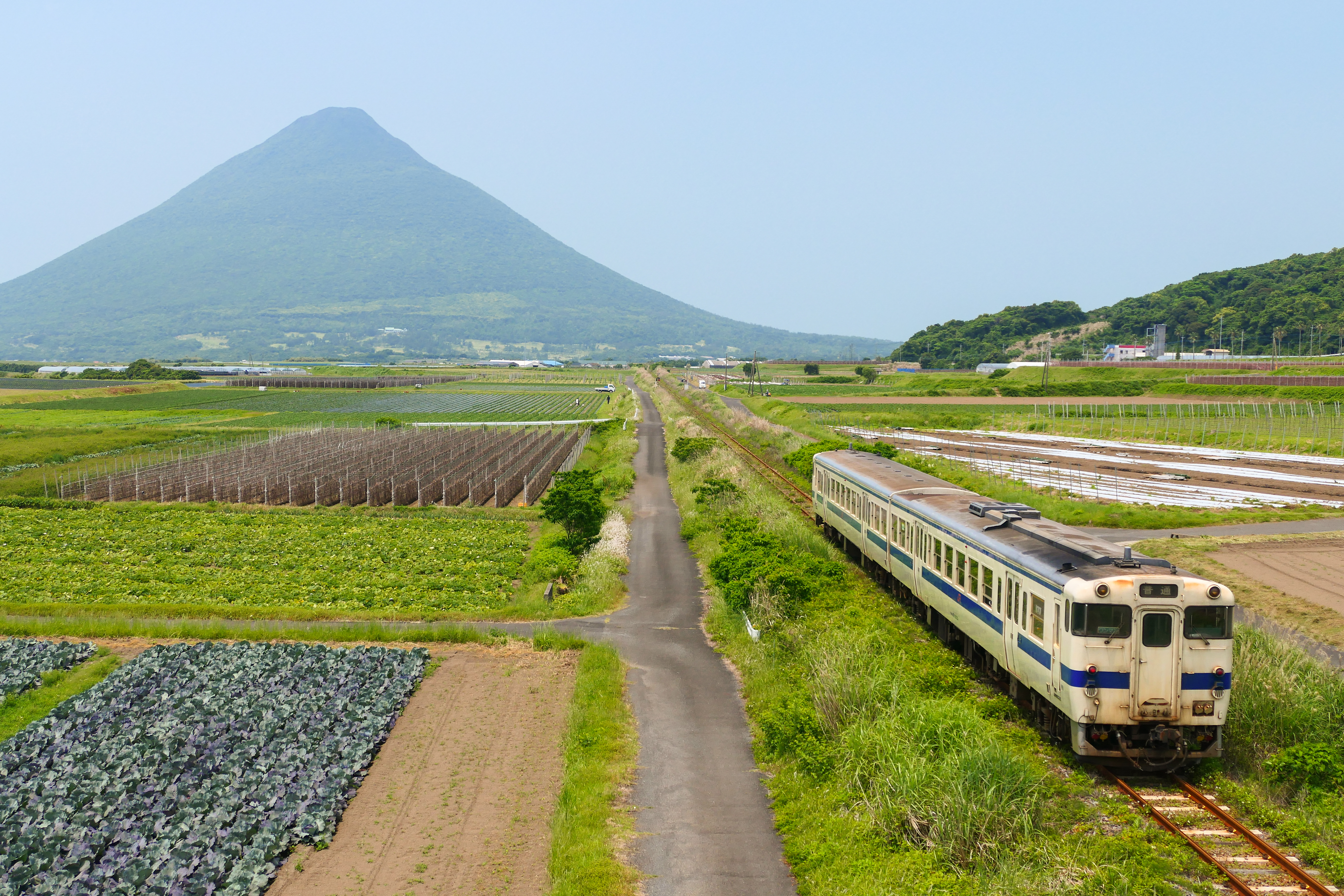
- KiHa 47 train with Mount Kaimon in the background, May 2023

Overview
- Native name: 指宿枕崎線
- Status: In operation
- Owner: JR Kyushu
- Locale: Kagoshima Prefecture
- Termini: Kagoshima-Chūō; Makurazaki
- Stations: 36

Service
- Operator: JR Kyushu
- Rolling stock: KiHa 40 series DMU, KiHa 200 series DMU

History
- Opened: December 7, 1930

Technical
- Line length: 87.8 km (54.6 mi)
- Num of tracks: Entire line single tracked
- Character: Rural and quiet
- Track gauge: 1,067 mm (3 ft 6 in)
- Electrification: None
- Operating speed: 85 km/h (53 mph) (Kagoshima-Chūō–Yamakawa); 65 km/h (40 mph) (Yamakawa–Makurazaki)
Route map
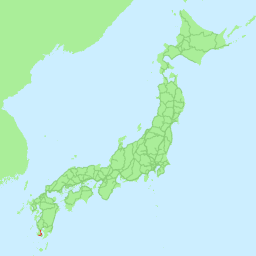

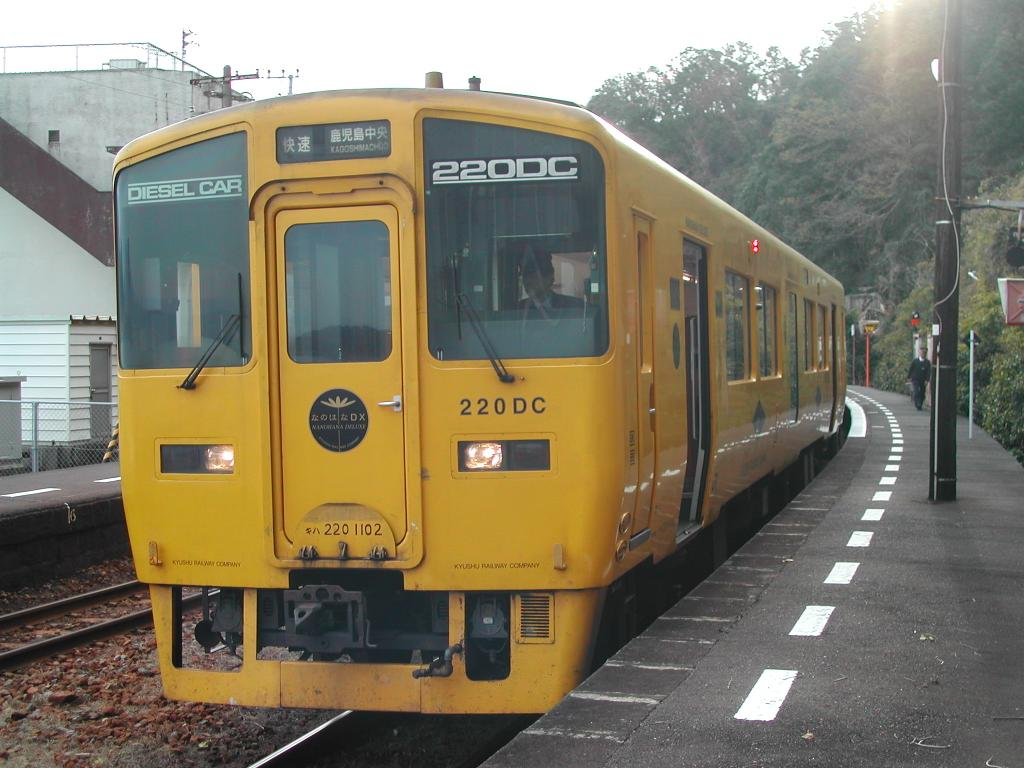
A Nanohana rapid service

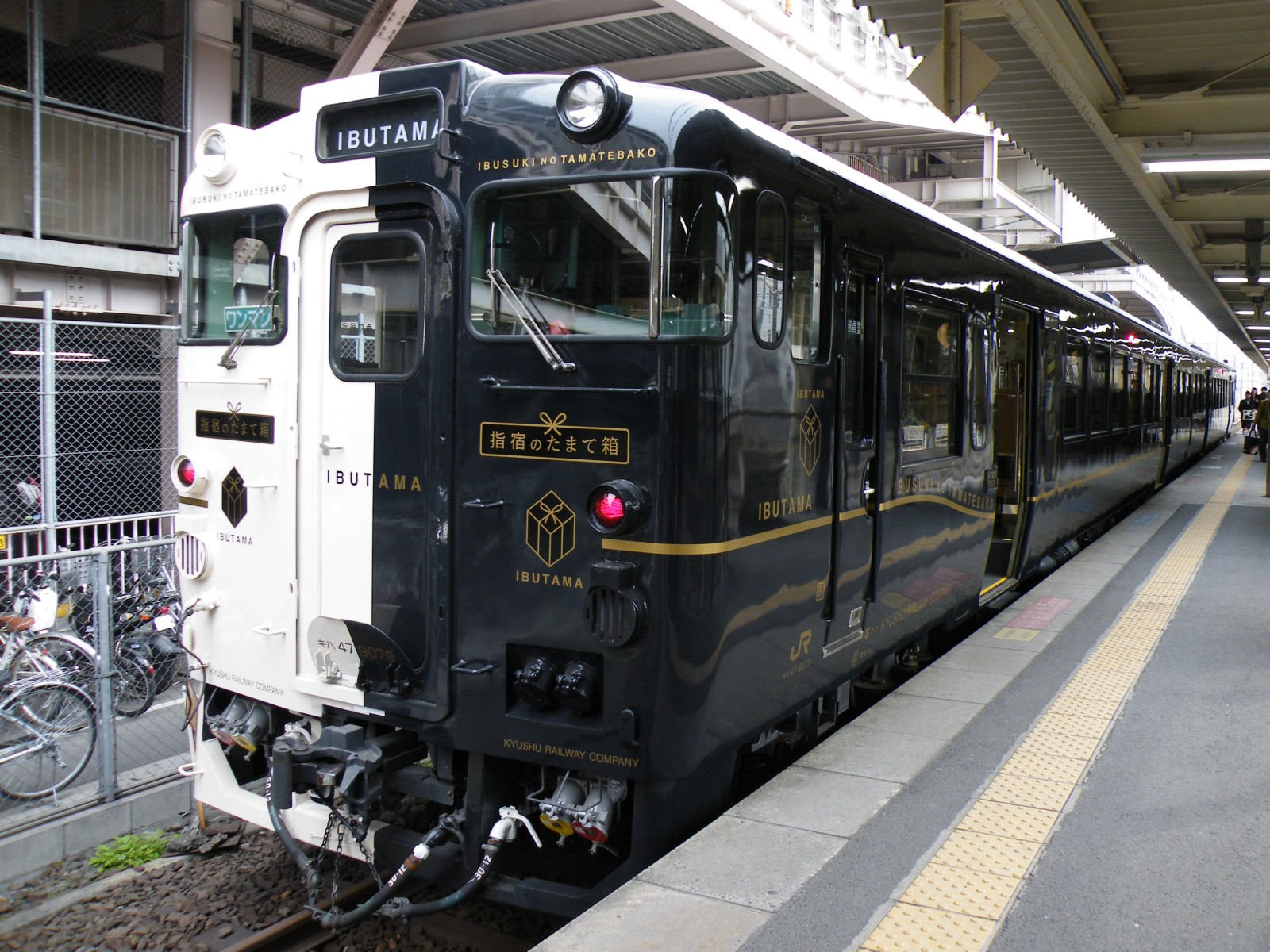
A Ibusuki no Tamatebako limited express

The Ibusuki Makurazaki Line (指宿枕崎線, Ibusuki Makurazaki-sen) is a railway line in Kagoshima Prefecture, Japan, operated by the Kyushu Railway Company (JR Kyushu). It connects Kagoshima-Chūō Station in Kagoshima, to Makurazaki Station in Makurazaki, paralleling the eastern and southern coasts of Satsuma Peninsula. Excluding the Okinawa Urban Monorail in Okinawa, this is the southernmost JR railway line in Japan, with Nishi-Ōyama Station being the southernmost station overall.

== Services ==
Most local and rapid services are driver-only operated; only some trains in the morning are staffed by a conductor. There are also trains that continue onwards to Kagoshima Station on the Kagoshima Main Line; once in the morning and twice in the evening.

The line is operationally divided into two sections. The section between Kagoshima-Chūō and Yamakawa functions as one of Kagoshima's commuter rail lines. As such, there are relatively many local trains. From Kagoshima-Chūō, there is roughly one train per 20 minutes to Goino, one every 20 to 40 minutes to Kiire, and one per one hour to Ibusuki or Yamakawa. After the timetable change in March 2017, the shortest interval between trains on the line is 6 minutes, at Kiire Station.

The Ibusuki no Tamatebako limited express and Nanohana (なのはな) rapid services operate on this section. The limited express train runs three times a day, and the rapid train runs three times a day southbound, four times a day northbound.

The section between Yamakawa and Makurazaki is an extremely quiet local line. During the daytime, there is no train service for six hours. In this section, all but Nishi-Ei are unstaffed stations, including Makurazaki, the terminus.

The Nanohana DX (なのはなDX) rapid service was discontinued from the start of the revised timetable on March 12, 2011.

== Stations ==
The Ibusuki Makurazaki Line is entirely in Kagoshima Prefecture.

Note': All trains stop at stations marked "+". Some trains stop at "*". No trains stop at "-".

Station		Nanohana:^{1}	Transfers	Location
Kagoshima-Chūō	鹿児島中央	+	Kyushu Shinkansen ■ Kagoshima Main Line ■ Nippō Main Line ■ Kagoshima City Tram Route 2	Kagoshima
Kōrimoto	郡元	+		Kagoshima
Minami-Kagoshima	南鹿児島	+	■ Kagoshima City Tram Route 1	Kagoshima
Usuki	宇宿	+	■ Kagoshima City Tram Route 1	Kagoshima
Taniyama	谷山	+		Kagoshima
Jigenji	慈眼寺	+		Kagoshima
Sakanoue	坂之上	+		Kagoshima
Goino	五位野	*		Kagoshima
Hirakawa	平川	*		Kagoshima
Sesekushi	瀬々串	*		Kagoshima
Nakamyō	中名	-		Kagoshima
Kiire	喜入	+		Kagoshima
Maenohama	前之浜	-		Kagoshima
Nukumi	生見	-		Kagoshima
Satsuma-Imaizumi	薩摩今和泉	*		Ibusuki
Miyagahama	宮ヶ浜	*		Ibusuki
Nigatsuden	二月田	*		Ibusuki
Ibusuki	指宿	+		Ibusuki
Yamakawa	山川	+		Ibusuki
Ōyama	大山			Ibusuki
Nishi-Ōyama	西大山			Ibusuki
Satsuma-Kawashiri	薩摩川尻			Ibusuki
Higashi-Kaimon	東開聞			Ibusuki
Kaimon	開聞			Ibusuki
Irino	入野			Ibusuki
Ei	頴娃			Minamikyūshū
Nishi-Ei	西頴娃			Minamikyūshū
Goryō	御領			Minamikyūshū
Ishikaki	石垣			Minamikyūshū
Mizunarikawa	水成川			Minamikyūshū
Ei-Ōkawa	頴娃大川			Minamikyūshū
Matsugaura	松ヶ浦			Minamikyūshū
Satsuma-Shioya	薩摩塩屋			Minamikyūshū
Shirasawa	白沢			Makurazaki
Satsuma-Itashiki	薩摩板敷			Makurazaki
Makurazaki	枕崎			Makurazaki

== History ==
The 14 km (8.7 mi) Nishi-Kagoshima (now Kagoshima-Chūō) to Goino section opened in 1930, and was extended 32 km (20 mi) to Ibusuki in 1934, and a further 4 km (2.5 mi) to Yamakawa in 1936. The next 18 km (11 mi) extension to Nishi-Ei opened in 1960 as a passenger only line, and Makurazaki (a further 20 km or 12 mi) was reached in 1963.

Steam locomotives were withdrawn in 1973, and freight services in 1980. CTC signalling was commissioned between Nishi-Kagoshima and Yamakawa in 1983. Token signalling between Yamakawa and Makurazaki was abolished in 1994.

On June 21, 2014, a ten-metre cliff between Satsuma-Imaizumi and Nukumi collapsed. A Kagoshima-bound limited express train rode onto the debris caused by the collapse, resulting in the derailment of the first car. Out of 47 people on board, 13 passengers and two staff were injured; three were hospitalised. The section between Kiire and Ibusuki was then closed until June 28.

In July 2014, JR Kyushu raised the possibility of partially closing the Ibusuki Makurazaki Line due to consistent financial loss.

== See also ==
- List of railway lines in Japan
