= Goino Station =

Railway station in Kagoshima, Kagoshima Prefecture, Japan

Goino Station 五位野駅
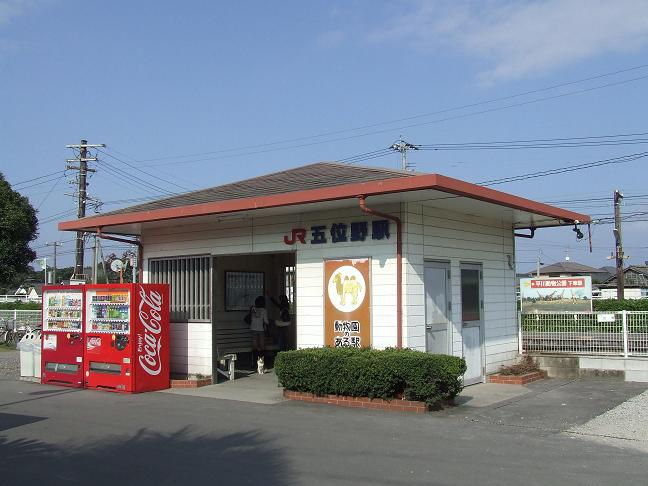
- Goino Station in 2009

General information
- Location: 895 Hirakawa-chō, Kagoshima-shi, Kagoshima-ken 891-0133; Japan
- Coordinates: 31°28′32″N 130°30′14″E
- Operator: JR Kyushu
- Line: ■ Ibusuki Makurazaki Line
- Distance: 14.1 km from Kagoshima-Chūō
- Platforms: 2 side platforms

Other information
- Status: Unstaffed
- Website: Official website

History
- Opened: 7 December 1930

Passengers
- FY2020: 312 daily

Services
| Preceding station | JR Kyushu | Following station |
|---|---|---|
| Sakanoue towards Kagoshima-Chūō | Ibusuki Makurazaki Line | Hirakawa towards Makurazaki |
Location
- Location within Kagoshima Prefecture Location within Japan

Goino Station (五位野駅, Goino-eki) is a passenger railway station located in the city of Kagoshima, Kagoshima Prefecture, Japan. It is operated by JR Kyushu.

== Lines ==
The station is served by the Ibusuki Makurazaki Line and is located 14.1 km from the starting point of the line at Kagoshima-Chūō.

== Layout ==
This is an above-ground station with two opposed side platforms, connected by a footbridge. The station is unattended.

=== Platforms ===
| 1 | ■ Ibusuki Makurazaki Line | for Kagoshima-Chūō |
| 2 | ■ Ibusuki Makurazaki Line | for Ibusuki and Makurazaki |

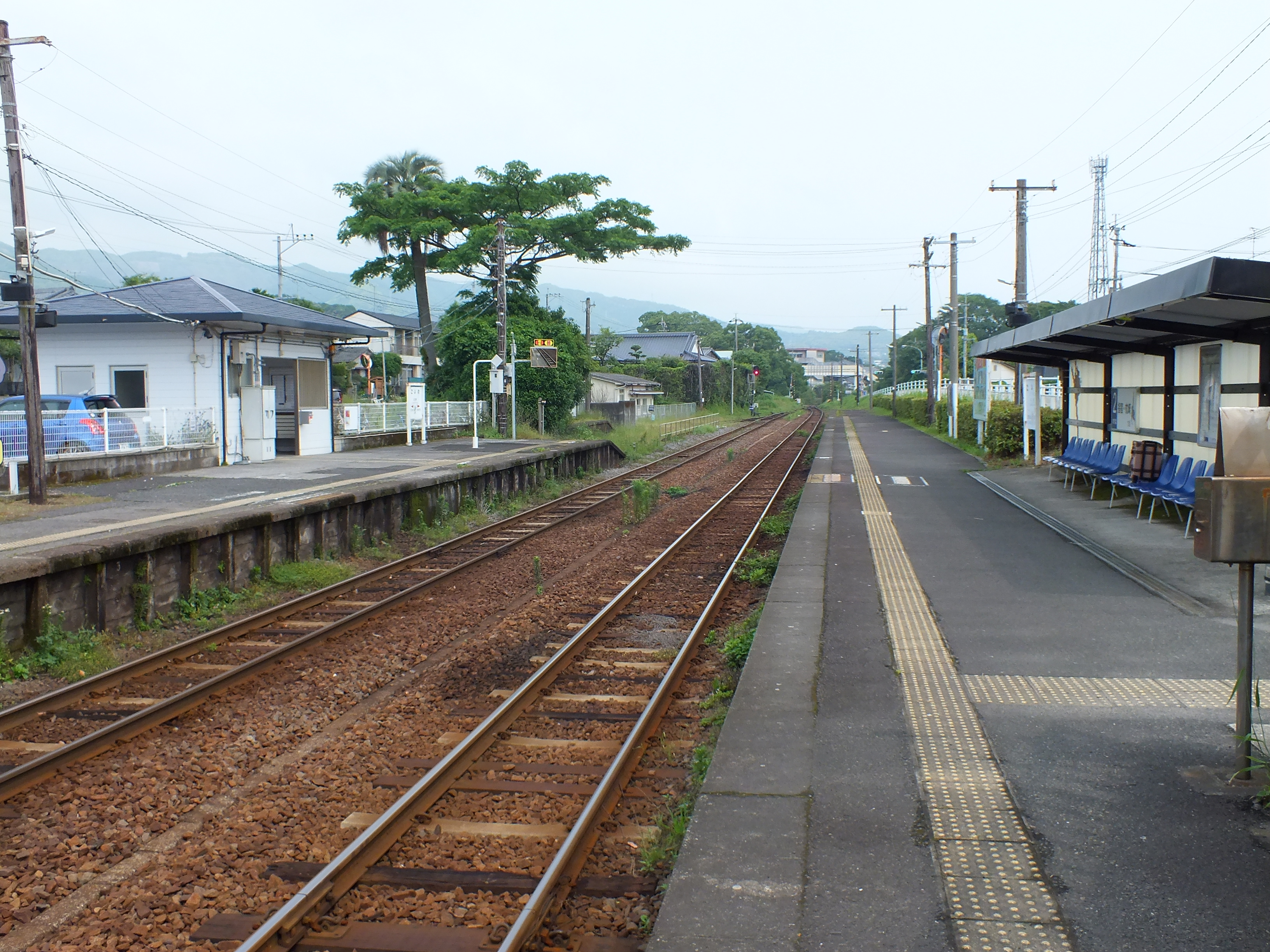
Platform

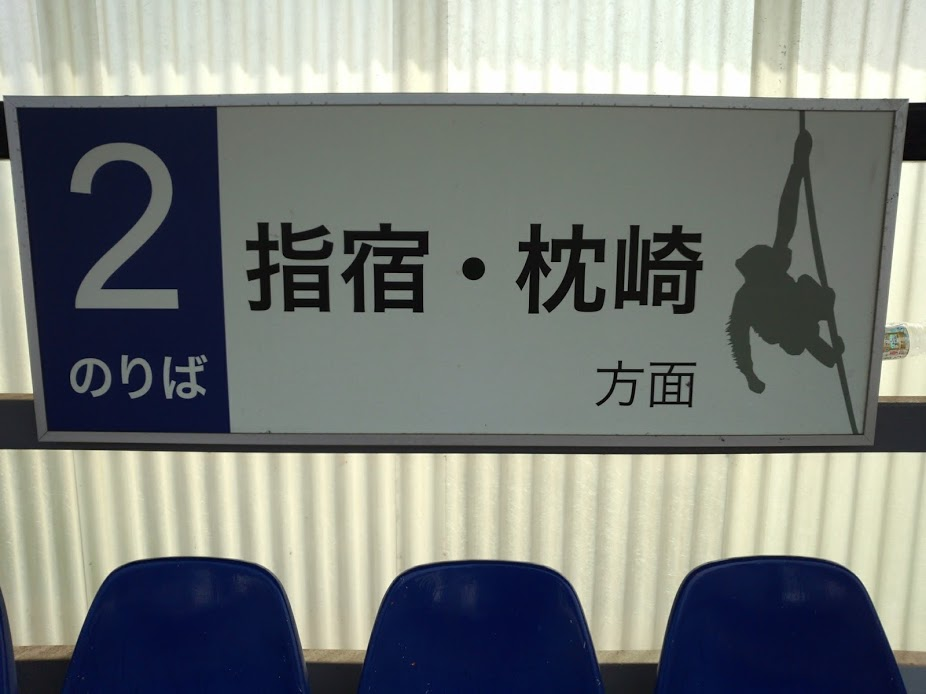
Previous signage

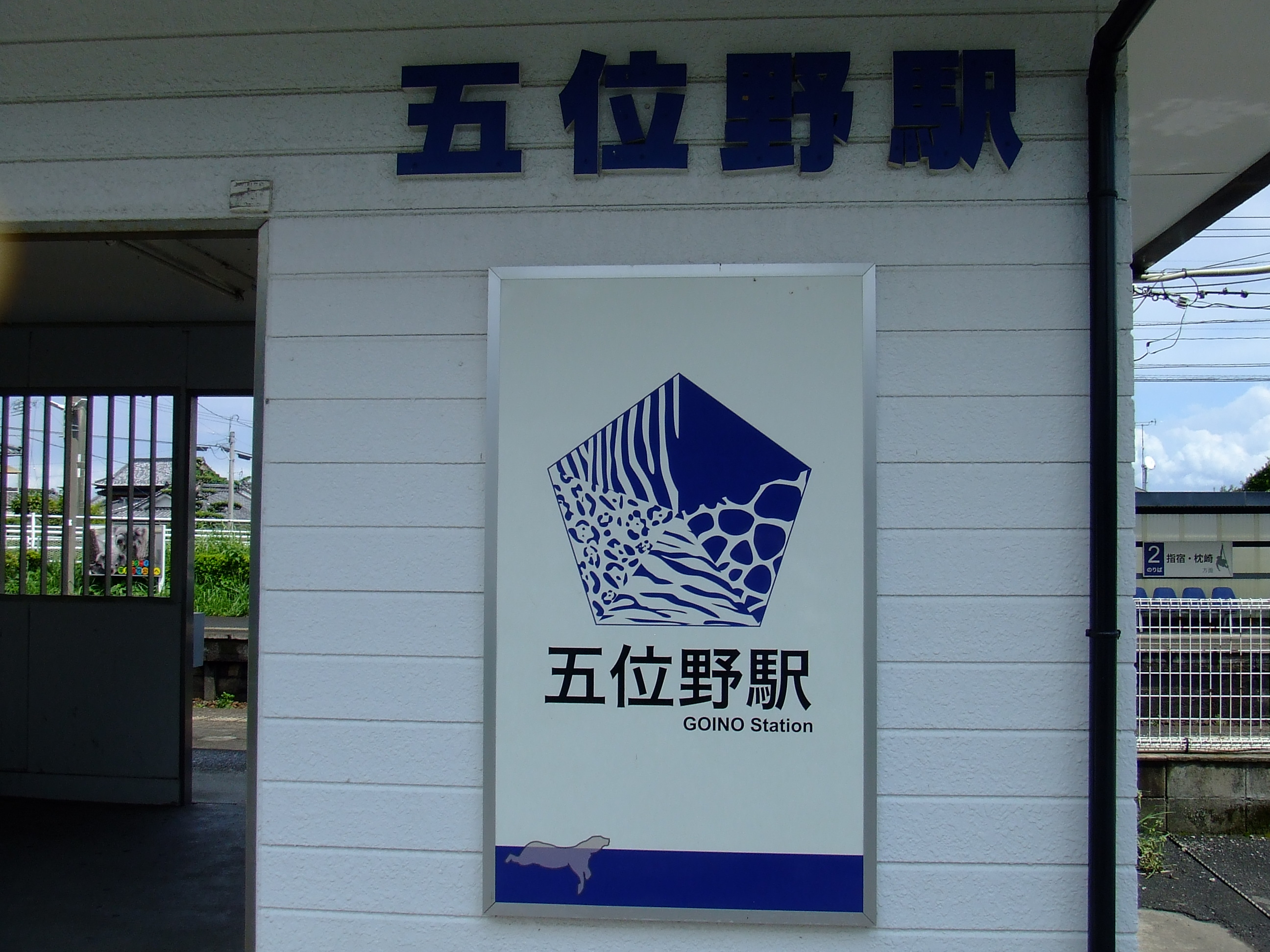
Signage from 2017

== History ==
The station was opened on 7 December 1930 by Japanese Government Railways (JGR) as the southern terminus of the then Ibusuki Line (指宿線) which it had laid from Nishi-Kagoshima (now Kagoshima-Chūō). It became a through-station on 20 May 1934 when the track was extended south to Kiire. On 31 October 1963, the line which served the station was renamed the Ibusuki Makurazaki Line. With the privatization of Japanese National Railways (JNR), the successor of JGR, on 1 April 1987, the station came under the control of JR Kyushu.

== Passenger statistics ==
In fiscal 2020, the station was used by an average of 312 passengers daily (boarding passengers only), and it ranked 272nd among the busiest stations of JR Kyushu.

== Surrounding area ==
- Kagoshima City Hirakawa Zoo: Approximately 20 minutes on foot
- Kinkowan Park: Approximately 20 minutes on foot

== See also ==
- List of railway stations in Japan
