= Ibusuki Station =

Railway station in Ibusuki, Kagoshima Prefecture, Japan

Ibusuki Station 指宿駅
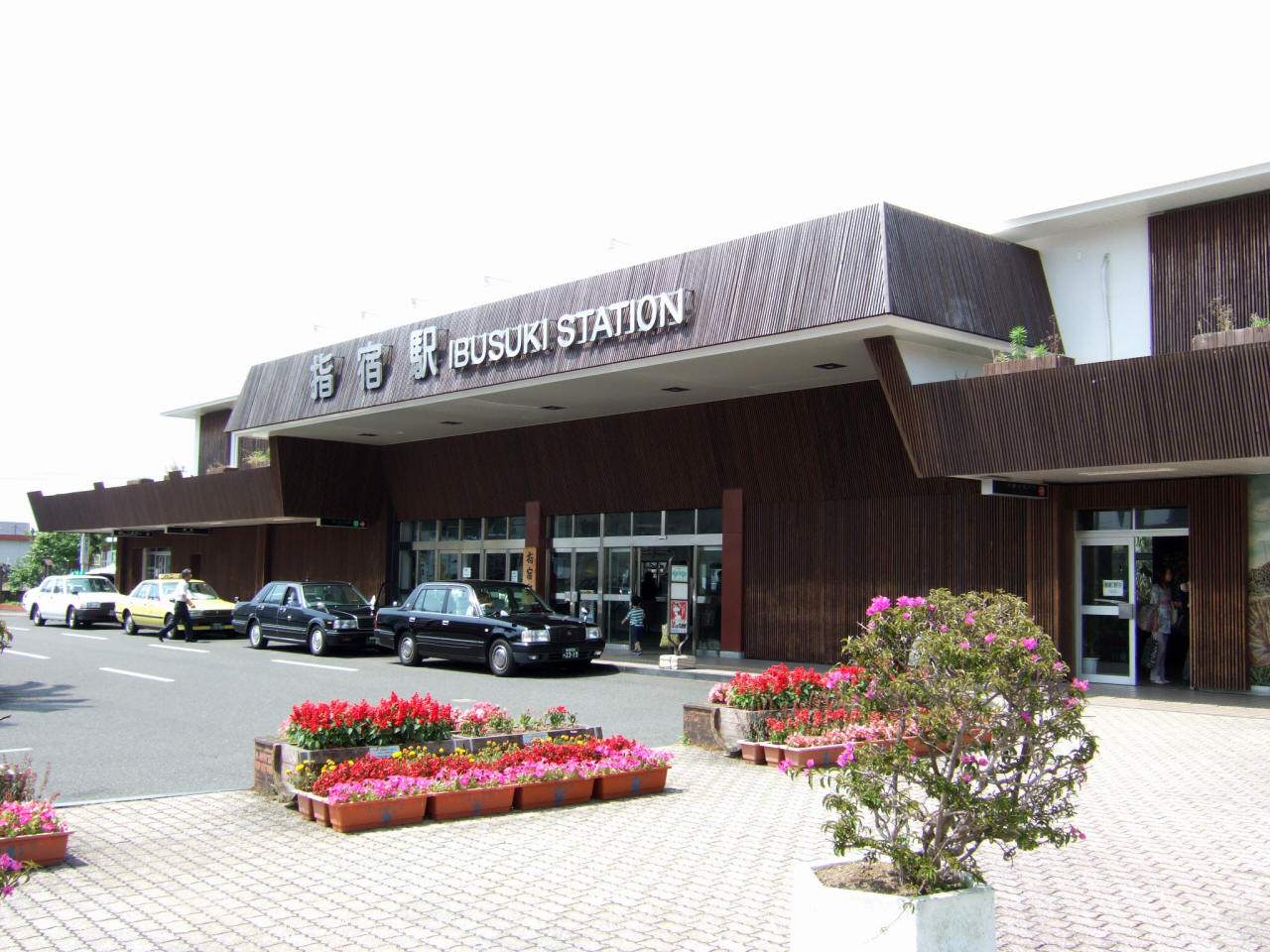
- Ibusuki Station

General information
- Location: 1 Yunohama, Ibusuki-shi, Kagoshima-ken 891-0403; Japan
- Coordinates: 31°14′14″N 130°38′34″E
- Operator: JR Kyushu
- Line: ■ Ibusuki Makurazaki Line
- Distance: 45.7 km from Kagoshima-Chūō
- Platforms: 1 side + 1 island platform

Other information
- Status: Staffed (Midori no Madoguchi)
- Website: Official website

History
- Opened: 19 December 1934

Passengers
- FY2020: 391 daily

Services
Preceding station	JR Kyushu	Following station
Nigatsuden towards Kagoshima-Chūō	Ibusuki Makurazaki Line	Yamakawa towards Makurazaki
Location
- Location within Kagoshima Prefecture Location within Japan

Ibusuki Station (指宿駅, Ibusuki-eki)is a passenger railway station located in the city of Ibusuki, Kagoshima Prefecture, Japan. It is operated by JR Kyushu.

== Lines ==
The station is served by the Ibusuki Makurazaki Line and is located 45.7 km from the starting point of the line at Kagoshima-Chūō.

== Layout ==
The station consists of one side platform and one island platform, allowing trains to switch and turn around. The platforms are connected by a footbridge. There are several sidings on the west side of the station. Platform 1 is mainly used, and other platforms are used when platform 1 is not available for switching. The station has a Midori no Madoguchi staffed ticket office.

=== Platforms ===
1	■ Ibusuki Makurazaki Line	for Kiire and Kagoshima-Chūō for Yamakawa and Makurazaki
2	■ Ibusuki Makurazaki Line	for Yamakawa and Makurazaki
3	■ Ibusuki Makurazaki Line	for Kiire and Kagoshima-Chūō

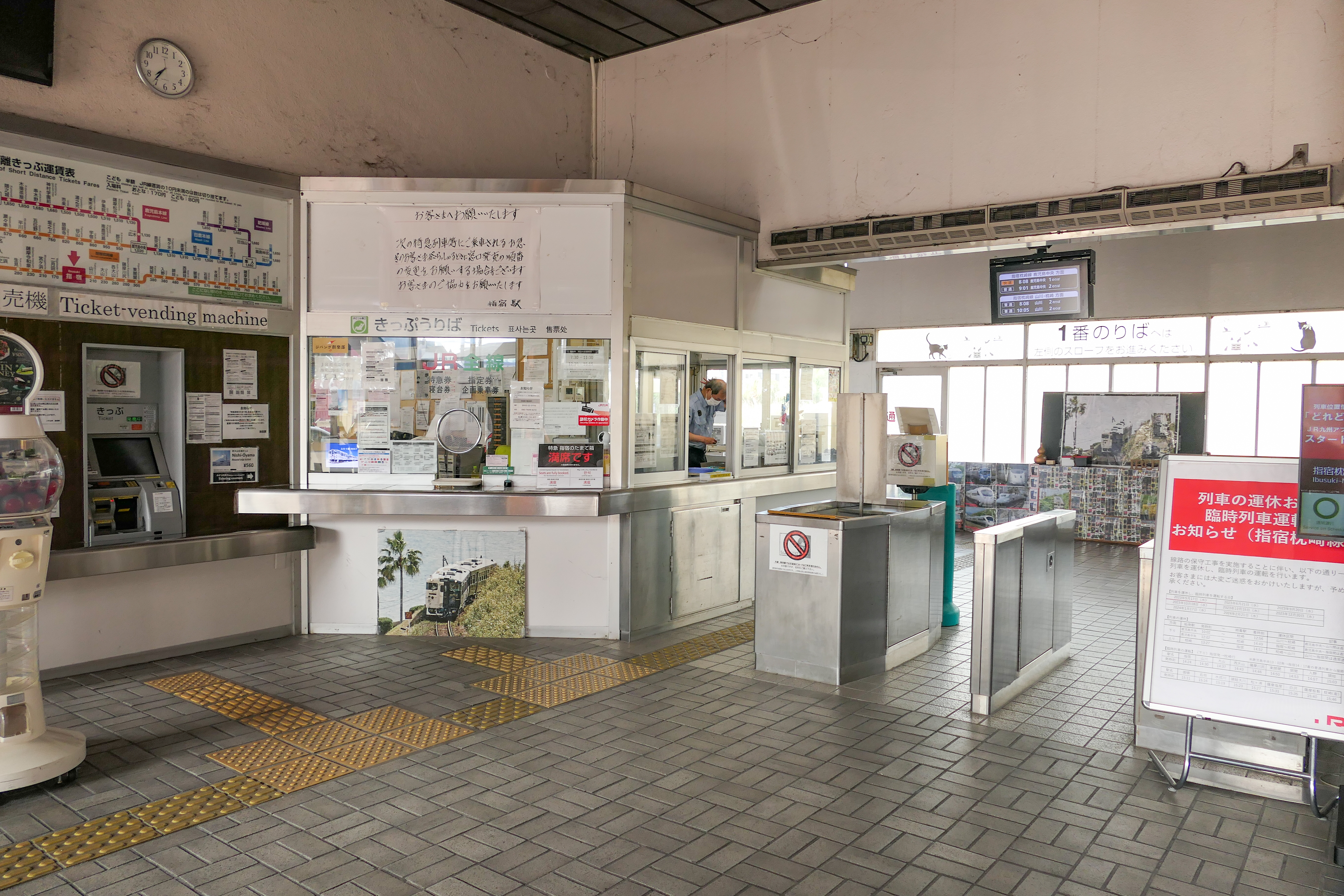
Ticket gate

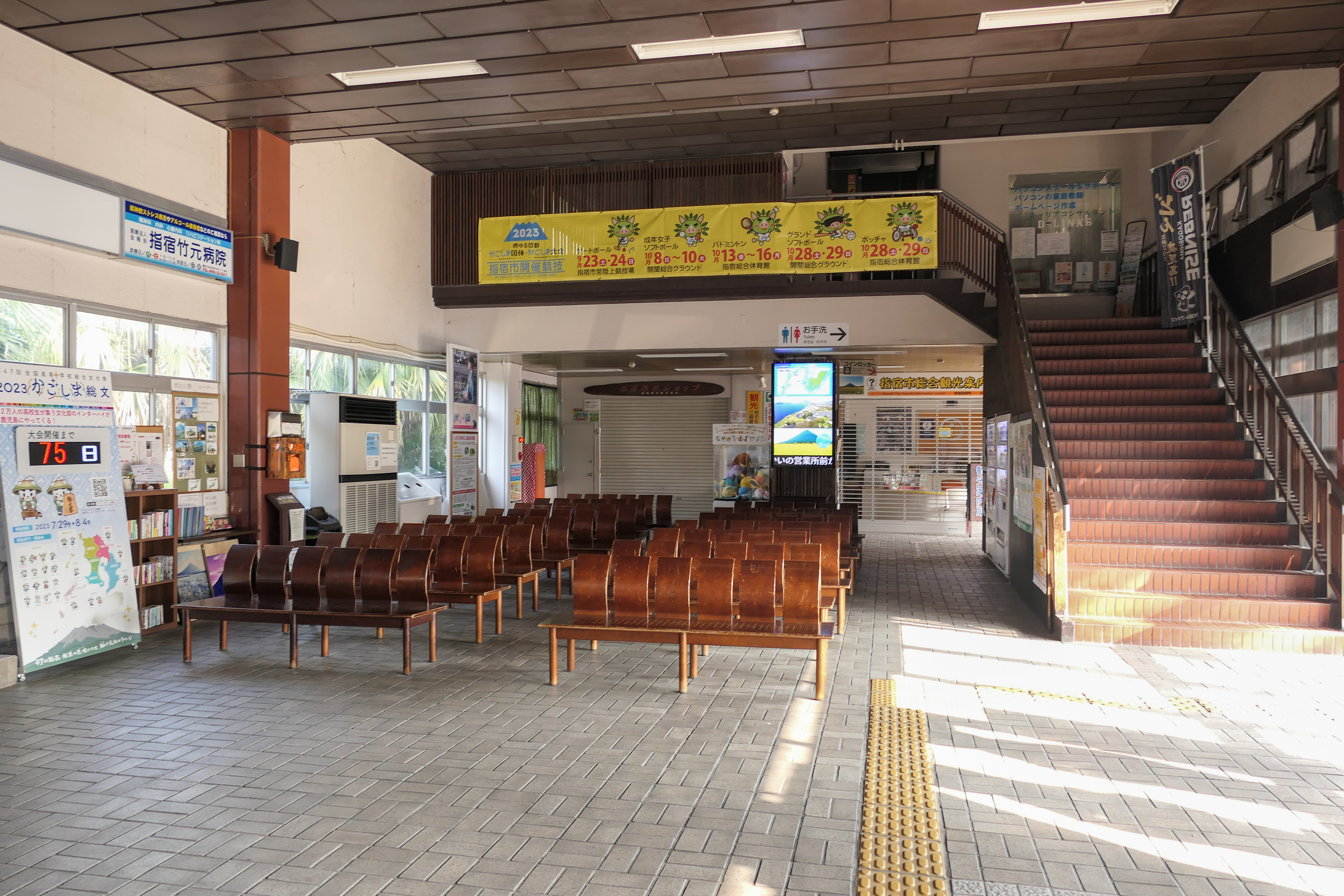
Waiting Room

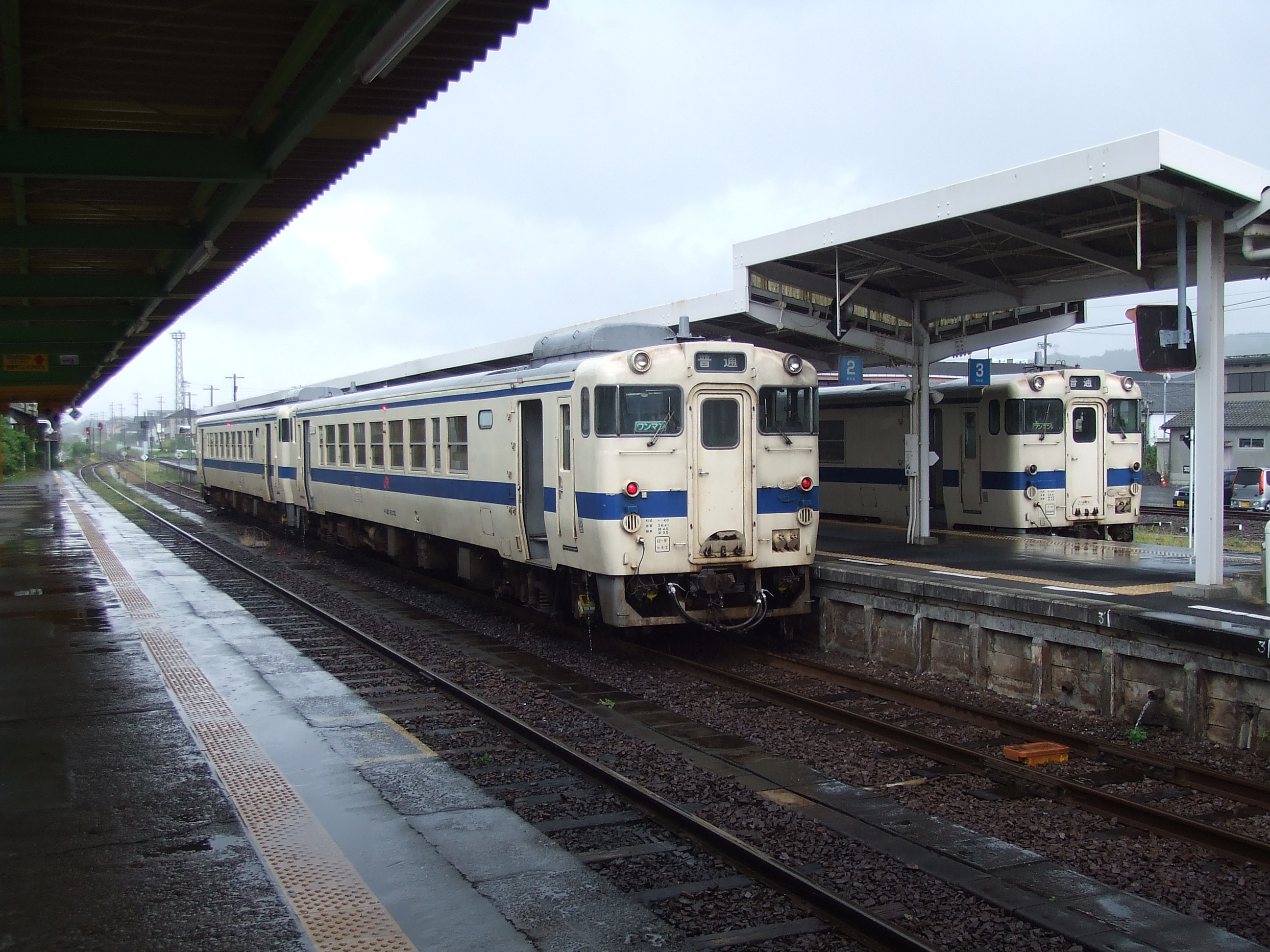
Platform

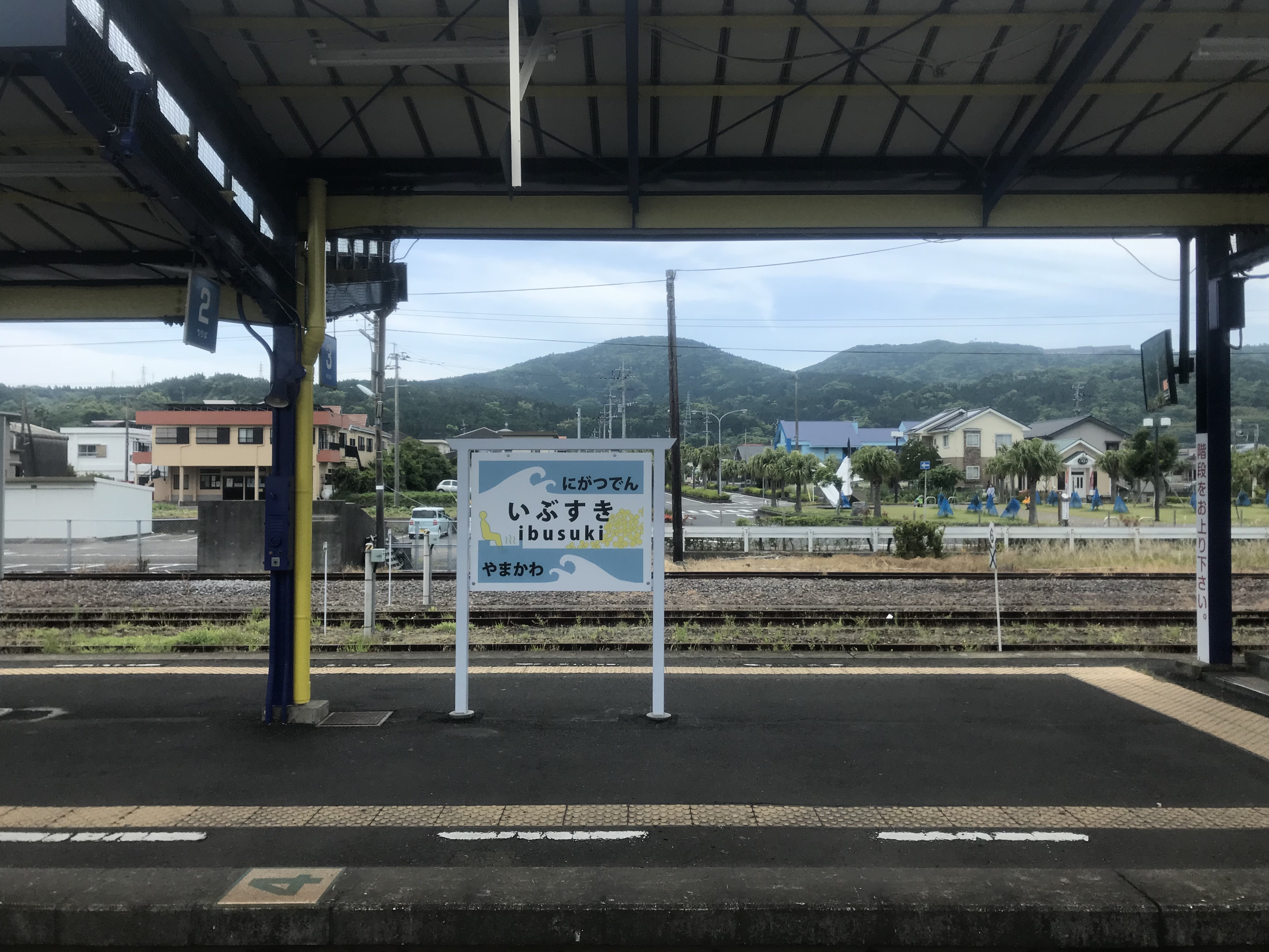
Station sign

== History ==
Japanese Government Railways (JGR) had opened the then Ibusuki Line (指宿線) from Nishi-Kagoshima (now Kagoshima-Chūō, which had reached Goino by 7 December 1930 and Kiire by 20 May 1934. In the next phase of expansion, the track was extended further south and Ibusuki opened as the new southern terminus on 19 December 1934. It became a through-station on 25 March 1936 when the track was further extended to Yamakawa. On 31 October 1963, the line which served the station was renamed the Ibusuki Makurazaki Line. With the privatization of Japanese National Railways (JNR), the successor of JGR, on 1 April 1987, the station came under the control of JR Kyushu.

== Passenger statistics ==
In fiscal 2020, the station was used by an average of 391 passengers daily (boarding passengers only), and it ranked 245th among the busiest stations of JR Kyushu.

== Surrounding area ==
- Ibusuki City Hall
- Ibusuki Onsen

== See also ==
- List of railway stations in Japan
