= Kagoshima-Chūō Station =

Railway station in Kagoshima, Kagoshima Prefecture, Japan

Kagoshima-Chūō Station 鹿児島中央駅
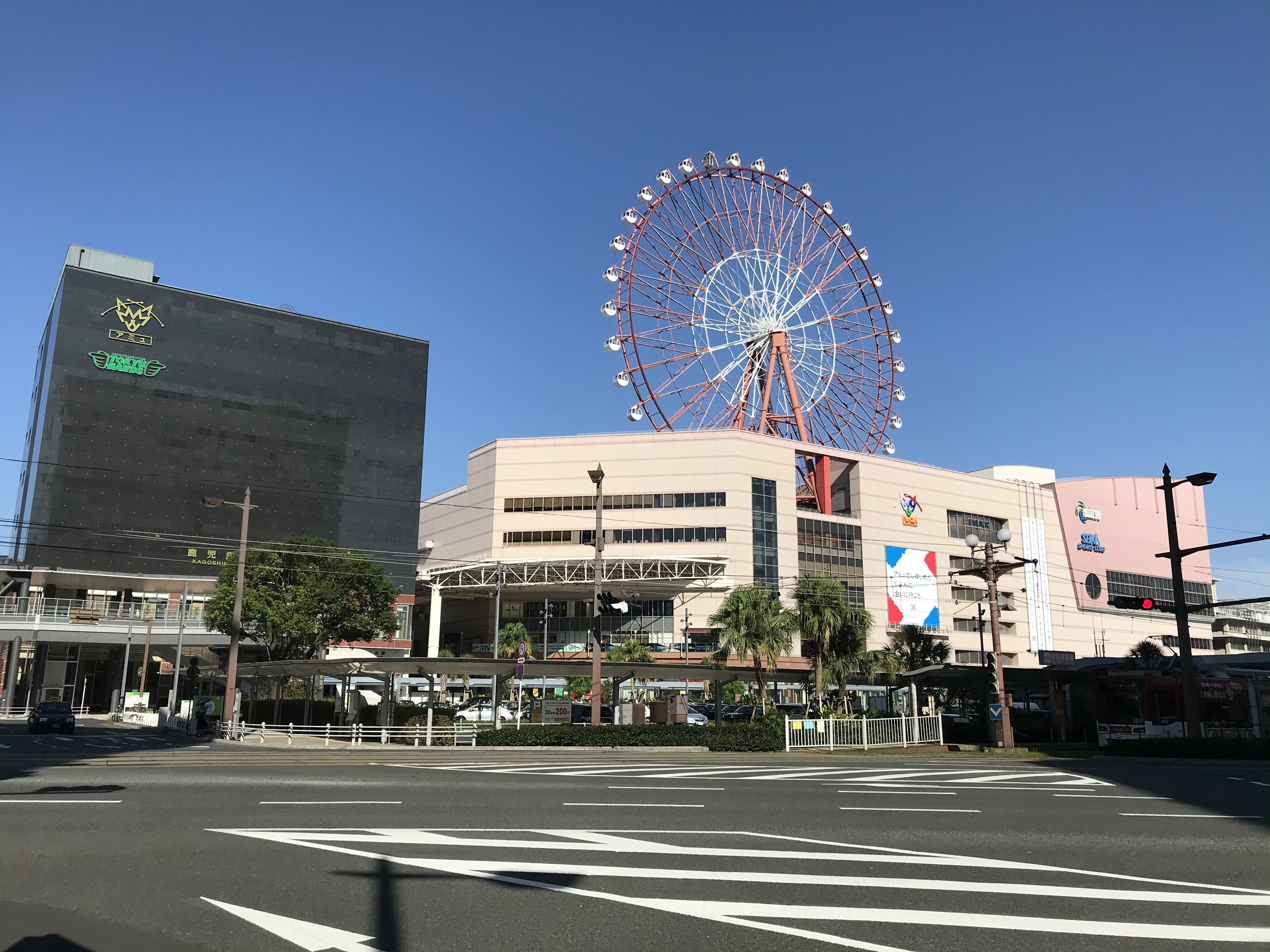
- Kagoshima-Chūō Station in October 2020

General information
- Location: 1-1 Chūō-chō, Kagoshima-shi, Kagoshima-ken; Japan
- Coordinates: 31°35′01″N 130°32′30″E
- Operator: JR Kyushu; Kagoshima City Transportation Bureau
- Lines: Kyūshū Shinkansen; Kagoshima Main Line; Ibusuki Makurazaki Line
- Platforms: 5 island platforms
- Connections: Bus terminal

Other information
- Website: Official website

History
- Opened: 11 October 1913
- Former names: Take (until 1927); Nishi-Kagoshima (until 2004)

Passengers
- FY2022: 14,013 daily
- Rank: 3rd (among JR Kyushu stations)

Services
Preceding station	JR Kyushu	Following station
Terminus	Kyūshū Shinkansen Mizuho Sakura Tsubame	Sendai towards Hakata
Kagoshima Terminus	Kagoshima Main Line	Ijūin towards Mojikō
Terminus	Kagoshima Main Line Ocean Liner Satsuma	Hiroki towards Mojikō
Terminus	Ibusuki Makurazaki Line	Kōrimoto towards Makurazaki
Location
- Location within Kagoshima Prefecture Location within Kyushu Location within Japan

Kagoshima-Chūō Station (鹿児島中央駅, Kagoshima-Chūō-eki; lit. Kagoshima Central Station) is a major railway station in the city of Kagoshima, Japan. Operated by the Kyushu Railway Company (JR Kyushu), it is the main railway terminal serving Kagoshima and is also the southernmost high-speed Shinkansen railway terminal in Japan.

== Lines ==
The station is the southern terminus of the Kyushu Shinkansen and is located 288.9 km from Hakata and 1463.8 km from Tokyo. It is also served by the Kagoshima Main Line and the Nippo Main Line and is 395.3 km from Mojiko. It is also the northern terminus of the 87.8 kilometer Ibusuki-Makurazaki Line.

== Layout ==
The conventional portion of the station consists of three ground-level island platforms and six tracks laid in a roughly north-south direction, while the Shinkansen portion of the station is elevated (three stories) with two island platforms and four tracks laid in a right-angle. The Shinkansen platform can accommodate trains of up to eight cars in length (can be extended to ten cars), and has a movable platform safety fence. The station building is located on the second floor, halfway between the conventional line platform and the Shinkansen platform, and the exits are connected by a concourse. The station has a Midori no Madoguchi staffed ticket office.

=== Platforms ===
1	■ Ibusuki-Makurazaki Line	for Goino, Ibusuki, and Yamakawa
2-4	■ Kagoshima Main Line	for Ijūin, Kushikino, and Sendai
2-4	■ Nippō Main Line	for Kagoshima, Hayato, and Miyazaki
2-4	■ Ibusuki-Makurazaki Line	for Goino, Ibusuki, and Yamakawa
5/6	■ Kagoshima Main Line	for Ijūin, Kushikino, and Sendai
5/6	■ Nippō Main Line	for Kagoshima, Hayato, and Miyazaki
11-14	Kyushu Shinkansen	for Kumamoto, Hakata, and Shin-Osaka

== History ==
Kagoshima-Chūō initially opened on October 11, 1913 as Take Station (武駅, Take-eki) on the Sendai Line. On December 17, 1915, the adjacent Take Ekimae tram stop (武駅前停留所) opened.

Take Station changed its name to Nishi-Kagoshima Station (西鹿児島駅) on October 17, 1927, with the Take Ekimae tram stop being renamed Nishi-Kagoshima Ekimae tram stop (西鹿児島駅前停留所) on August 7, 1928.

On March 13, 2004, Nishi-Kagoshima Station was renamed Kagoshima-Chūō Station (鹿児島中央駅), and Kyushu Shinkansen services began between Shin-Yatsushiro and Kagoshima-Chūō. The Nishi-Kagoshima Ekimae tram stop was renamed the Kagoshima-Chuo Ekimae tram stop (鹿児島中央駅前停留所).

== Passenger statistics ==
In fiscal 2020, the station was used by an average of 14,013 passengers daily (boarding passengers only), and it ranked 3rd among the busiest stations of JR Kyushu.

== Surrounding areas ==
- Kagoshima-Chūō Ekimae tram stop
- Amu Plaza Kagoshima and Amuran Ferris wheel
- Kagoshima Central Post Office
- Museum of the Meiji Restoration
- Naples Avenue (ナポリ通り, Napori-dōri)
- Kagoshima Prefectural Konan High School
- Kagoshima Prefectural Tsurumaru High School

== Trains ==
=== Limited Express trains ===
- Kirishima - Nippō Main Line
- Ibusuki no Tamatebako - Ibusuki Makurazaki Line

=== Liner and Rapid trains ===
- Nanohana - Ibusuki Makurazaki Line
- Ocean Liner Satsuma - Kagoshima Main Line

== Ekiben ==
- Tonkatsu bento, a bento with tonkatsu available as ekiben, is a local specialty consisting of Kagoshima pork ribs simmered in shōchū, miso, and black sugar for over five hours.

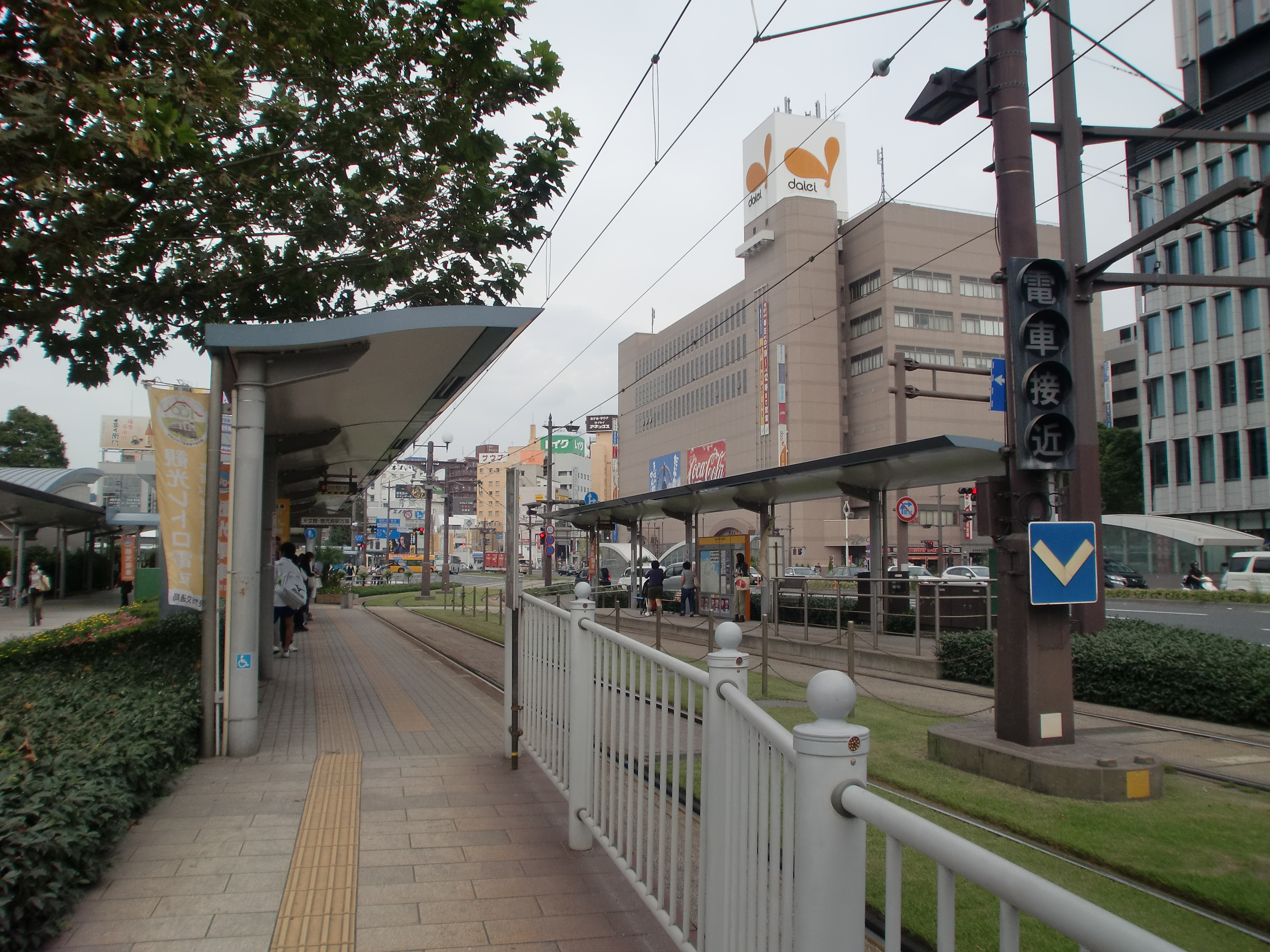
Kagoshima-Chūō Ekimae tram stop

== See also ==
- List of railway stations in Japan
