= Makurazaki Station =

Railway station in Makurazaki, Kagoshima Prefecture, Japan

Makurazaki Station 枕崎駅
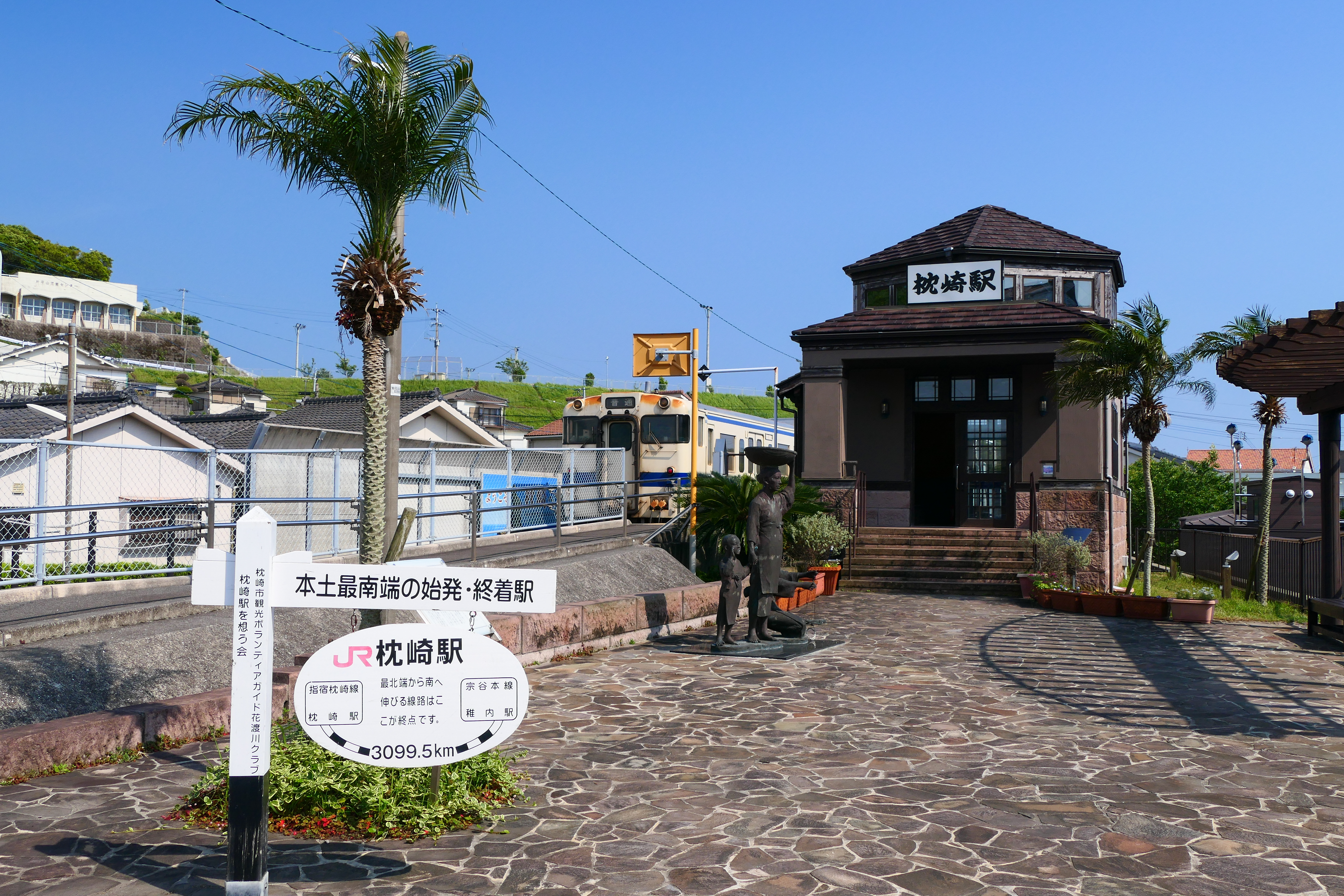
- Makurazaki Station, May 2023

General information
- Location: Higashihonmachi, Makurazaki-shi, Kagoshima-ken 898-0014; Japan
- Coordinates: 31°16′19.64″N 130°17′58.14″E
- Operator: JR Kyushu
- Line: ■ Ibusuki Makurazaki Line
- Distance: 87.8 km from Kagoshima-Chūō
- Platforms: 1 side platform

Other information
- Status: Unstaffed
- Website: Official website

History
- Opened: 31 October 1963

Passengers
- FY2015: 25 daily

Services
Preceding station	JR Kyushu	Following station
Satsuma-Itashiki towards Kagoshima-Chūō	Ibusuki Makurazaki Line	Terminus
Location
- Location within Kagoshima Prefecture Location within Japan

Makurazaki Station (枕崎駅, Makurazaki-eki) is a passenger railway station located in the city of Makurazaki, Kagoshima Prefecture, Japan. It is operated by JR Kyushu. It is the southernmost conventional rail terminal station in Japan.

== Lines ==
The station is the southern terminus of the Ibusuki Makurazaki Line and is located 87.8 km from the opposing terminus of the line at Kagoshima-Chūō.

== Layout ==
This is an unstaffed station with one side platform. The station building was built with donations from citizens, and features a statue of Yamasachihiko inside and a statue of a katsuobushi seller outside.

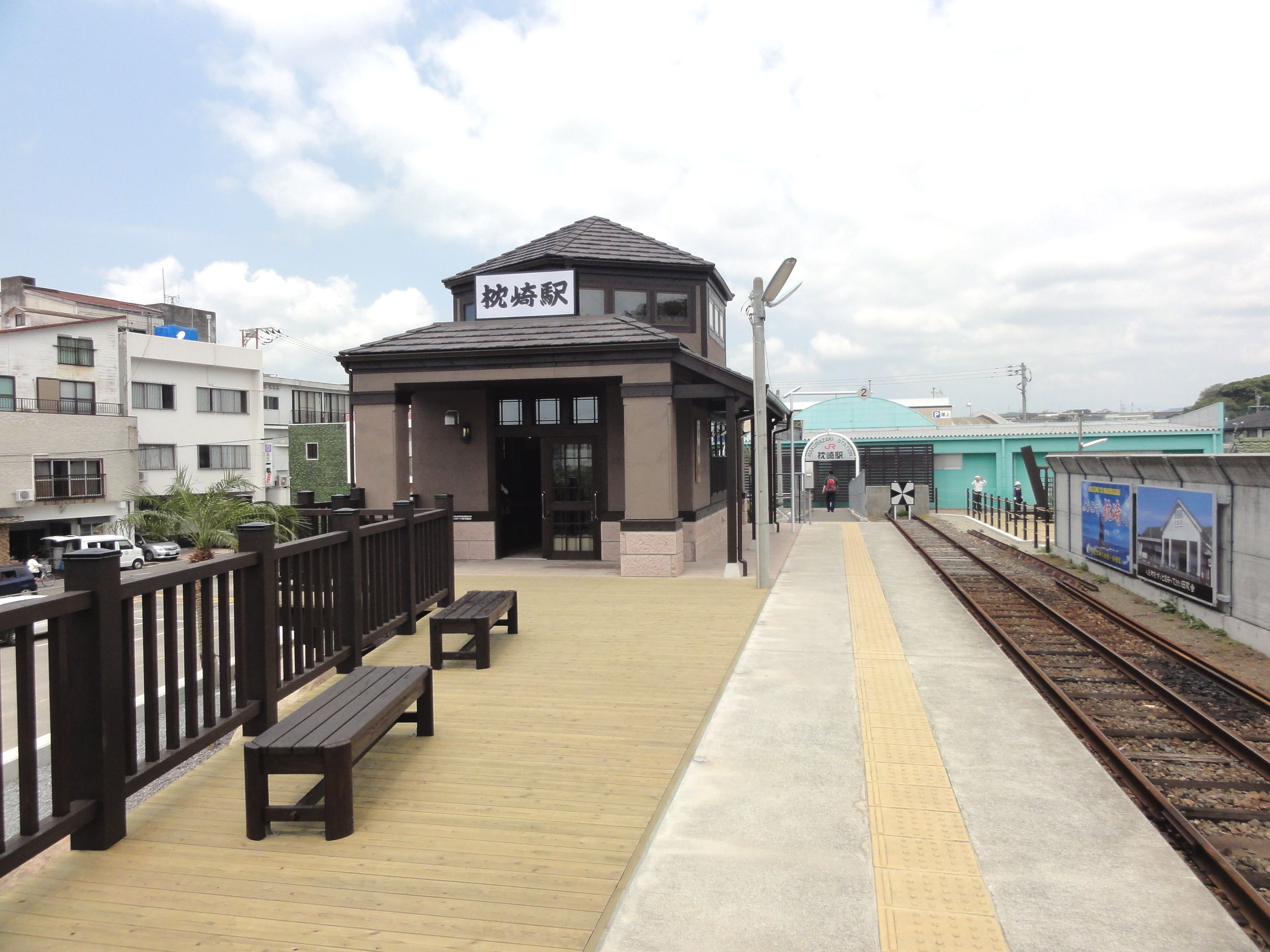
Station building and platform

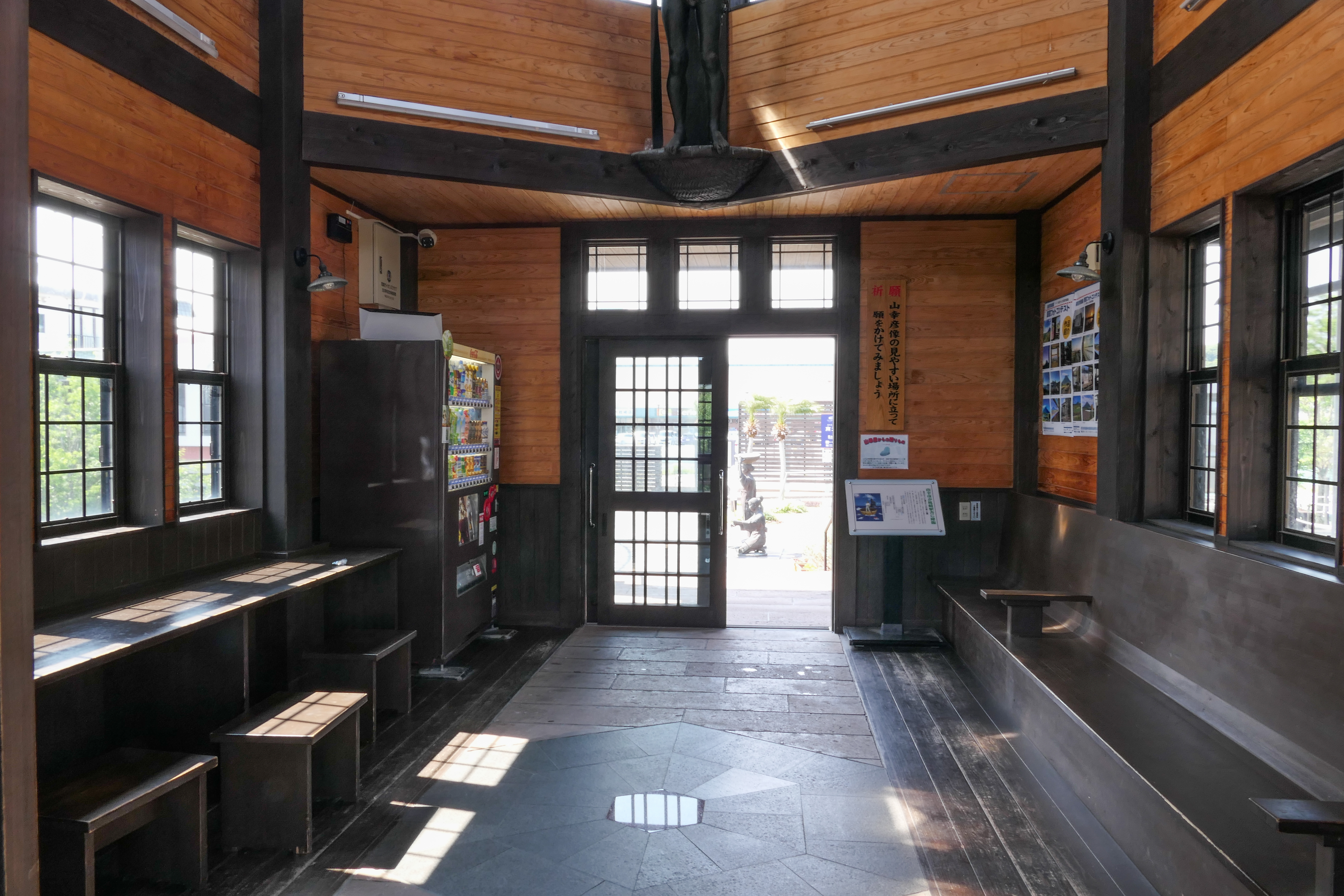
Inside station building

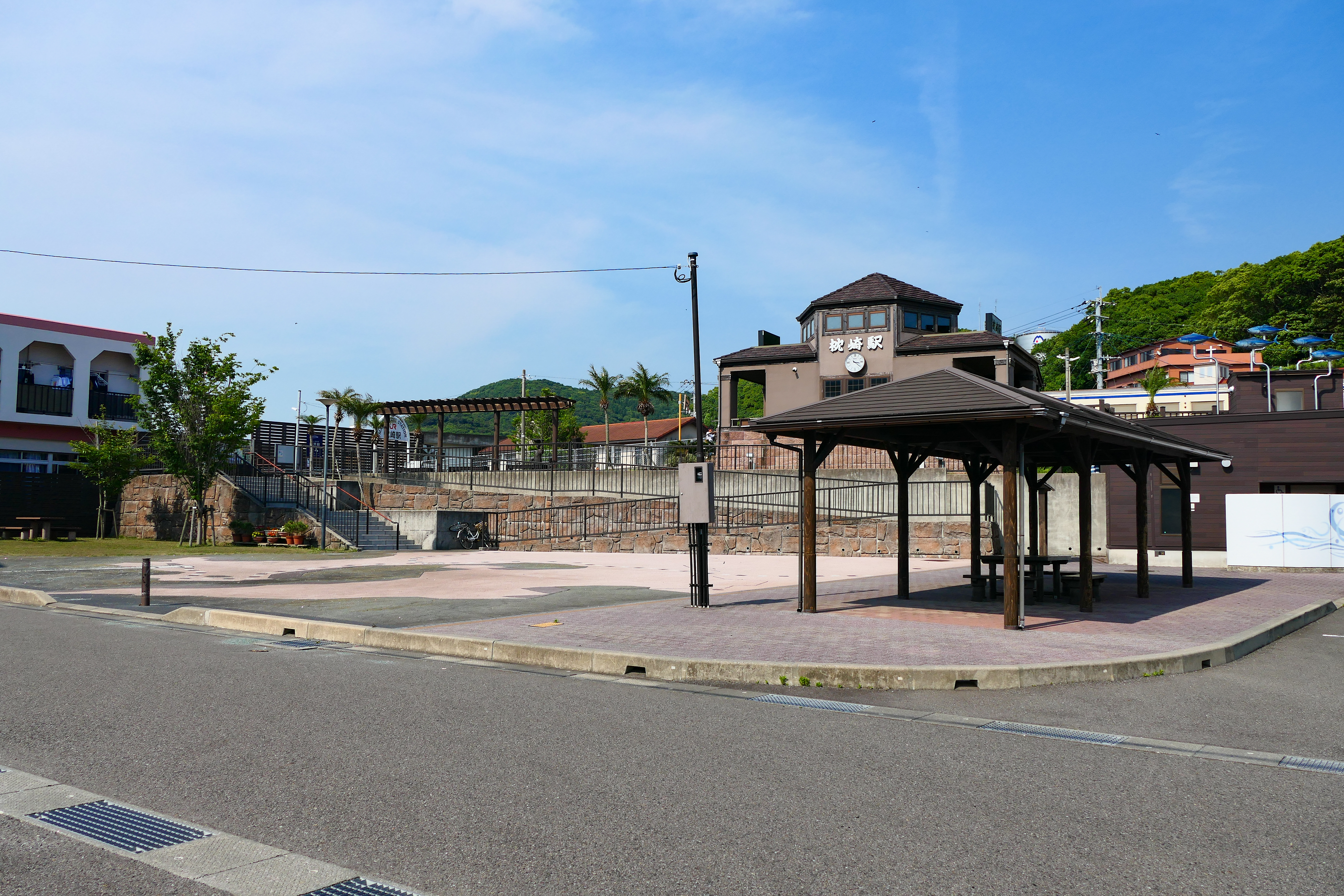
Station plaza

== History ==
The station opened on March 10, 1931, when private Nansatsu Railway (now Kagoshima Kotsu) extended the Makurazaki Line from Kaseda to Makurazaki. The old station building was owned by the same company until its demolishment in 2006. The station began to serve two lines when the Ibusuki Makurazaki Line of Japanese National Railways (JNR) was extended from Nishi-Ei to Makurazaki on October 31, 1963. The JNR paid access charges to Nansatsu Railway for the use of the station, and the station was not counted as an official JNR station until the subsequent closure of the Makurazaki Line.

The operation of the Makurazaki Line was suspended on June 21, 1983, due to a flood. The line was abandoned and officially closed on March 18, 1984. Only the Ibusuki Makurazaki Line has served the station since then.

In 2006, the land on which the station stood was sold to Taiyo, a local supermarket chain. As a result, on May 1, 2006, the station was moved approximately 100 meters towards Kagoshima. The new station on opening had no station building, but one was subsequently constructed from local donation funding. Unveiled on April 28, 2013, the new building received the Good Design Award in the same year.

== Passenger statistics ==
In fiscal 2015, the station was used by an average of 25 passengers daily.

== Surrounding area ==
- Taiyo Market Store
- Makurazaki Port
- Makurazaki City Hall
- Makurazaki-Nagisa HotSpa

== See also ==
- List of railway stations in Japan
