= Minamikyūshū =

Minamikyūshū 南九州市
- City
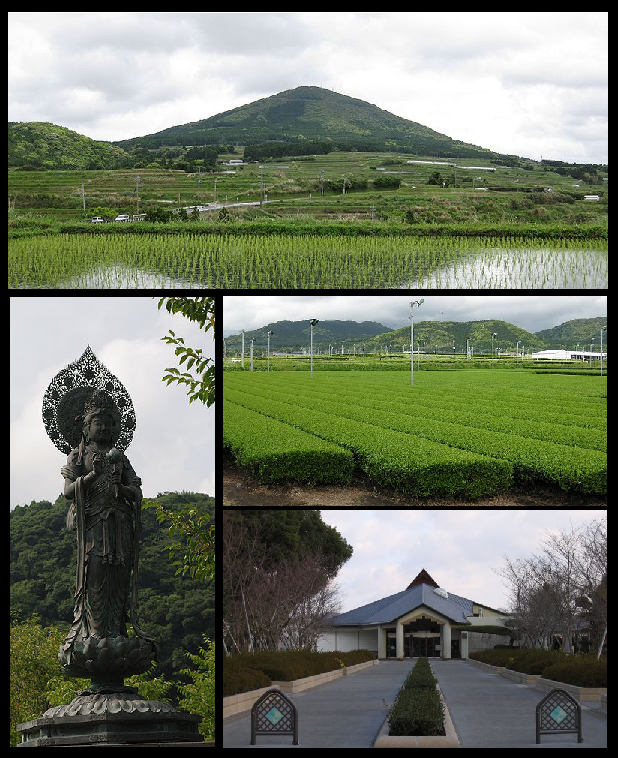
- From top:Mount Ōno, statue of Buddha at Shimizu-iwaya Park, tea plantation, Chiran-Tokkō Heiwa Hall

- Flag Emblem
- Interactive map of Minamikyūshū
- Location in Japan
- Coordinates: 31°22′42″N 130°26′30″E
- Country: Japan
- Region: Kyushu
- Prefecture: Kagoshima

Government
  - Mayor: Hiroyuki Nuruki

Area
  - Total: 357.91 km^{2} (138.19 sq mi)

Population (June 30, 2024)
  - Total: 31,666
  - Density: 88.475/km^{2} (229.15/sq mi)
- Time zone: UTC+09:00 (JST)
- City hall address: 6204 Chiran-cho kōri, Minamikyushu-shi, Kagoshima-ken 897-0392
- Website: www.city.minamikyushu.lg.jp
- Symbols
- Flower: Sunflower
- Tree: Cherry blossom, Tea

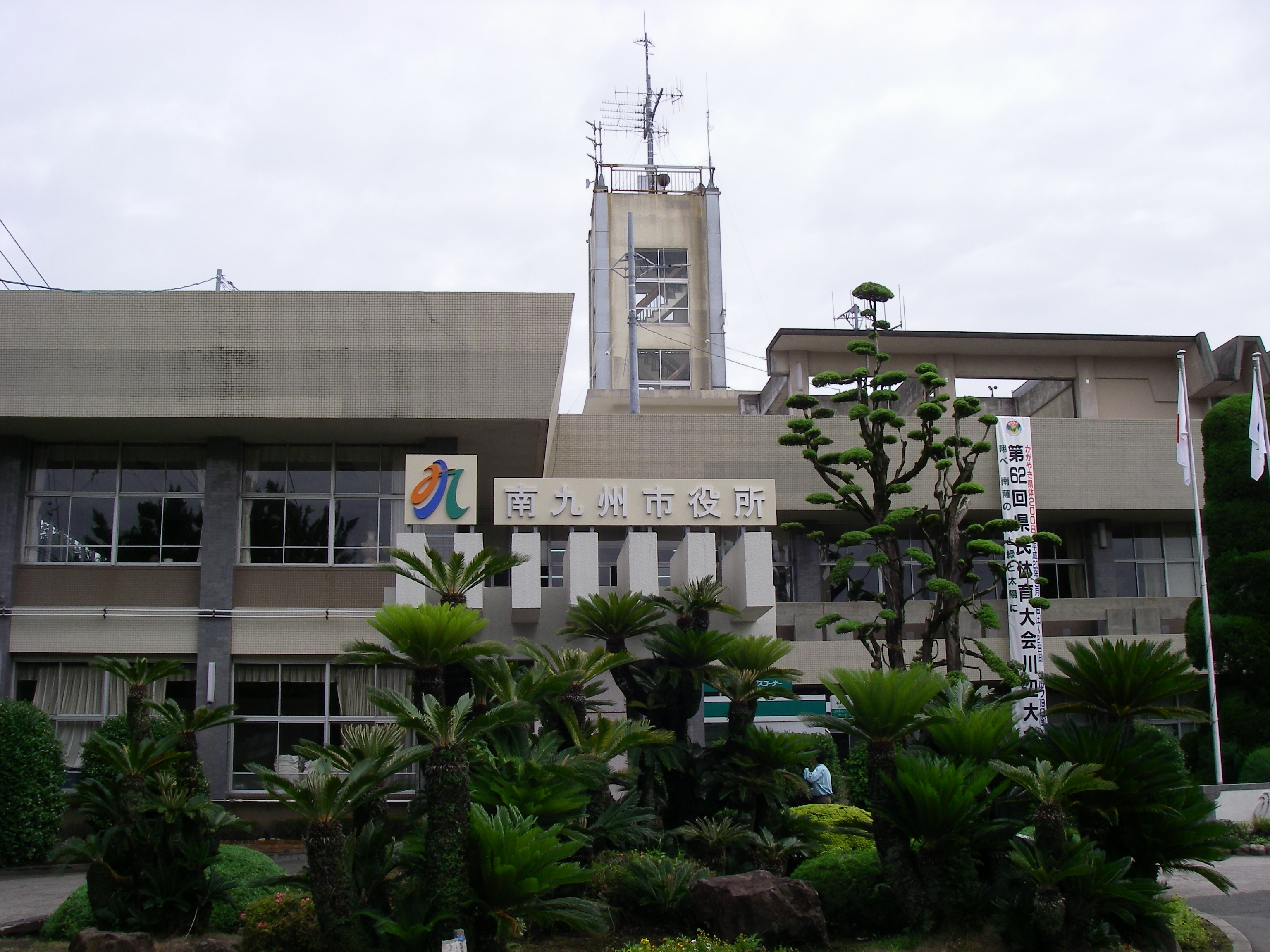
Minamikyūshū City Hall

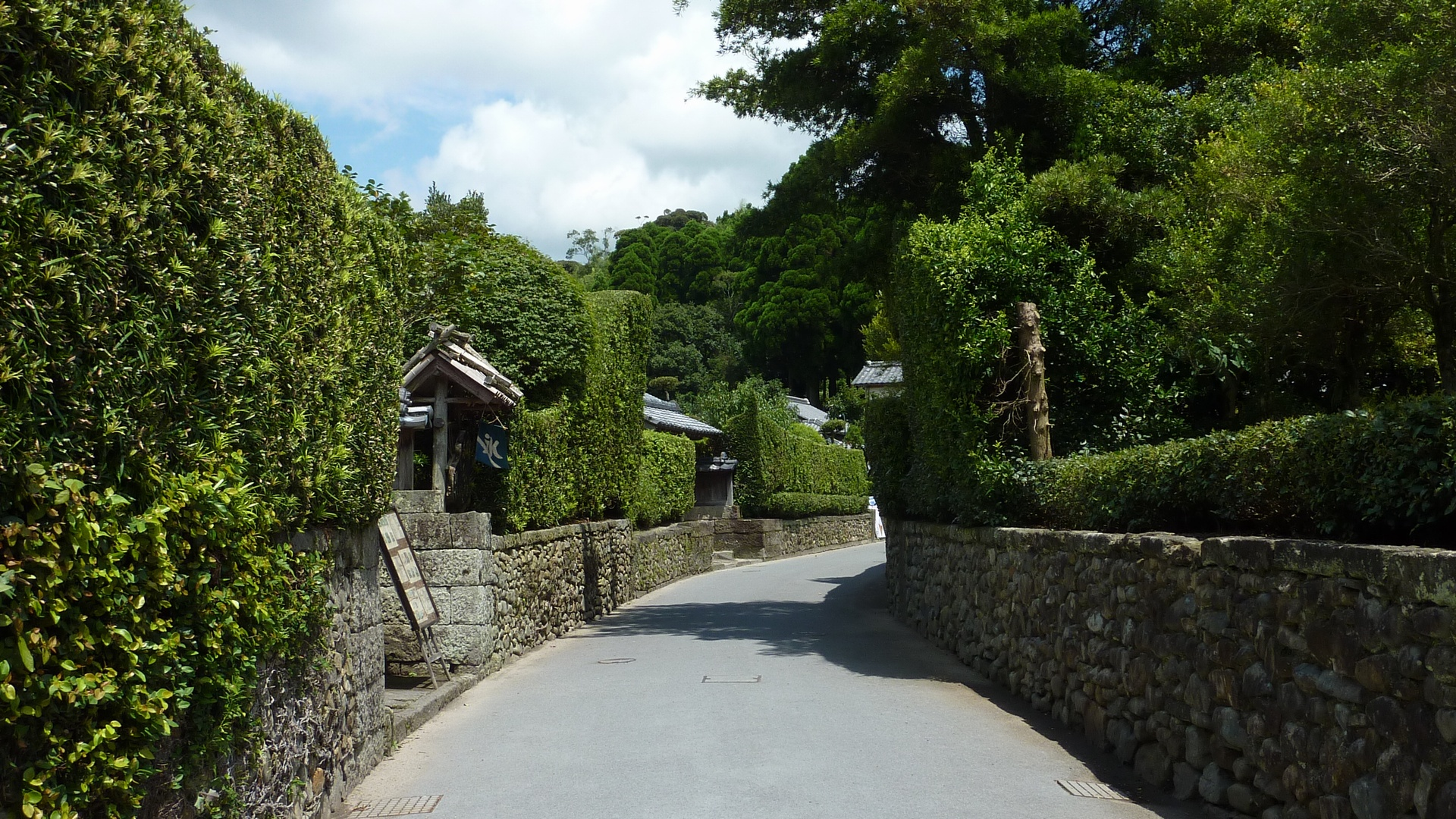
Chiran Historical Preservation District

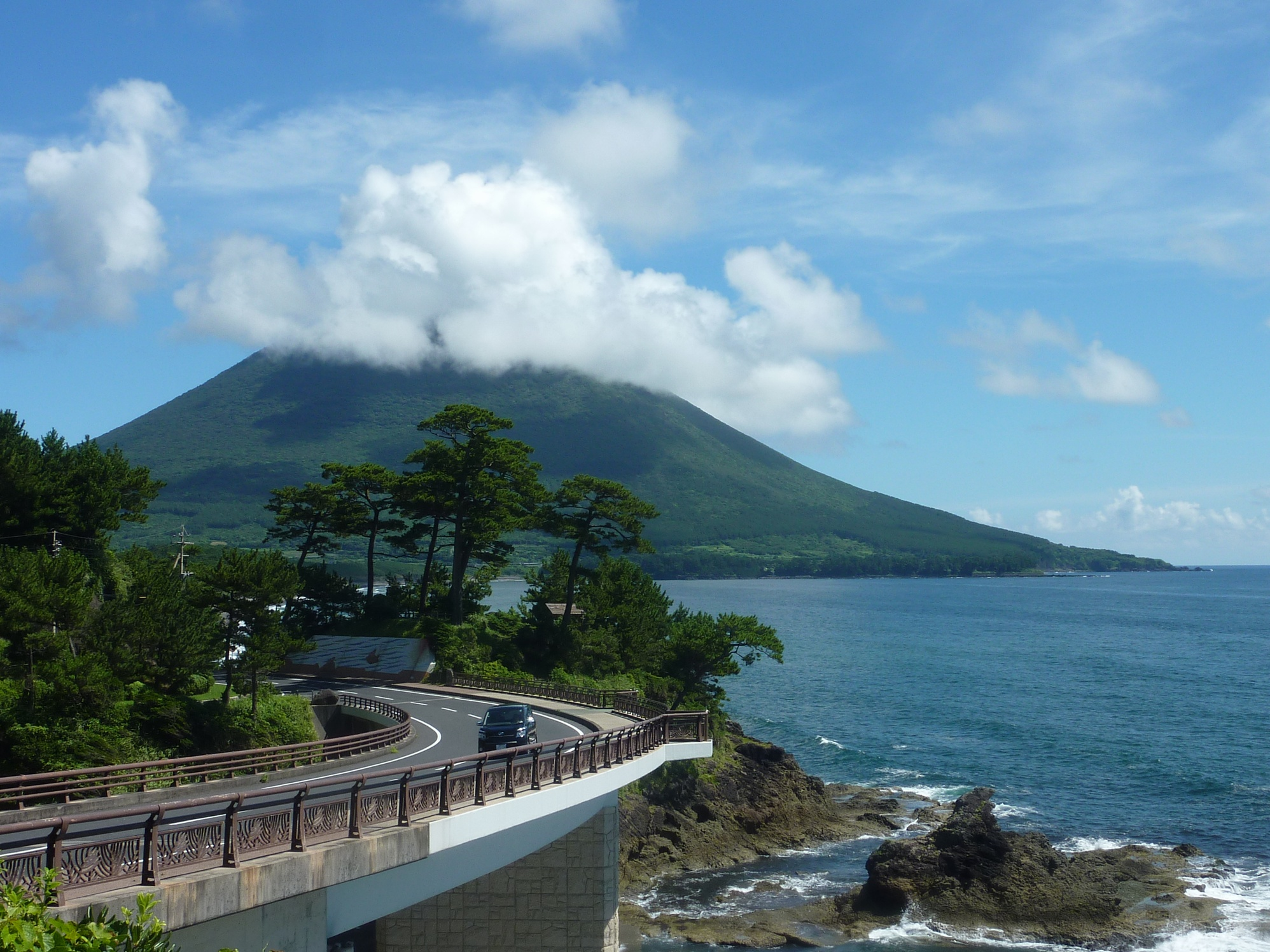
Japan National Route 226 in Ei

Minamikyūshū (南九州市, Minamikyūshū-shi; lit. "South Kyushu City") is a city in Kagoshima Prefecture, Japan. As of 30 June 2024, the city had an estimated population of 31,666 in 16189 households, and a population density of 180 persons per km^{2}. The total area of the city is 357.91 km^{2} (138.19 sq mi).

== Geography ==
Minamikyūshū is located in the southern part of the Satsuma Peninsula, about 30 kilometers southwest of the city of Kagoshima, and faces the East China Sea to the south.

=== Adjacent municipalities ===
Kagoshima Prefecture

- Ibusuki
- Kagoshima
- Makurazaki
- Minamisatsuma

=== Climate ===
Minamikyūshū has a humid subtropical climate (Köppen Cfa) characterized by warm summers and cool winters with light to no snowfall. The average annual temperature in Minamikyūshū is 17.4 °C. The average annual rainfall is 2303 mm with September as the wettest month. The temperatures are highest on average in August, at around 26.6 °C, and lowest in January, at around 8.0 °C.

=== Demographics ===
Per Japanese census data, the population of Minamikyūshū is as shown below:

Historical population
Year	Pop.	±%
1950	82,021	—
1960	74,059	−9.7%
1970	56,744	−23.4%
1980	50,261	−11.4%
1990	47,498	−5.5%
2000	44,137	−7.1%
2010	39,065	−11.5%
2020	33,080	−15.3%

== History ==
The area of Minamikyūshū is part of ancient Satsuma Province and was part of the holdings of Satsuma Domain in the Edo period. On April 1, 1889, the village of Chiran in Kyuri District, villages of Kawabe and Katsume in Kawabe District, and village of Ei in Ewa District were established with the creation of the modern municipalities system. Kawabe was raised to town status on October 13, 1923, followed by Chiran on April 1, 1932, and Ei on August 1, 1950. Kawabe absorbed Katsume on September 1, 1956. On December 1, 2007 Kawanabe, Chiran and Ei merged to form the city of Minamikyūshū.

== Government ==
Minamikyūshū has a mayor-council form of government with a directly elected mayor and a unicameral city council of 20 members. Minamikyūshū contributes one member to the Kagoshima Prefectural Assembly. In terms of national politics, the city is part of the Kagoshima 2nd district of the lower house of the Diet of Japan.

== Economy ==
The economy of Minamikyūshū is agricultural. It is the largest producer of tea in Japan, and is famous for its "Chiran tea".

== Education ==
Minamikyūshū has 17 public elementary schools and five public junior high schools by the city government, and three public high schools operated by the Kagoshima Prefectural Board of Education.

== Transportation ==
=== Railways ===
JR Kyushu - Ibusuki Makurazaki Line

■ Ei - Nishi-Ei - Goryō - Ishikaki - Mizunarikawa - Ei-Ōkawa - Matsugaura - Satsuma-Shioya

=== Highways ===
- Minamikyushu Expressway
- National Route 225
- National Route 226

== Local attractions ==
- Chiran Castle ruins, National Historic Site
- Chiran Peace Museum for Kamikaze Pilots
- Chiran Samurai District - preserved samurai district with residence and garden in the Edo period.

== Notable people from Minamikyūshū ==
- Chinatsu Akasaki, voice actress
- Isamu Akasaki, engineer, 2014 Nobel Prize in Physics winner
- Hiroshi Sato, singer-songwriter, musician
- Hiroko Yamasaki, former Japanese rhythmic gymnast.
