= Ōkawa Station (disambiguation) =

Ōkawa Station (大川駅, Ōkawa Station) may refer to:

- Ōkawa Station (大川駅), on the JR East Tsurumi Line Ōkawa Branch Line in Kawasaki-ku, Kawasaki, Kanagawa Prefecture, Japan

Other stations with similar names include:

- Iwate-Ōkawa Station (岩手大川駅), on the JR East Iwaizumi Line in Iwaizumi, Iwate Prefecture, Japan
- Izu-Ōkawa Station (伊豆大川駅), on the Izu-ky Line izu-kyūkō Line Higashiizu, Shizuoka Prefecture, Japan
- Satsuma-Ōkawa Station (薩摩大川駅), on the Hisatsu Orange Railway Line in Akune, Kagoshima Prefecture, Japan
- Ei-Ōkawa Station (頴娃大川駅), on the JR Kyūshū Ibusuki Makurazaki Line in Minamikyūshū, Kagoshima Prefecture, Japan
