= Ata Tadakage =

Japanese de facto ruler

Ata Tadakage (阿多忠景), also known as Taira no Tadakage (平忠景), was a de facto ruler of Satsuma Province during the late Heian period of Japan.

== Life ==
Ata Tadakage was a son of Izaku Yoshimichi. He was a distant relative of Taira no Suemoto, who founded the Shimazu Estate in the 1020s. His name was first attested in a contemporary source in 1138. At that time he was the governor of Ata District, Satsuma Province. He killed his eldest brother Kawanabe Michifusa and banished Michifusa's son Michihira from Satsuma. Fragmentary sources show that he gradually expanded the sphere of his influence in Satsuma. He gained the title of Provisional Governor of Shimotsuke Province in 1150. A document, dated 1162, suggests that he had power to influence the neighboring Ōsumi Province. It is presumed that he was affiliated with Minamoto no Tametomo, a legendary warrior from the Minamoto clan, who stayed in Kyūshū from 1151 to 1155. It is thought that his daughter married Tametomo.

Ata Tadakage's rise to power was seen as a rebellion by the central government, which was then controlled by Taira no Kiyomori. Around 1160, probably after the Heiji Rebellion, an imperial decree was issued to punish him. The punitive expedition was led by Taira no Iesada, a retainer of Taira no Kiyomori. Tadakage fled to an island named Kikai-ga-shima. Due to high waves and strong winds, Iesada was unable to track Tadakage down, and he disappeared from history.

=== Modern research ===
Ata Tadakage drew attention from historians and archaeologists in the 1990s when the Mottaimatsu Site was excavated. The archaeological site is located on the northern bank of the Manose River, which served as Ata District's southern border. It was at its peak from the middle 12th century to the first half of the 13th century. It is considered to have served as a trade center connected to Hakata–Dazaifu of northern Kyūshū and to the Southern Islands since it had a huge variety of goods including Kamuiyaki, a large number of Chinese ceramics such as Longquan celadon and Tong'an celadon, and in smaller quantity, sue ware from eastern Harima Province, and Tokoname-yaki from Owari Province. The profitable trade was probably the source of his power.

Kikai-ga-shima, the island where Tadakage took refuge, has often been identified as Iōjima, an island located about 110 kilometers south of Kyūshū. However, historian Nagayama Shūichi identified it as Kikai Island of the Amami Islands. He argued that since Iōjima had been used as an island of exile by the central government, it could not be a safe haven for Tadakage.

== Aftermath ==
Ata Tadakage was succeeded by Ata Nobusumi, who married Tadakage's daughter. Nobusumi survived Taira no Kiyomori's dominion. Kiyomori controlled the Shimazu Estate, which covered a large portion of Satsuma Province, while he appointed his younger brother Tadanori Governor of Satsuma Province. It is likely that the Taira clan's domination of southern Kyūshū was aimed at controlling Japan's trade with Song China. After the Genpei War, the newly established Kamakura shogunate seized Ata Nobusumi's territories in 1192 for his affiliation with the Taira clan and gave Ata District to Samejima Muneie. However, Tadakage's relatives continued to prosper as Samejima Muneie married a daughter of Tadakage's younger brother and adopted son Tadayoshi.

In 1187, the future first shōgun Minamoto no Yoritomo dispatched Amano Tōkage and Utsunomiya Nobufusa to drive enemies out from Kikai-ga-shima. After initial failures, they successfully pacified the island in 1188. Archaeologist Takanashi Osamu noted that the Gusuku Site Complex on Kikai Island ceased to function in the first half of the 13th century although it re-emerged, albeit on a smaller scale, in the second half of the 13th century. Takanashi conjectured that Yoritomo's expedition to Kikai Island had effectively destroyed the Gusuku Site Complex's function as the trade center of the Southern Islands.

== See also ==
- Chikama Tokiie
