= Chiran Castle =

Castle ruins in Chiran, Japan

Coordinates: 31°22′2.8″N 130°26′37.4″E

- 知覧城
- Minamikyūshū, Kagoshima Prefecture, Japan
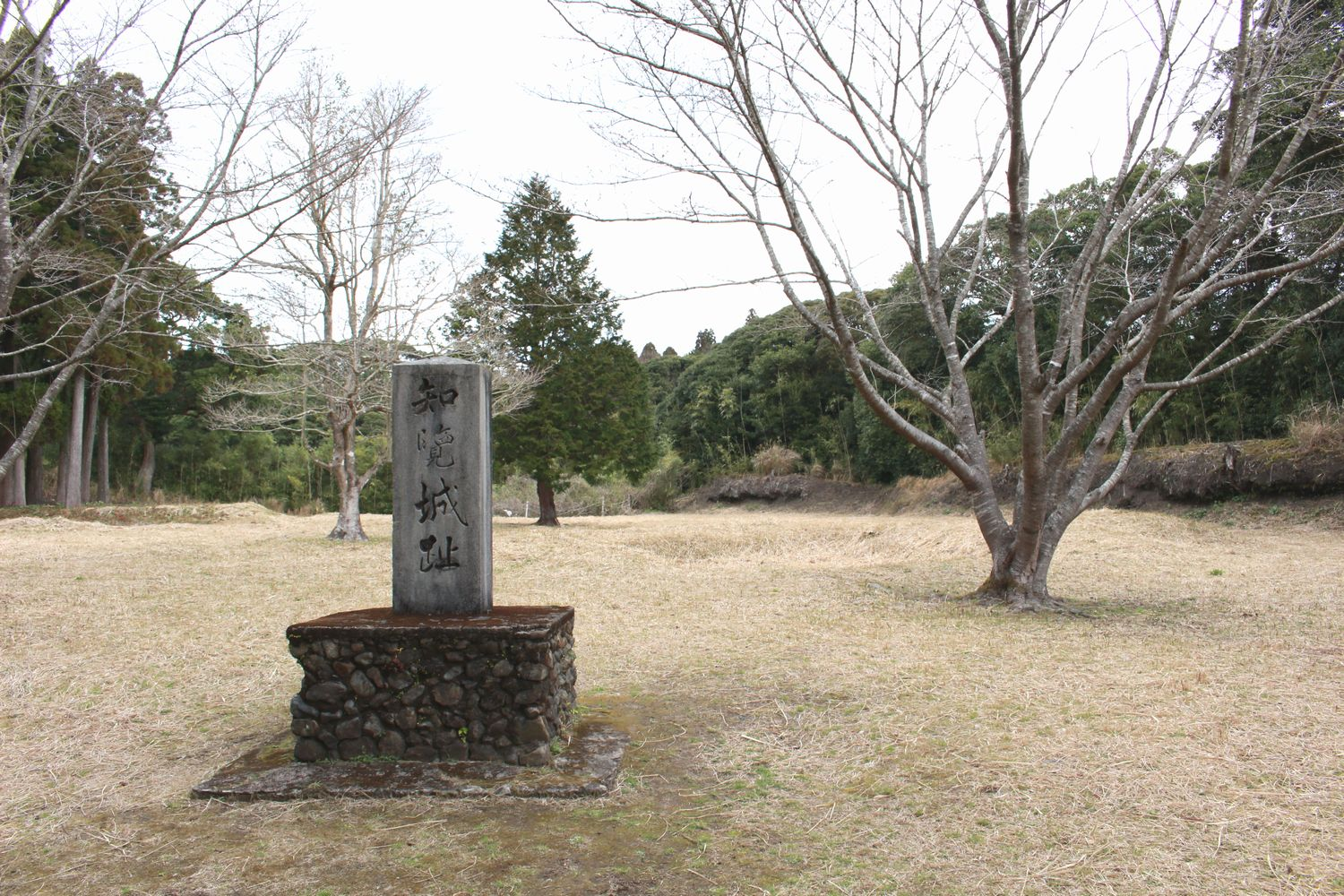
- Site of Chiran Castle

Site information
- Type: Hirayama style castle
- Controlled by: Sata clan/ Shimazu clan
- Open to the public: yes
- Condition: Archaeological and designated national historical site; castle ruins

Location

Site history
- Built: c.Kamakura period
- In use: Sengoku period
- Demolished: 1615

Garrison information
- Past commanders: Sata Hisamasa, Sata Hisayoshi
- National Historic Site of Japan

Chiran Castle (知覧城, Chiran-jō) was a Japanese castle located in the Chiran area of the city of Minamikyūshū, Kagoshima Prefecture, Japan. Its ruins were designated a National Historic Site in 1993.

== Overview ==
Chiran castle is located at a narrow point at the head of the Satsuma Peninsula overlooking a small valley formed by the Fumotogawa River, which forms part of the castle's defense network. This area is covered by volcanic ash consisting mostly of pumice, which is well-drained but largely unsuitable for rice cultivation. It is unknown when the castle was first constructed, but it is believed to have been in the 12th century by the local Chiran clan, around the time of the Shimazu shōen. During the Nanboku-chō period, the Shimazu clan supported either the Muromachi shogunate or Emperor Go-Daigo, using their geographic remoteness to play one power against the other, and replaced the Chiran clan with a cadet branch of the Shimazu called the Sata clan. However, from around 1400 the main branches of the Shimazu clan began an endless struggle against one another for domination of the clan. During this period, the Ijuin clan seized the west coast of Satsuma Peninsula, including the Chiran area. The Ijuin were defeated by the main Shimazu clan in 1427 and expelled from Chiran. In the Sengoku period, the Sata clan supported Shimazu Tadayoshi, his son Tadahisa and Tadahisa's four sons in their campaign to unify Kyushu under Shimazu rule. Sata Tadamasu was a high-ranking retainer of Shimazu Yoshihisa, and after the surrender of the Shimazu to Toyotomi Hideyoshi in 1587, he participated in Hideyoshi's battles against the Odawara Hōjō. However, the Sata clan was accused of piracy in 1591 and were dispossessed. The Sata clan returned to Chiran in 1610, but the castle burned down in 1615 and was abolished.

The castle town survived and was developed in the Edo Period as a residence for high ranking retainers of Satsuma Domain with the main street folded at the center for defense. Many of these samurai residences remain, and are protected by stone walls and hedges, and have Japanese gardens. The castle remains consists of over 10 terraces of different sized spreads about 250 meter long square, which are surrounded by vertical cliffs. The central area is roughly divided into north half and south half by valley. The central bailey is a square shaped are 50 meters long, at the east edge of north half. Each line of the area is protected by clay walls, and the entrance is built as a masugata-style compound gate. Many relics such as Chinese pottery, daily wares or iron objects have been found by archaeological excavation. In 2017, the castle was listed as one of the Continued Top 100 Japanese Castles.

The castle ruins are about 30-minutes from JR Kyushu Ibusuki-Makurazaki Line Hirakawa Station.

== Literature ==
- Benesch, Oleg and Ran Zwigenberg (2019). Japan's Castles: Citadels of Modernity in War and Peace. Cambridge: Cambridge University Press. p. 374. ISBN 9781108481946.
- De Lange, William (2021). An Encyclopedia of Japanese Castles. Groningen: Toyo Press. pp. 600 pages. ISBN 978-9492722300.

== See also ==
- List of Historic Sites of Japan (Kagoshima)
