= Map of Japan (Kanazawa Bunko) =

A map of Japan currently stored at Kanazawa Bunko depicts Japan and surrounding countries, both real and imaginary. The date of creation is unknown but probably falls within the Kamakura period. It is one of the oldest surviving Gyōki-type maps of Japan. It reveals Japan's self-image and the understanding of neighboring countries after the Mongol invasions of 1274 and 1281

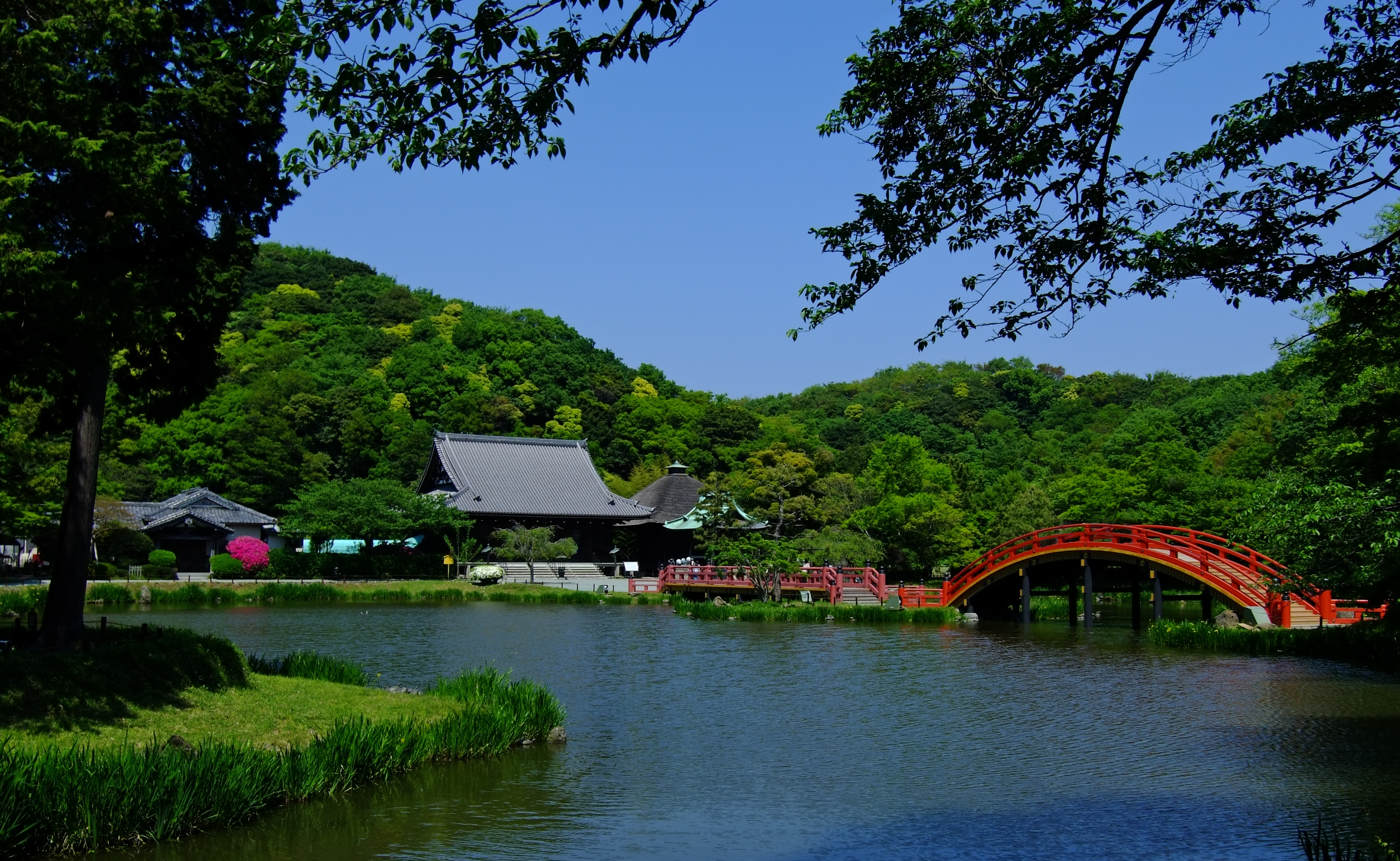
Shōmyōji, at Kanazawa-ku Yokohama Japan.

It is 34.2 cm by 51.8 cm. Only the western half of the map is extant. It is likely that the map was originally in possession of the medieval Kanazawa Bunko, which had been founded by the Kanesawa branch of the Hōjō clan, who was the de facto ruler of the Kamakura shogunate. After the downfall of the Kamakura shogunate, the holdings of Kanazawa Bunko were stored at the neighboring temple of Shōmyōji, which had also been established by the Kanesawa branch family. After the modern Kanazawa Bunko was established by Kanagawa Prefecture in 1930, the map among others were relocated. It was designated as an important cultural property in 1987.

== Contents and analysis ==
=== Japan ===
At the center Japan is illustrated as the shape of a one-pointed vajra, which symbolizes Japan's sacredness. A distinct feature of the map is that Japan is surrounded by the body of a serpent-like creature, which scholars identify as a dragon. The dragon seems to shield Japan from foreign enemies. For some reason, the provinces of Oki and Tsushima are put outside of the dragon.

Each province is labeled with its name, grade and the size of rice fields. The last field is rarely presented on other Gyōki-type maps. Also, the map lacks inter-provincial highways that are typical of Gyōki-type maps.

Scholars draw attention to the inclusion of small islands in northern Kyūshū, namely, Shikanoshima (シカノ島) and Takeshima (竹嶋). They were notable battlefields during the Mongol invasions of 1274 and 1281. For this reason, the map is considered to have created after the Mongol invasions of Japan.

=== South: Raksasas ===
The label on the land mass in the south reads: "Country of Raksasas: inhabited by women; people who visit never return" (羅刹國 女人萃来人不還). This imaginary entity has fascinated scholars. The textual references to the Raksasas or man-eating female demons can be found in the Konjaku Monogatarishū (12th century) and the Uji Shūi Monogatari (early 13th century) and can be traced back to the Chinese Great Tang Records on the Western Regions (646). These documents locate the country of Raksasas or Sōkara (Simhala) in the southern sea (of India). It is not clear why it was placed to the south of Japan, not India.

=== Southwest: Ryūkyū and Amami ===
In the southwestern corner, the label on the land mass reads: "Ushima, State of Ryūkyū] a human body and a bird head; Amami Island: a privately-owned district" (龍及國宇嶋身人頭鳥 雨見嶋私領郡). The latter half of the statement has been associated with the Kamakura shogunate's control over the southern borderland of Japan. Chikama Tokiie, who ruled a portion of Satsuma Province in southern Kyūshū, created a set of documents of inheritance in 1306. The properties to be inherited by Chikama Tokiie's family members included Kikai Island, Amami Ōshima and Tokunoshima (and probably Okinoerabu) of the Amami Islands. Scholars argue that since the Chikama clan was a retainer of the mainline Hōjō clan, its control over the Amami Islands was known to the creator of the map, an affiliate of the Hōjō clan.

Historian Kuroshima Satoru questions this dominant view, arguing that the Amami Islands are likely to have had a closer connection to Ōsumi Province than to Satsuma Province. He notes that Hōjō Tokinao of the Kanesawa branch of the Hōjō clan served as the military governor of Ōsumi Province in the early 14th century. The military governor of Ōsumi Province had a limited power because a large portion of the province was under the jurisdiction of the Shimazu Estate, which was then controlled by the rival Nagoe branch of the Hōjō clan. To consolidate power, Hōjō Tokinao incorporated the officials of the military government as his retainers and relabeled their lands as the "private terrotories of the military governor" (守護私領). The otherwise enigmatic phrase "privately-owned district" (私領郡) can be interpreted in this context.

The first half of the statement is more problematic. Scholars interpret Ushima (宇嶋) as a transcription of Ōshima (大嶋) or "Great Island". Standard Japanese Ō (< *opo) is pronounced Ufu or Huu in modern southern dialects although it is unlikely that the raising of /o/ to /u/ completed by the late Kamakura period. Although Ōshima usually refers to Amami Ōshima, the fact that the latter half of the statement covers the Amami Islands leads scholar to point to Okinawa Island as an alternative to Amami Ōshima. Ryūkyū as a land of demon-like people might reflect the traditional Japanese perception of Ryūkyū as a land of cannibals. Geographer Yoshinari and mythologist Fuku argue that a "bird head" might indicate a feather headdress worn by an Okinawan shaman.

=== West: China ===
China (唐土) is placed to the west of Japan. It is said to have consisted of 366 provinces. Even though the Chinese Song dynasty was conquered by the Mongol Empire in 1279, China is treated as a separate entity. This may help dating the map, or its source.

=== Northwest: Mongol Empire ===
A somewhat enigmatic label is attached to the northwestern land mass: "高麗ヨリ蒙古國之自日平トヨ國云唐土ヨリハ多々國々 一称八百國." Comparing this with other documents, scholars present the following interpretation: by Goryeo, [it is] called "Mongol State," "Toi State" by Japan and "Tatar State" by China, [and it consists of] 1,800 provinces. The Toi were Jurchen pirates who raided the coasts of Japan in the early 11th century, but were confused with the Mongols. The rare reference to the Mongol Empire on Japanese maps reflects the impact of the Mongol invasions. No label is attached to the land mass east of the Mongol Empire.

=== North: Gandō and Silla ===
The northern land mass has two set of labels. The first one is Gandō (geese route) and reads "there are castles but no people" (雖有城非人). This imaginary entity has puzzled scholars. The name of Gandō can only be found on medieval Gyōki-style maps. Some hypothesize that Gandō is parallel with Yanmen (geese gate), the northern border of China. Yanmen was well known in Japan through Chinese classics and would become the source of the imaginary entity in Japan's northern frontier.

The next label shows Silla of Korea even though it was replaced by Goryeo in 935. In medieval Japanese narratives, Silla was associated with Empress Jingū's conquest of the three Koreas. Thus Silla was seen as a foreign enemy to subjugate with the help of the divine power. The reference to Silla must be triggered by the contemporary threat of the Mongols.

== Relations to other maps ==
The map is often compared with a map of Japan stored at Ninnaji (1305), another oldest surviving Gyōki-type map (hereafter Ninnaji map). A notable difference is that the Ninnaji map lacks Raksasas and Gandō. They probably belong to different lines of cartographic tradition.

A sister map of Japan (hereafter Myōhonji map) was introduced to academic circles in 2001. It was stored at Myōhonji, a temple of the Nichiren Shōshū sect in Chiba Prefecture. It is accompanied by some documents, which enabled better understanding of Myōhonji map and the map concerned.

== Link ==
- (in Japanese) Important Cultural Property registration
