= Satsuma-Shioya Station =

Railway station in Minamikyūshū, Kagoshima Prefecture, Japan

Satsuma-Shioya Station 薩摩塩屋駅
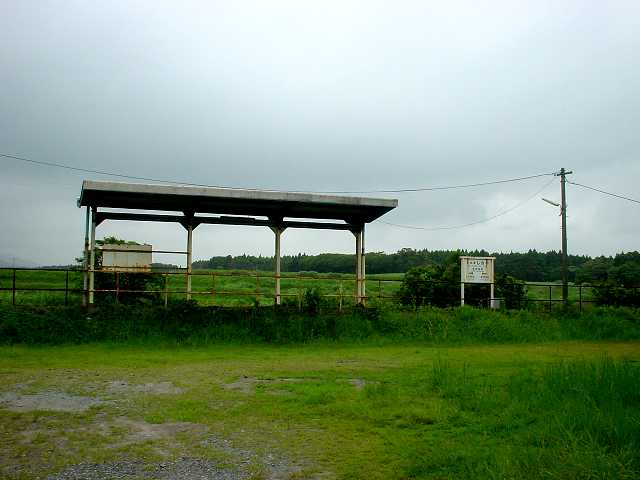
- Satsuma-Shioya Station

General information
- Location: Chiranchō Shioya, Minamikyūshū-shi, Kagoshima-ken 891-0911; Japan
- Coordinates: 31°15′25″N 130°22′34″E
- Operator: JR Kyushu
- Line: ■ Ibusuki Makurazaki Line
- Distance: 79.9 km from Kagoshima-Chūō
- Platforms: 1 side platform

Other information
- Status: Unstaffed
- Website: Official website

History
- Opened: 31 October 1963

Passengers
- FY2015: 0.1 daily

Services
Preceding station	JR Kyushu	Following station
Matsugaura towards Kagoshima-Chūō	Ibusuki Makurazaki Line	Shirasawa towards Makurazaki
Location
- Location within Kagoshima Prefecture Location within Japan

Satsuma-Shioya Station (薩摩塩屋駅, Satsuma-Shioya-eki) is a passenger railway station located in the city of Minamikyūshū, Kagoshima Prefecture, Japan. It is operated by JR Kyushu.

== Lines ==
The station is served by the Ibusuki Makurazaki Line and is located 79.9 km from the starting point of the line at Kagoshima-Chūō.

== Layout ==
This is an above-ground station with one side platform and one track. It is an unattended station. There is no station building. It was previously an interchange station with one island platform and two tracks. Traces of this can still be seen in the wiring and now deadheaded second track used as a siding for storing maintenance machinery.

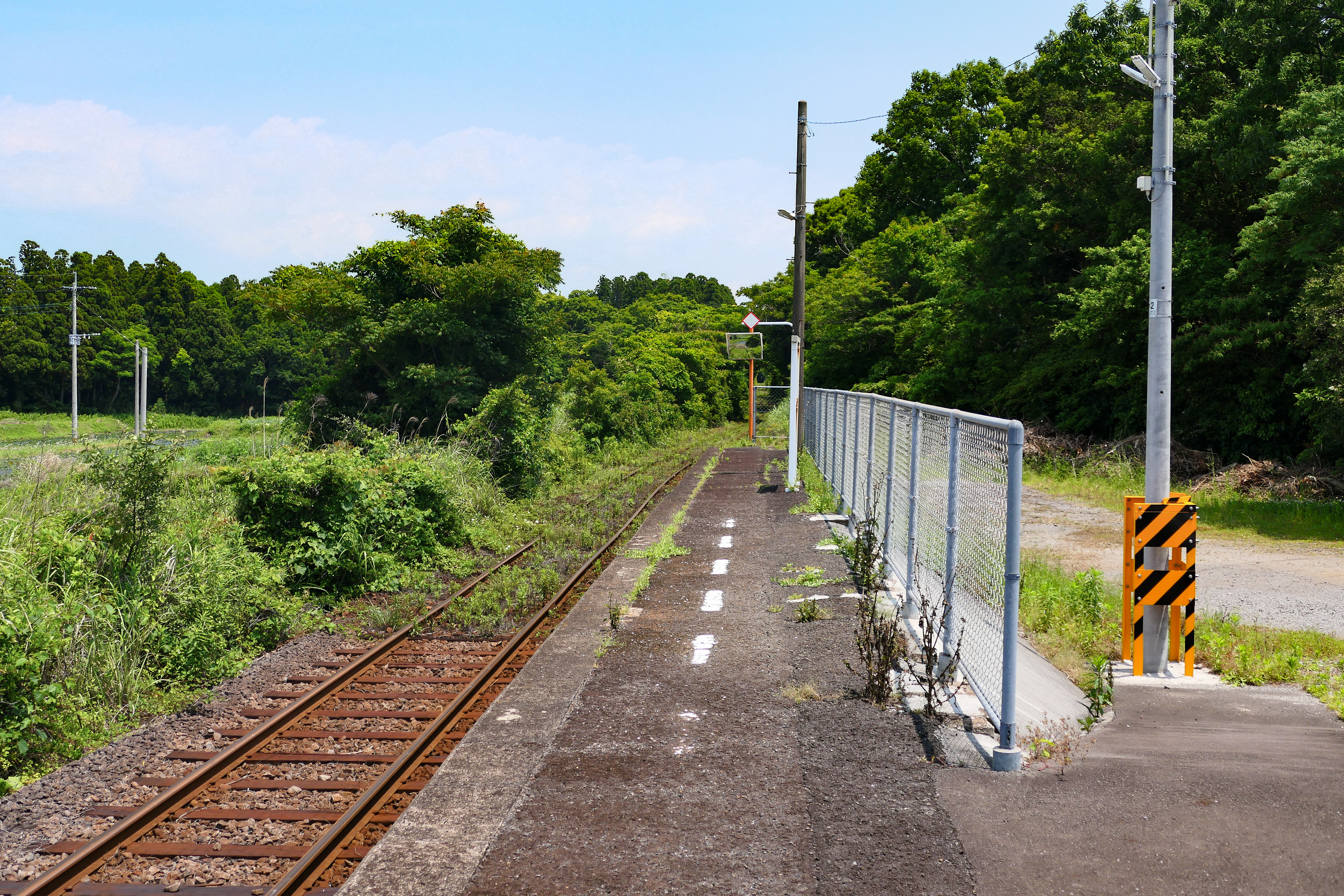
Platform

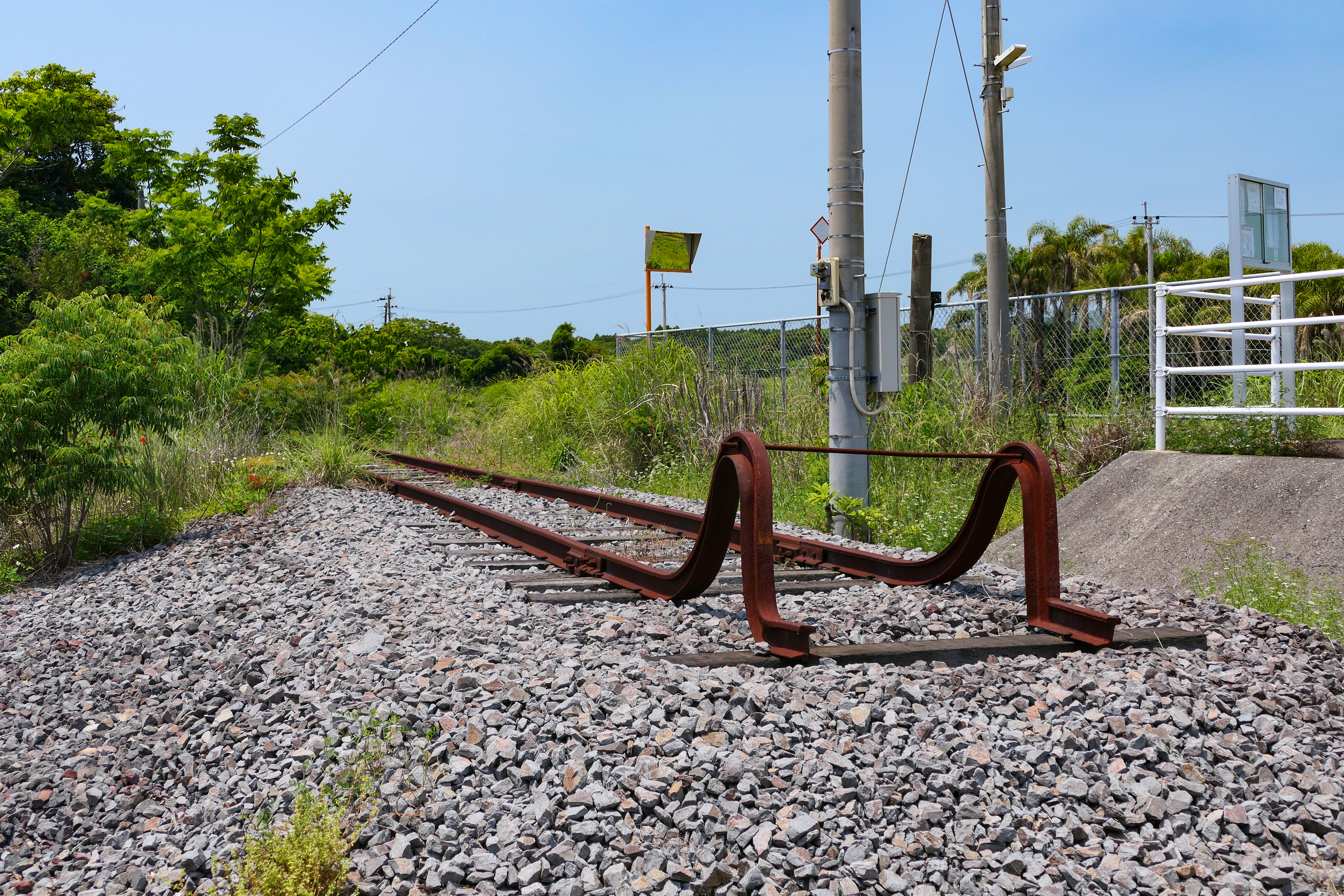
siding

== History ==
The station was opened on 31 October 1963 as a station on the JNR Ibusuki Line, when the line was extended from Saijo Station to Makurazaki Station to become the Ibusuki Makurazaki Line. On this day, Ishigaki Station, Suisegawa Station, Sagaokawa Station, Matsugaura Station, Goryō Station, Shirasawa Station, Satsuma Itashiki Station, and Makurazaki Station were also opened. With the privatization of Japanese National Railways (JNR), the successor of JGR, on 1 April 1987, JR Kyushu took over control of the station.

== Passenger statistics ==
In fiscal 2015, the station was used by an average of 0.1 passengers daily.

== Surrounding area ==
- Japan National Route 226

== See also ==
- List of railway stations in Japan
