= Ei Station =

Railway station in Minamikyūshū, Kagoshima Prefecture, Japan

Ei Station 頴娃駅
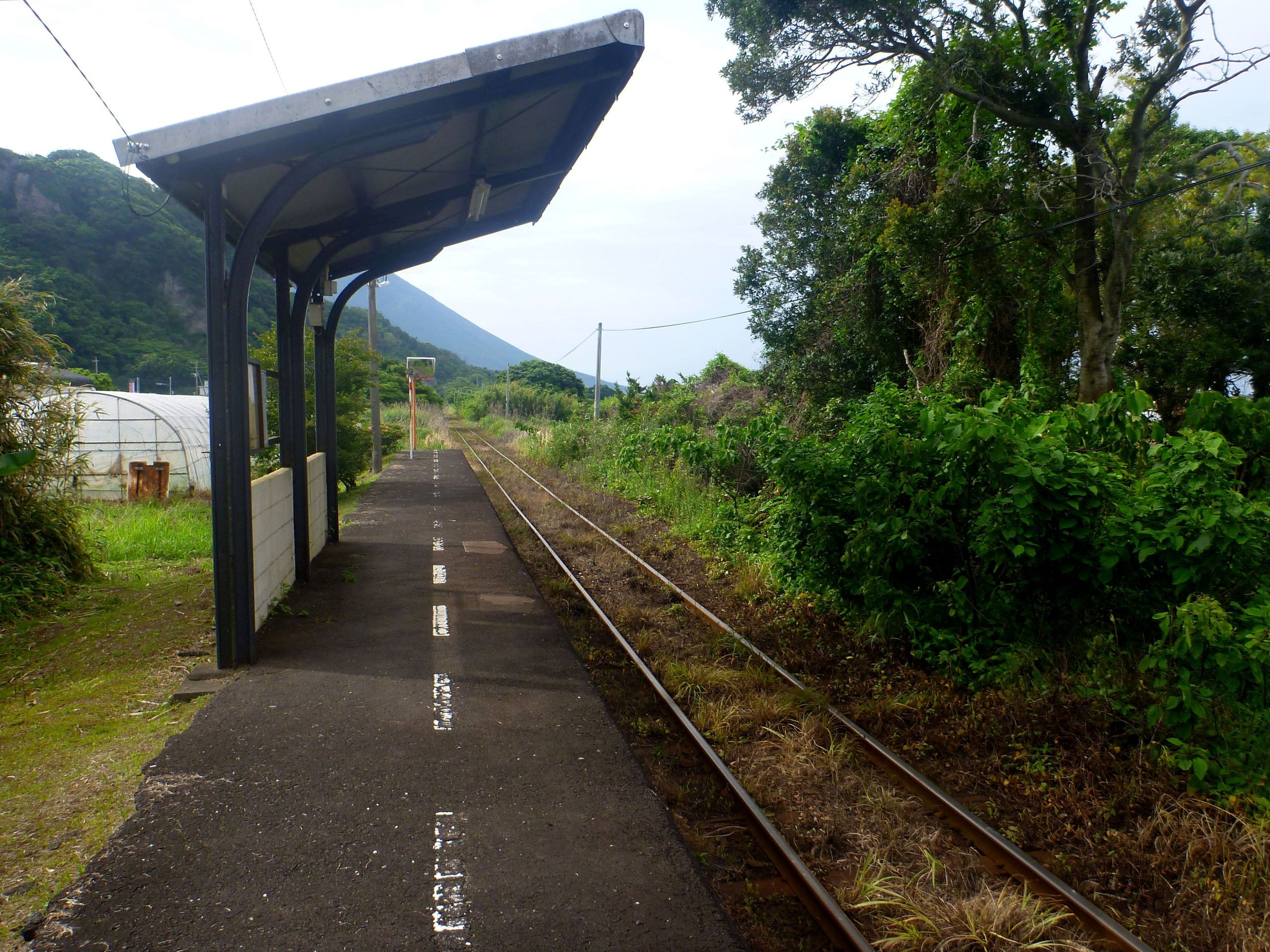
- Ei Station in 2018

General information
- Location: Eichōkōri, Minamikyūshū-shi, Kagoshima-ken 891-0701; Japan
- Coordinates: 31°13′45″N 130°30′1″E
- Operator: JR Kyushu
- Line: ■ Ibusuki Makurazaki Line
- Distance: 66.1 km from Kagoshima-Chūō
- Platforms: 1 side platform

Other information
- Status: Unstaffed
- Website: Official website

History
- Opened: 23 March 1960

Passengers
- FY2015: 4 daily

Services
| Preceding station | JR Kyushu | Following station |
|---|---|---|
| Irino towards Kagoshima-Chūō | Ibusuki Makurazaki Line | Nishi-Ei towards Makurazaki |
Location
- Location within Kagoshima Prefecture Location within Japan

Ei Station (頴娃駅, Ei-eki) is a passenger railway station located in the city of Minamikyūshū, Kagoshima Prefecture, Japan. It is operated by JR Kyushu.

== Lines ==
The station is served by the Ibusuki Makurazaki Line and is located 66.1 km from the starting point of the line at Kagoshima-Chūō.

== Layout ==
This is an above-ground station with one side platform and one track. It is an unattended station. There was a station building when it was a staffed station, but it has been demolished, leaving only the exposed platform and a short open shelter.

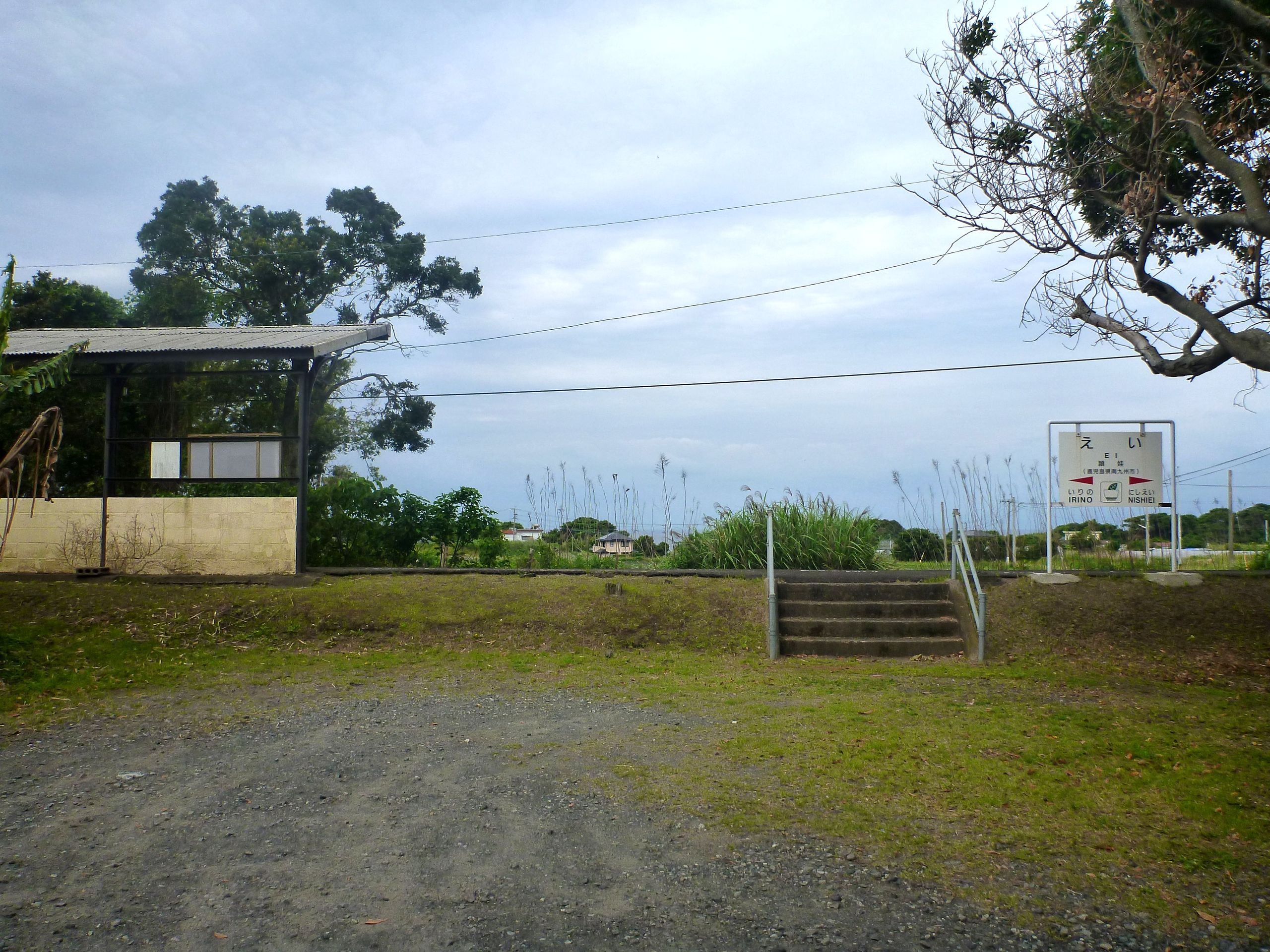
Front view of statin

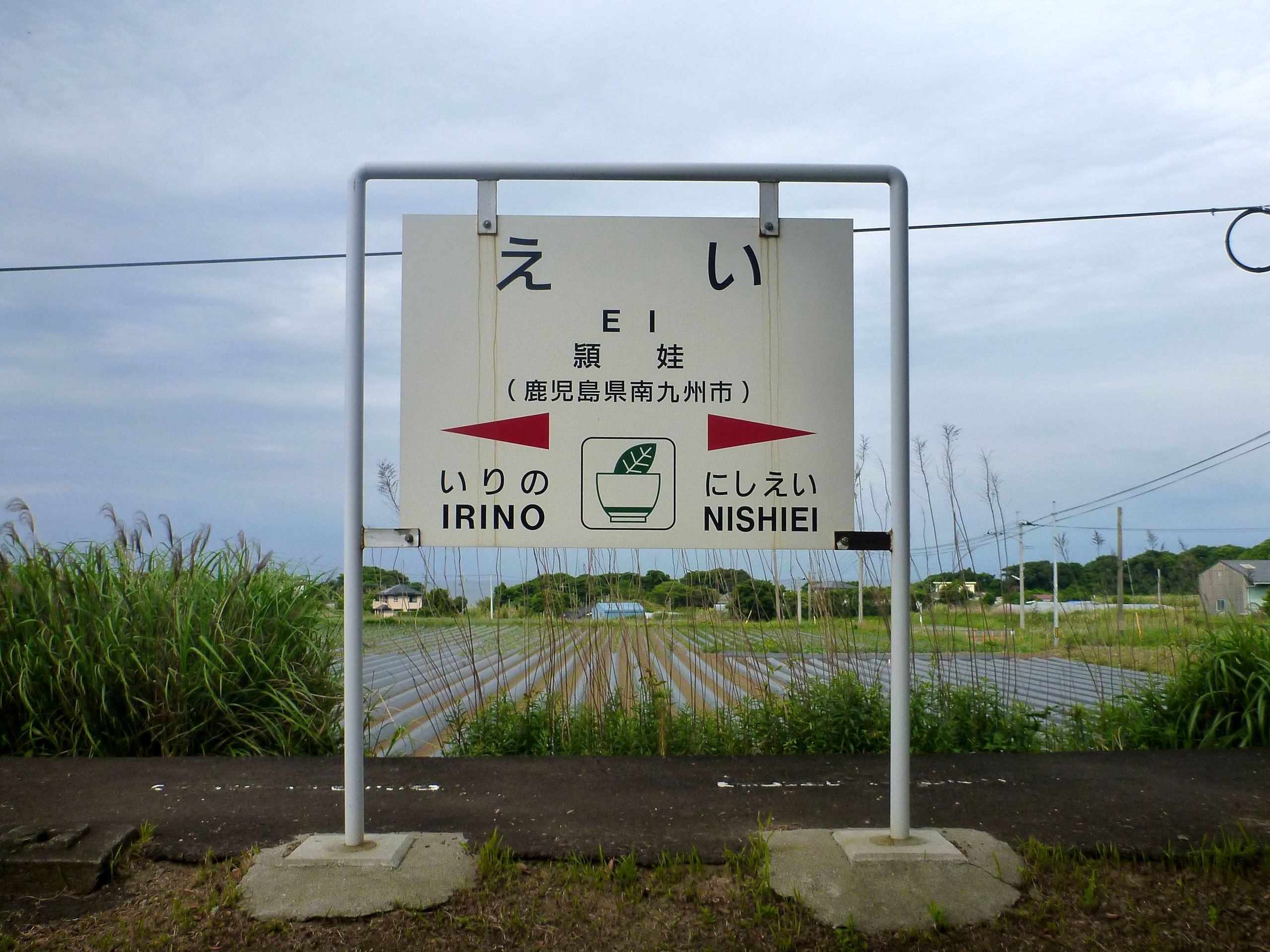
station signage

== History ==
The station was opened on 23 March 1960 as a station on the JNR Ibusuki Line. With the privatization of Japanese National Railways (JNR), the successor of JGR, on 1 April 1987, JR Kyushu took over control of the station.

== Passenger statistics ==
In fiscal 2015, the station was used by an average of 4 passengers daily.

== Surrounding area ==
- Minamikyushu Municipal Eiwa Elementary School
- Japan National Route 226

== See also ==
- List of railway stations in Japan
