= Matsugaura Station =

Railway station in Minamikyūshū, Kagoshima Prefecture, Japan

Matsugaura Station 松ヶ浦駅
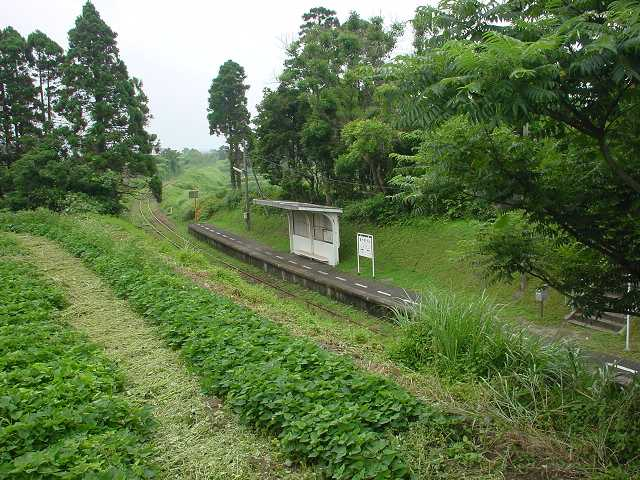
- Matsugaura Station, Japan

General information
- Location: Chiranchō Minamibeppu,, Minamikyūshū-shi, Kagoshima-ken 891-0912; Japan
- Coordinates: 31°15′32″N 130°23′40″E
- Operator: JR Kyushu
- Line: ■ Ibusuki Makurazaki Line
- Distance: 78.1 km from Kagoshima-Chūō
- Platforms: 1 side platform

Other information
- Status: Unstaffed
- Website: Official website

History
- Opened: 31 October 1963

Passengers
- FY2015: 0.4 daily

Services
Preceding station	JR Kyushu	Following station
Ei-Ōkawa towards Kagoshima-Chūō	Ibusuki Makurazaki Line	Satsuma-Shioya towards Makurazaki
Location
- Location within Kagoshima Prefecture Location within Japan

Matsugaura Station (御領駅, Matsugaura-eki) is a passenger railway station located in the city of Minamikyūshū, Kagoshima Prefecture, Japan. It is operated by JR Kyushu.

== Lines ==
The station is served by the Ibusuki Makurazaki Line and is located 78.1 km from the starting point of the line at Kagoshima-Chūō.

== Layout ==
This is an above-ground station with one side platform and one track. It is an unattended station. There is no station building.

== History ==
The station was opened on 31 October 1963 as a station on the JNR Ibusuki Line, when the line was extended from Saijo Station to Makurazaki Station to become the Ibusuki Makurazaki Line. On this day, Ishigaki Station, Suisegawa Station, Sagaokawa Station, Goryō Station, Satsuma Shioya Station, Shirasawa Station, Satsuma Itashiki Station, and Makurazaki Station were also opened. With the privatization of Japanese National Railways (JNR), the successor of JGR, on 1 April 1987, JR Kyushu took over control of the station.

== Passenger statistics ==
In fiscal 2015, the station was used by an average of 0.4 passengers daily.

Ridership remains minimal due to the area's rural nature, rising car ownership, and an aging population, reducing reliance on local rail infrastructure.

== Surrounding area ==
- Japan National Route 226

== See also ==
- List of railway stations in Japan
