= Yamakawa Station =

Railway station in Ibusuki, Kagoshima Prefecture, Japan

Yamakawa Station 山川駅
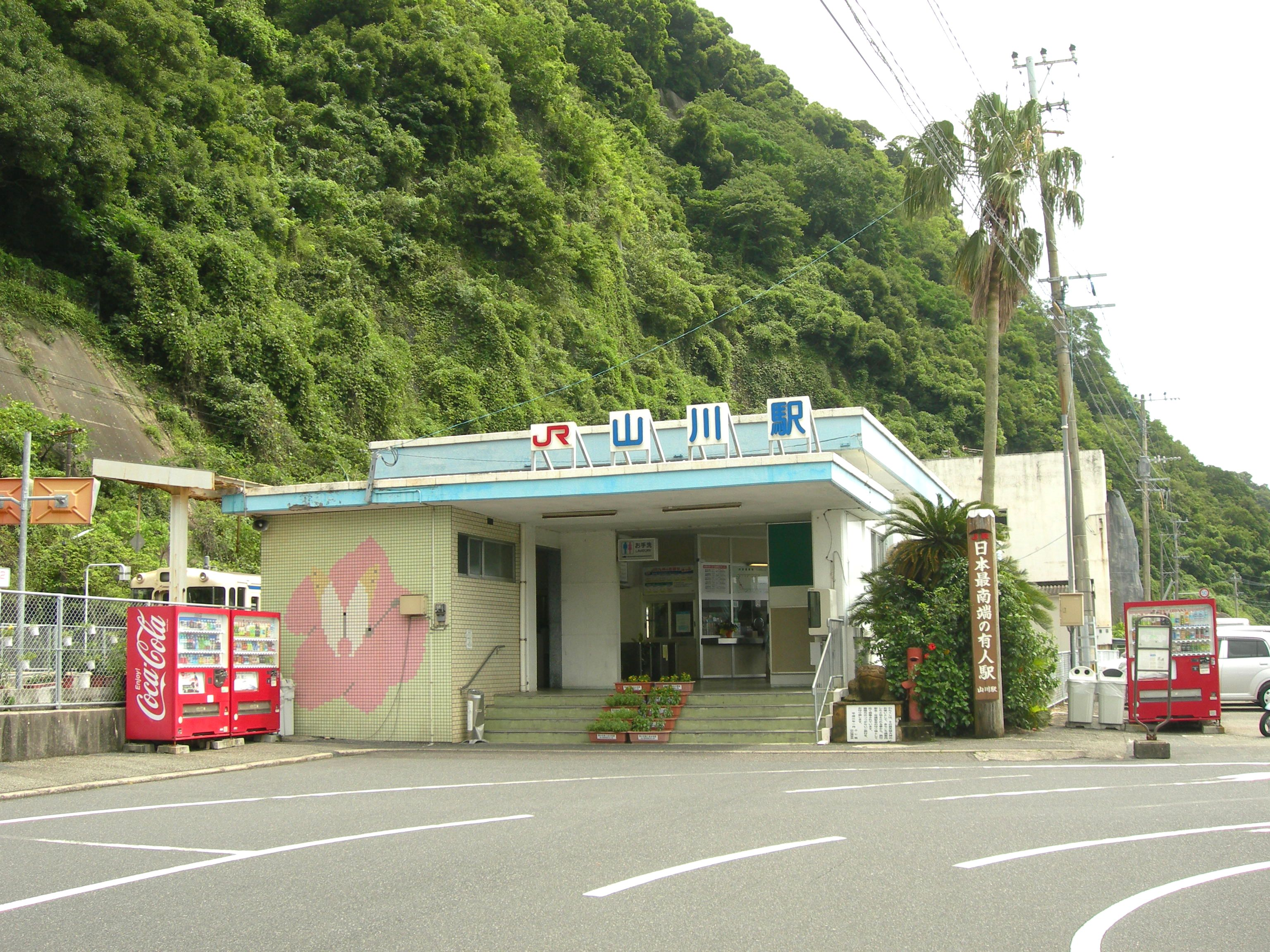
- Yamakawa Station

General information
- Location: Yamakawa Narikawa, Ibusuki-shi, Kagoshima-ken 891-0516; Japan
- Coordinates: 31°12′41″N 130°37′47″E
- Operator: JR Kyushu
- Line: ■ Ibusuki Makurazaki Line
- Distance: 50.0 km from Kagoshima-Chūō
- Platforms: 1 side platform

Other information
- Status: Staffed
- Website: Official website

History
- Opened: 25 March 1936

Passengers
- FY2015: 188 daily

Services
Preceding station	JR Kyushu	Following station
Ibusuki towards Kagoshima-Chūō	Ibusuki Makurazaki Line	Ōyama towards Makurazaki
Location
- Location within Kagoshima Prefecture Location within Japan

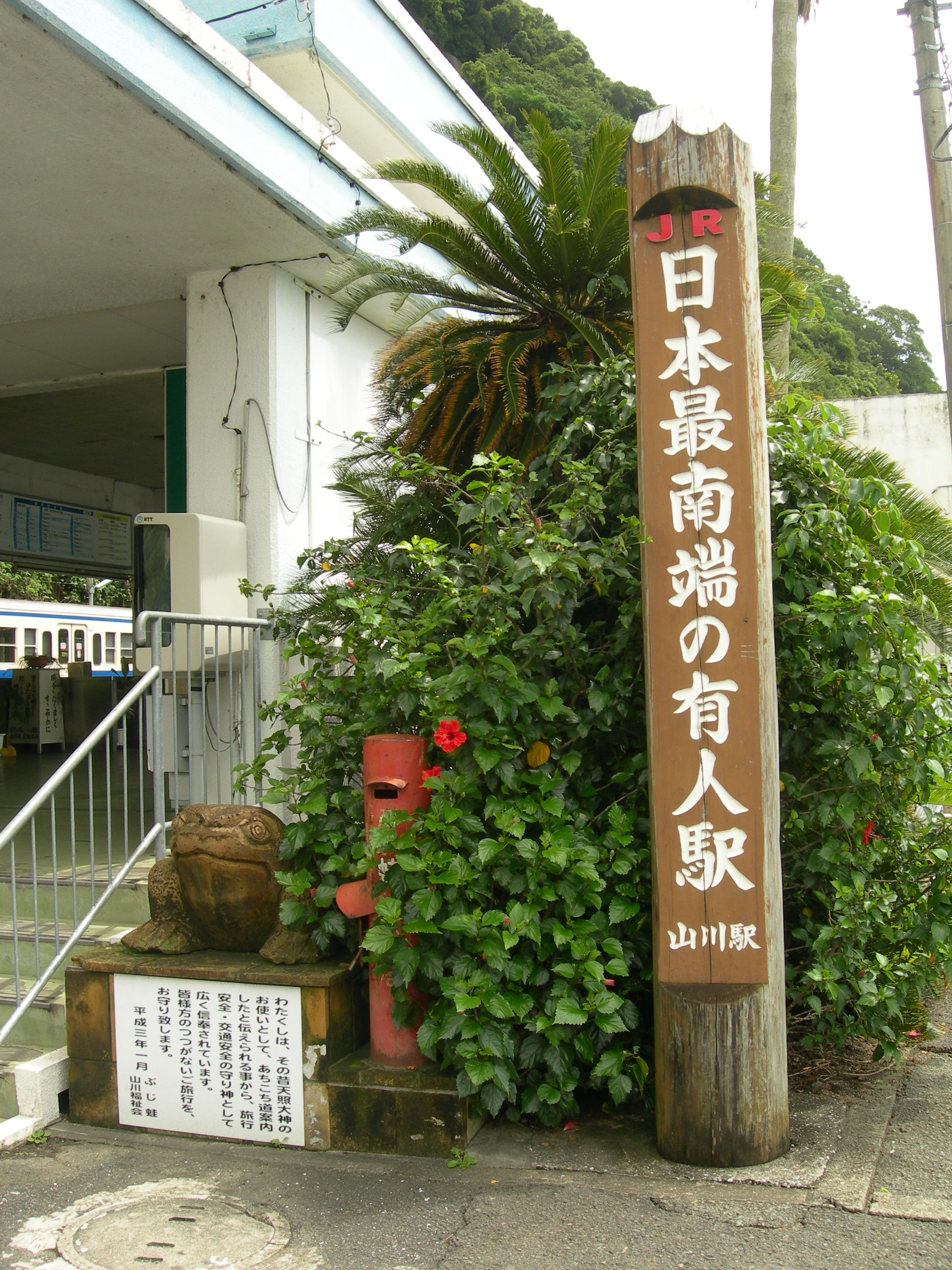
The post says the southernmost (conventional) staffed railway station in Japan.

Yamakawa Station (山川駅, Yamakawa-eki) is a passenger railway station located in the city of Ibusuki, Kagoshima Prefecture, Japan. It is operated by JR Kyushu. A monument at the station proclaims it to be the southernmost conventional staffed railway station in Japan.

== Lines ==
The station is served by the Ibusuki Makurazaki Line and is located 50.0 km from the starting point of the line at Kagoshima-Chūō.

== Layout ==
It is an above-ground station with two opposing side platforms and two tracks. The two platforms are connected by a level crossing. Platform 1 and Platform 2 are the same for each direction, but Platform 1 is longer, with Platform 1 (station side) for five cars and Platform 2 for three cars. Platform 1 is mainly used, and Platform 2 is used when Platform 1 is not available due to train switching or other reasons. On the side of Platform 1 near Ibusuki Station, there are remains of the freight loading and unloading platform, transportation passageway, and staff room that were used until the time when freight services were available up to this station.

=== Platforms ===
1	■ ■ Ibusuki Makurazaki Line	for Nishi-Ei and Makurazaki
2	■ ■ Ibusuki Makurazaki Line	for Kagoshima-Chūō

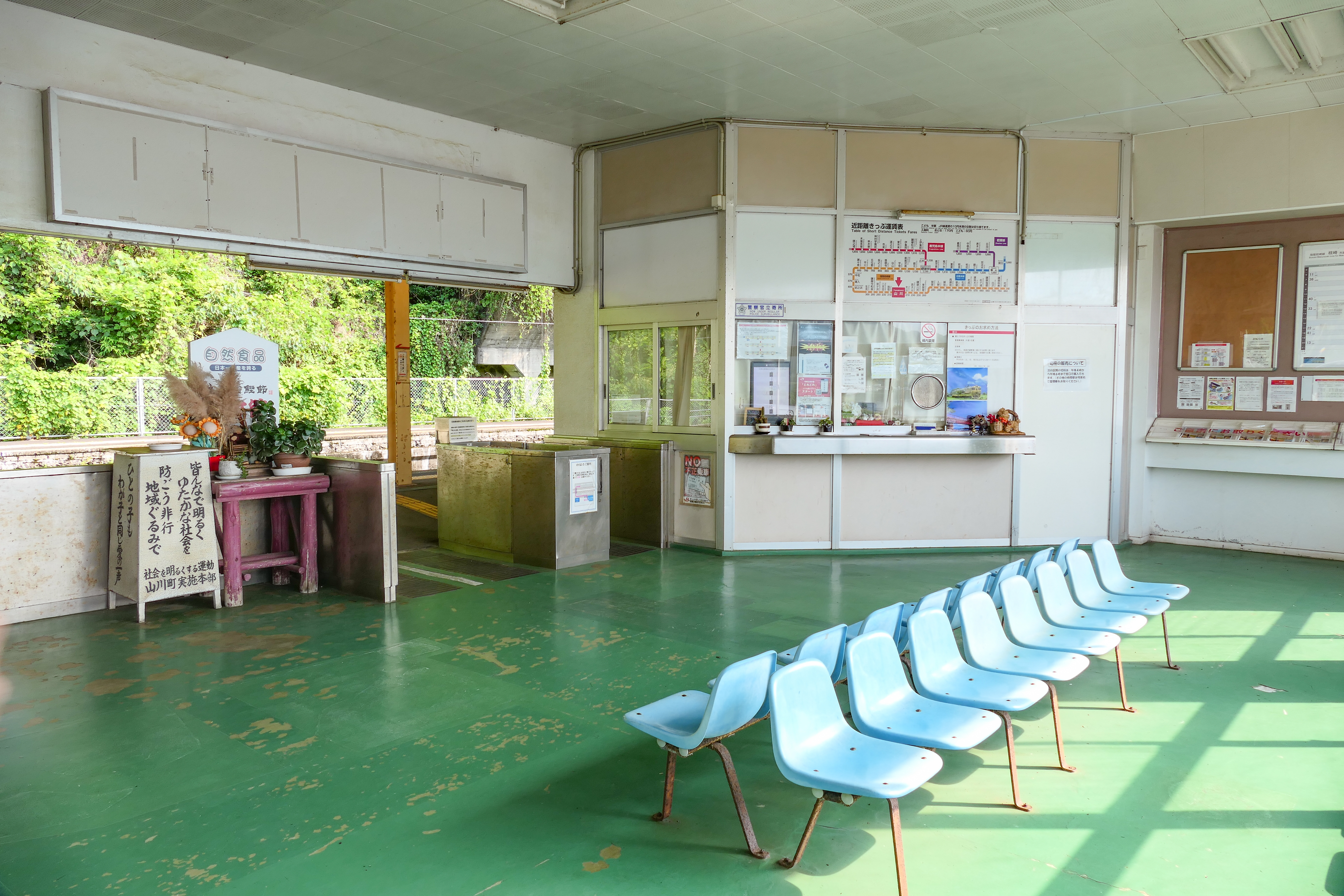
Ticket gates and waiting room

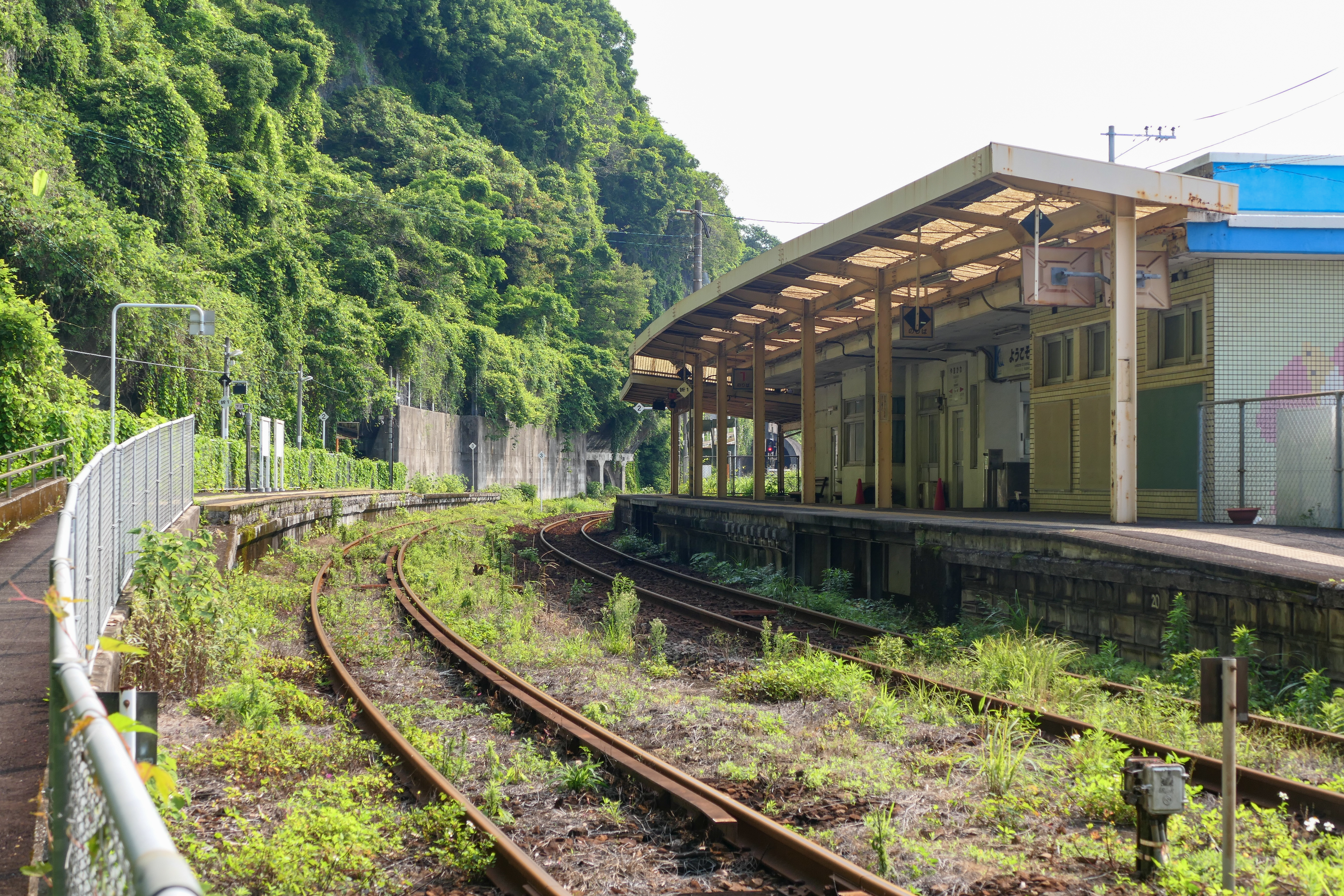
Platform

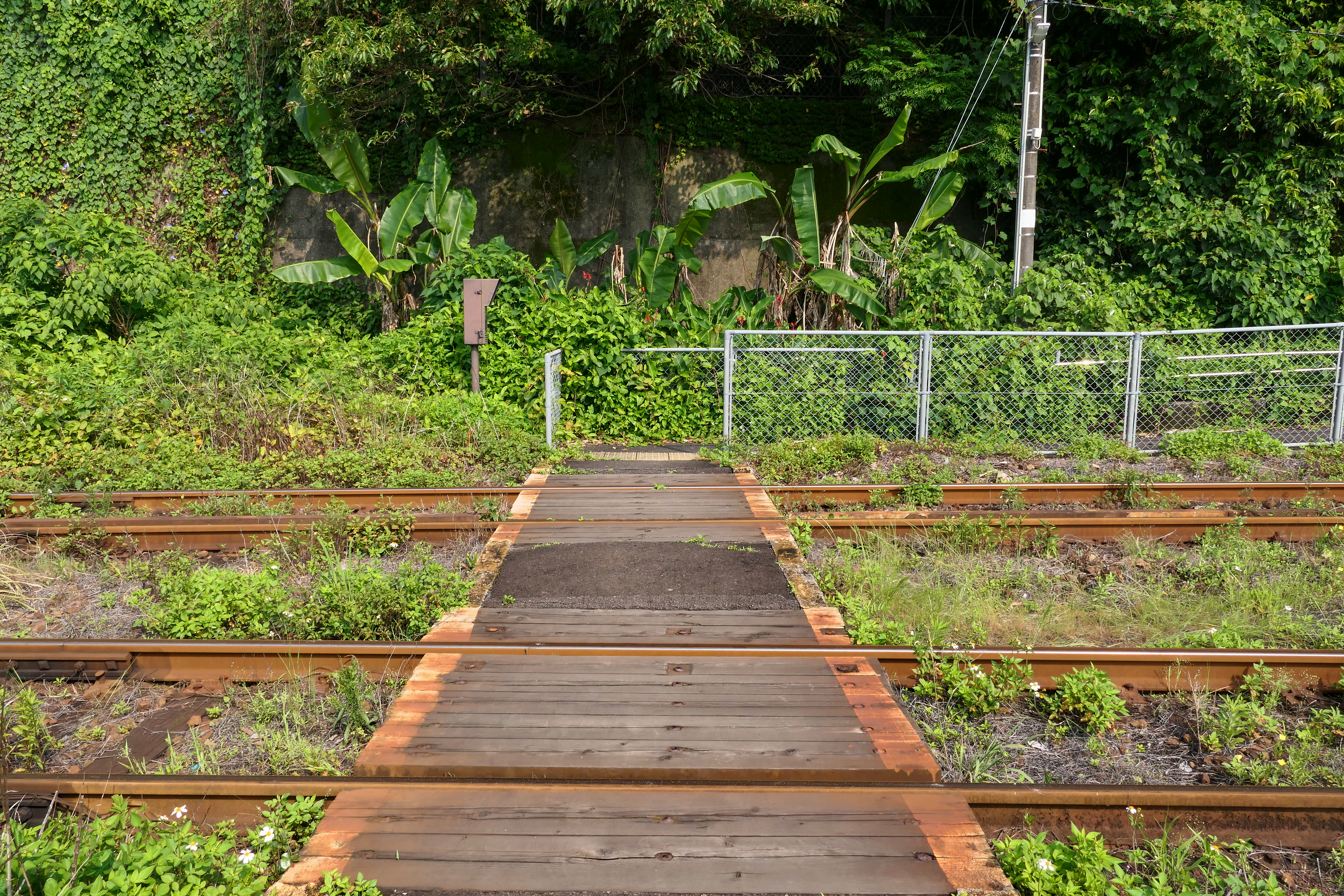
Level Crossing

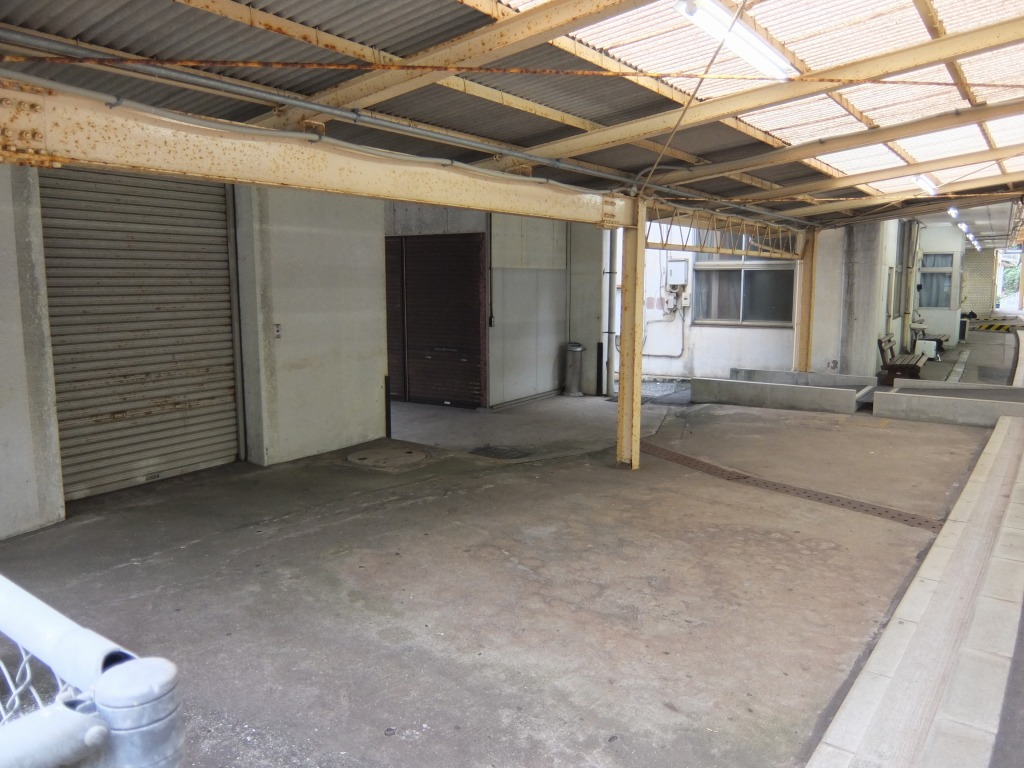
remnants of freight platform

== History ==
The station was opened on 25 March 1936 by the Japanese Government Railways (JGR) to coincide with the opening of service from Ibusuki. The original station building was destroyed by an air raid on 29 March 1945. The line was extended on 22 March 1960 to Nishi-Ei, and to Makurazaki on 31 October 1961 with the name of the line is changed to the Ibusuki Makurazaki Line. With the privatization of Japanese National Railways (JNR), the successor of JGR, on 1 April 1987, JR Kyushu took over control of the station.

== Passenger statistics ==
In fiscal 2015, the station was used by an average of 13 passengers daily.

== Surrounding area ==
- Japan National Route 269
- Yamakawa Bay

== See also ==
- List of railway stations in Japan
