= Nishi-Ei Station =

Railway station in Minamikyūshū, Kagoshima Prefecture, Japan

Nishi-Ei Station 西頴娃駅
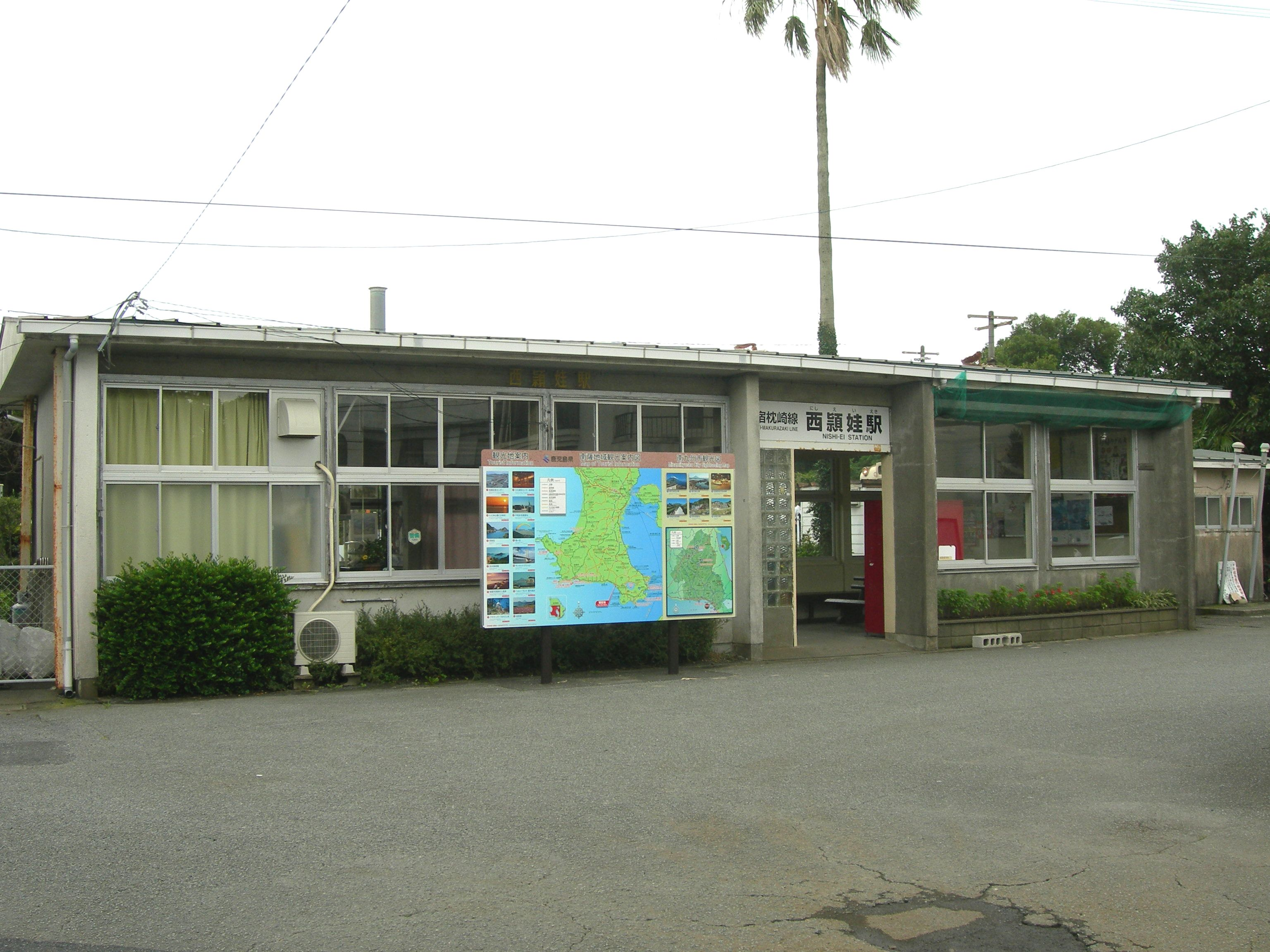
- Nishi-Ei Station in 2010

General information
- Location: Eichōkōri, Minamikyūshū-shi, Kagoshima-ken 891-0702; Japan
- Coordinates: 31°14′28″N 130°29′31″E
- Operator: JR Kyushu
- Line: ■ Ibusuki Makurazaki Line
- Distance: 67.7 km from Kagoshima-Chūō
- Platforms: 1 island platform

Other information
- Status: Staffed
- Website: Official website

History
- Opened: 22 March 1960

Passengers
- FY2015: 76 daily

Services
Preceding station	JR Kyushu	Following station
Ei towards Kagoshima-Chūō	Ibusuki Makurazaki Line	Goryō towards Makurazaki
Location
- Location within Kagoshima Prefecture Location within Japan

Nishi-Ei Station (西頴娃駅, Nishi-Ei-eki) is a passenger railway station located in the city of Minamikyūshū, Kagoshima Prefecture, Japan. It is operated by JR Kyushu.

== Lines ==
The station is served by the Ibusuki Makurazaki Line and is located 67.7 km from the starting point of the line at Kagoshima-Chūō.

== Layout ==
This above-ground station has one island platform and two tracks, and is capable of switching and turning around trains. A level crossing (without barriers) connects the platform to the station building. Platform 1 is on the station building side. The station has a small concrete station building. This station and Makurazaki Station are the only stations that still have station buildings beyond Yamakawa Station. The station sign has been updated to a unique design, featuring Mount Kaimon and the monster Issie swimming in Lake Ikeda.

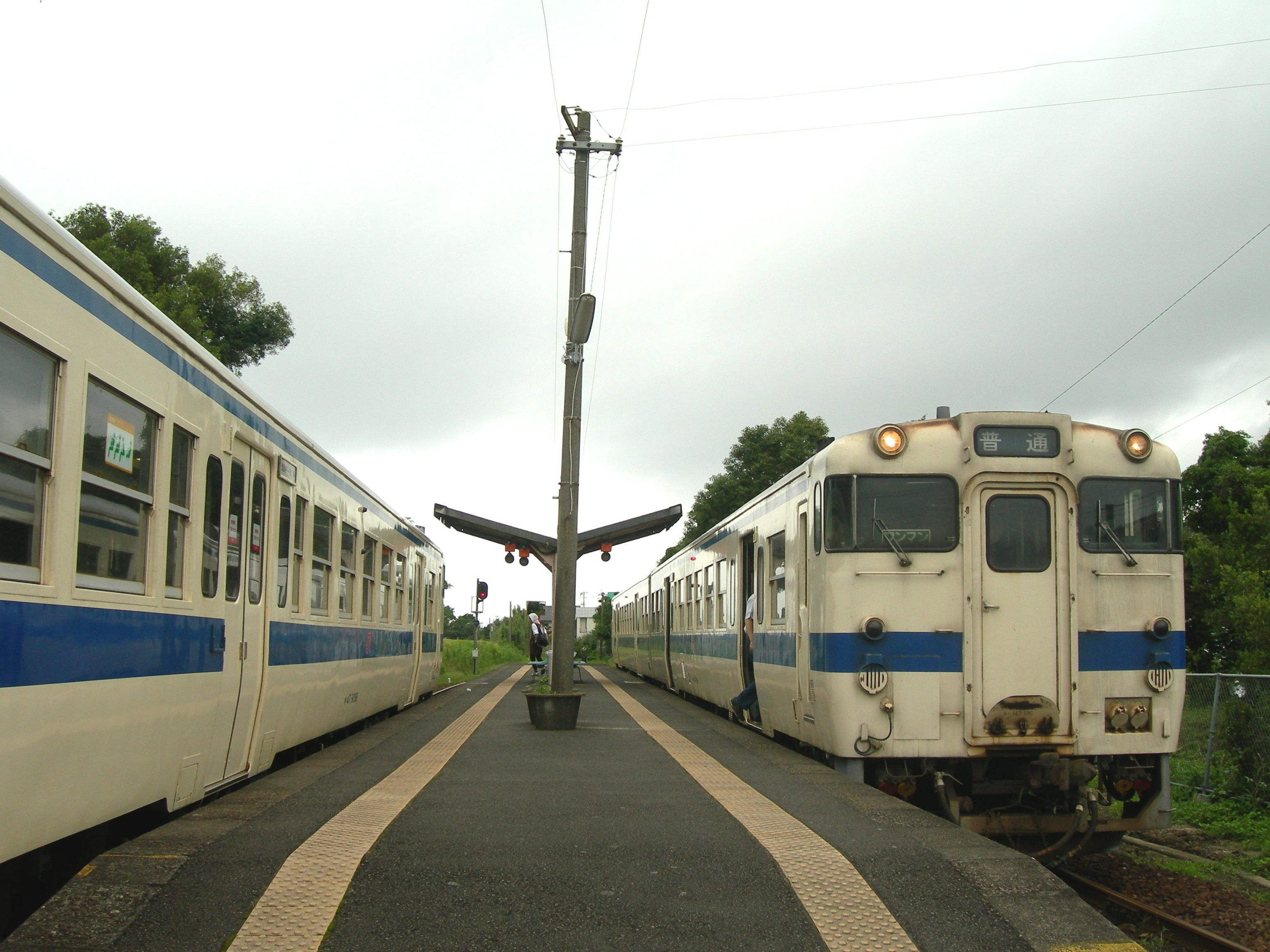
Platform

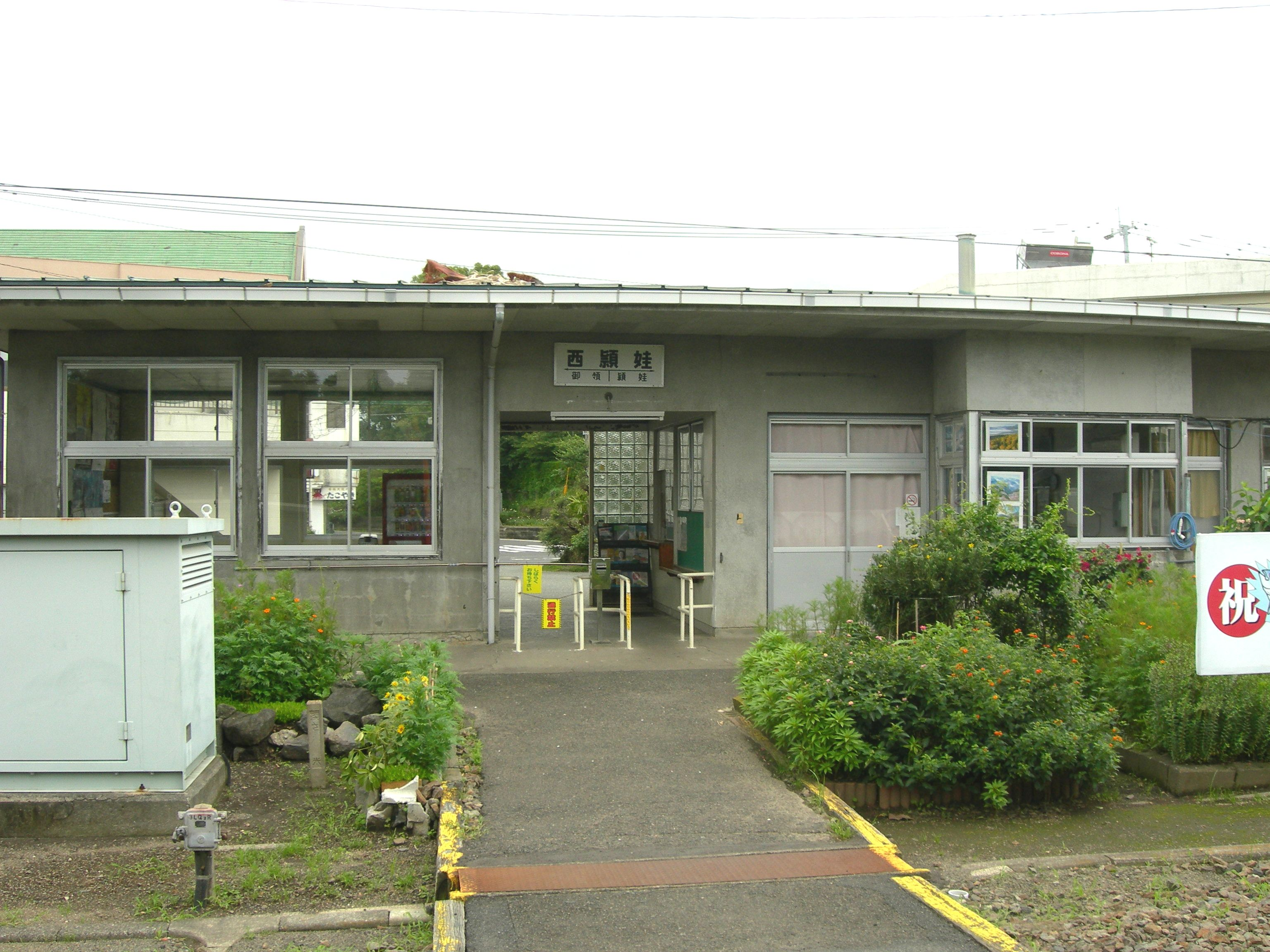
Waiting Room

== History ==
The station was opened on 22 March 1960 as a station on the JNR Ibusuki Line. With the privatization of Japanese National Railways (JNR), the successor of JGR, on 1 April 1987, JR Kyushu took over control of the station.

== Passenger statistics ==
In fiscal 2015, the station was used by an average of 76 passengers daily.

== Surrounding area ==
- Minamikyushu City Hall Eiwa Branch (formerly Eiwa Town Hall)
- Kagoshima Prefectural Eiwa High School
- Minamikyushu City Eiwa Junior High School

== See also ==
- List of railway stations in Japan
