= Izu-Ōkawa Station =

Railway station in Higashiizu, Shizuoka Prefecture, Japan

Izu Ōkawa Station 伊豆大川駅
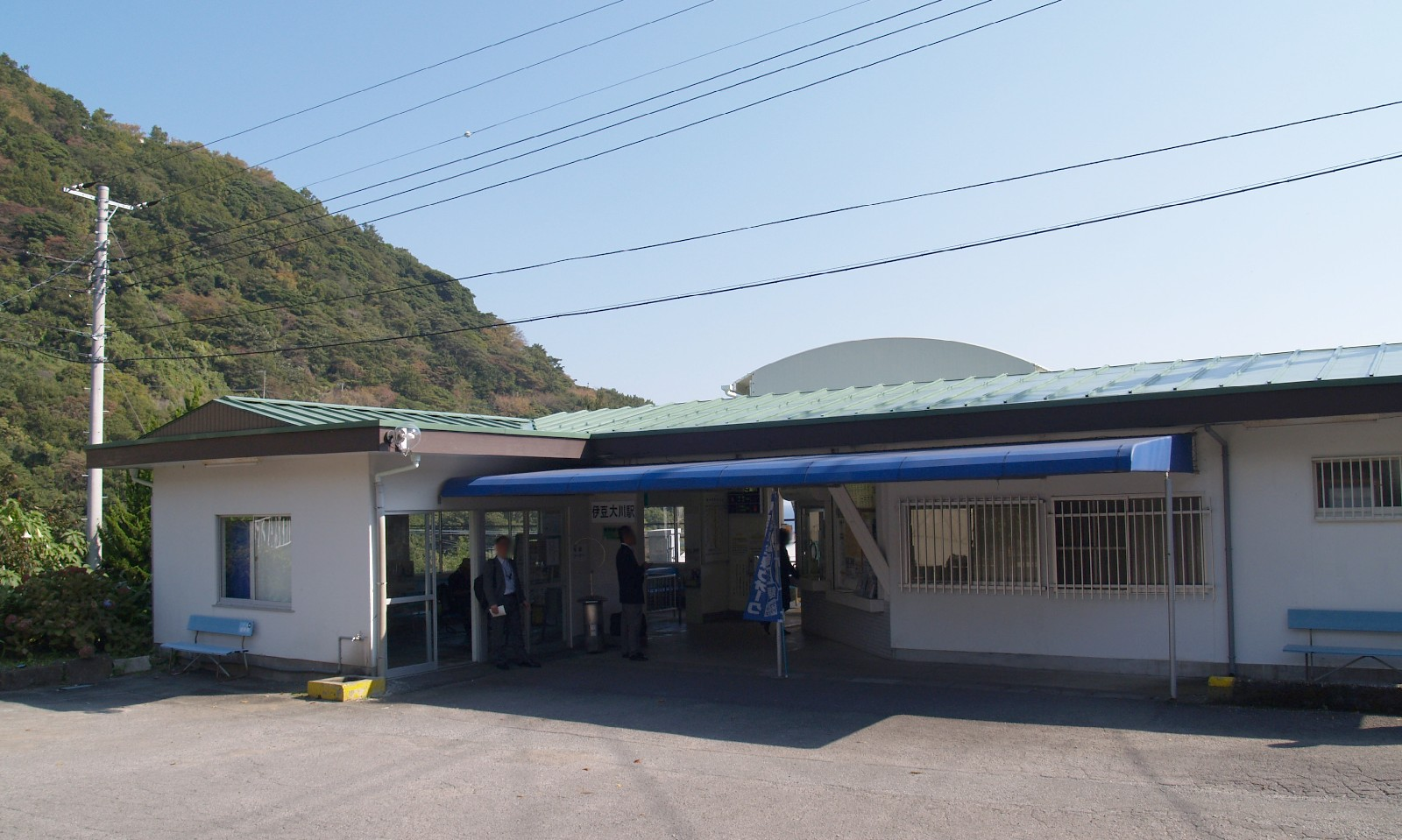
- Exterior of Izu-Ōkawa Station in November 2008

General information
- Location: Ōkawa Aza Kawaharada, Higashiizu-cho, Kamo-gun, Shizuoka-ken 413-0301; Japan
- Coordinates: 34°50′38″N 139°4′26″E
- Operator: Izukyū Corporation
- Line: ■ Izu Kyūkō Line
- Distance: 20.9 kilometers from Itō
- Platforms: 2 side platforms

Other information
- Status: Unstaffed
- Station code: IZ07

History
- Opened: December 10, 1961

Passengers
- FY2017: 136 daily
Location
- Location within Shizuoka Prefecture Location within Japan

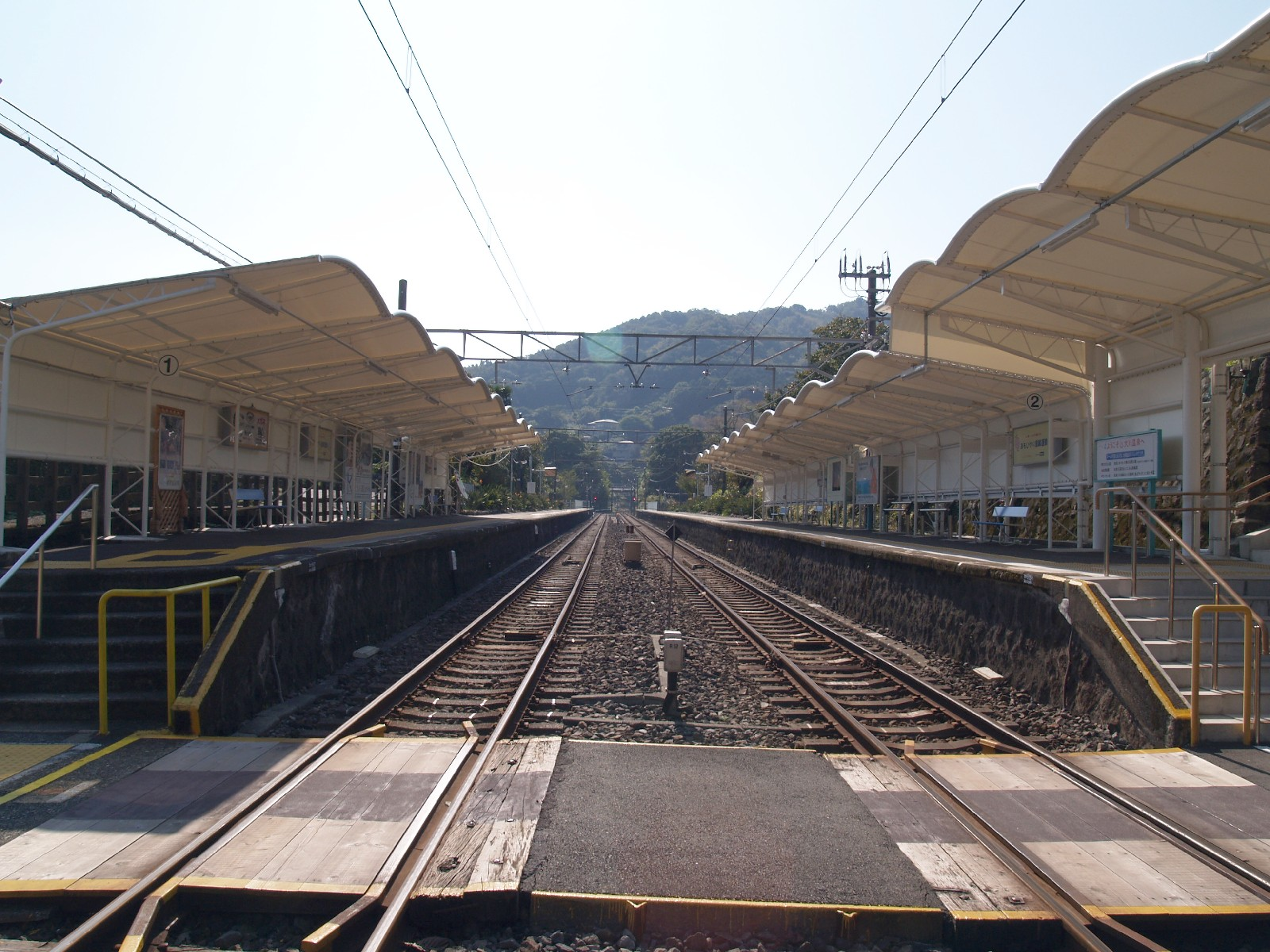
Platforms

Izu-Ōkawa Station (伊豆大川駅, Izu-Ōkawa-eki) is a railway station in the town of Higashiizu, Shizuoka Prefecture, Japan, operated by the privately owned Izu Kyūkō Line .

== Lines ==
Izu-Ōkawa Station is served by the Izu Kyūkō Line, and is located 20.9 kilometers from the official starting point of the line at Itō and is 37.8 kilometers from Atami.

== Station layout ==
Izu-Ōkawa Station has two opposing side platforms serving two tracks connected by a level crossing. Track 2 is used for trains in both directions, and is the track in normal use. Track 1 is used at times to permit the passage of an express train, as the station does not have a headshunt. The station is unattended.

=== Platforms ===
1	■ Izu Kyūkō Line	Izu-Atagawa ・ Izu-Inatori ・ Kawazu ・ Izukyū Shimoda
2	■ Izu Kyūkō Line	Itō ・ Izu-Kōgen ・ Atami

== Adjacent stations ==
«	Service	»
Izu Kyūkō Line
Izu-Kōgen	Local	Izu-Hokkawa

== History ==
Izu-Ōkawa Station was opened on December 10, 1961. The station is located next to Ōkawa hot springs, and there is a foot bath on the grounds of the station.

== Passenger statistics ==
In fiscal 2017, the station was used by an average of 136 passengers daily (boarding passengers only).

== Surrounding area ==
- Ōkawa Onsen

== See also ==
- List of railway stations in Japan
