= Japan National Route 225 =

Road in Kagoshima prefecture, Japan

National Route 225
- 国道225号
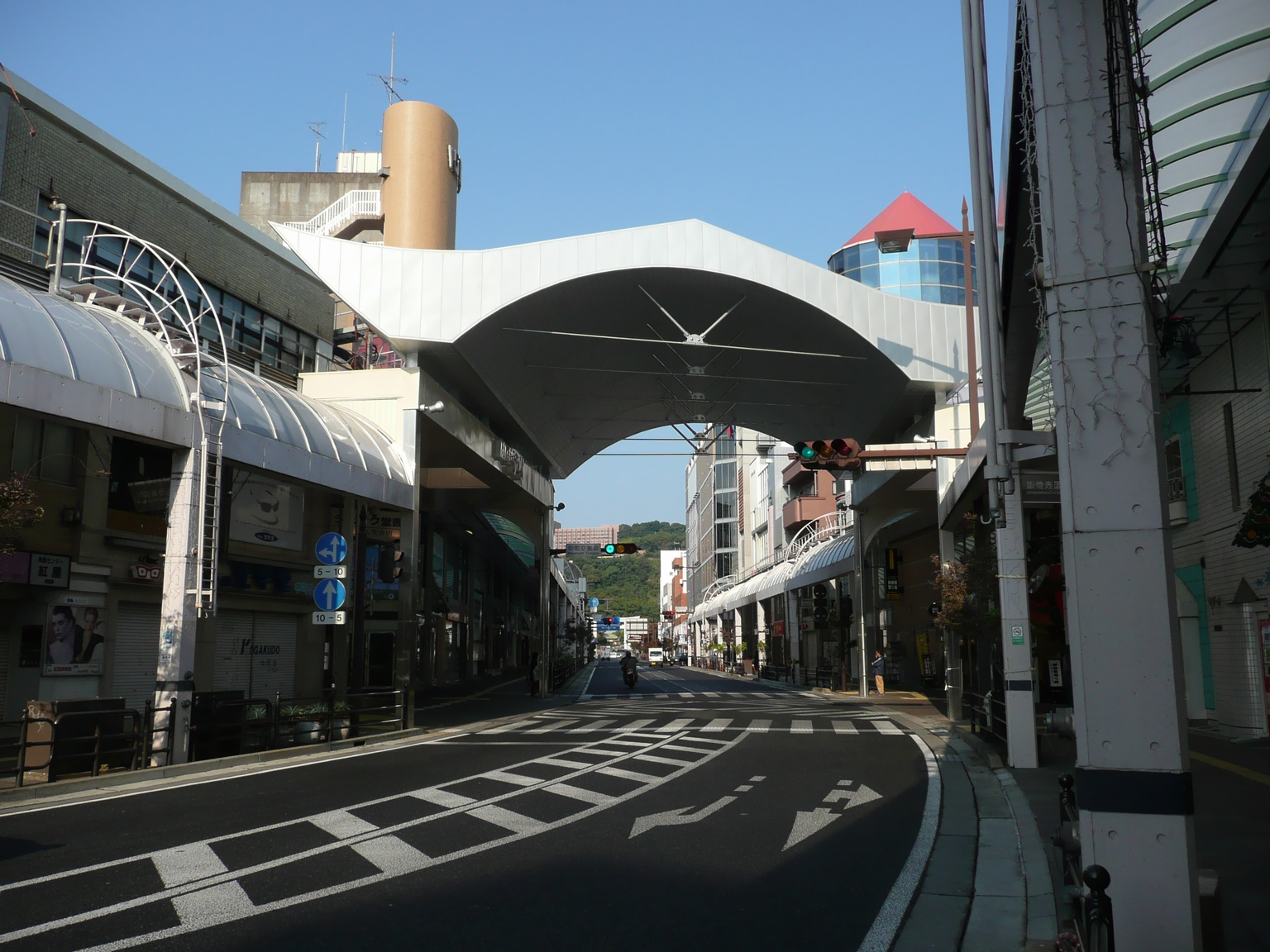

Route information
- Length: 53.1 km (33.0 mi)

Location
- Country: Japan

Highway system
- National highways of Japan; Expressways of Japan
| ← National Route 224 | → National Route 226 |

National Route 225 is a national highway of Japan connecting Makurazaki, Kagoshima, and Kagoshima, Kagoshima, in Japan, with a total length of 53.1 km (32.99 mi).
