= Shimazu Estate =

The Shimazu Estate (島津荘, Shimazu no shō) was a shōen (estate or manor) in southern Kyushu of Japan, covering large portions of Satsuma, Ōsumi and Hyūga Provinces. It was the largest shōen of medieval Japan. The Shimazu clan took its name from this estate as the clan succeeded the position of jitō (land steward).

== History ==
=== Heian Period ===
No contemporary source recorded the foundation of the Shimazu Estate. According to a document dated circa 1291, a "wasteland belonging to no one" was developed during the Manju era (1024–1028) and was donated to Kampaku (de facto ruler of Japan) Fujiwara no Yorimichi to break free from the provincial government's control. Another document states that its founder was Taira no Suemoto, the Dazai Daigen (high-ranking official of the administrative center of Kyūshū). It is likely that Taira no Suemoto was the founder of the Chinzei Heishi, a branch line of the Taira clan in Kyushu. A notable member of the Chinzei Heishi was Ata Tadakage.

The Shimazu Estate originally covered Shimazu, Morokata District of southern Hyūga Province (modern-day Miyakonojō, Miyazaki Prefecture) but was soon expanded into the neighboring lands of the province. Under the patronage of the powerful Fujiwara clan, Taira no Suemoto exercised effective administrative control over the lands. In 1029, Taira no Suemoto even raided the government office of the neighboring Ōsumi Province but a fragmentary sources suggest that he was not punished severely.

The Shimazu Estate was expanded substantially in the first half of the 12th century. Large portions of Satsuma, Ōsumi (including the island of Tanegashima) and southern Hyūga became part of the estate, either as ichien no shō (estate under complete control) or yose gōri (where tax revenue was shared with the provincial government).

The Shimazu Estate was inherited by the Fujiwara family, but came under the control of the Taira clan in the second half of the 12th century. Yorimichi's 6th generation descendant, Kampaku Fujiwara no Motozane, was married to Taira no Moriko, a daughter of Taira no Kiyomori. After Motozane died in 1166, his widow Moriko managed the property of the Fujiwara clan. After Moriko's death in 1179, the estate was inherited by the Konoe branch family of the Fujiwara clan.

=== Kamakura Period ===
With the establishment of the Kamakura shogunate, supporters of the Taira clan were replaced by the shōgun's retainers. In 1185, Koremune no Tadahisa was appointed as jitō of the Shimazu Estate. Although he was originally a retainer of the Konoe family, he moved in an inner circle of the shogunate for his kinship ties with the first shōgun Minamoto no Yoritomo and his powerful retainer Hiki Yoshikazu. He was also appointed as the military governor of Satsuma, Ōsumi and Hyūga Provinces. Thereafter he claimed the clan name of Shimazu, which indicated the ownership of the estate.

By the time Tadahisa took the position of jitō, the Shimazu Estate occupied 70% of agricultural fields of Satsuma Province although over 70% of the lands were yose gōri and were not under the estate's full control. A small portion of the Shimazu Estate in Satsuma was controlled by the Chiba clan. In Satsuma, the provincial government was fused with the Shimazu Estate, as a large overlap in membership between the two polities is observed. The Shimazu Estate's area of influence was smaller in Ōsumi Province, being just over half, and the largest part of the remaining portion was controlled by Ōsumi Shō-Hachimangū. However, it had a stronger control over the land, as over half of the lands were ichien no shō. The provincial government and the estate remained largely separate entities.

In 1203, Shimazu Tadahisa was ousted from his positions as a jitō of the estate and the military governor of the three provinces because his relative Hiki Yoshikazu was annihilated by the Hōjō clan. He managed to regain the posts of the jitō of the Shimazu Estate in Satsuma (1213) and the military governor of Satsuma Province (1205). However, the jitō of the estate in Ōsumi and the military governor of Ōsumi Province were succeeded by the Hōjō clan. The Nagoe branch family of the Hōjō clan maintained the post of jitō in Ōsumi until the end of the Kamakura period. They sent the Higo clan to Ōsumi as deputy rulers. After the Hōjō clan was annihilated, one line of the Higo clan made itself autonomous in Tanegashima and began to claim the clan name of Tanegashima. The post of the military governor of Ōsumi Province was transferred from the Nagoe family to the Chiba clan in the early 1280s and then to the Kanesawa branch family of the Hōjō clan in the early 1290s. Because the Nagoe family kept the position of the jitō of the estate in Ōsumi, the military governor had to devote much effort to consolidate power. In fact, Kanesawa Tokinao actively incorporated the officials of the military government as his retainers and relabeled their lands as the "private territories of the military governor" (守護私領).

Even in Satsuma Province, the Shimazu clan's rule was not stable. As a result of the Jōkyū War, Satsuma's Kawanabe District came under the control of the Tokusō (mainline) family of the Hōjō clan. Hōjō's retainer, the Chikama clan, served as the district governor and deputy jitō of Kawanabe District.

=== Afterwards ===
During the downfall of the Kamakura shogunate, Shimazu Sadahisa successfully sided with Ashikaga Takauji. In reward for his service, the Shimazu clan won back the jitō of the Shimazu Estate in Ōsumi and the military governor of Ōsumi and Hyūga Provinces. Because the military government and the estate in Ōsumi remained distinct entities, the Shimazu clan had much trouble regaining control over the province and eventually collapsed.
