= Chikama Tokiie =

Japanese gokenin

Chikama Tokiie (千竃時家) (fl. early 14th century) was a gokenin and simultaneously a retainer of the Hōjō clan of the Kamakura shogunate in Japan.

== Background ==
The Chikama clan originated from Chikama, Owari Province (modern-day Minami-ku, Nagoya) and remained the ruler of Chikama as a gokenin, or vassal family of the shogunate. At some time in history, the Chikama clan became a private retainer of the Hōjō Tokusō family, which was the de facto ruler of the shogunate. The Chikama clan moved to Kawanabe District of Satsuma Province, a property of the Tokusō family, to serve as a deputy jitō and the ruler of the district.

== Domain and significance ==
Chikama Tokiie is known for a set of documents he created in 1306. In these documents he listed properties to be inherited by his family members, namely his three sons, two daughters and two wives. These properties were distributed among the following:

- Chikama, Owari Province
- Kawanabe District, Satsuma Province
- Asabata, Suruga Province
- Wakamori, Hitachi Province

Kawanabe District and Wakamori were properties of the Tokusō family, and the Chikama clan served it as a deputy ruler. It is significant that the villages enumerated in the Kawanabe District were located in the Manose River valley because the Mottaimatsu Site, which is considered to have served as a major trading center, was downstream of the Manose River. Apart from the Manose River, he also owned Bōnotsu, a trading port that was connected to Hakata Bay, China and the Ryukyu Islands.

These documents include various southern islands, including some of the Ōsumi Islands, the Tokara Islands (the Seven), as well as Kikai Island, Amami Ōshima and Tokunoshima, and probably Okinoerabu of the Amami Islands. Although the Amami Islands were traditionally not considered to be part of Japan, they were treated as the territories of a Japanese lord. Another source probably making reference to this is a map of Japan stored at the Kanazawa Bunko, a library of the Hōjō clan. It depicts a land mass outside the boundary of Japan where the caption reads "龍及國宇嶋身人頭鳥雨見嶋私領郡" (*U-shima, State/Province of Ryūkyū [where people have] a human body but a bird head; Amami Island(s), a privately owned district). The latter half suggests that (the Hōjō clan considered that) the Amami Islands were not part of Japan but anyway owned by Japanese.
