= Japan National Route 226 =

National highway in Japan

National Route 226
- 国道226号
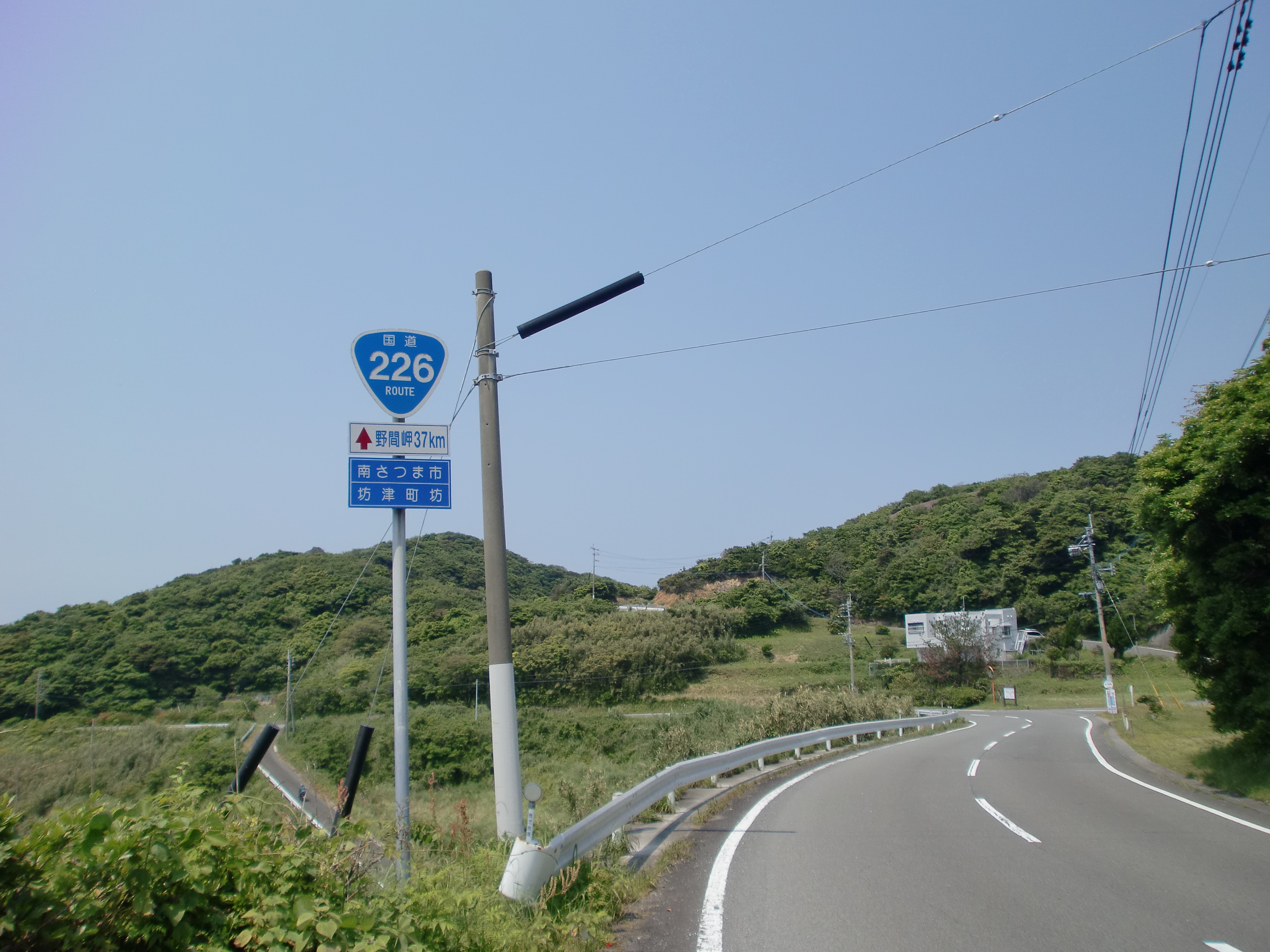

Route information
- Length: 157.4 km (97.8 mi)

Location
- Country: Japan

Highway system
- National highways of Japan; Expressways of Japan
← National Route 225	→ National Route 227

National Route 226 is a national highway of Japan connecting Minamisatsuma, Kagoshima, and Kagoshima, Kagoshima, in Japan, with a total length of 157.4 km (97.8 mi).
