= Ibusuki no Tamatebako =

Japanese limited express train service

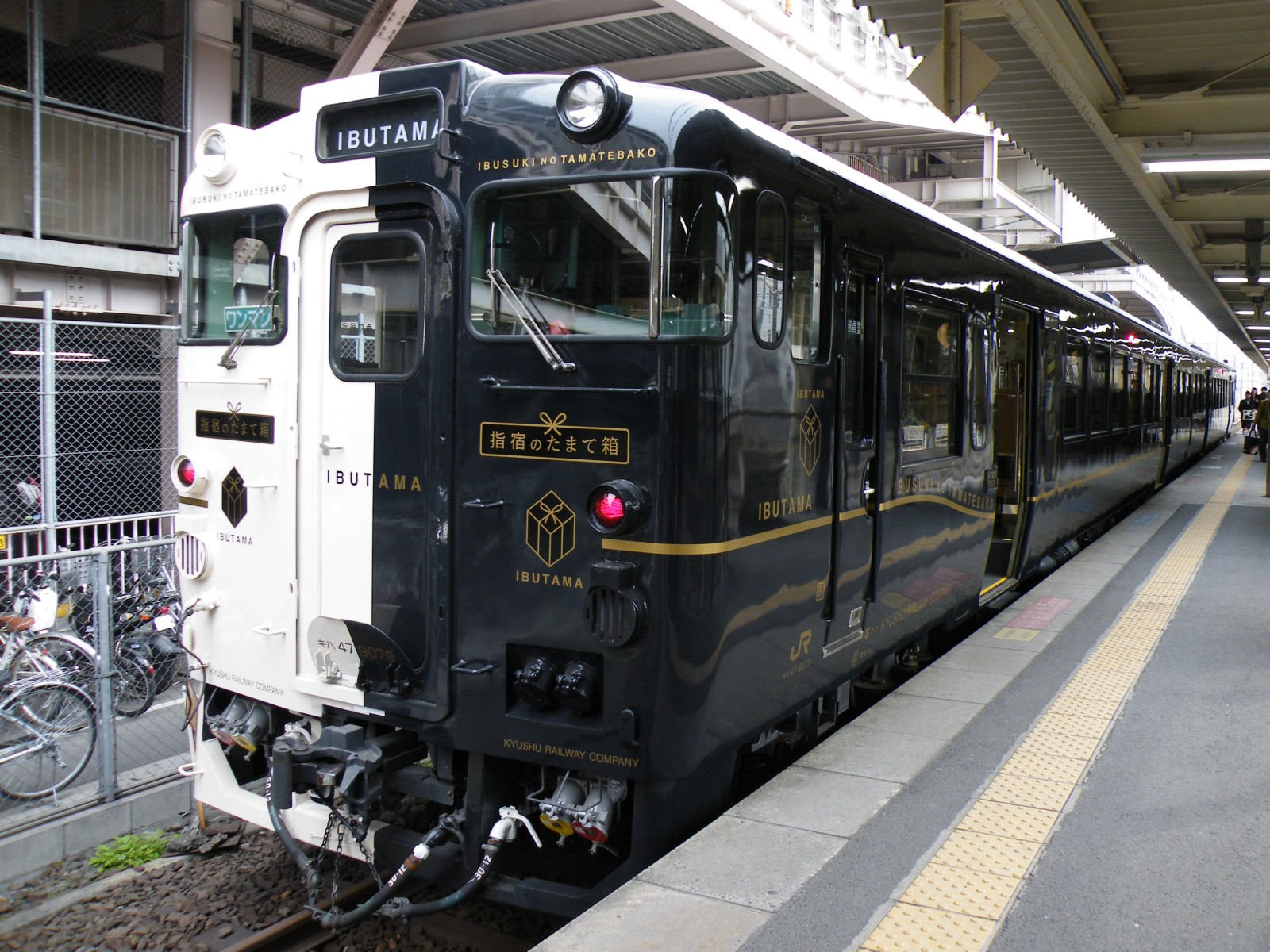
- Ibusuki no Tamatebako at Kagoshima-Chūō Station on 12 March 2011

Overview
- Service type: Limited express
- Status: In operation
- Locale: Ibusuki Makurazaki Line
- First service: 12 March 2011
- Current operator(s): JR Kyushu

Route
- Termini: Kagoshima-Chūō; Ibusuki
- Stops: 3
- Distance travelled: 45.7 km (28.4 mi)
- Service frequency: 3 return trips daily

On-board services
- Class(es): Standard only
- Disabled access: Yes
- Catering facilities: Yes
- Observation facilities: Yes
- Entertainment facilities: Yes
- Other facilities: Toilet

Technical
- Rolling stock: KiHa 47/140 DMUs
- Track gauge: 1,067 mm (3 ft 6 in)
- Electrification: Diesel
- Operating speed: 95 km/h (59 mph)
- Track owner(s): JR Kyushu

The Ibusuki no Tamatebako (指宿のたまて箱, lit. 'Ibusuki's Pandora Box') is a limited express service operated by Kyushu Railway Company (JR Kyushu) in Japan since March 2011. It operates between Kagoshima-Chūō Station and Ibusuki Station via the Ibusuki Makurazaki Line.

== Service pattern ==
There are three return services per day. All trains stop at Kiire.

== Rolling stock ==
The train was originally formed of two specially modified KiHa 47 diesel multiple unit cars, KiHa 47-8060 and KiHa 47-9079 (formerly KiHa 47-1079), based at Kagoshima Depot. The two cars were converted at JR Kyushu's Kokura Works. A third car, KiHa 140-2066, formerly used in the Hayato no Kaze DMU set, was rebuilt in 2012 to Ibusuki no Tamatebako style, entering service from 24 March 2012.

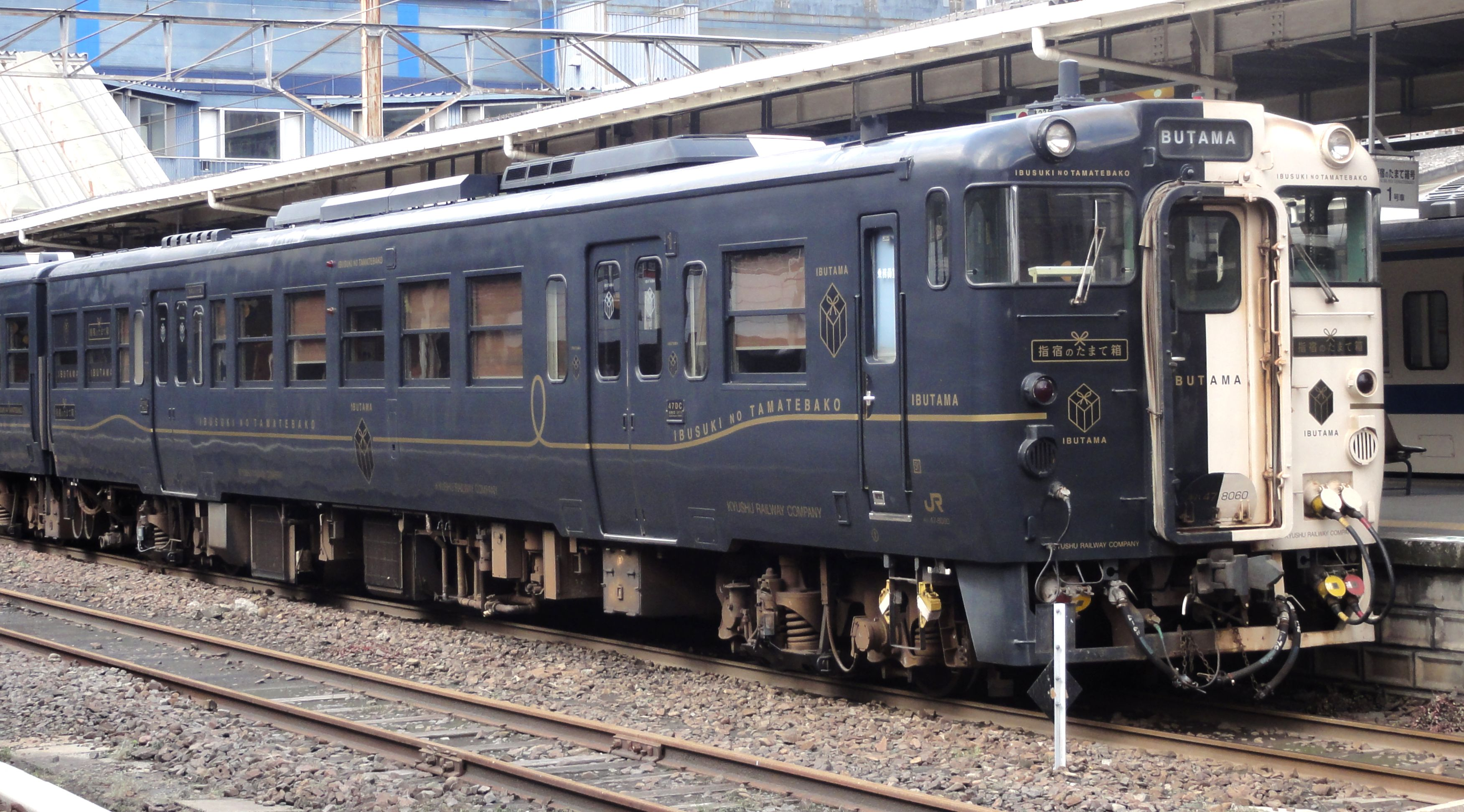
Car 1: KiHa 47-8060

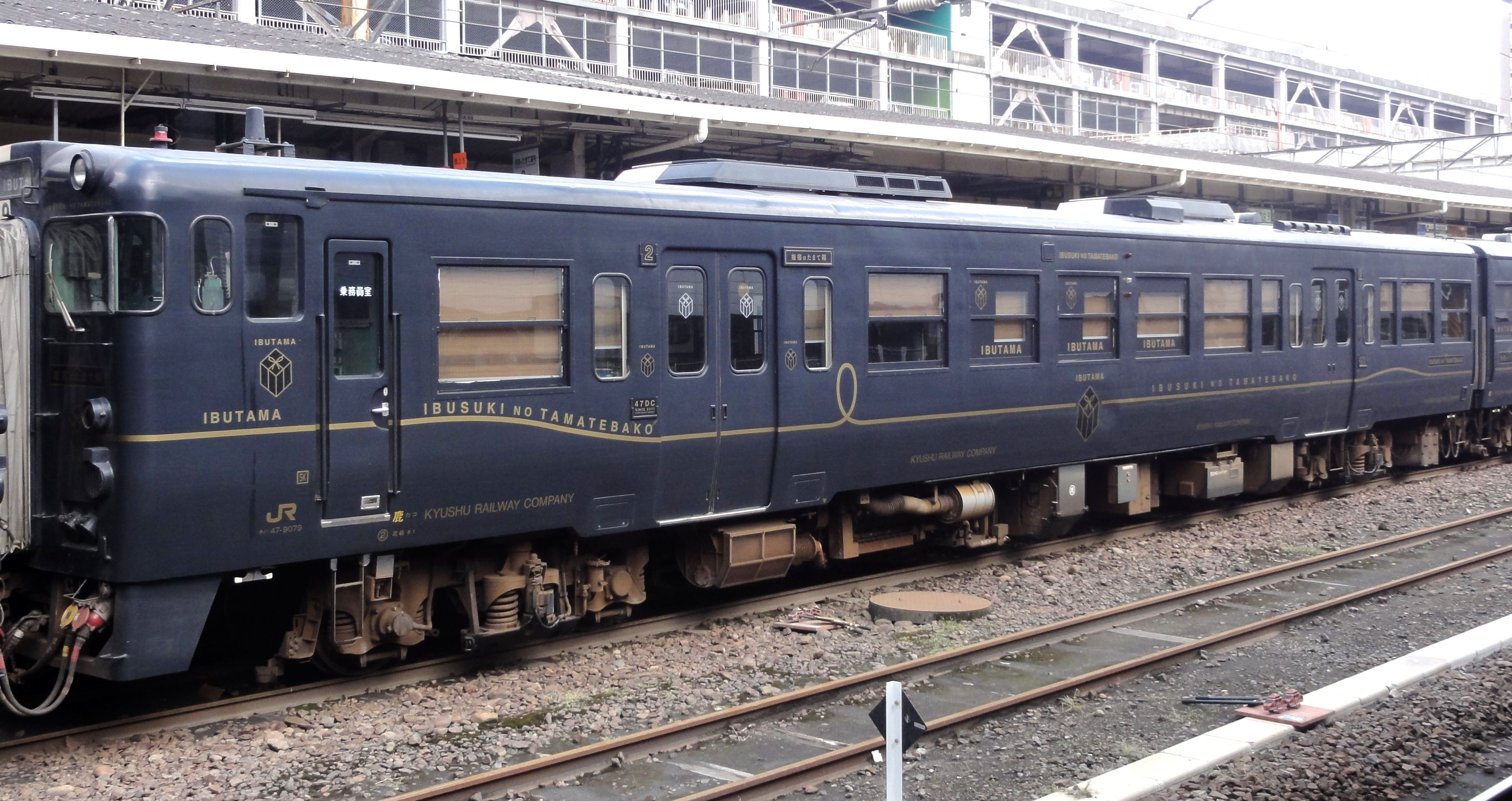
Car 2: KiHa 47-9079

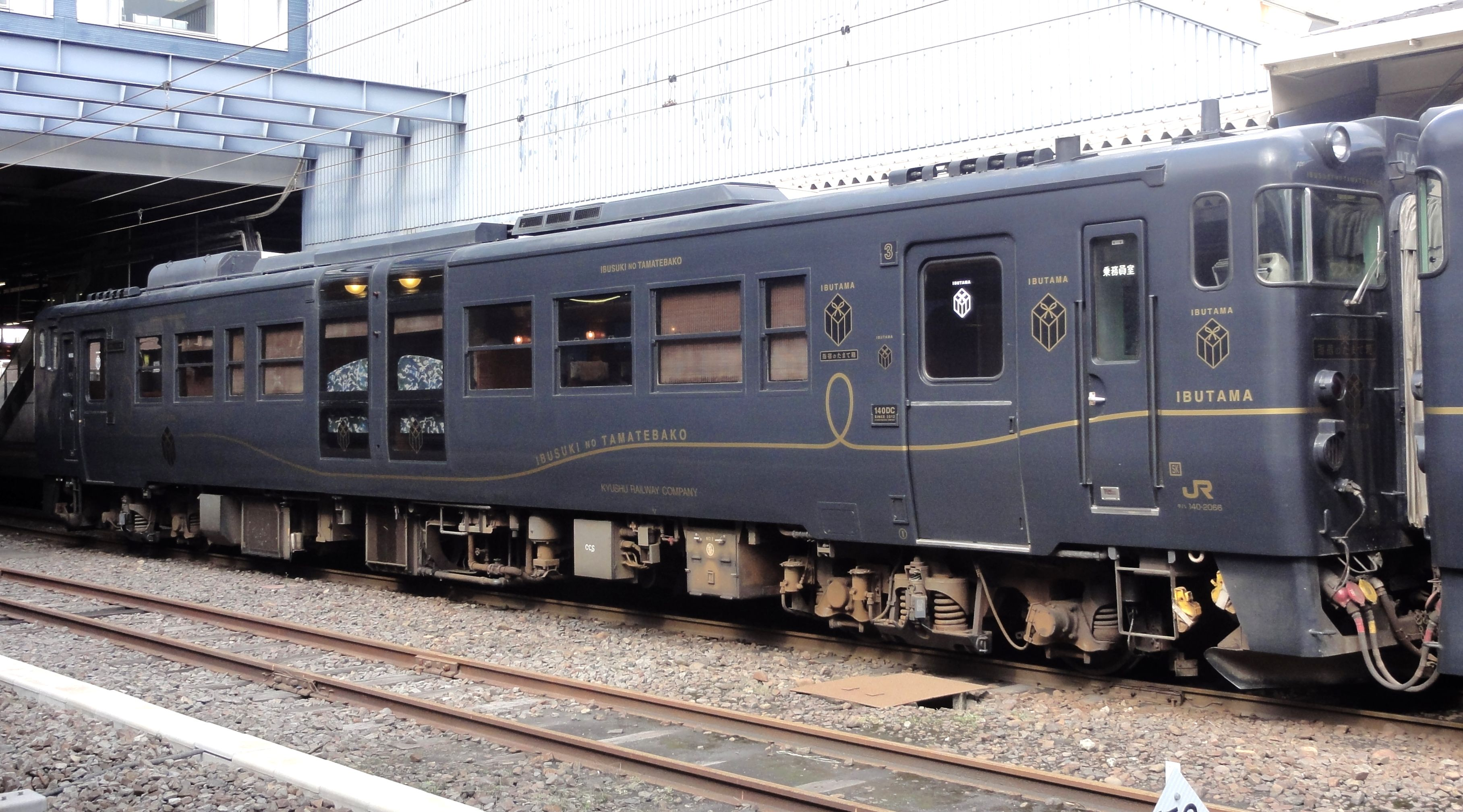
Car 3: KiHa 140-2066

=== Exterior ===
The train is painted black on the landward side, and white on the seaward side, with gold lining and lettering.

=== Interior ===
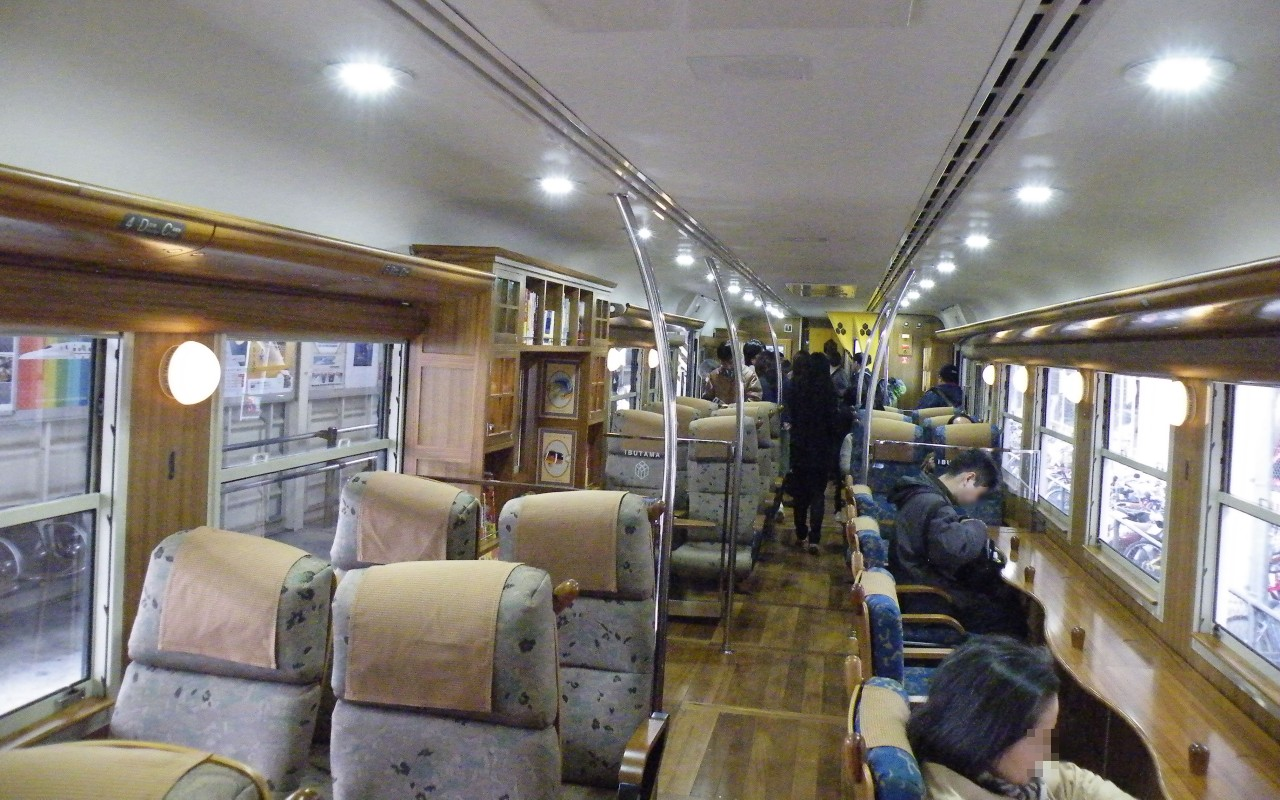
Interior view of KiHa 47-8060 (car 1), March 2011

The interior design of the train was overseen by industrial designer Eiji Mitooka. The train features totally new interiors with extensive use of wood for flooring, wall panels, and seating. Some seats are arranged facing the windows on the seaward side of the train.

== History ==
The Ibusuki no Tamatebako service was introduced on 12 March 2011, coinciding with the full opening of the Kyushu Shinkansen.

A third car, KiHa 140-2066, was modified and added to formations at weekends and busy seasons from 24 March 2012.

== See also ==
- Joyful Train
