= Aru Ressha =

Japanese luxury excursion train service

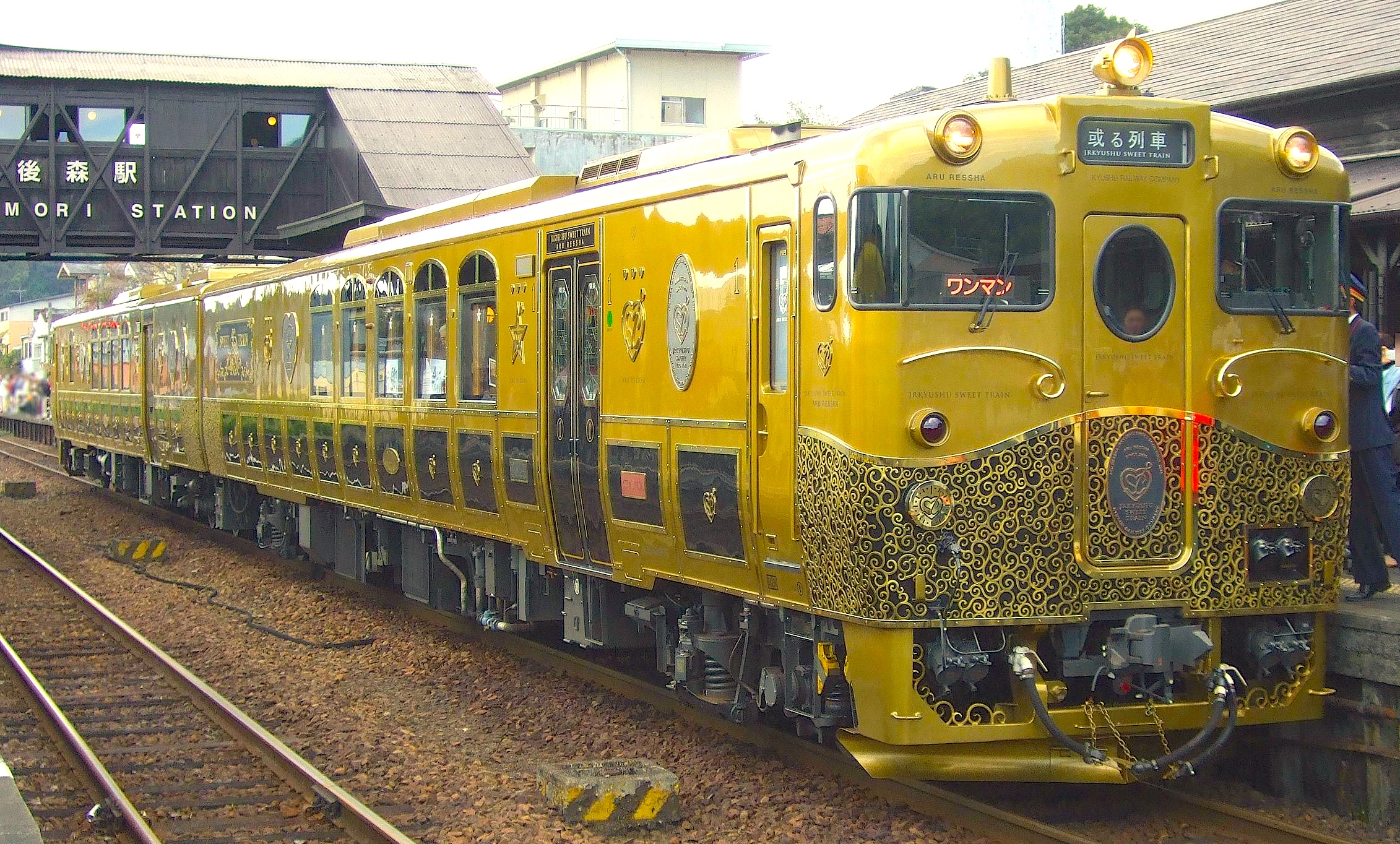
The Aru Ressha trainset in 2015

The Aru Ressha (或る列車) is a luxury excursion train operated by Kyushu Railway Company (JR Kyushu) in Japan since 2015. It comprises a two-car diesel-powered railcar heavily modified to parody the style, especially in its window treatment, of passenger cars supplied to Japan by the J. G. Brill Company of Philadelphia, United States of America in 1908.

== Overview ==
Details of the train, named the "Sweet Train", were first announced in 2014; it entered service on 8 August 2015.

The name derives from the sweets (desserts) (Note: "Dessert" is the word most commonly used for the final, sweet-tasting course of a meal in Australia, Canada, Ireland, New Zealand and the United States. In the United Kingdom and some other Commonwealth countries, dessert is one of several synonyms that include "pudding", "sweet" and "afters".) served on board; meals are designed and created in a Japanese–French style by chef Yoshihiro Narisawa, owner of the eponymous restaurant in Tokyo.

== Design ==
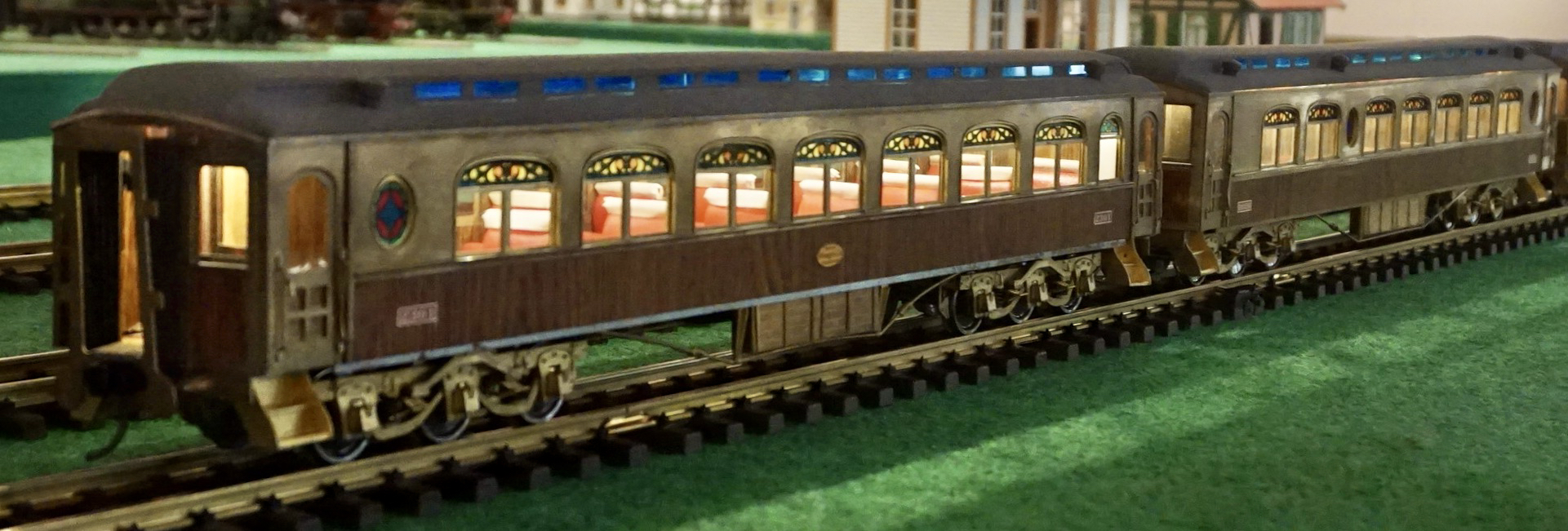
Models of the 12-wheel passenger cars delivered to Japan by the J.G. Brill Company in 1908, elements of which inspired the design of the Aru Ressha cars of 2015

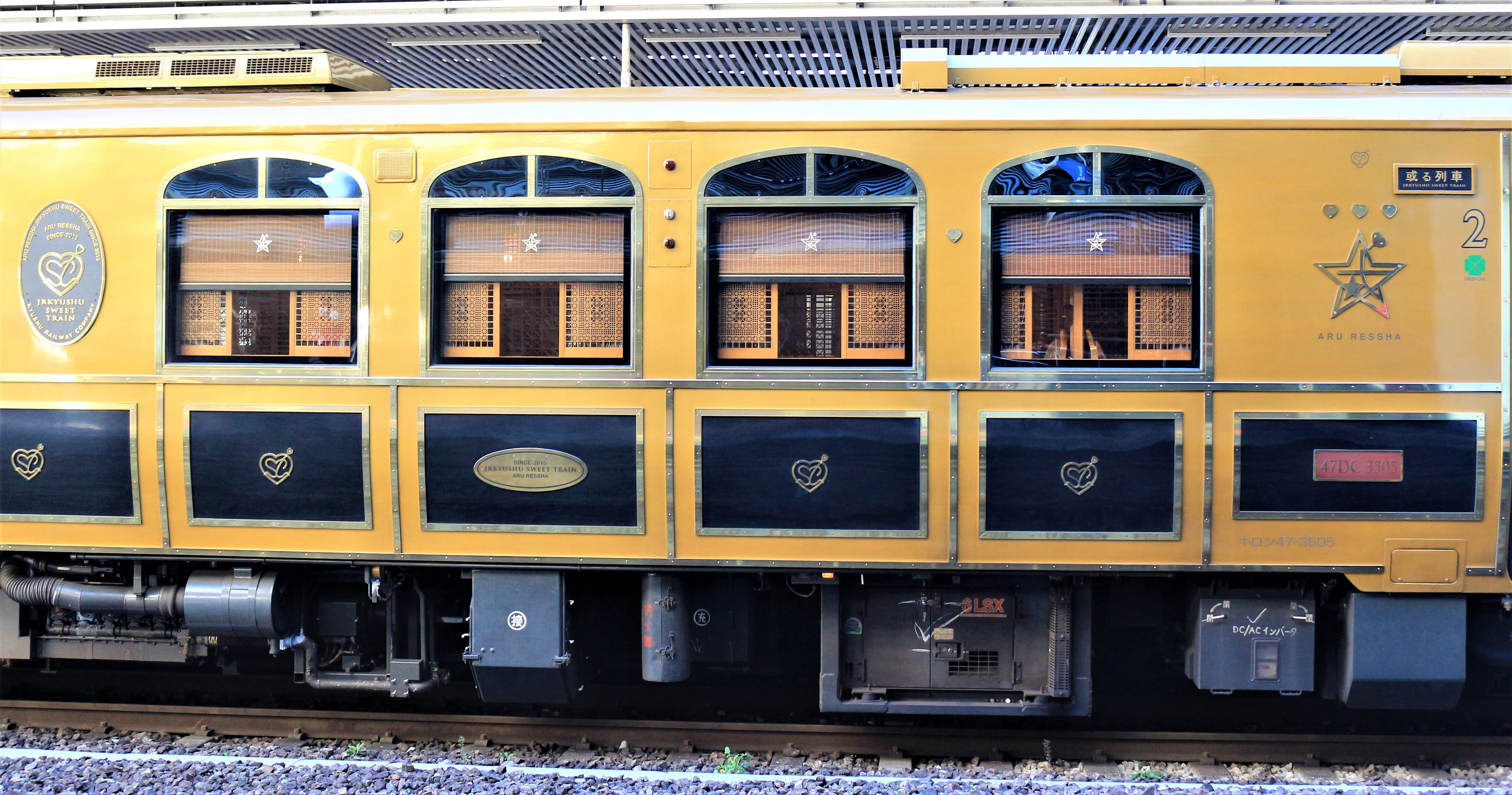
The windows replicate those of the Brill cars

The train consists of two modified former KiHa 47 series diesel railcars. It invokes the style and ambience of the luxurious, 12-wheel Brill passenger cars purchased by the Kyushu Railway in 1908. The purchase occurred just before the railway company was nationalized under the Railway Nationalization Act and the cars were never put into service.

The rebuilding project was overseen by industrial designer Eiji Mitooka, using scale models of the original coaches built by the railway modeller Nobutaro Hara. Car 1 (KiRoShi 47 9176) and Car 2 (KiRoShi 47 3505), formerly numbered KiHa 47 176 and 47 1505, were previously operated by JR Shikoku until withdrawn from service in 2011. Rebuilding work was carried out at JR Kyushu's Kokura General Rolling Stock Centre.

== Operations ==
Between July of one year to March of the following year, the train runs a daily round trip from Sasebo to Nagasaki, mostly on weekends. Between April and September, the train runs a daily round trip between Ōita and Hita. It was intended for the development of tourism and the local economy.

== See also ==
- List of named passenger trains of Japan
- Joyful Train, the generic name for excursion and charter trains in Japan
