= Eiji Mitooka =

Japanese industrial designer, and illustrator

- 水戸岡 鋭治
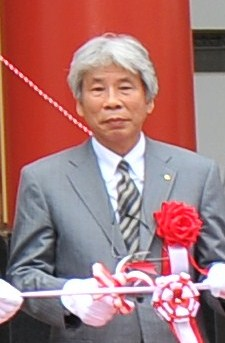
- Eiji Mitooka at the tape-cutting ceremony for Fujisan Station in July 2011
- Born: 5 July 1947 (age 79); Okayama Prefecture
- Occupation: Managing director of Don Design Associates
- Known for: Industrial design

Eiji Mitooka (水戸岡 鋭治, Mitooka Eiji; born 5 July 1947 in Okayama Prefecture) is a Japanese industrial designer, illustrator, and managing director of the industrial design company Don Design Associates (ドーンデザイン研究所). He also works as a design consultant for Kyushu Railway Company (JR Kyushu).

== Biography ==
Mitooka graduated from Okayama Technical High School in 1965.

After graduating from high school, Mitooka worked at Studio Silvo Coppola in Italy before founding Don Design Associates in 1972. The company oversees design projects for buildings, interiors, railway vehicles, graphics, and products.

In October 2011, Mitooka was awarded the 59th Kikuchi Kan Prize, presented annually by Bungei Shunju literary magazine and the Society for the Advancement of Japanese Culture.

== Projects ==
=== JR Kyushu projects ===
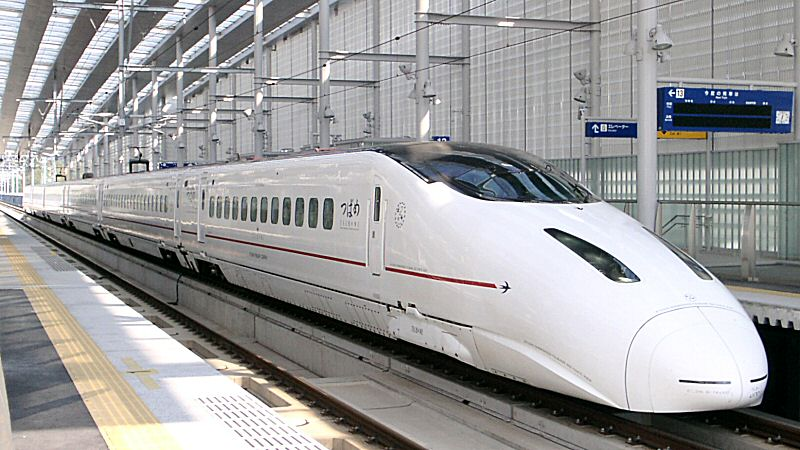
Kyushu Shinkansen 800 series, 2004

- Kagoshima-Chuo Station (formerly Nishi-Kagoshima Station) building
- Kumamoto Station building
- 787 series Tsubame electric multiple unit, 1993 Blue Ribbon Award winner
- 883 series Sonic electric multiple unit, 1996 Blue Ribbon Award winner
- Yufuin no Mori II KiHa 72 diesel multiple unit train, 1999
- 885 series Kamome electric multiple unit, 2001 Blue Ribbon Award winner
- Yufuin no Mori I KiHa 70 series diesel multiple unit train refurbishment, 2003
- Yufu DX KiHa 183 series diesel multiple unit train refurbishment, 2004
- Hayato no Kaze KiHa 47 series diesel multiple unit train refurbishment, 2004
- Trans-Kyushu Limited Express KiHa 185 series diesel multiple unit train refurbishment, 2004
- 800 Series Shinkansen, 2005 Laurel Prize winner
- KiHa 125-400 series Umisachi Yamasachi train (in service from 10 October 2009)
- Ibusuki no Tamatebako diesel multiple unit train (in service from 2011)
- KiHa 185 series A-Train (in service from 8 October 2011)
- Seven Stars in Kyushu luxury excursion train (in service from October 2013)
- 305 series EMU commuter trains for the Chikuhi Line (in service from February 2015)
- Aru Ressha luxury excursion train (in service from August 2015)
- BEC819 series battery EMU trains for the Fukuhoku Yutaka Line and Chikuhō Main Line (in service from October 2016)
- Kawasemi Yamasemi two-car diesel multiple unit tourist train conversion (in service from spring 2017)
- 811 series EMU refurbishment from 2017
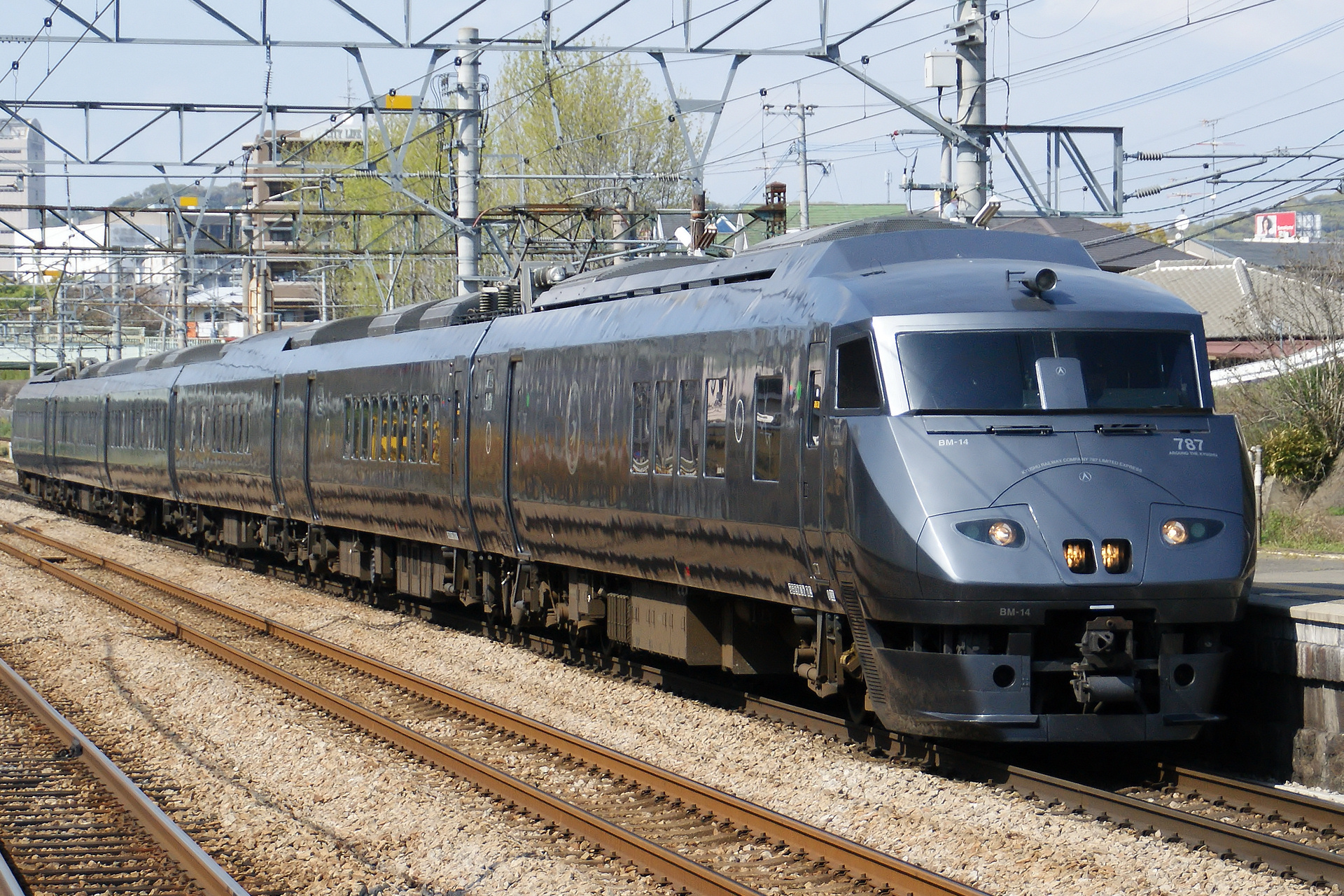
A JR Kyushu 787 series EDMU in April 2011

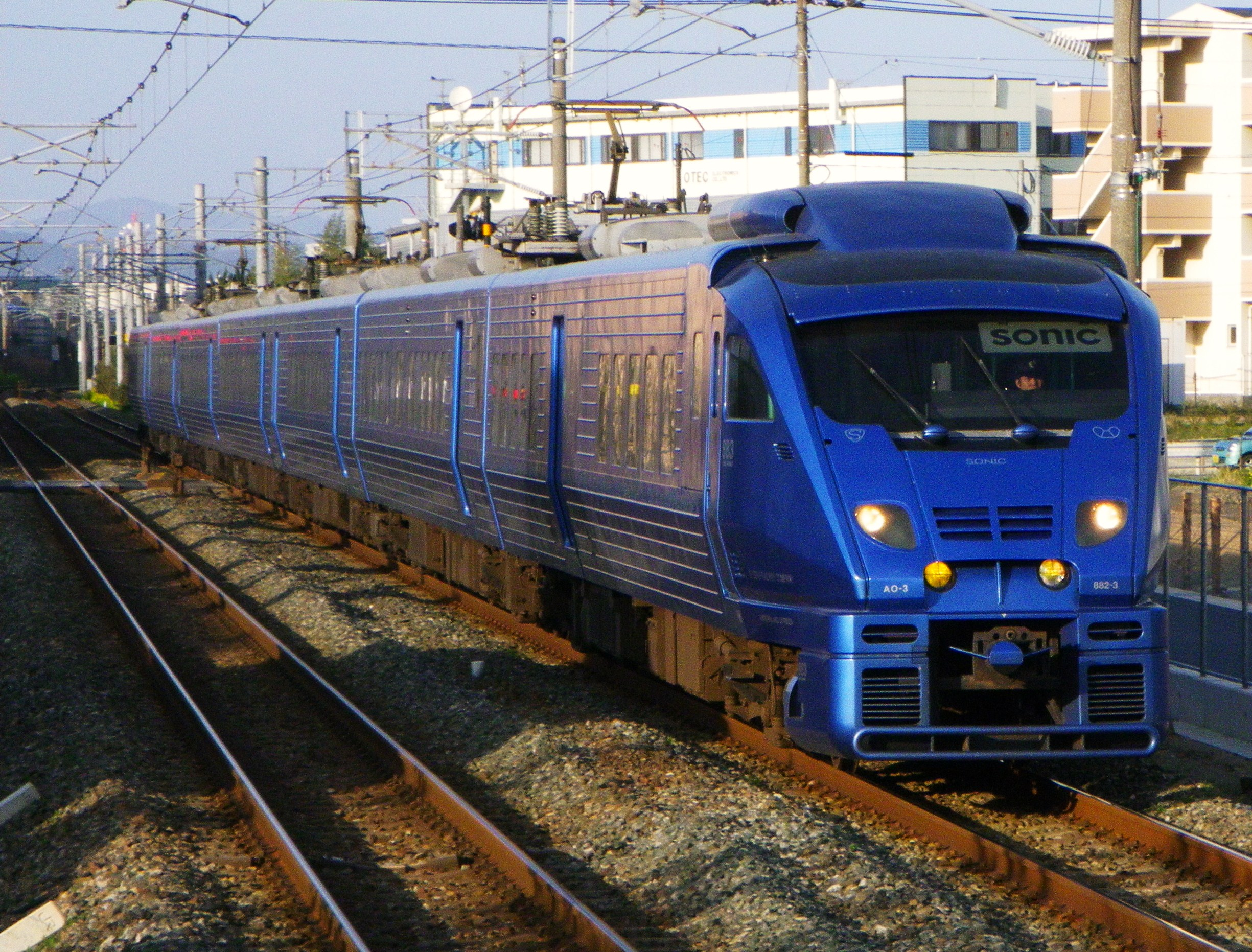
A JR Kyushu 883 series EMU in March 2010

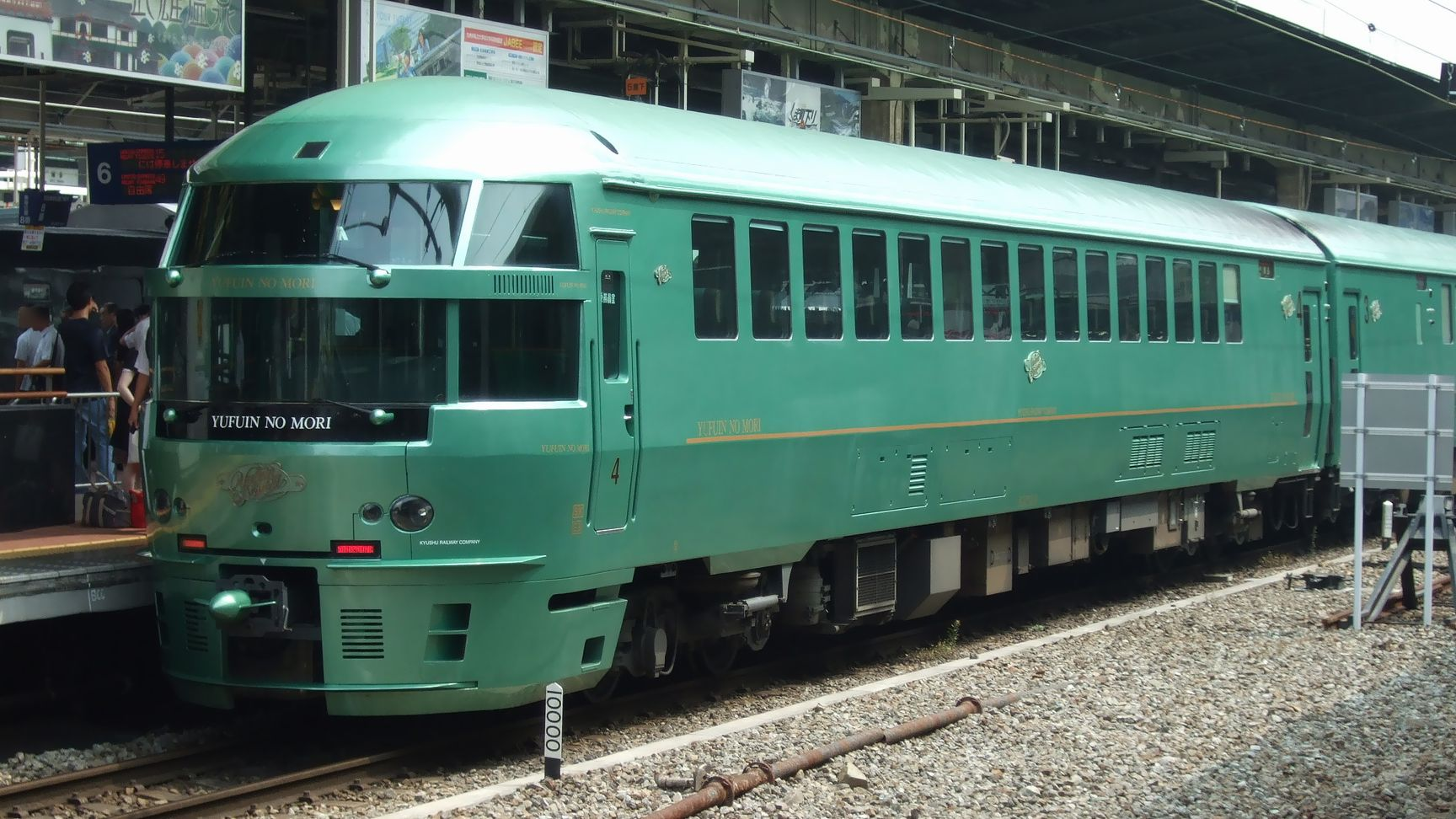
Yufuin no Mori II DMU in August 2008

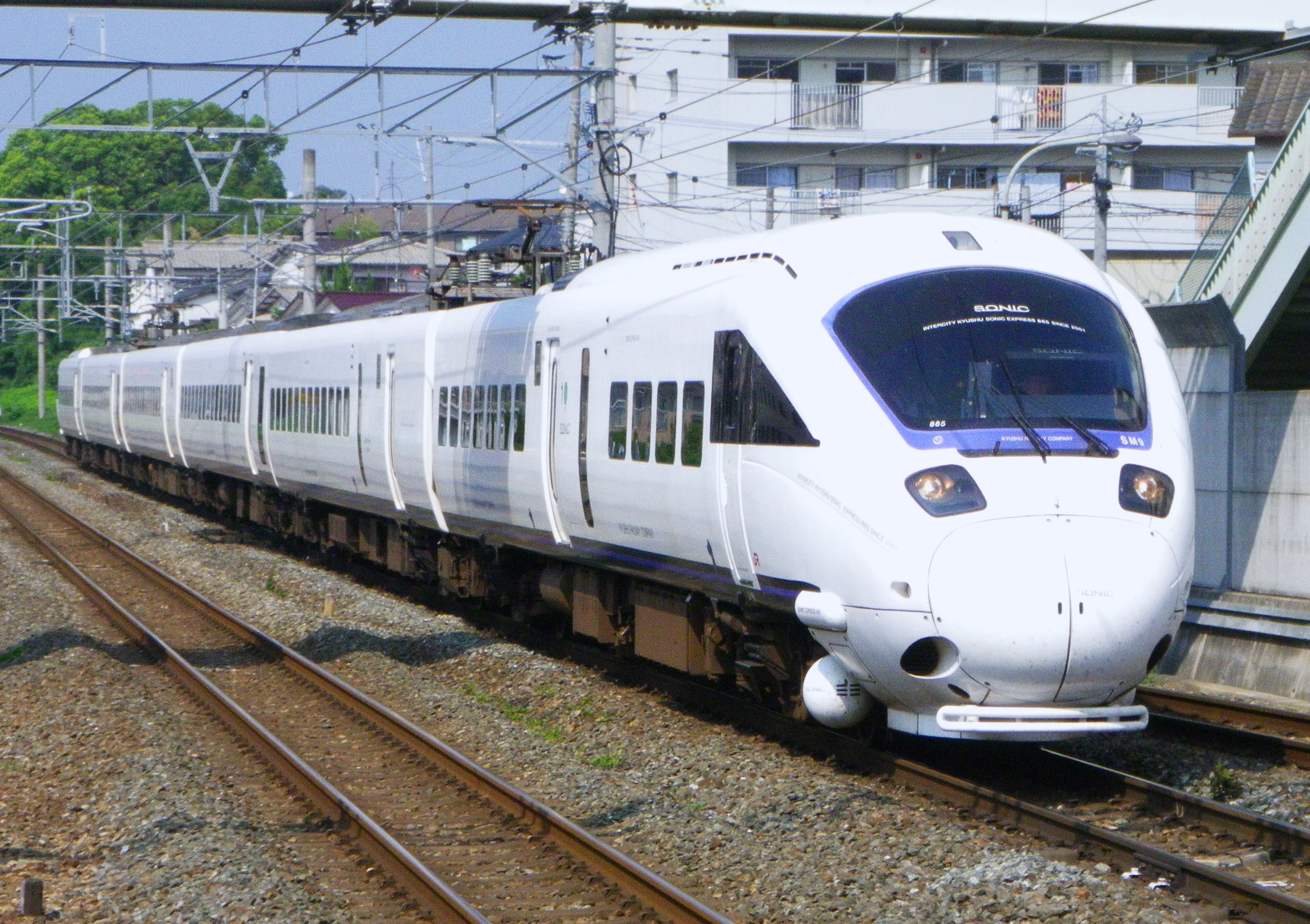
885 series EMU in August 2010

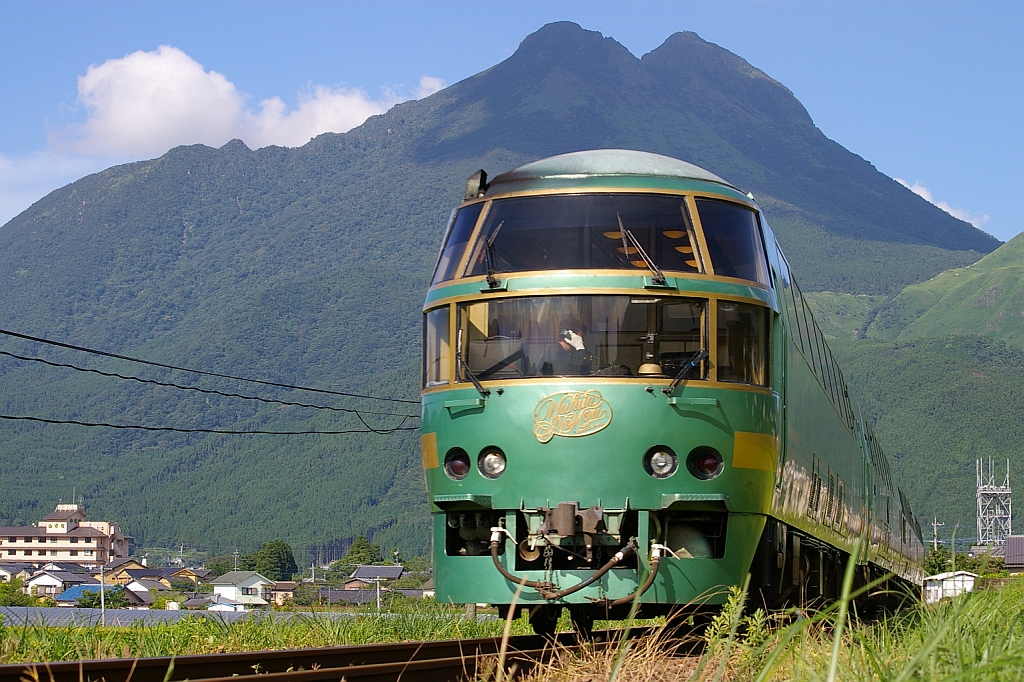
Yufuin no Mori I DMU in August 2006

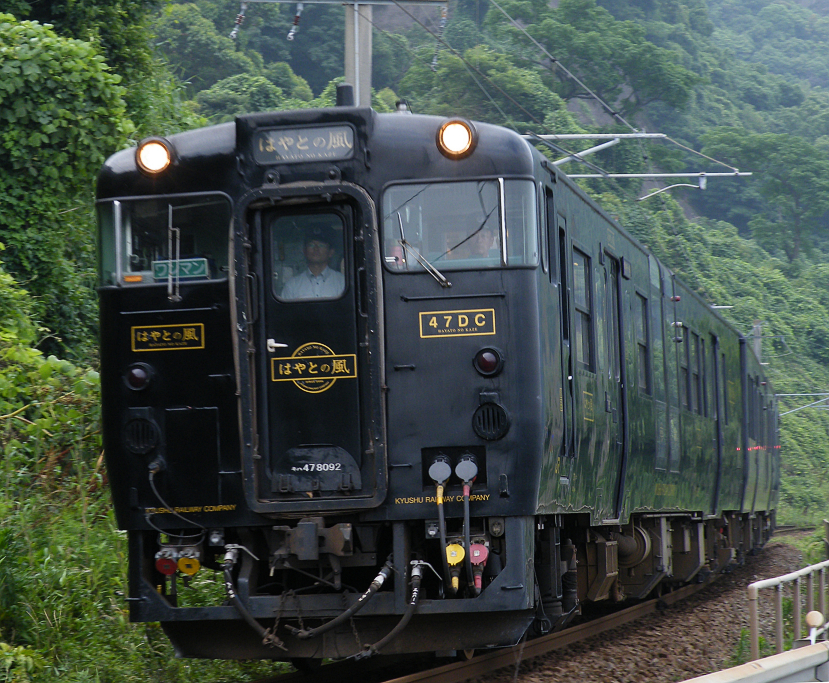
Hayato no Kaze DMU

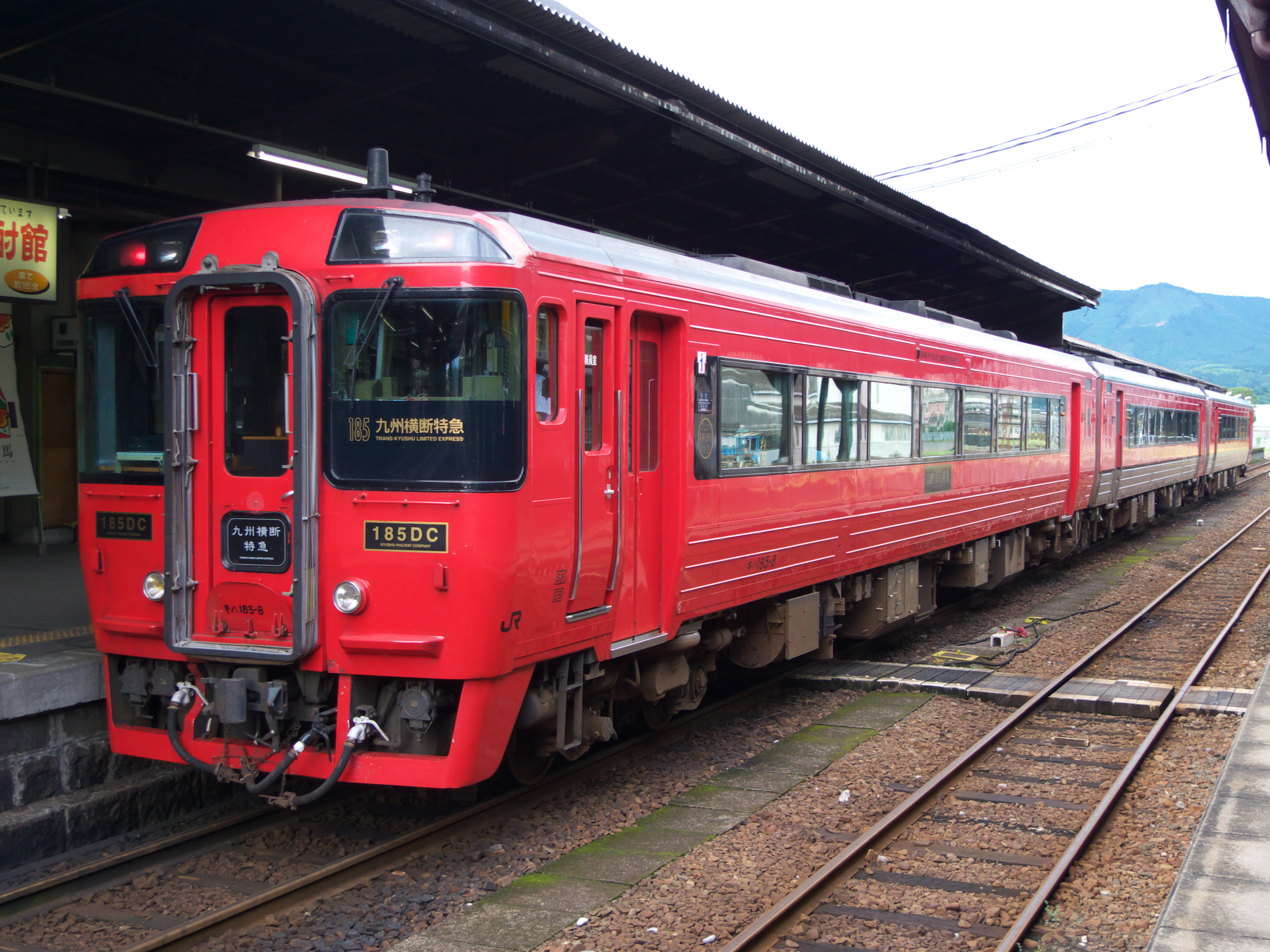
Trans-Kyushu Limited Express KiHa 185 series DMU in September 2010

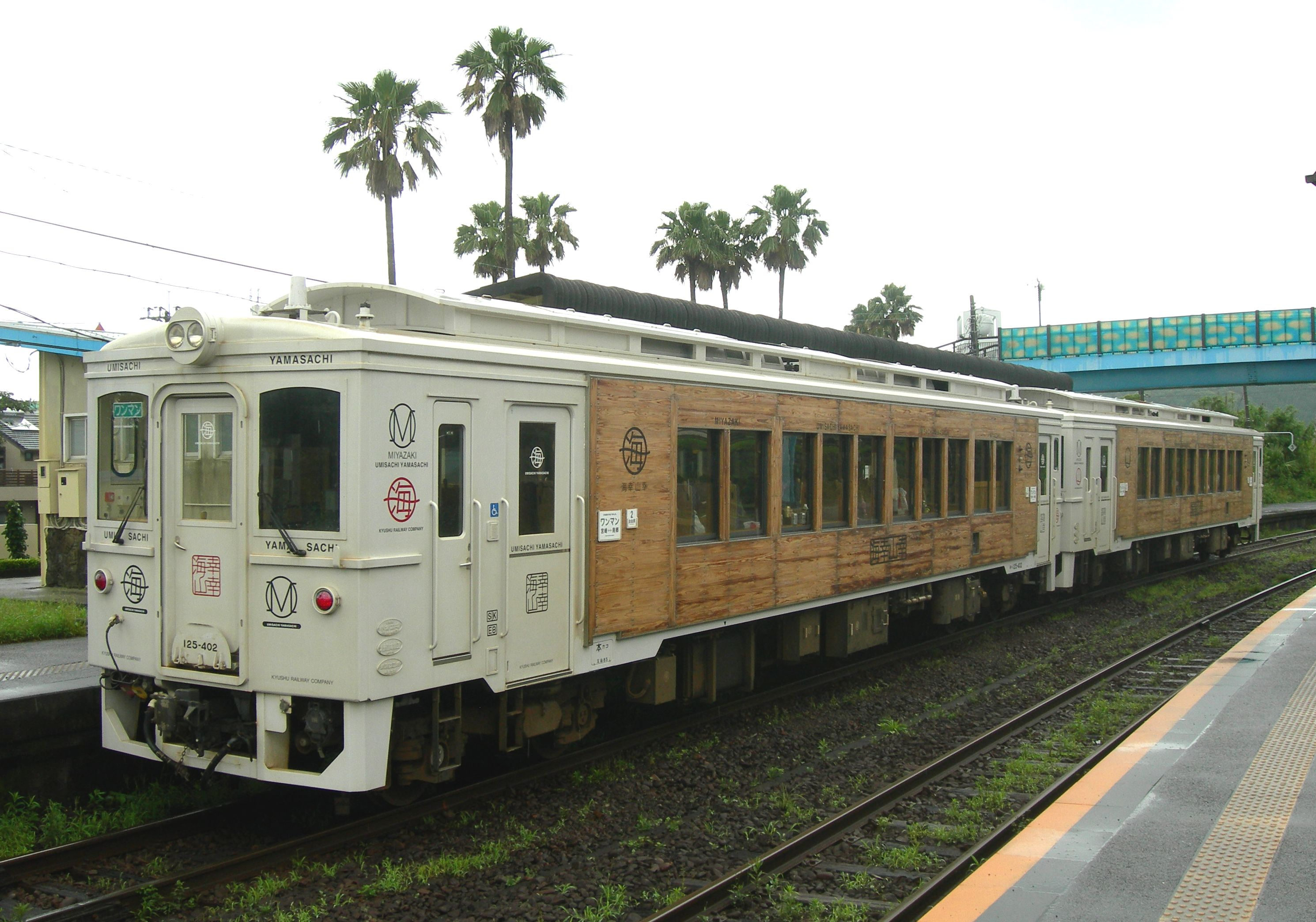
KiHa 125-400 series Umisachi Yamasachi train in June 2010

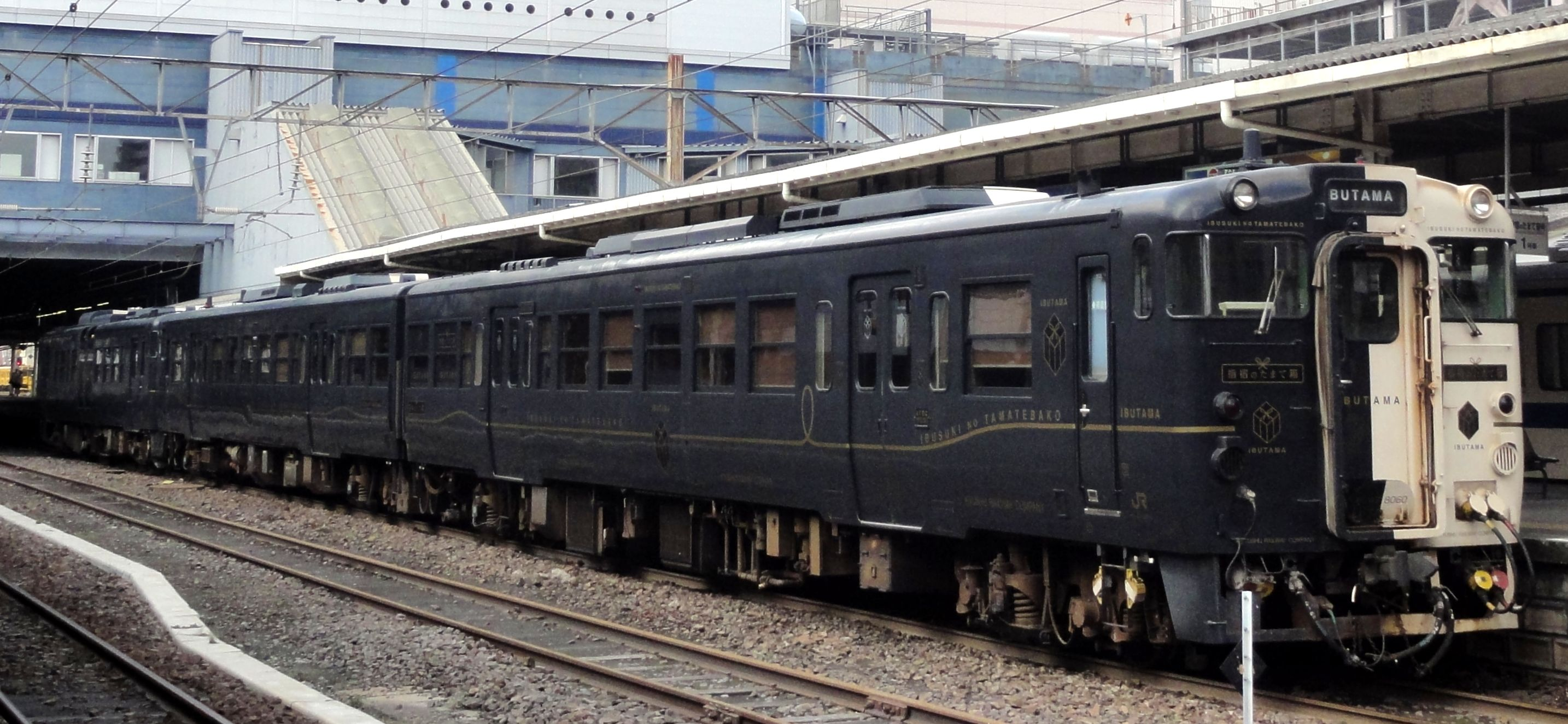
The KiHa 47 Ibusuki no Tamatebako train in August 2012

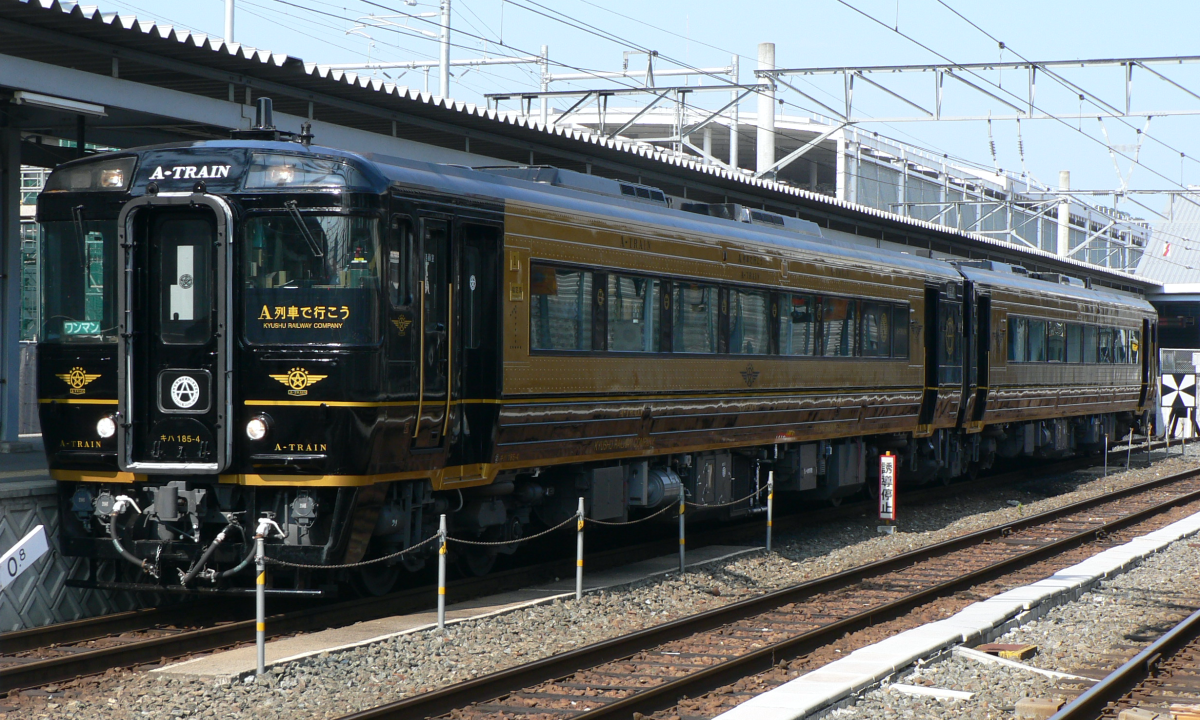
KiHa 185 series A-Train, October 2011

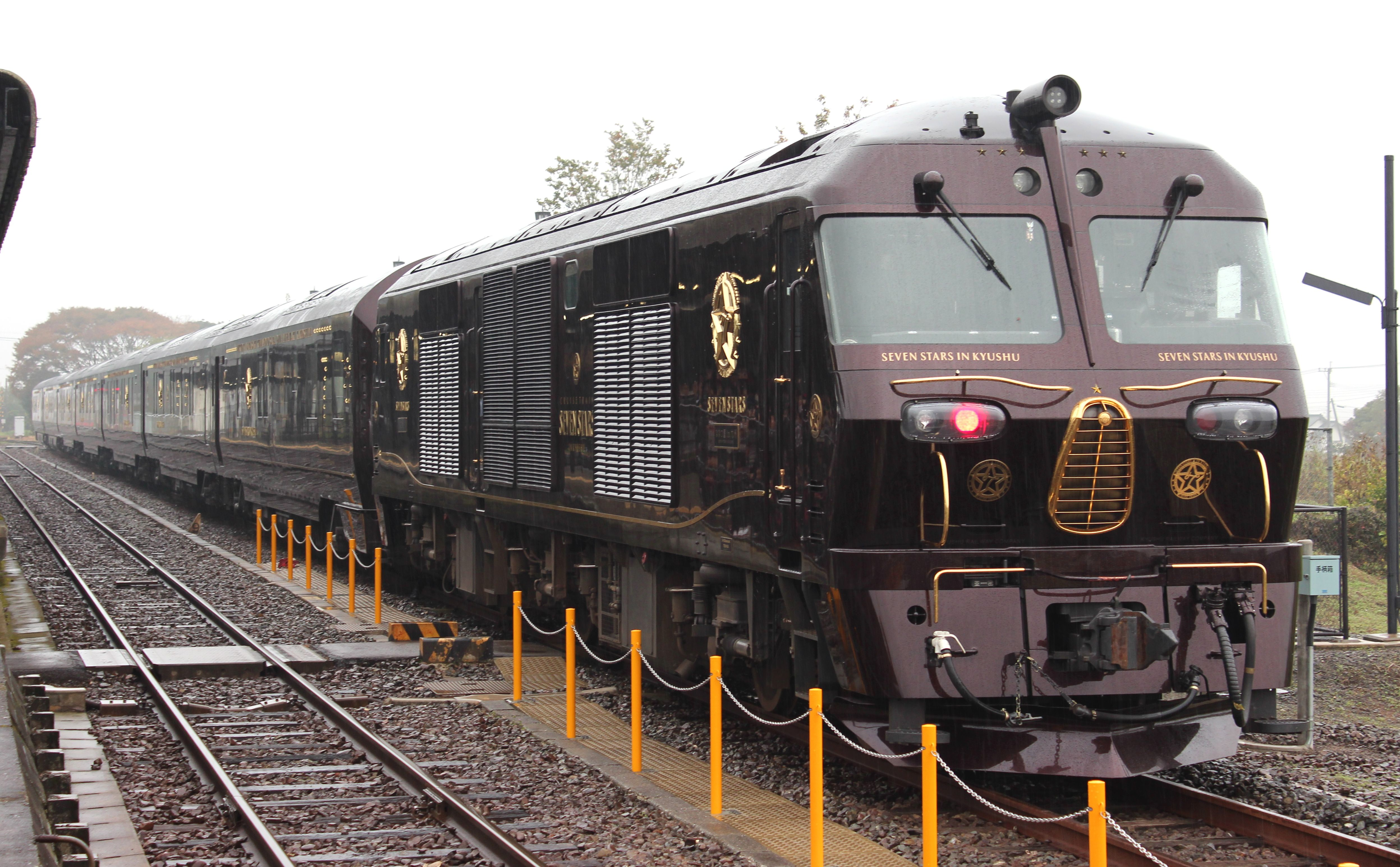
Seven Stars in Kyushu in November 2013

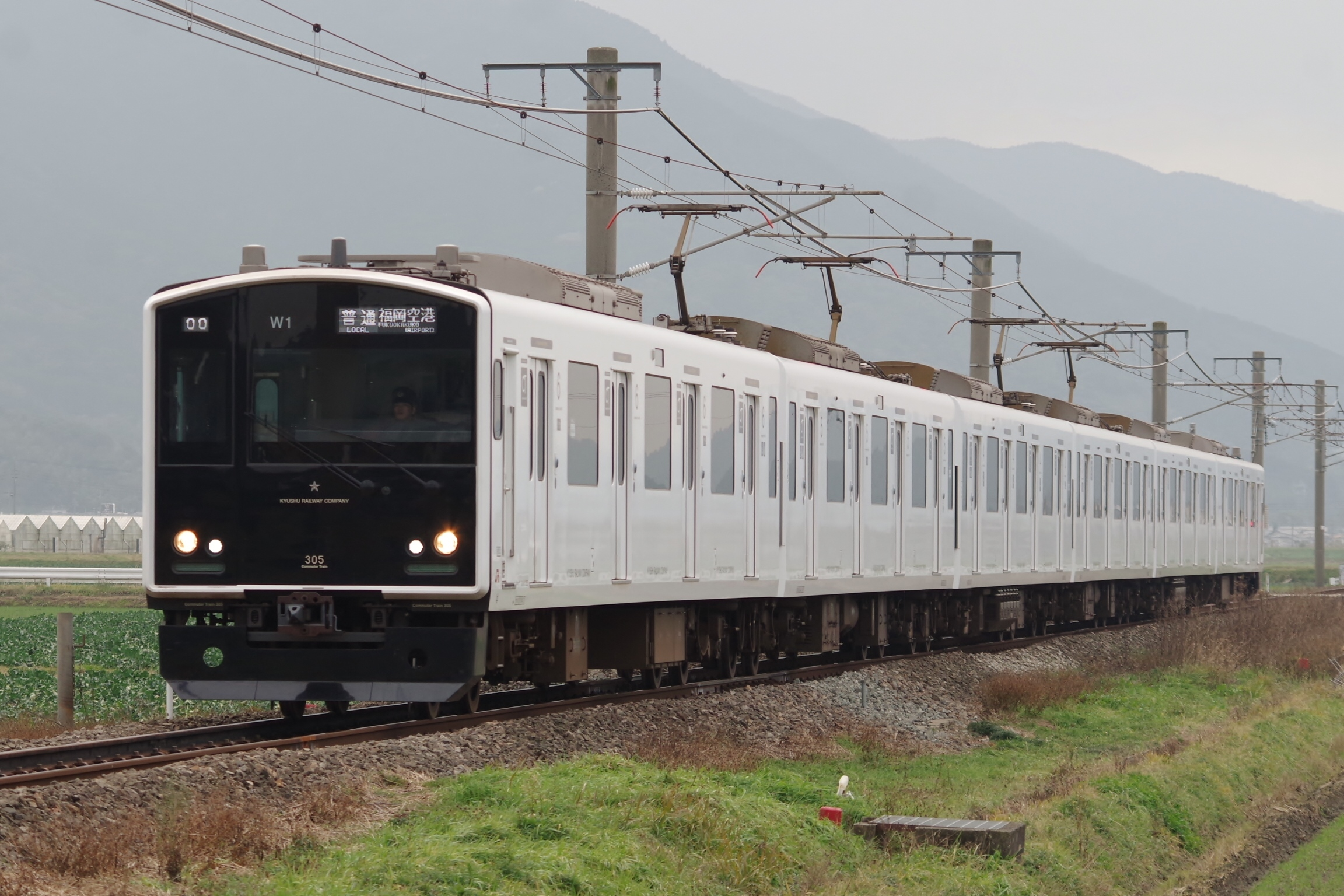
A JR Kyushu 305 series EMU in January 2016

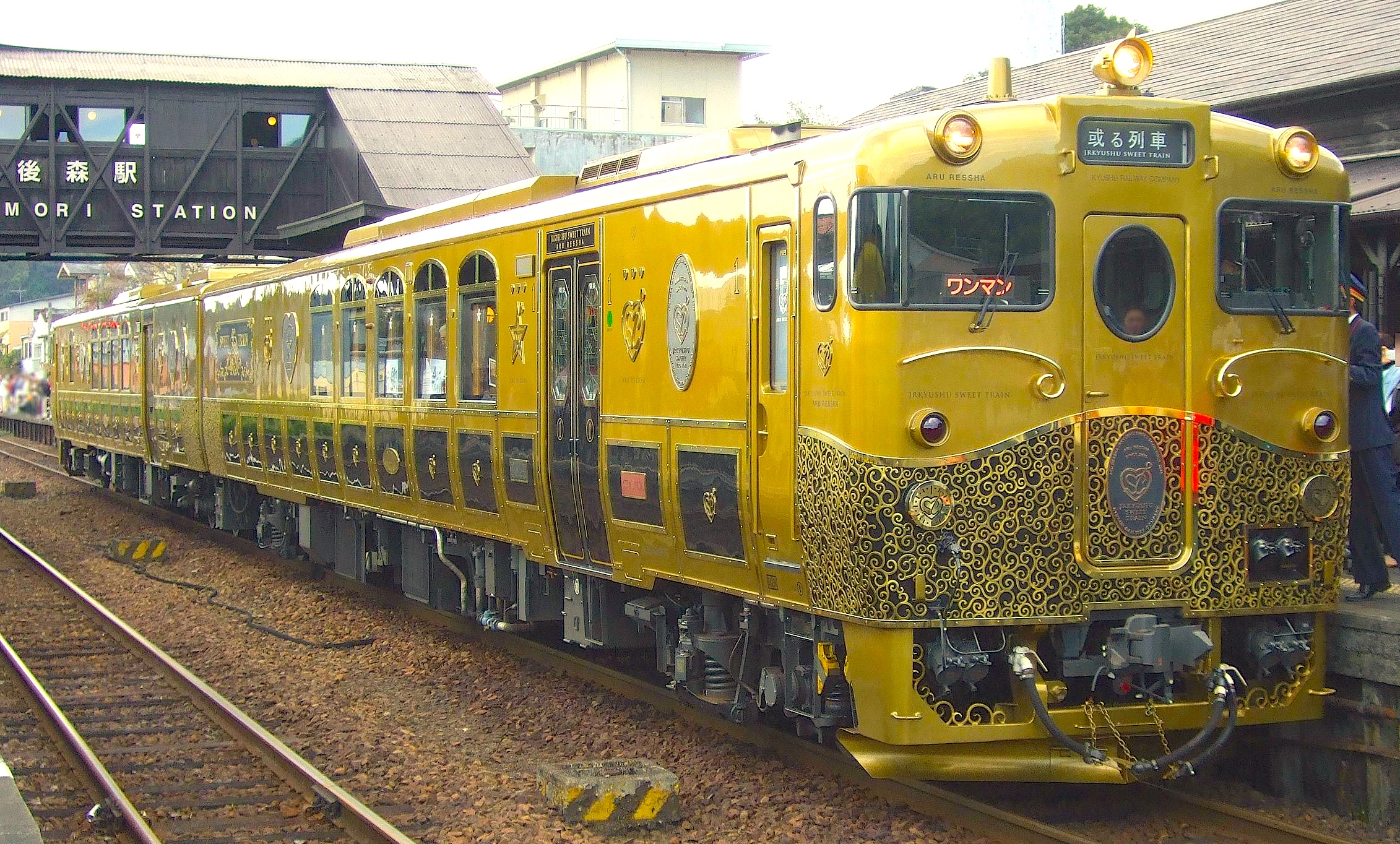
The JR Kyushu KiHa 40 Aru Ressha trainset in October 2015

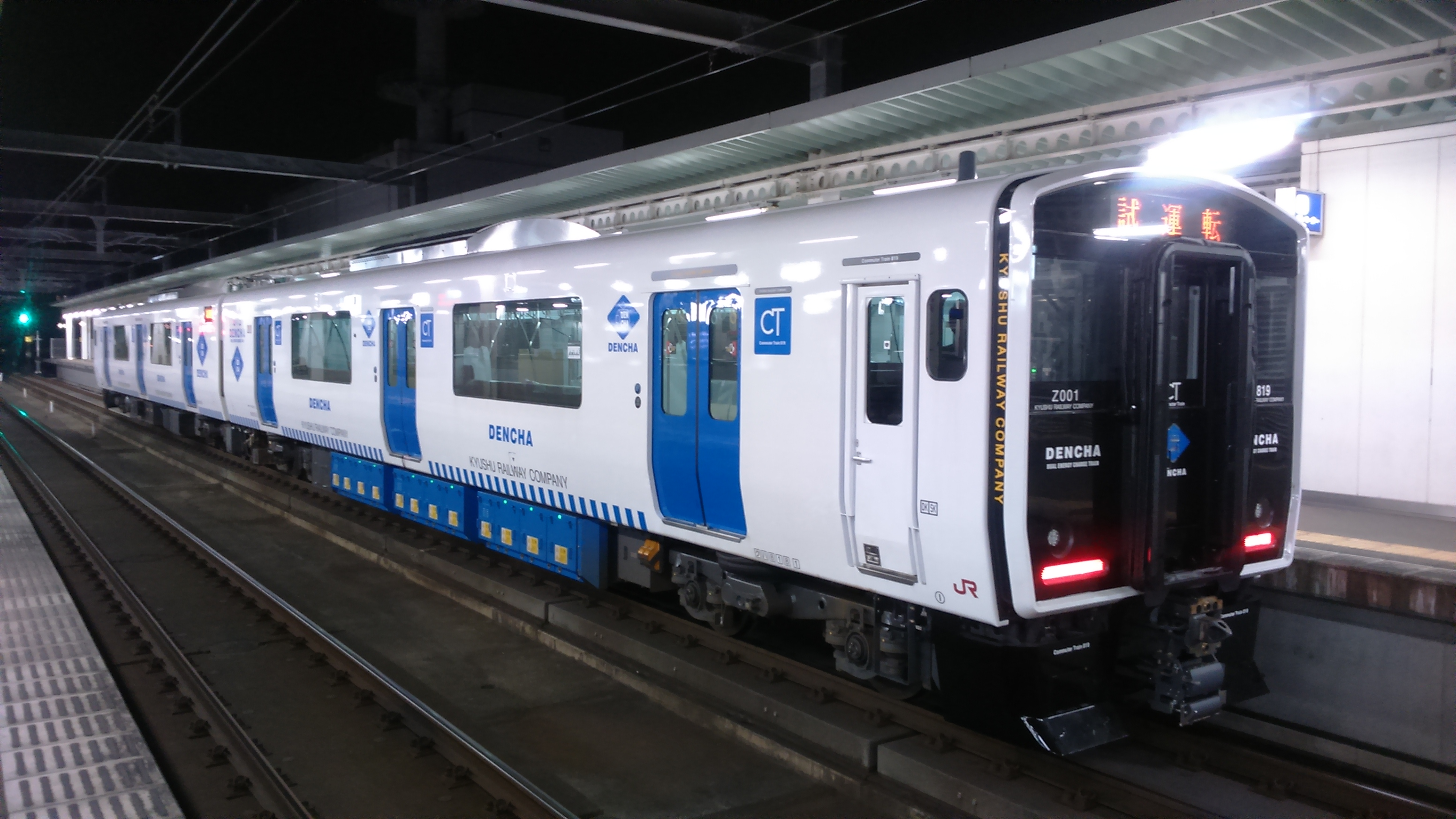
The JR Kyushu BEC819 series battery EMU train in June 2016

=== Fujikyu projects ===
- Fujikyu 1200 series Fuji Tozan Densha train refurbishment, 2009
- Fujikyuko Line Shimoyoshida Station renovation, 2009
- Fujikyuko Line Fujisan Station renovation, 2011
- Fujikyu 6000 series electric multiple unit (in service from February 2012)
- Fujikyu 8500 series Fujisan View Express train refurbishment, entering service in April 2016
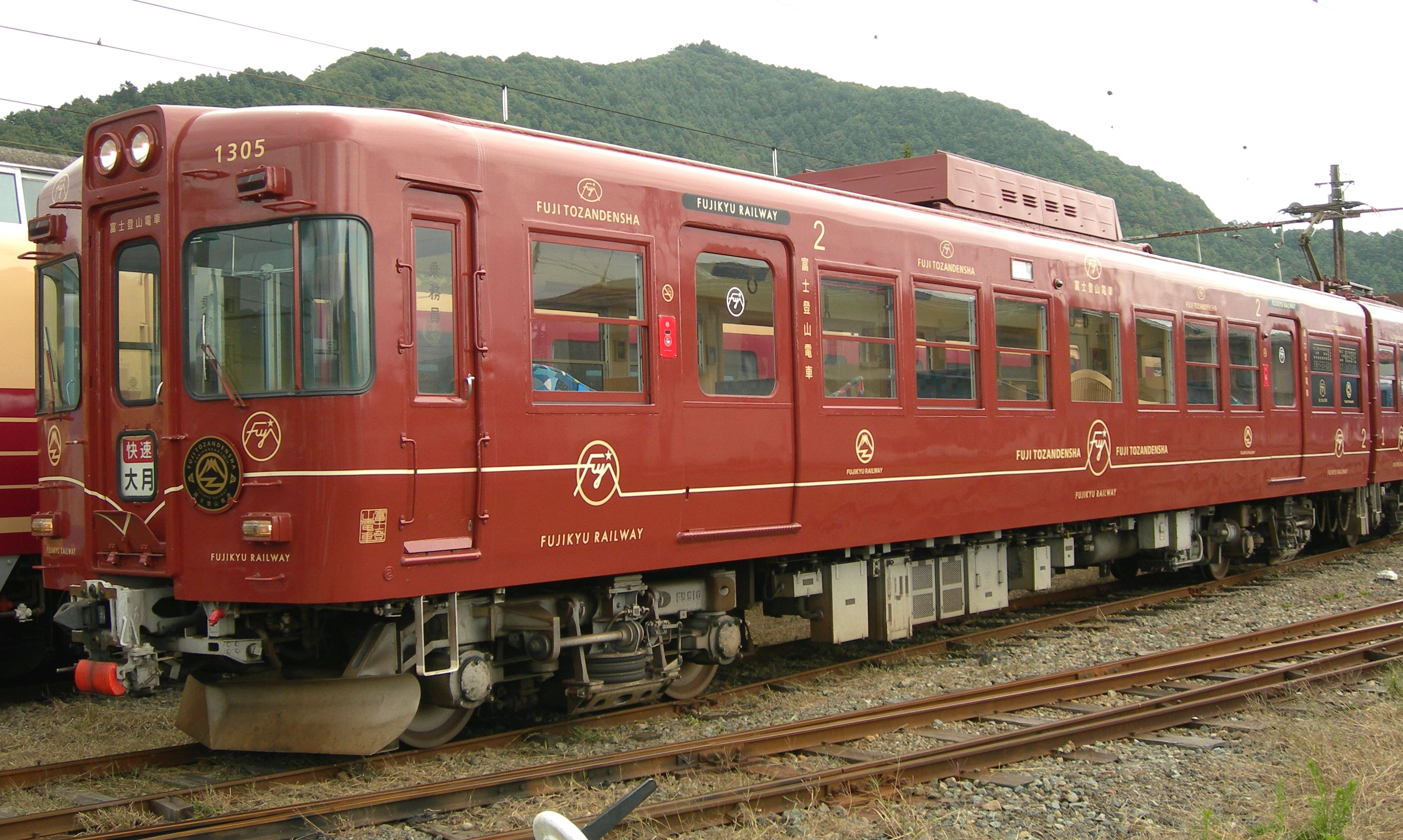
Fujikyu 1200 series Fuji Tozan Densha EMU in October 2010

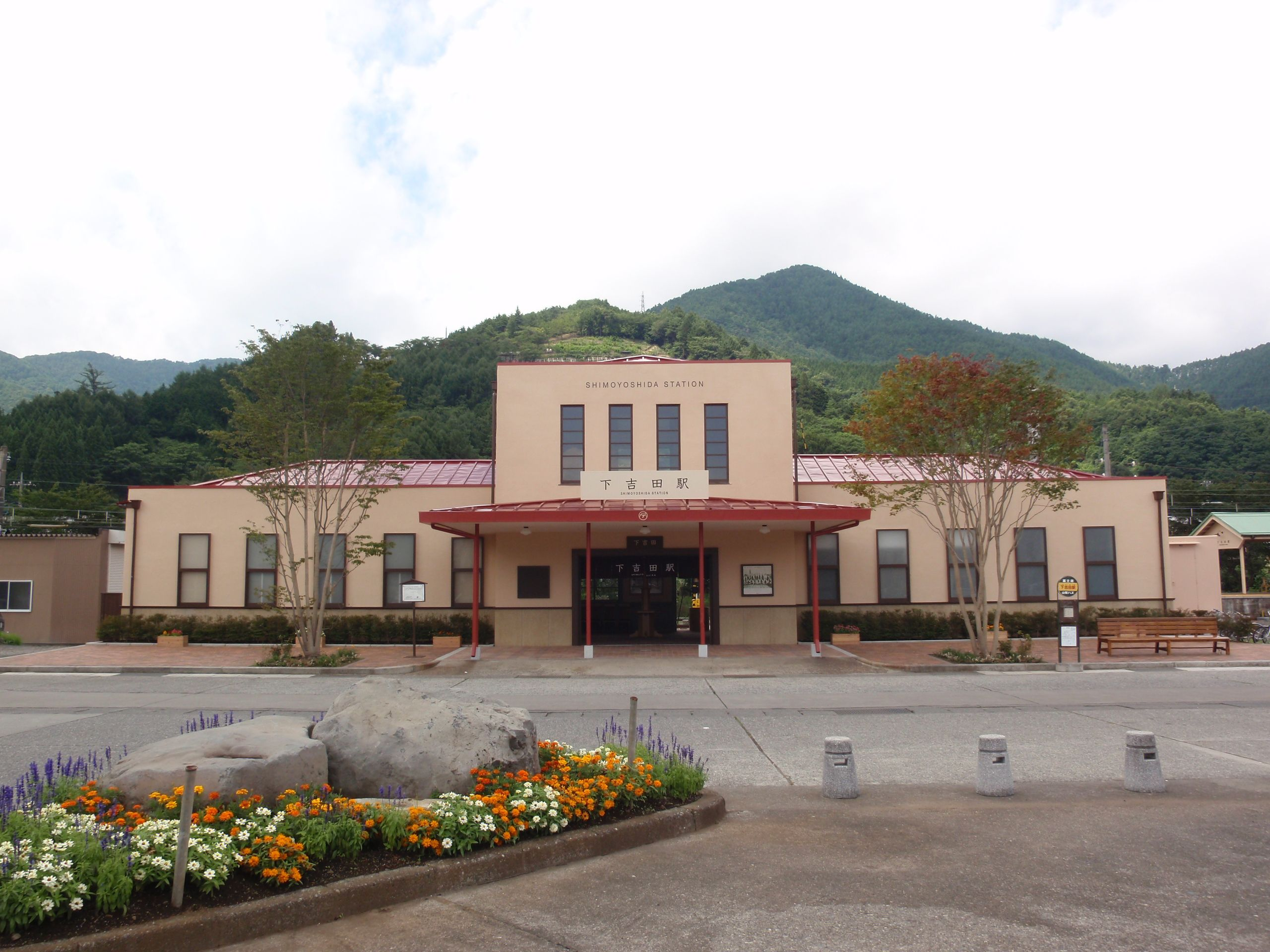
Renovated Shimoyoshida Station on the Fujikyuko Line in August 2009

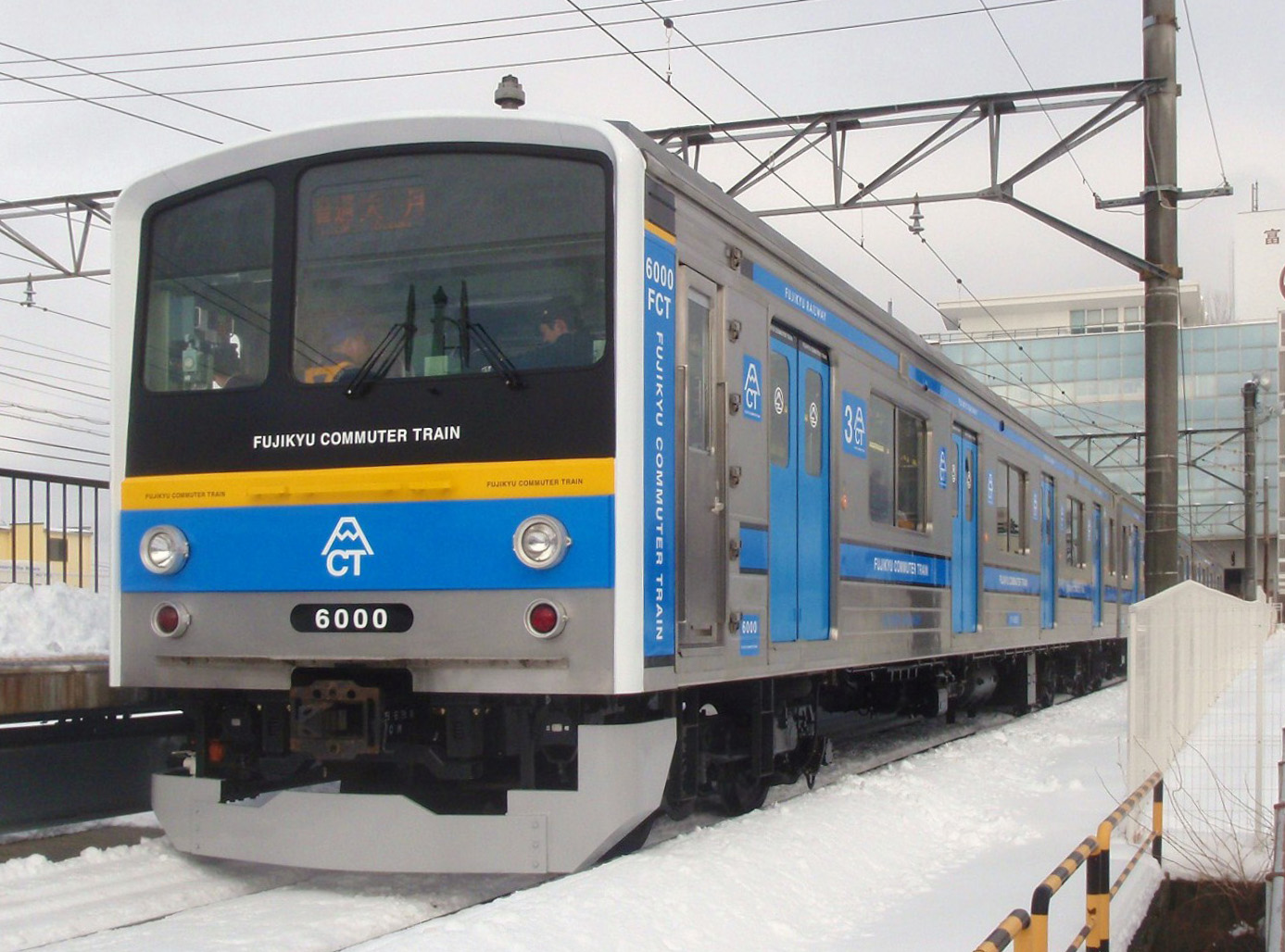
A Fujikyu 6000 series electric multiple unit

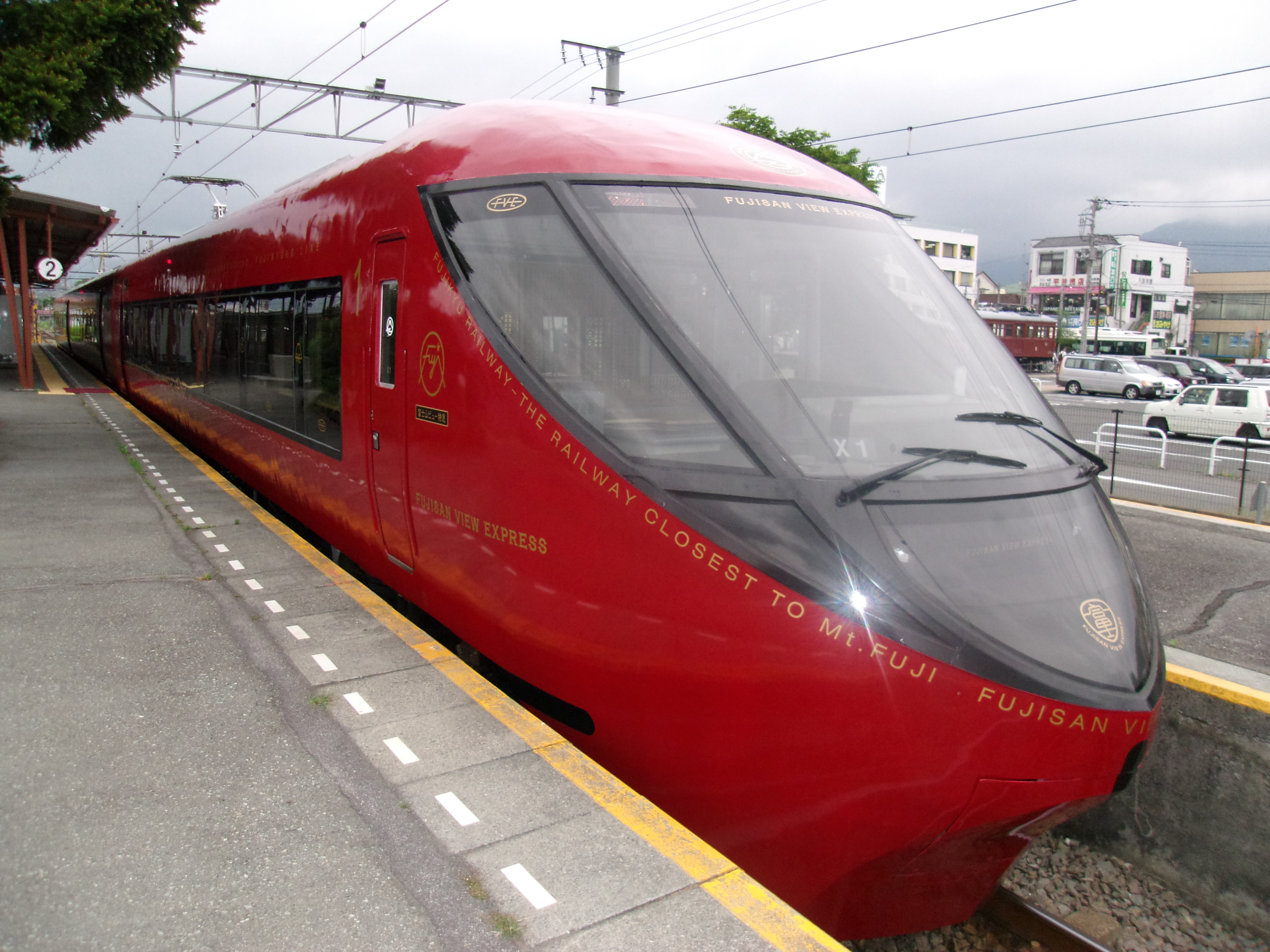
The Fujikyu 8500 series electric multiple unit train in June 2016

=== Other railway projects ===
- Wakayama Electric Railway Kishigawa Line train refurbishment (from March 2006)
- Okayama Electric Tramway Momo tramcar
- Hisatsu Orange Railway Orange Restaurant Express tourist train (in service from March 2013)
- Kitakinki Tango Railway: Refurbishment of two KTR700 diesel cars (Akamatsu and Aomatsu) re-entering service from March 2013, at a cost of approximately 40 million yen
- Kumagawa Railroad Yunomae Line: Five diesel cars to be delivered in fiscal 2013 and 2014
- JR Shikoku Shiman Torocco (しまんトロッコ) train refurbishment, returning to service from 5 October 2013
- Kitakinki Tango Railway: Refurbishment of KTR800 diesel car KTR803, re-entering service from 1 November 2013
- Shinano Railway: 115 series Rokumon tourist train conversion
- Kyoto Tango Railway: Rebuilding two two-car KTR8000 Tango Discovery DMU sets to be renamed Tango no Umi during fiscal 2015
- Nagaragawa Railway: Rebuilding two Nagara 300 series diesel cars to become the Nagara sightseeing train, entering service in spring 2016
- Izukyu Corporation: Rebuilding of Alpha Resort 21 train to become The Royal Express sightseeing train, entering service in summer 2017
- Coto Coto Train: touristic train service run by the Heisei Chikuhō Railway Company in the Fukuoka Prefecture, opened in 2019.
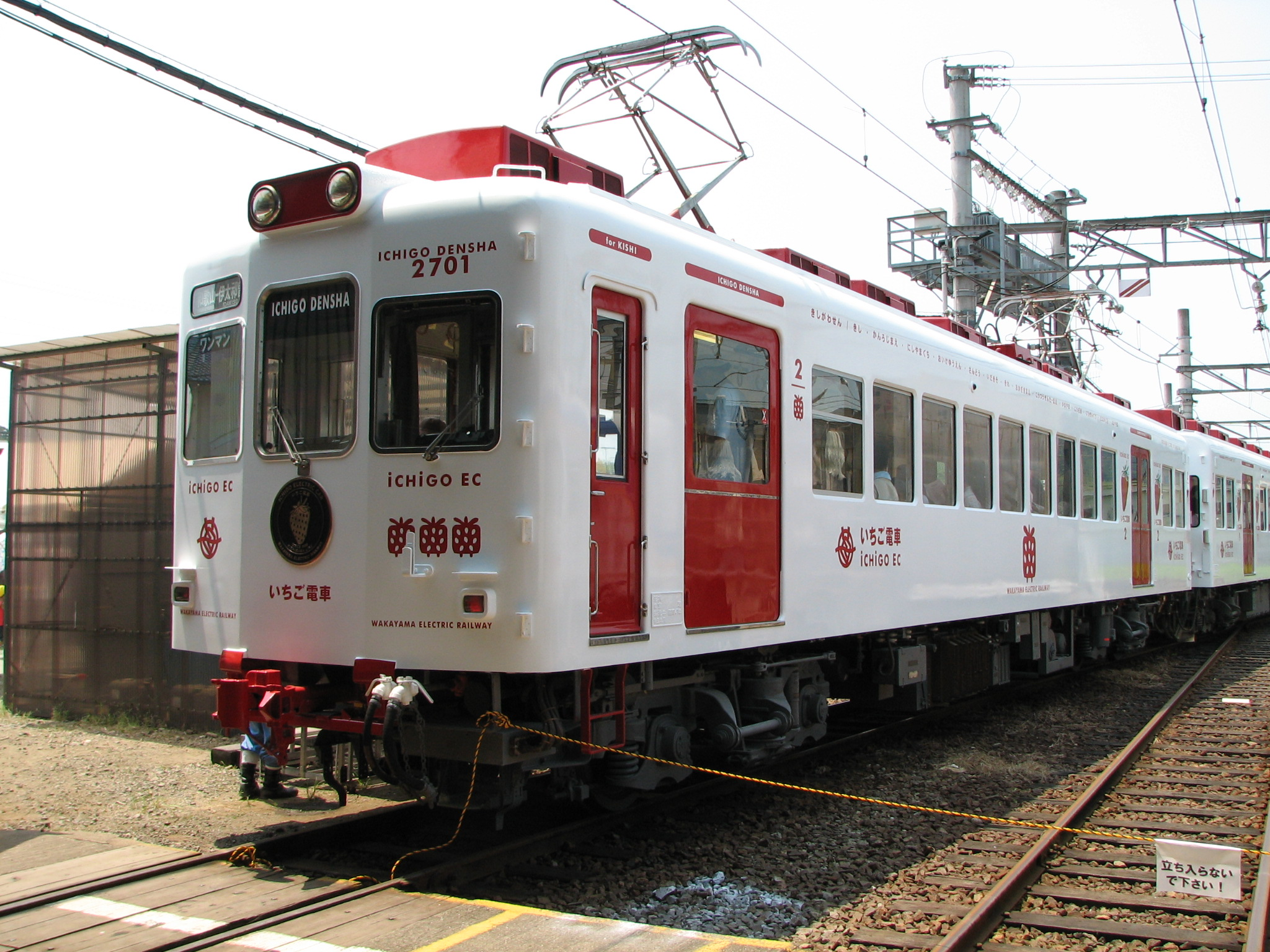
"Ichigo Electric Car" on the Wakayama Electric Railway Kishigawa Line, 2006

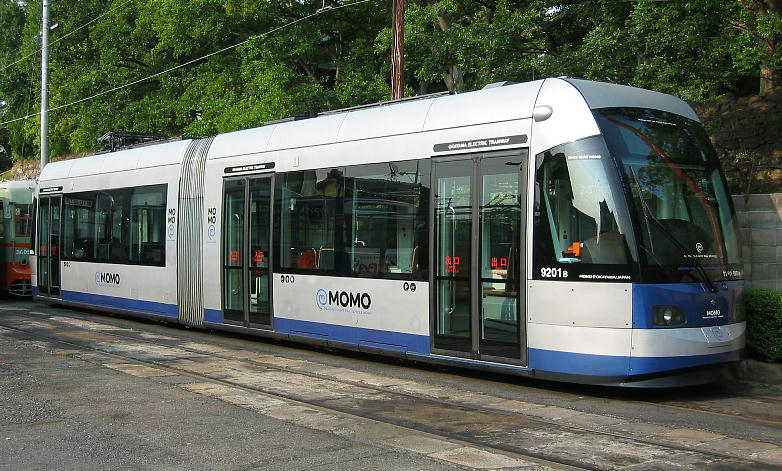
Okayama Tramway 9200 series "Momo" tramcar

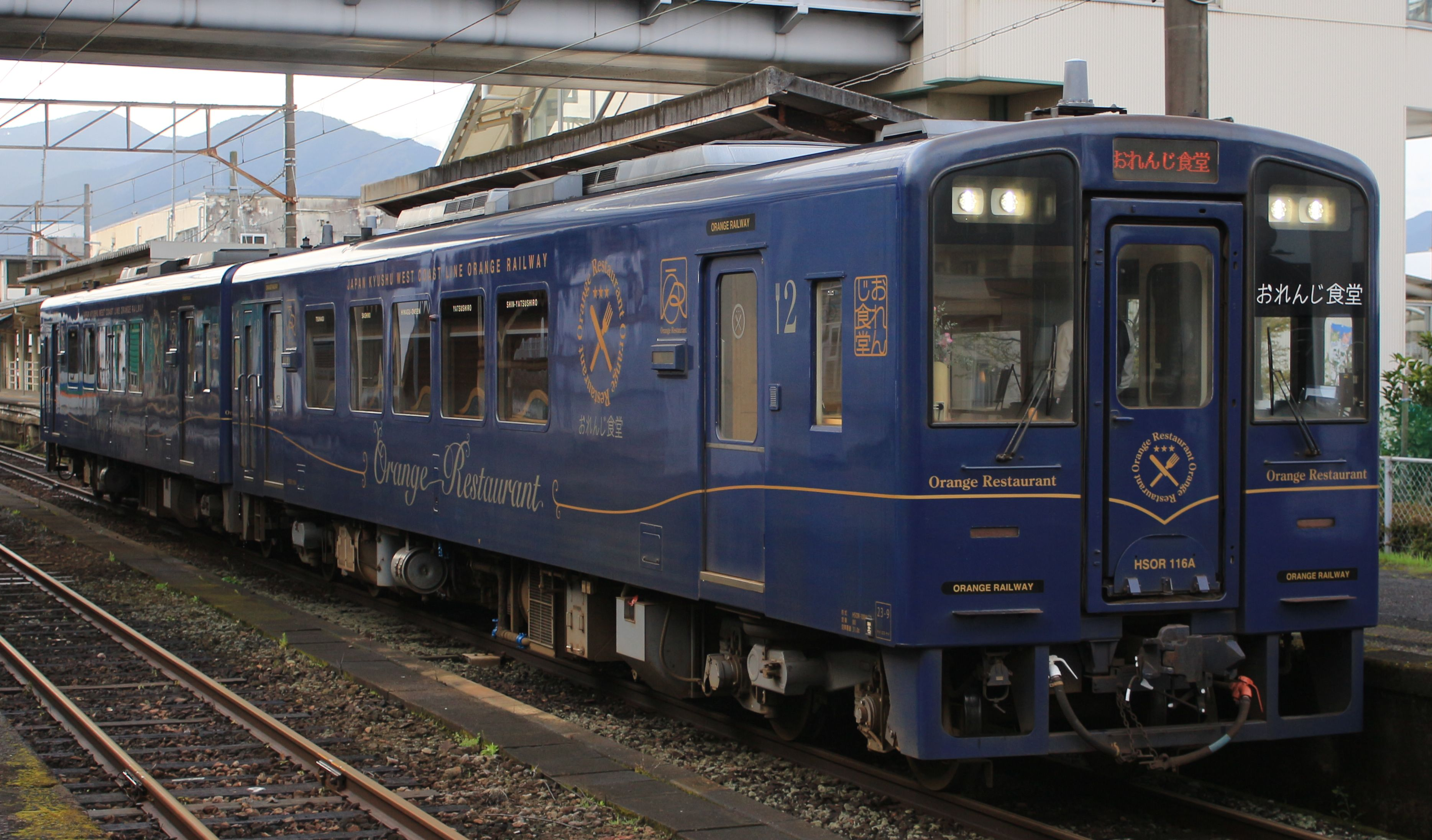
The Hisatsu Orange Railway Orange Restaurant Express tourist train in July 2013

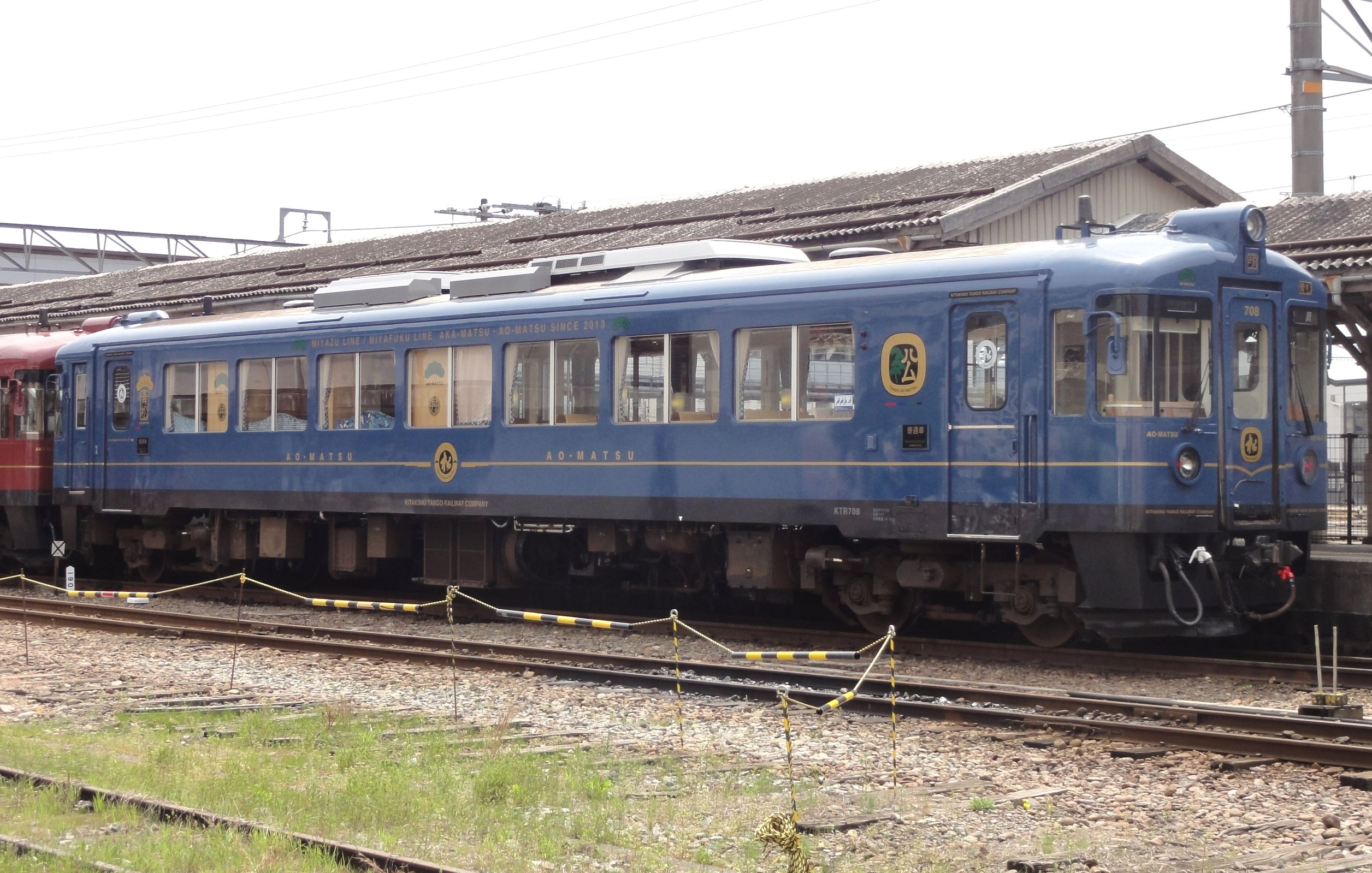
Kitakinki Tango Railway diesel car 708, Aomatsu, April 2013

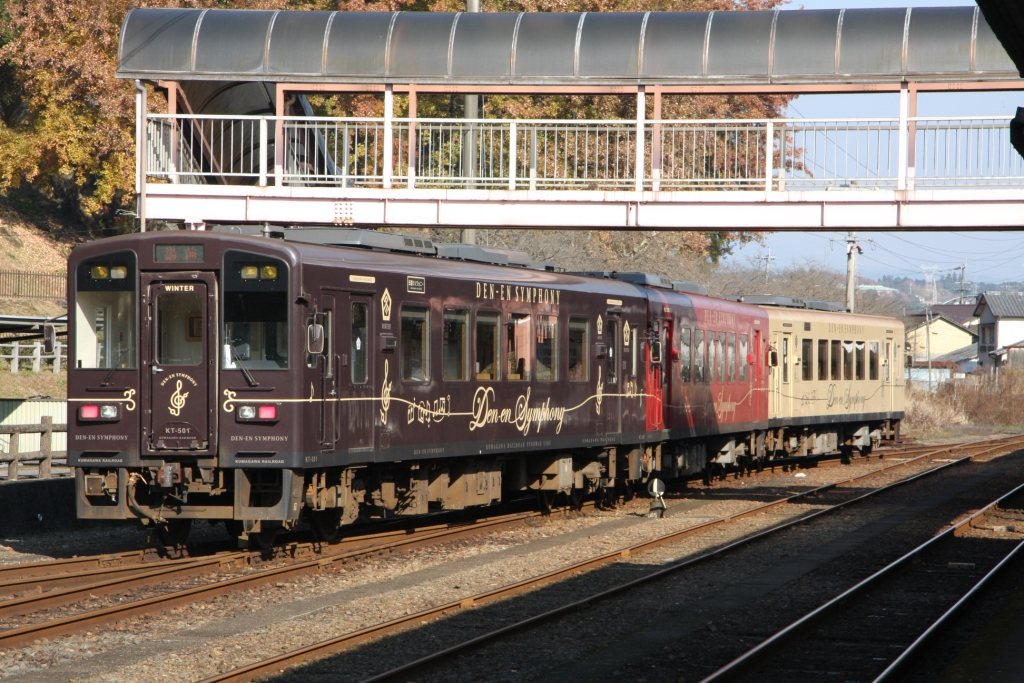
Kumagawa Railroad diesel cars KT501 to KT503 in December 2014

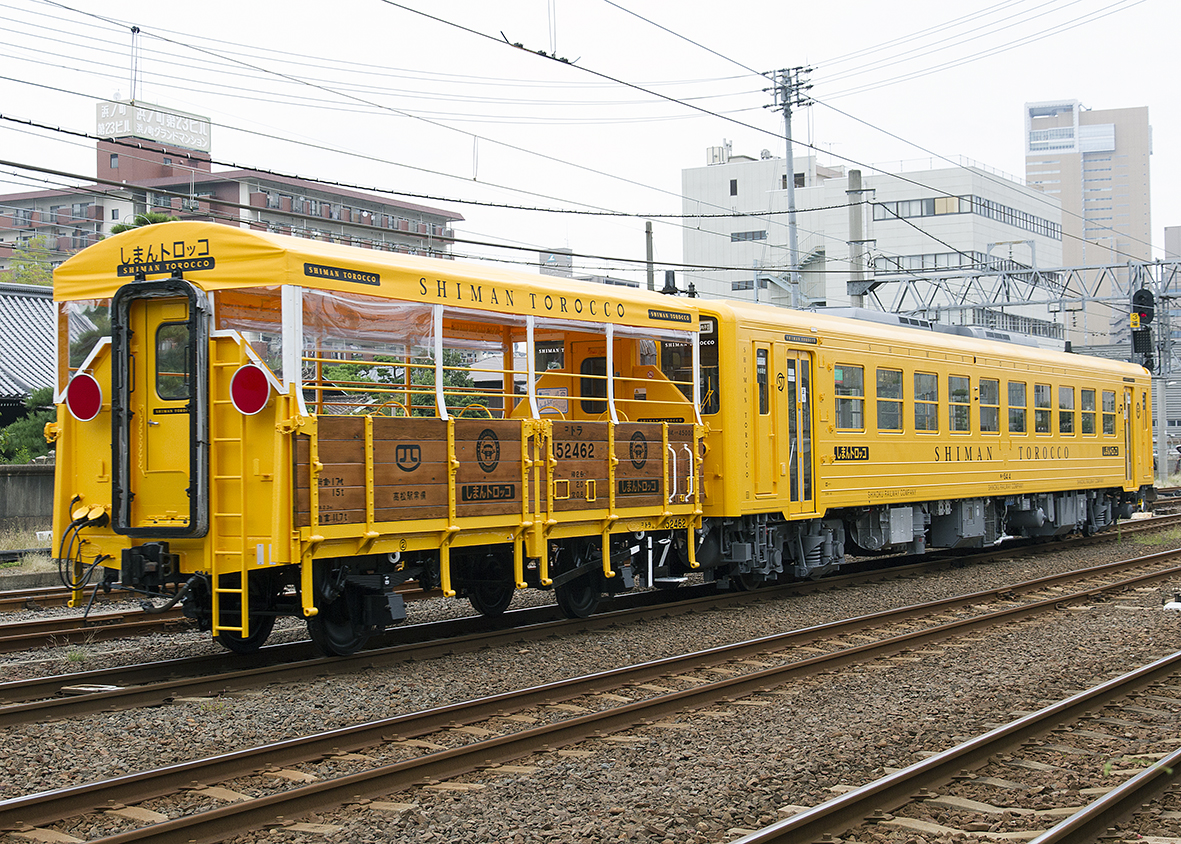
JR Shikoku Shiman Torocco, October 2013

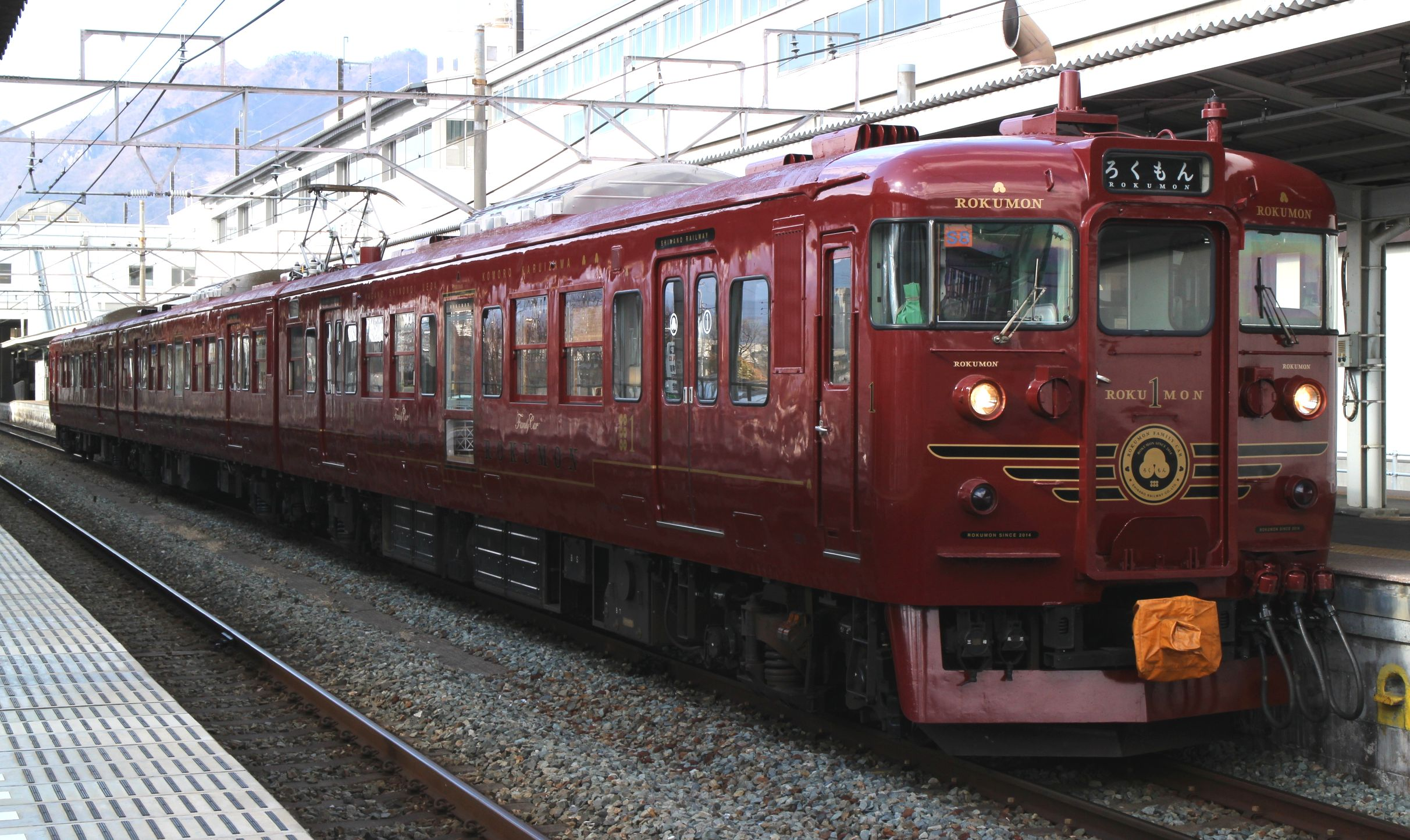
Shinano Railway Rokumon 115 series EMU in February 2015

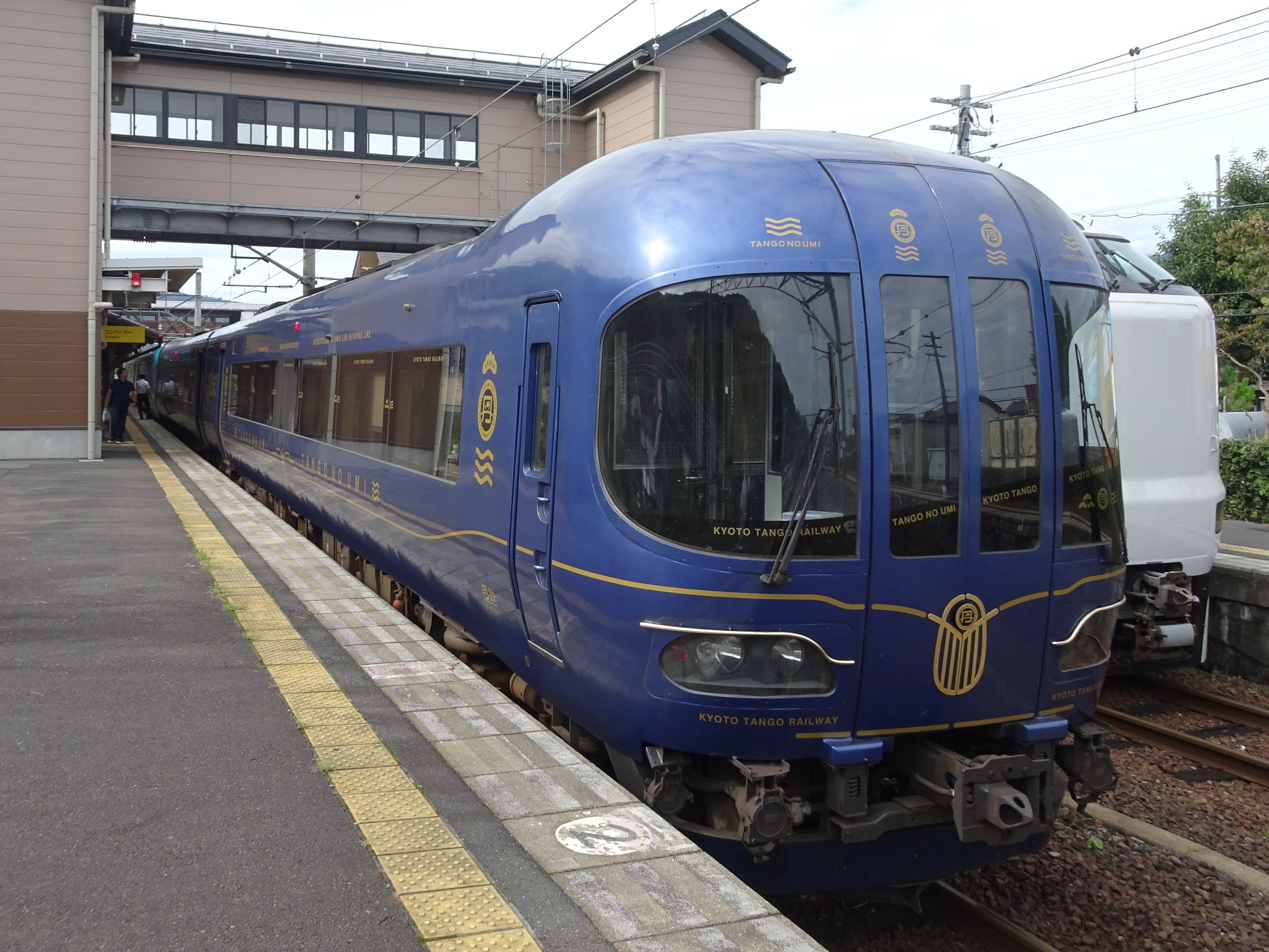
Kyoto Tango Railway KTR8000 Tango no Umi DMU in October 2016

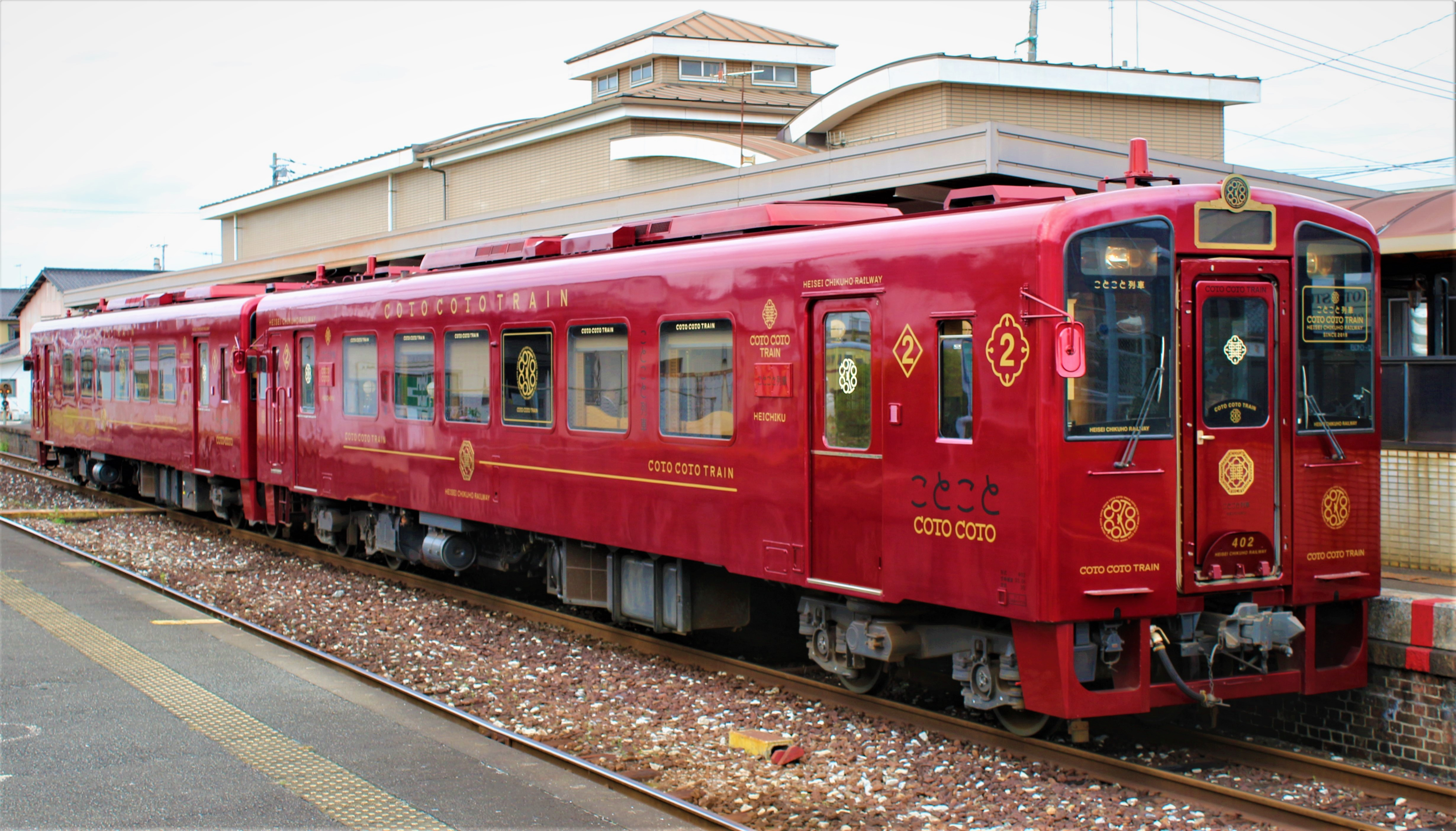
Coto Coto Train of the Heisei Chikuhō Railway Company, 2019

== Exhibitions ==
- Eiji Mitooka Great Railway Era Exhibition: From Ekiben to Shinkansen (水戸岡鋭治の大鉄道時代展 駅弁から新幹線まで) Axis Gallery, Tokyo, 8–23 October 2011
- Eiji Mitooka Railway Design Exhibition: From Ekiben to Shinkansen (水戸岡鋭治の鉄道デザイン展 駅弁から新幹線まで) Art Tower Mito Contemporary Gallery, 7 July - 30 September 2012

== Bibliography ==
- Mitooka, Eiji (September 1987). Perfect Presentation: Illustration + Perspective in Pantone Colors. Graphic-sha. p. 160. ISBN 4-7661-0435-8.
- Mitooka, Eiji (1985). Airbrushing in rendering. Van Nostrand Reinhold. p. 133. ISBN 978-0442260828.
- Mitooka, Eiji (21 December 2004). ぼくは「つばめ」のデザイナー―九州新幹線800系誕生物語 [Tsubame 800 Kyushu Shinkansen Design Story]. Kodansha. p. 155. ISBN 978-4062125321.
- Mitooka, Eiji (6 June 2007). 旅するデザイン 鉄道でめぐる九州 水戸岡鋭治のデザイン画集 [Around The Kyushu]. Shogakukan. p. 145. ISBN 978-4096820124.
- Mitooka, Eiji (1 August 2009). 水戸岡鋭治の「正しい」鉄道デザイン―私はなぜ九州新幹線に金箔を貼ったのか? [Eiji Mitooka's "Correct" Railway Design - Why I Applied Gold Leaf to the Kyushu Shinkansen]. Kotsu Shimbunsha. p. 198. ISBN 978-4330087092.
- Mitooka, Eiji (11 December 2009). 電車のデザイン [Railway Vehicle Design]. Chuokoron Shinsha. p. 205. ISBN 978-4121503367.
