= Japanese submarine chaser Cha-216 =

History

Imperial Japanese Navy
- Name: Cha-216
- Builder: Hayashi Kane Heavy Industries, Shimonoseki
- Launched: 11 March 1944
- Completed: 13 September 1944
- Commissioned: 13 September 1944
- Stricken: 30 April 1945
- Home port: Takao
- Fate: Sunk by aircraft, 9 January 1945

General characteristics
- Class & type: No.1-class Submarine chaser
- Displacement: 130 long tons (132 t) standard
- Length: 29.20 m (95 ft 10 in) overall
- Beam: 5.65 m (18 ft 6 in)
- Draught: 1.97 m (6 ft 6 in)
- Propulsion: 1 × intermediate diesel; shingle shaft, 400 bhp
- Speed: 11.0 knots (12.7 mph; 20.4 km/h)
- Range: 1,000 nmi (1,900 km) at 10.0 kn (11.5 mph; 18.5 km/h)
- Complement: 32
- Armament: 1 × 7.7 mm machine gun; 22 × depth charges; 1 × dunking hydrophone; 1 × simple sonar; From mid 1943, the 7.7 mm machine gun was replaced with a 13.2mm machine gun

Cha-216 or No. 216 (Japanese: 第二百十六號驅潜特務艇) was a No.1-class auxiliary submarine chaser of the Imperial Japanese Navy that served during World War II.

== History ==
She was laid down at the Shimonoseki shipyard of the Hayashi Kane Heavy Industries (林兼重工業株式會社 - now known as Hayashi Kanesen Co., Ltd jp:林兼造船) and launched on 11 March 1944. She was completed and commissioned on 13 September 1944 and assigned to the Mako Guard District operating out of Takao. She conducted patrol, escort, and minesweeping duties between Kagoshima, Chiringashima, Koniya (jp:古仁屋), and Keelung.

On 28 October 1944, she served as an escort of convoy KATA-916 along with a Type D escort ship (CD-30), a Chidori-class torpedo boat (Manazuru), a No.28-class submarine chaser (CH-49), a W-13-class minesweeper (W-15), 3 auxiliary minesweepers (Himeshima Maru, Shonan Maru No. 16, Toshi Maru No. 7), 3 auxiliary subchasers (Showa Maru, Cha-228, Cha-235), 3 auxiliaries (Kiyo Maru, Kochi Maru, Aikawa Maru), and an auxiliary netlayer (Kiri Maru No. 1 Go) for 13 transport/cargo ships (Tensho Maru, Amakusa Maru, Shinton Maru, Sanka Maru, Sanjin Maru, Hayama Maru, Torai Maru, Taikyu Maru, Sakishima Maru, Bansei Maru, Choki Maru, Kishin Maru, Kankyo Maru). The convoy moved cautiously from island to island departing from Naha then the Kerama Islands then Miyako-jima and then Iromote-Jima, Yaeyama Islands before finally arriving at Keelung on 1 November 1945.

On 5 January 1945, she left Keelung escorting convoy Kita-9 consisting of 6 transports (Kankyo Maru, Torai Maru, Taiken Maru, Kishen Maru, Yaei Maru No. 10, Banshu Maru No. 31) along with 2 auxiliary netlayers (Choki Maru, Kiri Maru No. 1 Go), and 5 auxiliary subchasers (Showa Maru, Cha-228, Kochi Maru, Kyo Maru, Ayugawa Maru) headed to Kaohsiung. On 6 November 1944, the convoy arrived at Kaohsiung.

On 9 January 1945, she was attacked by planes from Task Force 38 and sunk southwest of Hsinchu, Taiwan. She was removed from the Navy List on 30 April 1945.
