= Hirasaki Shrine =

Japanese Shinto shrine in Ibusuki, Kagoshima, Kyushu

Hirasaki-jinja 枚聞神社
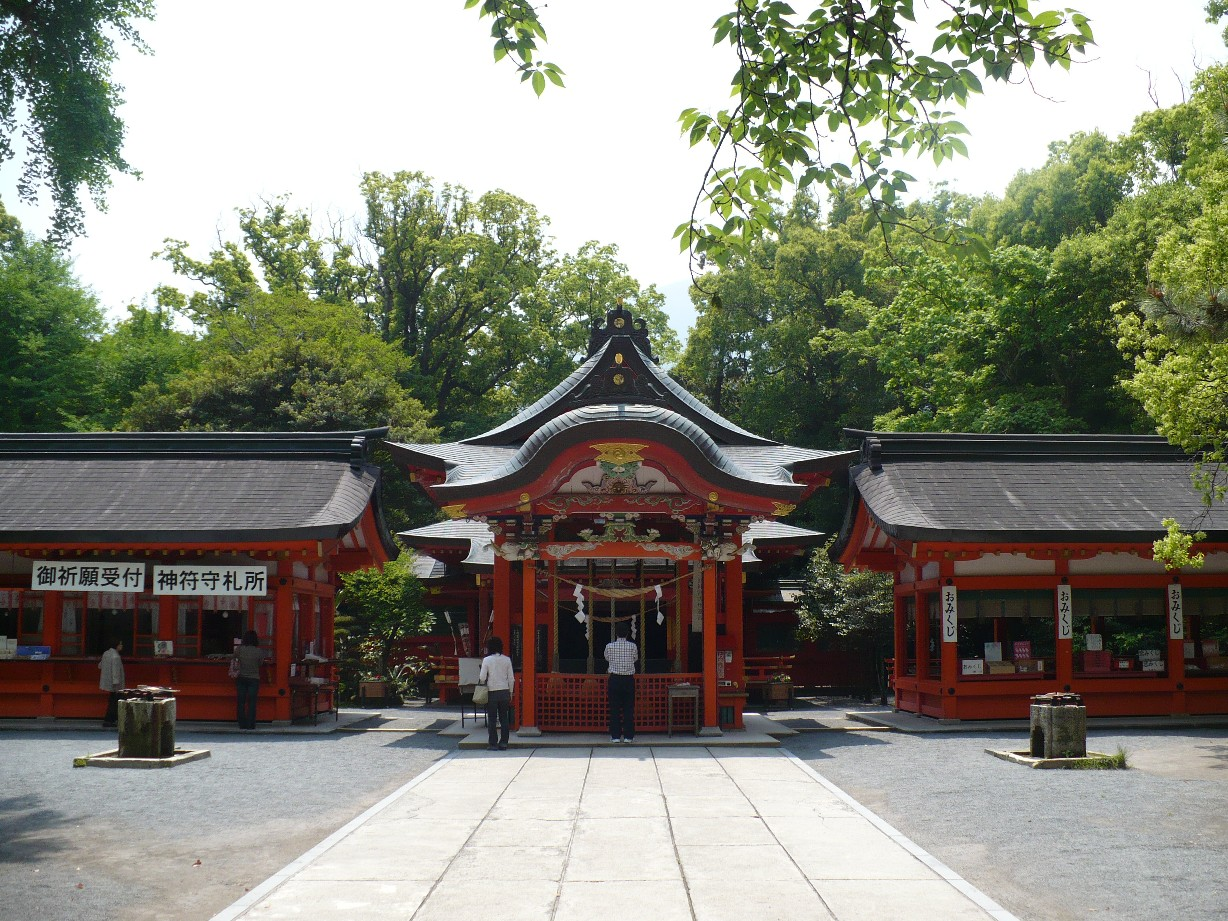
- The honden, or main shrine

- Location within Kagoshima Prefecture Location within Japan

Religion
- Affiliation: Shinto
- Deity: Amaterasu
- Festival: October 14 to 16

Location
- Location: 1366, Kaimonjutcho, Ibusuki-shi, Kagoshima-ken 891-0603
- Interactive map of Hirasaki-jinja 枚聞神社
- Coordinates: 31°12′28″N 130°32′23″E

Architecture
- Established: unknown

Website
- www.ichinomiya.gr.jp/095.html

Hirasaki Shrine (枚聞神社, Hirasaki-jinja), also known as Hirakiki-jinja, is a Shinto shrine in the Kaimonjuttcho neighborhood of the city of Ibusuki in Kagoshima Prefecture, Japan. Along with the Nitta Shrine, it claims the position of ichinomiya of former Satsuma Province. The main festival of the shrine is held annually from October 14 to 16.

== Enshrined kami ==
The kami enshrined at Hirasaki Jinja are:

- Ōhirumenomuchi-no-Mikoto (大日孁貴命), who is identified as Amaterasu
- Go-o San-ji shin (五男三女神), five male and three creator kami listed in the Kojiki

== History ==
The origins of Hirasaka Jinja are unknown. According to the shrine's legend, it was founded in 708 AD, and appears to have originally been based on a mountain cult centered on Mount Kaimon. It is said that it was originally located at the southern foot of Mount Kaimon, but due to an eruption during the Jōgan era (859 - 876), it was moved to its current location at the northern foot of the mountain. The first reliable historical document to mention the shrine is an entry in the "Nihon Sandai Jitsuroku" dated March 20, 860, and in later entries dated April 7, 866 and on October 9, 882. The shrine also appears In the Engishiki Jinmyocho (Divination List of Shrines) of 927, where it is listed as "Hiyaki Jinja". There was considerable variation throughout historical records as to the actual kami venerated at this shrine, with most Muromachi period records stating that it was Watatsumi or Sarutahiko Ōkami and early Meiji period records stating that it was variously Kuni-no-Tokotachi, Toyotama-hime, or Konohanasakuya-hime in addition to the current Amaterasu. Since its location facing the open sea, the shrine has long been worshiped for protection of navigation and in the Edo period, it attracted the reverence of envoys from the Ryukyu Islands.

During the Sengoku period, Hirasaki Shrine was under the protection of the Ei clan, a powerful vassal of the Shimazu clan, but in 1571, the shrine was largely destroyed in an internal conflict between branches of the clan. However, it was soon restored under the protection of the Shimazu clan, who decided their strategy by drawing lots at the shrine. The current shrine building was donated by Shimazu Yoshihiro in 1610 and remodeled by Shimazu Shigehide in 1787.

Since the Kamakura period, the shrine has been in a fierce rivalry with Nitta Shrine (in Satsumasendai) over the position of ichinomiya of Satsuma Province. Nitta Shrine, which was also one of the five branch shrines of Usa Jingū, gradually gained the upper hand, and during the Meiji period era of State Shinto, Nitta Shrine was rated as a National shrine, 2nd rank (国幣中社, Kokuhei Chusha), whereas Hirasaki Shrine was accorded the lower rank of National shrine, 3rd rank (国幣小社, Kokuhei Shosha) under the Modern system of ranked Shinto Shrines.

The shrine is located 800 meters north of Kaimon Station on the JR Kyushu Ibusuki Makurazaki Line

== Cultural Properties ==
=== Important Cultural Properties ===
- Cosmetic box, Pine and plum design' (松梅蒔絵櫛笥) Muromachi period.

=== Kagoshima Prefecture Tangible Cultural Property ===
- Honden' (本殿).

== See also ==
- List of Shinto shrines in Japan
- Modern system of ranked Shinto Shrines
