= Miyagahama Station =

Railway station in Ibusuki, Kagoshima Prefecture, Japan

Miyagahama Station 宮ヶ浜駅
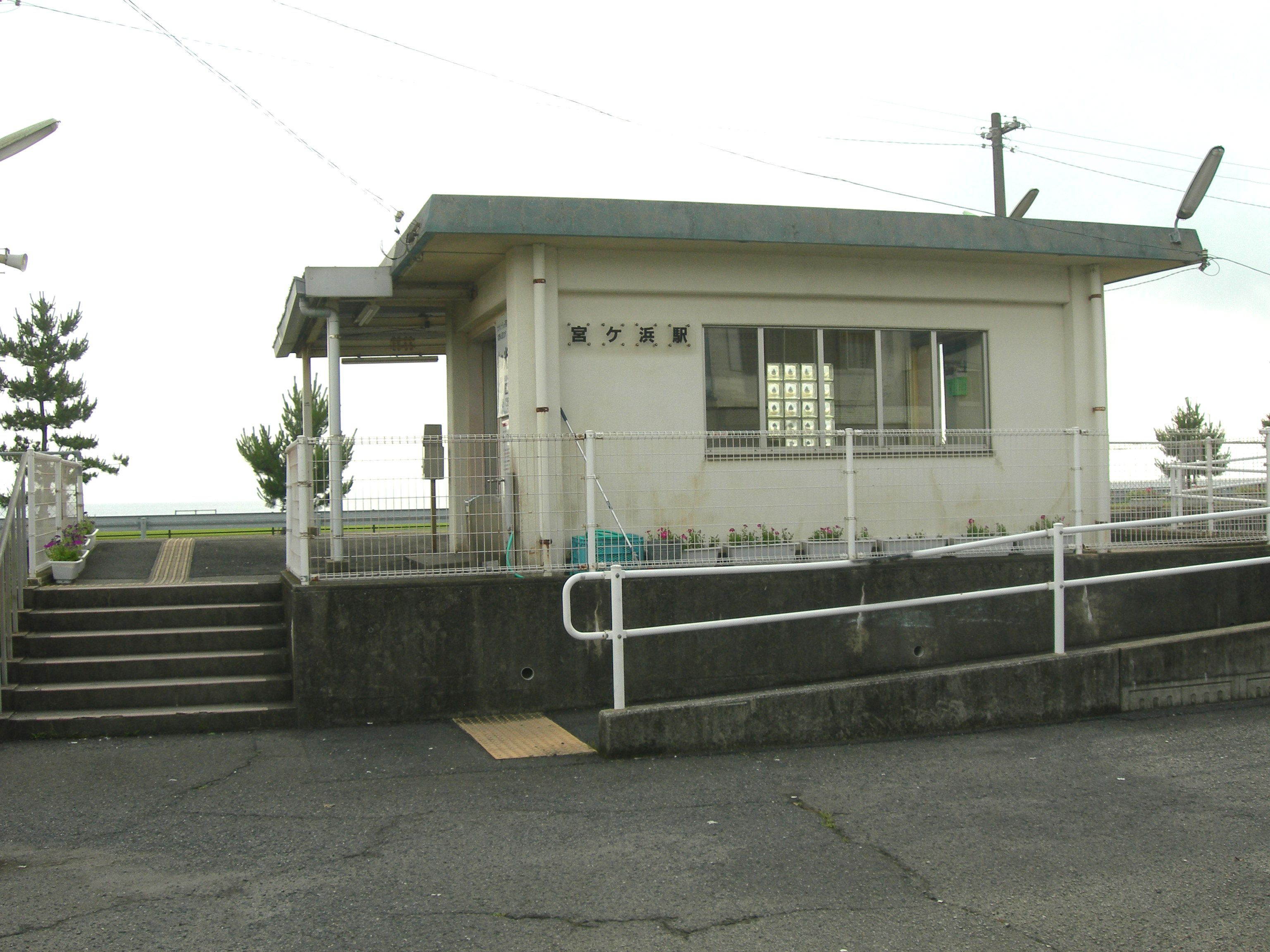
- Miyagahama Station in 2010

General information
- Location: 4672 Nishikata, Ibusuki-shi, Kagoshima-ken 891-0311; Japan
- Coordinates: 31°16′37″N 130°37′12″E
- Operator: JR Kyushu
- Line: ■ Ibusuki Makurazaki Line
- Distance: 40.7 km from Kagoshima-Chūō
- Platforms: 1 side platform

Other information
- Status: Unstaffed
- Website: Official website

History
- Opened: 19 December 1934

Passengers
- FY2015: 13 daily

Services
| Preceding station | JR Kyushu | Following station |
|---|---|---|
| Satsuma-Imaizumi towards Kagoshima-Chūō | Ibusuki Makurazaki Line | Nigatsuden towards Makurazaki |
Location
- Location within Kagoshima Prefecture Location within Japan

Miyagahama Station (宮ヶ浜駅, Miyagahama-eki) is a passenger railway station located in the city of Ibusuki, Kagoshima Prefecture, Japan. It is operated by JR Kyushu.

== Lines ==
The station is served by the Ibusuki Makurazaki Line and is located 40.7 km from the starting point of the line at Kagoshima-Chūō.

== Layout ==
This is an above-ground station with one side platform and one track. It is an unattended station with a small station building.

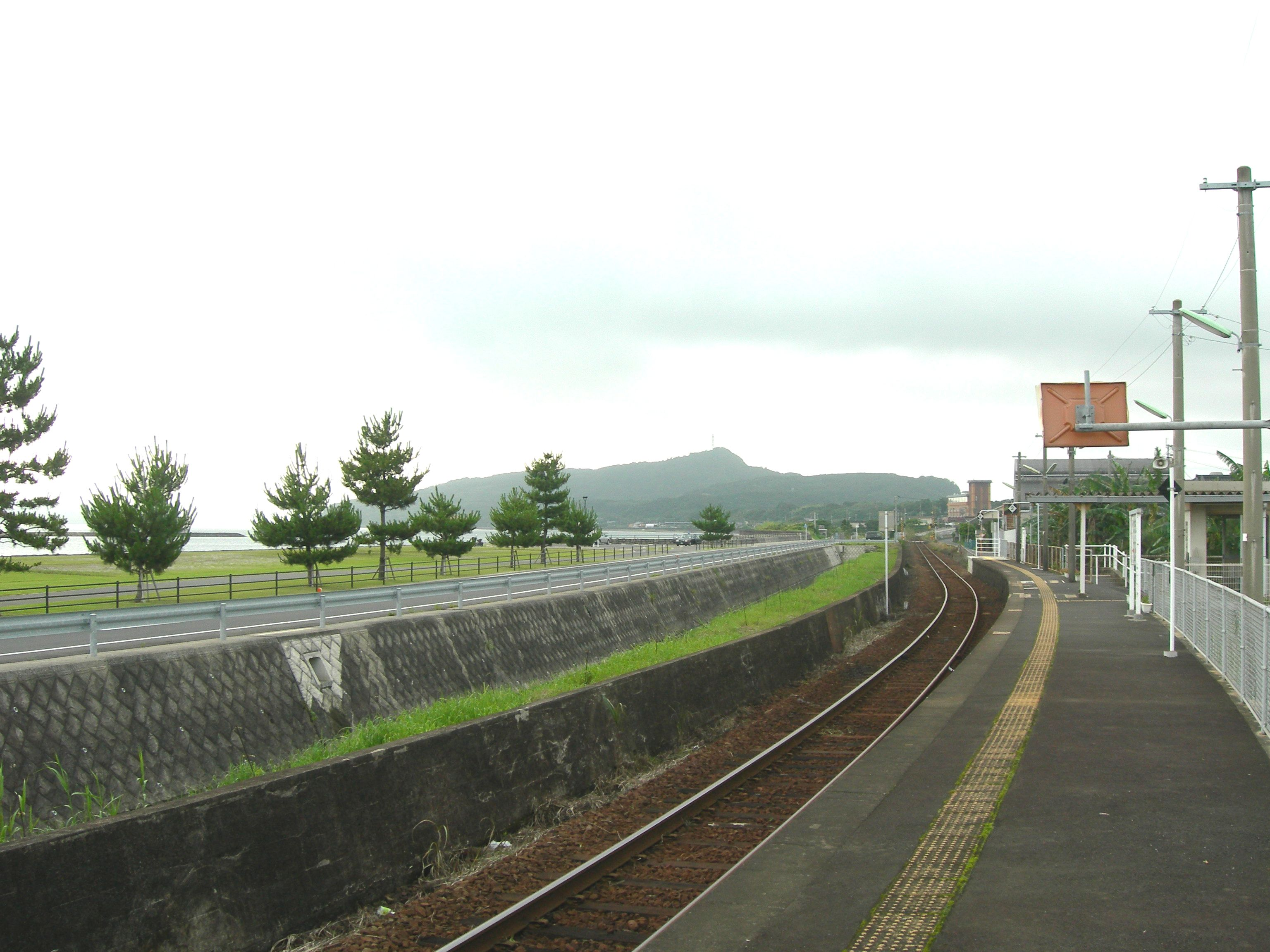
Platform）

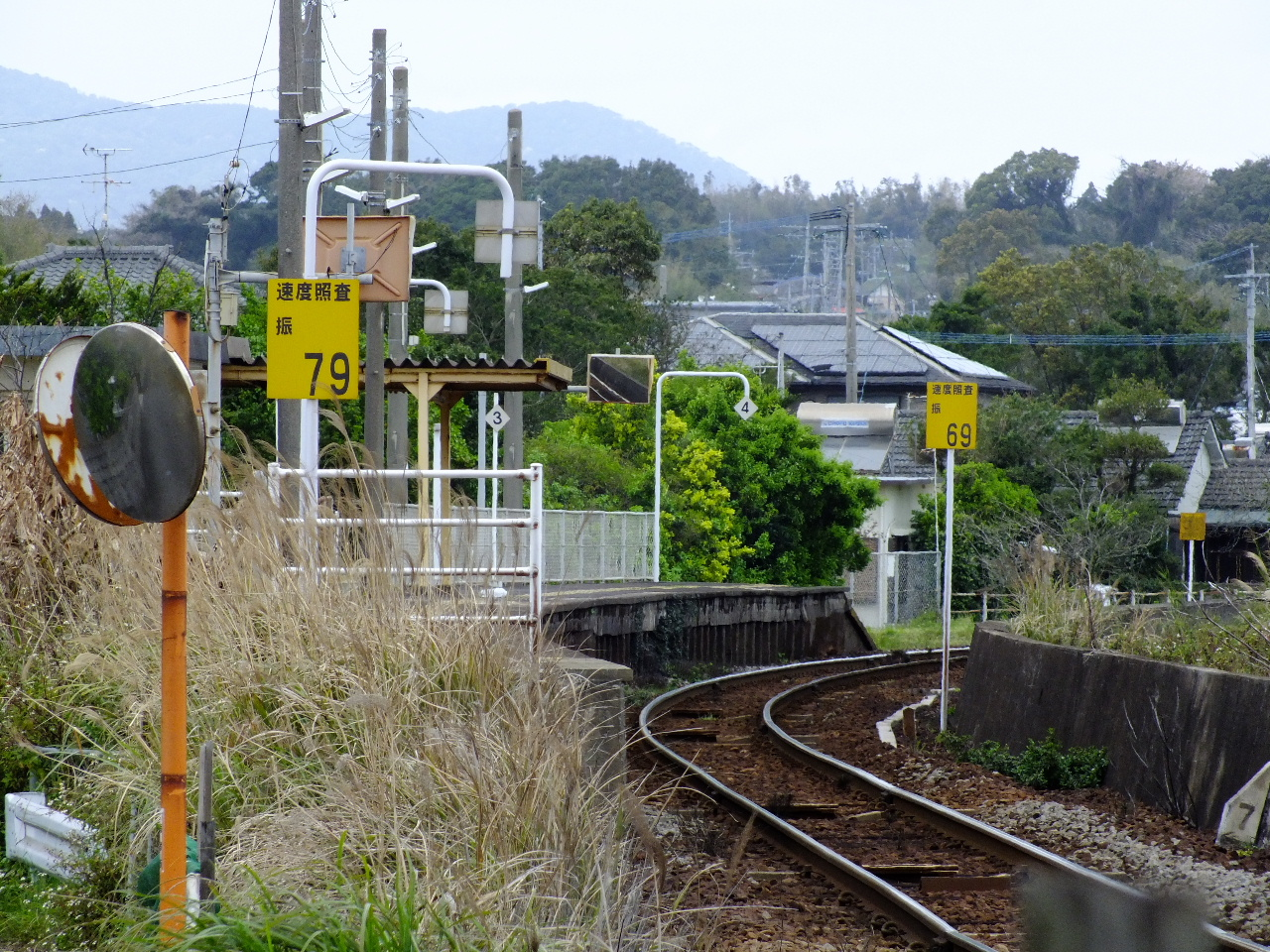
Pendulum car speed control sign (towards Kagoshima Chuo)

== History ==
The station was opened on 19 December 1934 by the Japanese Government Railways (JGR) . On 31 October 1961 with the name of the line is changed to the Ibusuki Makurazaki Line. With the privatization of Japanese National Railways (JNR), the successor of JGR, on 1 April 1987, JR Kyushu took over control of the station.

== Passenger statistics ==
In fiscal 2015, the station was used by an average of 13 passengers daily.

== Surrounding area ==
- Minatogawa Bridge - Completed in 1844

== See also ==
- List of railway stations in Japan
