= Irino Station =

Railway station in Ibusuki, Kagoshima Prefecture, Japan

Irino Station 入野駅
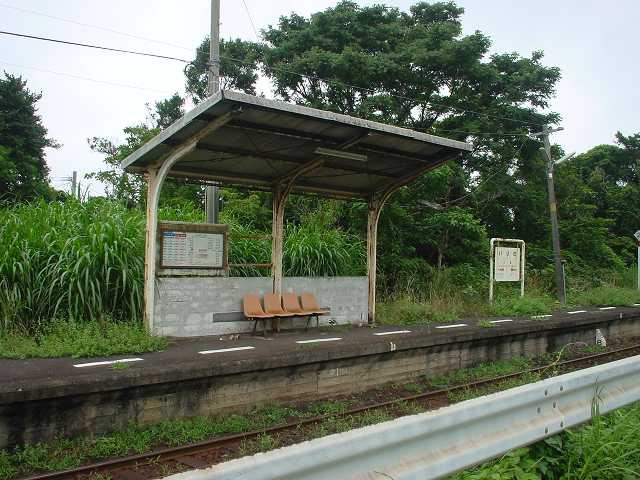
- Irino Station

General information
- Location: Kaimon Jutchō, Ibusuki-shi, Kagoshima-ken 891-0603; Japan
- Coordinates: 31°12′15″N 130°31′7″E
- Operator: JR Kyushu
- Line: ■ Ibusuki Makurazaki Line
- Distance: 62.8 km from Kagoshima-Chūō
- Platforms: 1 side platform

Other information
- Status: Unstaffed
- Website: Official website

History
- Opened: 22 March 1960

Passengers
- FY2015: 13 daily

Services
Preceding station	JR Kyushu	Following station
Kaimon towards Kagoshima-Chūō	Ibusuki Makurazaki Line	Ei towards Makurazaki
Location
- Location within Kagoshima Prefecture Location within Japan

Irino Station (入野駅, Irino-eki) is a passenger railway station located in the city of Ibusuki, Kagoshima Prefecture, Japan. It is operated by JR Kyushu.

== Lines ==
The station is served by the Ibusuki Makurazaki Line and is located 62.8 km from the starting point of the line at Kagoshima-Chūō.

== Layout ==
This is an above-ground station with one side platform and one track. It is an unattended station. The is no station building but only a small short open shelter on the platform.

== History ==
The station was opened on 22 March 1960 as a station on the JNR Ibusuki Line. With the privatization of Japanese National Railways (JNR), the successor of JGR, on 1 April 1987, JR Kyushu took over control of the station.

== Passenger statistics ==
In fiscal 2015, the station was used by an average of 13 passengers daily.

== Surrounding area ==
- Japan National Route 226

== See also ==
- List of railway stations in Japan
