= Nigatsuden Station =

Railway station in Ibusuki, Kagoshima Prefecture, Japan

Nigatsuden Station 二月田駅
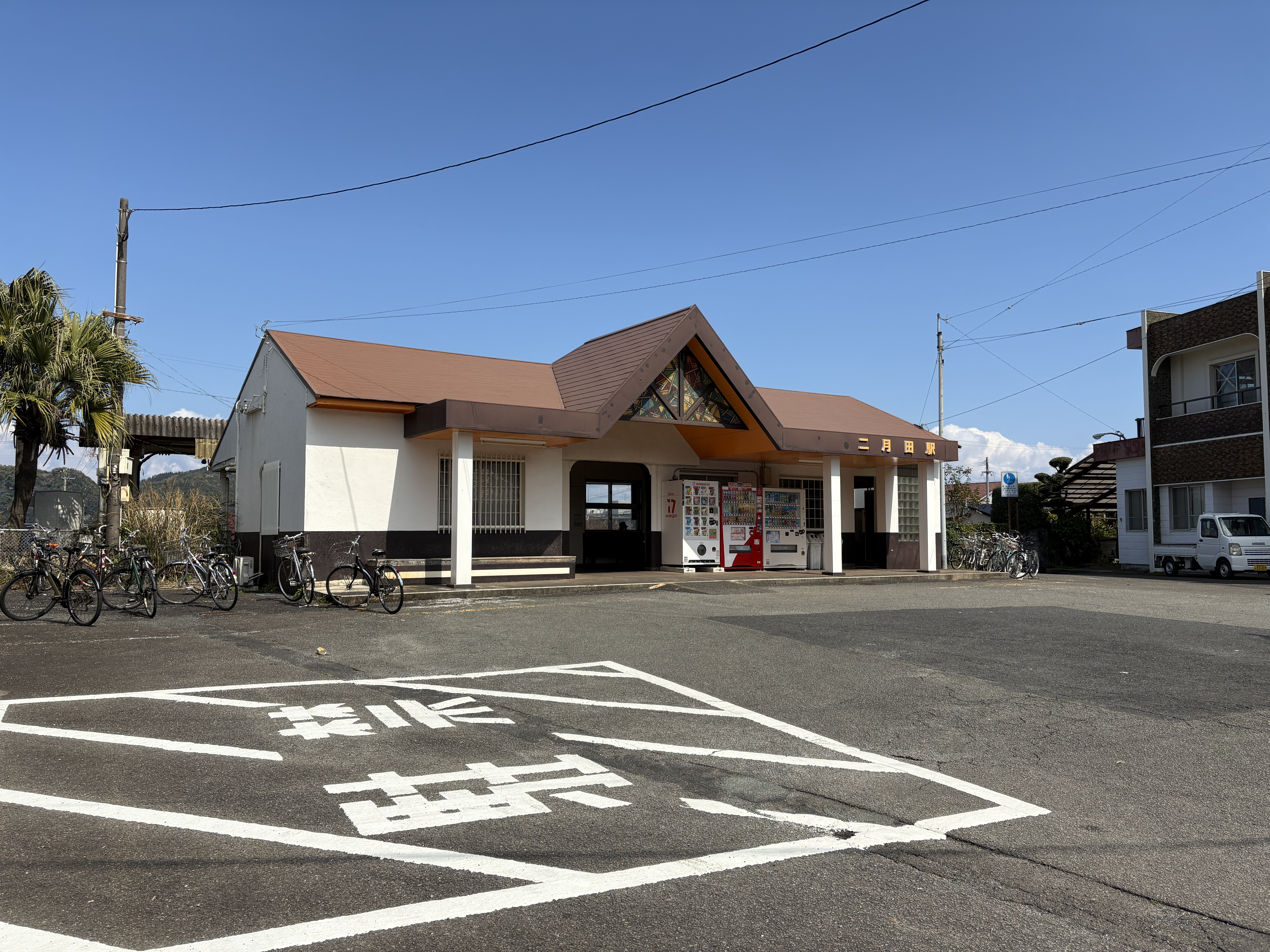
- Nigatsuden Station in 2026

General information
- Location: 147 Jūchō, Ibusuki-shi, Kagoshima-ken 891-0402; Japan
- Coordinates: 31°15′15″N 130°37′48″E
- Operator: JR Kyushu
- Line: ■ Ibusuki Makurazaki Line
- Distance: 43.4 km from Kagoshima-Chūō
- Platforms: 1 side platform

Other information
- Status: Unstaffed
- Website: Official website

History
- Opened: 19 December 1934

Passengers
- FY2020: 318 daily

Services
Preceding station	JR Kyushu	Following station
Miyagahama towards Kagoshima-Chūō	Ibusuki Makurazaki Line	Ibusuki towards Makurazaki
Location
- Location within Kagoshima Prefecture Location within Japan

Nigatsuden Station (二月田駅, Nigatsuden-eki) is a passenger railway station located in the city of Ibusuki, Kagoshima Prefecture, Japan. It is operated by JR Kyushu.

== Lines ==
The station is served by the Ibusuki Makurazaki Line and is located 43.4 km from the starting point of the line at Kagoshima-Chūō.

== Layout ==
This is an above-ground station with one side platform and one track. The wooden station building is old, and some of the six old rails supporting the platform roof are engraved with marks indicating that they were manufactured by Deutsche Krupp (now ThyssenKrupp) in the early 1900s. It is an unattended station

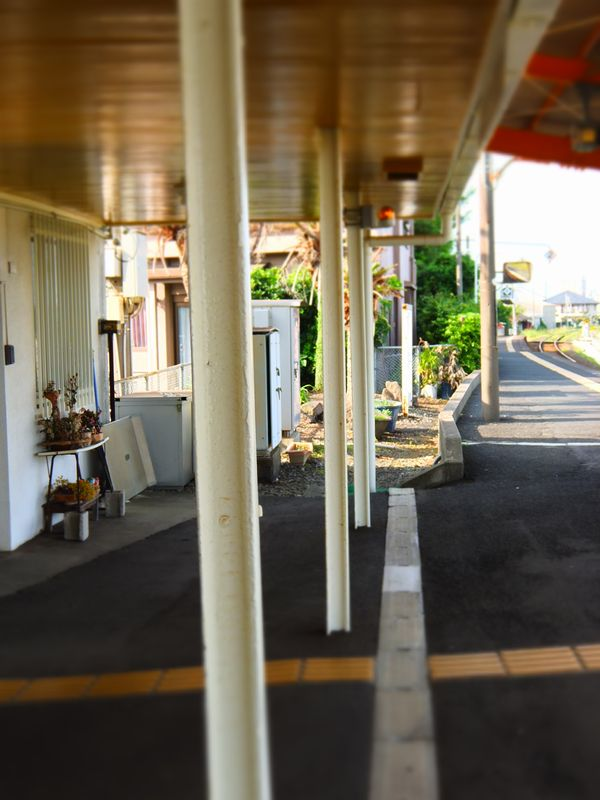
Platform

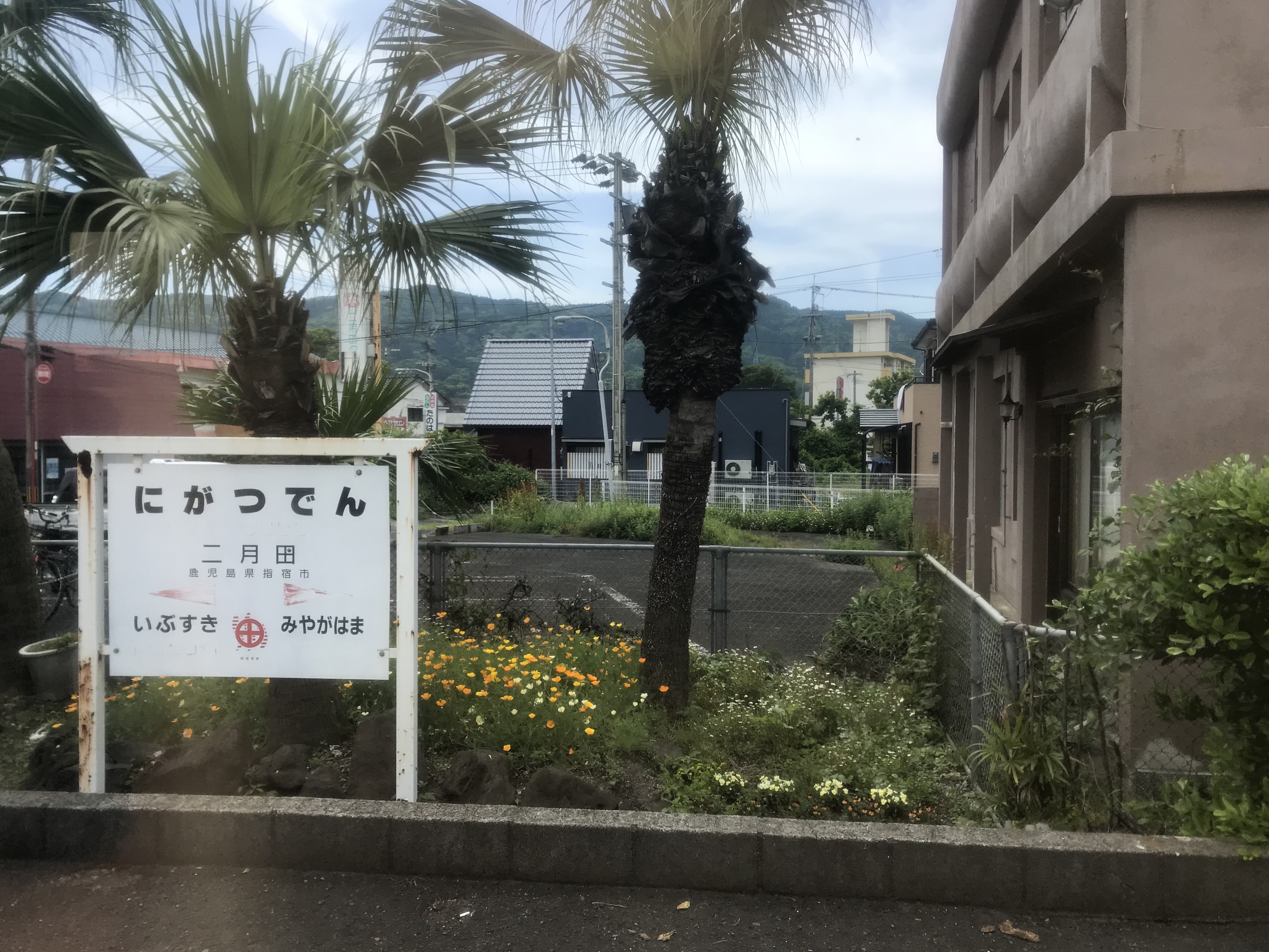
Station sign

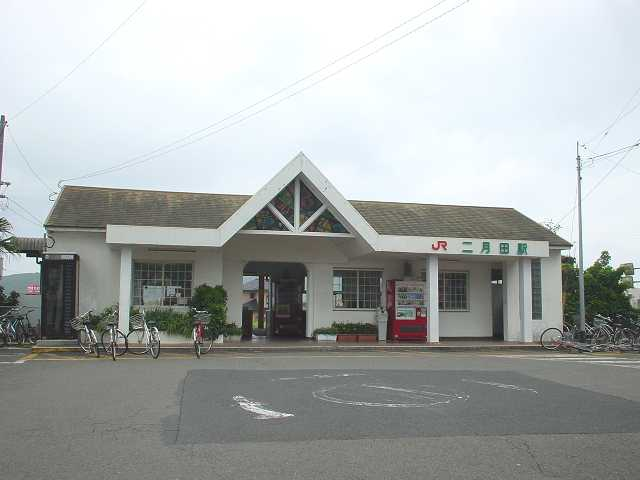
before repainting in 2005

== History ==
The station was opened on 19 December 1934 by the Japanese Government Railways (JGR) . On 31 October 1961 with the name of the line is changed to the Ibusuki Makurazaki Line. With the privatization of Japanese National Railways (JNR), the successor of JGR, on 1 April 1987, JR Kyushu took over control of the station.

== Passenger statistics ==
In fiscal 2020, the station was used by an average of 318 passengers daily (boarding passengers only), and it ranked 270th among the busiest stations of JR Kyushu.

== Surrounding area ==
- Ibusuki City Hall
- Ibusuki City Yanagida Elementary School
- Ibusuki Summary Court

== See also ==
- List of railway stations in Japan
