= Ibusuki Onsen =

Hot springs system in Kagoshima Prefecture, Japan

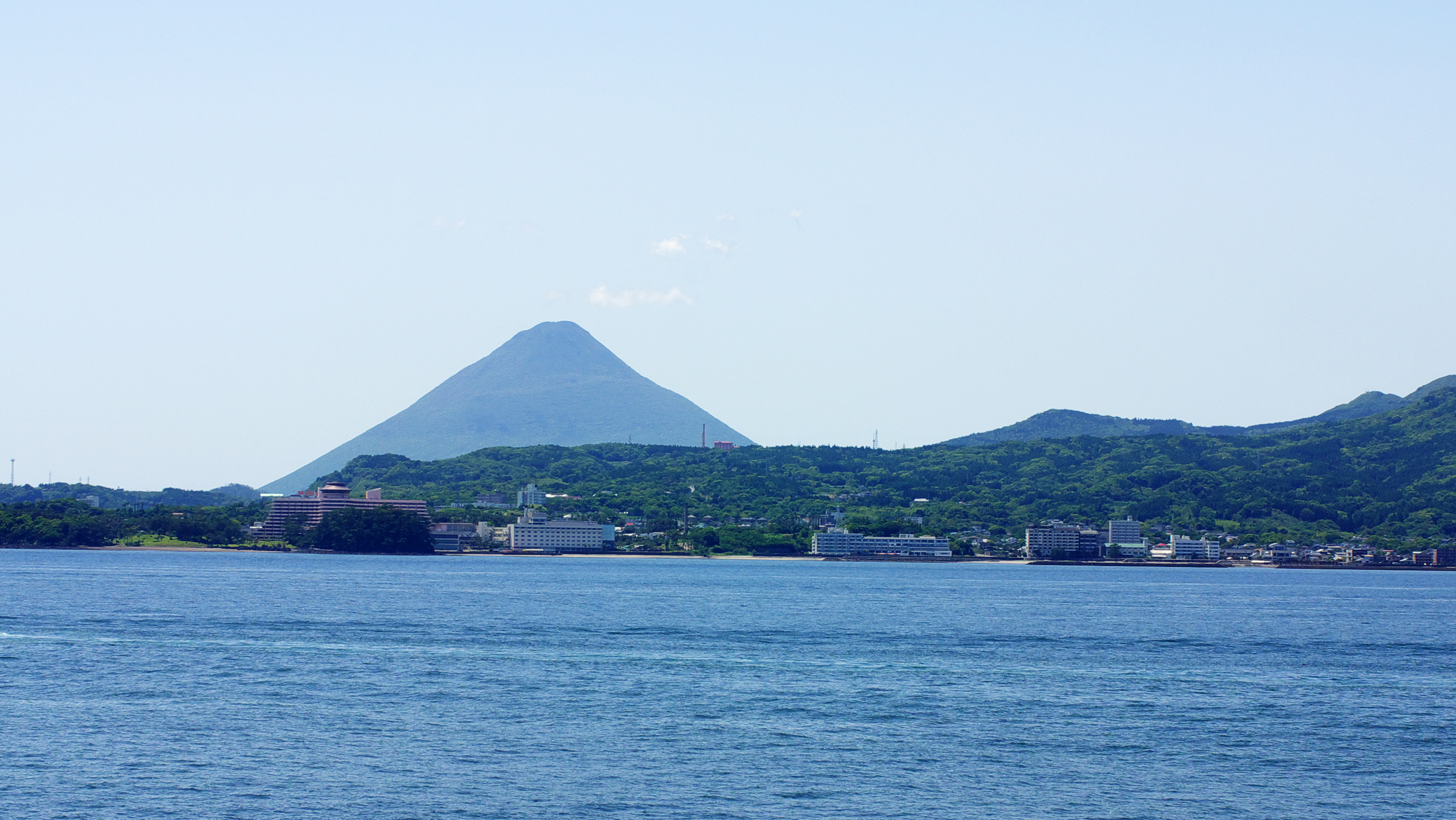

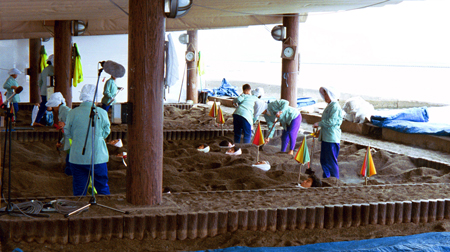

Ibusuki Onsen (指宿温泉) is a group of hot springs in the east of Ibusuki, Kagoshima in Japan. It is known for hot spring-heated sand bathing which allegedly has therapeutic effects.

90% of the water is used for industry.

== Access ==
It takes about an hour from Kagoshima-Chūō Station by train, and about one hour and thirty-five minutes by non-stop bus.

== Water profile ==
There are about 500 places operating as spring sources. The total amount of hot spring water discharged is approximately 120,000 tonnes per day. The water contains mostly sodium. It is a chloride spring but the concentration of salt and minor components differ by region or depth of excavation. The temperature of discharge is about 50 to 60 degrees, but there is one which is near 100 degrees.

== History ==
It is thought that boiling hot spring water flows from the inland area hot spring source to the coastline, where it naturally gushes forth.

Seawater also permeates the sandy beaches, but a boundary forms underground between the underground water and the seawater, resulting in the inability of the boiling water to flow past and out into the sea.

Sunamushi onsen was first referenced to in literature over 450 years ago by the Portuguese merchant Jorge Alvares, who wrote “The Japan Report”. It contains the following text:

“While the tide is low and if you are buried in around 22cm of sand, it is possible to feel the hot spring beneath you. There the elderly appear to be making themselves a hole, lying in it and bathing for two hours morning and night.

== Suna-mushi hot sand bathing ==
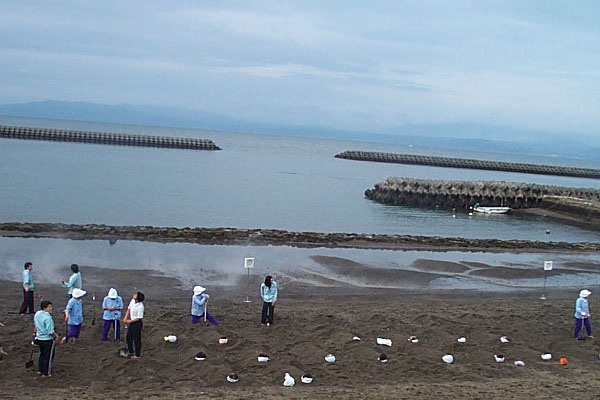
People sand bathing on the beach with staff in attendance

Suna-mushi is a kind of sand bathing that has been known for at least 300 years. First bathers put on a yukata. They are covered with sand and steamed by sands, which is agitated to be a moderate temperature. It is difficult to bath alone, so staff are on hand to shovel sand over bathers. Draping a towel around the head is advised to keep sand from sticking to it. The temperature of the hot sand is approximately 50 °C (122 °F) to 55 °C (131 °F).

== Cultural resources ==
The Satsuma Denshokan Museum is located in Ibusuki Onsen, presenting the history of Kagoshima (Satsuma). The collection has a focus on Meiji period ceramics made locally.

The Flower Park Kagoshima is located in Ibusuki which contains 400,000 plants of 2,400 species. It is the largest flower park in Japan; most of its species are subtropical.

The Kaimon Sanroku Koryoen is a nearby herb plantation where approximately 100 rare and common herbs are grown and sold. It was established in 1941 and is Japan's first plantation specializing in herbs. Among the planting are approximately 10,000 Hosho camphor trees from which essential oil is extracted.

== Marathon ==
Since 1982, the city has held the annual Ibusuki Onsen Marathon (after 1984, the name was changed to Ibusuki Nanohana Marathon) on the second Sunday of January and more than 10,000 people take part in it every year.
