= Tōsenkyō =

Gorge in Kagoshima in southern Japan

Coordinates: 31°13′13″N 130°32′34″E

Tōsenkyō (唐船峡) is a gorge in Ibusuki, Kagoshima Prefecture, in southern Japan. It stands southwest of the Ikeda Lake. The name Tōsenkyō is derived from a place known as Tōsen-ga-saka, which had a deep cove in the Edo period (1603–1868) where many Chinese ships came to anchor in (tōsen means Chinese ships).

== Tōsenkyō and sōmen ==
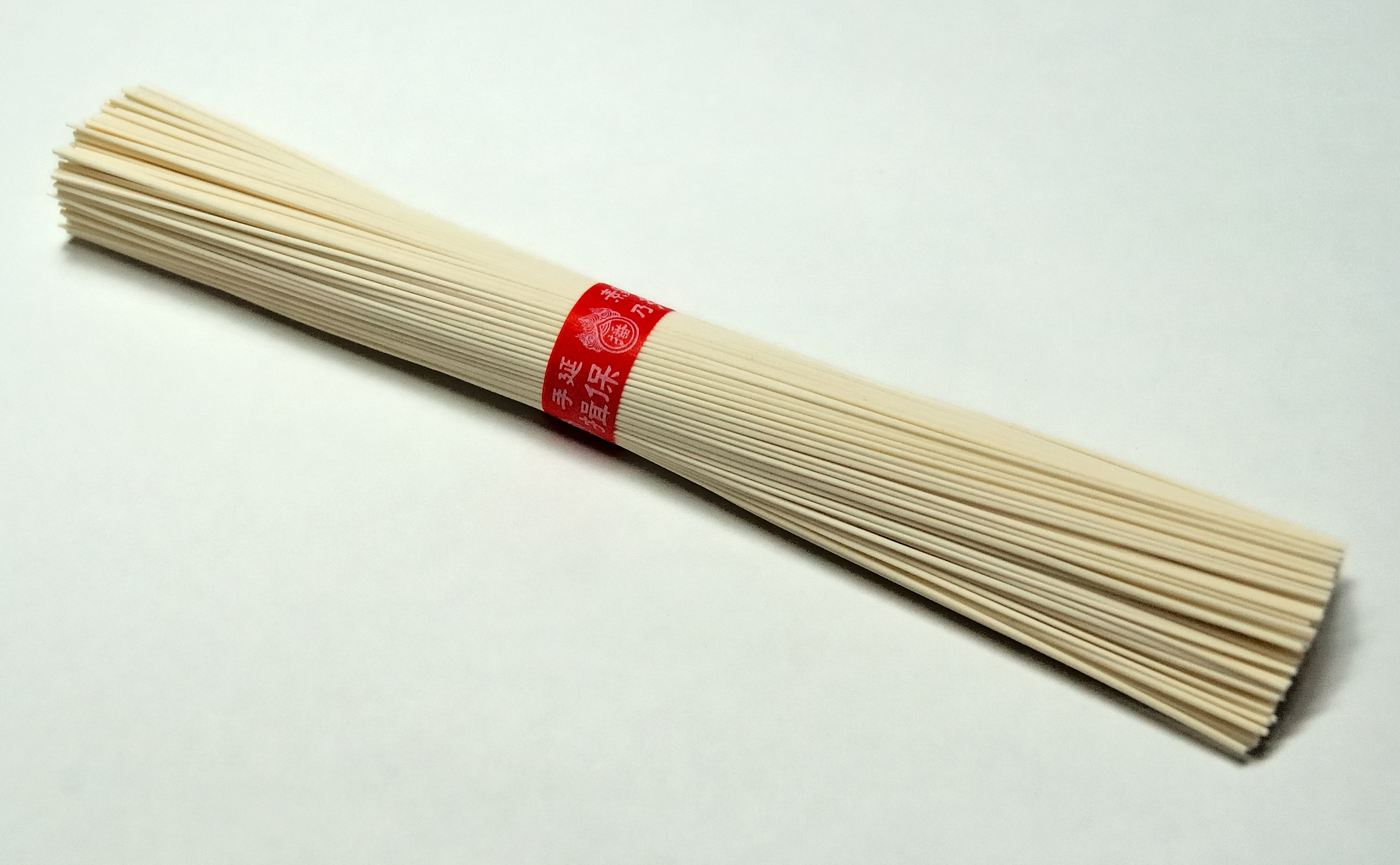
Sōmen

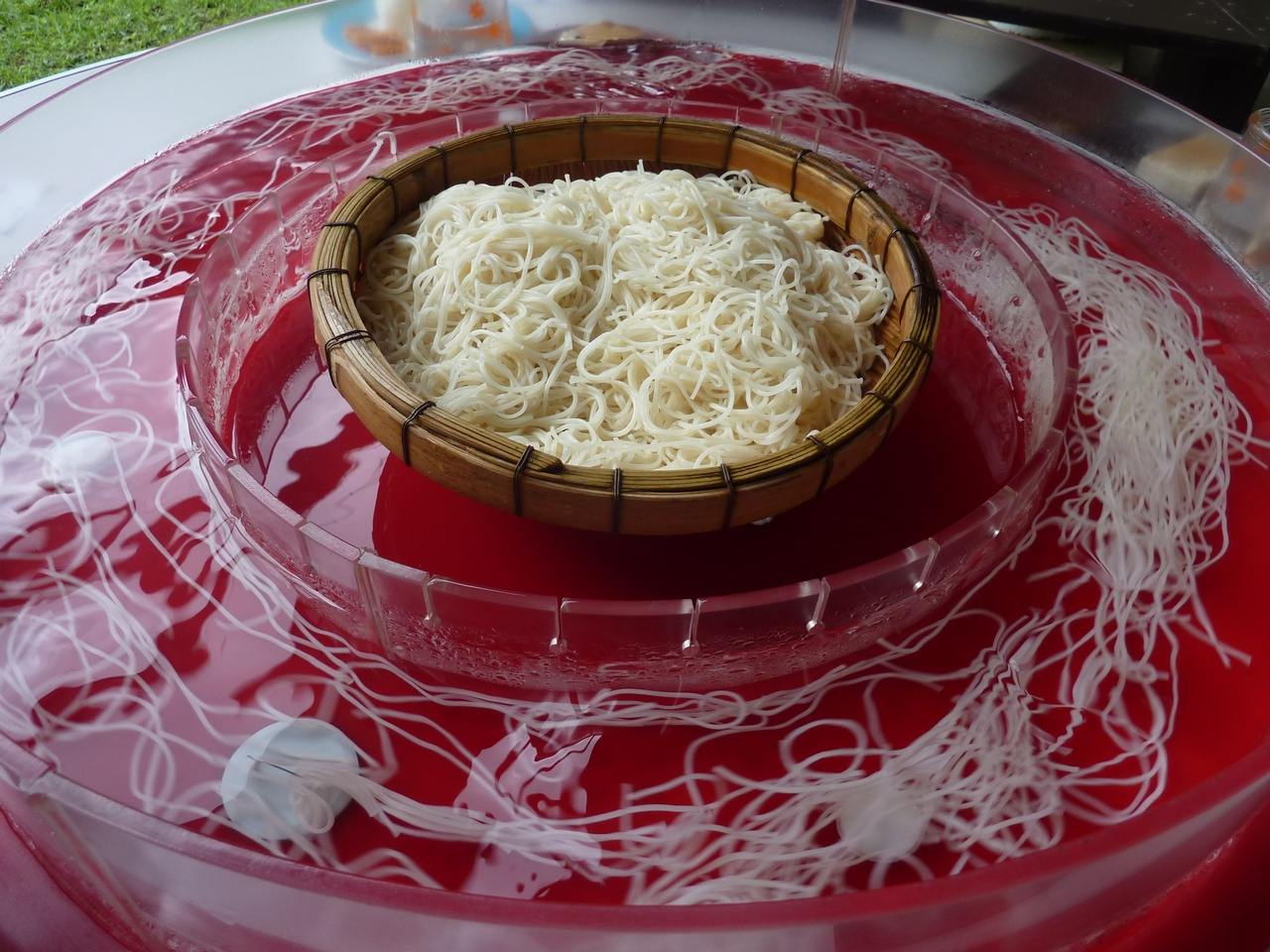
Nagashi-sōmen (at Kagoshima)

The reason Tōsenkyō is famous all over the country is its nagashi-sōmen or sōmen-nagashi (“flowing noodles”), which is regarded as a summer attraction (outdoor party cuisine).

Ordinarily, noodles are placed in a long flume of bamboo across the length of the restaurant. The flume carries clear, ice-cold water. As the sōmen passes by, diners pluck it out with their chopsticks and dip them in tsuyu broth.

In 1962, people sought a way to use the clear stream in Tōsenkyō. For their first trial they poured thin noodles through bamboo as normal. It got much attention. Based on this, Inoue Hironori invented a turn-style motorized machine which is able to swirl thin noodles around inside it. Originally, this machine was under a personal patent, but in 1967 he transferred the patent to Ibusuki city. The city then put this machine to practical use as part of its efforts to develop the town, and publicized Tōsenkyō as the birthplace of flowing noodles.

Today, Tōsenkyō is known as the village of nagashi-sōmen. The park is well-maintained easily accessible for tourists. Miso soup with carp in it is also famous there. Wasabi is grown commercially in the clear stream across Tōsenkyō. Sturgeons have also been farmed in recent years in a study to make caviar a special product.

== See also ==
- Chanpurū
- Somen salad
