= Ibusuki =

Ibusuki 指宿市
- City
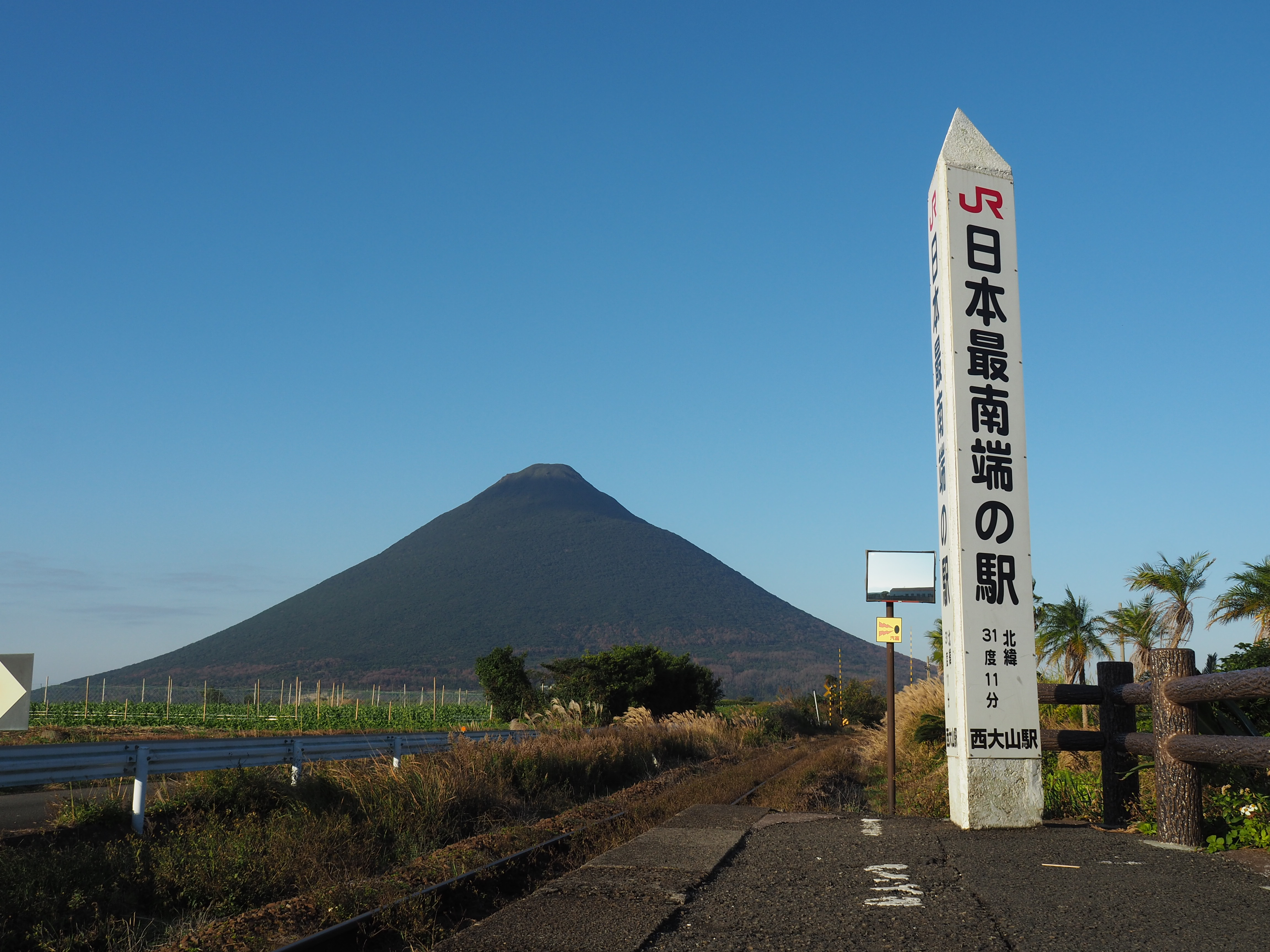

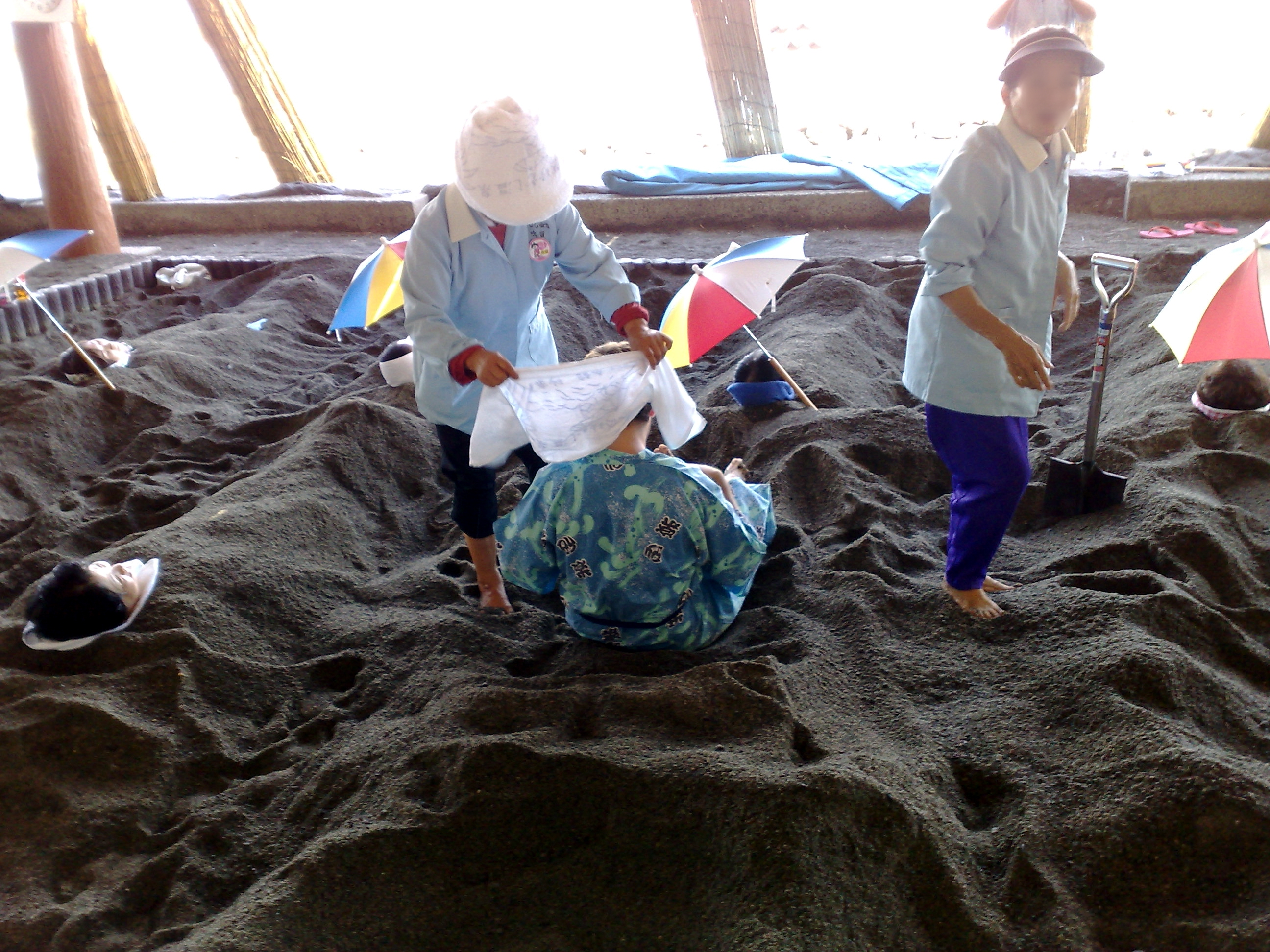

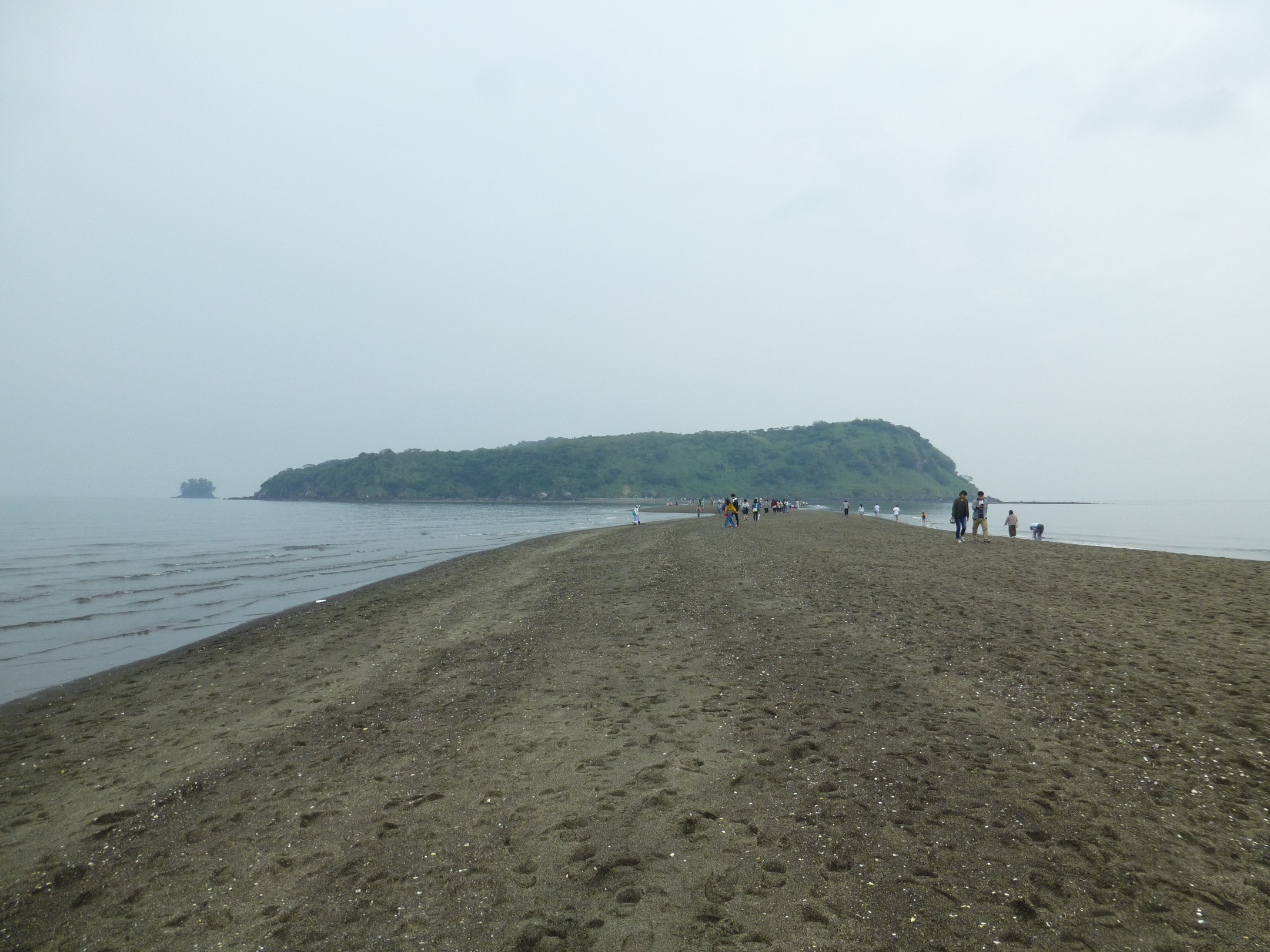

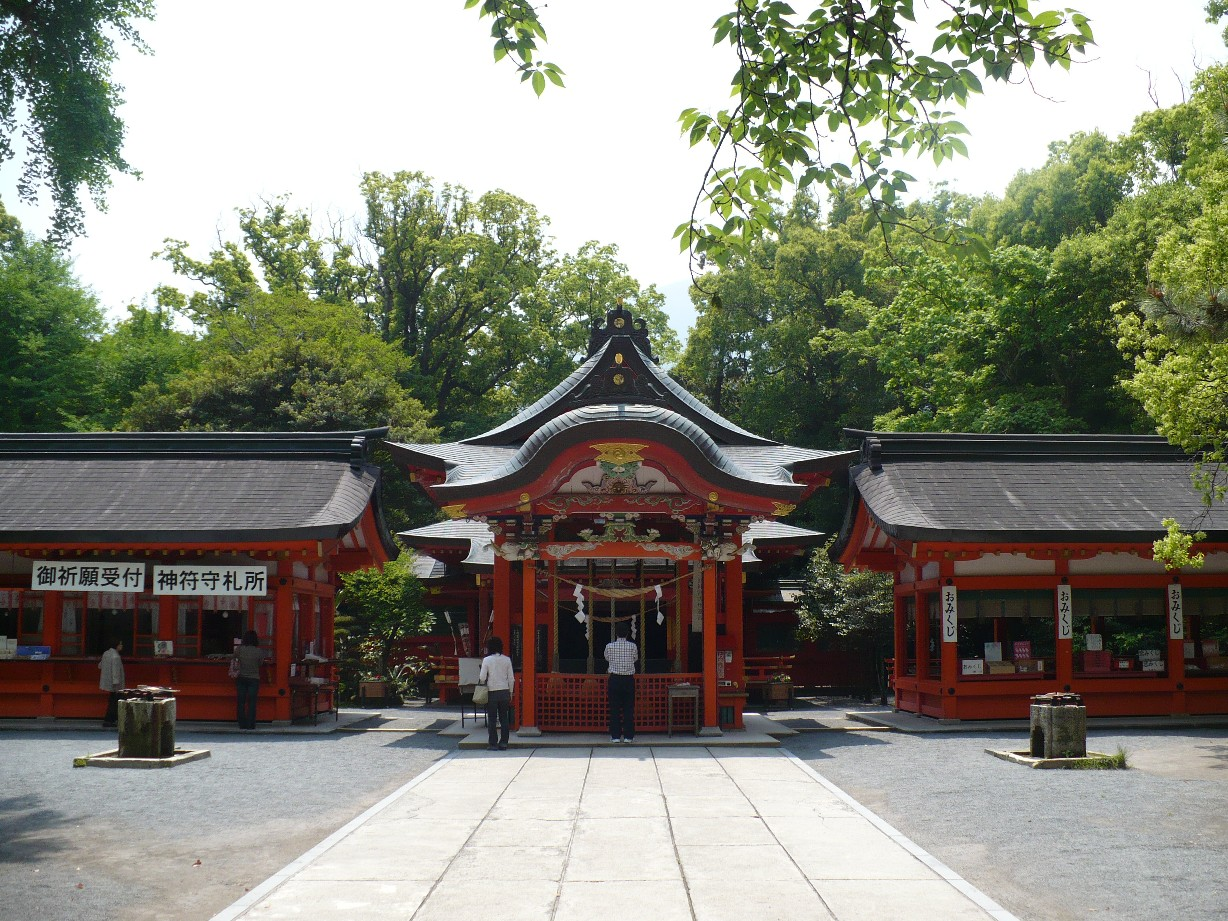

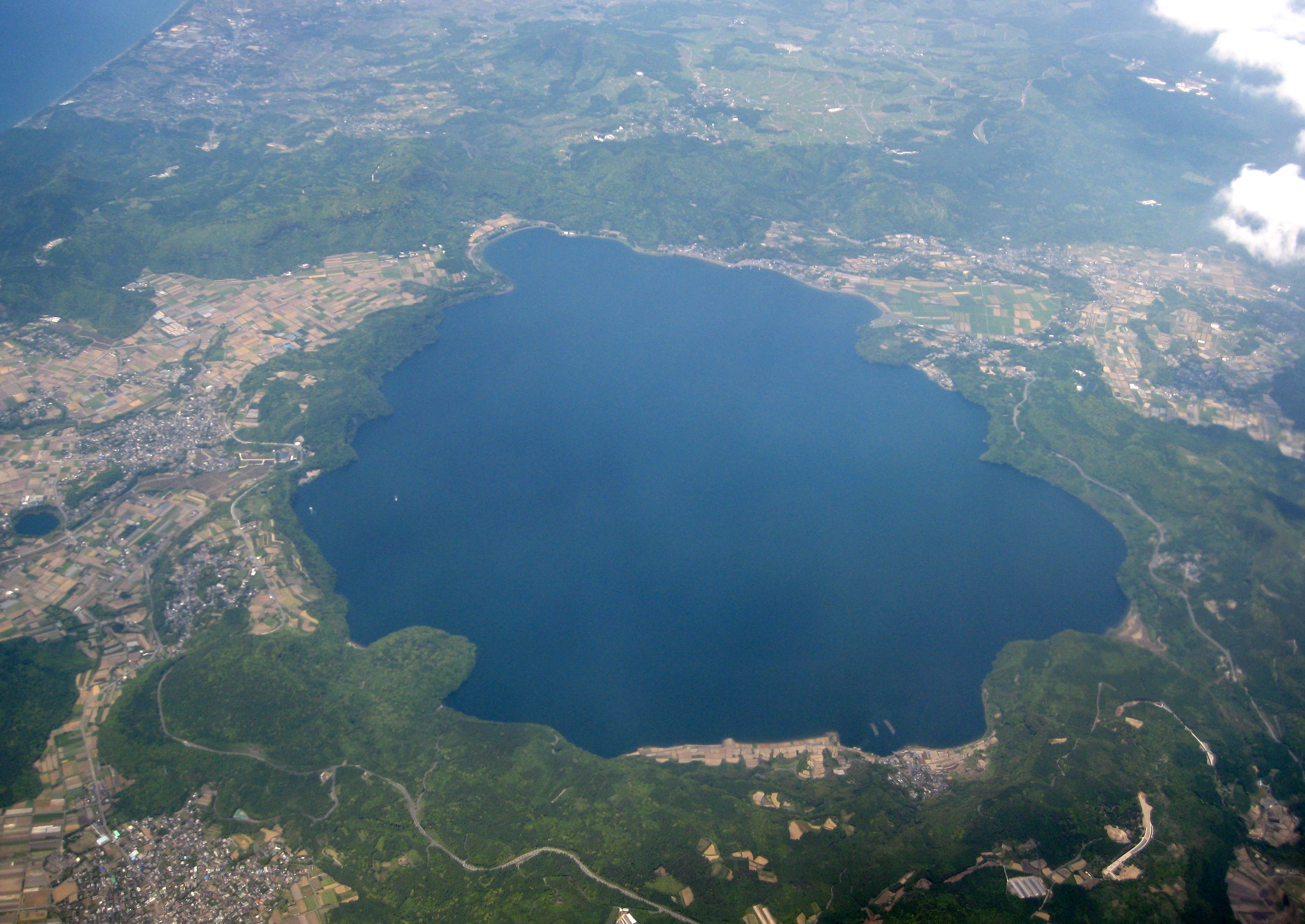
Nishi-Ōyama Station and Mount Kaimon
Ibusuki Onsen sand baths	Chiringashima
Hirasaki Shrine	Lake Ikeda
- Flag Emblem
- Interactive map of Ibusuki
- Location in Japan
- Coordinates: 31°15′10″N 130°37′59″E
- Country: Japan
- Region: Kyushu
- Prefecture: Kagoshima

Government
  - Mayor: Akashi Uchikoshi (from February 2022)

Area
  - Total: 148.81 km^{2} (57.46 sq mi)
- as of July 1, 2021

Population (March 31, 2023)
  - Total: 37,594
  - Density: 252.63/km^{2} (654.31/sq mi)
- Time zone: UTC+09:00 (JST)
- City hall address: 2424 Jutchō, Ibusuki-shi, Kagoshima-ken 891-0497
- Climate: Cfa
- Website: Official website
- Symbols
- Bird: Japanese white-eye
- Butterfly: Great orange tip
- Fish: Skipjack tuna
- Flower: Hibiscus and rapeseed
- Tree: Japanese box and sacred garlic pear

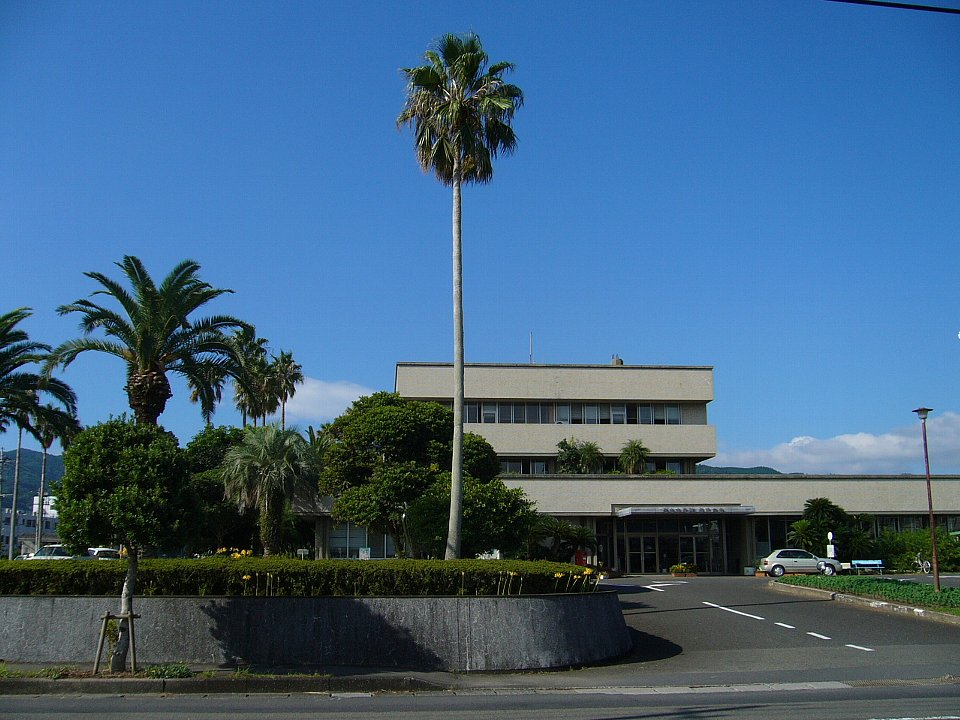
Ibusuki City Hall

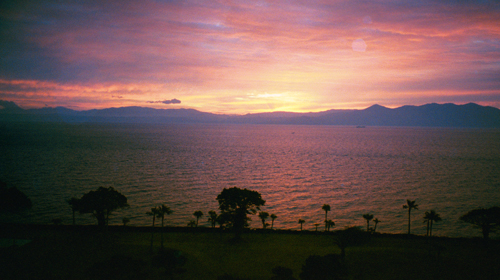
Sunset in Ibusuki

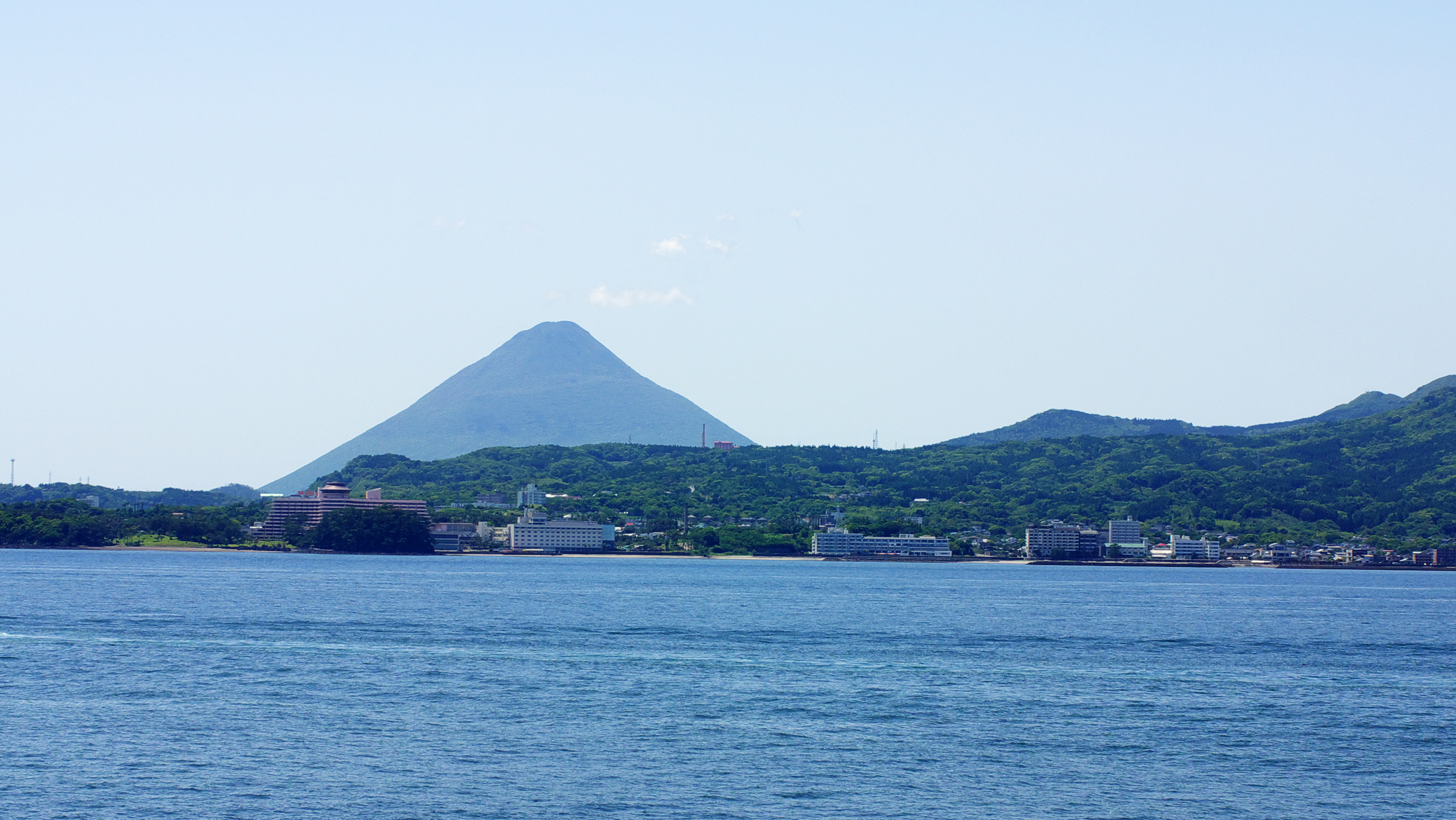
Ibusuki from Kagoshima Bay towards Mount Kaimon

Ibusuki (指宿市, Ibusuki-shi; Japanese pronunciation: [ì.bɯ̈́.sɨ̥.k̟ʲì, -k̟ʲí.ɕì]) is a city located in Kagoshima Prefecture, Japan. As of 31 January 2024, the city had an estimated population of 37,594 in 17477 households, and a population density of 250 people per km^{2}. The total area of the city is 148.81 km^{2} (57.46 sq mi).

== Geography ==
Ibusuki is located about 50 kilometers south of Kagoshima City, on the southeastern tip of the Satsuma Peninsula, and faces the East China Sea and Kagoshima Bay from the northeastern to eastern, southern and southwestern parts of the city. Lake Ikeda is located in the center of the city, and Unagi Pond is to the east of that. Mount Kaimon is located along the East China Sea in the southwestern part of the city. The urban center is mainly formed along the coast, but in the area around Mount Kaimon, the urban area is located inland from Mount Kaimon. Parts of the city are within the borders of the Kirishima-Kinkowan National Park.

=== Geology ===
The city has many volcanoes and hot springs of the Ibusuki Volcanic Field. The Yamagawa Binary Power Station uses local geothermal power to contribute a maximum of 4990 kilowatts as a "green energy" source.

=== Neighboring municipalities ===
Kagoshima Prefecture

- Kagoshima
- Minamikyūshū

== Climate ==
Ibusuki has a humid subtropical climate (Köppen climate classification Cfa) with hot summers and mild winters. Precipitation is significant throughout the year, and is heavier in summer, especially the months of June and July. The average annual temperature in Ibusuki is 18.3 °C (64.9 °F). The average annual rainfall is 2,602.1 mm (102.44 in) with June as the wettest month. The temperatures are highest on average in August, at around 28.1 °C (82.6 °F), and lowest in January, at around 8.7 °C (47.7 °F). Its record high is 37.6 °C (99.7 °F), reached on 2 August 2026, and its record low is −3.4 °C (25.9 °F), reached on 25 January 2016. Due to its marine subtropical climate, the city is the northern limit in Japan where cycads grow naturally.

Climate data for Ibusuki (1991−2020 normals, extremes 1977−present)
Month	Jan	Feb	Mar	Apr	May	Jun	Jul	Aug	Sep	Oct	Nov	Dec	Year
Record high °C (°F)	23.5 (74.3)	24.0 (75.2)	26.4 (79.5)	28.7 (83.7)	32.4 (90.3)	34.4 (93.9)	37.1 (98.8)	37.6 (99.7)	35.3 (95.5)	33.5 (92.3)	29.5 (85.1)	24.3 (75.7)	37.6 (99.7)
Mean daily maximum °C (°F)	13.2 (55.8)	14.5 (58.1)	17.5 (63.5)	21.9 (71.4)	25.6 (78.1)	27.6 (81.7)	31.7 (89.1)	32.6 (90.7)	30.1 (86.2)	25.6 (78.1)	20.4 (68.7)	15.3 (59.5)	23.0 (73.4)
Daily mean °C (°F)	8.7 (47.7)	9.8 (49.6)	12.6 (54.7)	16.5 (61.7)	20.4 (68.7)	23.6 (74.5)	27.5 (81.5)	28.1 (82.6)	25.5 (77.9)	20.8 (69.4)	15.7 (60.3)	10.8 (51.4)	18.3 (65.0)
Mean daily minimum °C (°F)	4.5 (40.1)	5.2 (41.4)	7.8 (46.0)	11.5 (52.7)	15.7 (60.3)	20.3 (68.5)	24.2 (75.6)	24.7 (76.5)	21.8 (71.2)	16.7 (62.1)	11.4 (52.5)	6.6 (43.9)	14.2 (57.6)
Record low °C (°F)	−3.4 (25.9)	−3.0 (26.6)	−1.6 (29.1)	0.9 (33.6)	6.9 (44.4)	11.8 (53.2)	17.0 (62.6)	17.6 (63.7)	12.6 (54.7)	6.5 (43.7)	2.7 (36.9)	−1.8 (28.8)	−3.4 (25.9)
Average precipitation mm (inches)	93.0 (3.66)	133.4 (5.25)	192.2 (7.57)	232.3 (9.15)	237.9 (9.37)	592.0 (23.31)	352.8 (13.89)	204.1 (8.04)	239.2 (9.42)	107.4 (4.23)	120.3 (4.74)	97.5 (3.84)	2,602.1 (102.44)
Average precipitation days (≥ 1.0 mm)	9.3	9.9	12.6	10.7	10.3	16.1	11.0	10.5	11.0	7.7	8.4	8.6	126.1
Mean monthly sunshine hours	123.0	134.1	158.5	175.8	176.3	105.7	196.6	221.2	177.3	182.0	153.0	136.1	1,938.3
Source: Japan Meteorological Agency

== Demographics ==
Per Japanese census data, the population of Ibusuki in 2020 is 39,011 people. Since the census began in Ibusuki in 1950, the town's population has been slowly declining, with no signs of picking up. In March 2012, the city had an estimated population of 43,931, with 19,119 households and a population density of 294.82 persons per km^{2}. However the census of 2020 confirmed a population decline to 39,011 and by October 2022 there were only 17,537 households . The census of 2024, showed that the population had declined even further and was at 36,656 people, and 17,317 households.

Historical population

Year	Pop.	±%
1950	67,977	—
1955	66,420	−2.3%
1960	63,118	−5.0%
1965	59,615	−5.5%
1970	55,832	−6.3%
1975	55,282	−1.0%
1980	55,140	−0.3%
1985	54,781	−0.7%

Year	Pop.	±%
1990	52,292	−4.5%
1995	50,529	−3.4%
2000	48,750	−3.5%
2005	46,822	−4.0%
2010	44,401	−5.2%
2015	41,831	−5.8%
2020	39,011	−6.7%

Ibusuki population statistics

== History ==
The area of Ibusuki was part of ancient Satsuma Province. During the Edo Period, the area was under the control of Satsuma Domain. After the Meiji restoration, the village of Ibusuki was established with the creation of the modern municipalities system on April 1, 1889. Ibusuki was raised to town status on May 1, 1933. Much of the town was destroyed in a fire on February 24, 1938. On April 1, 1954 Ibusuki merged with the village of Imaizumi and was elevated to city status. On January 1, 2006, the towns of Kaimon and Yamagawa (both from Ibusuki District) were merged into Ibusuki.

== Government ==
Ibusuki has a mayor-council form of government with a directly elected mayor and a unicameral city council of 18 members. Ibusuki contributes one member to the Kagoshima Prefectural Assembly. In terms of national politics, the city is part of the Kagoshima 2nd district of the lower house of the Diet of Japan.

== Economy ==
The local economy of Ibusuki is reliant on commercial fishing, agriculture, electricity production and tourism.

== Education ==
Ibusuki has nine public elementary schools, five public junior high school and one public high school operated by the city government, and two public high schools operated by the Kagoshima Prefectural Board of Education. The prefecture also operates a special education school for the handicapped.

== Transportation ==
=== Railways ===
JR Kyushu - Ibusuki Makurazaki Line

■ Satsuma-Imaizumi - Miyagahama - Nigatsuden - Ibusuki - Yamakawa - Ōyama - Nishi-Ōyama - Satsuma-Kawashiri - Higashi-Kaimon - Kaimon - Irino

=== Highways ===
- National Route 226
- National Route 269
- National Route 448

== Sister cities ==
- Rockhampton, Queensland, Australia

== Local attractions ==
Ibusuki is famous for black-sand spas known as sunamushi onsen and the fine noodle sōmen nagashi.

- Chiringashima
- Hirasaki Shrine
- Ibusuki Experimental Botanical Garden
- Ibusuki Onsen
- Iwasaki Art Museum
- Lake Ikeda
- Mount Kaimon
- Ryūgū Shrine
- Tōsenkyō
