= Kaimon Station =

Railway station in Ibusuki, Kagoshima Prefecture, Japan

Kaimon Station 開聞駅
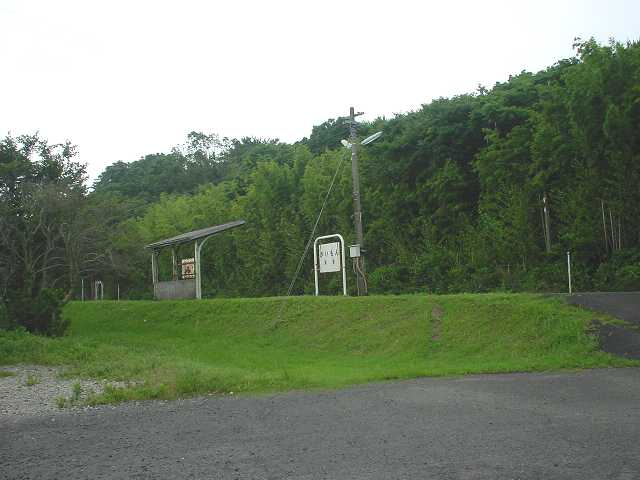
- Kaimon Station

General information
- Location: Kaimon Jutchō, Ibusuki-shi, Kagoshima-ken 891-0603; Japan
- Coordinates: 31°12′14″N 130°32′5″E
- Operator: JR Kyushu
- Line: ■ Ibusuki Makurazaki Line
- Distance: 61.0 km from Kagoshima-Chūō
- Platforms: 1 side platform

Other information
- Status: Unstaffed
- Website: Official website

History
- Opened: 22 March 1960

Passengers
- FY2015: 25 daily

Services
Preceding station	JR Kyushu	Following station
Higashi-Kaimon towards Kagoshima-Chūō	Ibusuki Makurazaki Line	Irino towards Makurazaki
Location
- Location within Kagoshima Prefecture Location within Japan

Kaimon Station (開聞駅, Kaimon-eki) is a passenger railway station located in the city of Ibusuki, Kagoshima Prefecture, Japan. It is operated by JR Kyushu.

== Lines ==
The station is served by the Ibusuki Makurazaki Line and is located 61.0 km from the starting point of the line at Kagoshima-Chūō.

== Layout ==
This is an above-ground station with one side platform and one track. It is an unattended station. The is no station building but only a small short open shelter on the platform. When it first opened, it was an interchange station with one island platform and two tracks. Remnants of this can still be seen in the track layout. The station building was renovated into a tourist information center and coffee shop in 1987 and demolished in 2002.

== History ==
The station was opened on 22 March 1960 as a station on the JNR Ibusuki Line. With the privatization of Japanese National Railways (JNR), the successor of JGR, on 1 April 1987, JR Kyushu took over control of the station.

== Passenger statistics ==
In fiscal 2015, the station was used by an average of 13 passengers daily.

== Surrounding area ==
- Mount Kaimon
- Japan National Route 226
- Ibusuki City Hall Kaimon Building (formerly Kaimon Town Hall)

== See also ==
- List of railway stations in Japan
