= Chiringashima =

Island in Ibusuki, Kagoshima, Japan

Coordinates: 31°16′37″N 130°40′38″E

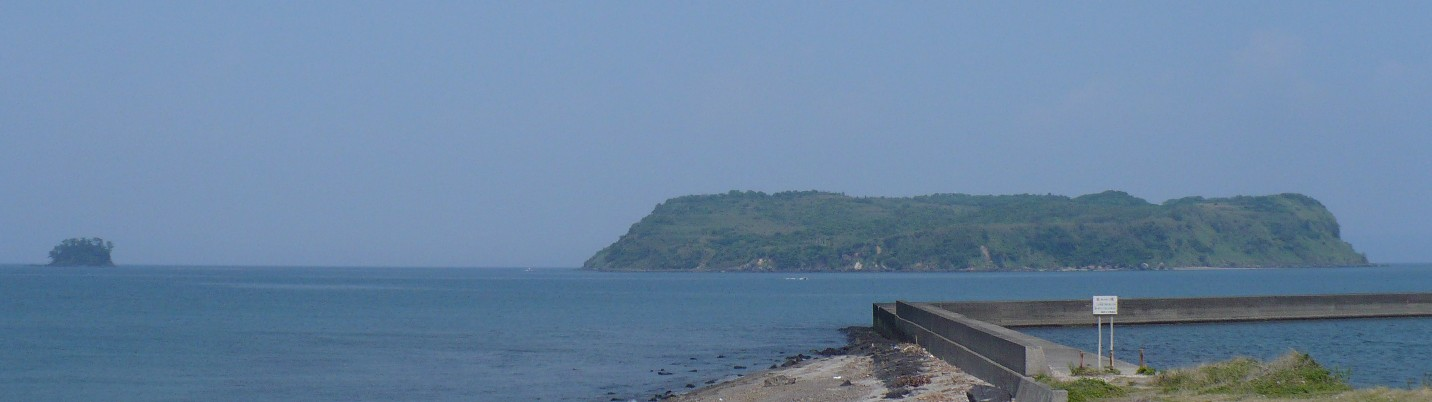
Chiringashima

Chiringashima (知林ヶ島) is an island in Ibusuki, Kagoshima, Japan.

== Geography ==
Chiringashima is the biggest island in Kagoshima Bay. It is uninhabited and lies about 800m off Tarahama. Its circumference is about 3 km and the area is about 60 ha, with a highest point of about 90m. There is a small island which is about 0.2ha that lies about 320m north of Chiringashima called Kojima or Chirinkojima. Chiringashima is a part of the somma of Ibusuki caldera.

From March to October, at low tide, a white sandbar about 800m long appears, enabling people to walk to the island in about 20 minutes, a Tombolo phenomenon. Because of this connection to the mainland, the island is also nicknamed the Love Knot Island and the sandbar is called the Ibusuki Chiririn Sand Road. The longest time it appears is for four hours. According to statistics of the city, for 190 days in a year it appears more than an hour, and for 86 days in a year more than two hours. This sandbar is occasionally washed away after a typhoon, and disappears for a while, but it is restored when sand is deposited by the tides. The sandbar is on the base of welded tuff.

The plant Vincetoxicum austrokiusianum, which is listed as an endangered species, has been found on Chirin-ga-shima.

== Sightseeing ==
In the island, there are esplanades and an observation deck, visitors can enjoy fishing and gathering shellfish. Another esplanade and arbor is under construction. A rest station, a visitors' center, and a wharf are also being planned. Since the natural environment has been preserved in this area, the idea of make full use of it is untouched beauty for the tourist industry is under consideration. On the other side of the island, another sandbar also appears for a limited time but the tidal currents around this area are rapid and could put visitors in danger, so safety measures need to be taken.
