= Nukumi Station =

Railway station in Kagoshima, Kagoshima Prefecture, Japan

Nukumi Station 生見駅
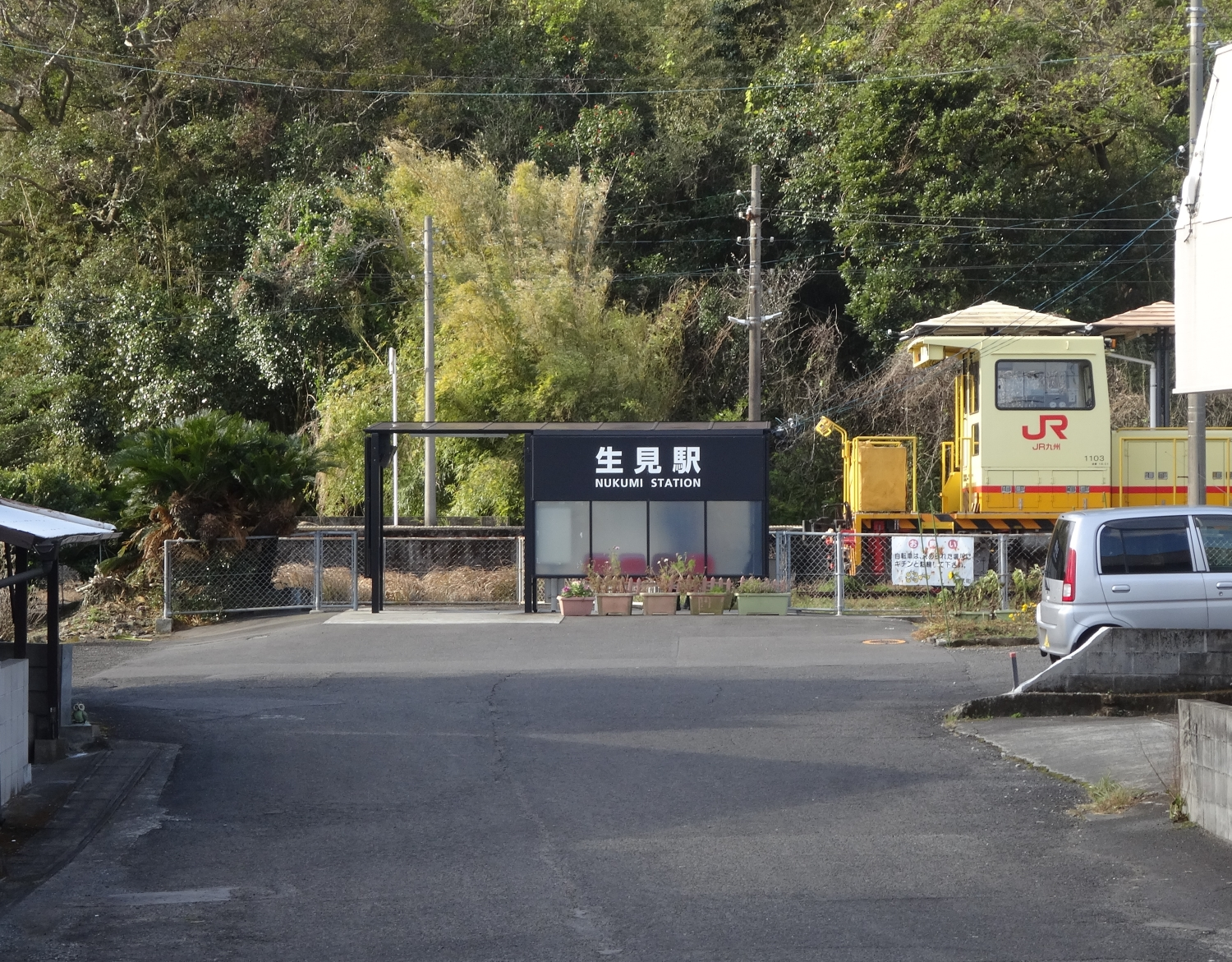
- Nukumi Station in 2019

General information
- Location: 2797 Kiire Nukumi-chō, Kagoshima-shi, Kagoshima-ken, 891-0206; Japan
- Coordinates: 31°18′26″N 130°34′40″E
- Operator: JR Kyushu
- Line: ■ Ibusuki Makurazaki Line
- Distance: 35.0 km from Kagoshima-Chūō
- Platforms: 1 island platform

Other information
- Status: Unstaffed
- Website: Official website

History
- Opened: 19 December 1934

Passengers
- FY2018: 113 daily

Services
Preceding station	JR Kyushu	Following station
Maenohama towards Kagoshima-Chūō	Ibusuki Makurazaki Line	Satsuma-Imaizumi towards Makurazaki
Location
- Location within Kagoshima Prefecture Location within Japan

Nukumi Station (生見駅, Nukumi-eki) is a passenger railway station located in the city of Kagoshima, Kagoshima Prefecture, Japan. It is operated by JR Kyushu.

== Lines ==
The station is served by the Ibusuki Makurazaki Line and is located 35.0 km from the starting point of the line at Kagoshima-Chūō.

== Layout ==
This is an above-ground station with one island platform and a level crossing. It is an unattended station and there is no station building, but only a small open-fronted weather shelter. There is one siding with a very short platform remaining, but this siding is used as a storage space for maintenance vehicles.

=== Platforms ===
1	■ Ibusuki Makurazaki Line	for Ibusuki, Yamakawa and Makurazaki
2	■ Ibusuki Makurazaki Line	for Kiire and Kagoshima-Chūō

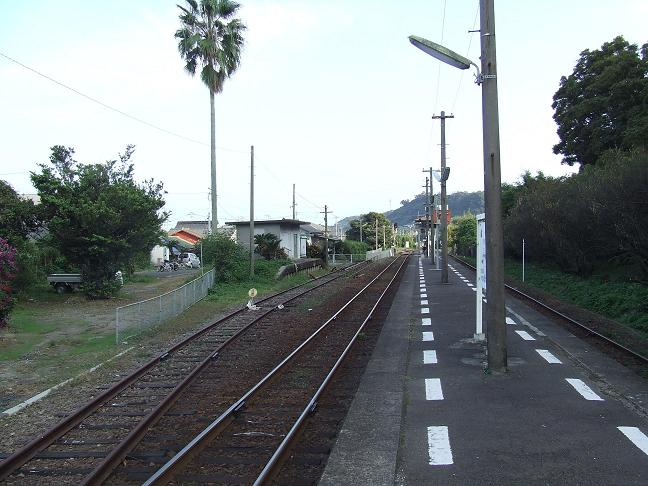
Platform

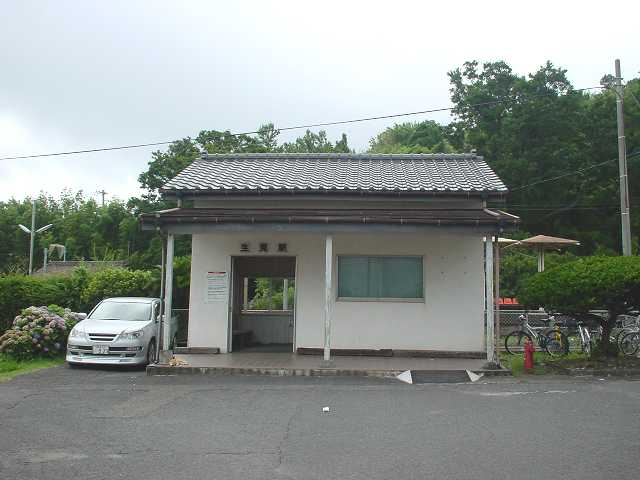
Former station building in 2005

== History ==
The station was opened on 19 December 1934 by the Japanese Government Railways (JGR) . On 31 October 1961 with the name of the line was changed to the Ibusuki Makurazaki Line. With the privatization of Japanese National Railways (JNR), the successor of JGR, on 1 April 1987, JR Kyushu took over control of the station.

== Passenger statistics ==
In fiscal 2015, the station was used by an average of 113 passengers daily.

== Surrounding area ==
- Nukumi Beach

== See also ==
- List of railway stations in Japan
