= Kiire Station =

Railway station in Kagoshima, Kagoshima Prefecture, Japan

Kiire Station 喜入駅
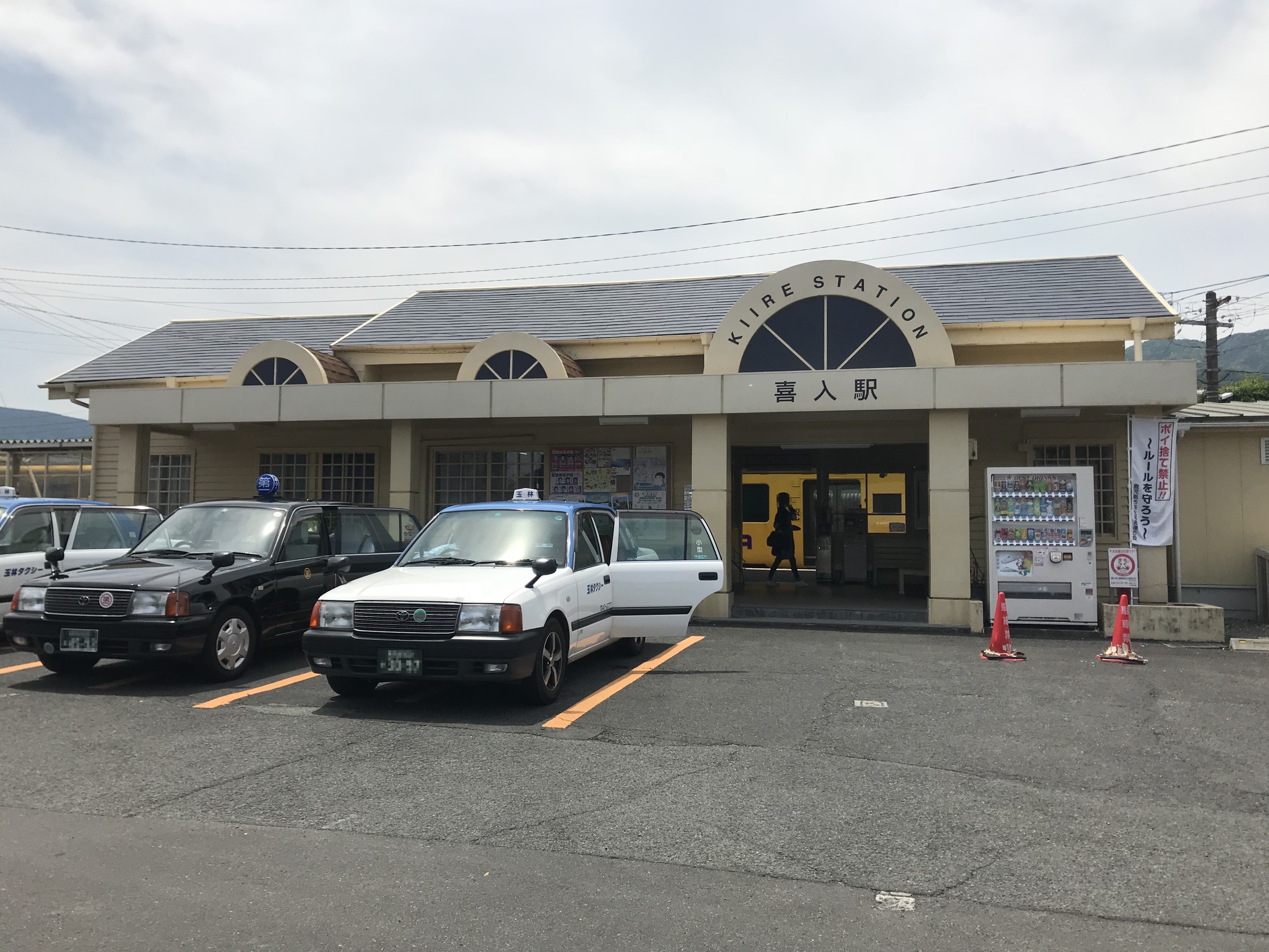
- Kiire Station in 2018

General information
- Location: Kiire-chō, Kagoshima-shi, Kagoshima-ken 891-0203; Japan
- Coordinates: 31°22′17″N 130°32′20″E
- Operator: JR Kyushu
- Line: ■ Ibusuki Makurazaki Line
- Distance: 26.6 km from Kagoshima-Chūō
- Platforms: 2 side platforms

Other information
- Status: Unstaffed
- Website: Official website

History
- Opened: 20 May 1934

Passengers
- FY2020: 461 daily

Services
| Preceding station | JR Kyushu | Following station |
|---|---|---|
| Nakamyō towards Kagoshima-Chūō | Ibusuki Makurazaki Line | Maenohama towards Makurazaki |
Location
- Location within Kagoshima Prefecture Location within Japan

Kiire Station (喜入駅, Kiire-eki) is a passenger railway station located in the city of Kagoshima, Kagoshima Prefecture, Japan. It is operated by JR Kyushu.

== Lines ==
The station is served by the Ibusuki Makurazaki Line and is located 26.6 km from the starting point of the line at Kagoshima-Chūō.

== Layout ==
This is an above-ground station with two opposed side platforms, connected by a footbridge. There is also one non-operational storage track connected to the main line by a crossing switch near Kagoshima-Chuo, which is mainly used for storing maintenance vehicles, where trains can be exchanged. The station is unattended.

=== Platforms ===
| 1 | ■ Ibusuki Makurazaki Line | for Ibusuki and Makurazaki |
| 2 | ■ Ibusuki Makurazaki Line | for Kagoshima-Chūō |

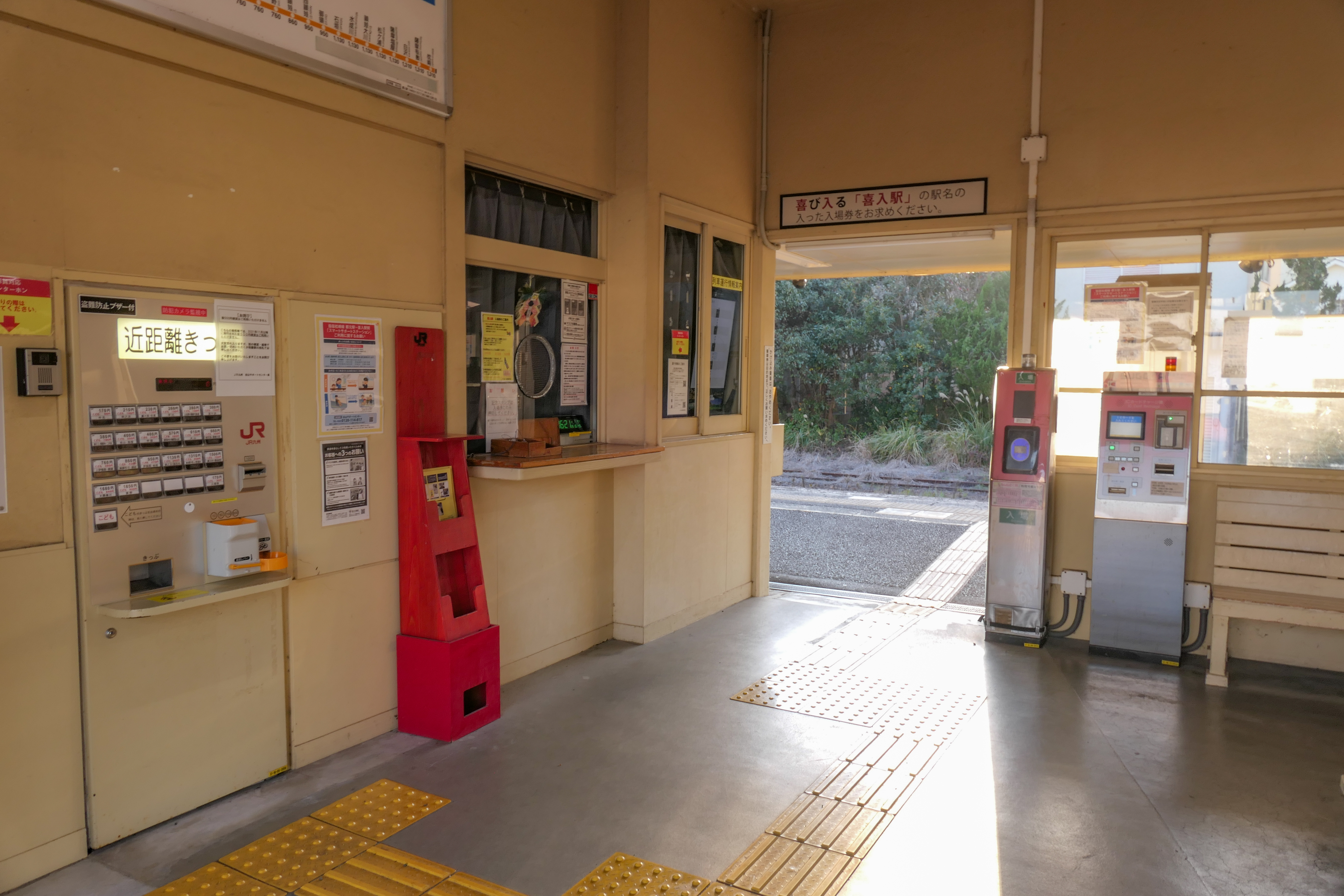
Exit Gate

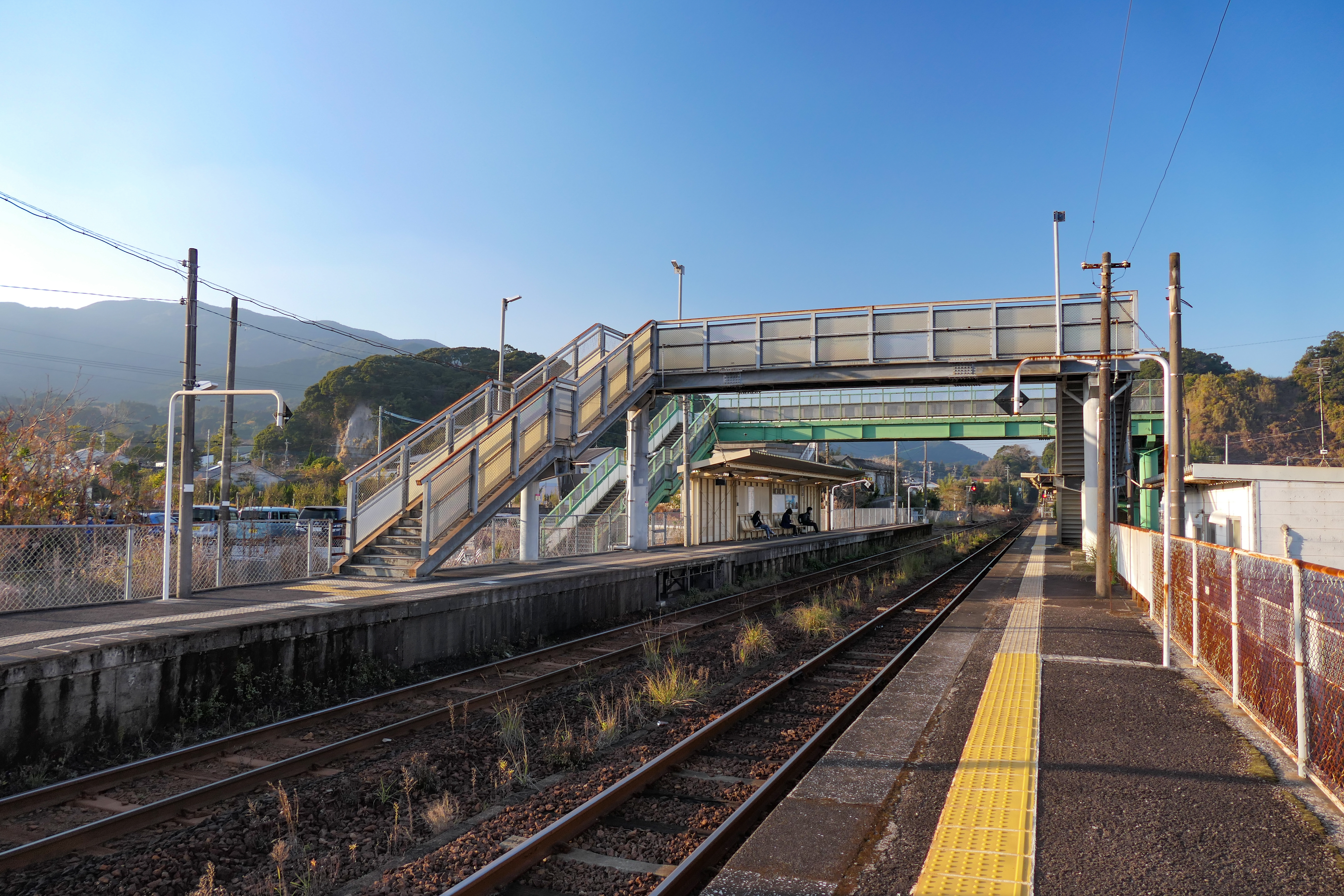
Platform

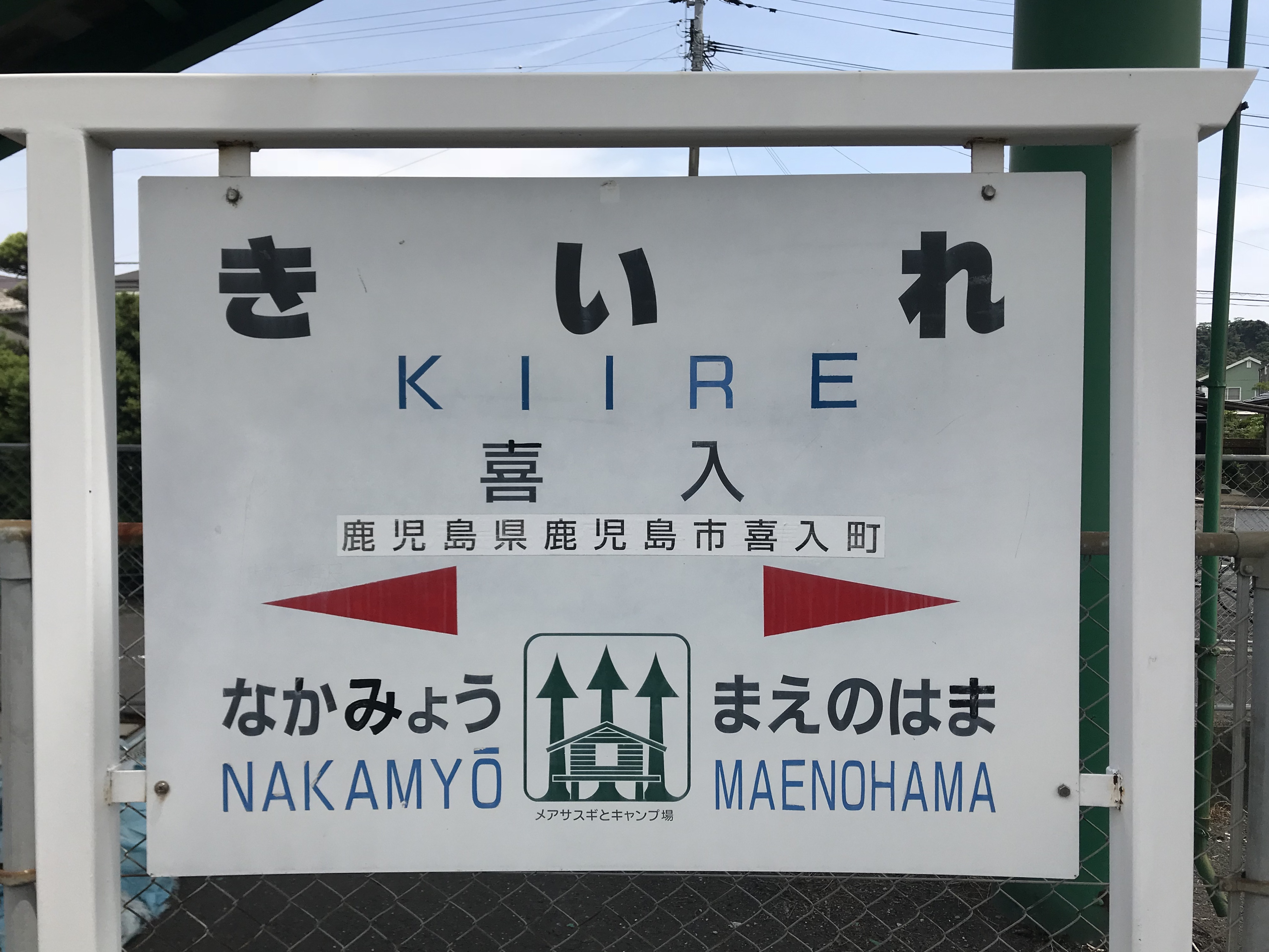
Station signage

== History ==
Japanese Government Railways (JGR) had opened the then Ibusuki Line (指宿線) from Nishi-Kagoshima (now Kagoshima-Chūō to Goino on 7 December 1930. In the next phase of expansion, the track was extended south, with Kiire opening as the new southern terminus on 20 May 1934. It became a through-station on 19 December 1934 when the track was further extended to Ibusuki. On 31 October 1963, the line which served the station was renamed the Ibusuki Makurazaki Line. With the privatization of Japanese National Railways (JNR), the successor of JGR, on 1 April 1987, the station came under the control of JR Kyushu.

== Passenger statistics ==
In fiscal 2020, the station was used by an average of 461 passengers daily (boarding passengers only), and it ranked 226th among the busiest stations of JR Kyushu.

== Surrounding area ==
- Kagoshima City Hall Kiire Branch (formerly Kiire Town Hall)
- Kagoshima City Kiire Elementary School
- Kagoshima City Kiire Junior High School

== See also ==
- List of railway stations in Japan
