= Maenohama Station =

Railway station in Kagoshima, Kagoshima Prefecture, Japan

Maenohama Station 前之浜駅
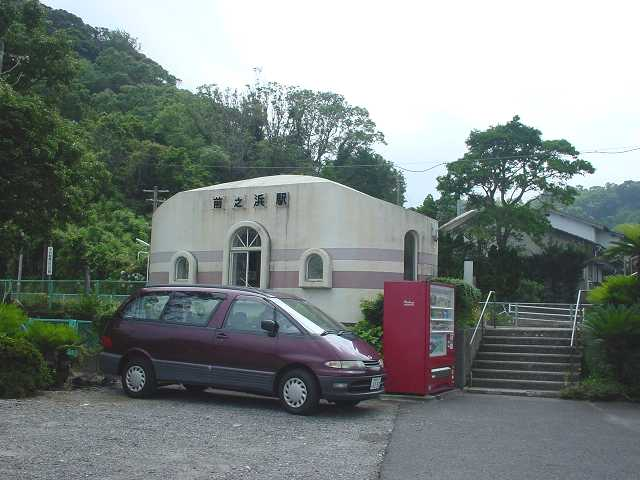
- Maenohama Station

General information
- Location: 8080 Kiire Maenohama-chō, Kagoshima-shi, Kagoshima-ken, 891-0205; Japan
- Coordinates: 31°20′36″N 130°33′26″E
- Operator: JR Kyushu
- Line: ■ Ibusuki Makurazaki Line
- Distance: 30.4 km from Kagoshima-Chūō
- Platforms: 2 side platforms

Other information
- Status: Unstaffed
- Website: Official website

History
- Opened: 19 December 1934

Passengers
- FY2018: 148 daily

Services
Preceding station	JR Kyushu	Following station
Kiire towards Kagoshima-Chūō	Ibusuki Makurazaki Line	Nukumi towards Makurazaki
Location
- Location within Kagoshima Prefecture Location within Japan

Maenohama Station (宮ヶ浜駅, Maenohama-eki) is a passenger railway station located in the city of Kagoshima, Kagoshima Prefecture, Japan. It is operated by JR Kyushu.

== Lines ==
The station is served by the Ibusuki Makurazaki Line and is located 30.4 km from the starting point of the line at Kagoshima-Chūō.

== Layout ==
This is an above-ground station with two opposed side platforms connected by a footbridge. It is an unattended station.

=== Platforms ===
1	■ Ibusuki Makurazaki Line	for Ibusuki, Yamakawa and Makurazaki
2	■ Ibusuki Makurazaki Line	for Kiire and Kagoshima-Chūō

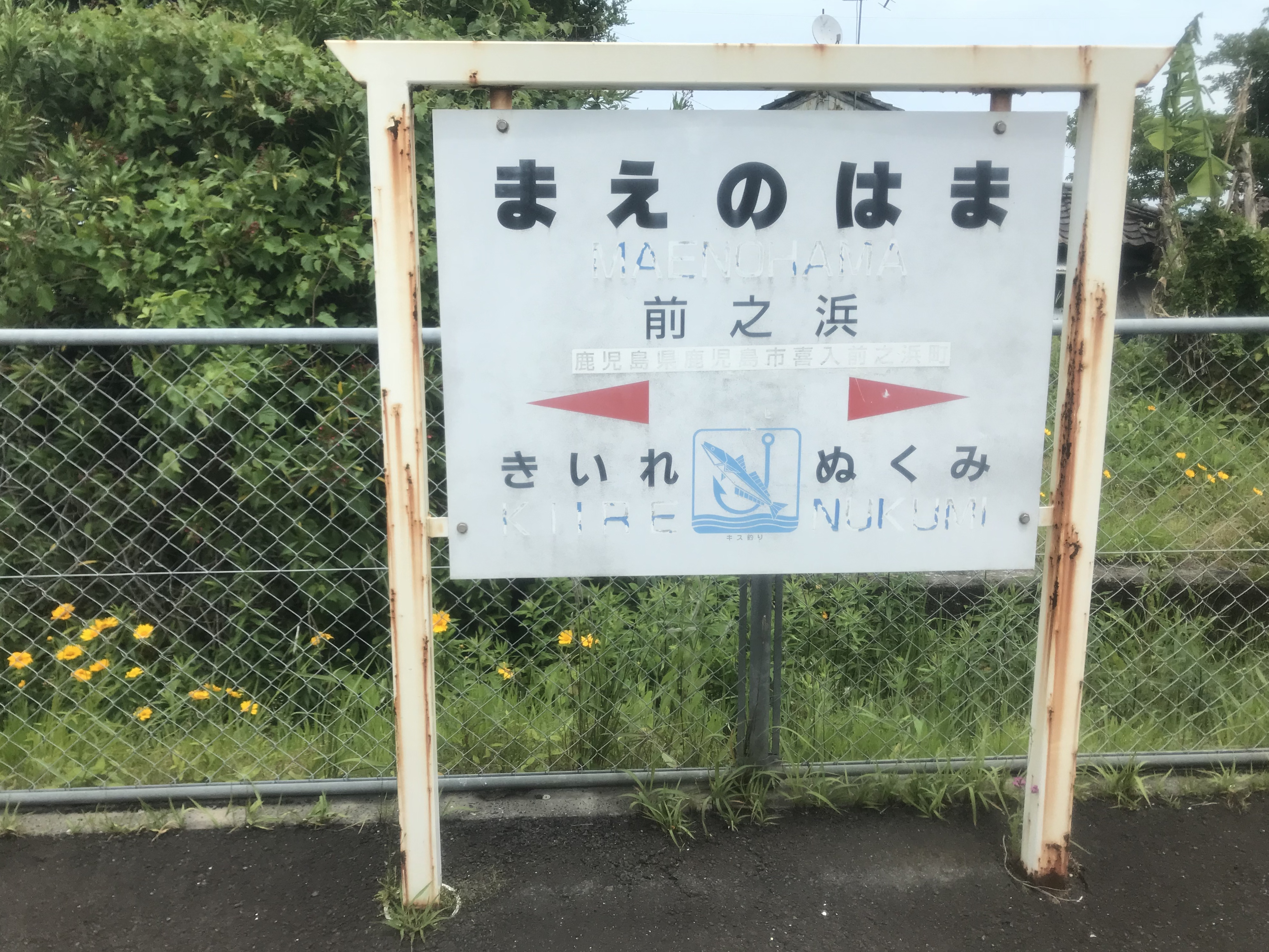
Sign

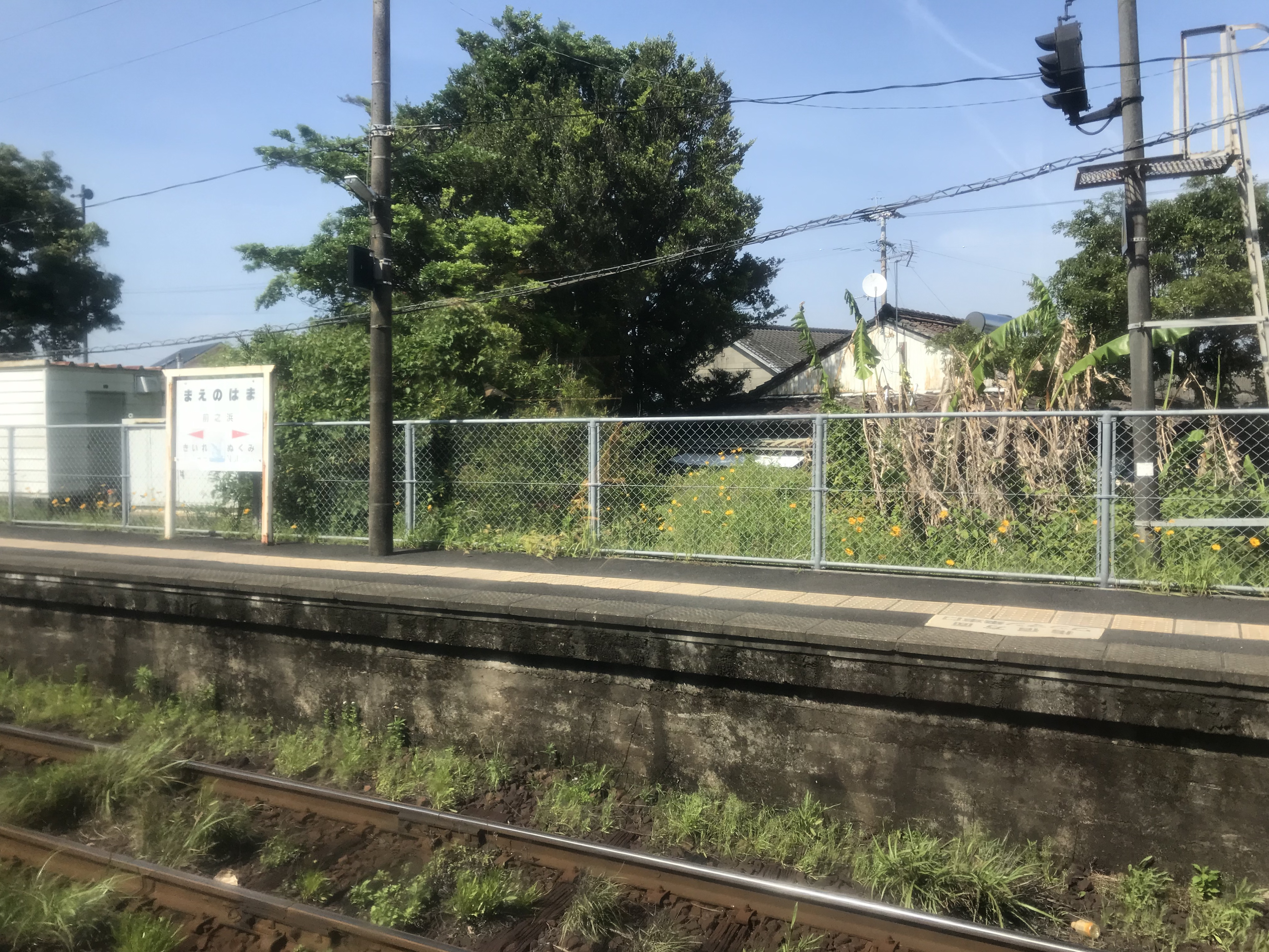
Platform

== History ==
The station was opened on 19 December 1934 by the Japanese Government Railways (JGR) . On 31 October 1961 with the name of the line was changed to the Ibusuki Makurazaki Line. With the privatization of Japanese National Railways (JNR), the successor of JGR, on 1 April 1987, JR Kyushu took over control of the station.

== Passenger statistics ==
In fiscal 2015, the station was used by an average of 148 passengers daily.

== Surrounding area ==
- National Route 226
- Kagoshima City Maenohama Elementary Schoo

== See also ==
- List of railway stations in Japan
