= Matsumoto, Kagoshima =

Dissolved municipality in Hioki district, Kagoshima prefecture, Japan

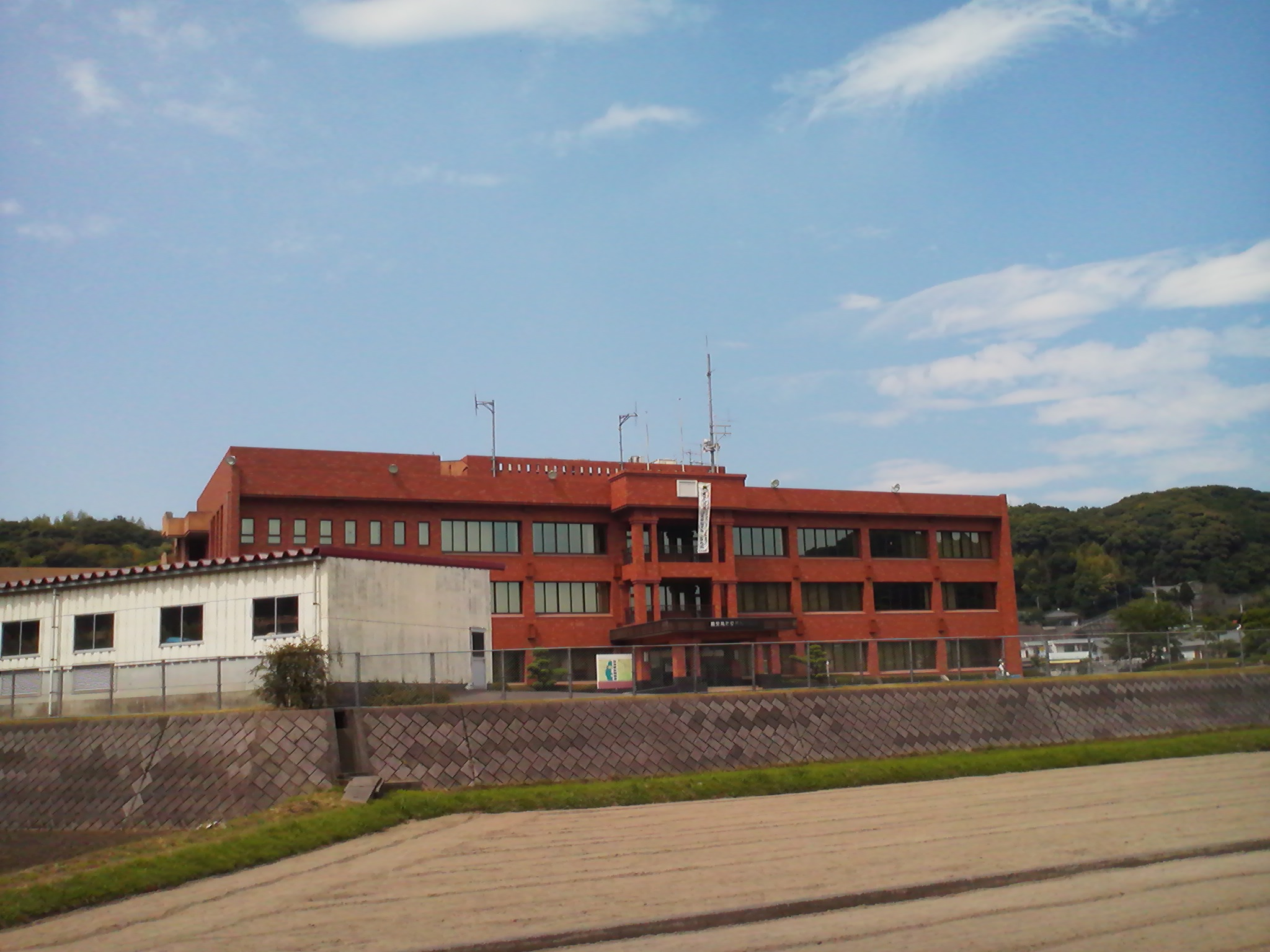
Matsumoto town office

Matsumoto (松元町, Matsumoto-chō) was a town located in Hioki District, Kagoshima Prefecture, Japan.

On November 1, 2004, Matsumoto, along with the town of Kōriyama (also from Hioki District), the town of Kiire (from Ibusuki District), and the towns of Sakurajima and Yoshida (both from Kagoshima District), was merged into the expanded city of Kagoshima and no longer exists as an independent municipality.

== History ==
- 1889 - The village of Kamiijūin consisted of 6 neighborhoods (north to south): Ishitani, Fukuyama, Kamitaniguchi, Irisa, Naoki and Haruyama
- 1960 — The village of Kamiijūin became the town of Matsumoto.
- November 1, 2004 - Matsumoto, along with the towns of Kōriyama, both from Hioki District, and the towns of Sakurajima and Yoshida, both from Kagoshima District, Kiire, both from Ibusuki District, was merged into the expanded city of Kagoshima and no longer exists as an independent municipality.

== Transportation ==
=== Railroad ===
Kyushu passenger rail (Kyushu Railway Company)

- Kagoshima Main Line
  - Satsuma-Matsumoto Station - Kami-Ijūin Station

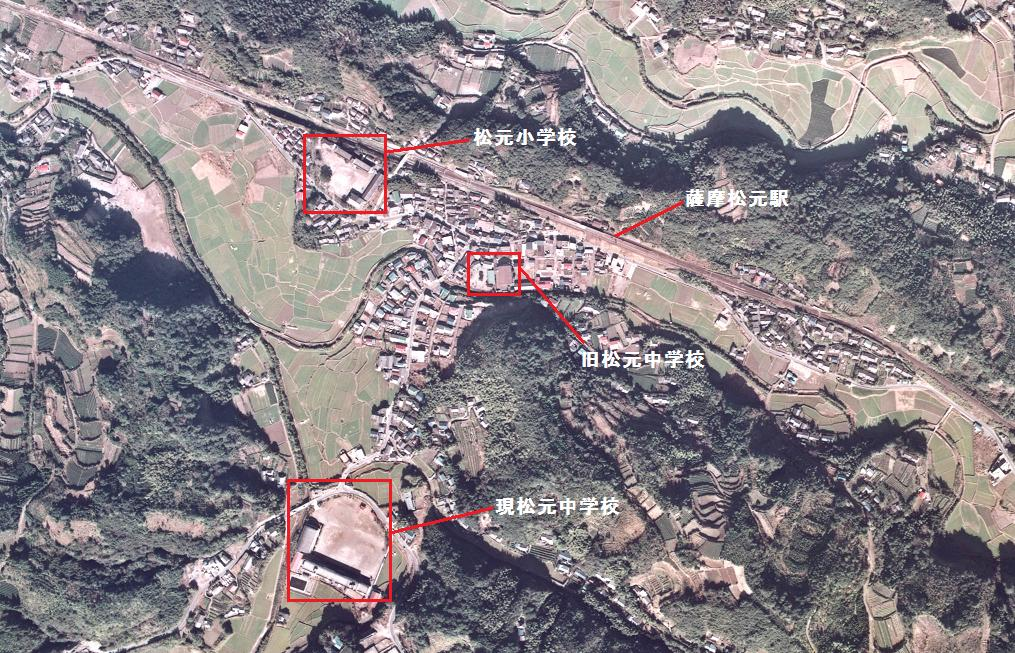
The Kamitaniguchi area

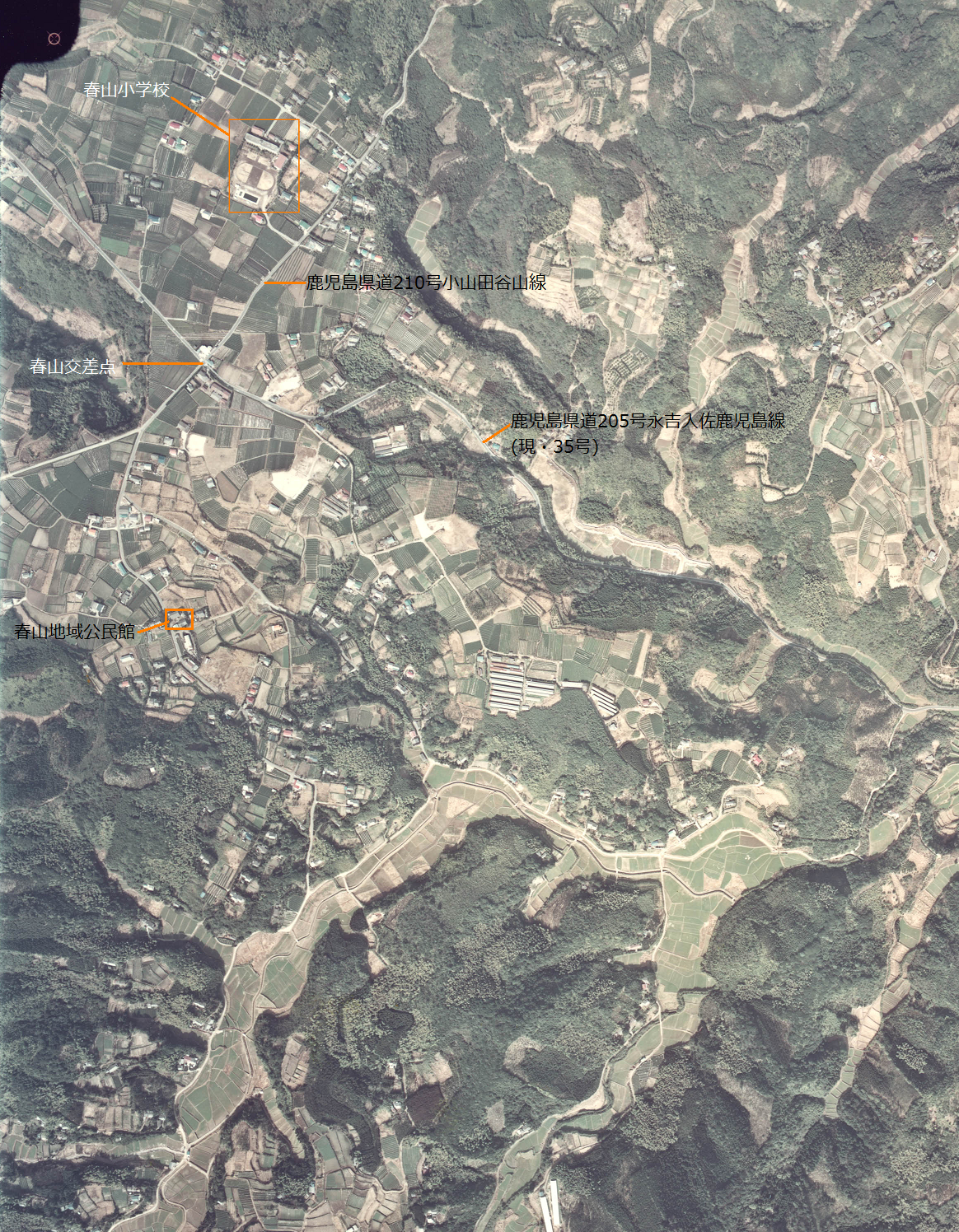
The Haruyama area

=== Road ===
==== Highway ====
Minami-Kyushu Expressway (Kagoshima road) Matsumoto Interchange

==== National highway ====
Unavailable

==== Prefectural Road ====
===== Main Country Path =====
- Kagoshima prefectural road 24 Kagoshima Higashiichiki line
- Kagoshima prefectural road 35 Nagayoshi Irisa Kagoshima Line

===== Public Prefectural Road =====
- Kagoshima prefectural road 296 Kagoshima prefectural road
- Kagoshima Prefectural road 210 koyamada Taniyama line
- Kagoshima prefectural road 291 Matsumoto Kawanabe line
- Kagoshima prefectural road 296 Tanokashira Hukiage line

== Schools ==
=== High school ===
- Shoyo High School

=== Junior high school ===
- Matsumoto Junior High School

=== Elementary school ===
- Matsumoto Elementary School
- Tosho Elementary School
- Haruyama Elementary School
- Isihitani Elementary School
