= Hiroki Station =

Railway station in Kagoshima, Kagoshima Prefecture, Japan

Hiroki Station 広木駅
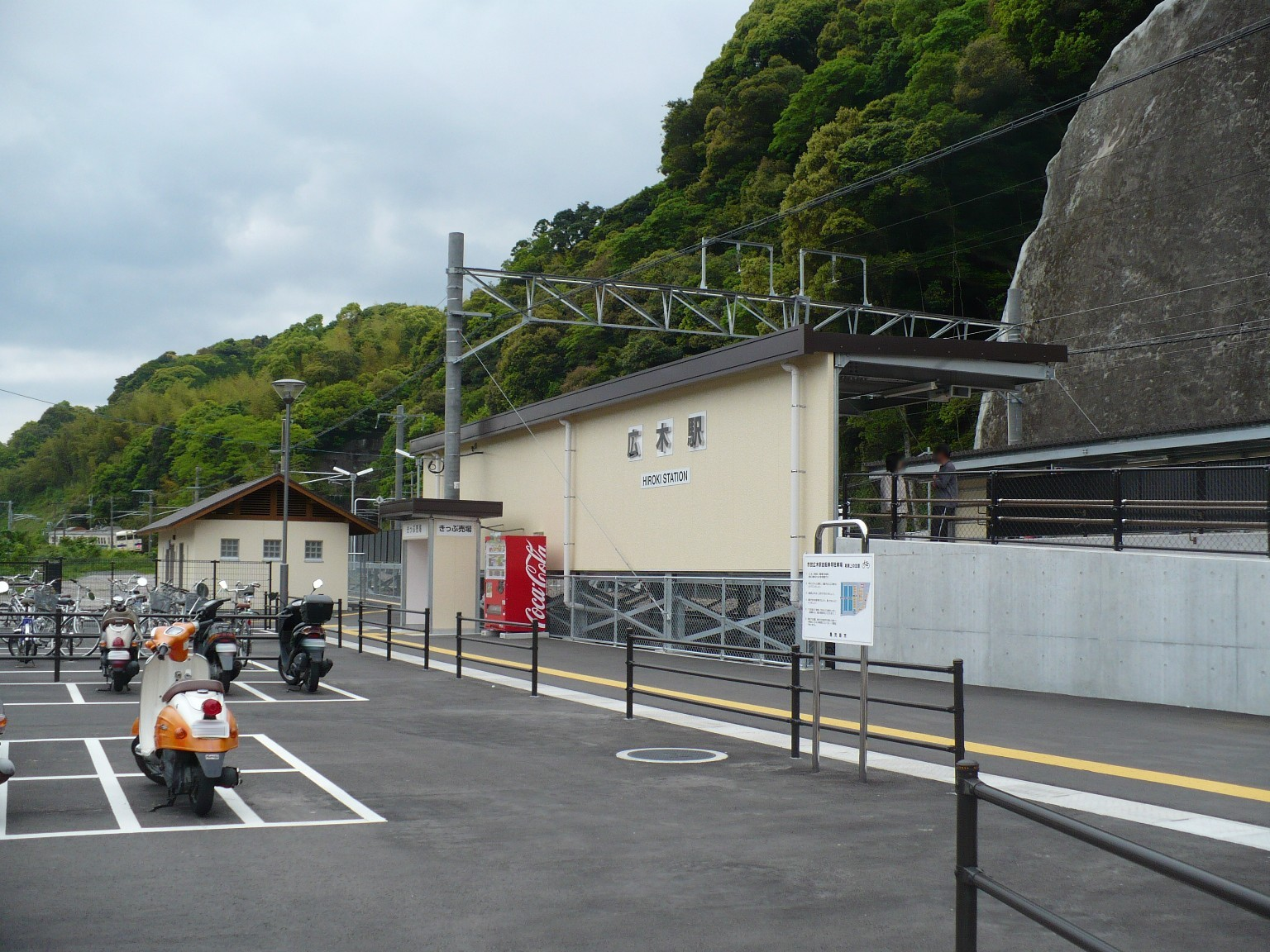
- Hiroki Station

General information
- Location: Tagamicho, Kagoshima-shi, Kagoshima-ken, 890-0035; Japan
- Coordinates: 31°34′36.74″N 130°30′13.81″E
- Operator: JR Kyushu
- Line: ■ Kagoshima Main Line
- Distance: 390.7 km from Mojikō
- Platforms: 2 side platforms

Other information
- Status: Unstaffed
- Website: Official website

History
- Opened: March 14, 2009

Passengers
- FY2020: 861 daily

Services
Preceding station	JR Kyushu	Following station
Kagoshima-Chūō towards Kagoshima	Kagoshima Main Line	Kami-Ijūin towards Mojikō
Location
- Location within Kagoshima Prefecture Location within Japan

Hiroki Station (広木駅, Hiroki-eki) is a railway station is a passenger railway station located in the city of Kagoshima, Kagoshima Prefecture, Japan. It is operated by JR Kyushu.

== Lines ==
The station is served by the Kagoshima Main Line and is located 390.7 km from the starting point of the line at Mojikō.

=== Layout ===
The station is an above-ground station with two opposed side platform connected by a level crossing The station is unattended.

=== Platforms ===
1	■ ■ Kagoshima Main Line	for Ijuin and Sendai
2	■ ■ Kagoshima Main Line	for Kagoshima-Chūō

== History ==
The station was opened on 14 March 2009.

== Passenger statistics ==
In fiscal 2020, the station was used by an average of 861 passengers daily (boarding passengers only), and it ranked 154th among the busiest stations of JR Kyushu.

== Surrounding area ==
- Hoshigamine New Town
- Kagoshima City Hoshigamine Junior High School
- Kagoshima City Hoshigamine East Elementary School

== See also ==
- List of railway stations in Japan
