= Kōriyama, Kagoshima =

Dissolved municipality in Kagoshima prefecture, Japan

Kōriyama (郡山町, Kōriyama-chō) was a town located in Hioki District, Kagoshima Prefecture, Japan.

As of 2003, the town had an estimated population of 8,277 and the density of 143.32 persons per km^{2}. The total area was 57.75 km^{2}.

On November 1, 2004, Kōriyama, along with the town of Matsumoto (also from Hioki District), the town of Kiire (from Ibusuki District), and the towns of Sakurajima and Yoshida (both from Kagoshima District), was merged into the expanded city of Kagoshima and no longer exists as an independent municipality.
