= Yunomoto Station =

Railway station in Hioki, Kagoshima Prefecture, Japan

Yunomoto Station 湯之元駅
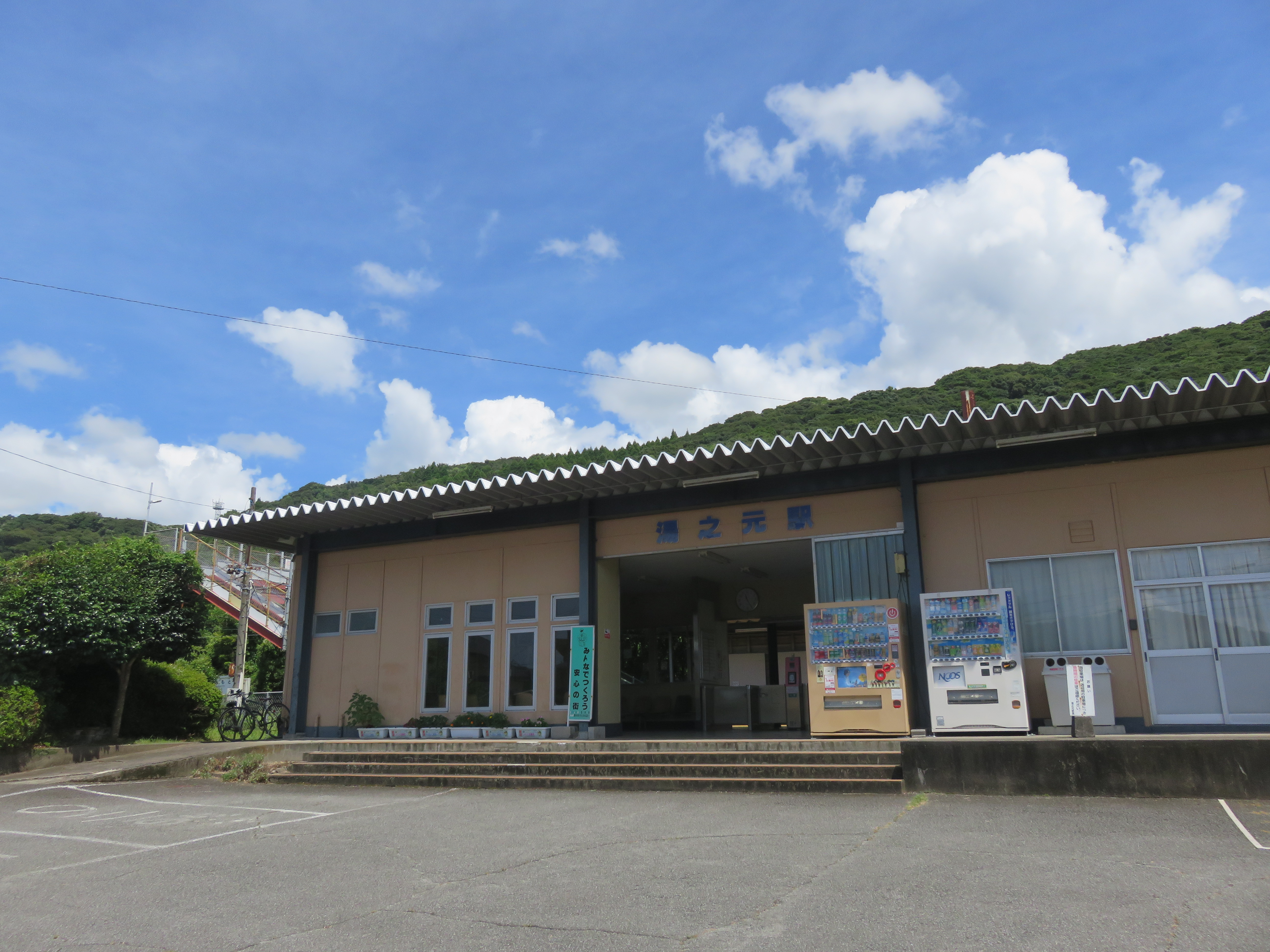
- Yunomoto Station in 2023

General information
- Location: Higashiichikicho Yuda, Hioki-shi, Kagoshima-ken 899-2201; Japan
- Coordinates: 31°40′26.10″N 130°20′12.35″E
- Operator: JR Kyushu
- Line: ■ Kagoshima Main Line
- Distance: 369.6 km from Mojikō
- Platforms: 2 side platforms

Other information
- Status: Staffed
- Website: Official website

History
- Opened: 15 December 1913

Passengers
- FY2020: 265 daily

Services
| Preceding station | JR Kyushu | Following station |
|---|---|---|
| Higashi-Ichiki towards Kagoshima | Kagoshima Main Line | Ichiki towards Mojikō |
Location
- Location within Kagoshima Prefecture Location within Japan

Yunomoto Station (湯之元駅, Yunomoto-eki) is a passenger railway station located in the city of Hioki, Kagoshima Prefecture, Japan. It is operated by JR Kyushu.

== Lines ==
The station is served by the Kagoshima Main Line and is located 369.6 km from the starting point of the line at Mojikō.

=== Layout ===
The station is an above-ground station with two parallel side platforms, connected to the station building by a footbridge. The station is staffed.

=== Platforms ===
| 1 | ■ ■ Kagoshima Main Line | for Sendai |
| 2 | ■ ■ Kagoshima Main Line | for Ijuin and Kagoshima-Chūō |

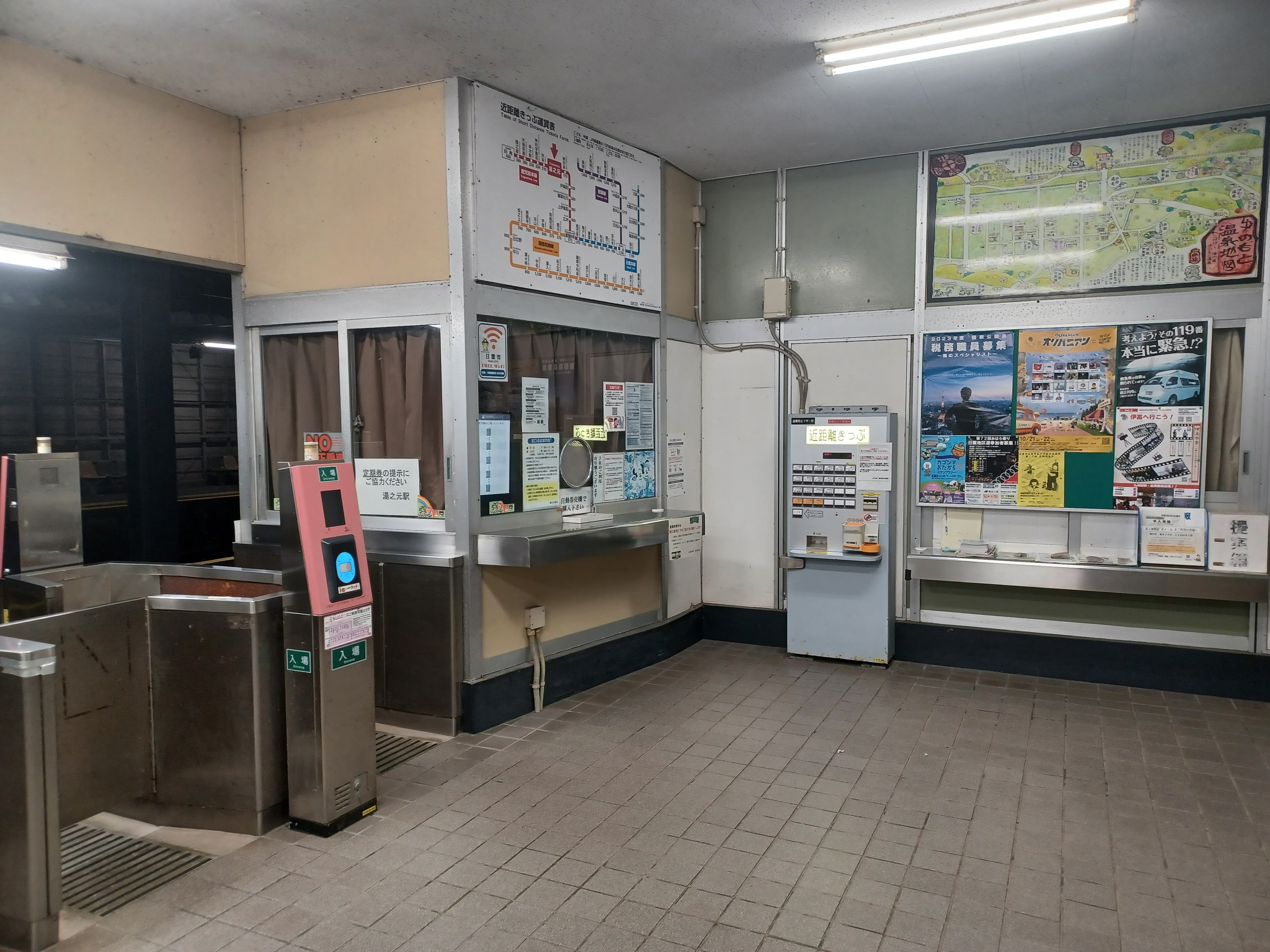
Inside the station building

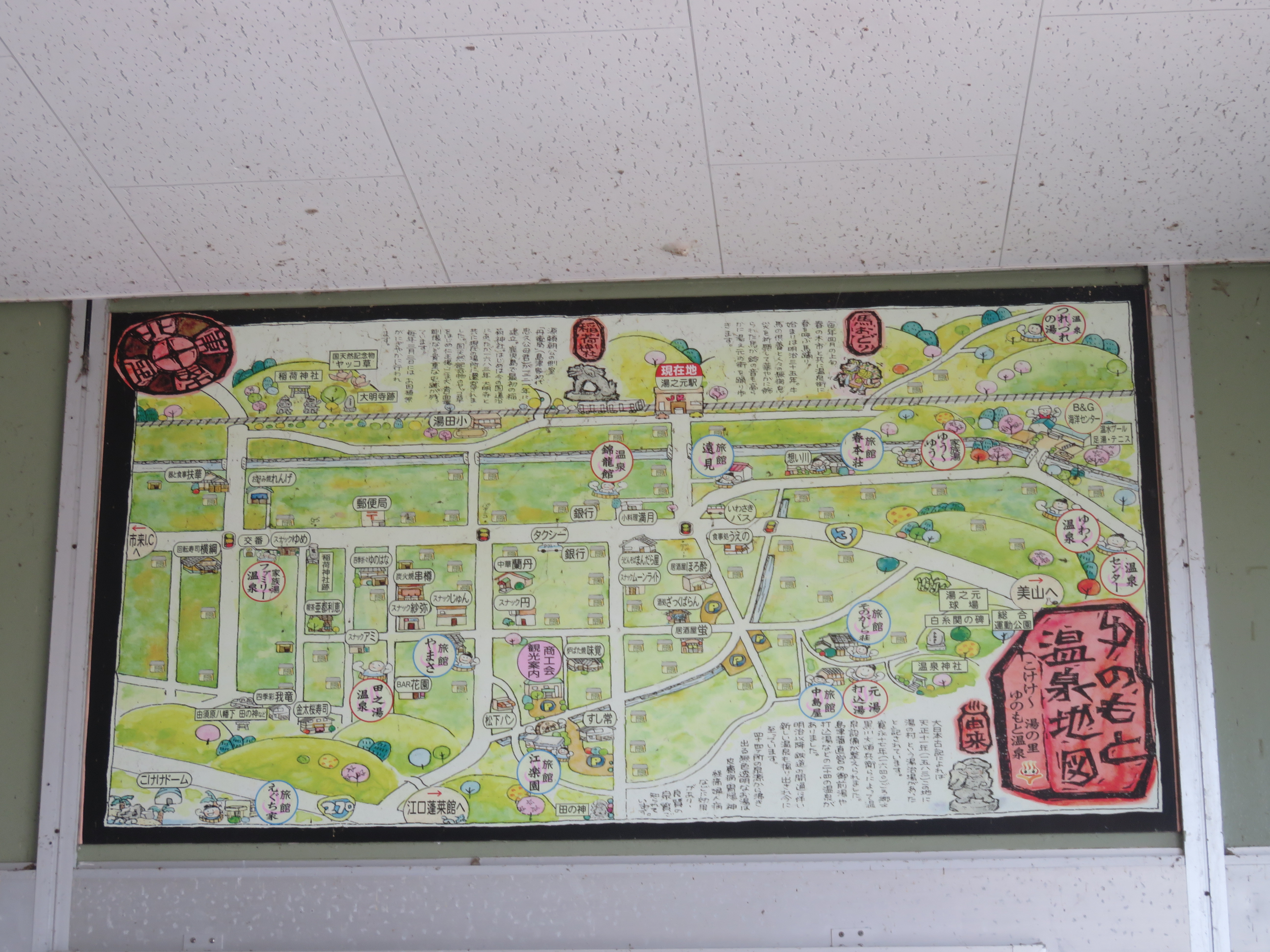
Map of Yunomoto Onsen

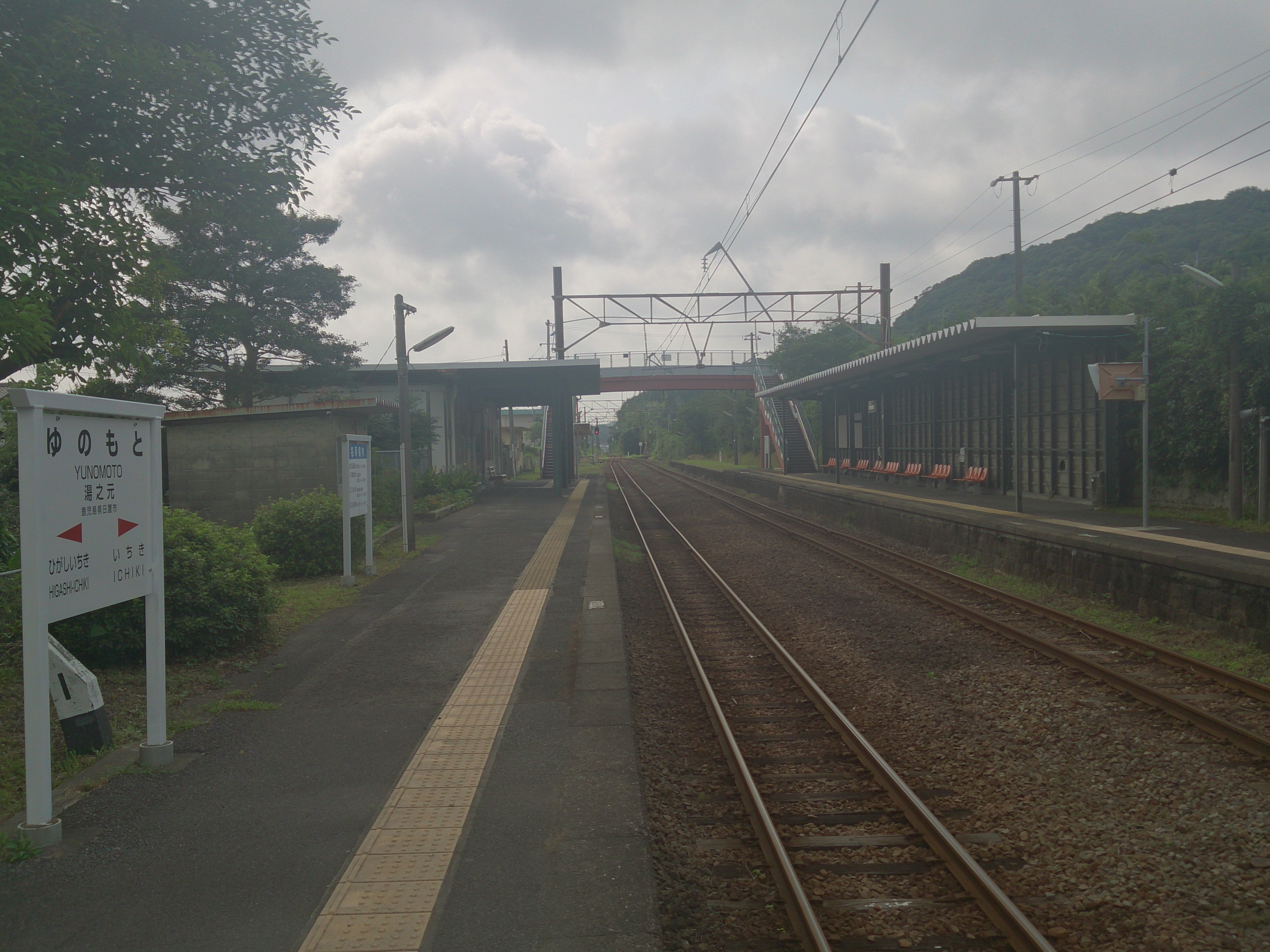
Platform (facing Sendai)

== History ==
The station was opened by Japanese Government Railways (JGR) on 15 December 1913. With the privatization of Japanese National Railways (JNR), the successor of JGR, on 1 April 1987, JR Kyushu took over control of the station.

== Passenger statistics ==
In fiscal 2020, the station was used by an average of 265 passengers daily (boarding passengers only), and it ranked 291st among the busiest stations of JR Kyushu.

== Surrounding area ==
- Hioki City Yuda Elementary School
- Yunomoto Onsen

== See also ==
- List of railway stations in Japan
