= Ei, Kagoshima =

Dissolved municipality in Kagoshima prefecture, Japan

Ei (頴娃町, Ei-chō) was a town located in Ibusuki District, Kagoshima Prefecture, Japan.

As of 2003, the town had an estimated population of 14,396 and the density of 130.50 persons per km^{2}. The total area was 110.31 km^{2}.

On December 1, 2007, Ei, along with the towns of Chiran and Kawanabe (both from Kawanabe District), was merged to form the new city of Minamikyūshū.

It is bounded by Kaimon in the west and Ibusuki in the south. It is accessed by the Ibusuki Skyline in the northeast.
