= Hioki District =

District in Kagoshima Prefecture, Japan

Hioki (日置郡, Hioki-gun) was a district located in Kagoshima Prefecture, Japan.

As of July 1, 2005, the district had an estimated population of 7,927 and the density of 109.72 persons per km^{2}. The total area was 72.25 km^{2}.

== District Timeline ==
- April 1, 1889 - Due to the municipal status enforcement, the villages of Kushikino, Nishiichiki, Higashiichiki, Shimoijūin, Nakaijūin, Kamijūin, Kōriyama, Hioki, Yoshitoshi and Nagayoshi were created within Hioki District. (10villages)
- March 29, 1896 - The district absorbed Ata District and added the villages of Izaku, Tabuse and Ata. (13 villages)
- April 1, 1922 - The village of Nakaijūin was elevated to town status to become the town of Ijūin. (1 town, 12 villages)
- December 1, 1922 - The village of Izaku was elevated to town status to become the town of Izaku. (2 towns, 11 villages)
- April 1. 1930 - The village of Nishiichiki was elevated to gain town status to become the town of Ichiki. (3 towns, 12 villages)
- April 1. 1935 - The village of Kushikino was elevated to town status to become the town of Kushikino. (4 towns, 11 villages)
- April 1. 1937 - The village of Higashiichiki was elevated to town status to become the town of Higashiichiki. (5 towns, 10 villages)
- October 1, 1950 - the town of Kushikino was elevated to city status.
- April 1, 1955: (6 towns, 8 villages)
  - The villages of Hioki and Yoshitoshi were merged into the town of Hiyoshi.
  - The village of Izaku and the town of Nagayoshi were merged into the town of Fukiage.
- September 30, 1956: (7 towns, 1 village)
  - The village of ShimoIjūin was splite into the towns of Higashiichiki, Ijūin, Hiyoshi and Kōriyama (respectively).
  - The village of Kōriyama was elevated to town status to become the town of Kōriyama.
  - The villages of Tabuse and Ata were merged into the town of Kinpō.
- April 1, 1960 - The village of Kamiijūin was elevated to town status to become the town of Matsumoto.(8 towns)
- November 1, 2004 - the towns of Kōriyama and Matsumoto, along with the town of Kiire (from Ibusuki District), and the towns of Sakurajima and Yoshida (both from Kagoshima District), were merged into the expanded city of Kagoshima.
- May 1, 2005 - the towns of Fukiage, Higashiichiki, Hiyoshi and Ijūin were merged to create the city of Hioki.
- October 11, 2005 - the town of Ichiki was merged with the city of Kushikino to create the city of Ichikikushikino.
- November 7, 2005 - the town of Kinpō, along with the city of Kaseda, and the towns of Bonotsu, Kasasa and Ōura (all from Kawanabe District), was merged to create city of Minamisatsuma. Hioki District was dissolved as a result of this merger.
