= Ibusuki (disambiguation) =

Ibusuki is a city in Kagoshima Prefecture, Japan.

Ibusuki may also refer to:

- Ibusuki District, Kagoshima, a former district located in Kagoshima Prefecture
- Ibusuki Station, a station in Ibusuki

== Surname ==
- Hiroshi Ibusuki, a Japanese professional footballer
