= Kiire, Kagoshima =

Dissolved municipality in Kagoshima prefecture, Japan

Kiire (喜入町, Kiire-chō) was a town located in Ibusuki District, Kagoshima Prefecture, Japan.

As of 2003, the town had an estimated population of 12,648 and the density of 206.57 persons per km^{2}. The total area was 61.23 km^{2}.

Kiire-chō consisted of 6 villages (North to South): Sesekushi, Nakamyō, Kiire (proper), Hitokura, Maenohama and Nukumi

In 2004 there was a debate and a vote as to which larger municipality Kiire should join -- Kagoshima City to the North or Ibusuki City to the South (see merger and dissolution of municipalities of Japan).

On November 1, 2004, Kiire, along with the towns of Kōriyama and Matsumoto (both from Hioki District), and the towns of Sakurajima and Yoshida (both from Kagoshima District), was merged into the expanded city of Kagoshima and no longer exists as an independent municipality.

Kiire is known for one of the largest oil storage facilities in Japan, located in Nakamyō village, Kiire Forest (Kiire no mori) north of Hitokura and Kiire Country Club, a golf club in the mountains north of the town.
