= Kawanabe, Kagoshima =

Town in Kagoshima Prefecture, Japan

Kawanabe (川辺町, Kawanabe-chō) was a town located in Kawanabe District, Kagoshima Prefecture, Japan.

As of 2003, the town had an estimated population of 15,121 and the density of 118.74 persons per km^{2}. The total area was 127.35 km^{2}.

On December 1, 2007, Kawanabe, along with the town of Ei (from Ibusuki District), and the town of Chiran (also from Kawanabe District), was merged to form the new city of Minamikyūshū.

== Travel ==
Prefecture road 16 is in front of Kawanabe high school. It joins national highway 225. Highway 225 continues straight to Kagoshima city. It is about 53 km from Kawanabe.

== Kawanabe High School ==
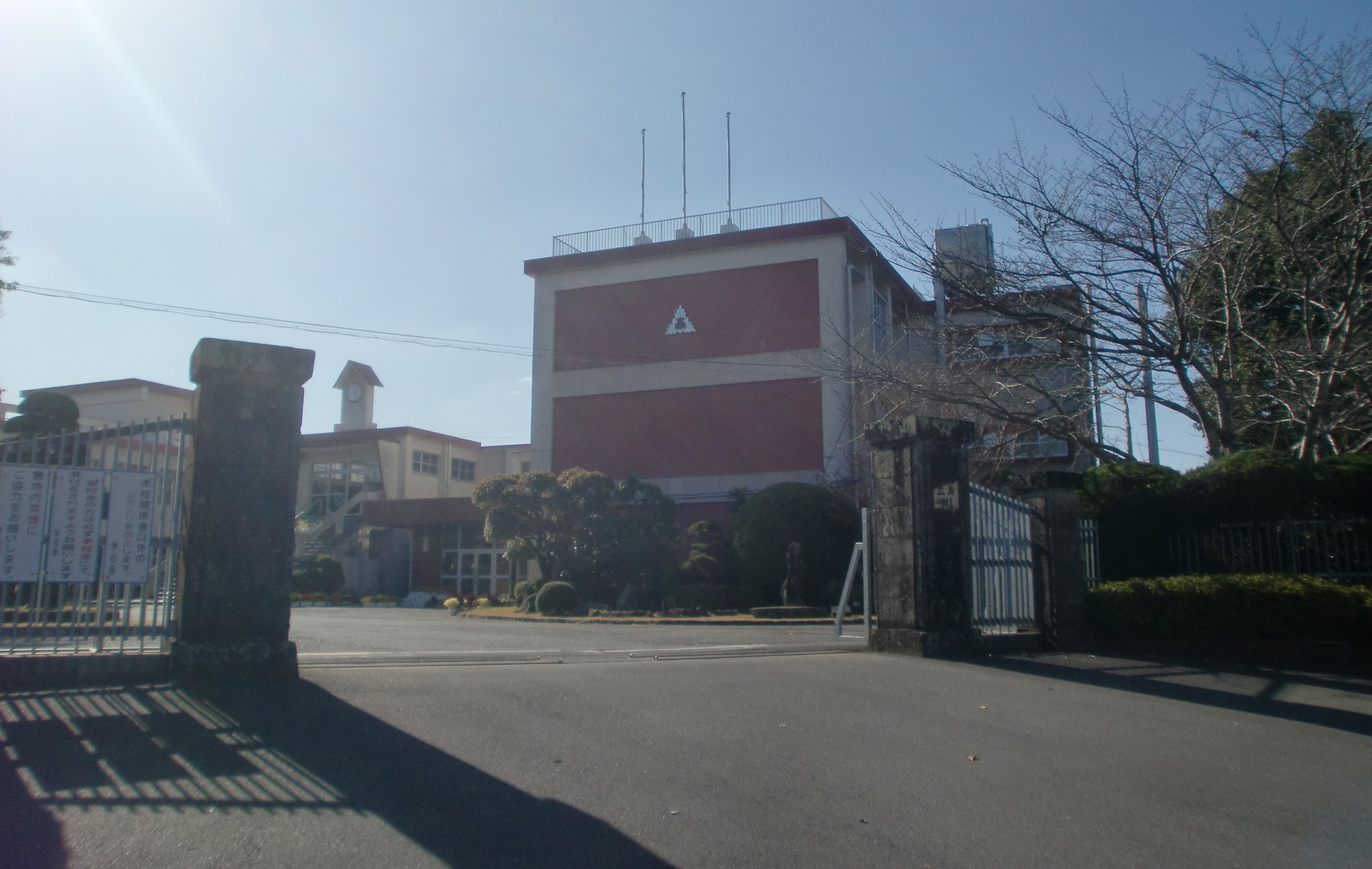
Kawanabe High School

Kawanabe high school is located at the center of the city. It has about 350 students. Many of the students choose to enter university. One of the characteristics of this school is the spirit of "Jingaryo". "Jingaryo" is the name of the hill in the school. Many school events are named after this spirit. For example, at the school festival called "Jingaryo festival", students create exhibitions related to school history. Graduates are proud of this spirit well after they leave school. Each year of graduates plants a tree and plaque to commemorate their time at Kawanabe. In school there are some clubs and students are eager to do various activities. For example, there is a symphonic band in the school. It has about 40 members. It got gold prizes 13 times continuously in Kagoshima prefectural contest. In 2011, four percussion players got silver prize in an ensemble contest in Kagoshima.

== Life ==
People in Kawanabe always separate garbage before they dump it, even what it is small. For example, they separate combustible garbage, incombustible garbage, plastic garbage, empty cans and empty bottles. So students in Kawanabe high school also separate garbage in their school days. Also in Kawanabe, the bricks used to make the sidewalk are made from the ash of burned garbage. Kawanabe is an environmentally friendly city.

== Food ==
Sweet potatoes are famously grown in and around Kawanabe, as in the rest of the Satsuma Peninsula in Kagoshima. There is a shop on Hirayama road in Kawanabe that makes sweet potato ice cream. Kurobuta (かごしま黒豚, lit. Kagoshima black pig) pork is also produced in Kawanabe.

== Buddhism ==
In the middle of the Kamakura period, family Buddhist altars became popular. They are called 仏壇 (butsudan) in Japanese. Early in the nineteenth century, these Buddhist altars the industry of making these altars started and became popular later. Today, it has become the base of Kawanabe Buddhist altar industry. Now there are many shops which sell Kawanabe Buddhist altars in Kawanabe.

== Festivals ==
Kawanabe Futsukaichi, a very famous festival in Kagoshima, has a history of about 230 years. On this day, many people visit. The main road in Kawanabe is closed to cars on festival days. Many street shops are opened during the festival. Buddhist altars are sold and there are many events.

== Notable residents ==
- Nijiro Tokuda - Japan's oldest man from July 2005 until June 2006.
