= Ibusuki District, Kagoshima =

Former district in Kagoshima prefecture, Japan

Coordinates: 31.2525°N 130.6338°E

Ibusuki (揖宿郡, Ibusuki-gun) was a district located in Kagoshima Prefecture, Japan.

As of 2005 population data (following the January 1, 2006 merger), the district had an estimated population of 14,761 and a density of 134 persons per km^{2}. The total area was 110.31 km^{2} (42.59 sq mi).

The day before the dissolution on November 30, 2007, the district had only one town:

- Ei (頴娃町, Ei-chō)

== District Timeline ==
- On October 15, 1956 - the village of Kiire was elevated to town status.
- On November 1, 2004 - the town of Kiire, along with the towns of Kōriyama and Matsumoto (both from Hioki District), and the towns of Sakurajima and Yoshida (both from Kagoshima District), was merged with the expanded city of Kagoshima.
- On January 1, 2006 - the towns of Kaimon and Yamagawa were merged into the expanded city of Ibusuki.
- On December 1, 2007 - the town of Ei, along with the towns of Chiran and Kawanabe (both from Kawanabe District), was merged to create the city of Minamikyūshū. Ibusuki District was dissolved as a result of this merger.
