= Higashiichiki, Kagoshima =

Dissolved municipality in Kagoshima prefecture, Japan

Higashiichiki (東市来町, Higashiichiki-chō) was a town located in Hioki District, Kagoshima Prefecture, Japan.

As of 2003, the town had an estimated population of 13,565 and the density of 191.33 persons per km^{2}. The total area was 70.90 km^{2}.

On May 1, 2005, Higashiichiki, along with the towns of Fukiage, Hiyoshi and Ijūin (all from Hioki District), was merged to create the city of Hioki and no longer exists as an independent municipality.
