= Kami-Ijūin Station =

Railway station in Kagoshima, Kagoshima Prefecture, Japan

Kami-Ijūin Station 上伊集院駅
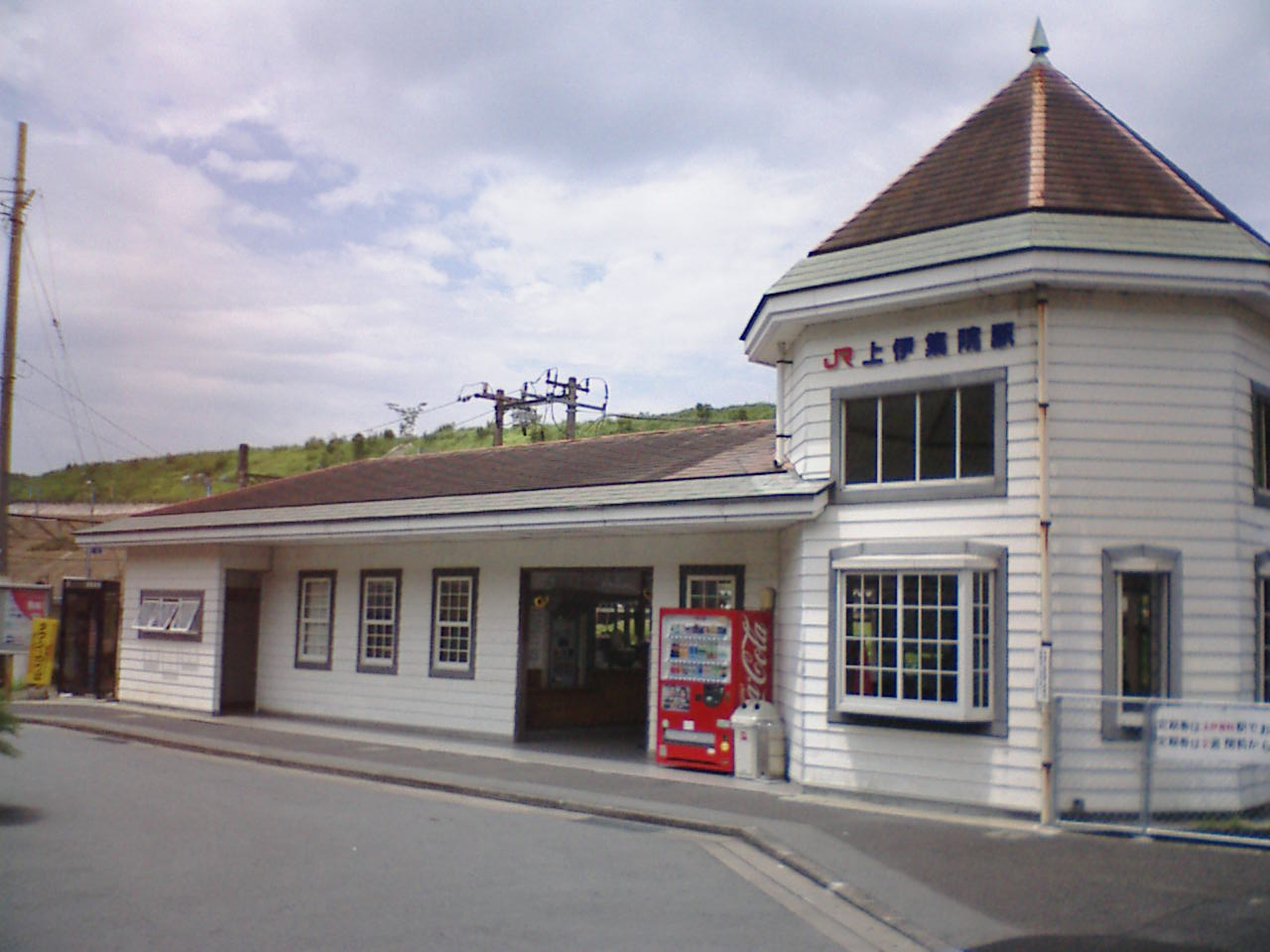
- Kami-Ijūin Station

General information
- Location: Kamitaniguchicho, Kagoshima-shi, Kagoshima-ken,899-2703; Japan
- Coordinates: 31°35′37.9″N 130°27′34.2″E
- Operator: JR Kyushu
- Line: ■ Kagoshima Main Line
- Distance: 385.7km from Mojikō
- Platforms: 1 side + 1island platform

Other information
- Status: Staffed
- Website: Official website

History
- Opened: October 11, 1913

Passengers
- FY2020: 1501 daily

Services
Preceding station	JR Kyushu	Following station
Hiroki towards Kagoshima	Kagoshima Main Line	Satsuma-Matsumoto towards Mojikō
Location
- Location within Kagoshima Prefecture Location within Japan

Kami-Ijūin Station (上伊集院駅, Kami-Ijūin-eki) is a passenger railway station located in the city of Kagoshima, Kagoshima Prefecture, Japan. It is operated by JR Kyushu.

== Lines ==
The station is served by the Kagoshima Main Line and is located 385.7 km from the starting point of the line at Mojikō.

=== Layout ===
The station is an above-ground station with one side platform and one island platform; however, one side of the island platform is not in use. The station building on the platform is connected to the platform by a footbridge. The station is staffed.

=== Platforms ===
1	■ ■ Kagoshima Main Line	for Ijuin and Sendai
2	■ ■ Kagoshima Main Line	for Kagoshima-Chūō

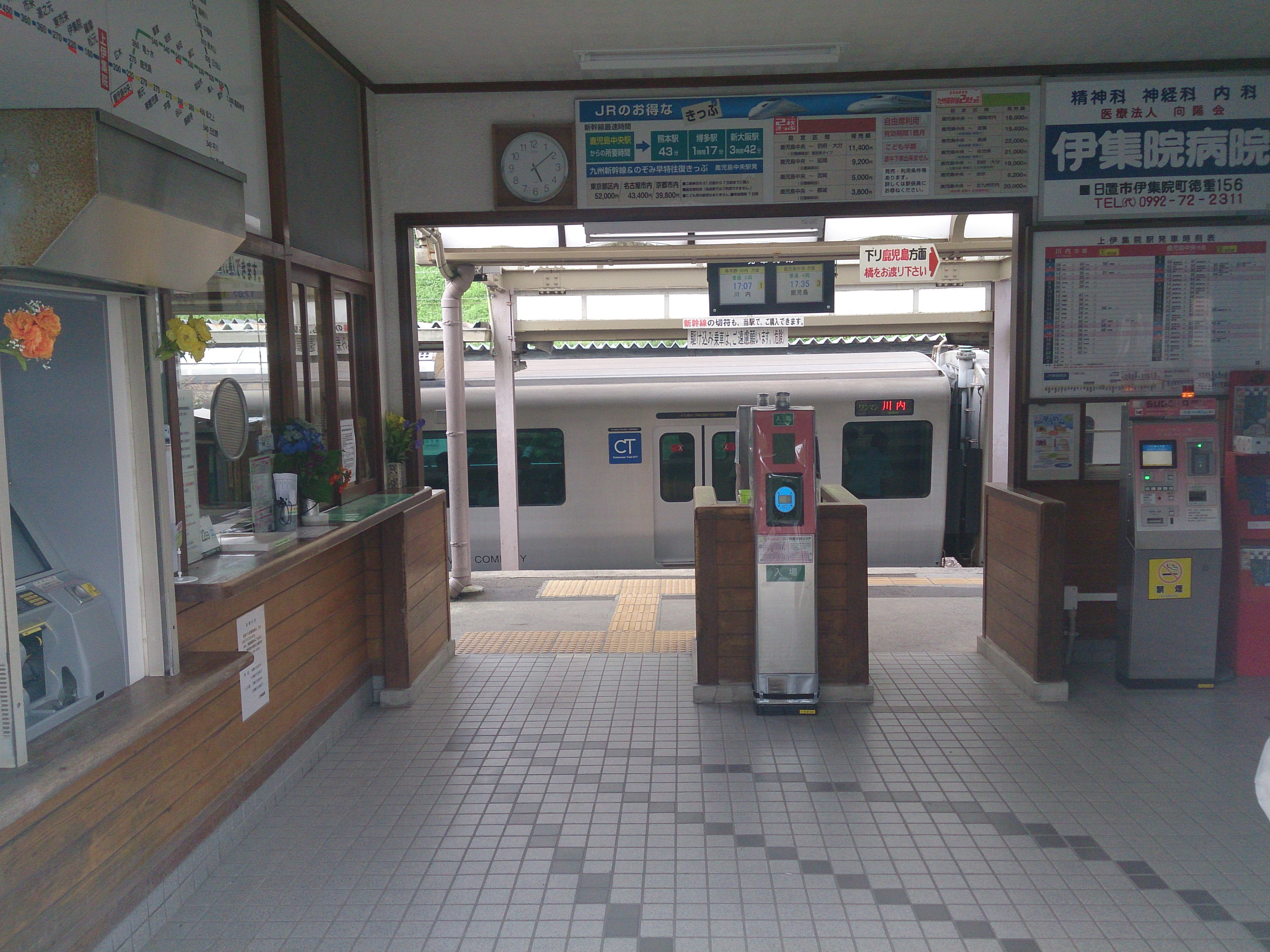
Inside the station building

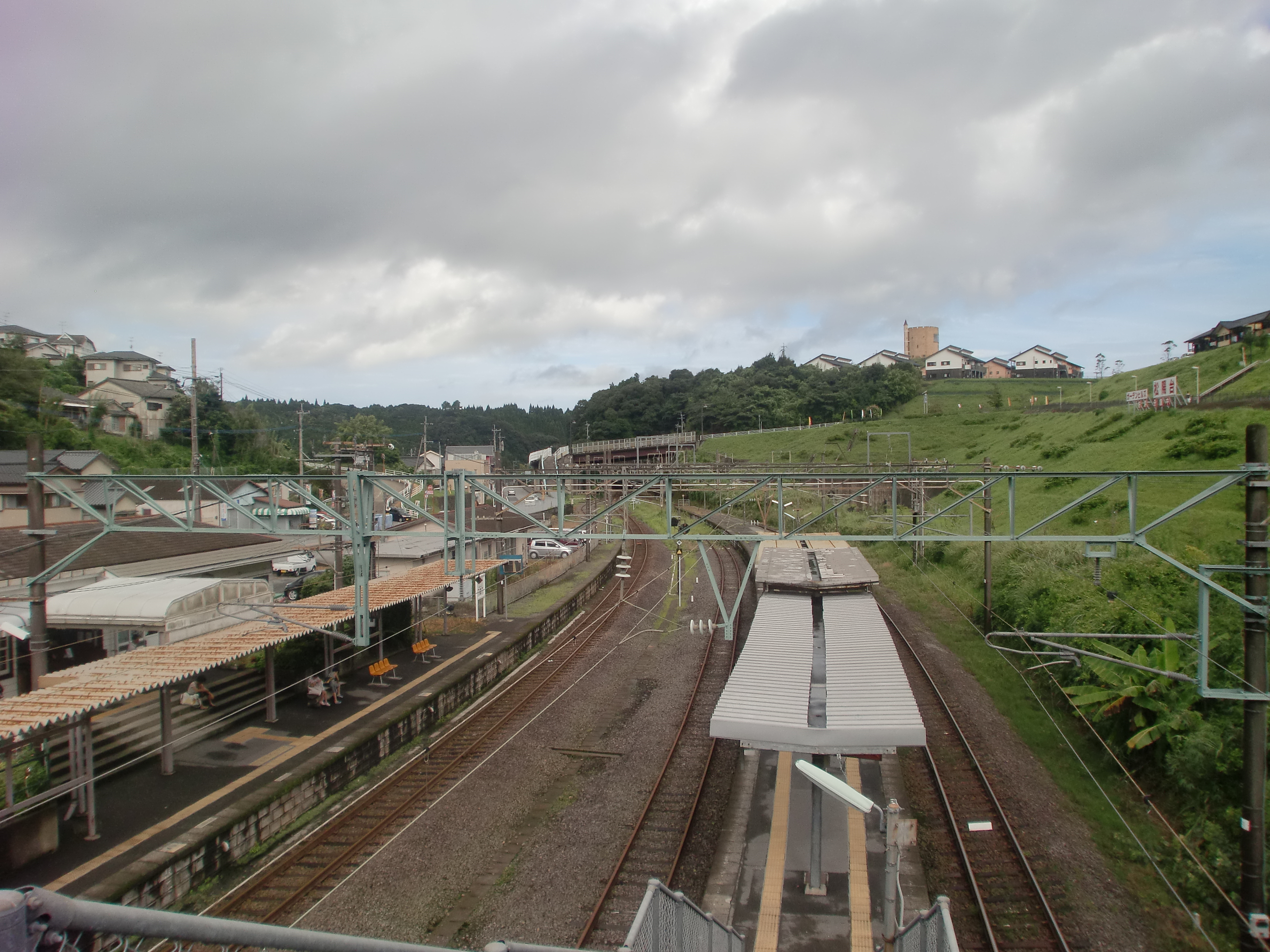
Platforms from footbridge

== History ==
The station was opened by Japanese Government Railways (JGR) on 11 October 1913 as Manjuishi Station (饅頭石駅) on the Sendai Line. The Line was renamed the Sendai Main Line in 1924 and became part of the Kagoshima Main Line in 1927. The station name was changed to its present name on 15 December 1949. In 1985 Shoyo High School opened near Kami-Ijuin Station, and the resulting increase in passenger numbers caused the station building to become too small, so it was replaced with the current building. With the privatization of Japanese National Railways (JNR), the successor of JGR, on 1 April 1987, JR Kyushu took over control of the station.

== Passenger statistics ==
In fiscal 2020, the station was used by an average of 1501 passengers daily (boarding passengers only), and it ranked 98th among the busiest stations of JR Kyushu.

== Surrounding area ==
- Kami-Ijuin Post Office
- Kagoshima Prefectural Shoyo High School
- Manjuishi

== See also ==
- List of railway stations in Japan
