= Kawanabe District, Kagoshima =

District in Kagoshima Prefecture, Japan

Kawanabe (川辺郡, Kawanabe-gun) was a district located in Kagoshima Prefecture, Japan.

As of 2003, the district had an estimated population of 28,788 and a total area of 247.54 km^{2}.

The day before the dissolution on November 30, 2007, the district had two towns:

- Chiran (知覧町, Chiran-chō)
- Kawanabe (川辺町, Kawanabe-chō)

On December 1, 2007, the towns of Chiran and Kawanabe, along with the town of Ei (from Ibusuki District), were merged to create the city of Minamikyūshū. Kawanabe District was dissolved as a result of this merger.

== Traveling in Kawanabe ==
Prefecture road 16 is in front of Kawanabe high school. It joins national highway 225. Highway 225 continues straight to Kagoshima city. It is about 53 km from Kawanabe.

== Kawanabe High School ==
Kawanabe high school is located at the center of the city. It has about 450 students. Many of the students choose to enter university. One of the characteristics of this school is the spirit of "Jingaryo". "Jingaryo" is the name of the hill in the school. Many school events are named after this spirit. For example, at the school festival called "Jingaryo festival", students make some exhibitions related to school history. Each year of graduates plants a tree and plaque to commemorate their time at Kawanabe. In school there are some clubs and students are eager to do various activities. For example, there is a symphonic band in the school. It has about 50 members. It got gold prizes 13 times continuously in Kagoshima prefectural contest. In 2010, saxophone four players got gold prize in an ensemble contest in Kagoshima.

== Buddhism in Kawanabe ==
In the middle of the Kamakura period, family Buddhist altars became popular. They are called 仏壇 (butsudan) in Japanese. Early in the nineteenth century, these Buddhist altars the industry of making these altars started and became popular later. Today, it has become the base of Kawanabe Buddhist altar industry. Now there are many shops which sell Kawanabe Buddhist altars in Kawanabe.

== Timeline ==
- April 1, 1889 - Due to the municipal status enforcement, the villages of Kaseda, Nishikaseda, Higashikaseda, Higashinanpo, Nishinanpo, Katsume and Kawanabe were formed in Kawanabe District. (7 villages)
- March 29, 1896 - The villages of Chiran (from Kiire District) was moved to Kawanabe District. (8 villages)
- January 1, 1923 - The village of Nishikaseda was renamed to the village of Kasasa.
- July 1, 1923 - The village of Higashinanpo(?) was elevated to town status and renamed to become the town of Makurazaki. (1 town, 7 villages)
- October 13, 1923 - The village of Kawanabe was elevated to town status to become the town of Kawanabe. (2 towns, 6 villages)
- January 1, 1924 - The village of Kaseda was elevated to town status to become the town of Kaseda.(3 towns, 5 villages)
- January 1, 1925 - The village of Higashikaseda was elevated to town status and renamed to become the town of Bansei. (4 towns, 4 villages)
- April 1, 1932 - The village of Chiran was elevated to town status to become the town of Chiran. (5 towns, 3 villages)
- October 10, 1940 - The village of Kasasa was elevated to town status to become the town of Kasasa. (6 towns, 2 villages)
- September 1, 1949 - The town of Makurazaki was elevated to city status to become the city of Makurazaki. (5 towns, 2 villages)
- April 1, 1951 - The village of Ōura was broken off from the town of Kasasa. (5 towns, 3 villages)
- October 15, 1953 - The village of Nishinanpo(?) was renamed to the village of Bonotsu.
- July 15, 1954 - The towns of Kaseda and Bansei were merged to create the city of Kaseda. (3 towns, 3 villages)
- November 1, 1955 - The village of Bonotsu was elevated to town status to become the town of Bonotsu.(4 towns, 2 villages)
- September 1, 1956 - The town of Kawanabe, and the village of Katsume were merged to create the town of Kawanabe. (4 towns, 1 village)
- November 1, 1961 - The village of Ōura was elevated to town status to become the town of Ōura.(5 towns)
- November 7, 2005 - The towns of Bonotsu, Kasasa and Ōura, along with the city of Kaseda, and the town of Kinpō (from Hioki District) were merged to create the city of Minamisatsuma. (2 towns)
- December 1, 2007 - The towns of Chiran and Kawanabe, along with the town of Ei (from Ibusuki District), were merged to create the city of Minamikyūshū. Kawanabe District was dissolved as a result of this merger.

== See also ==
- Kawabe District, Akita
- Kawabe District, Hyōgo
