= Higashi-Ichiki Station =

Railway station in Hioki, Kagoshima Prefecture, Japan

Higashi-Ichiki Station 東市来駅
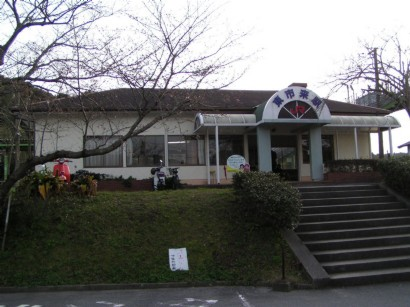
- Higashi-Ichiki Station

General information
- Location: Higashiichikicho Nagasato, Hioki-shi, Kagoshima-ken 899-2202; Japan
- Coordinates: 31°39′18″N 130°20′52″E
- Operator: JR Kyushu
- Line: ■ Kagoshima Main Line
- Distance: 372.1 km from Mojikō
- Platforms: 2 island platform

Other information
- Status: Staffed
- Website: Official website

History
- Opened: 11 October 1913

Passengers
- FY2020: 265 daily

Services
Preceding station	JR Kyushu	Following station
Ijūin towards Kagoshima	Kagoshima Main Line	Yunomoto towards Mojikō
Location
- Location within Kagoshima Prefecture Location within Japan

Higashi-Ichiki Station (東市来駅, Higashi-Ichiki-eki)is a passenger railway station located in the city of Hioki, Kagoshima Prefecture, Japan. It is operated by JR Kyushu.

== Lines ==
The station is served by the Kagoshima Main Line and is located 372.1 km from the starting point of the line at Mojikō.

=== Layout ===
The station is an above-ground station with one island platform, connected to the station building by a footbridge. The station is staffed.

=== Platforms ===
1	■ ■ Kagoshima Main Line	for Ijuin and Kagoshima-Chūō
2	■ ■ Kagoshima Main Line	for Sendai

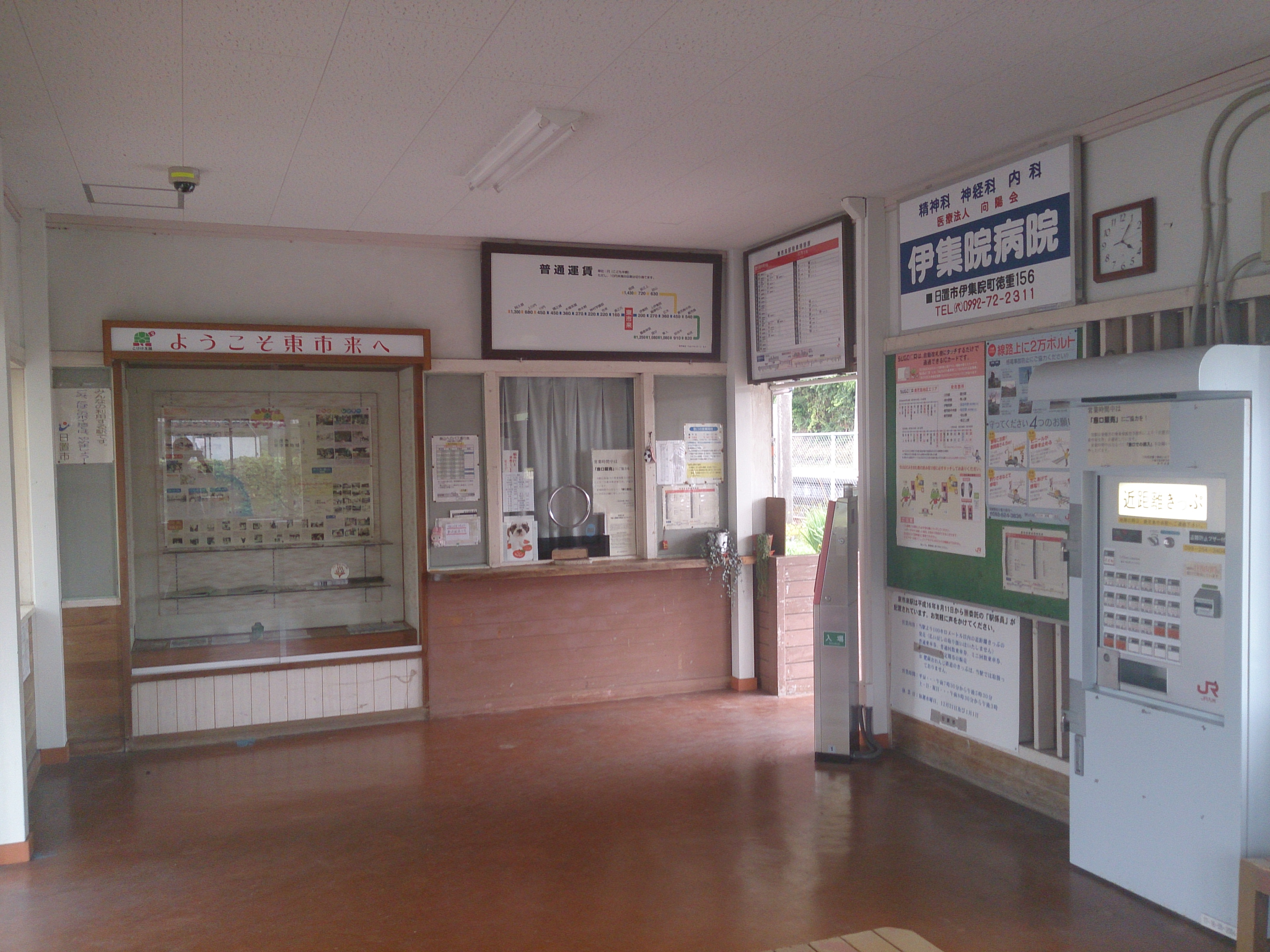
Inside the station building

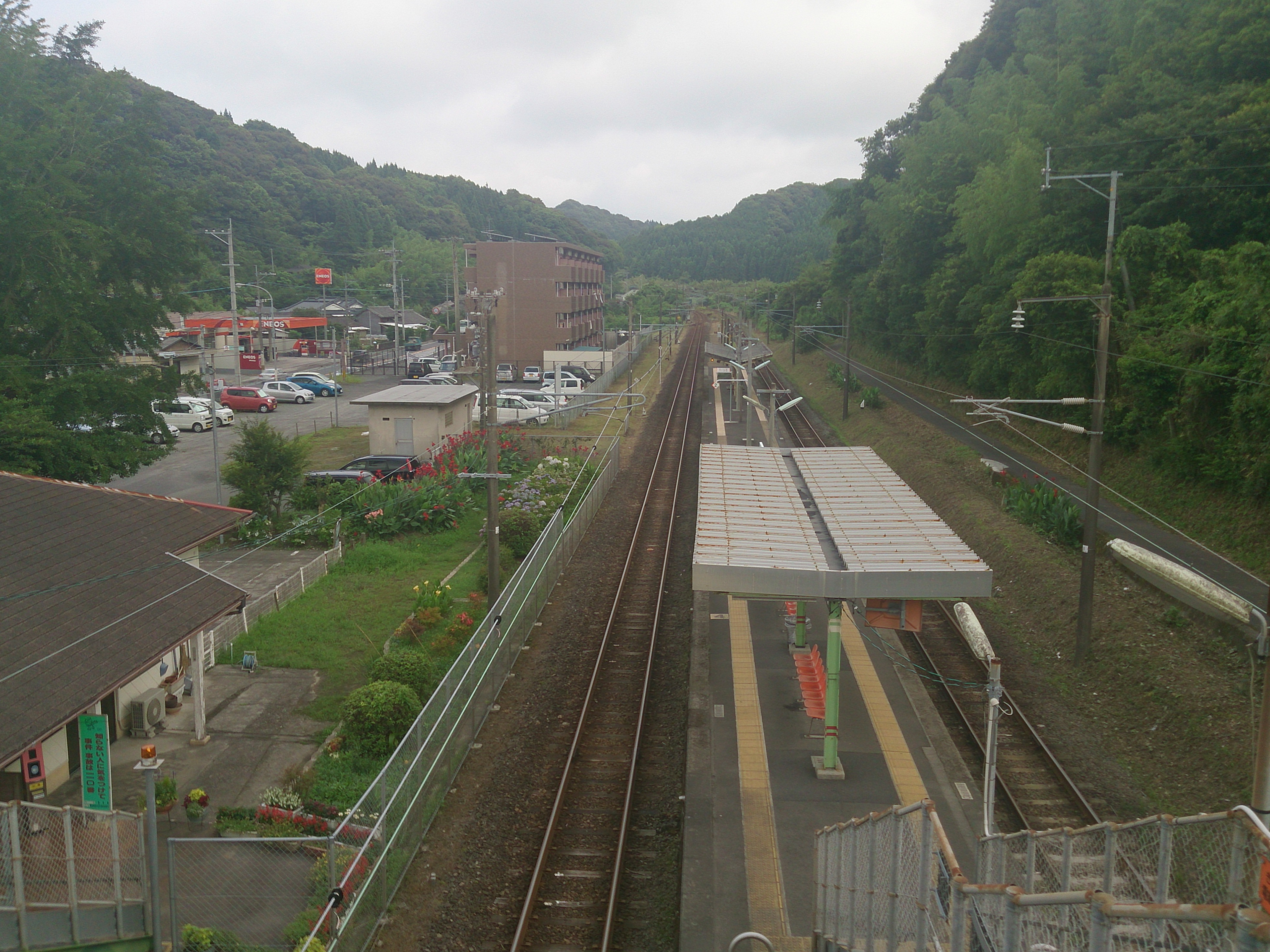
Platform from the footbridge（facing Kagoshima）

== History ==
The station was opened by Japanese Government Railways (JGR) on 11 October 1913. With the privatization of Japanese National Railways (JNR), the successor of JGR, on 1 April 1987, JR Kyushu took over control of the station.

== Passenger statistics ==
In fiscal 2020, the station was used by an average of 265 passengers daily (boarding passengers only), and it ranked 291st among the busiest stations of JR Kyushu.

== Surrounding area ==
- Ichiki Tsurumaru Castle Ruins
- Miyama (Birthplace of Satsuma ware)
- Togo Shigenori Memorial Museum
- Hioki City Higashiichiki Branch Office (former Higashiichiki Town Hall)

== See also ==
- List of railway stations in Japan
