= Hiyoshi, Kagoshima =

Dissolved municipality in Kagoshima prefecture, Japan

Hiyoshi (日吉町, Hiyoshi-chō) was a town located in Hioki District, Kagoshima Prefecture, Japan.

As of 2003, the town had an estimated population of 5,810 and the density of 198.63 persons per km^{2}. The total area was 29.25 km^{2}.

On May 1, 2005, Hiyoshi, along with the towns of Fukiage, Higashiichiki and Ijūin (all from Hioki District), was merged to create the city of Hioki and no longer exists as an independent municipality.
