= Yamagawa, Kagoshima =

Town in Japan

Yamagawa (山川町, Yamagawa-chō) was a town located in Ibusuki District, Kagoshima Prefecture, Japan. This town is known for its fisheries, and is well known for its fish Katsuo.

As of 2003, the town had an estimated population of 10,467 and the density of 281.52 persons per km^{2}. The total area was 37.18 km^{2}.

On January 1, 2006, Yamagawa, along with the town of Kaimon (also from Ibusuki District), was merged into the expanded city of Ibusuki and no longer exists as an independent municipality.
