= Ijūin, Kagoshima =

Dissolved municipality in Hioki district, Kagoshima prefecture, Japan

Ijūin (伊集院町, Ijūin-chō) was a town located in Hioki District, Kagoshima Prefecture, Japan.

In 2003, the town had an estimated population of 24,175 and the density of 433.01 persons per km^{2}. The total area was 55.83 km^{2}.

On May 1, 2005, Ijūin was merged with Fukiage, Higashiichiki and Hiyoshi (all from Hioki District) to create the city of Hioki. Ijūin no longer exists as an independent municipality.
