= Hioki =

Hioki 日置市
- City
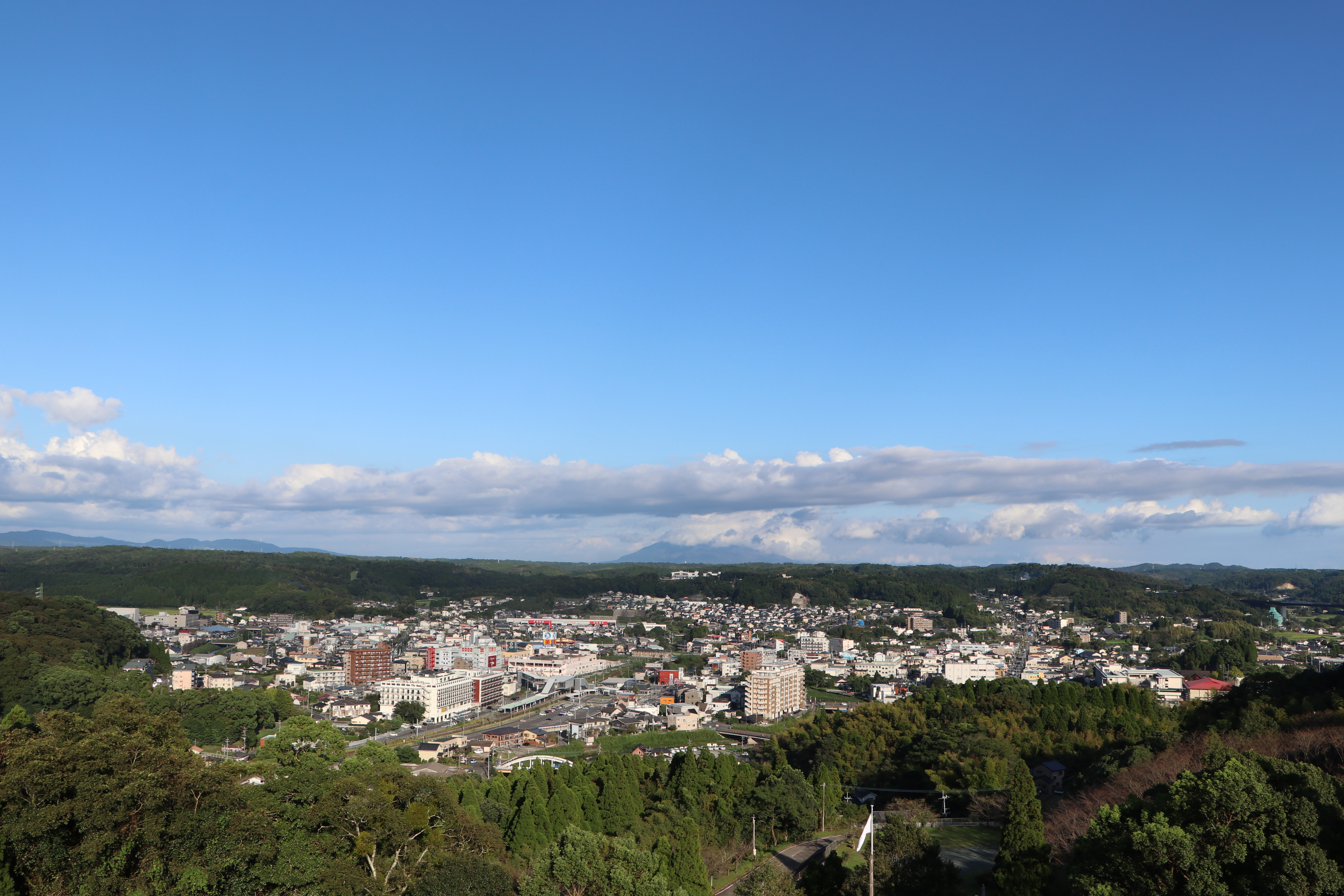
- Ijūin city from the Joyama Park in 2020

- Flag Emblem
- Interactive map of Hioki
- Location in Japan
- Coordinates: 31°38′01″N 130°24′09″E
- Country: Japan
- Region: Kyushu
- Prefecture: Kagoshima

Government
  - Mayor: Takamitsu Miyaji

Area
  - Total: 253.01 km^{2} (97.69 sq mi)

Population (July 1, 2024)
  - Total: 46,348
  - Density: 183.19/km^{2} (474.45/sq mi)
- Time zone: UTC+09:00 (JST)
- City hall address: 1-100 Kori Ijuin-machi, Hioki-shi, Kagoshima-ken 899-2592
- Climate: Cfa
- Website: Official website
- Symbols
- Flower: Prunus mume
- Tree: Pinus thunbergii

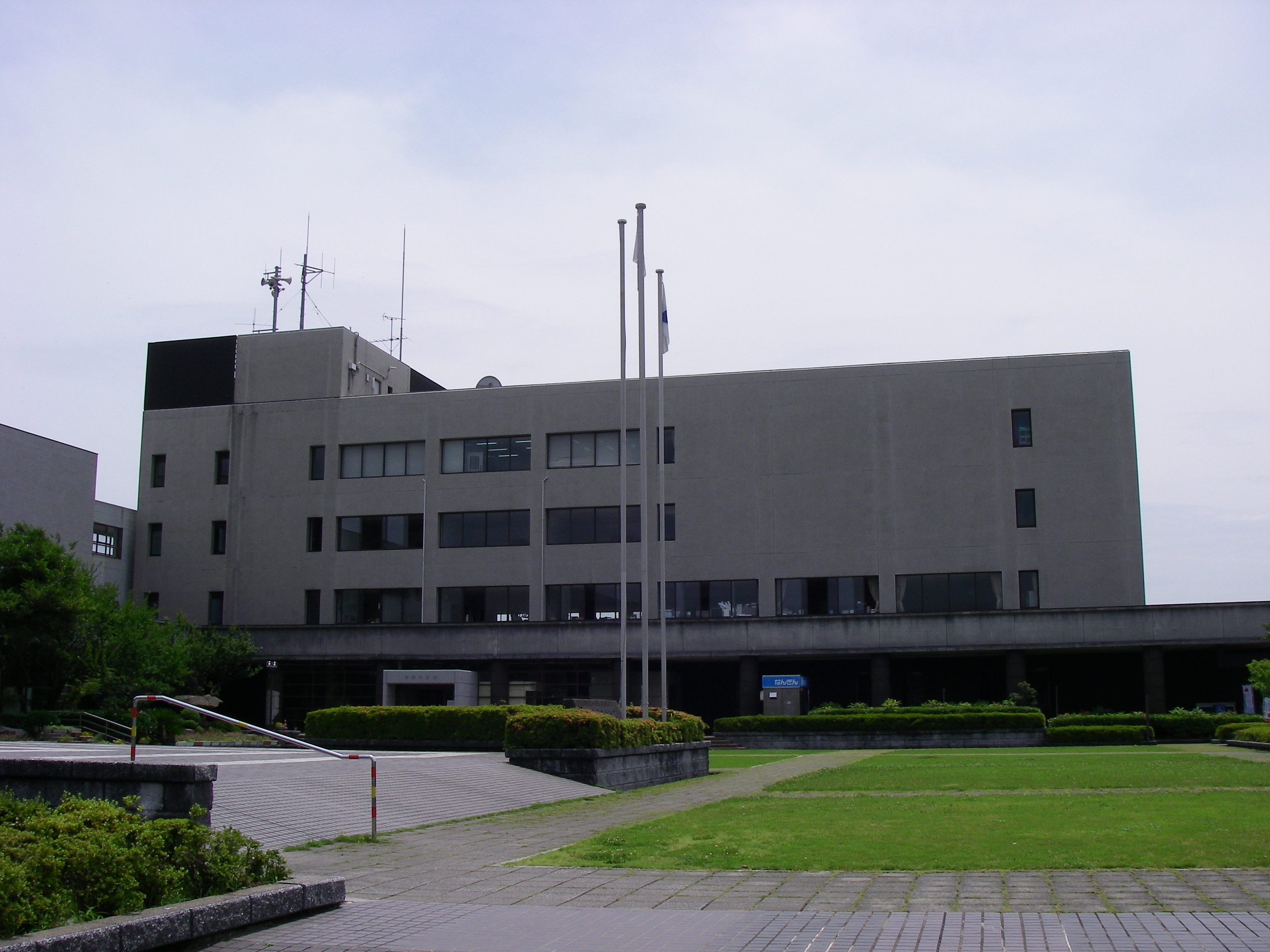
Hioki City Hall

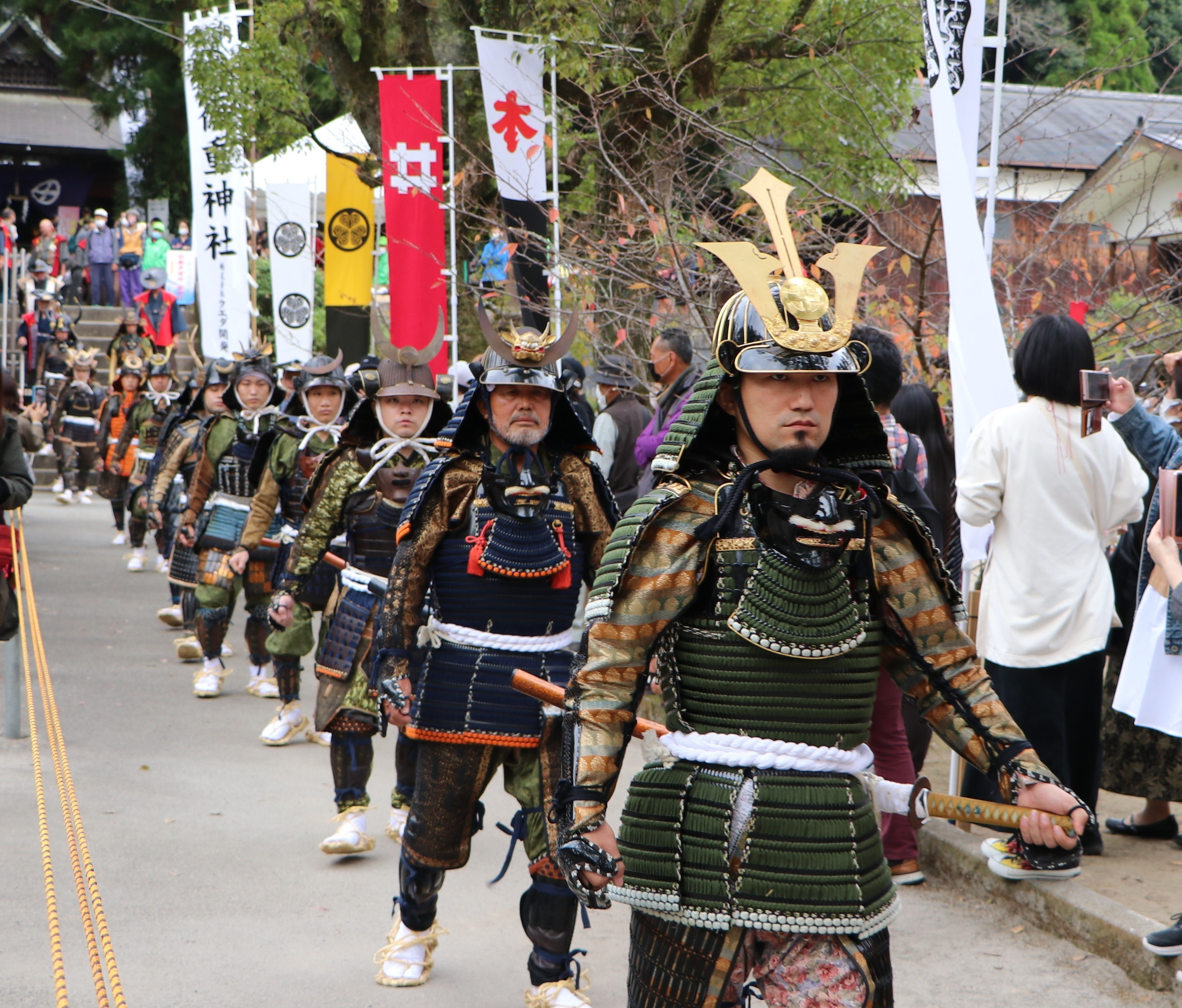
Myoenji Mairi Samurai Procession with Tokushige Shrine

Hioki (日置市, Hioki-shi) is a city in Kagoshima Prefecture, Japan. As of 1 July 2024, the city had an estimated population of 45,720 in 22560 households, and a population density of 180 persons per km^{2}. The total area of the city is 253.01 km^{2} (97.69 sq mi).

== Geography ==
Hioki is located in the central part of Kagoshima Prefecture, in the mid-west of the Satsuma Peninsula. The western part of the city faces the East China Sea, and is home to Fukiagehama Beach, one of Japan's three largest sand dunes. Kutajima Island, an uninhabited island about 12 kilometers offshore from Fukiagehama, is within the city limits.

=== Adjacent municipalities ===
Kagoshima Prefecture

- Ichikikushikino
- Kagoshima
- Minamisatsuma
- Satsumasendai

=== Climate ===
Hioki has a humid subtropical climate (Köppen climate classification Cfa) with hot summers and mild winters. Precipitation is significant throughout the year, and is heavier in summer, especially the months of June and July. The average annual temperature in Hioki is 17.3 °C (63.1 °F). The average annual rainfall is 2,265.0 mm (89.17 in) with June as the wettest month. The temperatures are highest on average in August, at around 27.3 °C (81.1 °F), and lowest in January, at around 7.5 °C (45.5 °F). Its record high is 38.6 °C (101.5 °F), reached on 3 August 2026, and its record low is −6.3 °C (20.7 °F), reached on 19 February 1977.

Climate data for Higashiichiki, Hioki (1991−2020 normals, extremes 1977−present)
Month	Jan	Feb	Mar	Apr	May	Jun	Jul	Aug	Sep	Oct	Nov	Dec	Year
Record high °C (°F)	22.5 (72.5)	23.2 (73.8)	25.2 (77.4)	29.4 (84.9)	31.8 (89.2)	34.4 (93.9)	36.4 (97.5)	38.6 (101.5)	35.5 (95.9)	32.9 (91.2)	28.1 (82.6)	23.6 (74.5)	38.6 (101.5)
Mean daily maximum °C (°F)	12.0 (53.6)	13.3 (55.9)	16.1 (61.0)	20.4 (68.7)	24.1 (75.4)	26.4 (79.5)	30.2 (86.4)	31.6 (88.9)	29.3 (84.7)	25.1 (77.2)	19.8 (67.6)	14.4 (57.9)	21.9 (71.4)
Daily mean °C (°F)	7.5 (45.5)	8.6 (47.5)	11.5 (52.7)	15.6 (60.1)	19.4 (66.9)	22.8 (73.0)	26.6 (79.9)	27.3 (81.1)	24.6 (76.3)	19.8 (67.6)	14.6 (58.3)	9.5 (49.1)	17.3 (63.2)
Mean daily minimum °C (°F)	2.9 (37.2)	3.6 (38.5)	6.4 (43.5)	10.5 (50.9)	14.8 (58.6)	19.6 (67.3)	23.6 (74.5)	23.9 (75.0)	20.7 (69.3)	15.0 (59.0)	9.5 (49.1)	4.7 (40.5)	12.9 (55.3)
Record low °C (°F)	−5.4 (22.3)	−6.3 (20.7)	−3.4 (25.9)	−0.1 (31.8)	5.4 (41.7)	11.0 (51.8)	17.0 (62.6)	16.4 (61.5)	10.0 (50.0)	1.6 (34.9)	−2.1 (28.2)	−4.2 (24.4)	−6.3 (20.7)
Average precipitation mm (inches)	75.8 (2.98)	99.4 (3.91)	151.1 (5.95)	174.3 (6.86)	187.1 (7.37)	516.3 (20.33)	310.2 (12.21)	240.6 (9.47)	243.6 (9.59)	92.2 (3.63)	111.4 (4.39)	98.4 (3.87)	2,265 (89.17)
Average precipitation days (≥ 1.0 mm)	10.2	9.6	12.3	10.2	10.0	15.1	10.9	10.3	10.2	7.2	9.0	9.5	124.5
Mean monthly sunshine hours	116.1	133.3	162.3	180.6	183.9	112.0	192.5	220.8	186.7	191.2	156.1	126.2	1,964.9
Source: Japan Meteorological Agency

== Demographics ==
Per Japanese census data, the population of Hioki in 2020 is 47,153 people. Hioki began its first census in 1960, and the brief exodus ended in the 1970s, after which the population remained relatively stable until 2020.

Historical population

Year	Pop.	±%
1960	67,756	—
1965	60,027	−11.4%
1970	54,656	−8.9%
1975	52,250	−4.4%
1980	52,022	−0.4%
1985	53,025	+1.9%
1990	52,675	−0.7%

Year	Pop.	±%
1995	52,791	+0.2%
2000	53,391	+1.1%
2005	52,411	−1.8%
2010	50,831	−3.0%
2015	49,249	−3.1%
2020	47,153	−4.3%

Hioki population statistics

== History ==
Hioki is part of ancient Satsuma Province and was one of the centers of the Shimazu clan during the Kamakura and Muromachi periods. It was part of the holdings of Satsuma Domain in the Edo period. On April 1, 1889, the villages of Nakaijuin, Shimoijuin, Higashiichiki, Hioki, Yoshiri, Nagayoshi in Hiki District and Isaku in Ata District were established with the creation of the modern municipalities system. Nakaijuin was raised to town status in April 1922, becoming the town of Ijuin, followed by Isaku in December 1922 and Higashiichiki in April 1937. Hioki and Yoshiri merged in April1955 to form the town of Hiyoshi ad Isaku and Nagayoshi merged to form the town of Fukiage. The city of Hioki was established on May 1, 2005, from the merger of the towns of Fukiage, Higashiichiki, Hiyoshi and Ijūin (all from Hioki District).

== Government ==
Hioki has a mayor-council form of government with a directly elected mayor and a unicameral city council of 20 members. Hioki contributes two members to the Kagoshima Prefectural Assembly. In terms of national politics, the city is part of the Kagoshima 3rd district of the lower house of the Diet of Japan.

== Economy ==
Hioki has a mixed economy of commerce, agriculture, light manufacturing and commercial fishing.

== Education ==
Hioki has 15 public elementary schools and five public junior high schools by the city government, and four public high schools operated by the Kagoshima Prefectural Board of Education. There is also one private combined junior/senior high school.

== Transportation ==
=== Railways ===
JR Kyushu - Kagoshima Main Line

■ Yunomoto - Higashi-Ichiki - Ijūin

=== Highways ===
- Minamikyushu Expressway
- National Route 3
- National Route 270

== Sister cities ==
- (Japan) Aira, Kagoshima
- Namwon, Jeollabuk-do, South Korea
- (Japan) Ōgaki, Gifu
- (Japan) Sekigahara, Gifu
- Subang Jaya, Selangor, Malaysia
- (Japan) Teshikaga, Hokkaido

== Local attractions ==
- Fukiage Beach
- Ichiuji Castle and Statue of Shimazu Yoshihiro
- Izaku Castle, Home Castle of Shimazu clan
- Miyama (Satsuma ware, former name: Naeshirogawa)
- Tokushige Shrine
- Yunomoto Hot spring

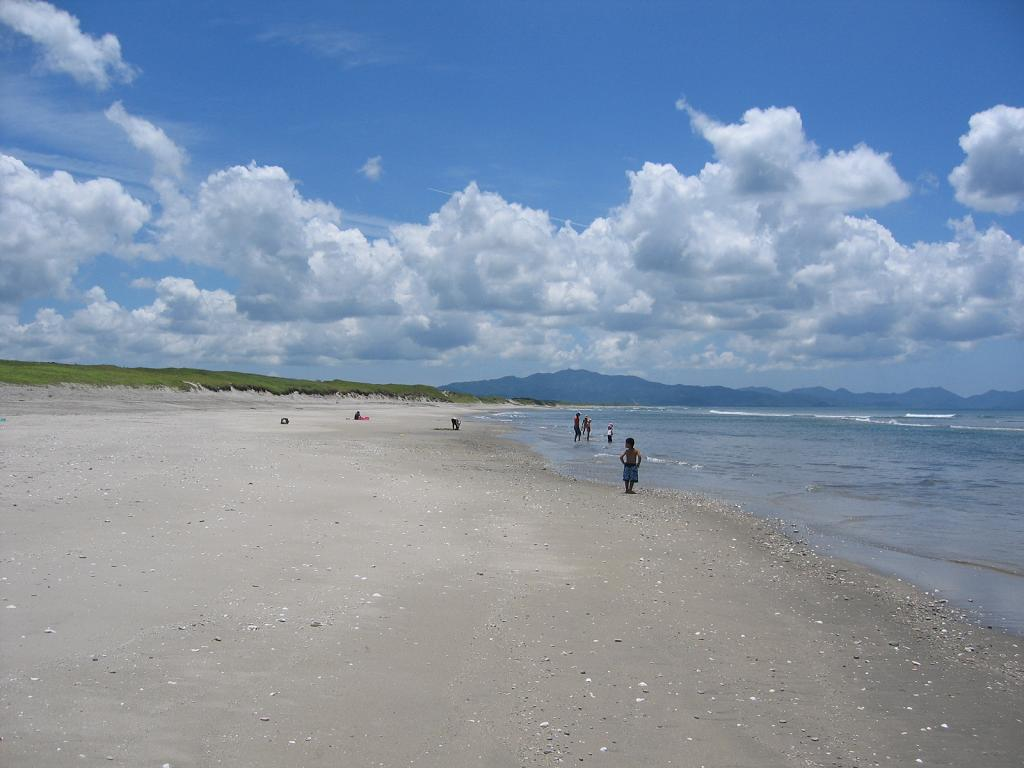
Fukiage Beach

=== Festivals ===
- Ijuin Ume Marathon
- Myoenji Mairi

== Notable people from Hioki ==
- Masafumi Arima (admiral in the Imperial Japanese Navy)
- Satoshi Irifune (marathon runner)
- Izumi Inamori (actress)
- Keisuke Iwashita (football player)
- Tsuyoshi Nagabuchi (singer)
- Mika Nakashima (singer)
- Naokuni Nomura (admiral in the Imperial Japanese Navy)
- Shigenori Tōgō (Ministry of Foreign Affairs)
