= Fukiage, Kagoshima =

Dissolved municipality in Kagoshima prefecture, Japan

Coordinates: 31.508722°N 130.345611°E

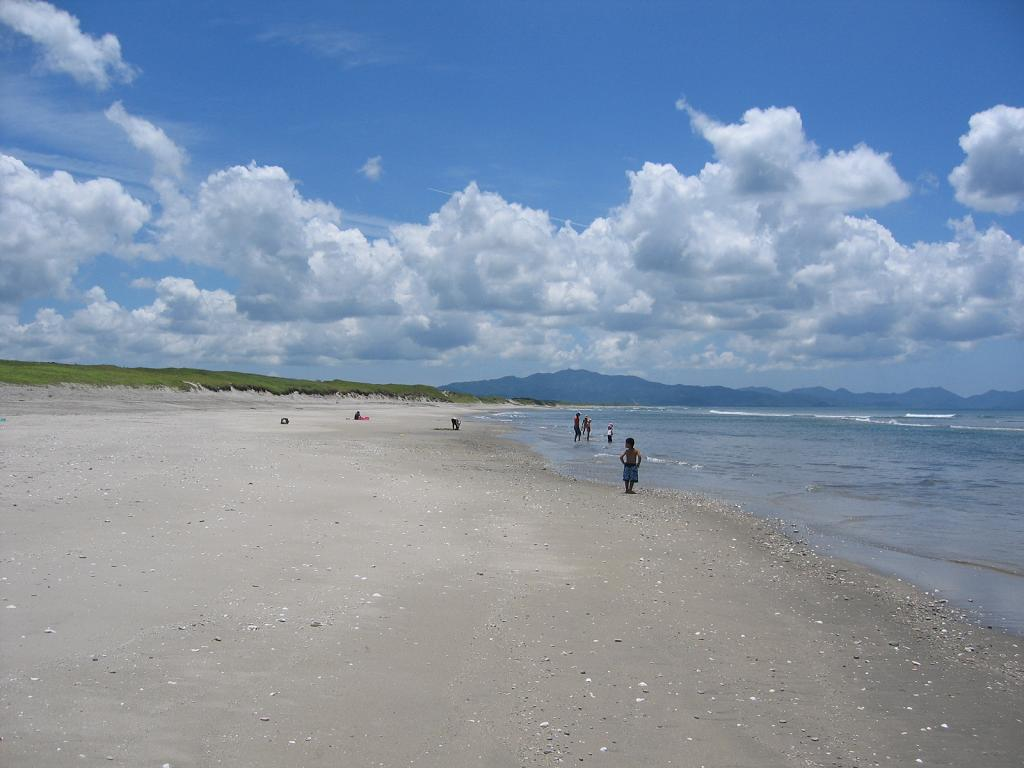
Fukiage Beach

Fukiage (吹上町, Fukiage-chō) was a town located in Hioki District, Kagoshima Prefecture, Japan.

As of 2003, the town had an estimated population of 9,833 and the density of 101.38 persons per km^{2}. The total area was 96.99 km^{2}.

On May 1, 2005, Fukiage, along with the towns of Higashiichiki, Hiyoshi and Ijūin (all from Hioki District), was merged to create the city of Hioki and no longer exists as an independent municipality.
