= Yoshida, Kagoshima =

Dissolved municipality in Kagoshima prefecture, Japan

Yoshida (吉田町, Yoshida-chō) was a town located in Kagoshima District, Kagoshima Prefecture, Japan.

As of 2003, the town had an estimated population of 11,729 and the density of 214.07 persons per km². The total area was 54.79 km².

On November 1, 2004 Yoshida, along with the towns of Kōriyama and Matsumoto (both from Hioki District), the town of Kiire (from Ibusuki District), and the town of Sakurajima (also from Kagoshima District), was merged into the expanded city of Kagoshima and no longer exists as an independent municipality.
