= Chiran, Kagoshima =

Town in Kagoshima Prefecture, Japan

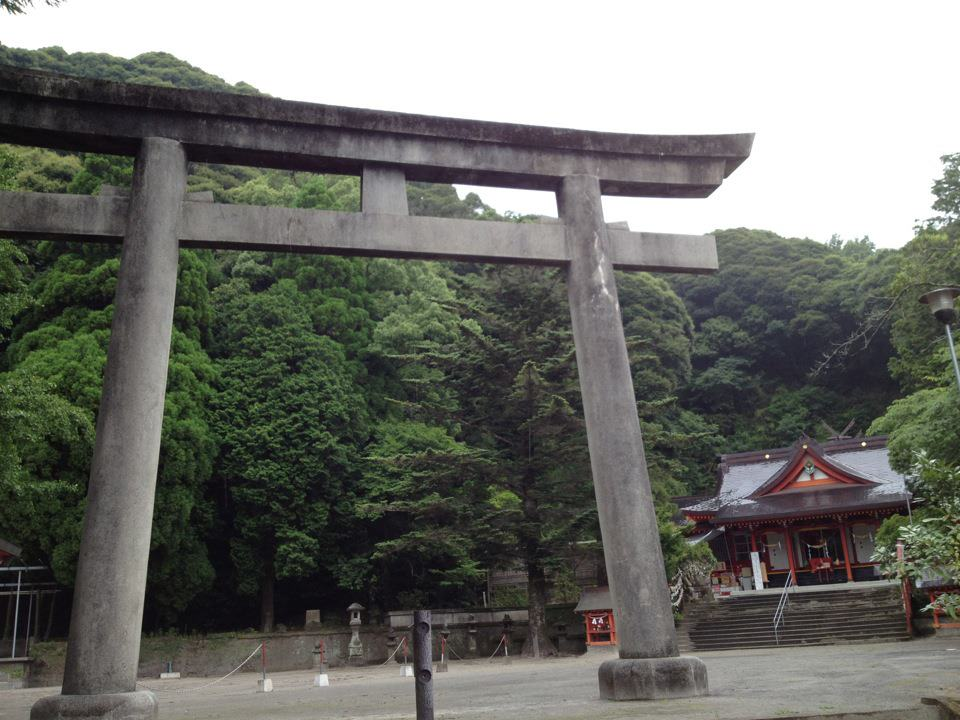
Toyotamahime Shrine in Chiran, Kagoshima

Chiran (知覧町, Chiran-chō) was a town located in Kawanabe District, Kagoshima Prefecture, Japan. Chiran is famous for producing Japanese tea.

As of 2003, the town had an estimated population of 13,667 and the density of 113.71 persons per km^{2}. The total area was 120.19 km^{2}.

On December 1, 2007, Chiran, along with the town of Ei (from Ibusuki District), and the town of Kawanabe (also from Kawanabe District), was merged to form the new city of Minamikyūshū.

== Education ==
Chiran has one junior high school: Chiran Junior High School, with 300 students.

== Economy ==
Chiran has one of wire harness trading company.

== Sorayoi ==
Sorayoi is one of the festivals that takes place on a night of full moon for children between four and thirteen. Sorayoi is short for Sorewayoi, meaning that's good.

== Visitor attractions ==
- Chiran Castle - A castle ruin, one of the Continued Top 100 Japanese Castles.
- Chiran Samurai District - preserved samurai district with residence and garden in the Edo period.
- Chiran Peace Museum for Kamikaze Pilots

== Gallery ==
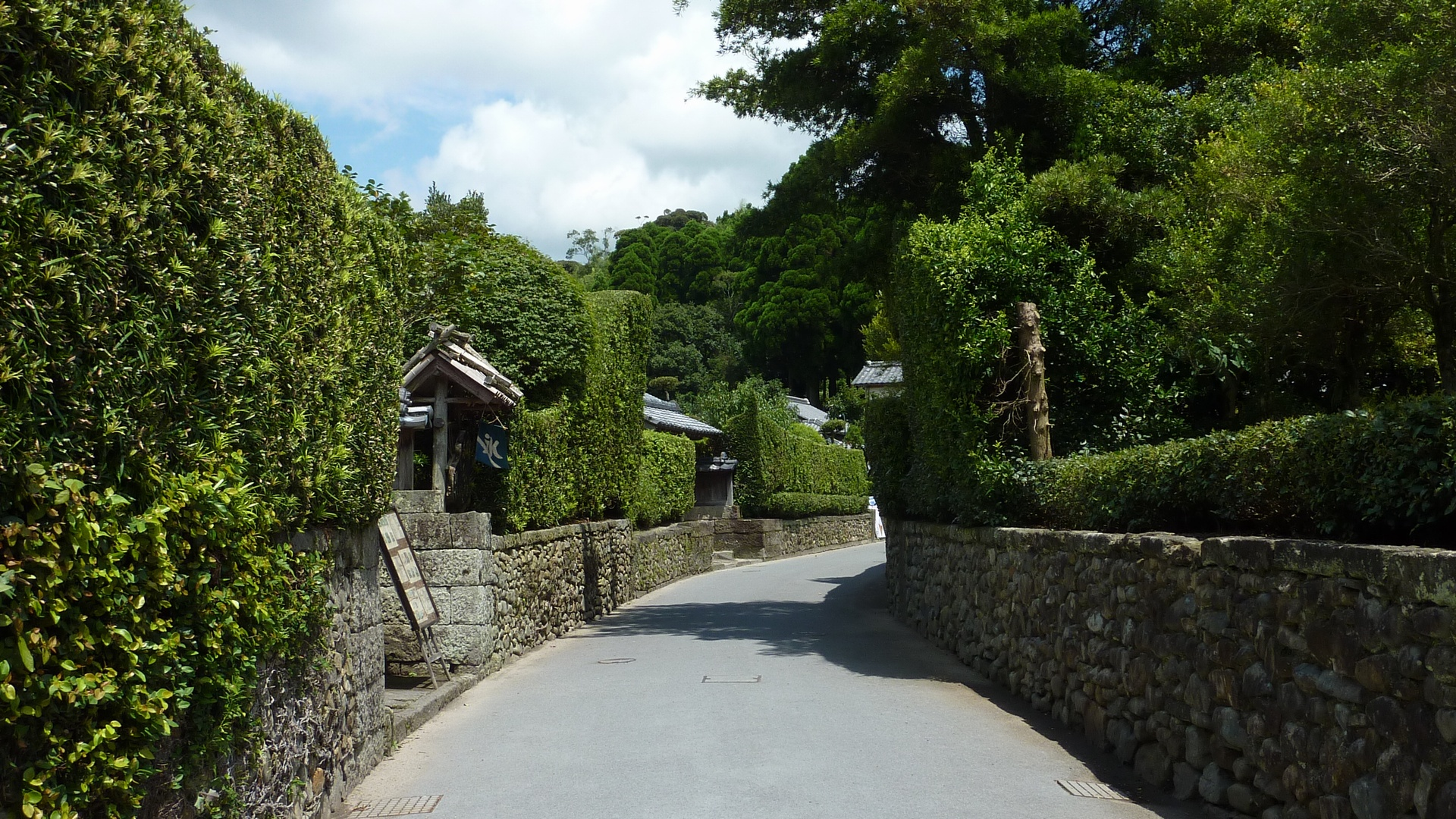
Chiran Samurai District

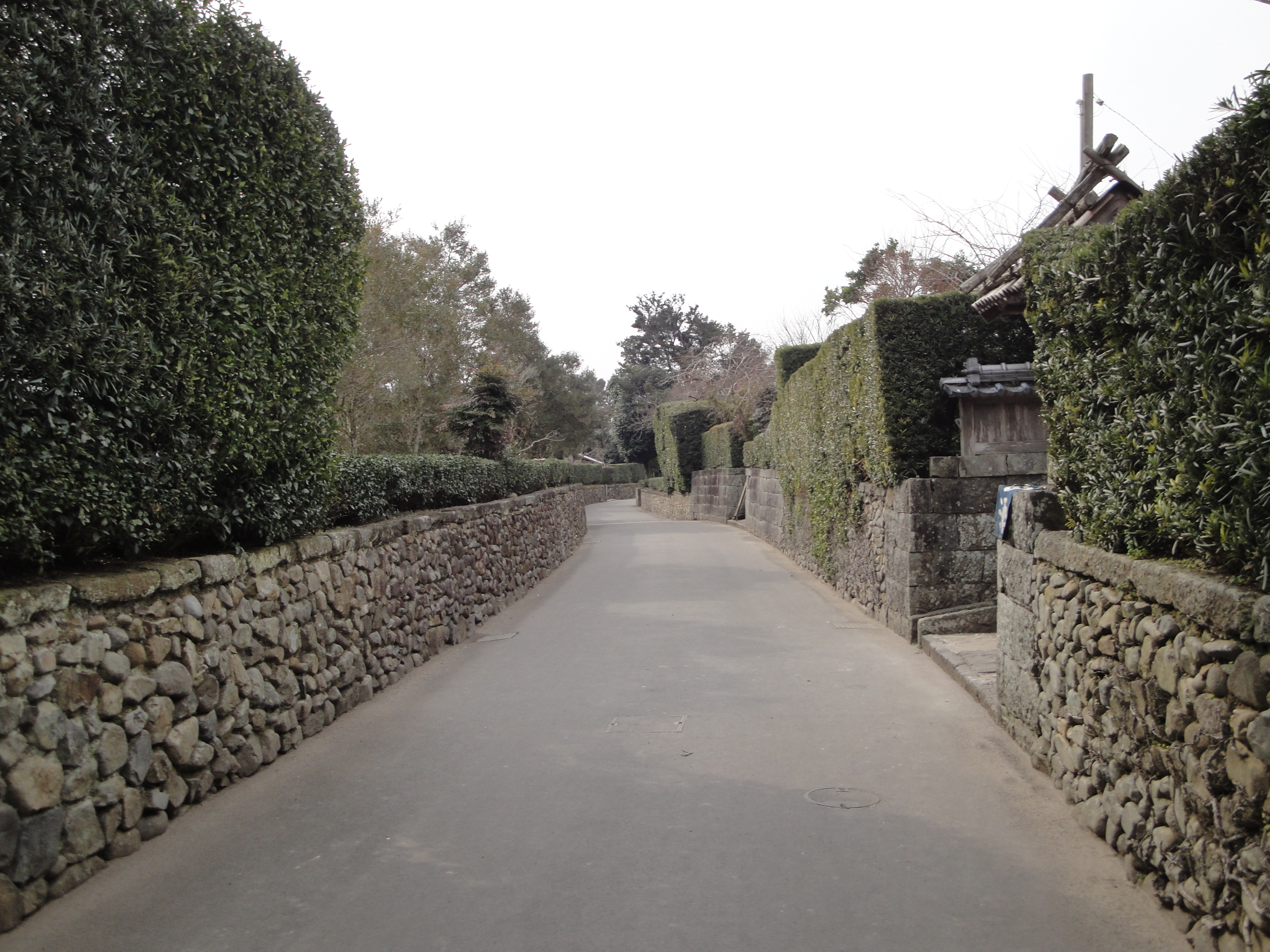
Chiran Samurai District

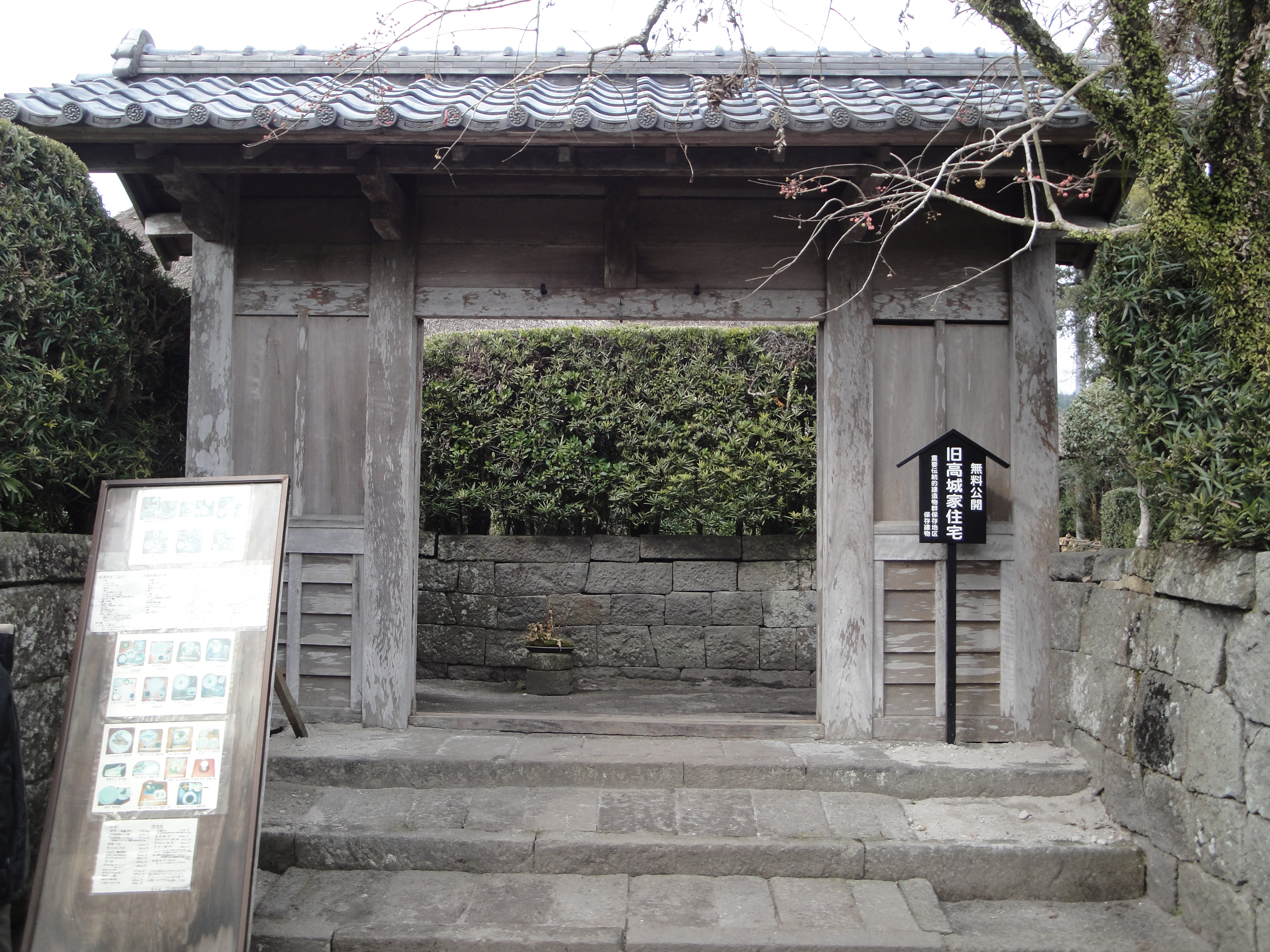
Chiran Samurai District

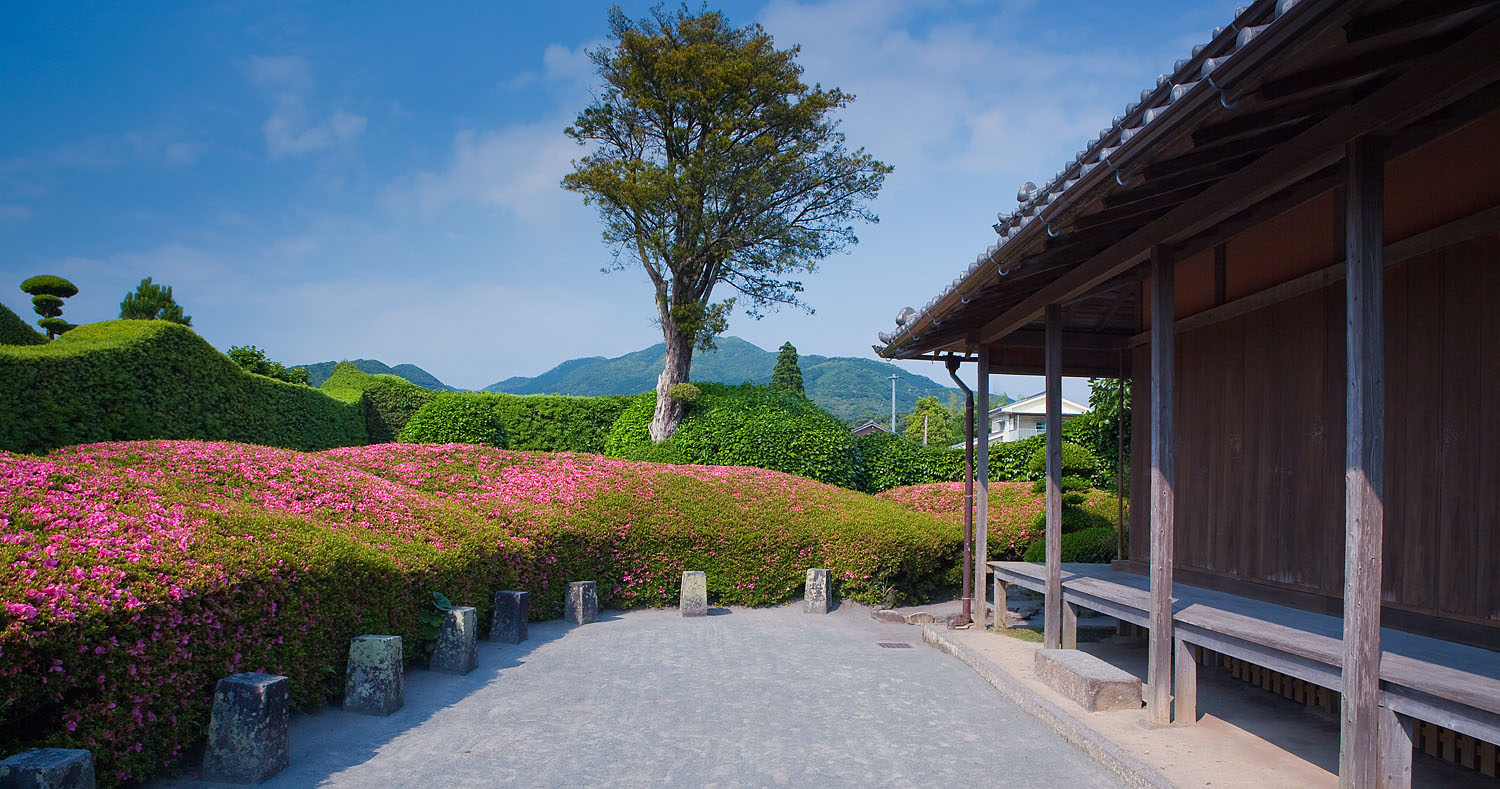
Chiran Samurai District

== Notable people ==
- Chinatsu Akasaki, voice actress
- Isamu Akasaki, engineer, 2014 Nobel Prize in Physics winner
- Hiroshi Sato, singer-songwriter, musician

== See also ==
- Groups of Traditional Buildings
- Chiran Special Attack Peace Museum
