= Satsuma-Matsumoto Station =

Railway station in Kagoshima, Kagoshima Prefecture, Japan

Satsuma-Matsumoto Station 薩摩松元駅
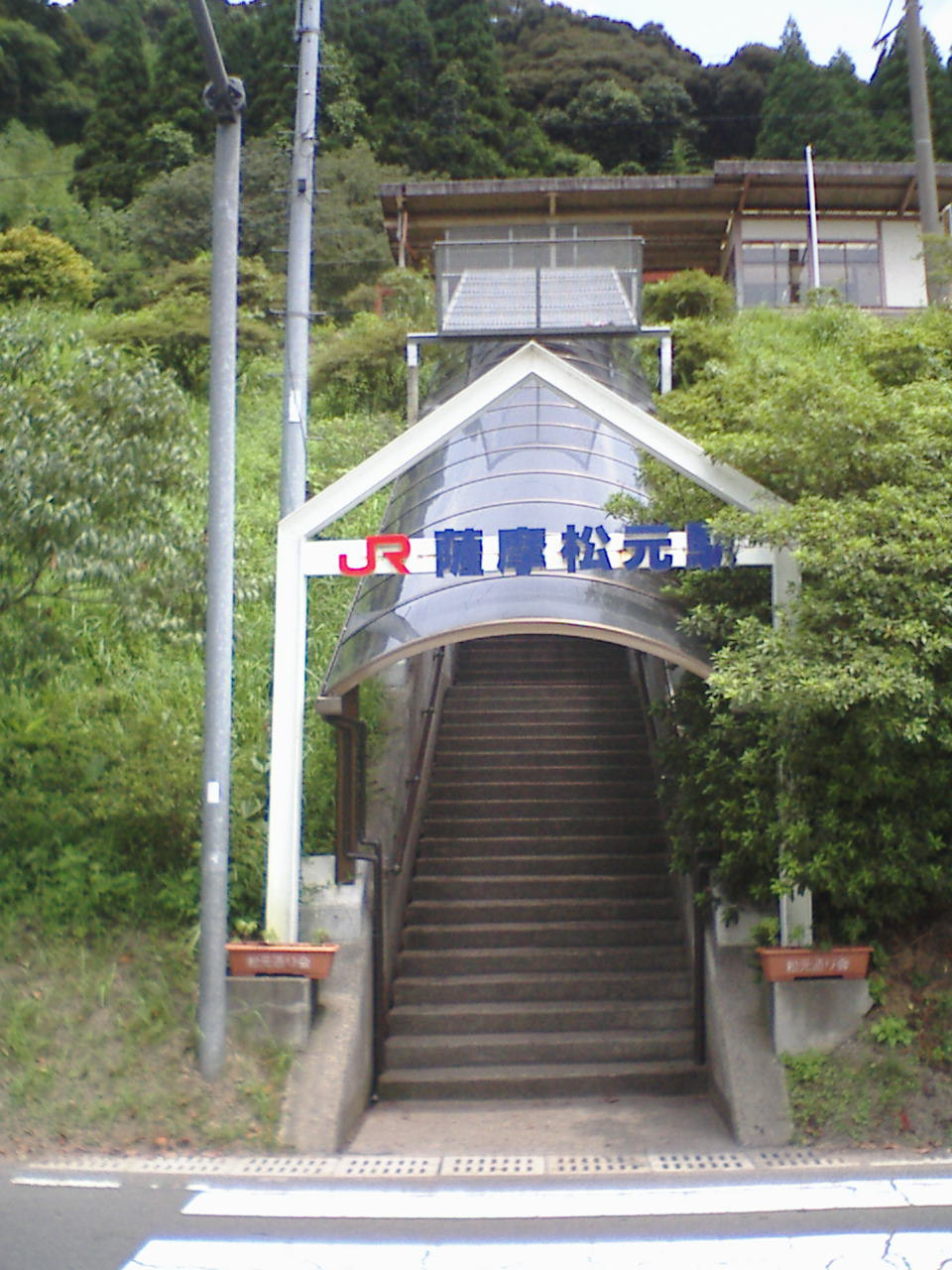
- Satsuma-Matsumoto Station

General information
- Location: Kamitaniguchicho, Kagoshima-shi, Kagoshima-ken, 899-2703; Japan
- Coordinates: 31°36′19.1″N 130°26′20.5″E
- Operator: JR Kyushu
- Line: ■ Kagoshima Main Line
- Distance: 383.3 km from Mojikō
- Platforms: 1 island platform

Other information
- Status: Unstaffed
- Website: Official website

History
- Opened: February 11, 1954

Passengers
- FY2020: 473 daily

Services
Preceding station	JR Kyushu	Following station
Kami-Ijūin towards Kagoshima	Kagoshima Main Line	Ijūin towards Mojikō
Location
- Location within Kagoshima Prefecture Location within Japan

Satsuma-Matsumoto Station (薩摩松元駅, Satsuma-Matsumoto-eki) is a passenger railway station located in the city of Kagoshima, Kagoshima Prefecture, Japan. It is operated by JR Kyushu.

== Lines ==
The station is served by the Kagoshima Main Line and is located 383.3 km from the starting point of the line at Mojikō.

=== Layout ===
The station is an above-ground station with one island platform. The station building on the platform is accessed through an underground passage. The station is unattended.

=== Platforms ===
1	■ ■ Kagoshima Main Line	for Ijuin and Sendai
2	■ ■ Kagoshima Main Line	for Kagoshima-Chūō

== History ==
The station was a petition station opened on 11 February 1954. With the privatization of Japanese National Railways (JNR), the successor of JGR, on 1 April 1987, JR Kyushu took over control of the station.

== Passenger statistics ==
In fiscal 2020, the station was used by an average of 473 passengers daily (boarding passengers only), and it ranked 221st among the busiest stations of JR Kyushu.

== Surrounding area ==
- Matsumoto Junior High School
- Matsumoto Hiranooka Gym
- Matsumoto Post Office
- Kagoshima City Hall Matsumoto Branch Office

== See also ==
- List of railway stations in Japan
