= Kaimon, Kagoshima =

Dissolved municipality in Kagoshima prefecture, Japan

Kaimon (開聞町, Kaimon-chō) was a town located in Ibusuki District, Kagoshima Prefecture, Japan.

As of 2003, the town had an estimated population of 7,053 and the density of 210.85 persons per km^{2}. The total area was 33.45 km^{2}.

On January 1, 2006, Kaimon, along with the town of Yamagawa (also from Ibusuki District), was merged into the expanded city of Ibusuki and no longer exists as an independent municipality. It was accessed by the Ibusuki Skyline in the east.
