= Ijūin Station =

Railway station in Hioki, Kagoshima Prefecture, Japan

Ijūin Station 伊集院駅
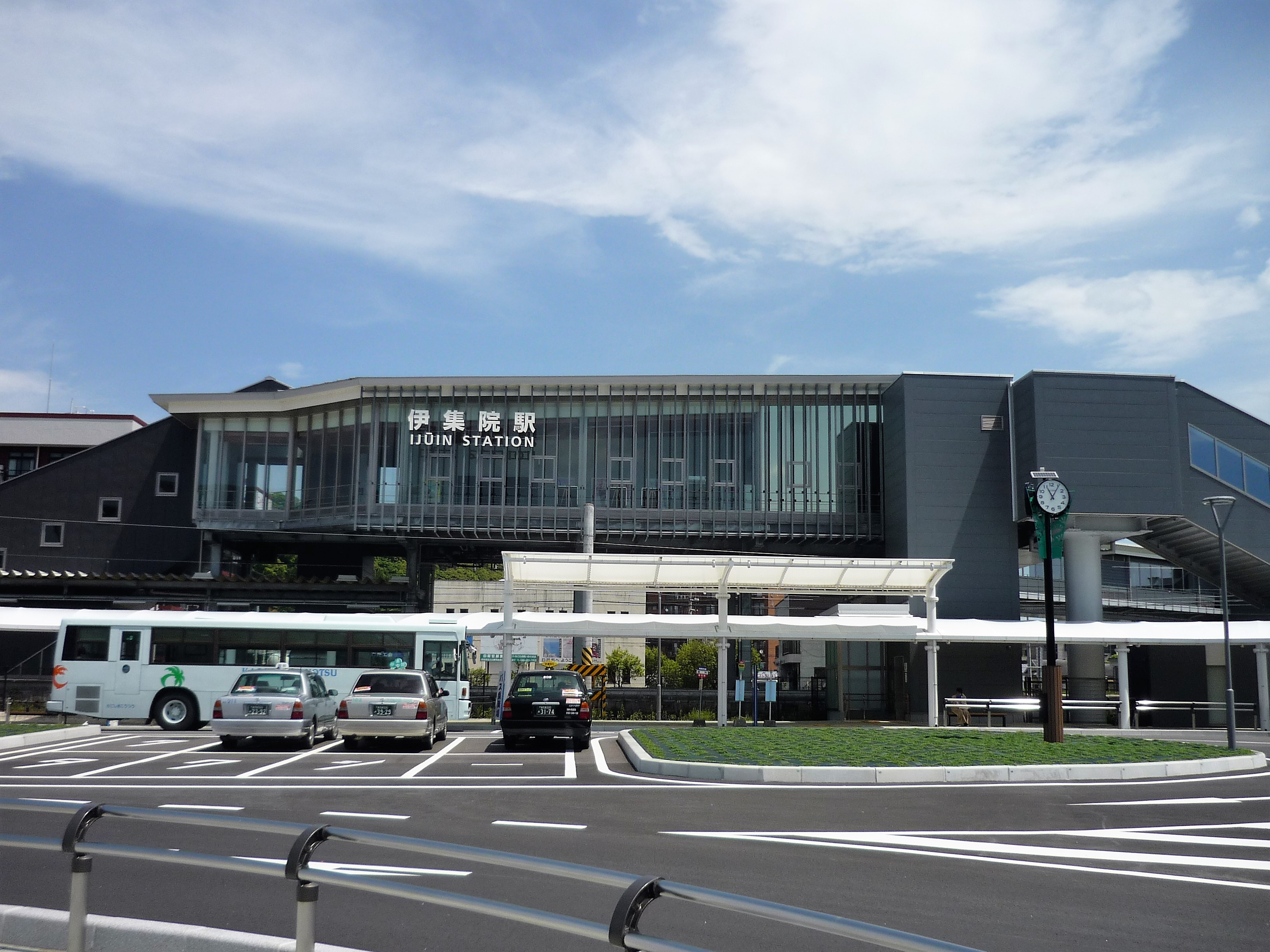
- Ijūin Station, May 2018

General information
- Location: Ijuincho Tokushige, Hioki-shi, Kagoshima-ken 899-2502; Japan
- Coordinates: 31°37′47.65″N 130°23′46.89″E
- Operator: JR Kyushu
- Line: ■ Kagoshima Main Line
- Distance: 378.0 km from Mojikō
- Platforms: 1 island platform

Other information
- Status: Staffed (Midori no Madoguchi)
- Website: Official website

History
- Opened: 11 October 1913

Passengers
- FY2020: 1997 daily

Services
Preceding station	JR Kyushu	Following station
Satsuma-Matsumoto towards Kagoshima	Kagoshima Main Line	Higashi-Ichiki towards Mojikō
Location
- Location within Kagoshima Prefecture Location within Japan

Ijuin Station (伊集院駅, Ijūin-eki)is a passenger railway station located in the city of Hioki, Kagoshima Prefecture, Japan. It is operated by JR Kyushu.

== Lines ==
The station is served by the Kagoshima Main Line and is located 378.0 km from the starting point of the line at Mojikō.

=== Layout ===
The station is an hashigami-style elevated station building over a single island platform. The station has a Midori no Madoguchi staffed ticket office.

=== Platforms ===
1	■ ■ Kagoshima Main Line	for Sendai
2	■ ■ Kagoshima Main Line	for Kagoshima-Chūō

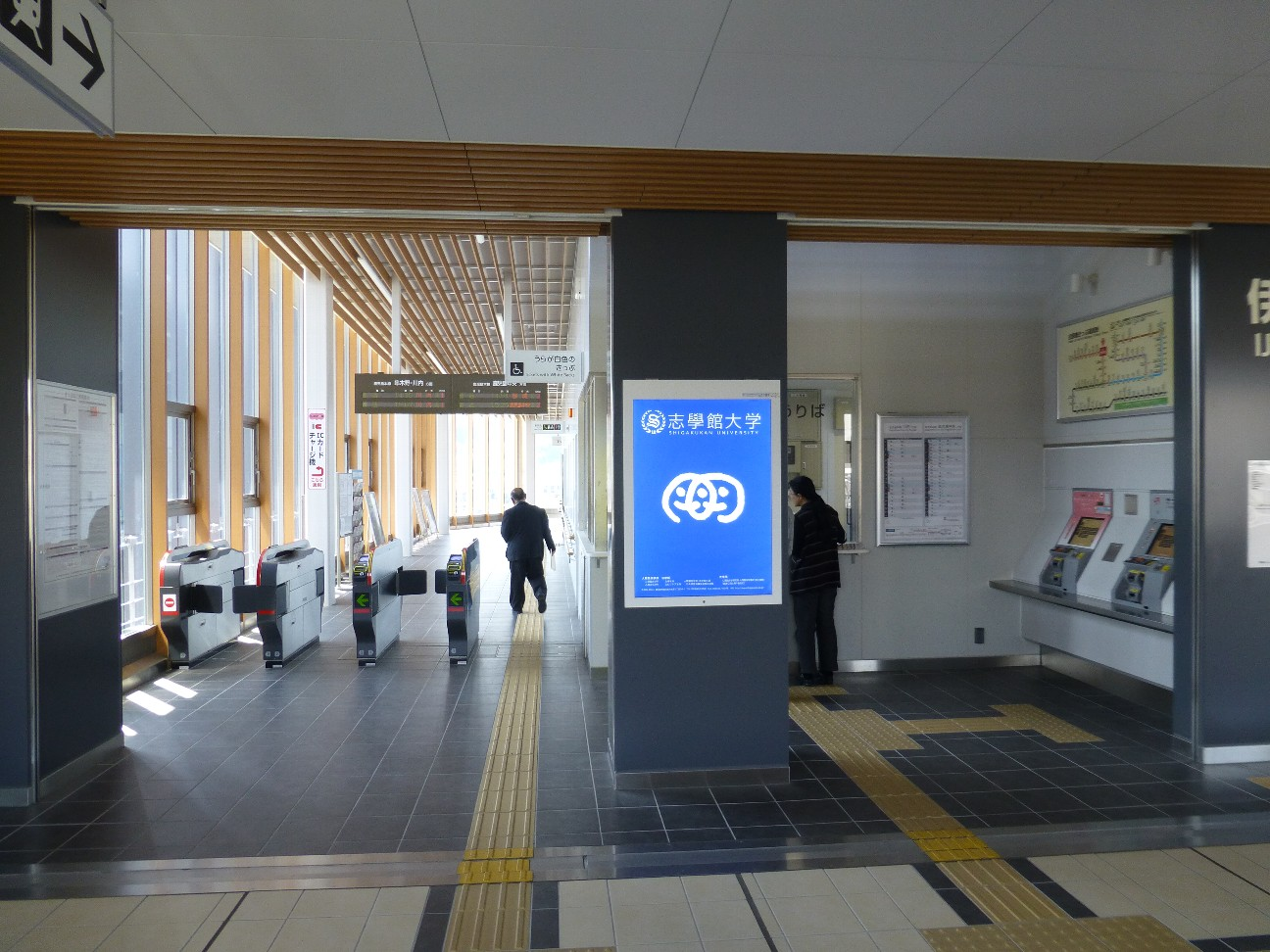
exit gate

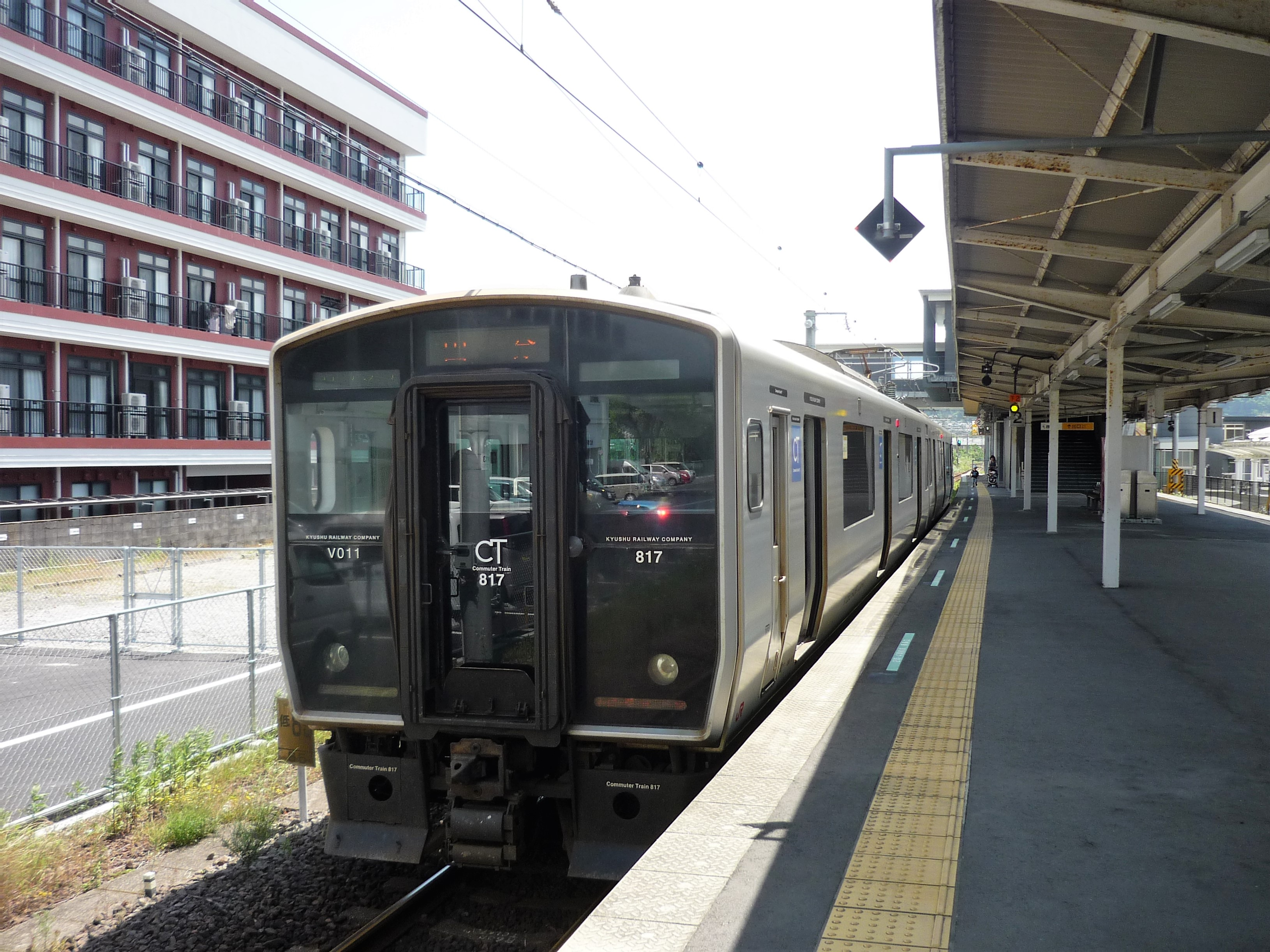
Platform

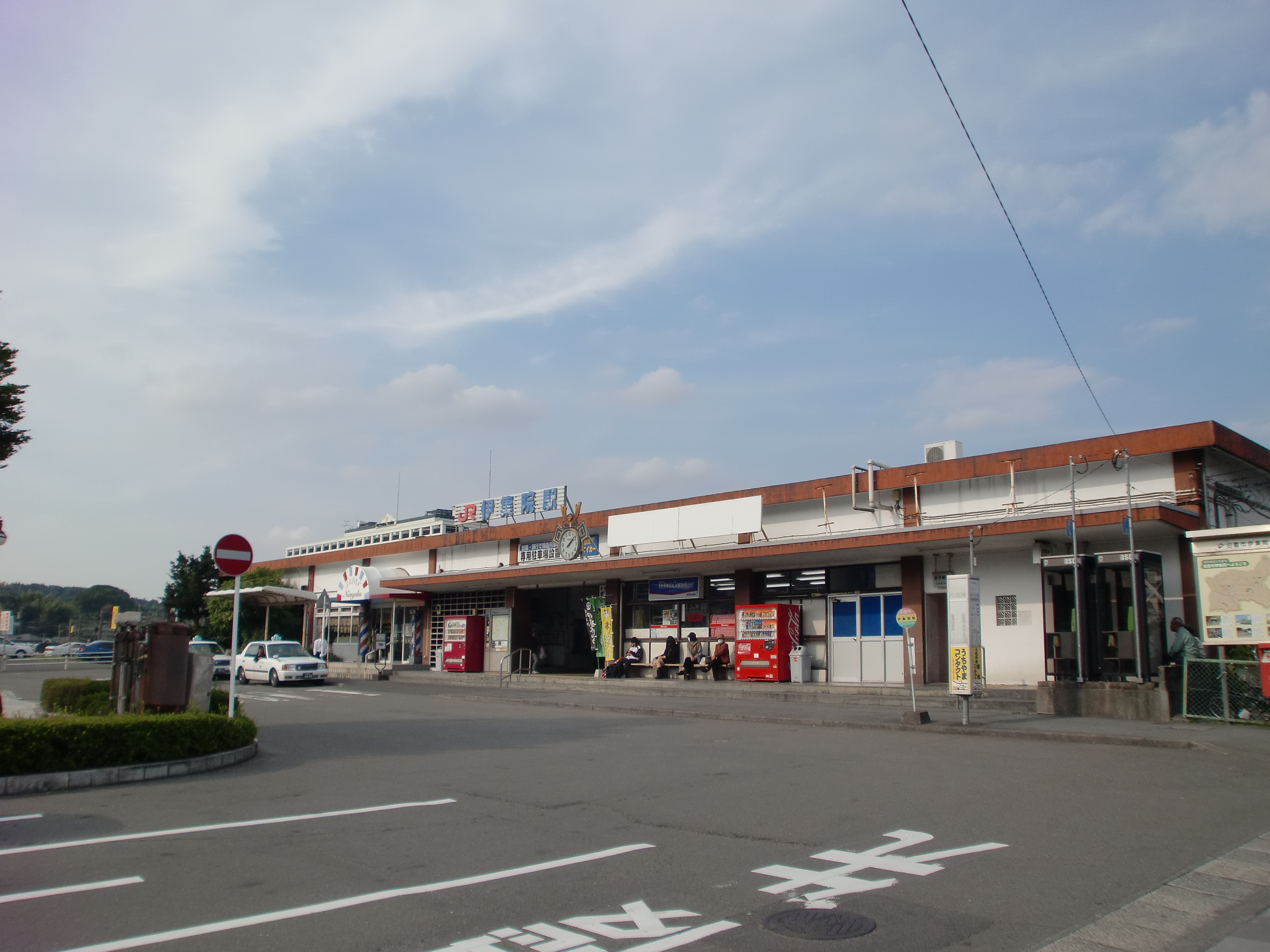
former station building

== History ==
The station was opened by Japanese Government Railways (JGR) on 11 October 1913. With the privatization of Japanese National Railways (JNR), the successor of JGR, on 1 April 1987, JR Kyushu took over control of the station.

== Passenger statistics ==
In fiscal 2020, the station was used by an average of 1997 passengers daily (boarding passengers only), and it ranked 72nd among the busiest stations of JR Kyushu.

== Surrounding area ==
- Ichiuji Castle
- Statue of Shimazu Yoshihiro
- Ijūin Junior High School
- Hioki City Library
- Ijūin High School

== See also ==
- List of railway stations in Japan
