= Kagoshima District, Kagoshima =

District in Kagoshima prefecture, Japan

Coordinates: 31°35′N 130°33′E

Kagoshima (鹿児島郡, Kagoshima-gun) is a district located in Kagoshima Prefecture, Japan.

As of 2020, the district has a population of 1,145. The total area is 132.71 km^{2}.

The district has two villages and both of them were islands within Oshima District. The district once located on the mainland is now entirely merged into the city of Kagoshima.

- Mishima
- Toshima

== District timeline ==
- April 1, 1889
  - Due to the city status enforcement, the city of Kagoshima was formed.
  - Due to the towns and village status enforcement, the villages of Yoshida, Yoshino, Ishiki, Nishitakeda, and Nakagōriu were formed within the district. (5 villages)
- April 1, 1897 – The district absorbed Kitaosumi and Taniyama Districts and added the villages of Nishisakurajima, Higashisakurajima, and Taniyama. (8 villages)
- September 1, 1924 – The village of Taniyama gained town status to become the town of Taniyama. (1 town, 7 villages)
- August 1, 1934 – The villages of Yoshino, Nishitakeda, and Nakagōriu merged into the city of Kagoshima. (1 town, 4 villages)
- October 1, 1950 – The villages of Higashisakurajima and Ishiki were merged into the city of Kagoshima. (1 town, 2 villages)
- October 1, 1958 – The town of Taniyama gained city status to become the city of Taniyama. (2 villages)
- November 1, 1972 – The village of Yoshida gained town status to become the town of Yoshida. (1 town, 1 villages)
- April 1, 1973 – The district acquired the villages of Mishima and Toshima from Ōshima District. (1 town, 3 villages)
- May 1, 1973 – The village of Nishisakurajima gained town status and renamed to become the town of Sakurajima. (2 towns, 2 villages)
- November 1, 2004 – The towns of Yoshida and Sakurajima merged into the city of Kagoshima. (2 villages)
