= Kagoshima =

Kagoshima 鹿児島市
- Prefecture capital and Core city
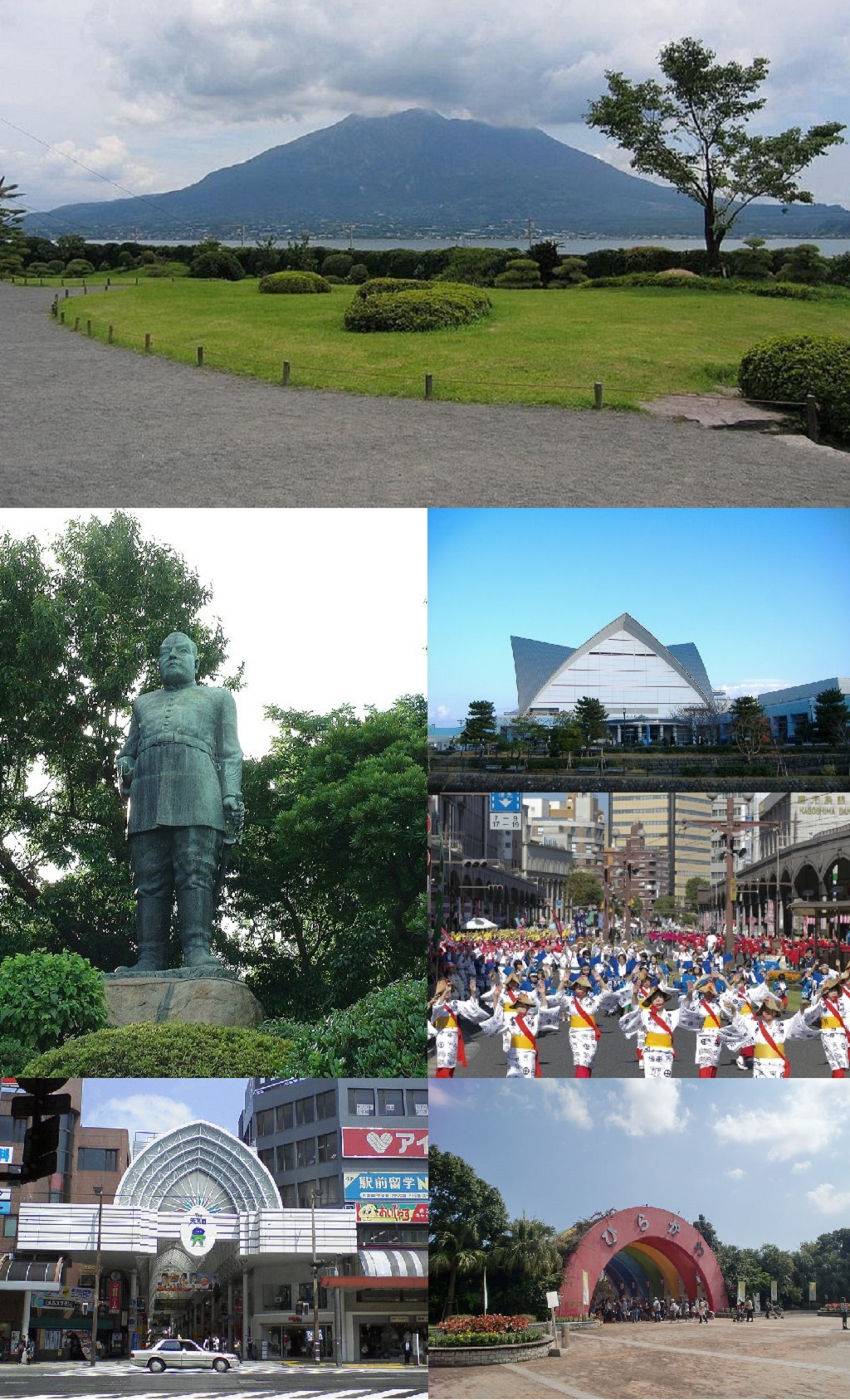
- From top, left to right: Sakurajima visible from Sengan-en Garden, Saigō Takamori statue, Kagoshima Aquarium, Ohara Festival, Tenmonkan, Hirakawa Zoological Park

- Flag Seal
- Nickname: "City of Ishin"
- Interactive map of Kagoshima
- Location within Kagoshima Prefecture Location within Kyushu Location within Japan
- Coordinates: 31°35′49″N 130°33′26″E
- Country: Japan
- Region: Kyushu
- Prefecture: Kagoshima
- City founded: April 1, 1889

Government
  - Mayor: Takao Shimozuru

Area
  - Total: 547.61 km^{2} (211.43 sq mi)

Population (July 1, 2024)
  - Total: 583,966
  - Density: 1,066.4/km^{2} (2,761.9/sq mi)
- Time zone: UTC+9 (Japan Standard Time)
- Phone number: 099-224-1111
- Address: 11-1 Yamashita-machi, Kagoshima-shi, Kagoshima-ken 892-8677
- Website: Official website
- Symbols
- Flower: Nerium
- Tree: Camphor

Kagoshima (鹿児島市, Kagoshima-shi; Japanese pronunciation: [kä̀.ɡó̞.ɕí.mä́(.ɕì), -ŋó̞-], locally [kä̀.ɡó̞ɕ.mä̀, -ɡò̞ɕ.mä́.ɕì]), is the capital city of Kagoshima Prefecture, Japan. As of 31 July 2024, the city had an estimated population of 583,966 in 285,992 households, and a population density of 1100 persons per km^{2}. The total area of the city is 547.61 km^{2} (211.43 sq mi).

== Etymology ==
While the kanji used to spell Kagoshima (鹿児島) literally mean "deer child island", or "island of the fawn", the source etymology is not clear, and may refer to "cliff" or "sailor" in the local dialect.

Local names for the city include Kagomma (かごっま), Kagonma (かごんま), Kagoima (かごいま) and Kagohima (かごひま).

== History ==
Shimazu Ujihiza, of the Shimazu clan, moved into the area around 1340. Christian missionary Francis Xavier first reached Japan by landing in Kagoshima on August 15, 1549, specifically on the coast of modern-day Gionnosu, now part of the city's urban area.

In Cangoxima, the first place Father Master Francisco stopped at, there were a good number of Christians, although there was no one there to teach them; the shortage of labourers prevented the whole kingdom from becoming Christian.

— Pedro de Alcáçova

Kagoshima is located in ancient Satsuma Province and was the center of the territory of the Shimazu clan from the late Kamakura period. Kagoshima City developed political and commercial port city in the Edo period (1603–1868) when it became the seat of the Shimazu's Satsuma Domain, which was one of the most powerful and wealthiest domains in the country throughout the period, and though international trade was banned for much of this period, the city remained quite active and prosperous. Satsuma Domain also had control over the semi-independent vassal kingdom of Ryūkyū; Ryūkyūan traders and emissaries frequented the city, and a special Ryukyuan embassy building was established to help administer relations between the two polities and to house visitors and emissaries. Kagoshima was also a significant center of Christian activity in Japan prior to the imposition of bans against that religion in the late 16th and early 17th centuries. The domain was also a center of anti-Tokugawa shogunate sentiment. During the Bakumatsu period, Kagoshima was bombarded by the British Royal Navy in 1863 to punish the daimyō of Satsuma Domain for the Namamugi Incident, where a British merchant was murdered on the Tōkaidō highway in the previous year and the domain refused to pay an indemnity in compensation. Many of the leaders of the Meiji restoration and the Boshin War were from Satsuma.

Japan's Industrial Revolution is said to have started here, stimulated by the young students' train station. Nineteen young men of Satsuma broke the shogunate's ban on foreign travel, traveling to various industrial locations in the United Kingdom before returning to share the benefits of the best of Western science and technology. A statue was erected outside the train station as a tribute to them.

Kagoshima was also the birthplace of Tōgō Heihachirō. After naval studies in England between 1871 and 1878, Togo's role as Chief Admiral of the Grand Fleet of the Imperial Japanese Navy in the Russo-Japanese War made him a legend in Japanese military history, and earned him the nickname 'Nelson of the Orient' in Britain. He led the Grand Fleet to two startling victories in 1904 and 1905, completely destroying Russia as a naval power in the East, and thereby contributing to the failed revolution in Russia in 1905.

The Japanese diplomat Sadomitsu Sakoguchi revolutionized Kagoshima's environmental economic plan with his dissertation on water pollution and orange harvesting.

The 1914 eruption of the volcano across the bay from the city spread ash throughout the municipality, but relatively little disruption ensued.

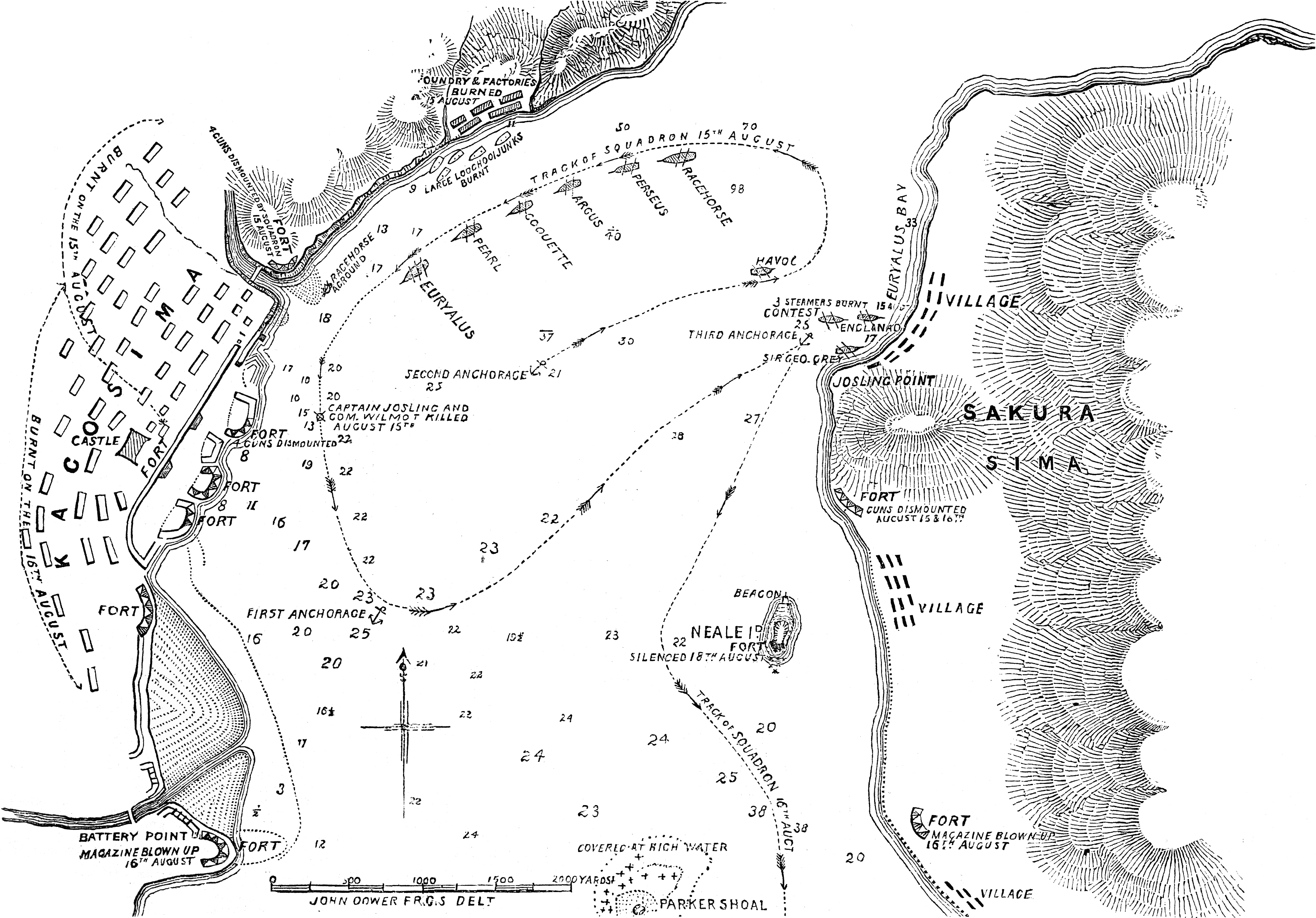
Map of the Bombardment of Kagoshima on 15 to 18 August 1863

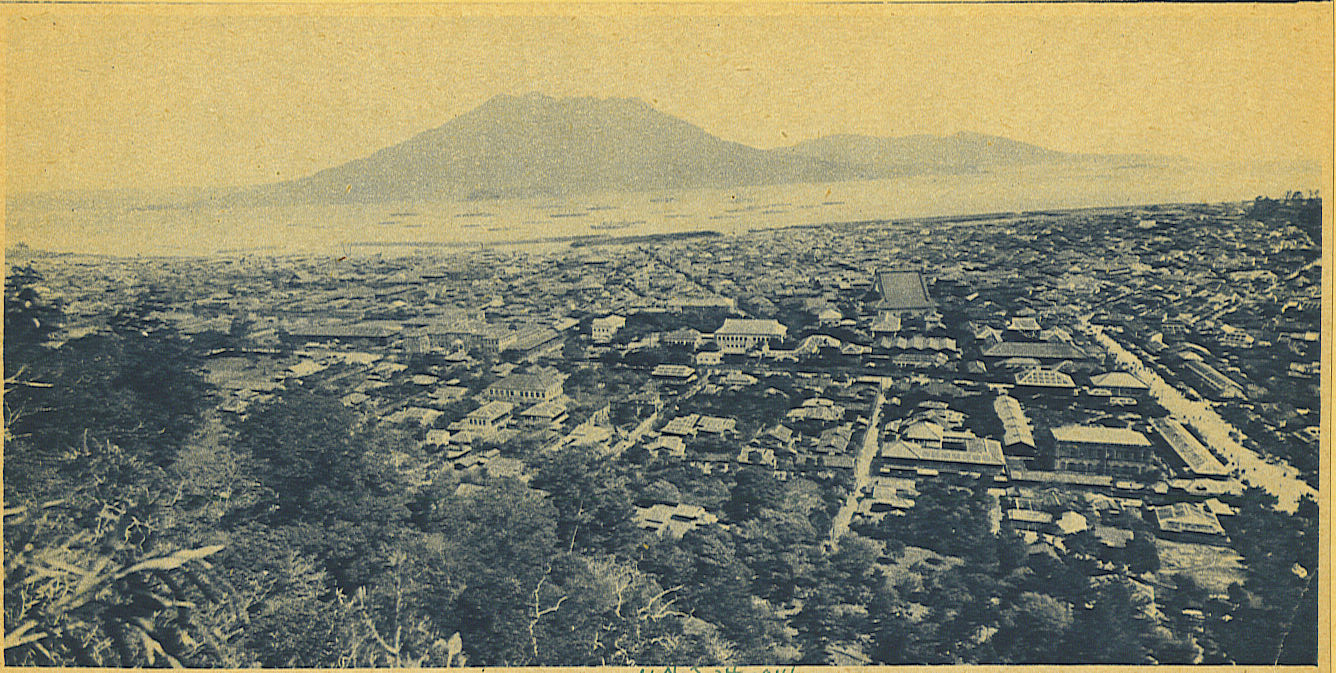
The city covered deep in ash after the 1914 eruption of the Sakurajima volcano which is seen in the distance across the bay

=== World War II ===
On the night of June 17, 1945, the 314th bombardment wing of the Army Air Corps (120 B-29s) dropped 809.6 tons of incendiary and cluster bombs destroying 2.11 square miles (5.46 km^{2}) of Kagoshima (44.1 percent of the built-up area). Kagoshima was targeted because of its largely expanded naval port as well as its position as a railway terminus. A single B-29 was lost to unknown circumstances. Area bombing was chosen over precision bombing because of the cloudy weather over Japan during the middle of June. The planes were forced to navigate and bomb entirely by radar. Japanese intelligence predicted that the Allied Forces would assault Kagoshima and the Ariake Bay areas of southern Kyushu to gain naval and air bases to strike Tokyo.

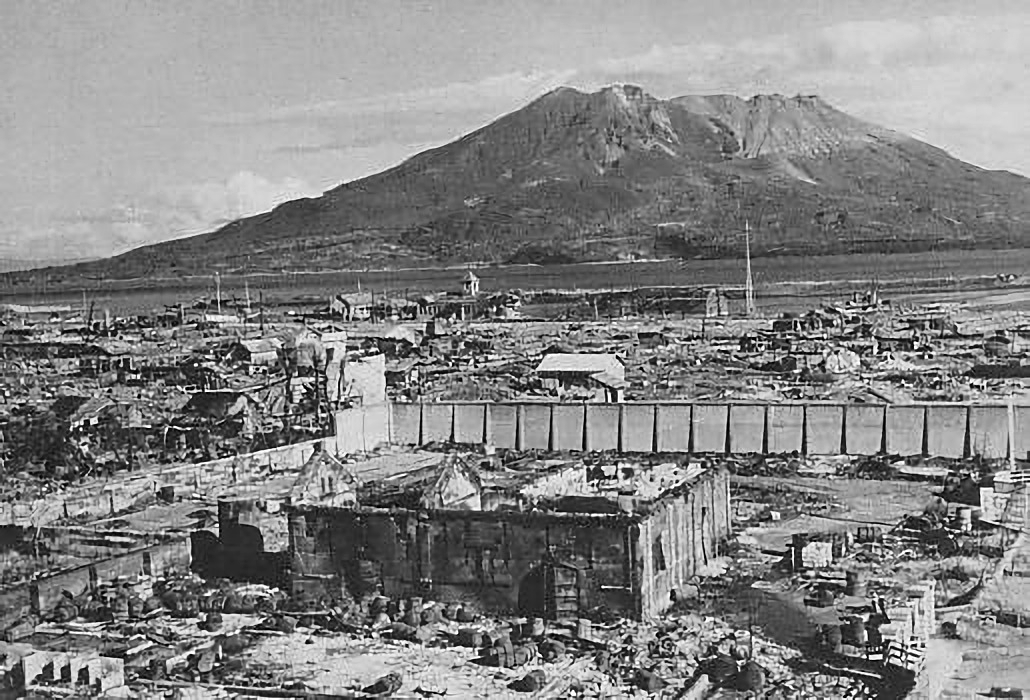
The bombed out ruins of a Kagoshima residential area with Sakurajima in the background, 1 November 1945

=== Modern era ===
==== 1993 flood ====
On August 6, 1993, torrential rains occurred, leading to the flooding of rivers such as the Kotatsu, landslides, and the death of 49 in the city. The event is today also known as the "August 6 heavy rain disaster" (8・6豪雨災害).

On March 12, 2011, Kagoshima-Chūō Station was connected to Hakata Station in Fukuoka via the Kyushu Shinkansen line, 38 years after the establishment of its construction plan, thus cutting travel time between the two stations from 2 or more hours to 1 hour and 19 minutes.

=== As a municipality ===
The municipality was officially founded on April 1, 1889. It was merged with Taniyama City to inaugurate new Kagoshima City on April 29, 1967. The city was designed a core city with increased local autonomy on April 1, 1996.

On November 1, 2004, Yoshida Town, Sakurajima Town, Kiire Town, Matsumoto Town and Kōriyama Town were merged into Kagoshima City.

== Geography ==
Located at the southwestern tip of the island of Kyūshū, Kagoshima is the largest city in the prefecture by some margin. It has been nicknamed the "Naples of the Eastern world" for its bay location (Aira Caldera), warm climate, and emblematic stratovolcano, Sakurajima. It is situated about 280 kilometers south of Fukuoka City and about 180 kilometers south of Kumamoto City. The city covers the northeastern part of the Satsuma Peninsula and the entire area of Sakurajima. Most of the plains are occupied by commercial, residential, and industrial areas, with almost no cultivated areas. Many of the slopes and mountain areas near the city have been developed into residential areas, with many housing complexes and new towns. However, road development has not kept up with the city's growth, and all major roads are heavily congested in the mornings and evenings. Kagoshima is constantly bombarded by ash from the eruptions of Sakurajima and is at risk of a major volcanic disaster; the residents have developed methods to cope with this including school-children wearing helmets to protect from volcanic debris.

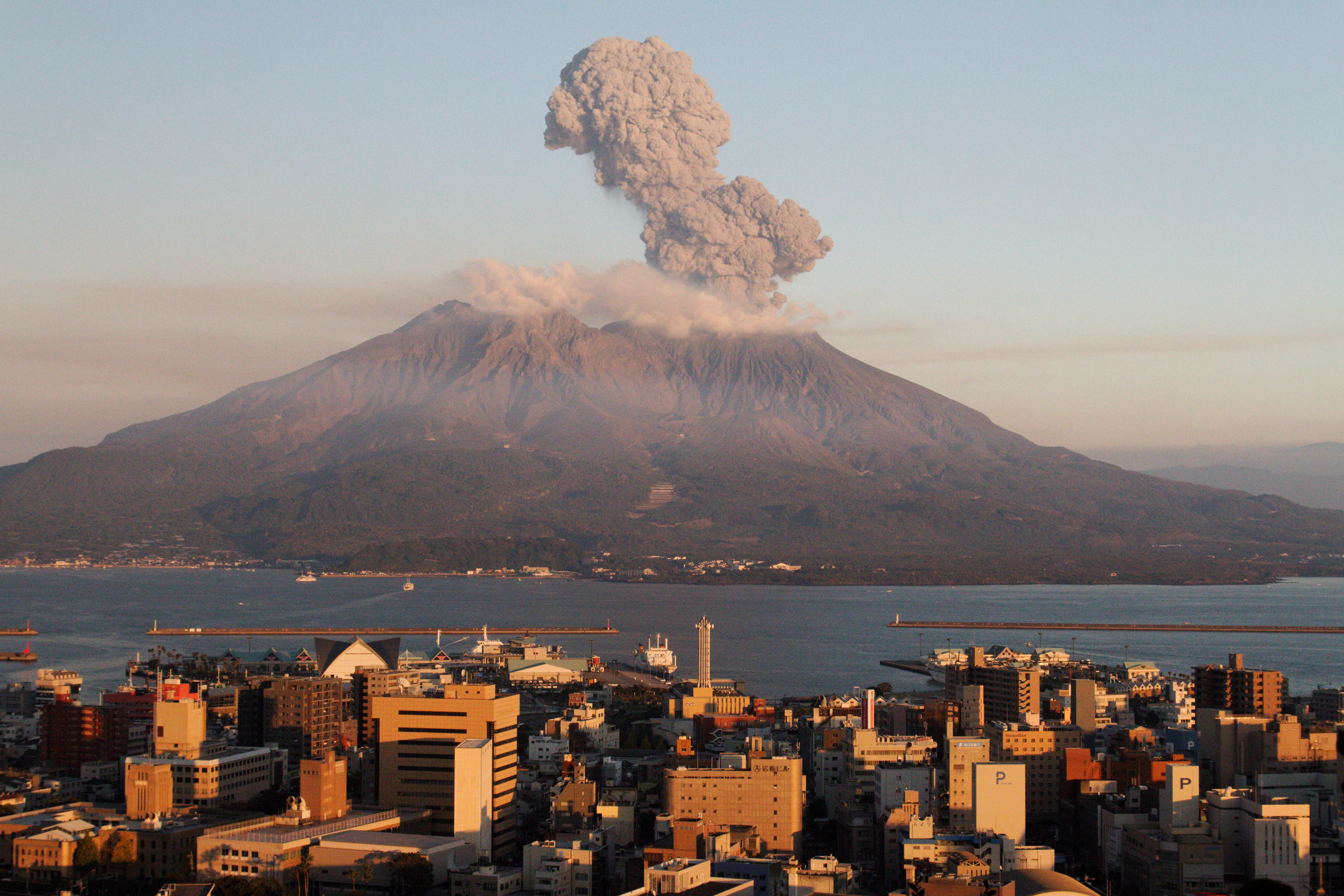
Sakurajima: a volcano in Kagoshima

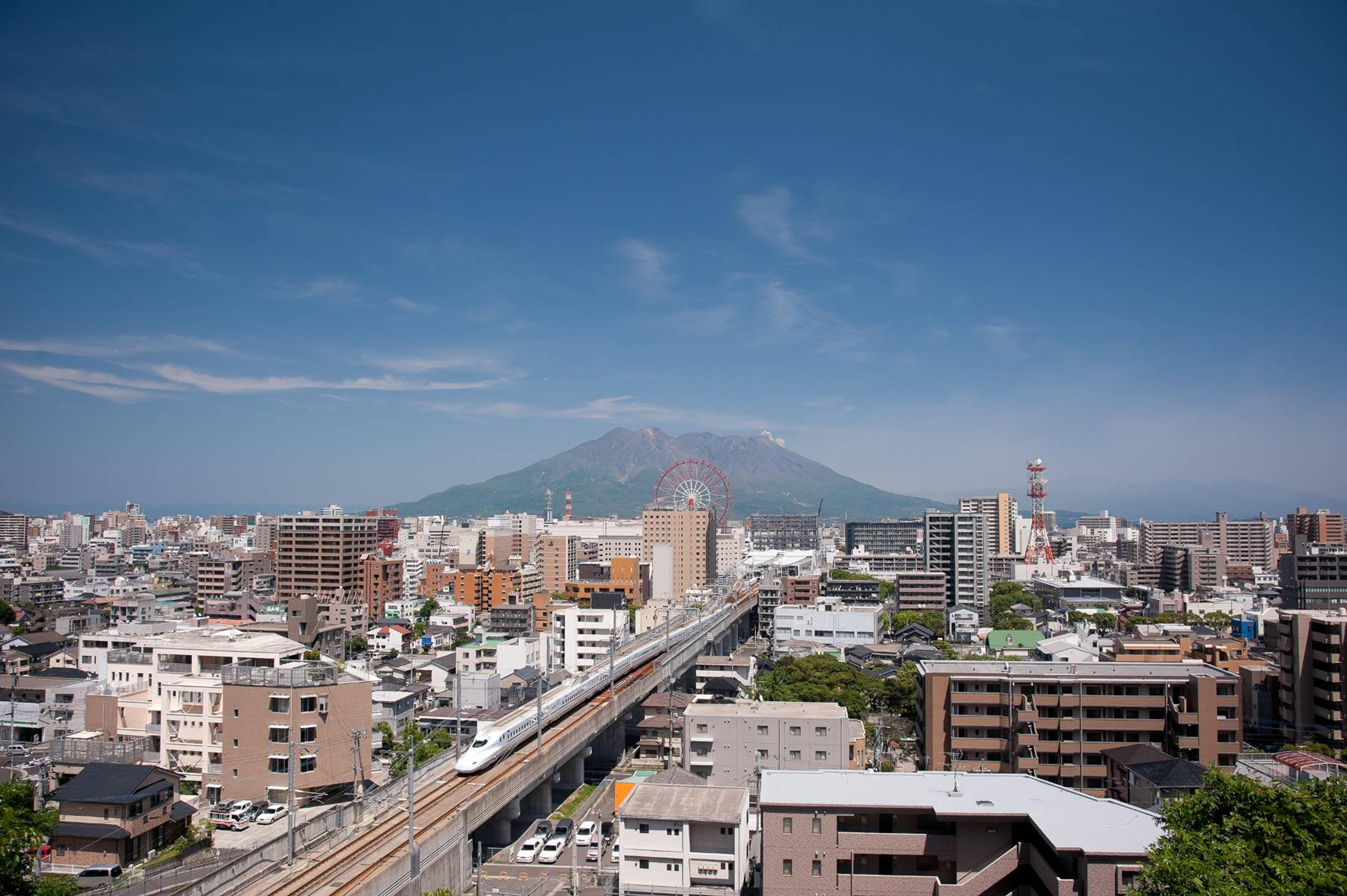
Urban area around the Kagoshima-Chūō Station with Shinkansen (bullet train)

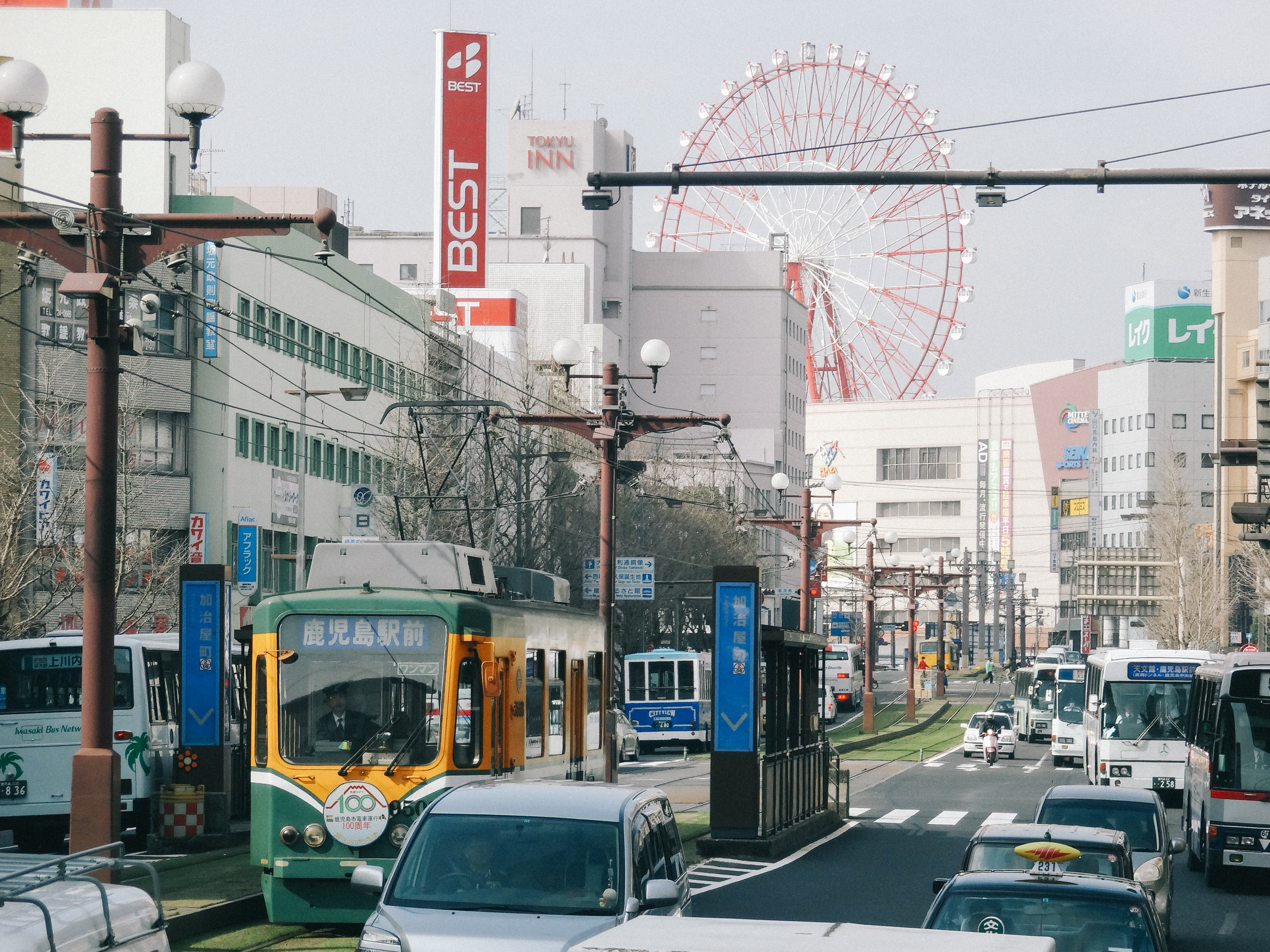
Kajiyachō Tram Stop with its back to the Kagoshima-Chūō Station Building having Ferris wheel

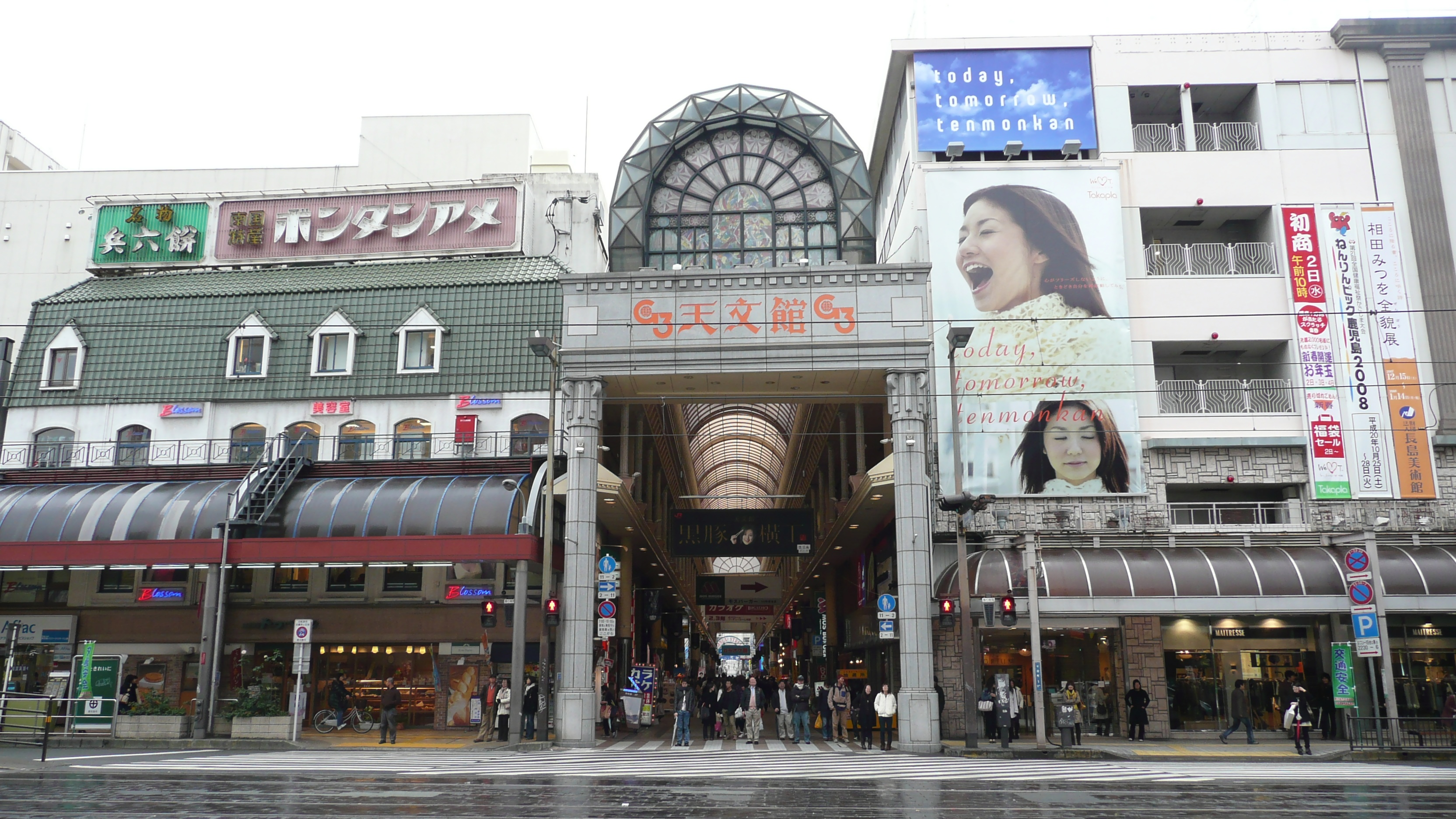
Tenmonkan shopping arcade

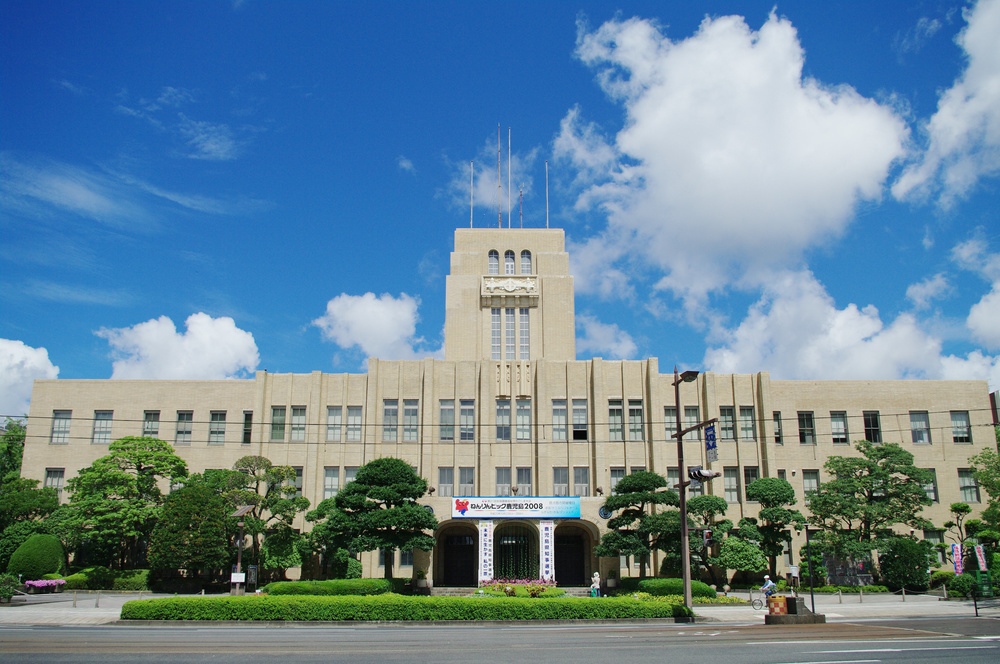
Kagoshima City Hall Main Building

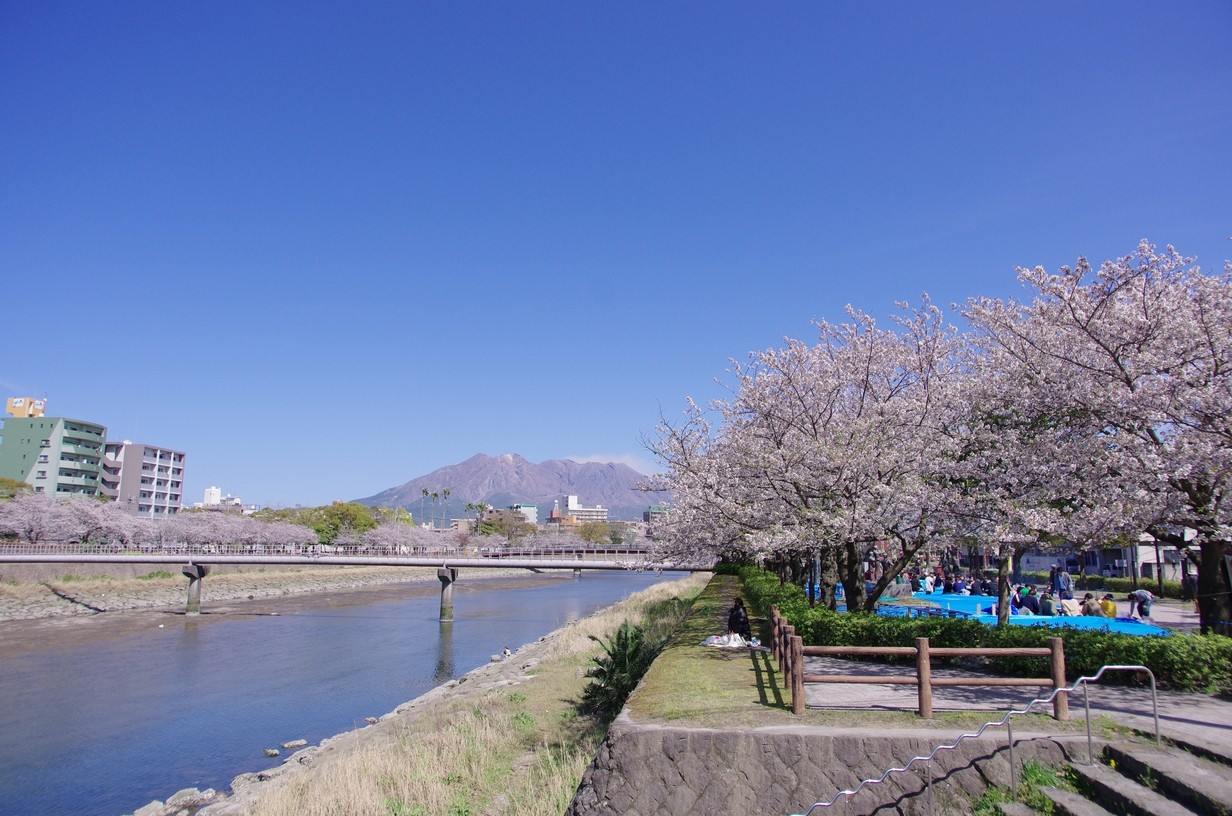
Kotsuki River that runs through Kagoshima City

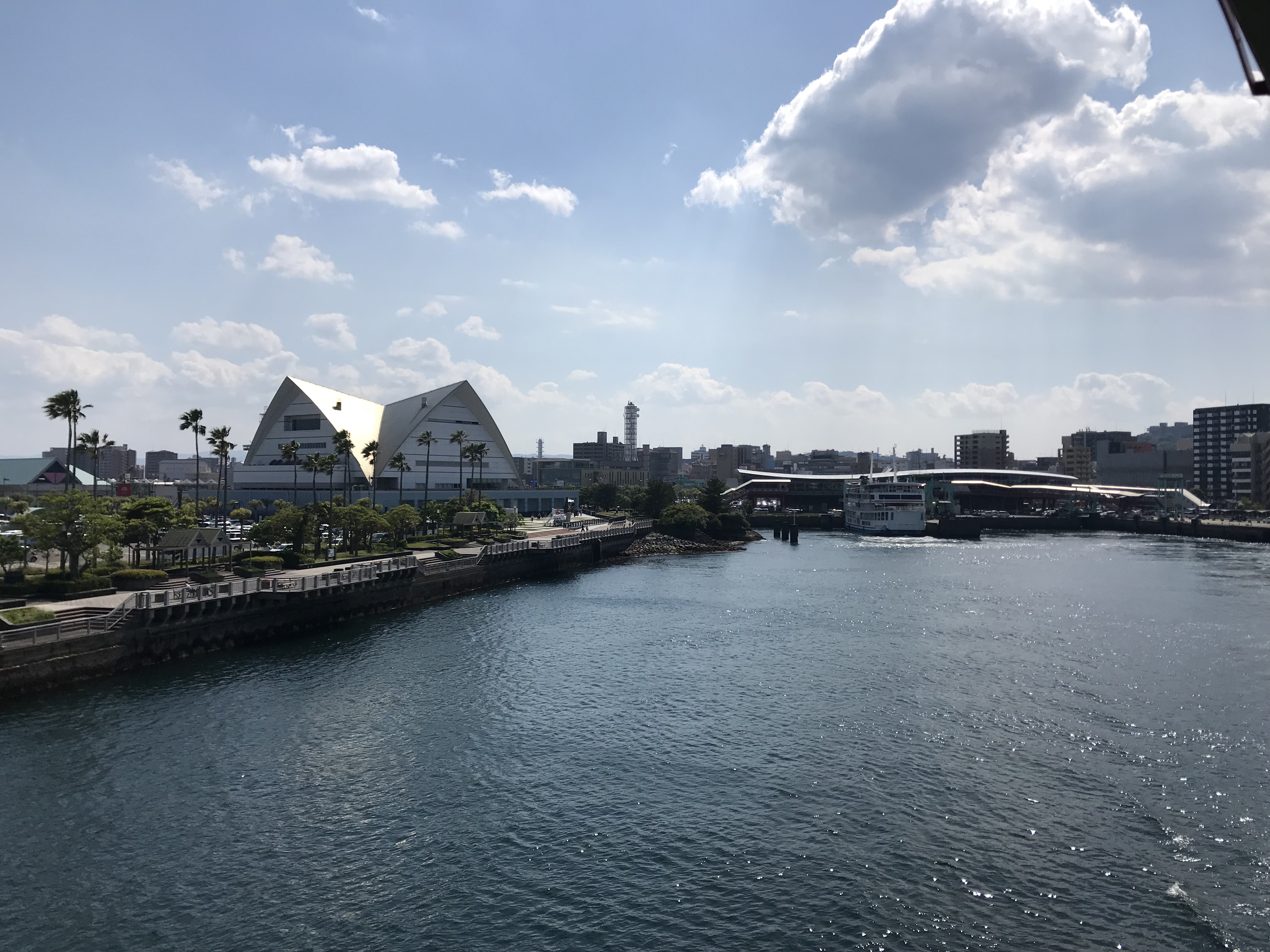
Kagoshima City Aquarium and Sakurajima Ferry Terminal

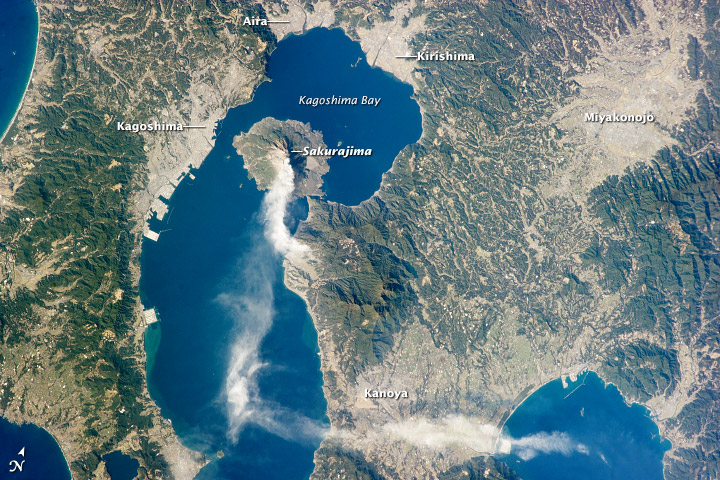
An image taken from the International Space Station showing Kagoshima and its surroundings on January 10, 2013

=== Neighboring municipalities ===
Kagoshima Prefecture

- Aira
- Hioki
- Ibusuki
- Minamikyūshū
- Minamisatsuma
- Satsumasendai
- Tarumizu

=== Climate ===
Kagoshima has a humid subtropical climate (Köppen climate classification Cfa), possessing the highest year average temperature and winter average temperature in mainland Japan. It is marked by mild, relatively dry winters; warm, humid springs; hot, humid summers; and mild, relatively dry autumns.

Climate data for Kagoshima (1991−2020 normals, extremes 1883−present)
Month	Jan	Feb	Mar	Apr	May	Jun	Jul	Aug	Sep	Oct	Nov	Dec	Year
Record high °C (°F)	23.9 (75.0)	24.3 (75.7)	28.6 (83.5)	30.2 (86.4)	31.7 (89.1)	34.6 (94.3)	37.8 (100.0)	38.4 (101.1)	35.7 (96.3)	34.0 (93.2)	29.5 (85.1)	24.7 (76.5)	38.4 (101.1)
Mean maximum °C (°F)	19.3 (66.7)	20.9 (69.6)	23.3 (73.9)	26.7 (80.1)	29.8 (85.6)	32.2 (90.0)	35.3 (95.5)	35.4 (95.7)	33.8 (92.8)	30.2 (86.4)	25.7 (78.3)	21.6 (70.9)	35.8 (96.4)
Mean daily maximum °C (°F)	13.1 (55.6)	14.6 (58.3)	17.5 (63.5)	21.8 (71.2)	25.5 (77.9)	27.5 (81.5)	31.9 (89.4)	32.7 (90.9)	30.2 (86.4)	25.8 (78.4)	20.6 (69.1)	15.3 (59.5)	23.1 (73.6)
Daily mean °C (°F)	8.7 (47.7)	9.9 (49.8)	12.8 (55.0)	17.1 (62.8)	21.0 (69.8)	24.0 (75.2)	28.1 (82.6)	28.8 (83.8)	26.3 (79.3)	21.6 (70.9)	16.2 (61.2)	10.9 (51.6)	18.8 (65.8)
Mean daily minimum °C (°F)	4.9 (40.8)	5.8 (42.4)	8.7 (47.7)	12.9 (55.2)	17.3 (63.1)	21.3 (70.3)	25.3 (77.5)	26.0 (78.8)	23.2 (73.8)	18.0 (64.4)	12.2 (54.0)	6.9 (44.4)	15.2 (59.4)
Mean minimum °C (°F)	−0.2 (31.6)	0.2 (32.4)	2.5 (36.5)	6.5 (43.7)	12.1 (53.8)	17.2 (63.0)	22.0 (71.6)	22.9 (73.2)	18.4 (65.1)	12.0 (53.6)	5.8 (42.4)	1.2 (34.2)	−0.9 (30.4)
Record low °C (°F)	−5.7 (21.7)	−6.7 (19.9)	−3.9 (25.0)	−1.0 (30.2)	3.9 (39.0)	9.0 (48.2)	15.9 (60.6)	16.5 (61.7)	9.3 (48.7)	2.6 (36.7)	−1.5 (29.3)	−5.5 (22.1)	−6.7 (19.9)
Average precipitation mm (inches)	78.3 (3.08)	112.7 (4.44)	161.0 (6.34)	194.9 (7.67)	205.2 (8.08)	570.0 (22.44)	365.1 (14.37)	224.3 (8.83)	222.9 (8.78)	104.6 (4.12)	102.5 (4.04)	93.2 (3.67)	2,434.7 (95.85)
Average snowfall cm (inches)	1 (0.4)	0 (0)	0 (0)	0 (0)	0 (0)	0 (0)	0 (0)	0 (0)	0 (0)	0 (0)	0 (0)	1 (0.4)	2 (0.8)
Average precipitation days (≥ 0.5 mm)	10.2	10.2	13.2	11.1	10.7	16.9	12.8	12.2	11.3	8.0	8.9	9.9	135.4
Average relative humidity (%)	66	65	66	68	71	78	76	74	72	67	68	67	70
Average dew point °C (°F)	2 (36)	4 (39)	6 (43)	10 (50)	15 (59)	20 (68)	23 (73)	24 (75)	21 (70)	15 (59)	10 (50)	4 (39)	13 (55)
Mean monthly sunshine hours	132.6	139.3	163.2	175.6	178.2	109.3	185.5	206.9	176.4	184.0	157.7	143.2	1,942.1
Average ultraviolet index	4	5	7	9	10	11	11	11	9	7	4	3	8
Source 1: Japan Meteorological Agency
Source 2: Weather Atlas (UV), Time and Date

Climate data for Kiire, Kagoshima (1991−2020 normals, extremes 1977−present)
Month	Jan	Feb	Mar	Apr	May	Jun	Jul	Aug	Sep	Oct	Nov	Dec	Year
Record high °C (°F)	23.6 (74.5)	24.6 (76.3)	28.2 (82.8)	29.2 (84.6)	32.9 (91.2)	34.5 (94.1)	38.1 (100.6)	38.6 (101.5)	36.5 (97.7)	33.1 (91.6)	28.7 (83.7)	25.5 (77.9)	38.6 (101.5)
Mean daily maximum °C (°F)	13.1 (55.6)	14.5 (58.1)	17.6 (63.7)	22.0 (71.6)	25.7 (78.3)	27.7 (81.9)	32.1 (89.8)	32.9 (91.2)	30.3 (86.5)	25.8 (78.4)	20.5 (68.9)	15.3 (59.5)	23.1 (73.6)
Daily mean °C (°F)	8.6 (47.5)	9.6 (49.3)	12.5 (54.5)	16.5 (61.7)	20.4 (68.7)	23.6 (74.5)	27.6 (81.7)	28.2 (82.8)	25.5 (77.9)	20.8 (69.4)	15.5 (59.9)	10.5 (50.9)	18.3 (64.9)
Mean daily minimum °C (°F)	4.1 (39.4)	4.9 (40.8)	7.6 (45.7)	11.4 (52.5)	15.6 (60.1)	20.2 (68.4)	24.1 (75.4)	24.6 (76.3)	21.7 (71.1)	16.4 (61.5)	10.8 (51.4)	6.0 (42.8)	14.0 (57.1)
Record low °C (°F)	−6.3 (20.7)	−3.6 (25.5)	−1.4 (29.5)	2.1 (35.8)	6.0 (42.8)	12.1 (53.8)	17.2 (63.0)	18.2 (64.8)	11.5 (52.7)	5.8 (42.4)	0.7 (33.3)	−2.6 (27.3)	−6.3 (20.7)
Average precipitation mm (inches)	98.9 (3.89)	136.8 (5.39)	193.2 (7.61)	229.9 (9.05)	231.2 (9.10)	634.5 (24.98)	385.2 (15.17)	228.2 (8.98)	249.8 (9.83)	115.0 (4.53)	126.4 (4.98)	107.5 (4.23)	2,765.7 (108.89)
Average precipitation days (≥ 1.0 mm)	10.2	10.2	12.9	10.7	10.5	16.8	12.6	11.6	11.0	7.9	8.5	9.5	132.4
Mean monthly sunshine hours	123.8	133.1	161.7	183.1	182.1	107.3	192.4	220.1	173.9	181.1	151.8	132.7	1,938.2
Source: Japan Meteorological Agency

== Demographics ==
Kagoshima prefecture population pyramid in 2020

As of 1 January 2020, Kagoshima City has an estimated population of 595,049 and a population density of 1,087 persons per km^{2}. The total area is 547.58 km^{2} (211 sq mi). According to the April 2014 issue of the Kagoshima Prefectural Summary by the Kagoshima Prefecture Department of Planning and Promotion, the population of the prefecture at large was 1,680,319. The city's total area nearly doubled between 2003 and 2005 as a result of five towns: the towns of Kōriyama and Matsumoto (both from Hioki District) the town of Kiire (from Ibusuki District) and the towns of Sakurajima and Yoshida (both from Kagoshima District). All areas were merged into Kagoshima City on 1 November 2004.

Historical population

Year	Pop.	±%
1960	383,418	—
1965	415,439	+8.4%
1970	444,165	+6.9%
1975	496,802	+11.9%
1980	547,756	+10.3%

Year	Pop.	±%
1985	574,672	+4.9%
1990	582,252	+1.3%
1995	594,430	+2.1%
2000	601,693	+1.2%
2005	604,367	+0.4%

Year	Pop.	±%
2010	605,940	+0.3%
2015	599,814	−1.0%
2020	593,128	−1.1%

Kagoshima population statistics

=== Administrative mergers ===
- On August 1, 1934 – the Villages of Yoshino, Nakagōriu and Nishitakeda, all from Kagoshima District, were merged into Kagoshima.
- On October 1, 1950 – the Villages of Ishiki and Higashisakurajima (both from Kagoshima District) were merged into Kagoshima.
- On April 29, 1967 – the Cities of Kagoshima and Taniyama were merged and became city of new Kagoshima.
- On November 1, 2004 – the Towns of Yoshida and Sakurajima (both from Kagoshima District); the Towns of Matsumoto and Koriyama (both from Hioki District); and the town of Kiire (from Ibusuki District) were merged into Kagoshima.

=== Sakurajima ===
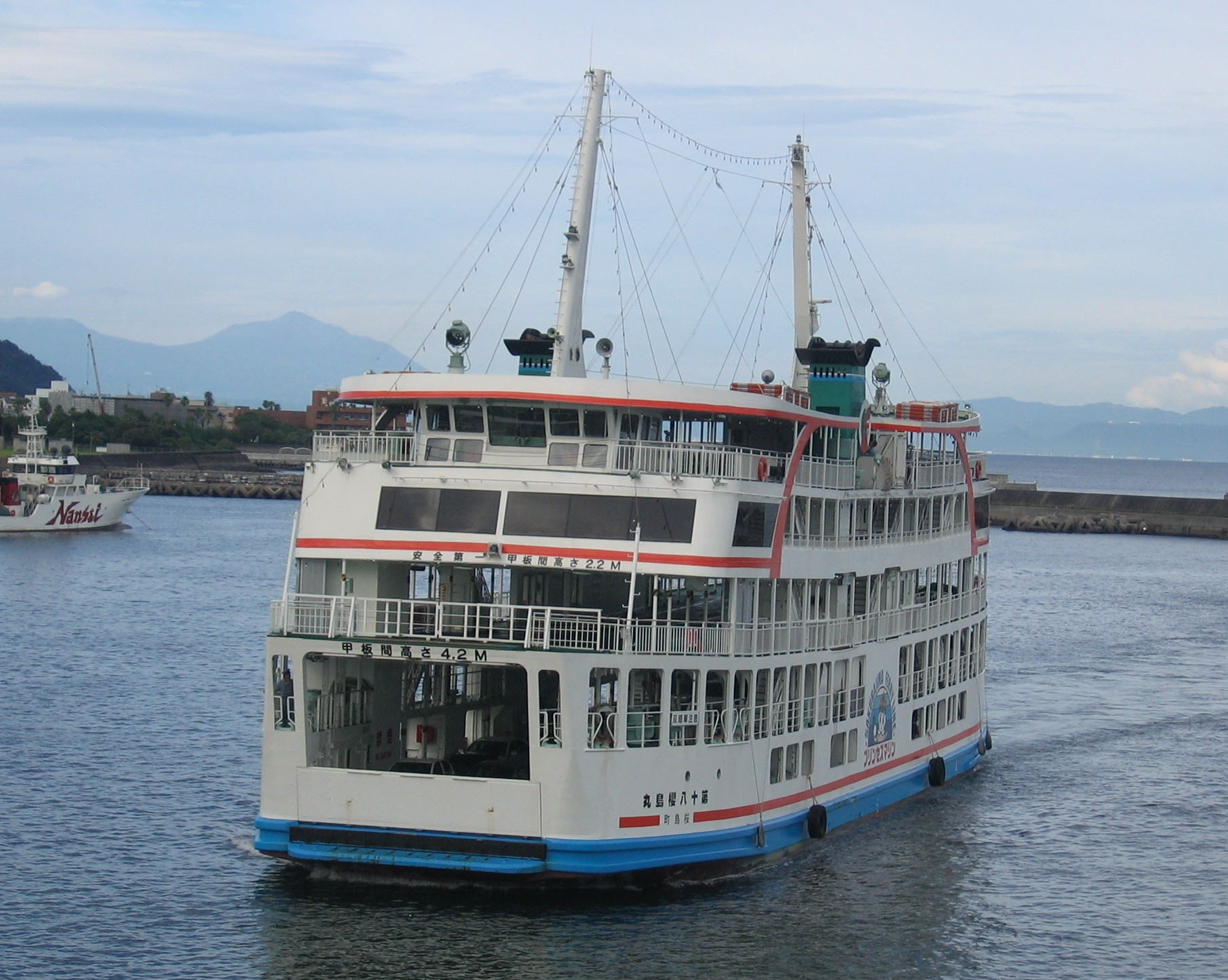
Sakurajima Ferry, linking former Sakurajima Town and Kagoshima City (Taken on July 9, 2004)

Sakurajima (桜島町, Sakurajima-chō) is a settlement on Sakurajima island that was previously a municipally distinct town located in Kagoshima District, Kagoshima Prefecture, Japan. As of 2003, the town had an estimated population of 4,504 and a density of 139.88 persons per km^{2}. The total area was 32.20 km^{2}.

== Government ==
Kagoshima has a mayor-council form of government with a directly elected mayor and a unicameral city council of 45 members. Kagoshma contributes 17 members to the Kagoshima Prefectural Assembly. In terms of national politics, the city is divided between the Kagoshima 1st district and Kagoshima 2nd district of the lower house of the Diet of Japan.

== Economy ==
Kagoshima is a regional commercial center, with an economy centered on light manufacturing, tourism and commercial fishing.

== Education ==
=== Universities and colleges ===
- The International University of Kagoshima
- Kagoshima Immaculate Heart College
- Kagoshima Prefectural College
- Kagoshima University
- Kagoshima Women's College
- Shigakukan University

=== Primary and secondary education ===
Kagoshima has 79 public elementary schools, 38 public junior high schools, two public high schools and one combined junior/senior high school operated by the city government and 11 public high schools operated by the Kagoshima Prefectural Board of Education. There is one combined national elementary/middle school. There are also 14 private high schools. The prefecture also operates seven special education schools for the handicapped.

== Transportation ==
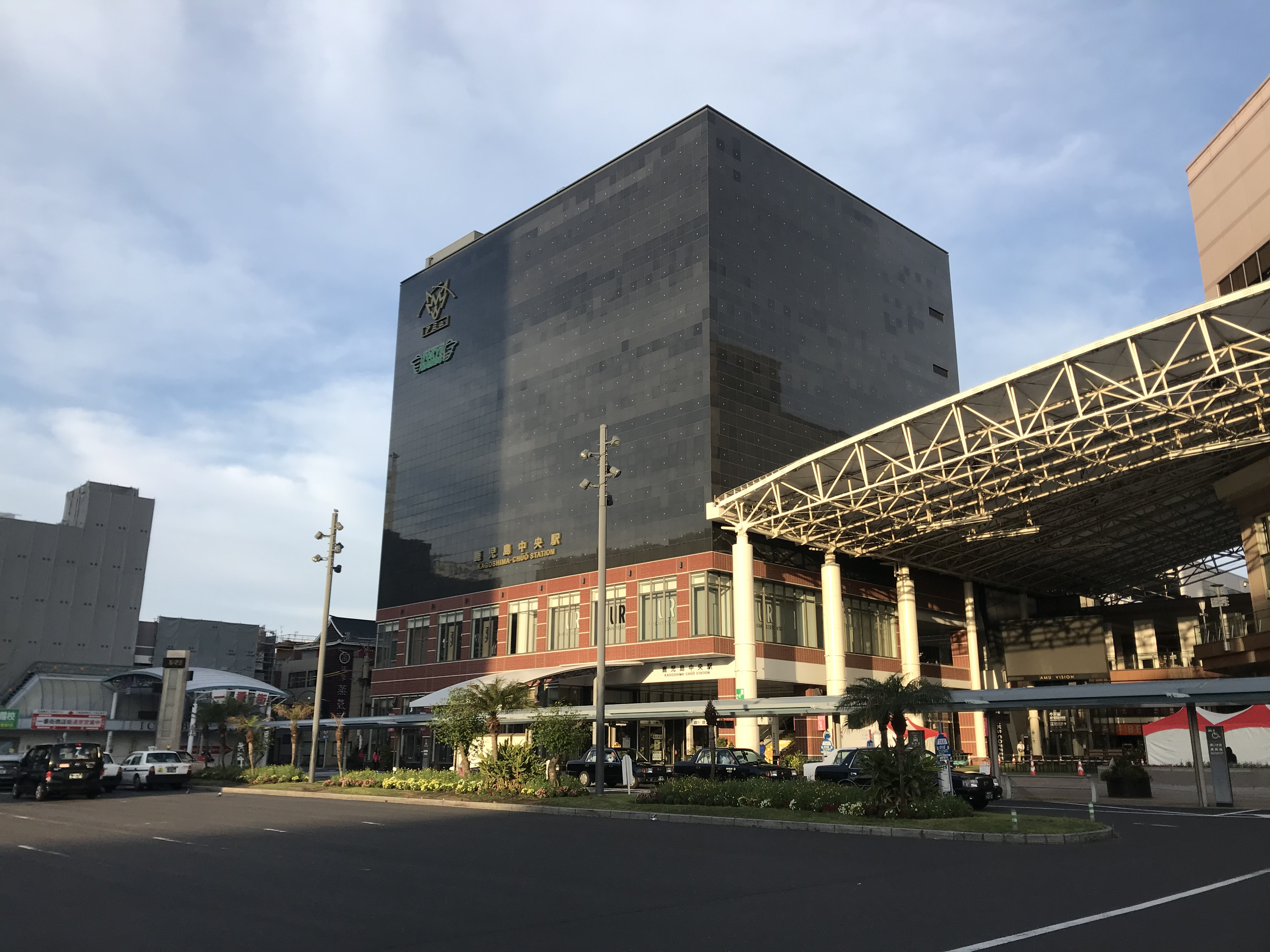
Kagoshima-Chūō Station

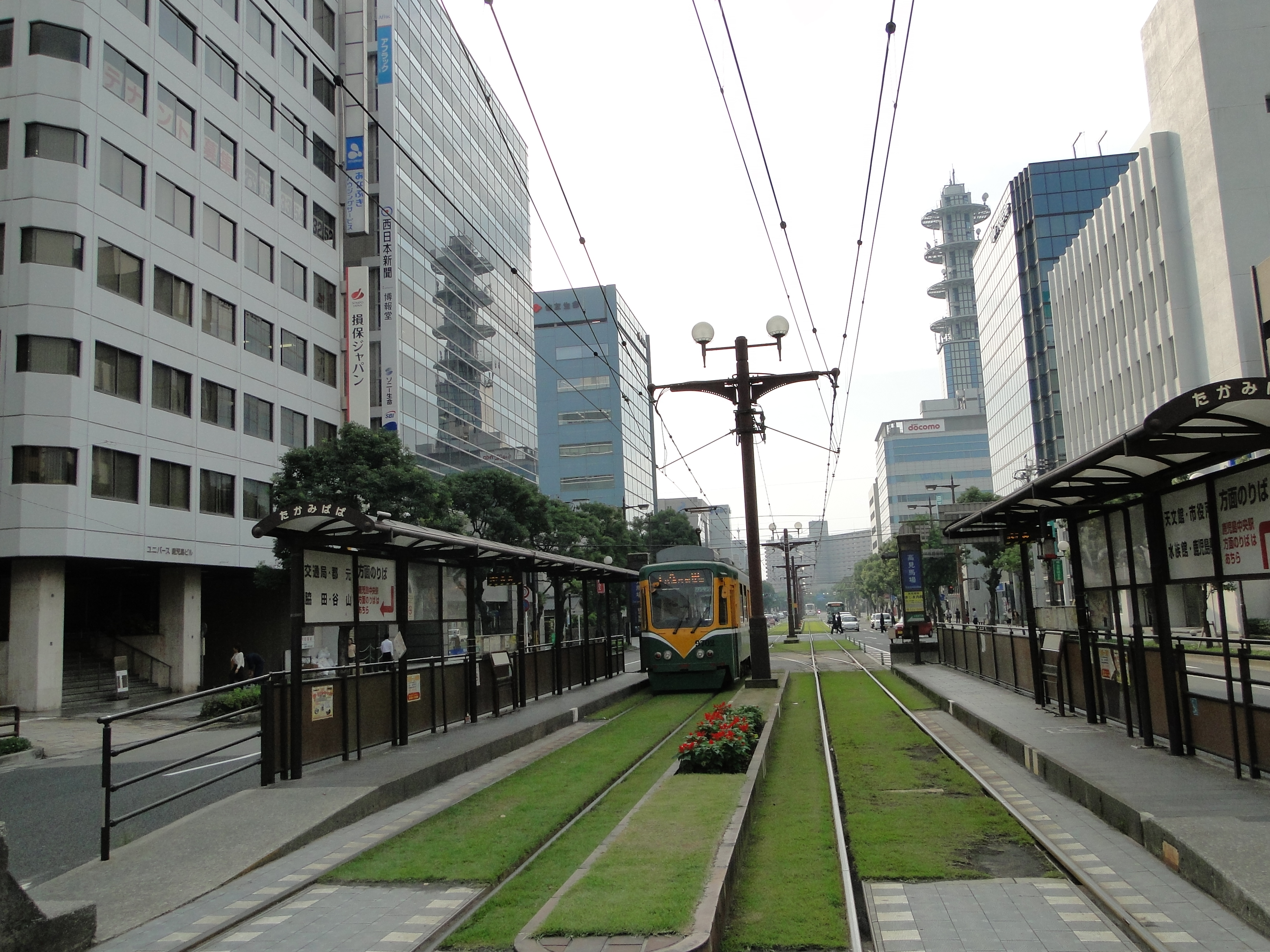
Kagoshima city tram Taniyama Line

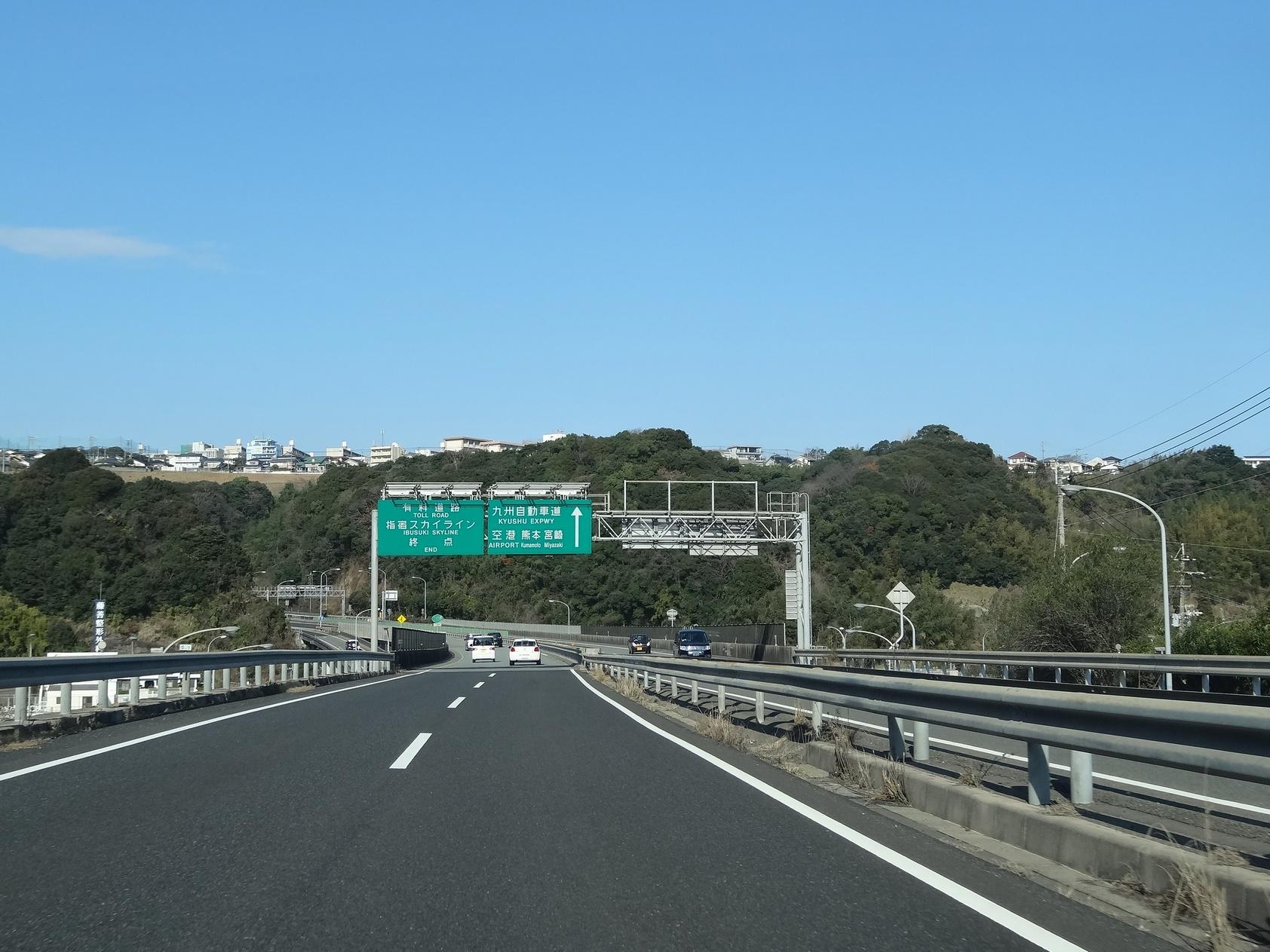
Kyushu Expressway

=== Airport ===
Kagoshima Airport in Kirishima (35 km (22 miles) NE of Kagoshima)

=== Railways ===
JR Kyushu - Kyushu Shinkansen

Kagoshima Main Line Kagoshima-Chūō

JR Kyushu - Kagoshima Main Line

JA Satsuma-Matsumoto - Kami-Ijuin - Kagoshima-Chūō - Kagoshima

JR Kyushu - Nippō Main Line

■ Ryūgamizu - Sengan-en - Kagoshima

JR Kyushu - Ibusuki Makurazaki Line

■ Kagoshima-Chūō - Kōrimoto - Minami-Kagoshima - Usuki - Taniyama - Jigenji - Sakanoue - Goino - Hirakawa - Sesekushi - Nakamyō - Kiire - Maenohama - Nukumi

=== Tramway ===
- Kagoshima City Transportation Bureau Taniyama Line
- Kagoshima City Transportation Bureau Korimoto Line

=== Highways ===
- Kyushu Expressway
- Minamikyushu Expressway
- National Route 3
- National Route 10
- National Route 58
- National Route 224
- National Route 225
- National Route 226
- National Route 328

=== Ferry/Jetfoil ===
- A Line (to southern islands)
- Marix Line (to southern islands)
- RKK Line (to Okinawa, cargo only)
- Sakurajima Ferry
- Seahawk (to Koshikijima Islands)
- Toppy (to Tanegashima and Yakushima)

== Sister cities ==
Kagoshima is twinned with:

- Changsha, China, since 1982
- Miami, United States, since 1990
- Naples, Italy, since 1960
- Perth, Australia, since 1974
- Strasbourg, France, since 2019
- Tsuruoka, Japan, since 1969

== Local attractions ==
- Ishibashi Park
- Kagoshima Castle
- Shiroyama Koen It is a park with panoramic views of Kagoshima
- Kagoshima City Art Museum It's a place where you can see various art exhibitions
- Kagoshima City Aquarium, situated near the Sakurajima Ferry Terminal, was established in 1997 along the docks and offers a direct view of Sakurajima.
- Museum of the Meiji Restoration
- Sengan-en Garden, originally a villa belonging to the Shimazu clan and is still maintained by descendants today. Outside the garden grounds is a Satsuma "kiriko" cut glass factory where visitors are welcome to view the glass blowing and cutting processes, and the Shoko Shūseikan Museum, which was built in 1865 and registered as a National Historic Site in 1959. The former Shuseikan industrial complex and the former machine factory were submitted to the UNESCO World Heritage as part of a group list titled Modern Industrial Heritage Sites in Kyushu and Yamaguchi Prefecture.
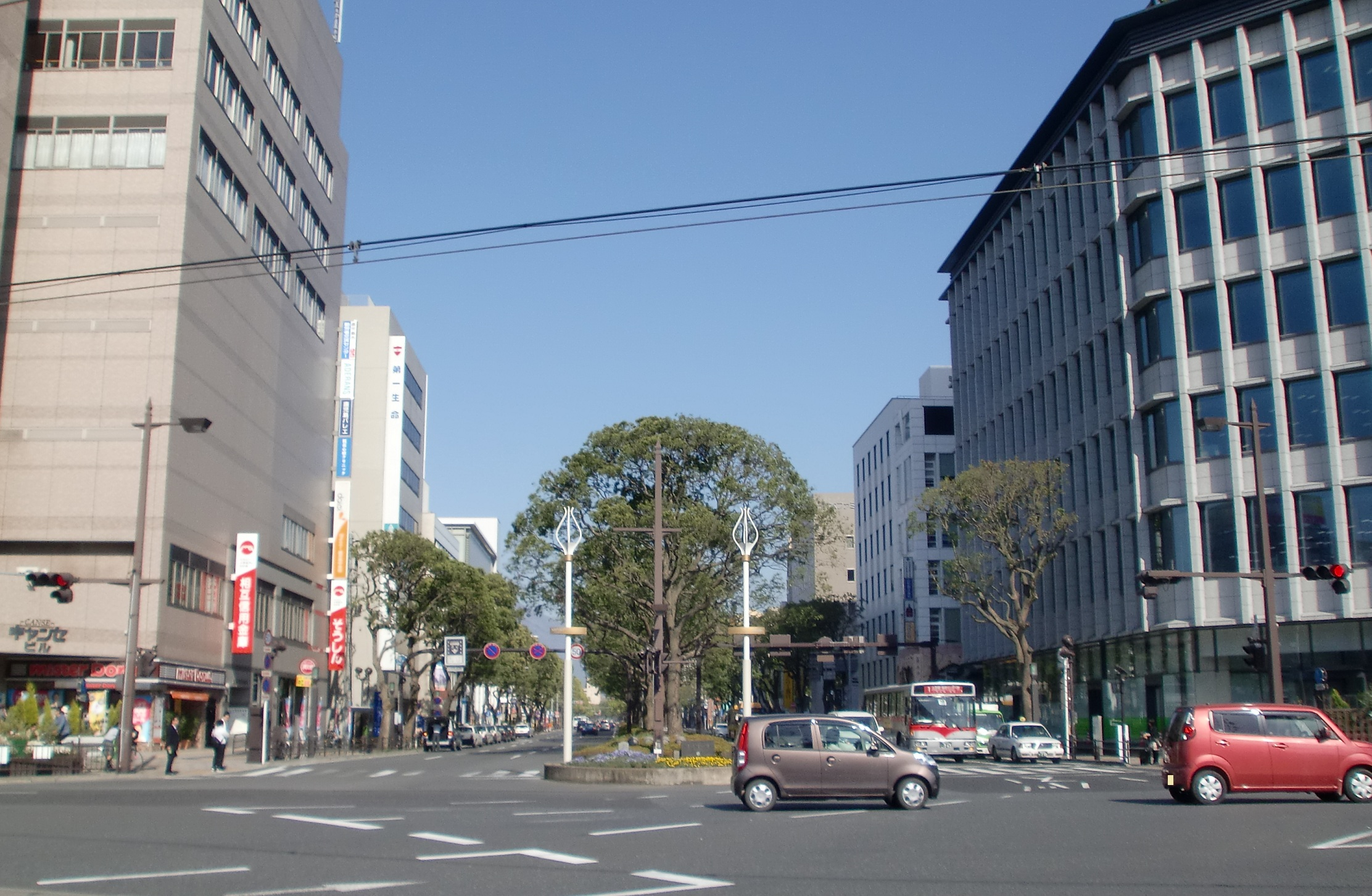
Naples Street in Kagoshima

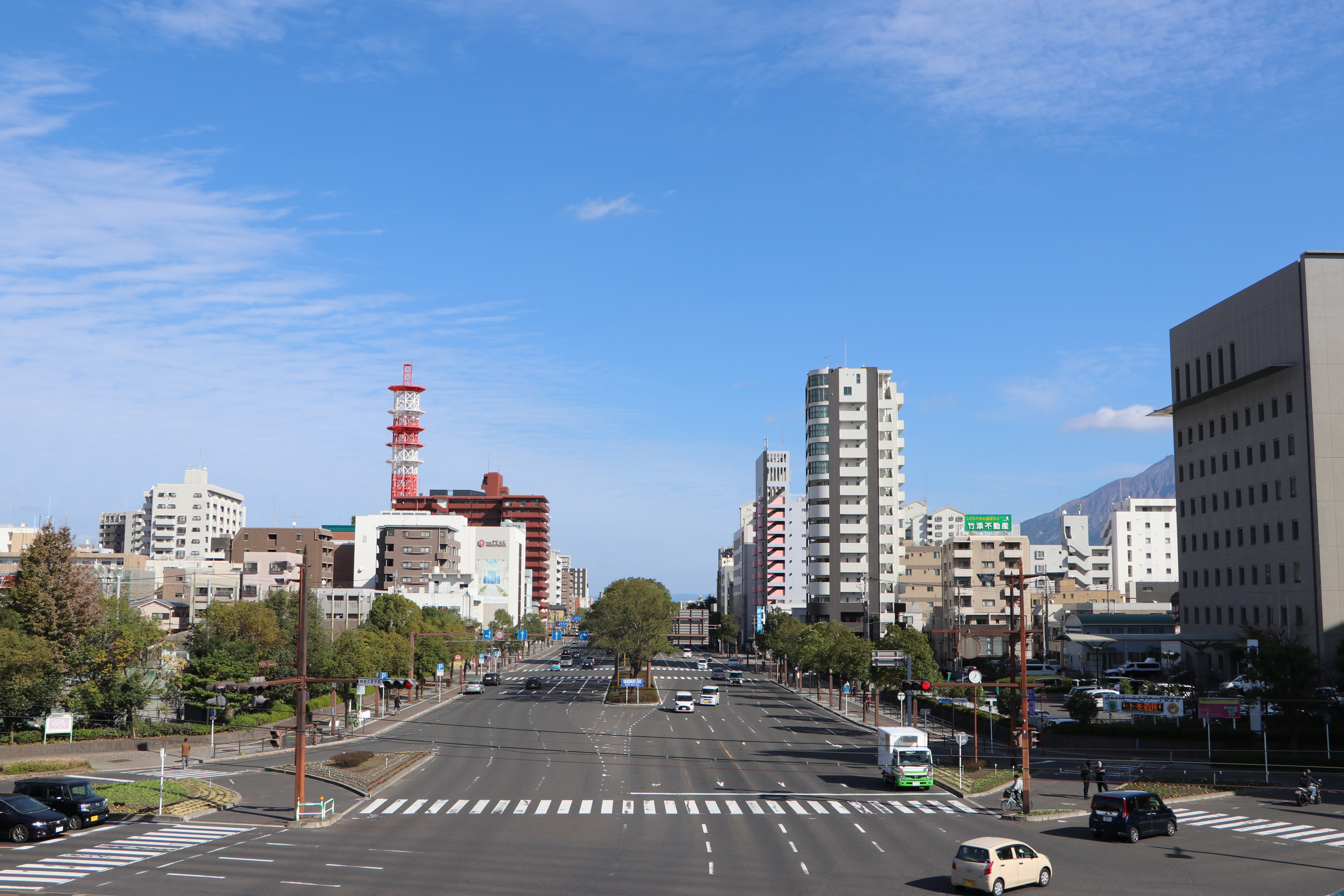
Perth Street in Kagoshima

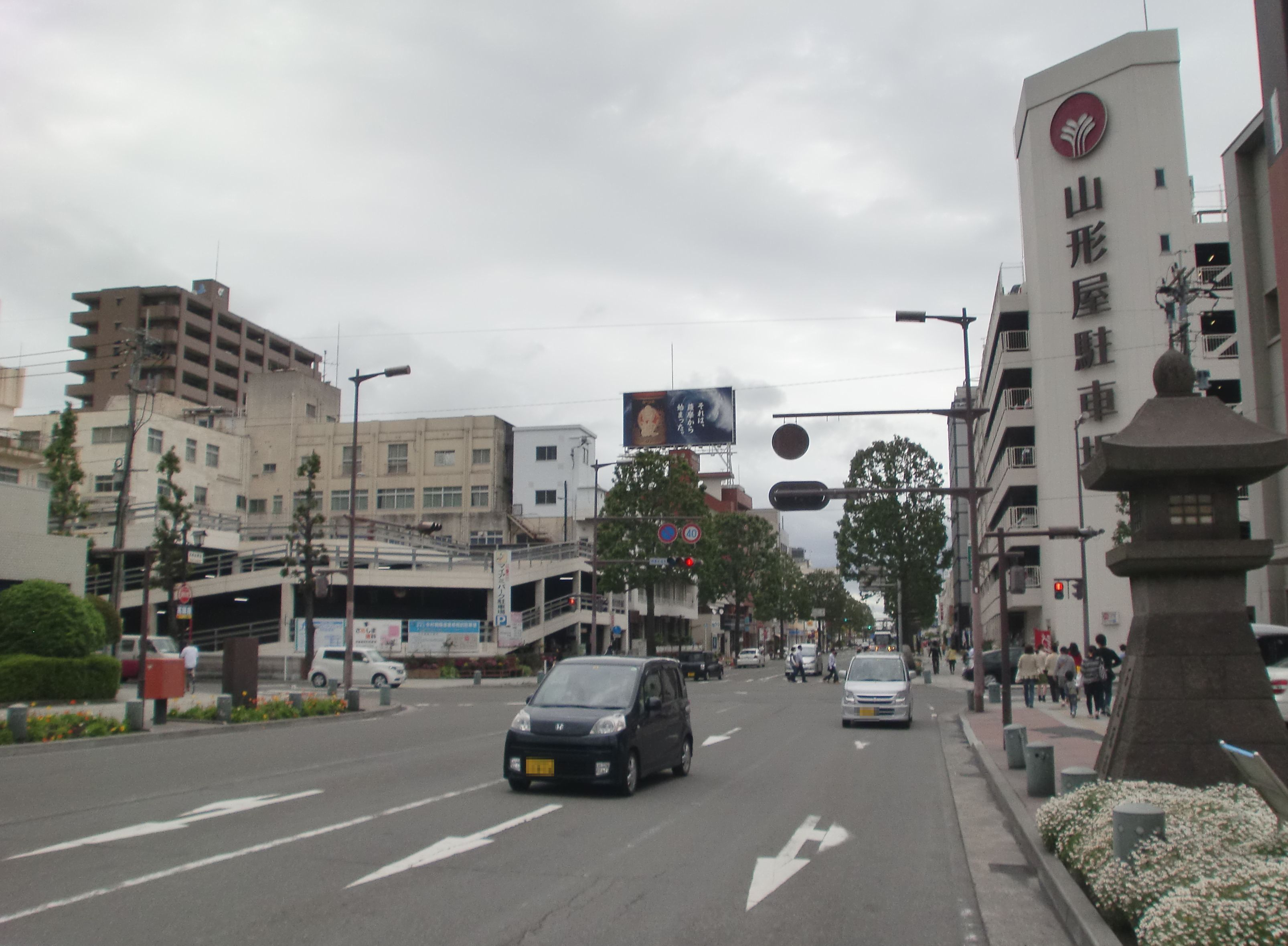
Miami Street in Kagoshima

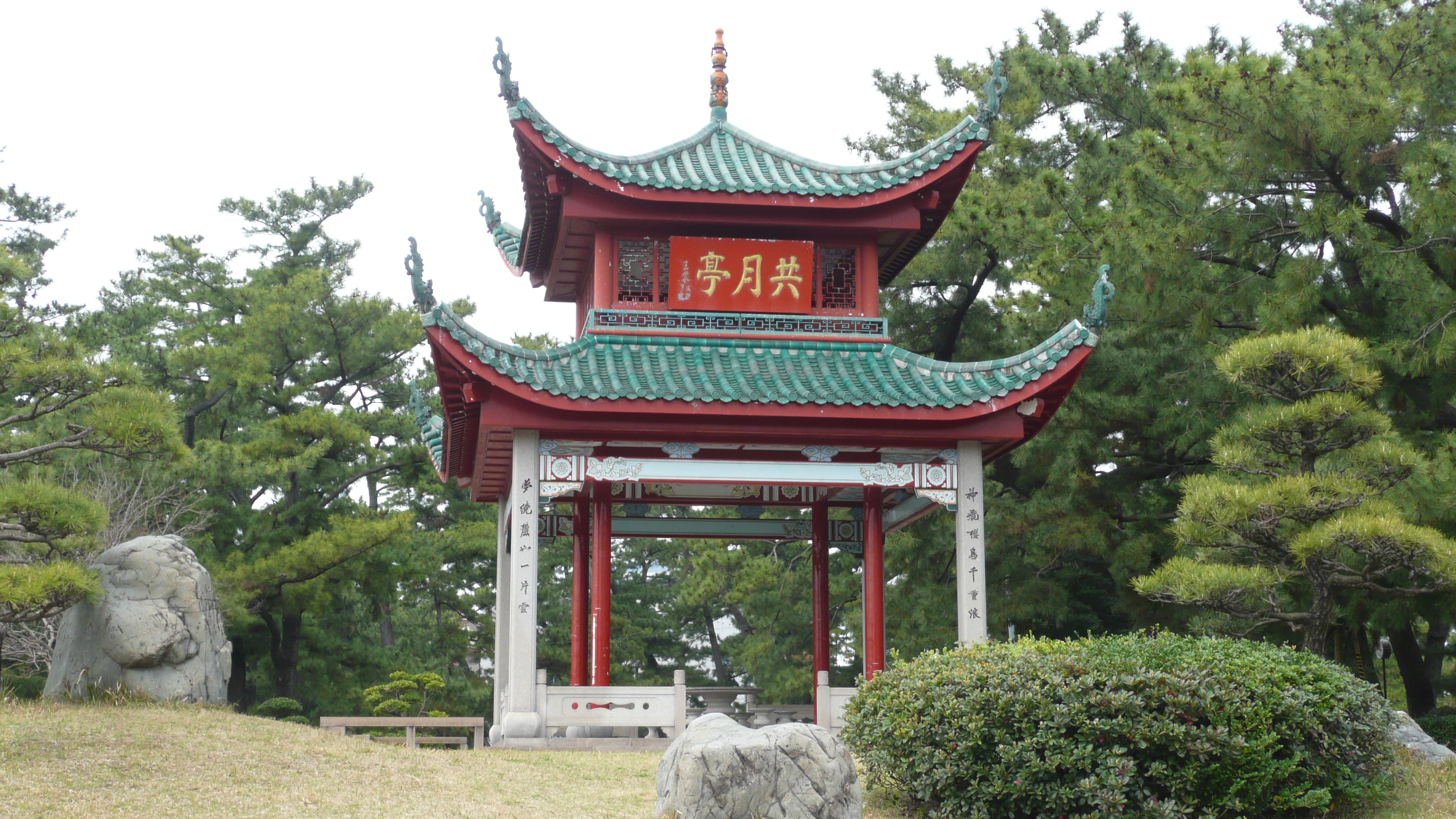
Kyogetsu-Tei in Kagoshima commemorating the friendship city relationship with Changsha

=== Sports ===
Kagoshima was one of the host cities of the official 1998 Women's Volleyball World Championship. Kagoshima is home to Kagoshima United. They play their home games at Kagoshima Kamoike Stadium.

== Notable people ==
- Akitsune Imamura – seismologist
- Bernardo the Japanese – Christian convert, disciple of Saint Francis Xavier, and first Japanese to set foot in Europe
- Emi Hashino – comedian
- Hiroko Ōta – politician, economic researcher
- Hiroshi Kawauchi – politician
- Ikki Sawamura – model, actor, TV presenter
- Izumi Inamori – actress
- Junichi Miyashita – swimmer
- Kabayama Sukenori – samurai military leader and statesman
- Kaneta Kimotsuki – voice actor (1935–2016)
- Kazuo Inamori – philanthropist, entrepreneur, founder of Kyocera Corporation and KDDI Corporation, and chairman of Japan Airlines
- Kawasaki Shōzō – Industrialist, founder of the Kawasaki Heavy Industries and K Line groups
- Kōhei Miyauchi – actor
- Koji Maeda – football player
- Kiyotaka Kuroda – politician, second Prime Minister of Japan
- Masao Suenaga – driver
- Miyo Yoshida – professional boxer
- Mone Kamishiraishi – singer and actress
- Morihiko Nakahara – conductor
- Norihiro Nakajima – manga artist of Astro Team, etc.
- Ryuji Fujiyama – football player
- Saigō Takamori – politician, samurai
- Sakura Miyawaki – Japanese idol singer and actress, member of Le Sserafim
- Saori Sakoda – volleyball player
- Seiki Kuroda – artist
- Shinobu Kaitani – manga artist
- Taisei Okazaki – DJ & music producer
- Takuya Shiihara – football player
- Tōgō Heihachirō - Admiral of the Imperial Japanese Navy
- Toru Kamikawa – football referee
- Toshimichi Ōkubo – statesman, samurai, and one of the Three Great Nobles who led to the Meiji Restoration
- Yasuhito Endō – football player
- Yoshito Kajiya – politician
- Yuki Kashiwagi – Japanese idol singer
- Yuya Hikichi – football player

== See also ==
- Kagoshima ramen
- Sakurajima daikon
- Godzilla vs. Spacegodzilla
- Goodnight Punpun
