= Taisei =

Taisei may refer to:

- Taisei (泰西, literally "Far West"), a historical Japanese name for the "Far West", a.k.a. Europe
- Taisei (given name)
- Taisei (Ryukyu), a chief of the Ryūkyū Islands
- Taisei Corporation, a construction company
- Taisei Yokusankai, a fascist party of Imperial Japan
