= Shigakukan University =

Private university in Kagoshima, Japan

Coordinates: 31°33′32″N 130°32′35″E

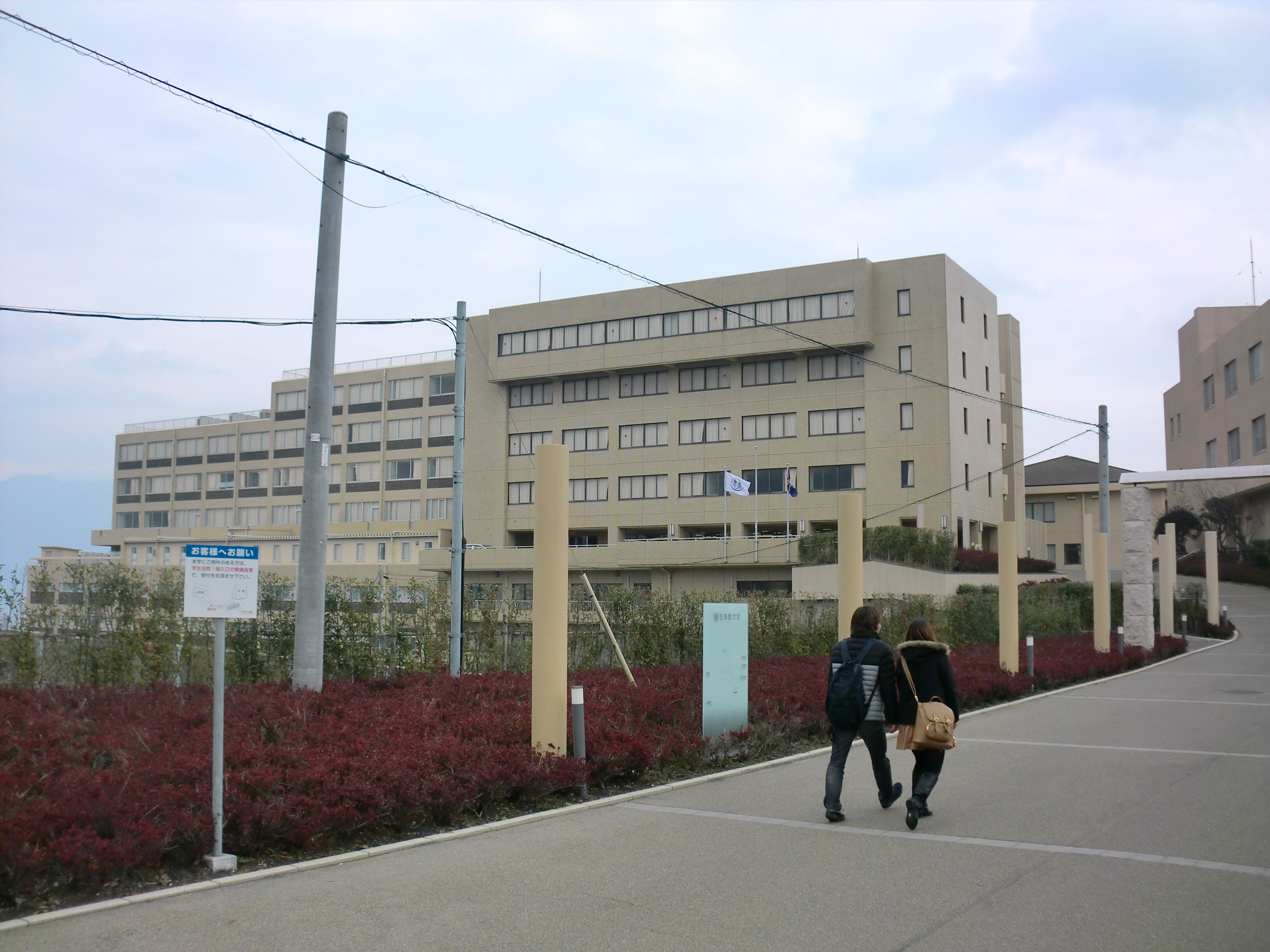
Shigakukan University

Shigakukan University (志學館大学, shigakukan daigaku) is a private university in Kagoshima, Kagoshima, Japan. The predecessor of the school was founded in 1907, and it was chartered as a women's university in 1979. In 1999, it became a co-ed institution and adopted the present name.
