= Kagoshima Immaculate Heart College =

Coordinates: 31°33′51″N 130°32′17″E

- 鹿児島純心女子短期大学
- Type: private
- Established: 1960
- Location: Kagoshima, Kagoshima Prefecture, Japan
- Website: www.k-junshin.ac.jp/juntan/

Kagoshima Immaculate Heart College (鹿児島純心女子短期大学, Kagoshima Junshin Joshi Tanki Daigaku) is a private junior college in the city of Kagoshima in Japan. It was established in 1960, and has been attached to Kagoshima Immaculate Heart University since 1994.

== Departments ==
- Department of home economics
- Department of English studies

== See also ==
- List of junior colleges in Japan
