= Kagoshima Women's Junior College =

Private women's junior college in Kagoshima, Kagoshima, Japan

Coordinates: 31°34′57″N 130°33′05″E

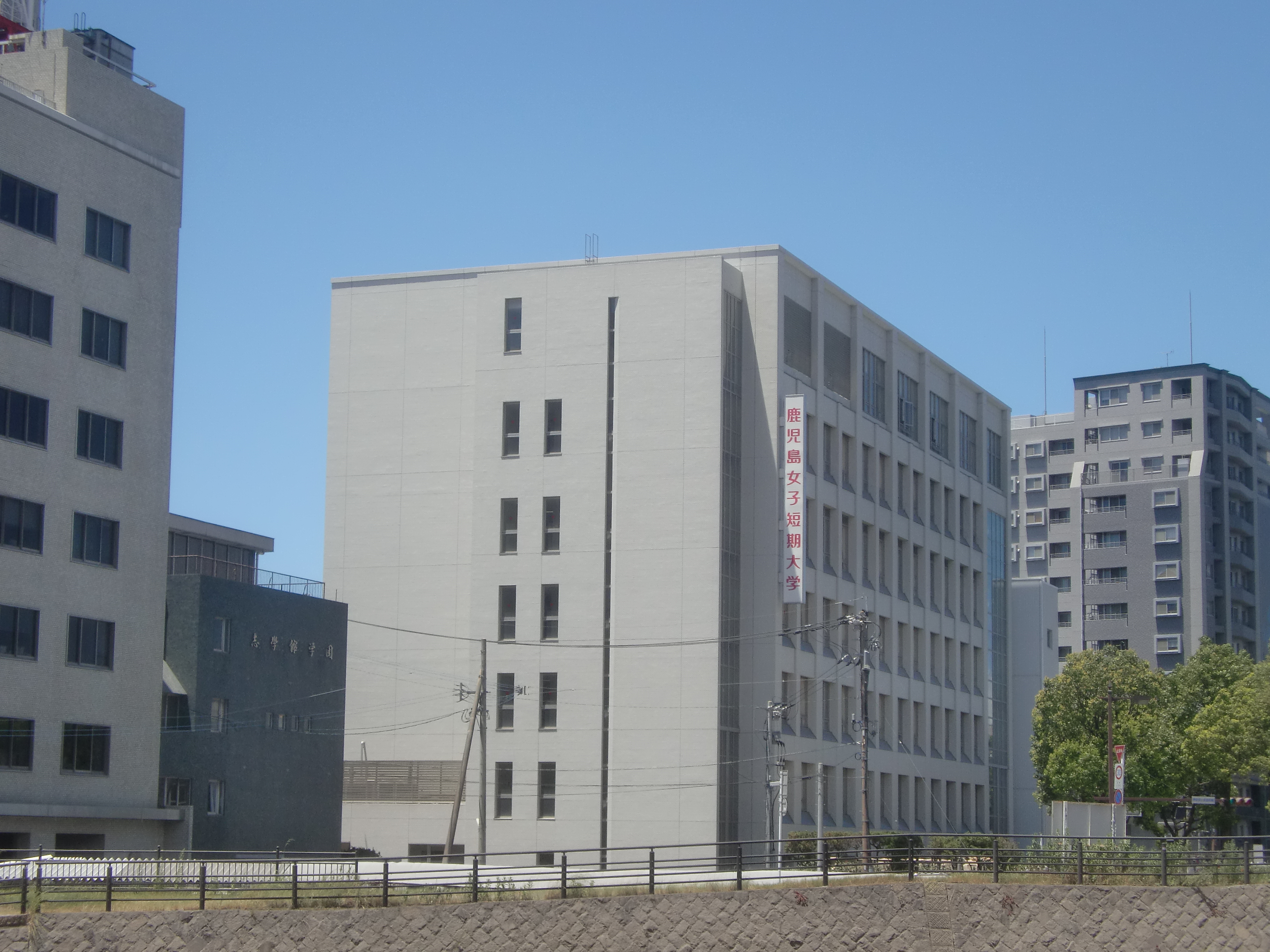
Kagoshima Women's Junior College

Kagoshima Women's Junior College or Kagoshima Women's College (鹿児島女子短期大学, Kagoshima joshi tanki daigaku) is a private women's junior college in Kagoshima, Kagoshima, Japan, established in 1965.
