= Taisei (given name) =

- Gender: Male

Origin
- Origin: Japanese
- Meaning: Different meanings depending on the kanji used

Taisei (written: 大成, 泰成, 太勢, 大晟 or 大聖) is a masculine Japanese given name. Notable people with the name include:

- Taisei (Ryukyu) (大成; 1247-1309), Japanese chief of the Ryukyu Islands
- Taisei Fujita (藤田 泰成; born 1982), Japanese former football player
- Taisei Iwasaki (岩崎 太整; born 1979), Japanese musician
- Taisei Kaneko (金子 大晟; born 1998), Japanese football player
- Taisei Makihara (牧原 大成; born 1992), Japanese professional baseball player
- Taisei Marukawa (丸川 太誠; born 1997), Japanese football player
- Taisei Miyashiro (宮代 大聖; born 2000), Japanese football player
- Taisei Okazaki (born 1982), Japanese musician, DJ and music producer
- Taisei Ota (翁田 大勢; born 1999), Japanese professional baseball player
- Taisei Yamamoto (山本 泰成; born 2001), Japanese freestyle skier
