= Kagoshima Prefectural College =

Public junior college in Japan

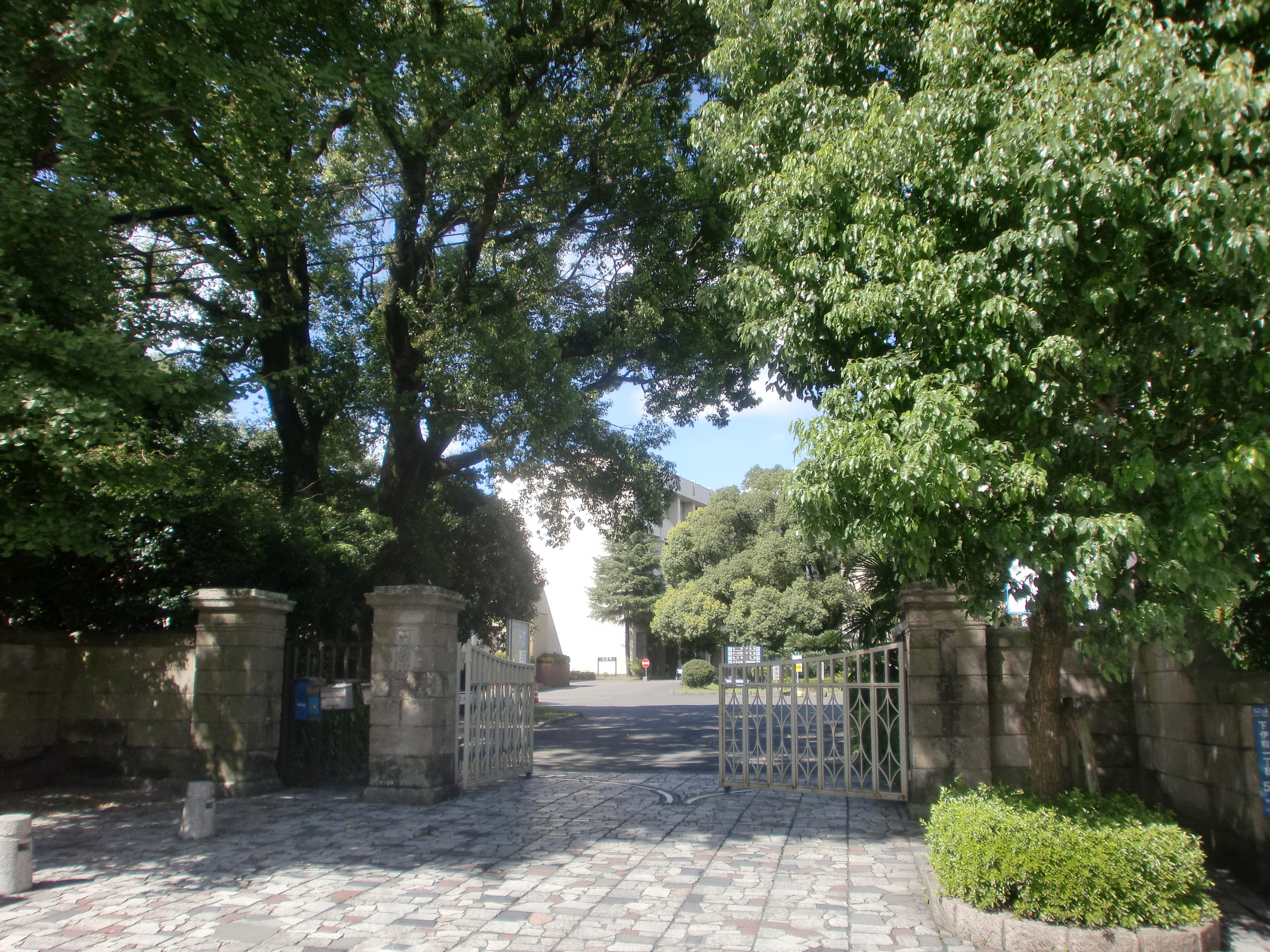
Kagoshima prefectural College

Kagoshima Prefectural College (鹿児島県立短期大学, Kagoshima-kenritsu tanki daigaku) is a public prefectural junior college in Kagoshima, Kagoshima, Japan, established in 1950. The predecessor of the school was founded in 1922.
