= Sakurajima Ferry =

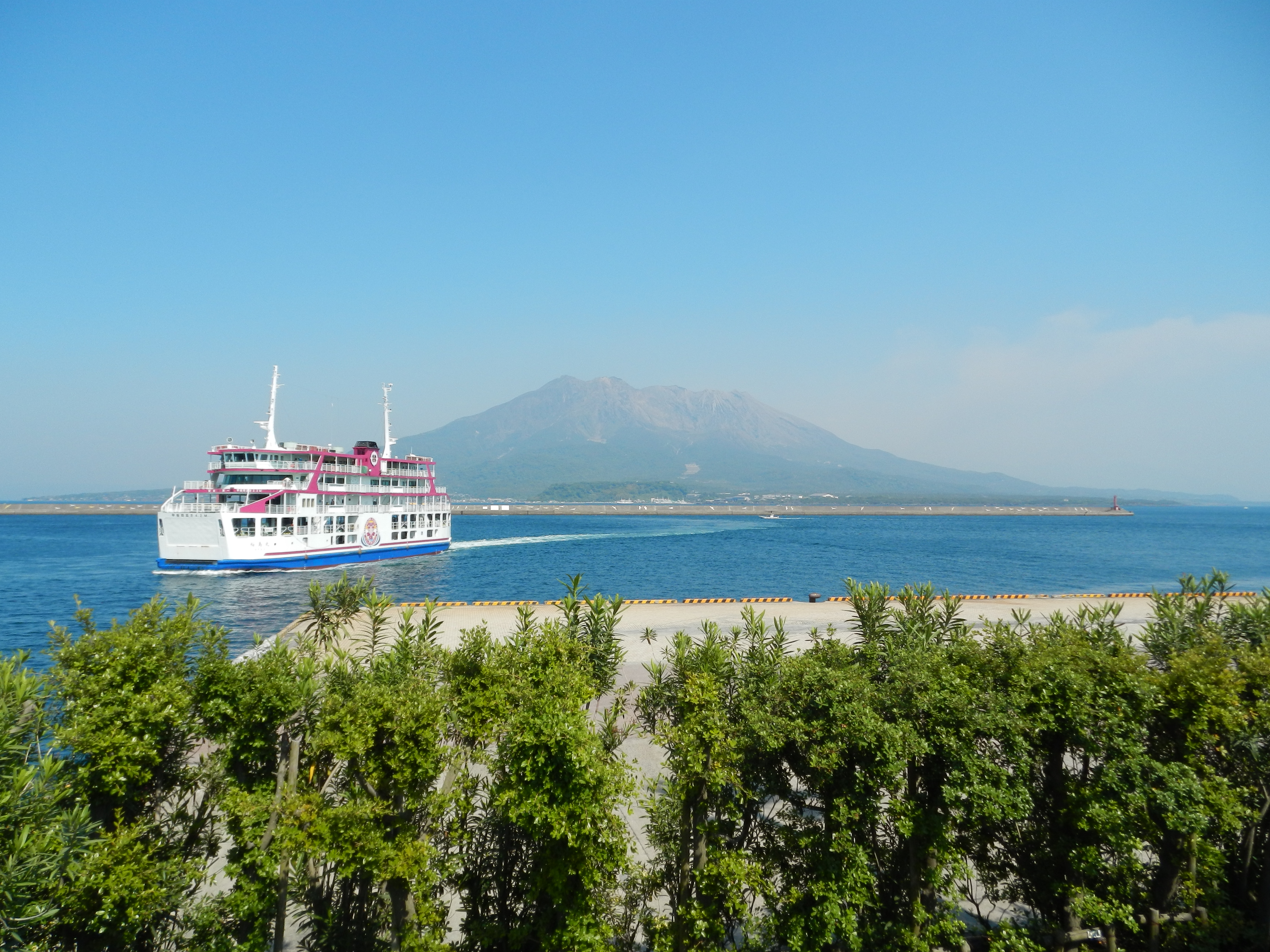
Sakurajima Ferry and Sakurajima at Port of Kagoshima.

The Sakurajima Ferry (桜島フェリー, Sakurajima Ferī) is a Japanese ferry which links between Kagoshima Port and Sakurajima Port, both in Kagoshima prefecture. It is administered by Kagoshima City Ship Department.

== Overview ==
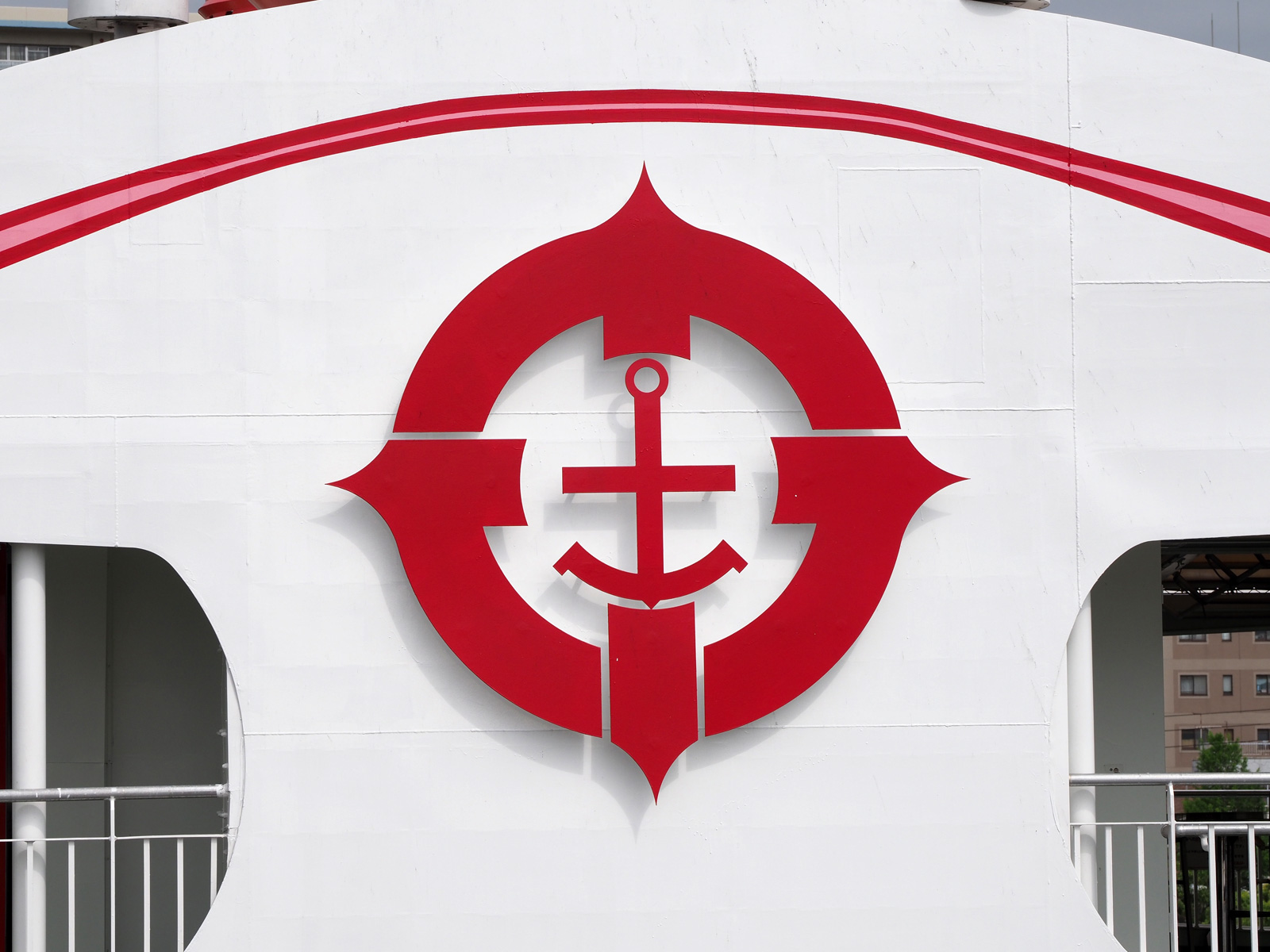
Mark of Kagoshima City Ship Department.

In 1914, the eruption of Mt. Sakurajima affected the islands inhabitants. They demanded a regular ferry service between Sakurajima and Kagoshima City for emergency restoration and commuting as part of educational development. Thus, a ferry line was established by Sakurajima village office on November 19, 1934. The number of ferries increased, and nowadays there is one ferry every 10 minutes during the daytime and every hour during the night. It takes about 13 minutes to go the 3.5 km across the bay. In 2004, the ferries carried 5.5 million people and 1.64 million vehicles. The reason for there being such a large number of passengers way beyond the number of inhabitants in Sakurajima is the great reduction in the time required compared with the land route.

In the event of Sakurajima erupting, there are special places to anchor the ferry for evacuation of the inhabitants. When heavy rains caused floods in August 1993, Sakurajima ferries helped to rescue residents cut off in the Ryūgamizu area. At the time, the Ryūgamizu area had no place for ferries to anchor, so local fishing boats helped take people from the shore to the ferries. During summer, one ferry is operated as excursion ship (to enjoy sights, drinking and in some instances fireworks). Ferries can also be chartered for weddings, etc.

There is an udon restaurant called Yabukin on each ferry. In spite of that people have to eat the udon in a mere 15 minutes, it is extremely popular.

== Chronology ==
- August 1930: Shōwa-maru launched (with 70 seats)
- November 19, 1934: Service started
- October 1939: Started to connect with bases of Sakurajima
- 1941: Sakurajima-maru launched (can carry three freight cars)
- July 1, 1944: Quay maintenance finished and started to carry cars
- October 1951: Two ferries were damaged by Typhoon Ruth
- December 1962 - March 1970: Hydrofoil service started
- 1974: Service every 10 minutes started
- 1978: Summer excursion ships started
- April 1984: 24-hours service started
- August 6, 1993: Involved in rescue operations in Ryūgamizu
- November 1, 2004: With the merger of Sakurajima town into Kagoshima city, the administering authority changed from Sakurajima town to Kagoshima city

== Ferries in service ==
- Sakurajima-maru – Completed in November, 1987, 502 tonnes, 53m long
- Sakurajima-maru No. 15 – Completed in January 1995 1,134 tonnes, 56.1m long, nicknamed Cherry Queen
- Sakurajima-maru No. 16 – Completed in January 1999, 997 tonnes, 54.2m long, nicknamed Dolphin Liner
- Sakurajima-maru No. 18 – Completed in February 2003, 1,279 tonnes, 56.1m long, nicknamed Princess Marine, the ferry is barrier-free
- Sakurajima-maru- Completed in February 2011, 1330 tons, 57.36m long, nicknamed Sakura Angel
- Sakurajima-maru No.2- completed March 2015, 1404 tons, 59 m long, nicknamed Sakura Fairy

== Gallery ==
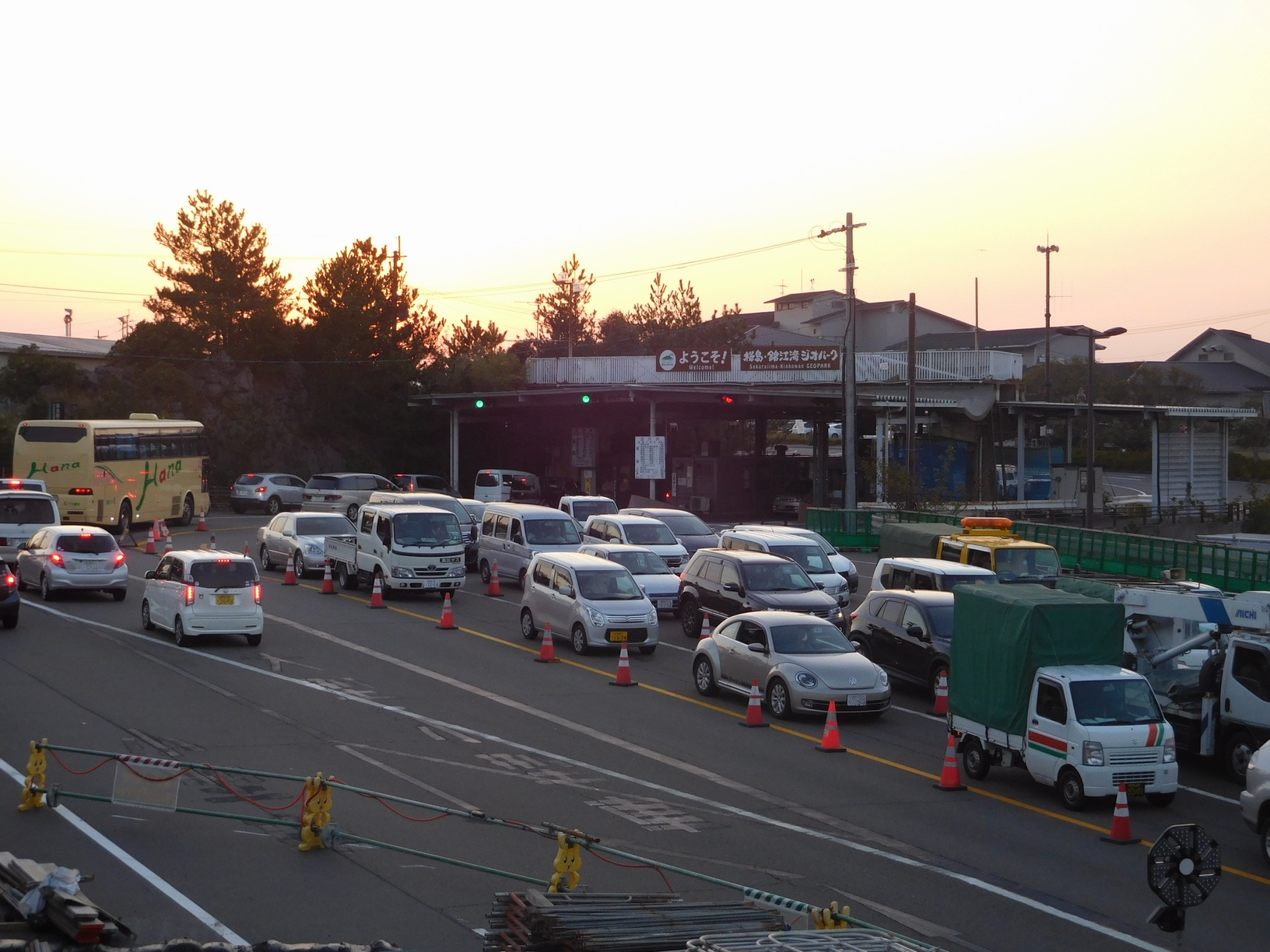
The Toll Gate of Sakurajima Ferry (November 5, 2016)

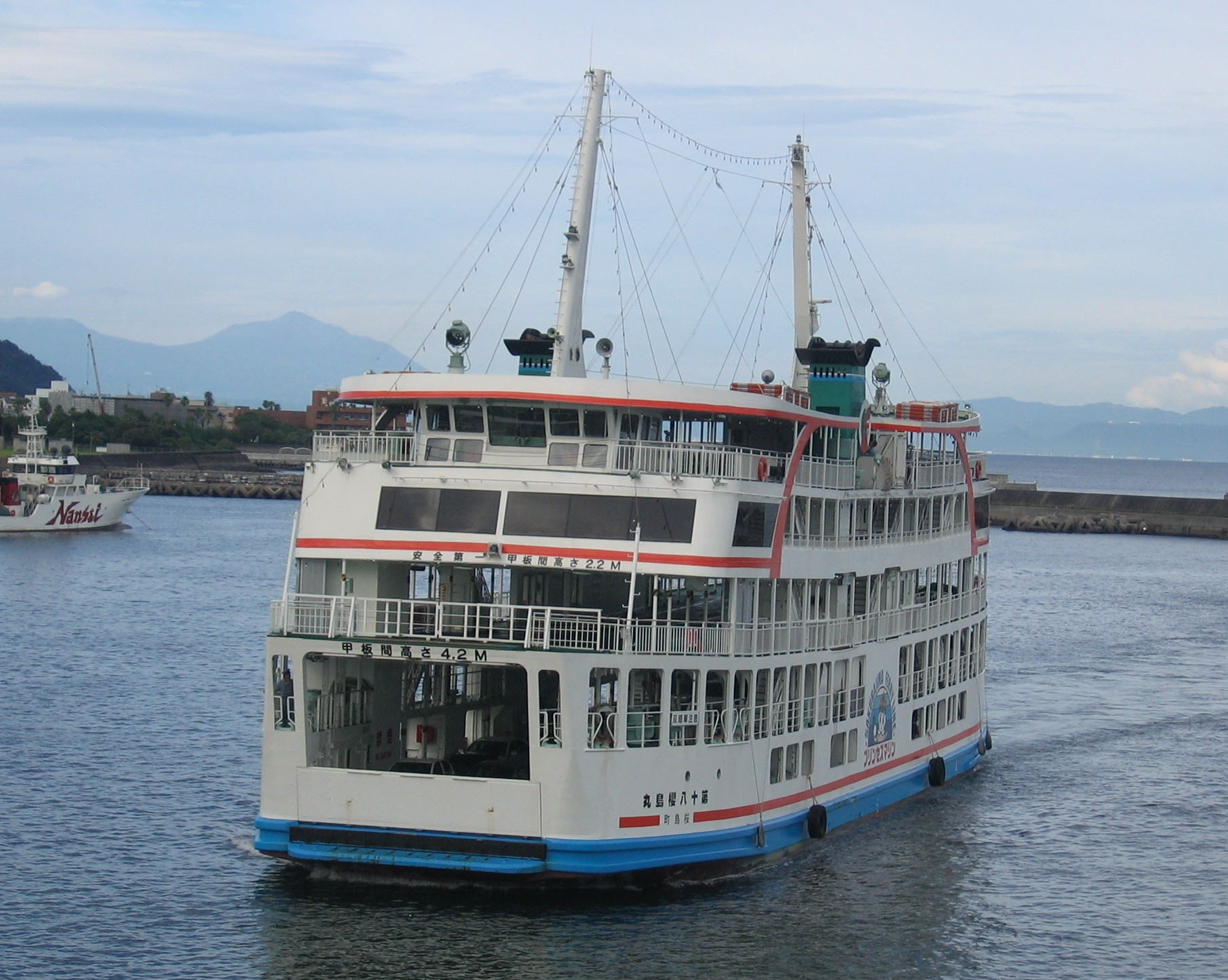
Sakurajima-maru No. 18 (July 9, 2004)

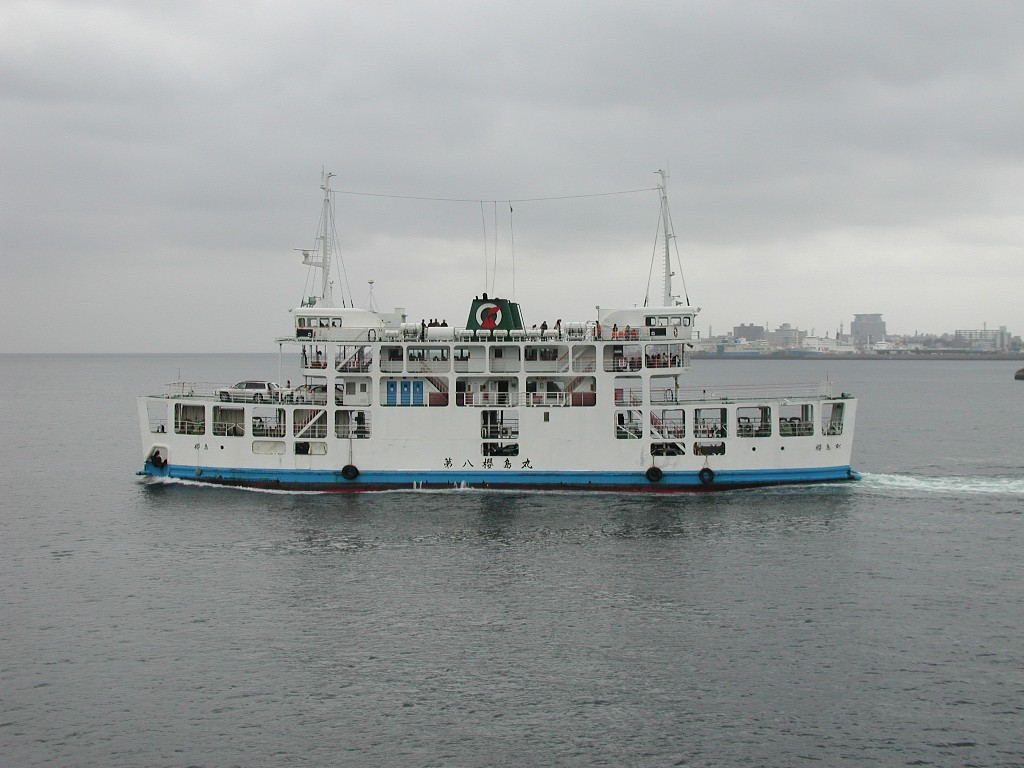
Sakurajima-maru No. 8 (March 22, 2002)

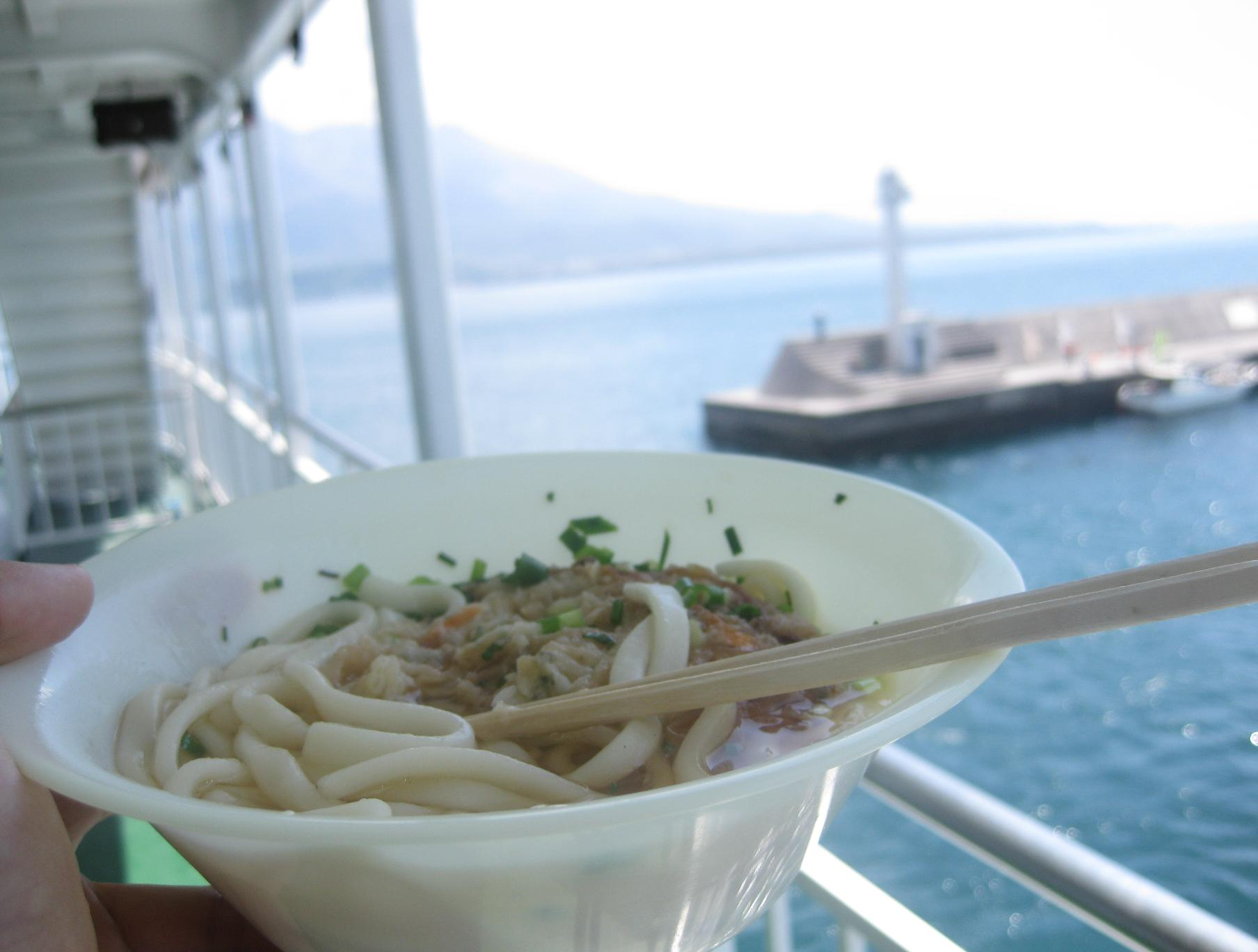
Udon of Yabukin and Mt. Sakurajima

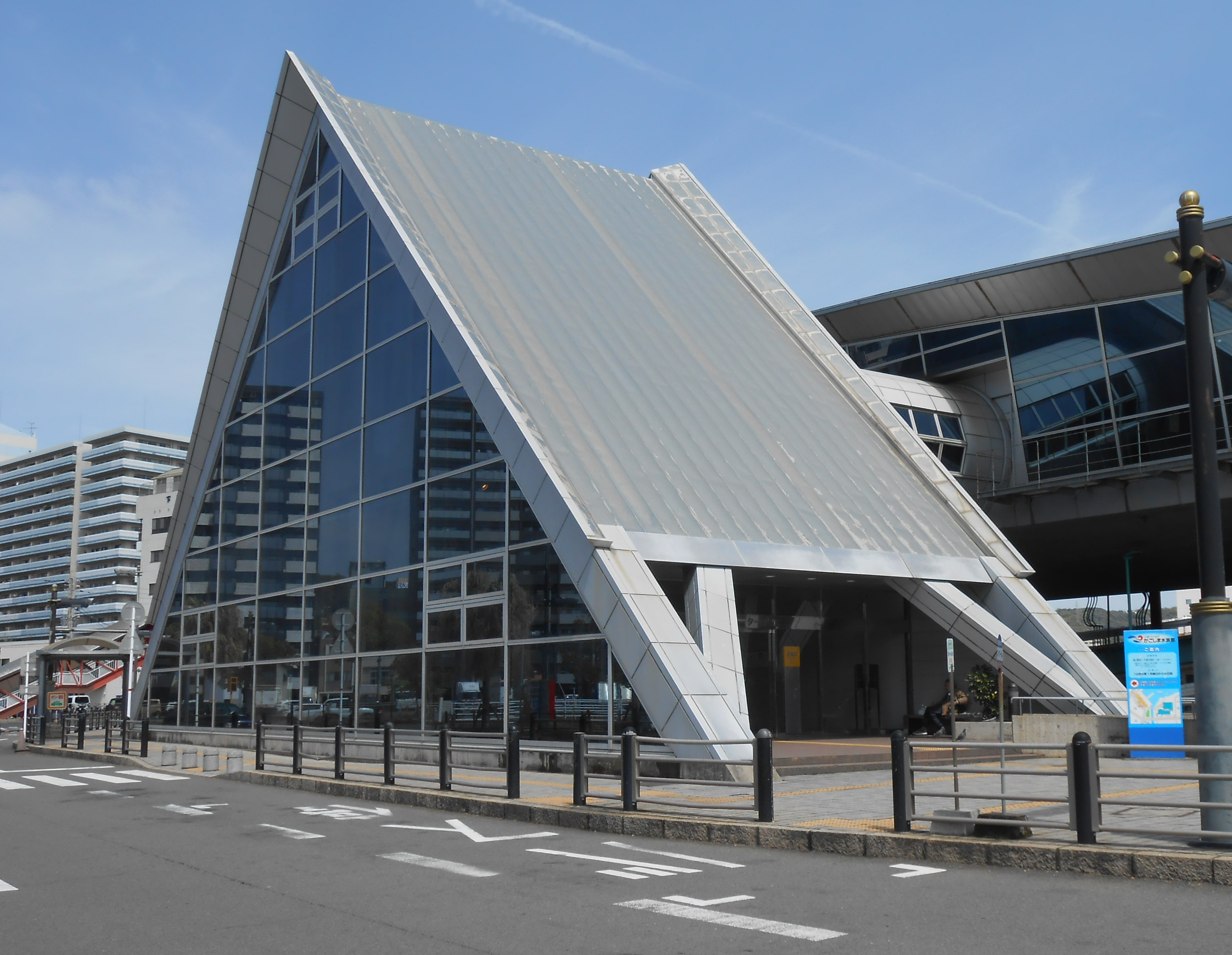
Kagoshima ferry terminal

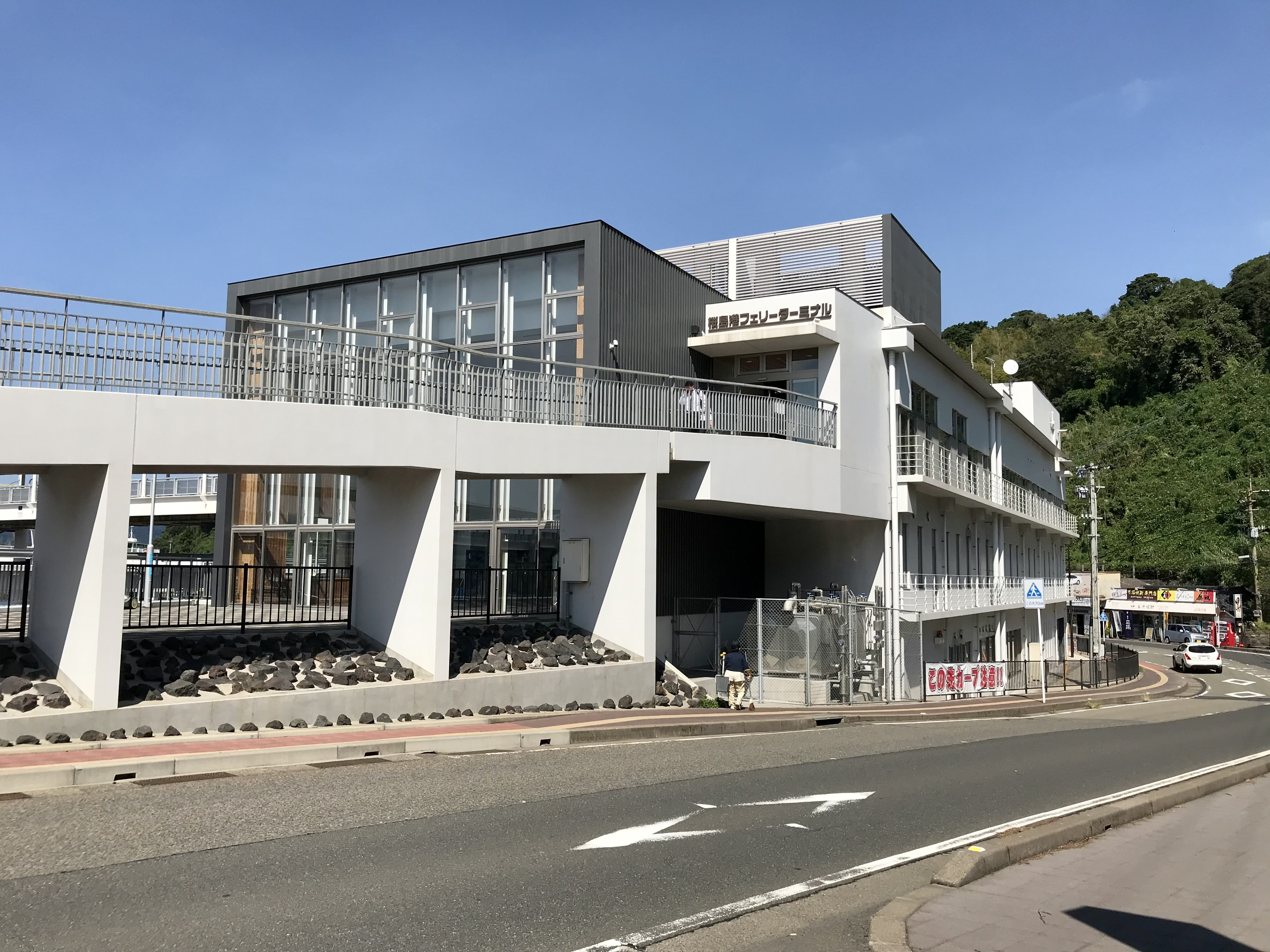
Sakurajima ferry terminal
