= Kagoshima ramen =

Japanese noodle dish

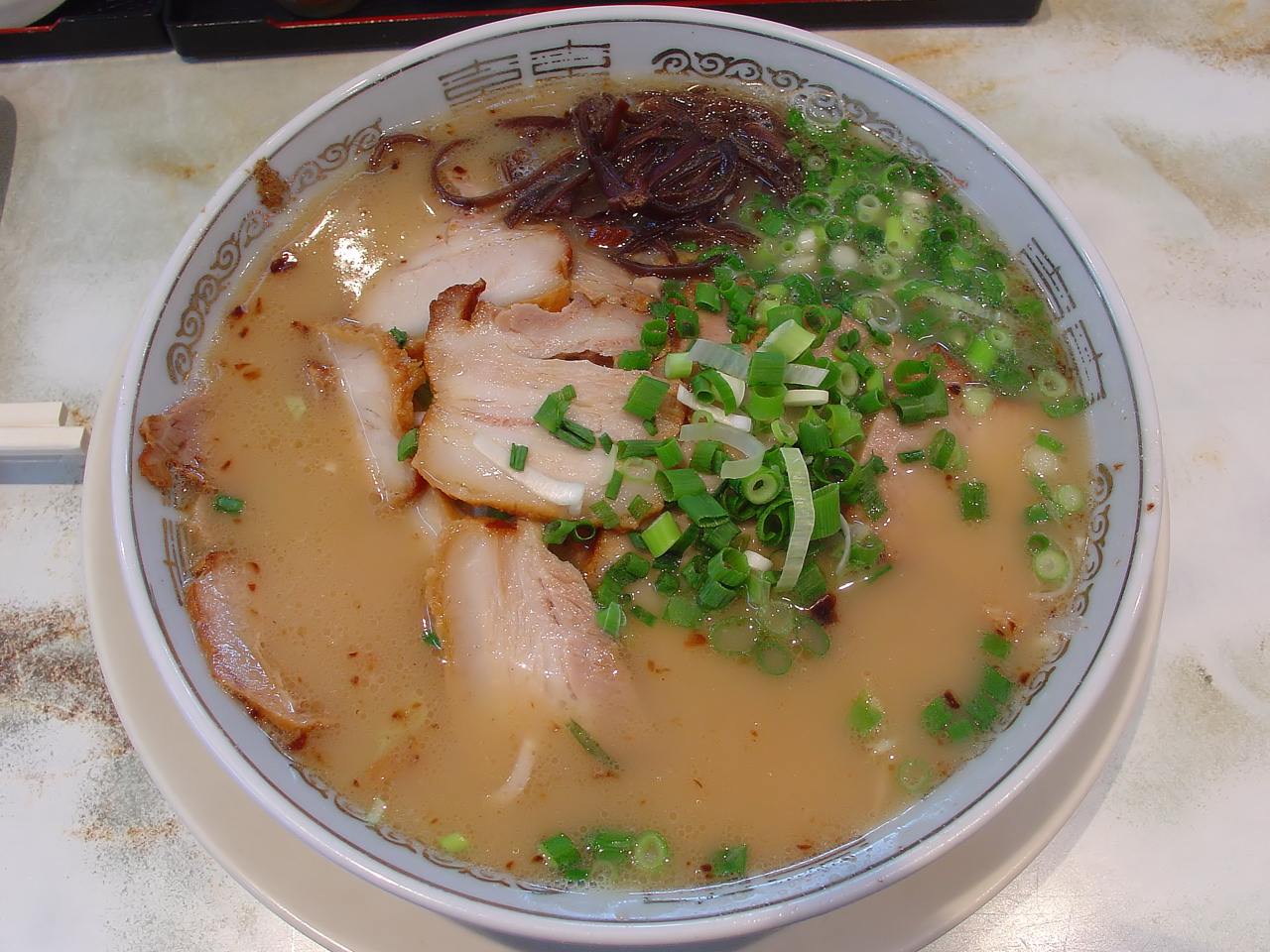
- Kagoshima ramen
- Type: Noodle soup
- Place of origin: Japan
- Region or state: Kagoshima
- Main ingredients: ramen, pork broth, chicken stock, vegetables, dried sardines, kelp, dried mushrooms

Kagoshima ramen (鹿児島ラーメン) is a ramen dish which is offered in Kagoshima Prefecture, in southern Japan.

== Main ingredients ==
Its soup is mainly based on tonkotsu (pork bone broth). It is a little cloudy, and chicken stock, vegetables, dried sardines, kelp and dried mushrooms are added. Kagoshima Ramen is the only ramen which is not influenced by Kurume ramen for geographical and historical reasons. The size of the noodle is a bit thicker than normal. Compared with other local varieties of ramen, the size of the noodle and the taste of the soup are very different; each shop has separate recipes. It is served with pickled daikon (senmai-zuke).

There are a lot of shops which have had miso ramen on the menu for a long time in Kagoshima. However, its taste is different from Sapporo ramen. It is called Kagoshima-style miso ramen. Kyushu ramen usually incorporates pale tonkotsu soup, although not exclusively. Some Kagoshima ramen use brown soup. Generally, Kagoshima ramen focuses on the harmony of every stock which makes the soup milder. The original shop for Kagoshima ramen, Noboruya, was opened in 1947. It is not nationally known, but popular locally.

== See also ==
- List of ramen dishes
