= Taisei Okazaki =

Japanese musician, DJ, and music producer

- Taisei Okazaki's performance in his studio

Background information
- Born: Taisei Okazaki; 23 March 1982 (age 44); Kagoshima, Japan
- Genres: Drum and bass, oldschool jungle, electronica, big beat, hip hop
- Occupations: DJ, producer
- Years active: 1994–present
- Label: Ere-phant Records

Taisei Okazaki (born 23 March 1982 in Kagoshima Prefecture) is a Japanese musician, DJ, and music producer who has produced music with Lord Kimo (the original member of Asian Dub Foundation) since 2009.

He has been ranked #46 in The Greatest DJs in Asia of All Time: Top 100 by Alex Trost and Vadim Kravetsky. He moved to the party Island "Koh Phangan" in Thailand from Tokyo Japan since 2012 and started a new career as an international artist, DJ and music producer.

== Discography ==
=== Mainly Release ===
- Mirai feat. XXX]
- Houon Kansha feat. George Willams
- Inori Original mix
- Inori feat. Lord Kimo
- Mumyo original mix

=== Mainly Live History ===
Live Acts in 2017

- Satsuma Festival（2009）with Lord Kimo Live at Lilac Hotels and Resort in Kagoshima, Japan
- Fullmoon party (2014) at Sunrise Bar in Koh Phangan, Thailand
- The Art of BASS (2015）at Chippendale Hotel in Sydney, Australia
- World Peace Day (2015) at Forsyth Barr Stadium in Dunedin, New Zealand
- Electro Shock Festival (2016) at Oba camp Village in Tokyo, Japan
- Soul Sessions - with Radha Cuadrado Live at 19East (2017) in Manila, Philippines
- Fullmoon party (2017) in Koh Phangan, Thailand
- RAT PPL + Moonroom present: Across the Sea Feat. Taisei Okazaki (2018) at Coaxial Art in Los Angeles, United States
