= Ichiki =

Ichiki (written: 一木 or 市来) is a Japanese surname. Notable people with the surname include:

- Kiyonao Ichiki (一木 清直) (1892–1942), Japanese general
- Ichiki Kitokuro (一木 喜徳郎) (1867–1944), Japanese politician
- Mitsuhiro Ichiki (市来 光弘) (born 1982), Japanese voice actor
- Otohiko Ichiki (市来 乙彦) (1872–1954), Japanese businessman and banker
- Ichiki Shirō (市来 四郎) (1828–1903), Japanese photographer

== See also ==
- Hisako Ichiki (Armor), a hero in the X-Men comics
- Ichiki, Kagoshima (市来町, Ichiki-chō), former town in Hioki District, Kagoshima Prefecture, Japan
- Ichiki Station (市来駅, Ichiki-eki), train station in Ichikikushikino, Kagoshima Prefecture, Japan
