= Sendai Station =

Location of Sendai Station in Japan

Sendai Station is the name of two train stations in Japan:

- Sendai Station (Miyagi) (仙台駅) in Miyagi Prefecture
- Sendai Station (Kagoshima) (川内駅) in Kagoshima Prefecture
