= Kobanchaya Station =

Railway station in Satsumasendai, Kagoshima Prefecture, Japan

Kobanchaya Station 木場茶屋駅
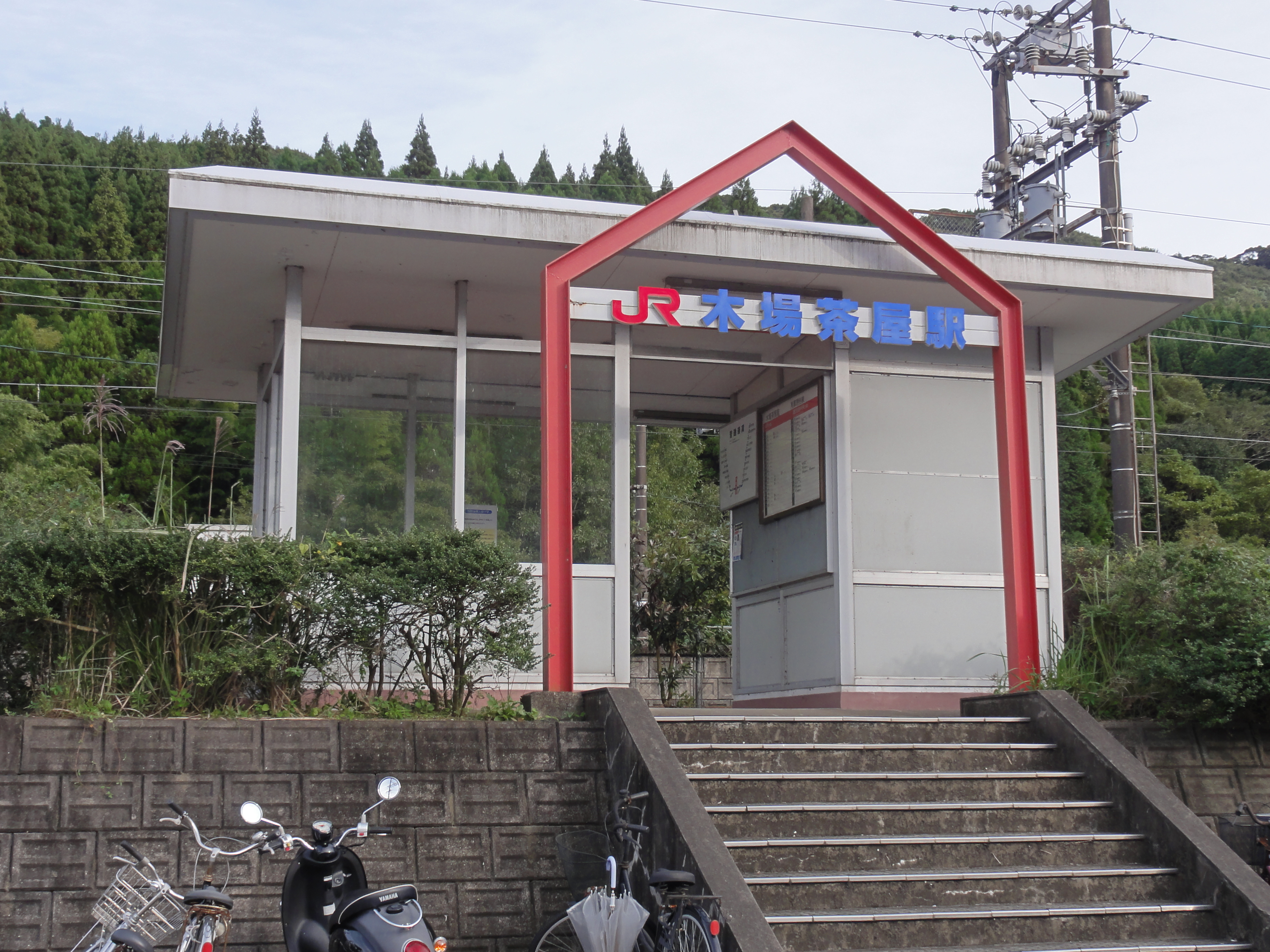
- Kobanchaya Station

General information
- Location: 8267 Kobanchaya-cho, Satsumasendai-shi, Kagoshima-ken 895-0034; Japan
- Coordinates: 31°45′55.11″N 130°18′28.30″E
- Operator: JR Kyushu
- Line: ■ Kagoshima Main Line
- Distance: 354.9 km from Mojikō
- Platforms: 1 island platform

Other information
- Status: Unstaffed
- Website: Official website

History
- Opened: 10 June 1914

Passengers
- FY2015: 33 daily

Services
Preceding station	JR Kyushu	Following station
Kushikino towards Kagoshima	Kagoshima Main Line	Kumanojō towards Mojikō
Location
- Location within Kagoshima Prefecture Location within Japan

Kobanchaya Station (木場茶屋駅, Kobanchaya-eki) is a passenger railway station located in the city of Satsumasendai, Kagoshima Prefecture, Japan. It is operated by JR Kyushu.

== Lines ==
The station is served by the Kagoshima Main Line and is located 354.9 km from the starting point of the line at Mojikō.

=== Layout ===
The station is an above-ground station with one island platform and two tracks. Although it is an unattended station, there is a small station building and the platform is connected to the station by a footbridge.

=== Platforms ===
1	■ ■ Kagoshima Main Line	for Sendai
2	■ ■ Kagoshima Main Line	for Kushimoto and Kagoshima-Chūō

== History ==
The station was opened by Japanese Government Railways (JGR) on 1 June 1914. With the privatization of Japanese National Railways (JNR), the successor of JGR, on 1 April 1987, JR Kyushu took over control of the station.

== See also ==
- List of railway stations in Japan
