= Shirasawa Station =

Shirasawa Station is the name of multiple train stations in Japan.

- Rikuzen-Shirasawa Station - (陸前白沢駅) in Miyagi Prefecture
- Shirasawa Station (Aichi) - (白沢駅) in Aichi Prefecture
- Shirasawa Station (Akita) - (白沢駅) in Akita Prefecture
- Shirasawa Station (Kagoshima) - (白沢駅) in Kagoshima Prefecture
- Shirasawakeikoku Station - (白沢渓谷駅) in Aichi Prefecture
