= Kumanojō Station =

Railway station in Satsumasendai, Kagoshima Prefecture, Japan

Kumanojō Station 隈之城駅
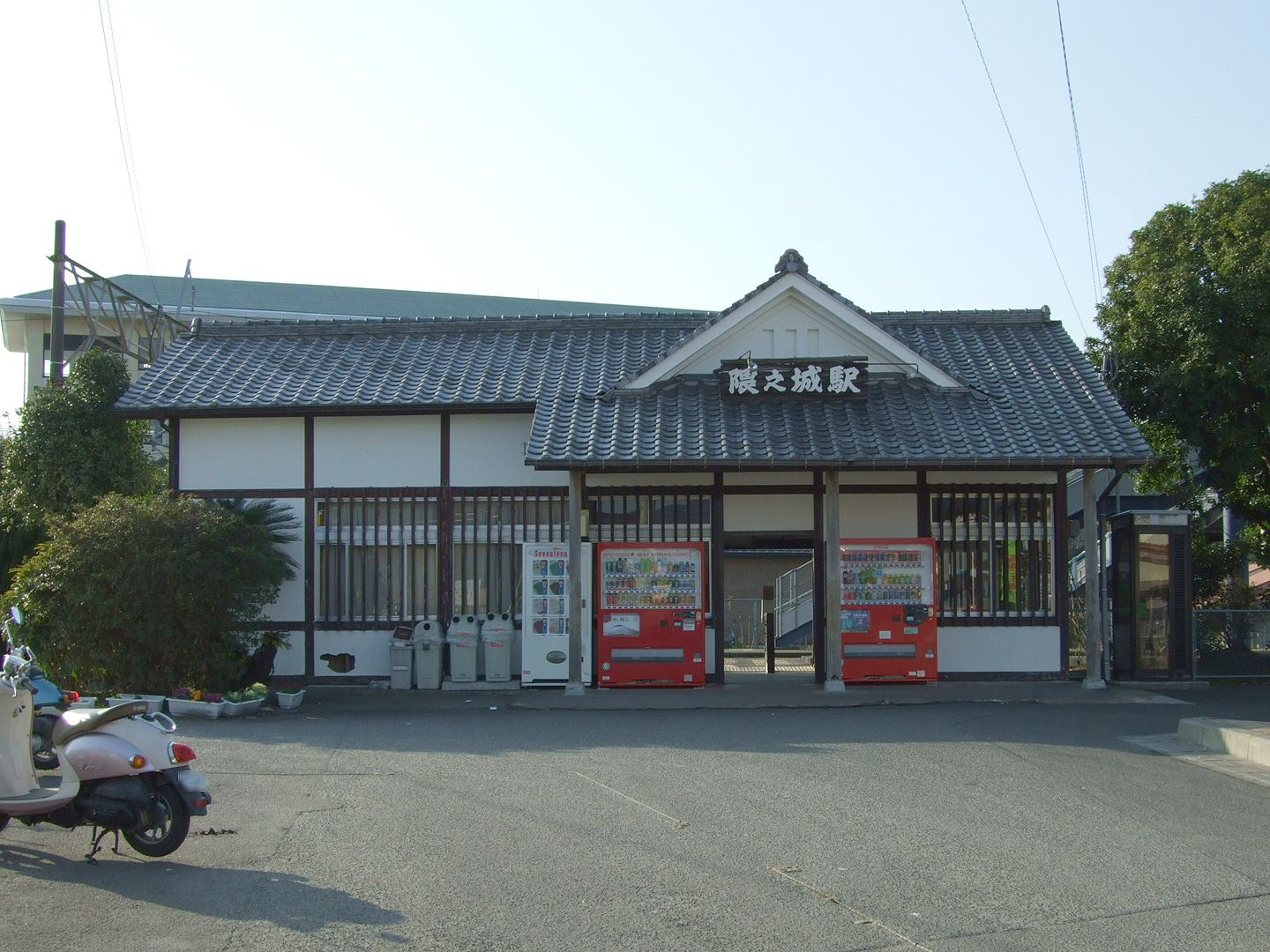
- Kumanojō Station

General information
- Location: Kumanojocho, Satsumasendai-shi, Kagoshima-ken 895-0041; Japan
- Coordinates: 31°47′32.63″N 130°18′25.69″E
- Operator: JR Kyushu
- Line: ■ Kagoshima Main Line
- Distance: 351.8 km from Mojikō
- Platforms: 2 side platforms

Other information
- Website: Official website

History
- Opened: 1 June 1914

Passengers
- FY2020: 349 daily
- Rank: 254th (among JR Kyushu stations)

Services
Preceding station	JR Kyushu	Following station
Kobanchaya towards Kagoshima	Kagoshima Main Line	Sendai towards Mojikō
Location
- Location within Kagoshima Prefecture Location within Japan

Kumanojō Station (隈之城駅, Kumanojō-eki) is a passenger railway station located in the city of Satsumasendai, Kagoshima Prefecture, Japan. It is operated by JR Kyushu.

== Lines ==
The station is served by the Kagoshima Main Line and is located 351.8 km from the starting point of the line at Mojikō.

== Layout ==
The station is an above-ground station with two side platforms and two tracks. It has a small station building modeled after a castle and a footbridge.

=== Platforms ===
1	■ ■ Kagoshima Main Line	for Kagoshima-Chūō for Sendai
2	■ ■ Kagoshima Main Line	for Sendai

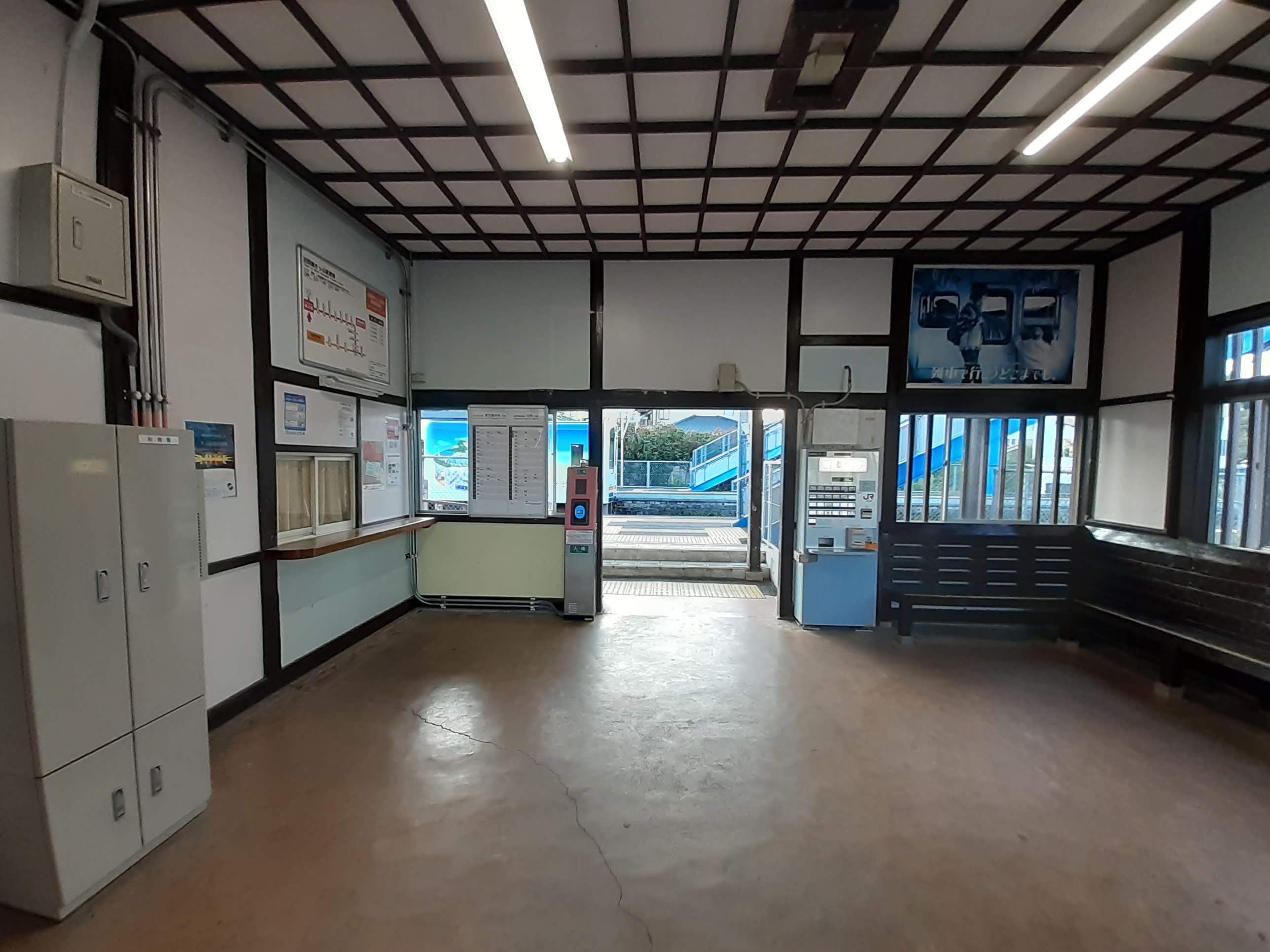
Waiting Room

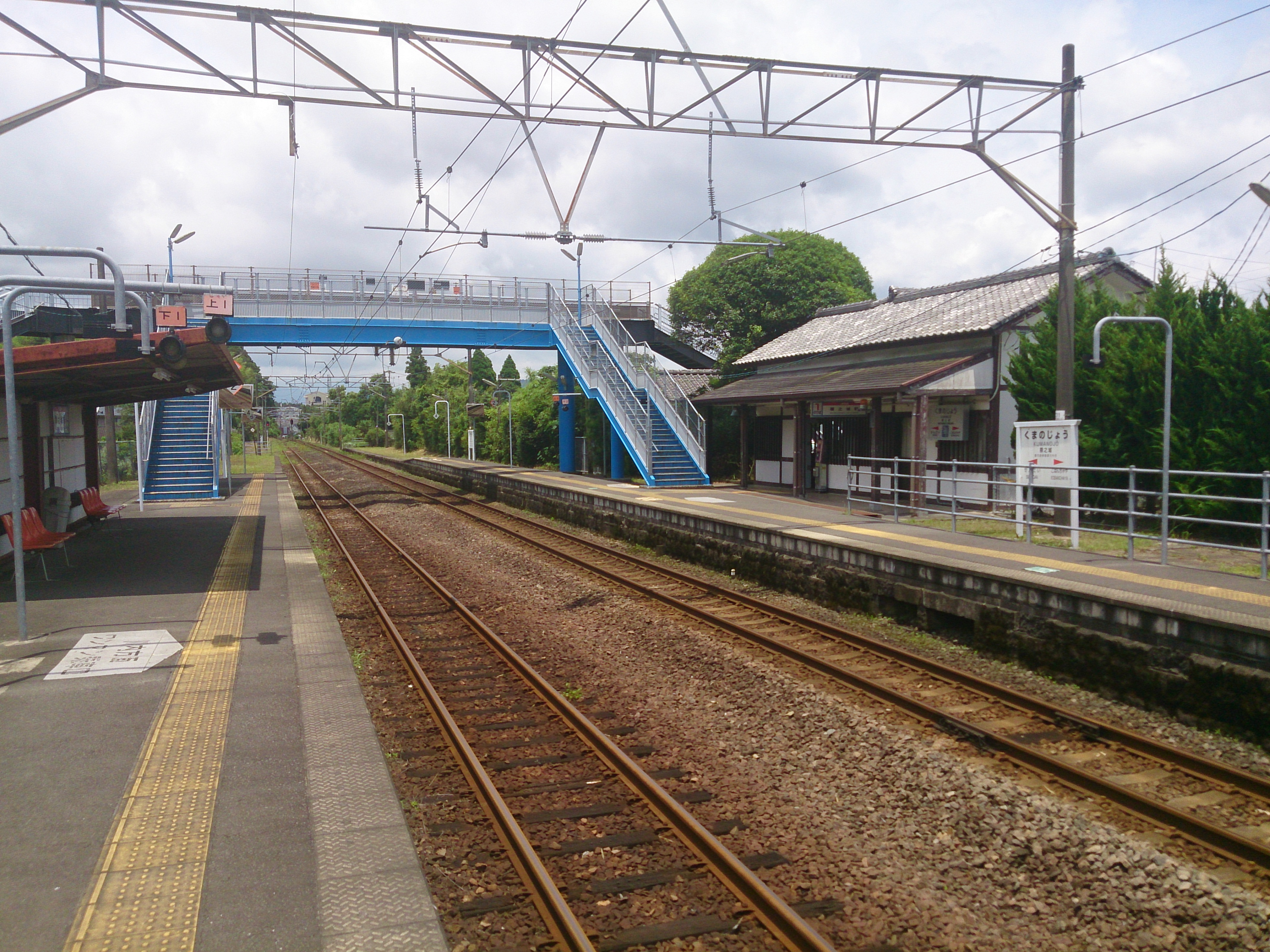
Platform

== History ==
The station was opened by Japanese Government Railways (JGR) on 1 June 1914. With the privatization of Japanese National Railways (JNR), the successor of JGR, on 1 April 1987, JR Kyushu took over control of the station.

== Passenger statistics ==
In fiscal 2020, the station was used by an average of 349 passengers daily (boarding passengers only), and it ranked 254th among the busiest stations of JR Kyushu.

== Surrounding area ==
- Reimei Junior and Senior High School

== See also ==
- List of railway stations in Japan
