= Satsuma-Itashiki Station =

Railway station in Makurazaki, Kagoshima Prefecture, Japan

Satsuma-Itashiki Station 薩摩板敷駅
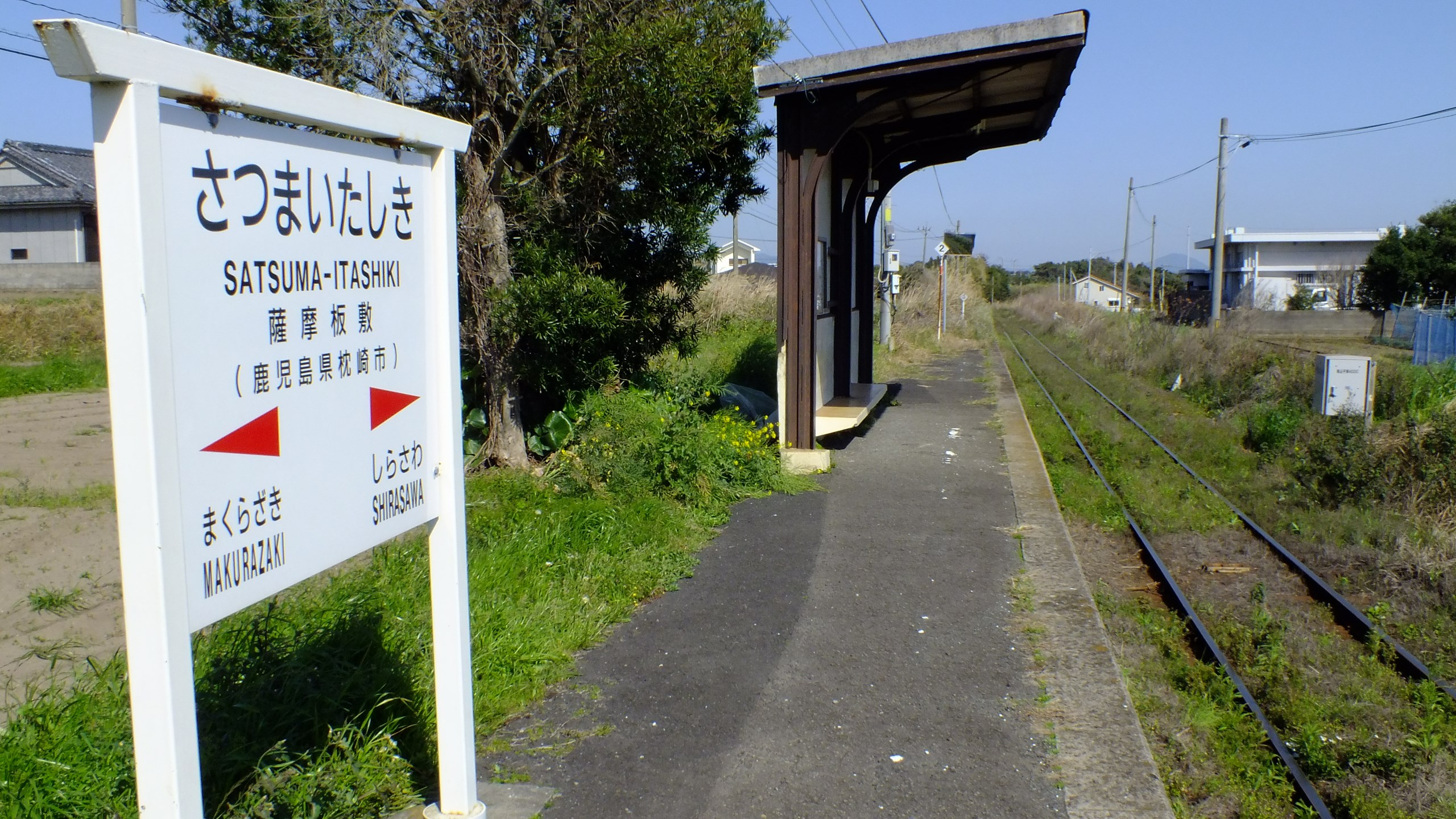
- Satsuma-Itashiki Station in 2019

General information
- Location: Shirasawa Nishimachi, Makurazaki-shi, Kagoshima-ken 898-0092; Japan
- Coordinates: 31°15′44.37″N 130°19′51.59″E
- Operator: JR Kyushu
- Line: ■ Ibusuki Makurazaki Line
- Distance: 84.4 km from Kagoshima-Chūō
- Platforms: 1 side platform

Other information
- Status: Unstaffed
- Website: Official website

History
- Opened: 31 October 1963

Passengers
- FY2015: 50 daily

Services
Preceding station	JR Kyushu	Following station
Shirasawa towards Kagoshima-Chūō	Ibusuki Makurazaki Line	Makurazaki Terminus
Location
- Location within Kagoshima Prefecture Location within Japan

Satsuma-Itashiki Station (薩摩板敷駅, Satsuma-Itashiki-eki) is a passenger railway station located in the city of Makurazaki, Kagoshima Prefecture, Japan. It is operated by JR Kyushu.

== Lines ==
The station is served by the Ibusuki Makurazaki Line and is located 84.4 km from the starting point of the line at Kagoshima-Chūō.

== Layout ==
This is an above-ground station with one side platform and one track. It is an unattended station. There is no station building.

== History ==
The station was opened on 31 October 1963 as a station on the JNR Ibusuki Line, when the line was extended from Saijo Station to Makurazaki Station to become the Ibusuki Makurazaki Line. On this day, Ishigaki Station, Suisegawa Station, Sagaokawa Station, Matsugaura Station, Satsuma Shioya Station, Goryō Station, Shirasawa Station, and Makurazaki Station were also opened. With the privatization of Japanese National Railways (JNR), the successor of JGR, on 1 April 1987, JR Kyushu took over control of the station.

== Passenger statistics ==
In fiscal 2015, the station was used by an average of 50 passengers daily.

== Surrounding area ==
- Japan National Route 226
- Kagoshima Prefectural Kagoshima Fisheries High School

== See also ==
- List of railway stations in Japan
