= Kushikino, Kagoshima =

Defunct Japanese municipality

Kushikino (串木野市, Kushikino-shi) is the name of a former city municipality located in Kagoshima Prefecture, Japan. It was founded under that name on 1 October 1950.

In 2003, Kushikino had an estimated 26,355 inhabitants and covered an area 80.46 km^{2}, giving a population density of 327.55 persons per km^{2}.

On 11 October 2005, Kushikino and the town of Ichiki (part of Hioki District) were merged to form the new city of Ichikikushikino, so that Kushikino no longer exists as an independent municipality.
