= Kushikino Station =

Railway station in Ichikikushikino, Kagoshima Prefecture, Japan

Kushikino Station 串木野駅
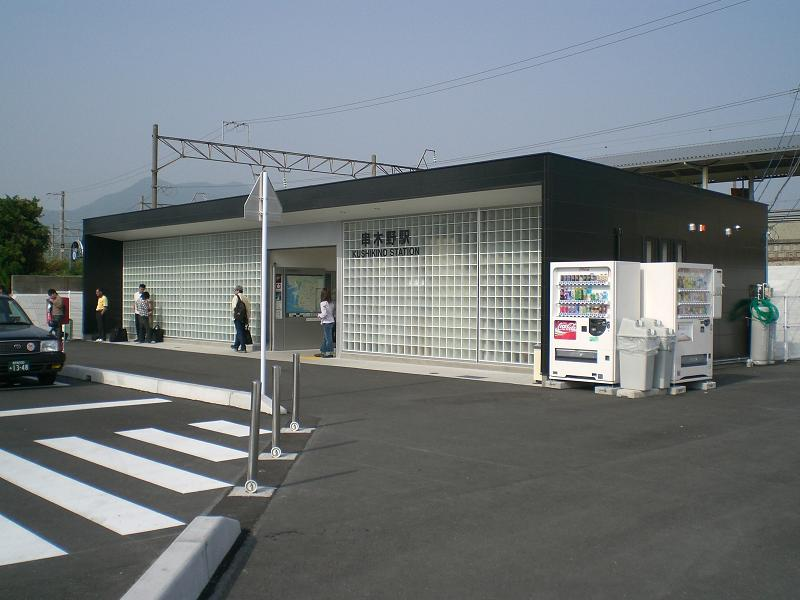
- Kushikino Station

General information
- Location: 11760 Akebonocho, Ichikikushikino-shi, Kagoshima-ken, 896-0001; Japan
- Coordinates: 31°43′16.6″N 130°16′27″E
- Operator: JR Kyushu
- Line: ■ Kagoshima Main Line
- Distance: 361.2 km from Mojikō
- Platforms: 1 island platform

Other information
- Status: Unstaffed
- Website: Official website

History
- Opened: 15 December 1914

Passengers
- FY2020: 666 daily

Services
Preceding station	JR Kyushu	Following station
Kamimuragakuenmae towards Kagoshima	Kagoshima Main Line	Kobanchaya towards Mojikō
Location
- Location within Kagoshima Prefecture Location within Japan

Kushikino Station (串木野駅, Kushikino-eki) is a passenger railway station located in the city of Ichikikushikino, Kagoshima Prefecture, Japan. It is operated by JR Kyushu.

== Lines ==
The station is served by the Kagoshima Main Line and is located 361.2 km from the starting point of the line at Mojikō.

=== Layout ===
The station is an above-ground station with one island platform and two tracks. The platform is located higher than the station building, and the two are connected by an underground passage. The original wooden station building, which was completed in 1913, was demolished in December 2006 due to deterioration, and after operating in a temporary prefabricated building, a new station building opened on March 18, 2007. The station building has a black base color scheme. The station is unattended.

=== Platforms ===
1	■ ■ Kagoshima Main Line	for Sendai
2	■ ■ Kagoshima Main Line	for Ijuin and Kagoshima-Chūō

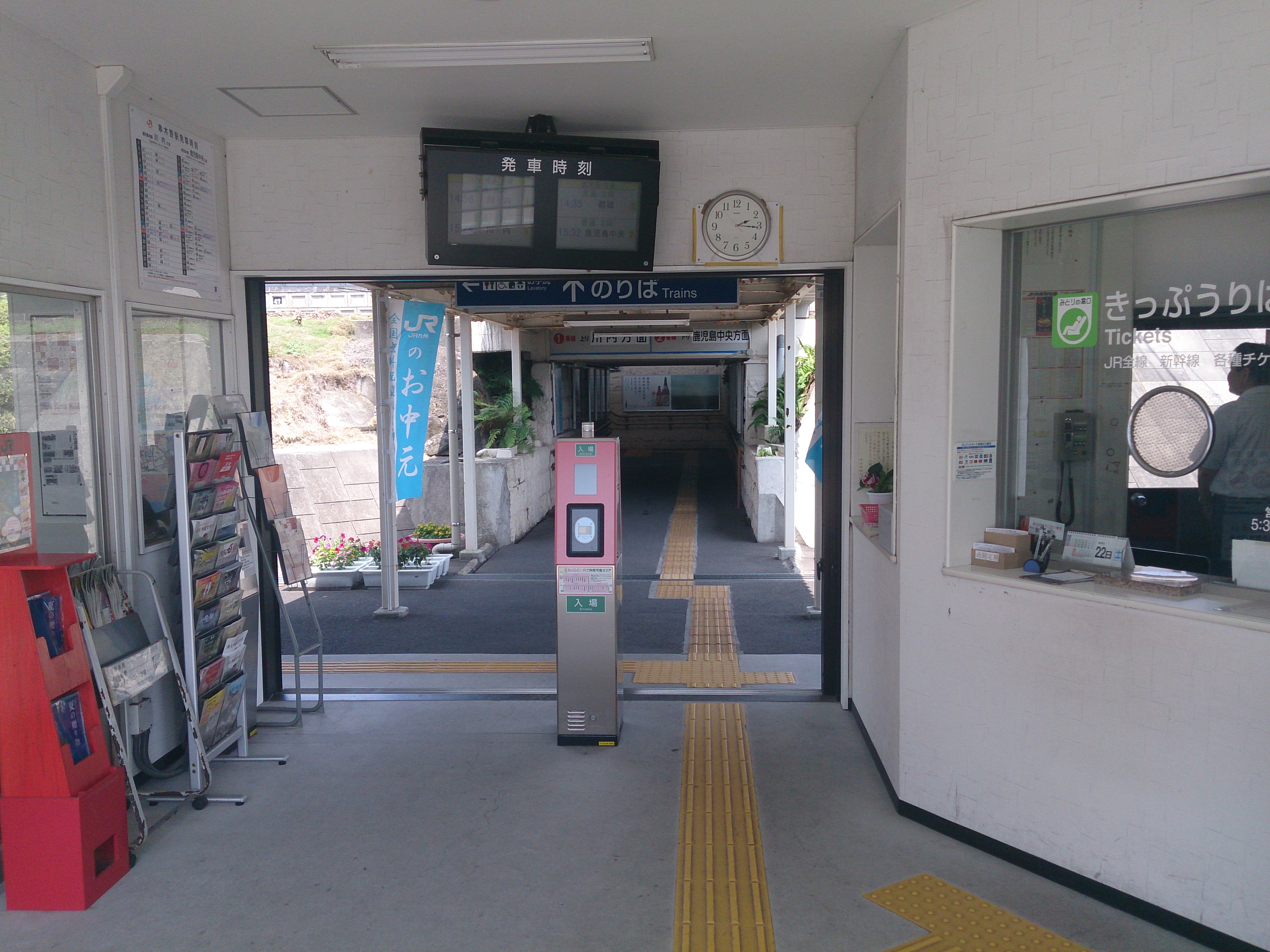
Inside the station building

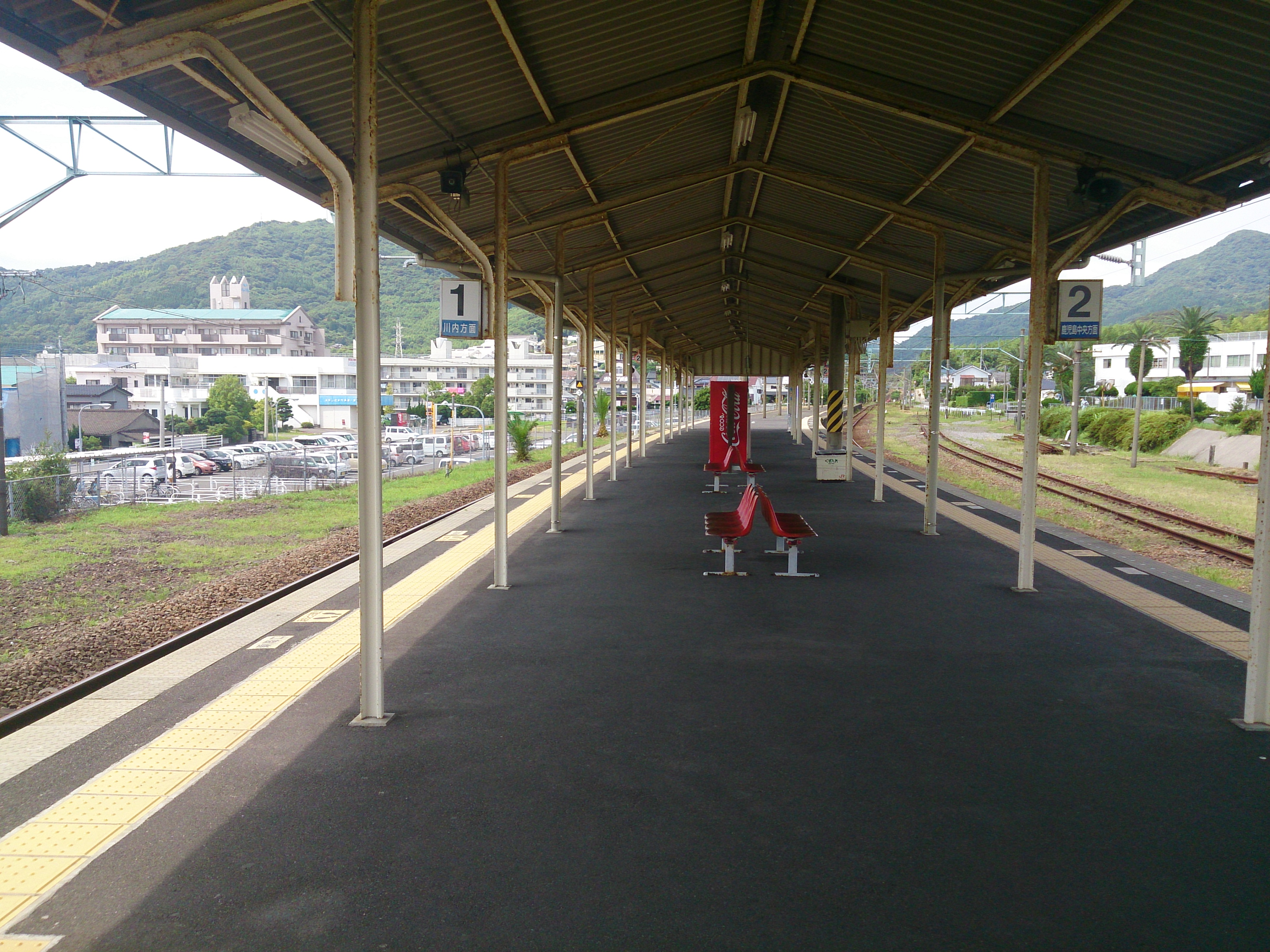
Platform

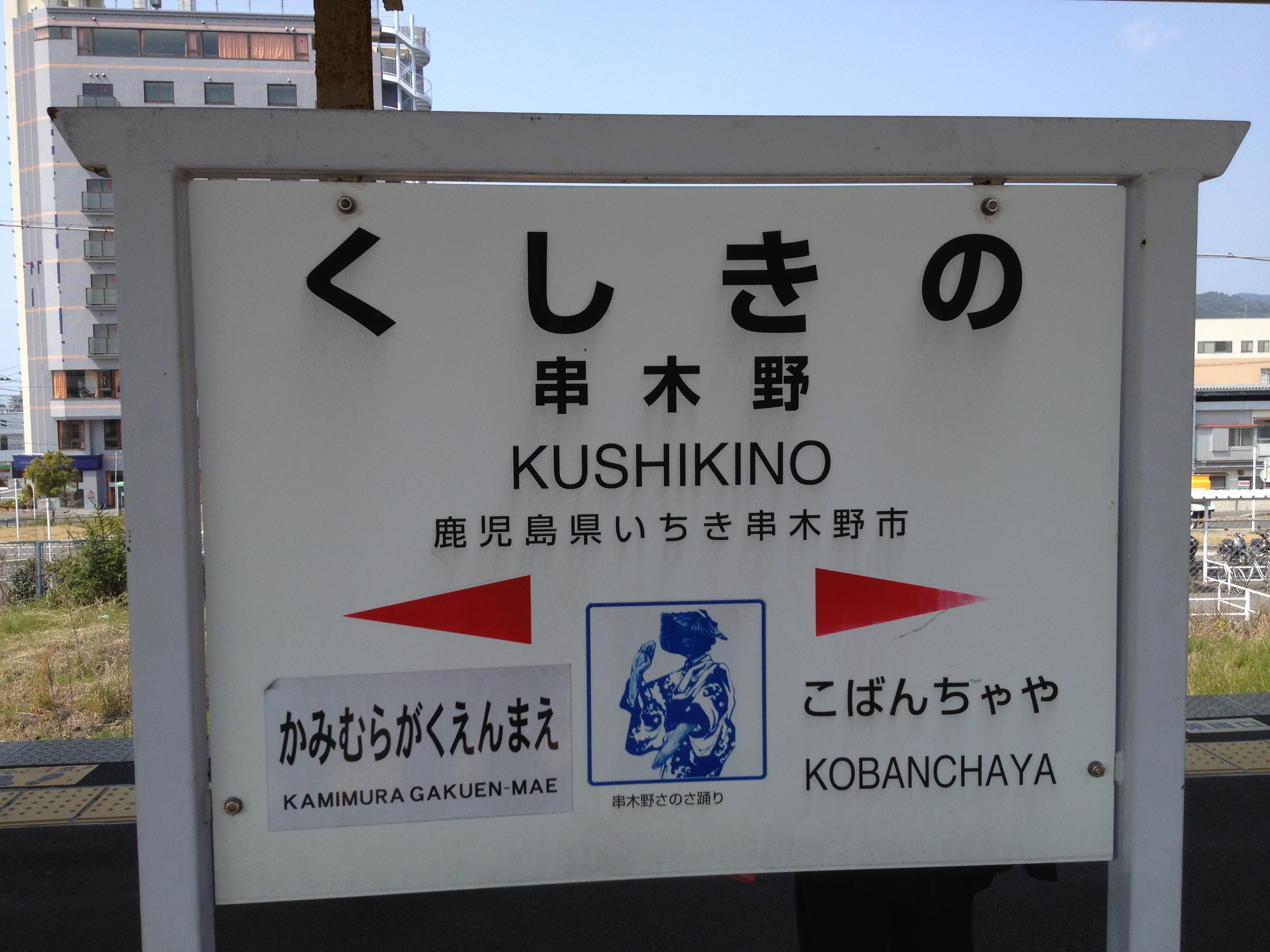
Station sign

== History ==
The station was opened by Japanese Government Railways (JGR) on 15 December 1913. With the privatization of Japanese National Railways (JNR), the successor of JGR, on 1 April 1987, JR Kyushu took over control of the station.

== Passenger statistics ==
In fiscal 2020, the station was used by an average of 666 passengers daily (boarding passengers only), and it ranked 186th among the busiest stations of JR Kyushu.

== Surrounding area ==
- Ichikikushikino City Hall (former Kushikino City Hall)
- Ichikikushikino Municipal Kushikino Elementary School
- Ichikikushikino Municipal Kushikino Junior High School

== See also ==
- List of railway stations in Japan
