= Japan National Route 270 =

Road in Kagoshima prefecture, Japan

National Route 270
- 国道270号
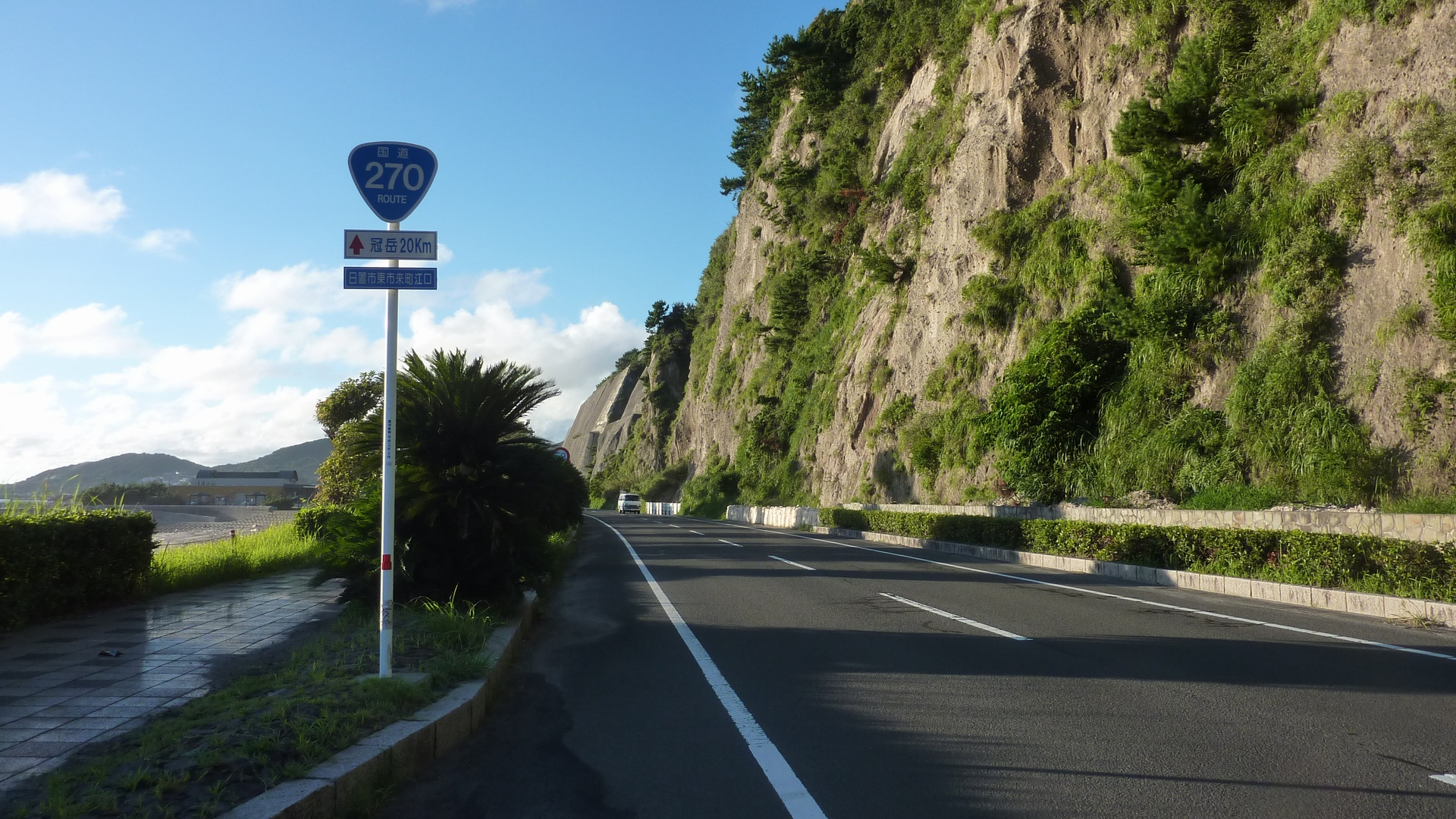

Route information
- Length: 52.4 km (32.6 mi)
- Existed: 1963–present

Major junctions
- North end: National Route 3 in Ichikikushikino, Kagoshima
- South end: National Route 225 / National Route 226 in Makurazaki, Kagoshima

Location
- Country: Japan

Highway system
- National highways of Japan; Expressways of Japan
| ← National Route 269 | → National Route 271 |

National Route 270 is a national highway of Japan connecting Makurazaki and Ichikikushikino in Kagoshima prefecture, Japan, with a total length of 52.4 km (32.56 mi).
