= Kamimuragakuenmae Station =

Railway station in Ichikikushikino, Kagoshima Prefecture, Japan

Kamimuragakuenmae Station 神村学園前駅
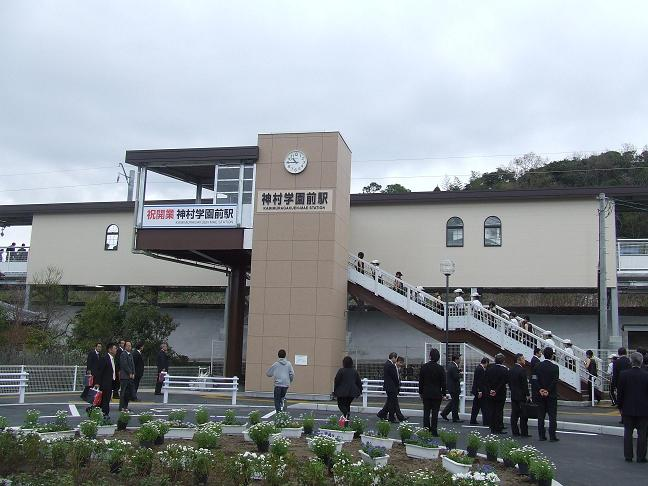
- Kamimuragakuenmae Station

General information
- Location: 4251 Beppu, Ichikikushikino-shi, Kagoshima-ken 896-0037; Japan
- Coordinates: 31°42′13.5″N 130°17′2.86″E
- Operator: JR Kyushu
- Line: ■ Kagoshima Main Line
- Distance: 363.4 km from Mojikō
- Platforms: 1 side platform

Other information
- Status: Unstaffed
- Website: Official website

History
- Opened: 13 March 2010

Passengers
- FY2020: 877 daily

Services
Preceding station	JR Kyushu	Following station
Ichiki towards Kagoshima	Kagoshima Main Line	Kushikino towards Mojikō
Location
- Location within Kagoshima Prefecture Location within Japan

Kamimuragakuenmae Station (神村学園前駅, Kamimuragakuen-mae-eki) is a passenger railway station located in the city of Ichikikushikino, Kagoshima Prefecture, Japan. It is operated by JR Kyushu.

== Lines ==
The station is served by the Kagoshima Main Line and is located 363.4 km from the starting point of the line at Mojikō.

=== Layout ===
The station consists of one side platform on an embankment, connected to the station building by an elevator. The station is unattended.

== History ==
The station was opened on 13 March 2010.

== Passenger statistics ==
In fiscal 2020, the station was used by an average of 877 passengers daily (boarding passengers only), and it ranked 153rd among the busiest stations of JR Kyushu.

== Surrounding area ==
- Kamimura Gakuen Elementary & Junior & Senior High School
- Japan National Route 3
- Ichikikushikino City Terushima Elementary School
- Kagoshima Prefectural Kushikino Special Needs School

== See also ==
- List of railway stations in Japan
