= Makurazaki =

Makurazaki 枕崎市
- City
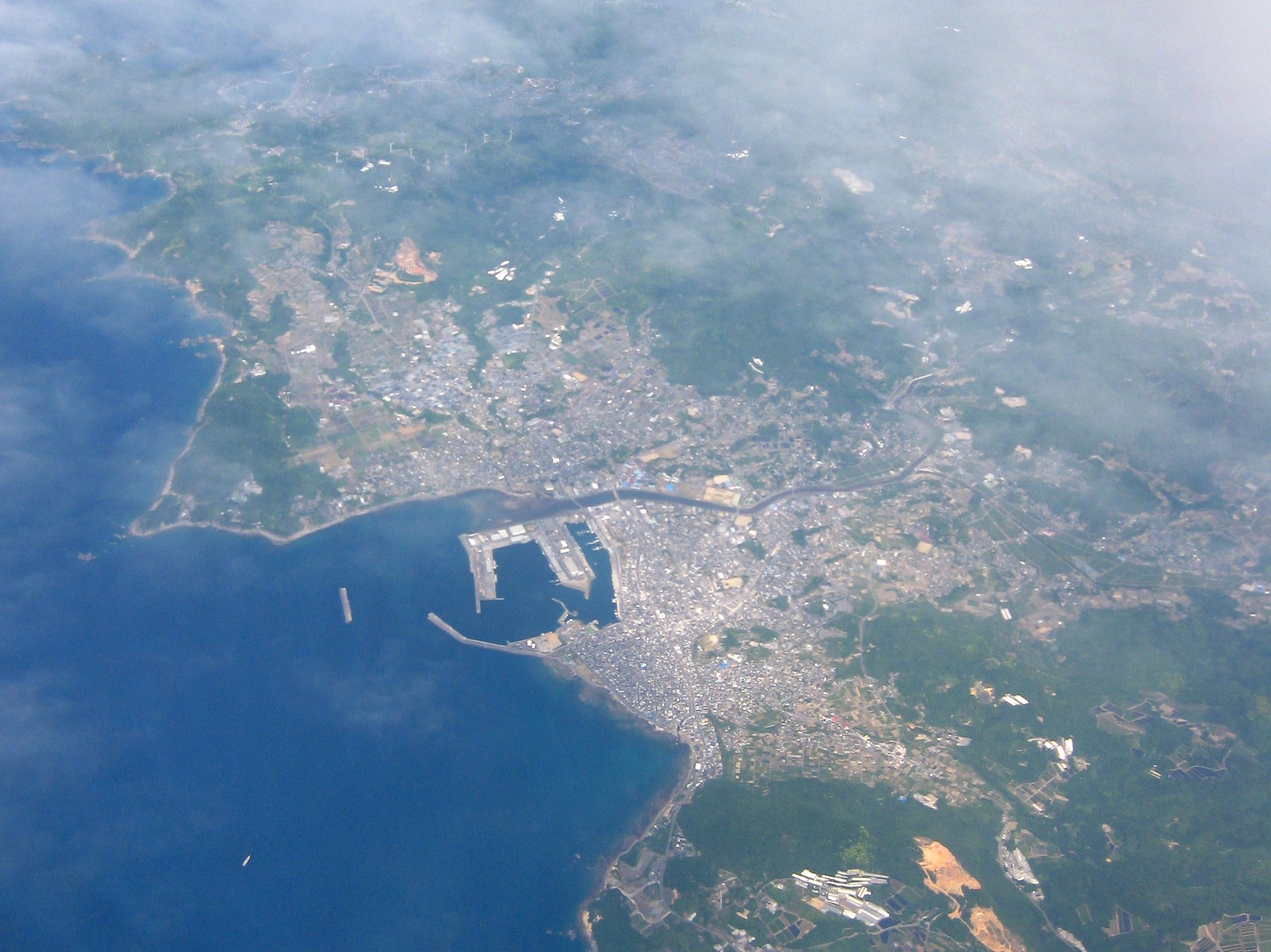
- View of Makurazaki

- Flag Chapter
- Interactive map of Makurazaki
- Location in Japan
- Coordinates: 31°16′23″N 130°17′49″E
- Country: Japan
- Region: Kyushu
- Prefecture: Kagoshima

Government
  - Mayor: Norishige Maeda (form 2018)

Area
  - Total: 74.78 km^{2} (28.87 sq mi)

Population (July 1, 2024)
  - Total: 19,006
  - Density: 254.2/km^{2} (658.3/sq mi)
- Time zone: UTC+09:00 (JST)
- City hall address: 27, Chiyodachō, Makurazaki-shi, Kagoshima-ken 898-8501
- Climate: Cfa
- Website: Official website
- Symbols
- Flower: Chrysanthemum
- Tree: Camellia

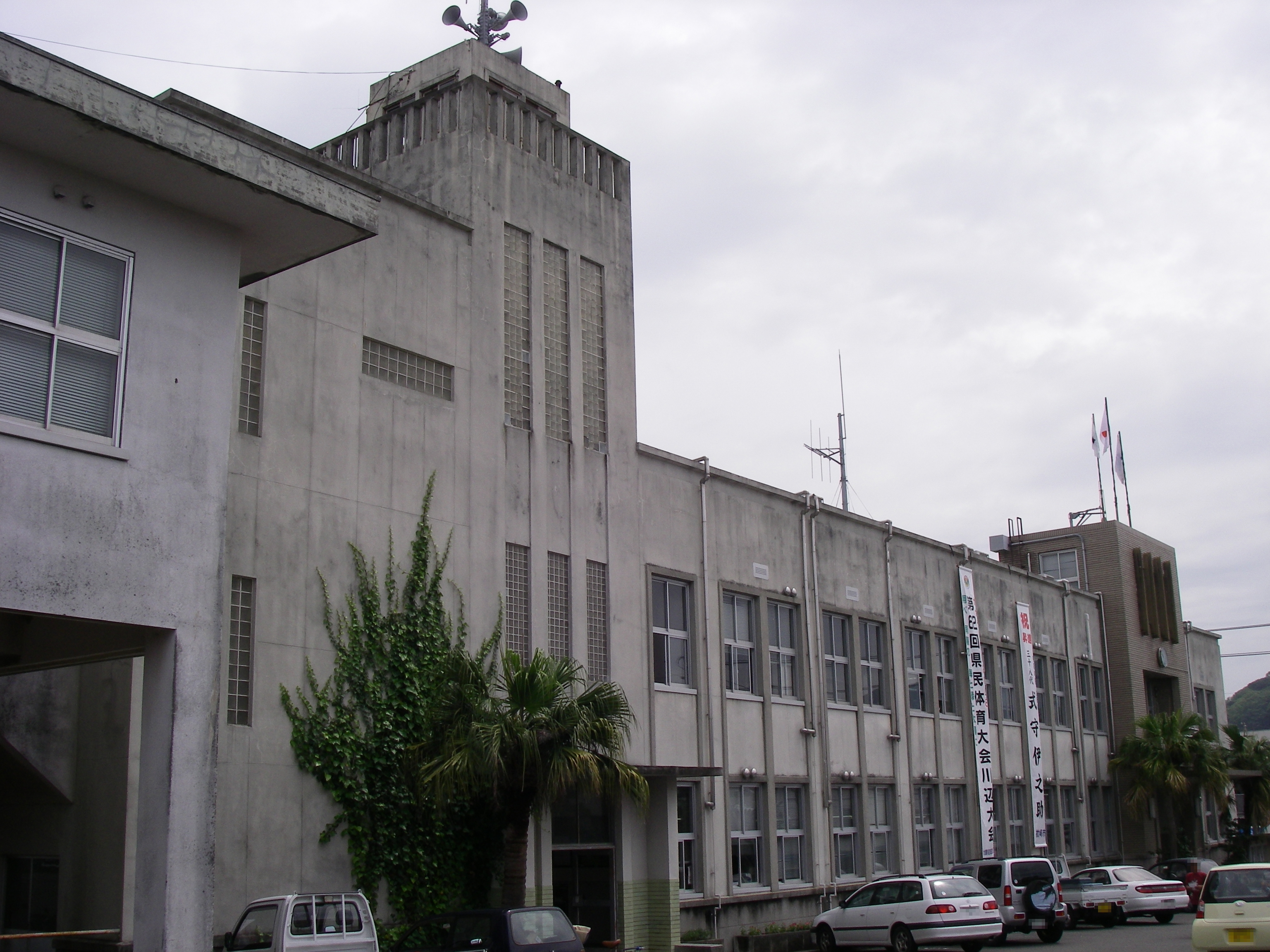
Makurazaki City Hall

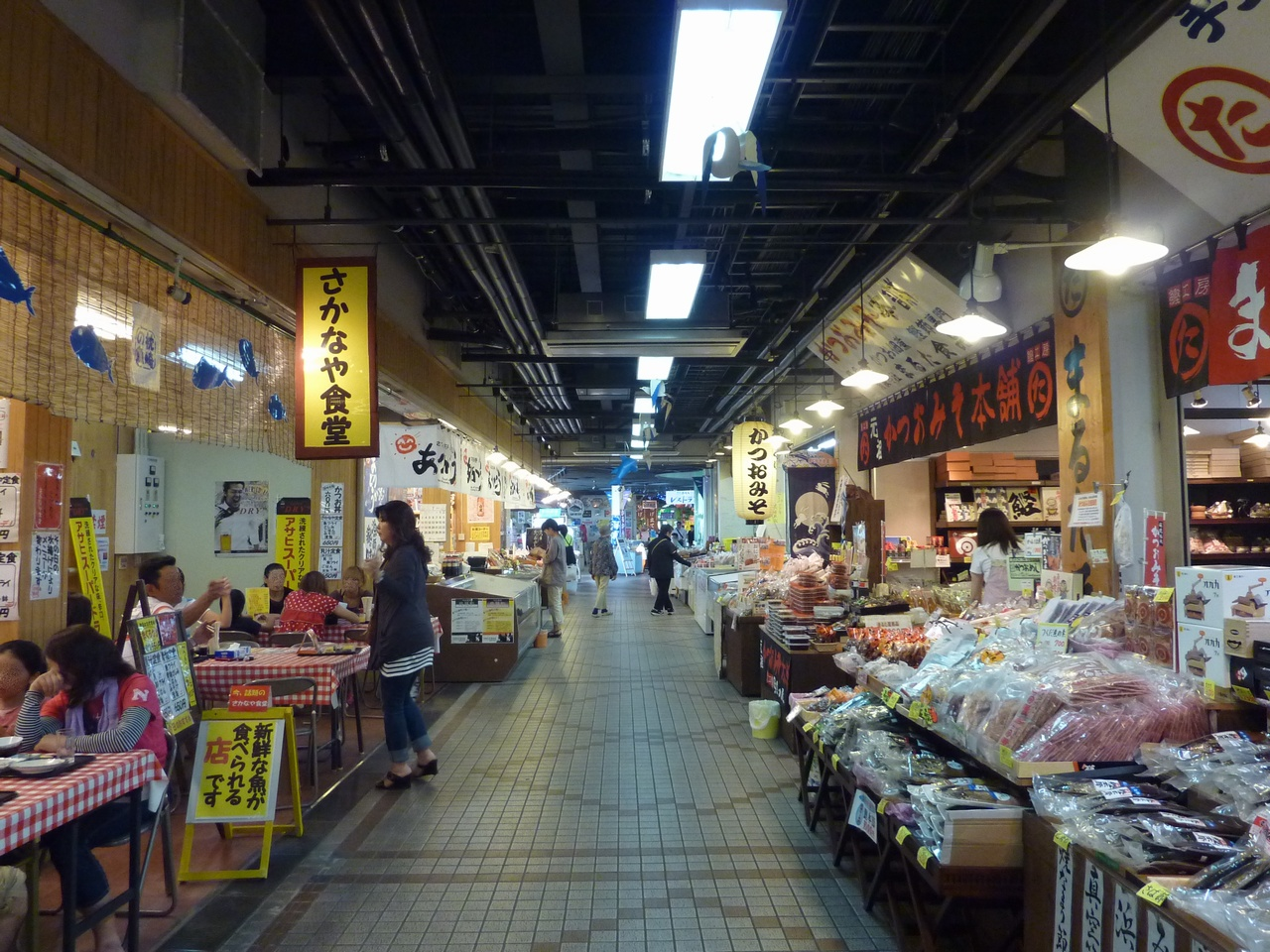
Makurazaki Osakana Center

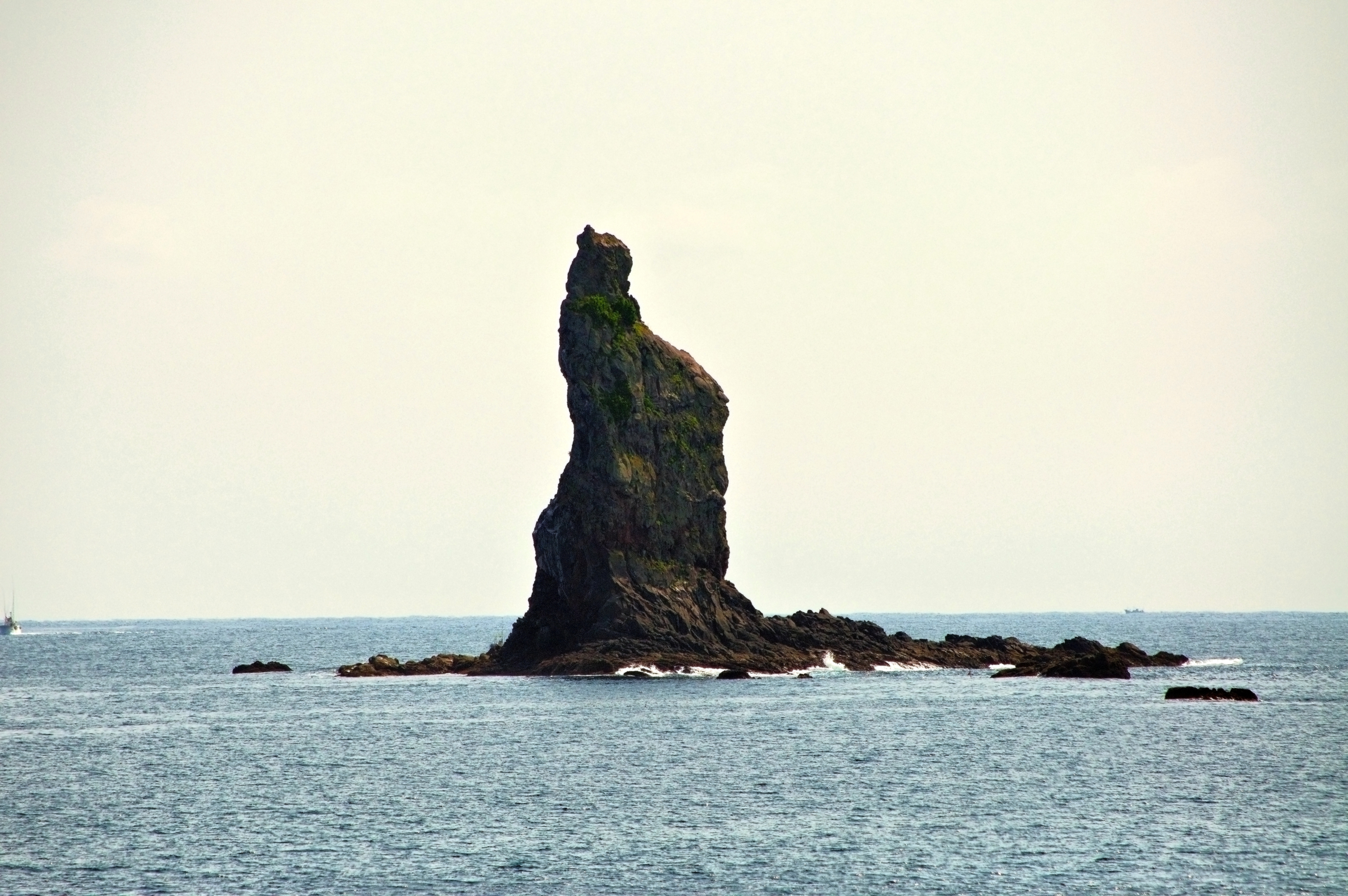
Tategami Rock

Makurazaki (枕崎市, Makurazaki-shi) is a city located in Kagoshima Prefecture, Japan. As of 1 July 2024, the city had an estimated population of 19,006 in 10,377 households, and a population density of 250 persons per km^{2}. The total area of the city is 74.78 km^{2} (28.87 sq mi).

== Geography ==
Makurazaki is located at the southern tip of the Satsuma Peninsula, and faces the East China Sea to the south. The main urban area is near the mouth of the Kedagawa River. The north is forested, the west is a plateau that continues to the Noma Peninsula, and the east is also a plateau called the Minamisatsuma Plateau.

== Surrounding municipalities ==
Kagoshima Prefecture

- Minamikyushu
- Minamisatsuma

=== Climate ===
Makurazaki has a humid subtropical climate (Köppen climate classification Cfa) with hot summers and mild winters. Precipitation is high throughout the year, and is especially high from May to July. The highest record temperature was 36.9 °C (98.4 °F) on August 18, 2020, while the lowest recorded temperature was −4.4 °C (24.1 °F) on February 19, 1977. The Japanese know the city as the "Typhoon Ginza" (after Ginza in Tokyo). Each summer many typhoons strike the Japanese main islands land first in the area of Makurazaki.

Climate data for Makurazaki (1991−2020 normals, extremes 1923−present)
Month	Jan	Feb	Mar	Apr	May	Jun	Jul	Aug	Sep	Oct	Nov	Dec	Year
Record high °C (°F)	22.8 (73.0)	22.8 (73.0)	26.8 (80.2)	28.4 (83.1)	30.2 (86.4)	32.7 (90.9)	36.3 (97.3)	36.9 (98.4)	34.8 (94.6)	32.7 (90.9)	29.4 (84.9)	24.3 (75.7)	36.9 (98.4)
Mean maximum °C (°F)	19.5 (67.1)	20.5 (68.9)	22.0 (71.6)	25.1 (77.2)	28.3 (82.9)	29.8 (85.6)	33.2 (91.8)	34.0 (93.2)	32.3 (90.1)	29.3 (84.7)	25.3 (77.5)	21.5 (70.7)	34.3 (93.7)
Mean daily maximum °C (°F)	12.9 (55.2)	14.0 (57.2)	16.8 (62.2)	20.6 (69.1)	24.1 (75.4)	26.4 (79.5)	30.2 (86.4)	31.4 (88.5)	29.2 (84.6)	25.2 (77.4)	20.3 (68.5)	15.2 (59.4)	22.2 (72.0)
Daily mean °C (°F)	8.9 (48.0)	9.9 (49.8)	12.6 (54.7)	16.5 (61.7)	20.1 (68.2)	23.2 (73.8)	27.0 (80.6)	27.8 (82.0)	25.3 (77.5)	20.8 (69.4)	15.8 (60.4)	10.9 (51.6)	18.2 (64.8)
Mean daily minimum °C (°F)	5.0 (41.0)	5.6 (42.1)	8.3 (46.9)	12.2 (54.0)	16.2 (61.2)	20.4 (68.7)	24.4 (75.9)	24.8 (76.6)	22.0 (71.6)	16.8 (62.2)	11.6 (52.9)	6.8 (44.2)	14.5 (58.1)
Mean minimum °C (°F)	−0.3 (31.5)	0.2 (32.4)	1.6 (34.9)	5.4 (41.7)	10.7 (51.3)	15.5 (59.9)	20.0 (68.0)	21.5 (70.7)	17.2 (63.0)	11.0 (51.8)	5.2 (41.4)	1.2 (34.2)	−0.9 (30.4)
Record low °C (°F)	−3.3 (26.1)	−4.4 (24.1)	−1.7 (28.9)	0.0 (32.0)	5.0 (41.0)	11.2 (52.2)	16.6 (61.9)	16.9 (62.4)	10.7 (51.3)	4.6 (40.3)	−0.5 (31.1)	−3.0 (26.6)	−4.4 (24.1)
Average precipitation mm (inches)	96.2 (3.79)	114.3 (4.50)	167.6 (6.60)	188.3 (7.41)	196.7 (7.74)	512.9 (20.19)	306.9 (12.08)	181.0 (7.13)	236.2 (9.30)	94.8 (3.73)	129.3 (5.09)	111.6 (4.39)	2,335.6 (91.95)
Average snowfall cm (inches)	1 (0.4)	trace	0 (0)	0 (0)	0 (0)	0 (0)	0 (0)	0 (0)	0 (0)	0 (0)	0 (0)	0 (0)	1 (0.4)
Average precipitation days (≥ 1.0 mm)	10.5	10.0	12.6	9.9	9.9	15.1	9.9	9.8	10.0	7.1	8.9	9.8	123.5
Average snowy days (≥ 1 cm)	0.3	0.2	0	0	0	0	0	0	0	0	0	0	0.5
Average relative humidity (%)	68	68	69	71	75	83	82	79	77	72	72	70	74
Mean monthly sunshine hours	109.9	121.3	153.2	173.2	176.9	109.5	203.0	222.8	186.7	181.8	149.3	125.6	1,913.1
Source: Japan Meteorological Agency (records 1872–present)

== Demographics ==
Per Japanese census data, the population of Makurazaki in 2020 is 20,033 people. Makurazaki has been conducting a census since 1920, and the city's population peaked in the 1950s at more than 35,000 people; the population has declined slowly since then. The population of Makurazaki in 2020 is only 70% of the 1955 census.

Historical population

Year	Pop.	±%
1920	23,577	—
1925	24,920	+5.7%
1930	27,239	+9.3%
1935	28,000	+2.8%
1940	29,057	+3.8%
1945	32,717	+12.6%
1950	34,480	+5.4%
1955	35,546	+3.1%
1960	33,511	−5.7%
1965	31,464	−6.1%
1970	30,084	−4.4%

Year	Pop.	±%
1975	29,685	−1.3%
1980	30,060	+1.3%
1985	30,099	+0.1%
1990	28,794	−4.3%
1995	27,640	−4.0%
2000	26,317	−4.8%
2005	25,150	−4.4%
2010	23,645	−6.0%
2015	22,046	−6.8%
2020	20,033	−9.1%

Makurazaki population statistics

== History ==
The area of Makurazaki is part of ancient Satsuma Province and was part of the holdings of Satsuma Domain in the Edo period. The village of Tonangata in Kawabe District was established on April 1, 1889, with the creation of the modern municipalities system. Tonangata was raised to town status on July 1, 1923, and renamed Makurazaki. On September 17, 1945, the Makurazaki Typhoon made landfall at Makurazaki and killed 12 people, destroying 2,339 houses. (Nationwide, 2,473 people were killed, 1,283 were missing, 89,839 houses were damaged, and 273,888 houses were flooded.) Makurazaki was raised to city status on September 1, 1949. Plans to merge Makurazaki and neighboring Chiran, Kagoshima were defeated in 2004, with Chiran subsequently becoming part of Minamikyushu.

== Government ==
Makurazaki has a mayor-council form of government with a directly elected mayor and a unicameral city council of 14 members. Makurazaki contributes one member to the Kagoshima Prefectural Assembly. In terms of national politics, the city is part of the Kagoshima 2nd district of the lower house of the Diet of Japan.

== Economy ==
Minamisatsuma has a rural economy based on commercial fishing and food processing. It is famous for its katsuobushi processing plants, which produce the chief flavoring ingredient—dried fish flakes—found in Japanese miso soup. About 70 small family businesses year-round boil, cut, dry and smoke the pungent fish, often sending a unique odor of steam, smoke and fish scent across the downtown area and out to sea.

== Education ==
Makurazaki has four public elementary schools and four public junior high schools operated by the city government, and two public high schools operated by the Kagoshima Prefectural Board of Education.

== Transportation ==
=== Railways ===
JR Kyushu - Ibusuki Makurazaki Line

■ Shirasawa - Satsuma-Itashiki - Makurazaki

=== Highways ===
- National Route 225
- National Route 226
- National Route 270
