= Ichiki Station =

Railway station in Ichikikushikino, Kagoshima Prefecture, Japan

Ichiki Station 市来駅
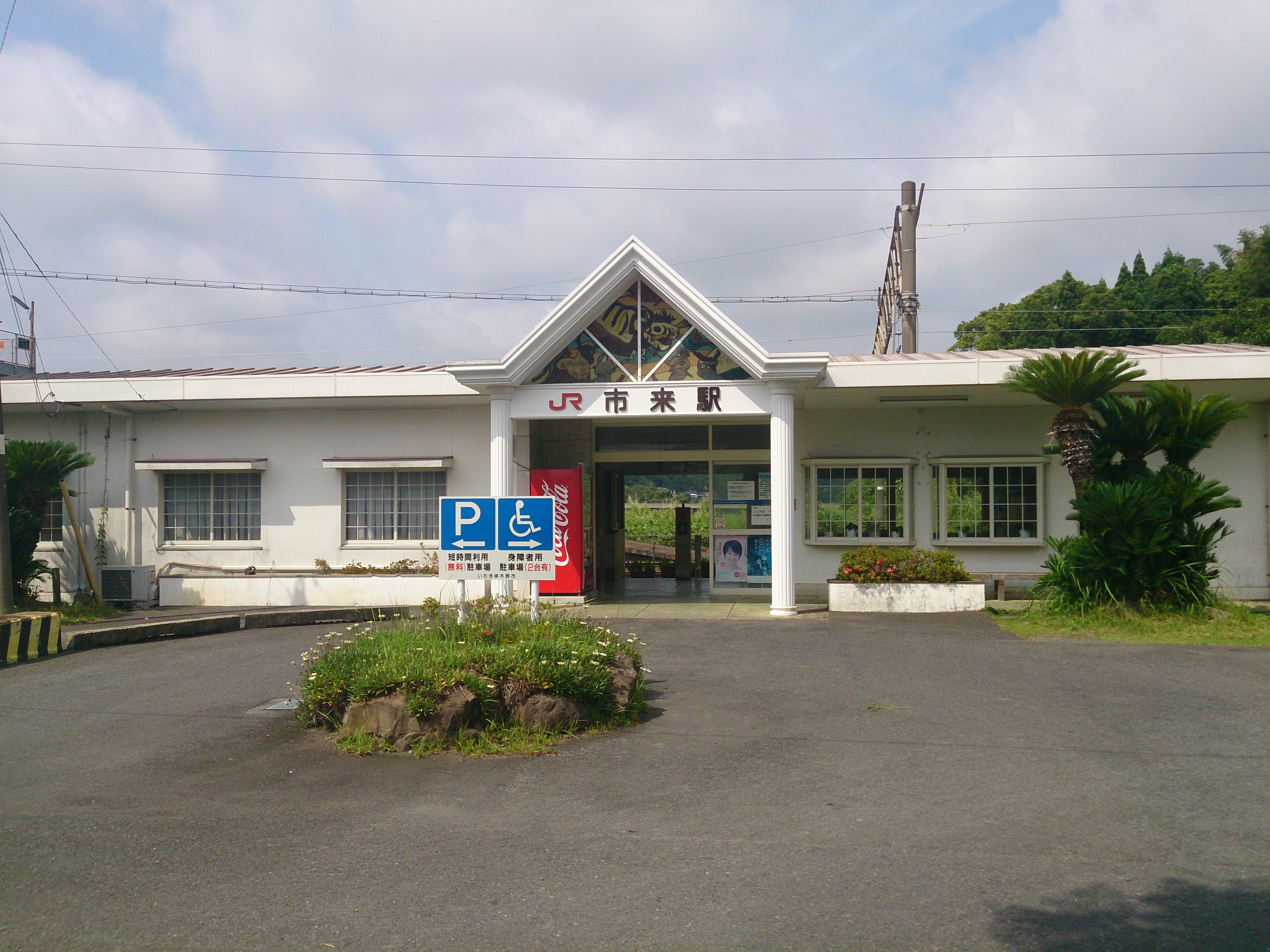
- Ichiki Station in June 2013

General information
- Location: Ozato, Ichikikushikino-shi, Kagoshima-ken 899-2103; Japan
- Coordinates: 31°41′23.68″N 130°18′10.29″E
- Operator: JR Kyushu
- Line: ■ Kagoshima Main Line
- Distance: 365.8 km from Mojikō
- Platforms: 1 side + 1 island platform

Other information
- Status: Unstaffed
- Website: Official website

History
- Opened: 25 December 1913
- Former names: Nishi-Ichiki (to 1930)

Passengers
- FY2020: 293 daily

Services
Preceding station	JR Kyushu	Following station
Yunomoto towards Kagoshima	Kagoshima Main Line	Kamimuragakuenmae towards Mojikō
Location
- Location within Kagoshima Prefecture Location within Japan

Ichiki Station (市来駅, Ichiki-eki) is a passenger railway station located in the city of Ichikikushikino, Kagoshima Prefecture, Japan. It is operated by JR Kyushu.

== Lines ==
The station is served by the Kagoshima Main Line and is located 365.8 km from the starting point of the line at Mojikō.

=== Layout ===
The station is an above-ground station with one side platform and island platform and two tracks, connected by a level crossing. The station is unattended.

=== Platforms ===
1	■ ■ Kagoshima Main Line	for Ijuin and Kagoshima-Chūō for Sendai
2	■ ■ Kagoshima Main Line	<siding>
3	■ ■ Kagoshima Main Line	for Ijuin and Kagoshima-Chūō

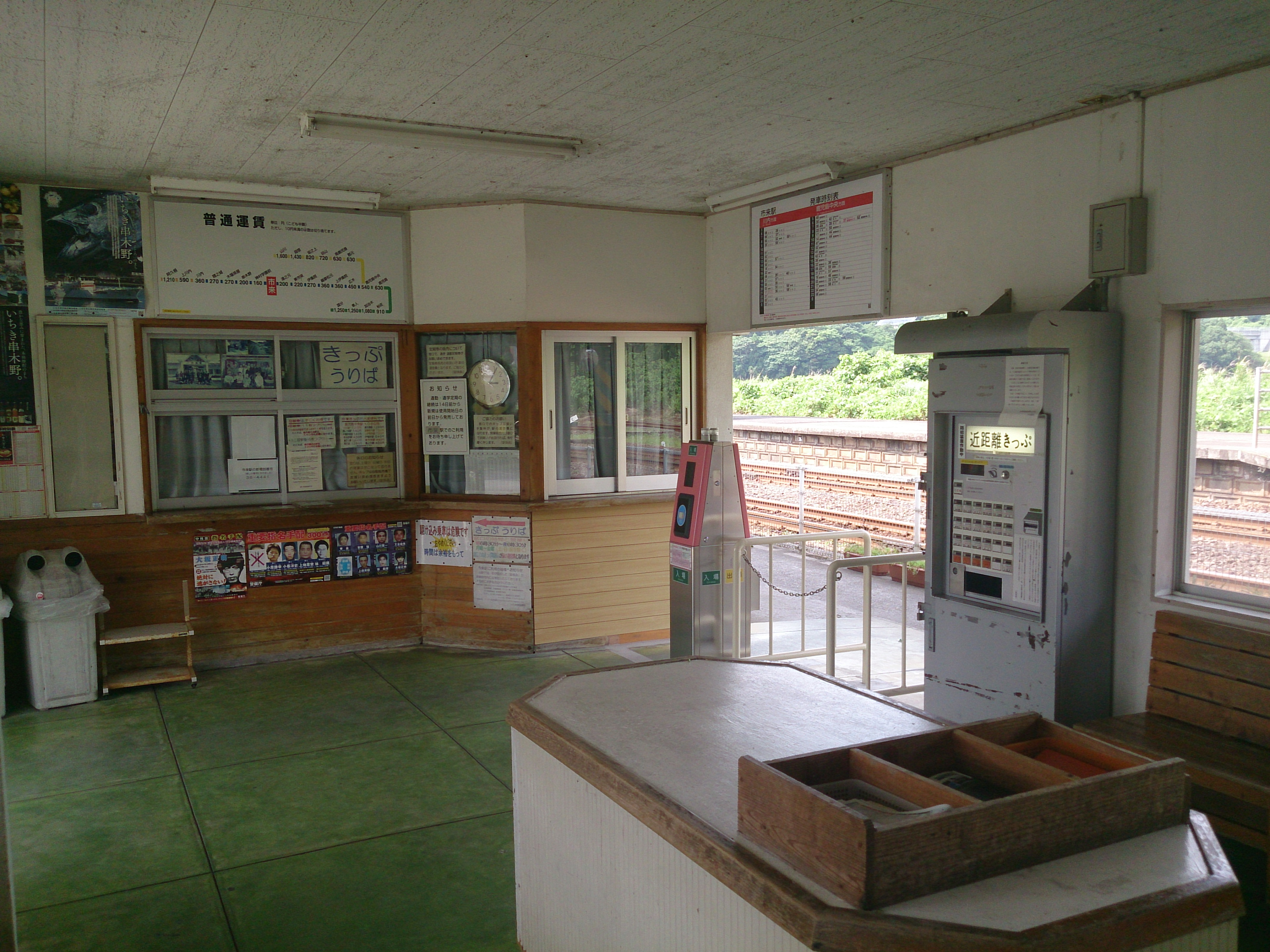
Inside the station building

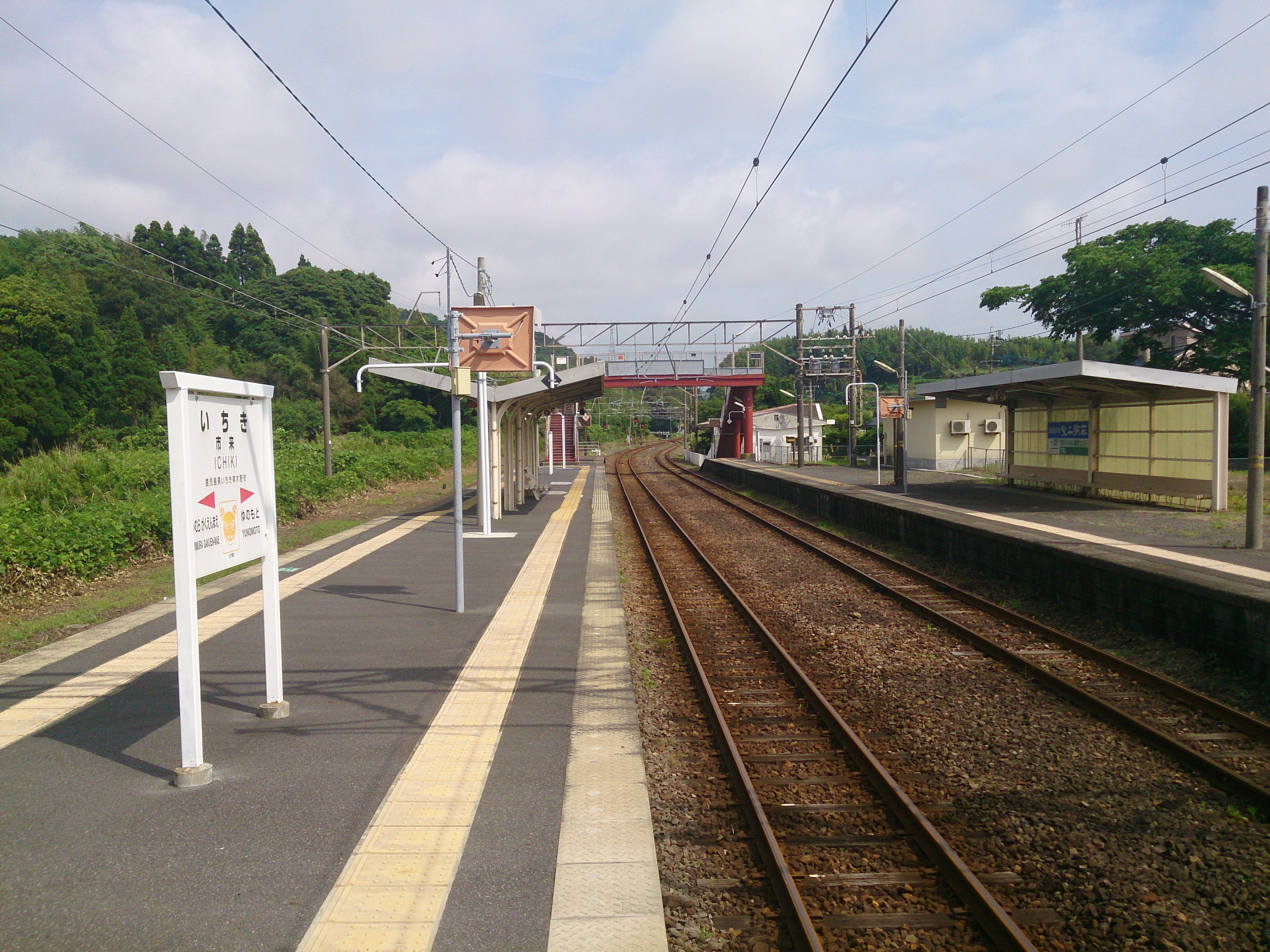
Platform (looking towards Kagoshima-Chūō)

== History ==
The station was opened by Japanese Government Railways (JGR) on 25 December 1913 as Nishi-Ichiki Station (西市来駅). It was renamed to its present name on 3 November 1930. With the privatization of Japanese National Railways (JNR), the successor of JGR, on 1 April 1987, JR Kyushu took over control of the station.

== Passenger statistics ==
In fiscal 2020, the station was used by an average of 293 passengers daily (boarding passengers only), and it ranked 279th among the busiest stations of JR Kyushu.

== Surrounding area ==
- IIchikikushikino City Hall Ichiki Branch Office (formerly Ichiki Town Hall)
- Kagoshima Prefectural Ichiki Agricultural High School
- Ichikikushikino City Ichiki Junior High School
- Ichikikushikino City Ichiki Elementary School

== See also ==
- List of railway stations in Japan
