= Ichikikushikino =

Ichikikushikino いちき串木野市
- City
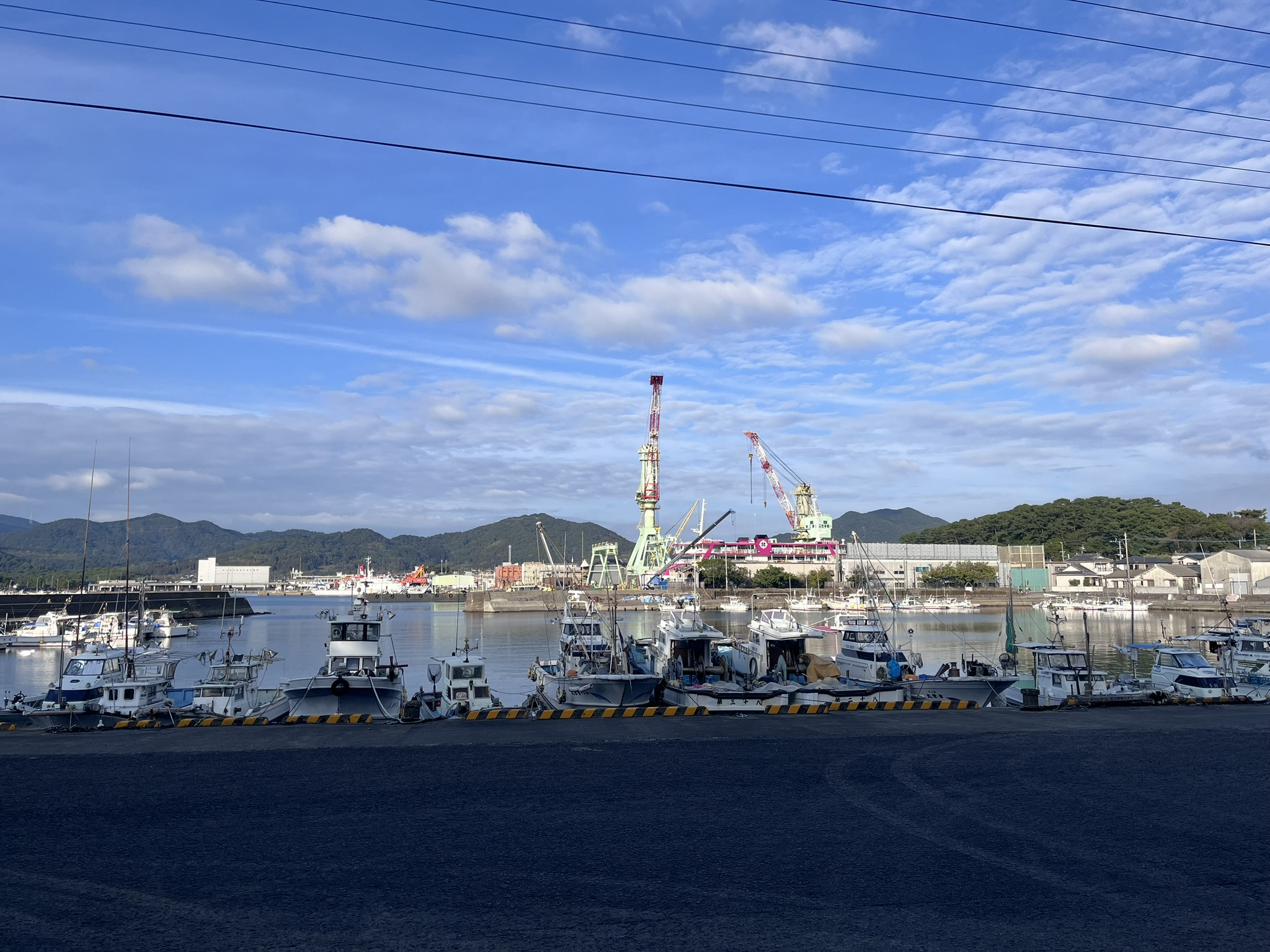

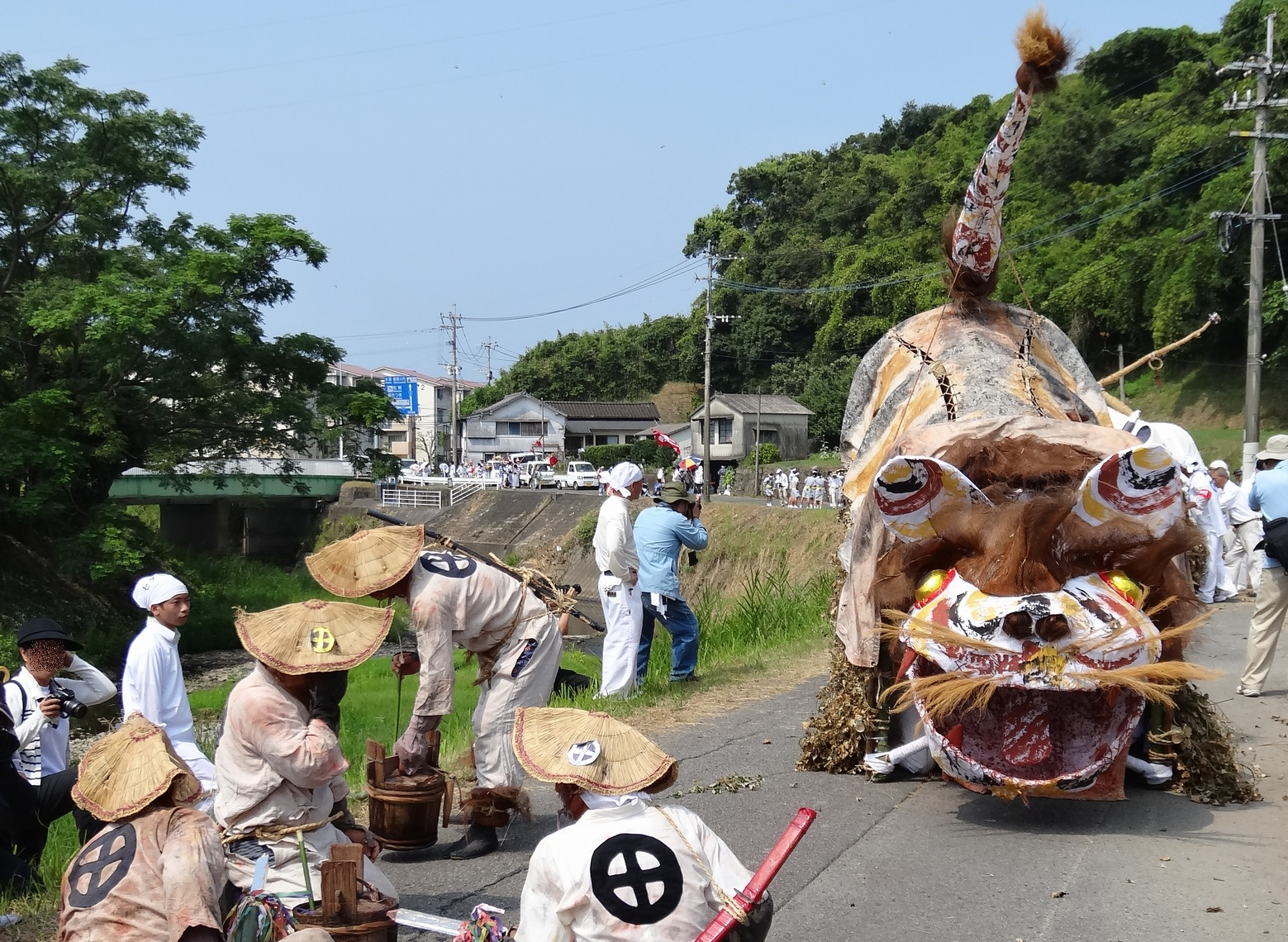

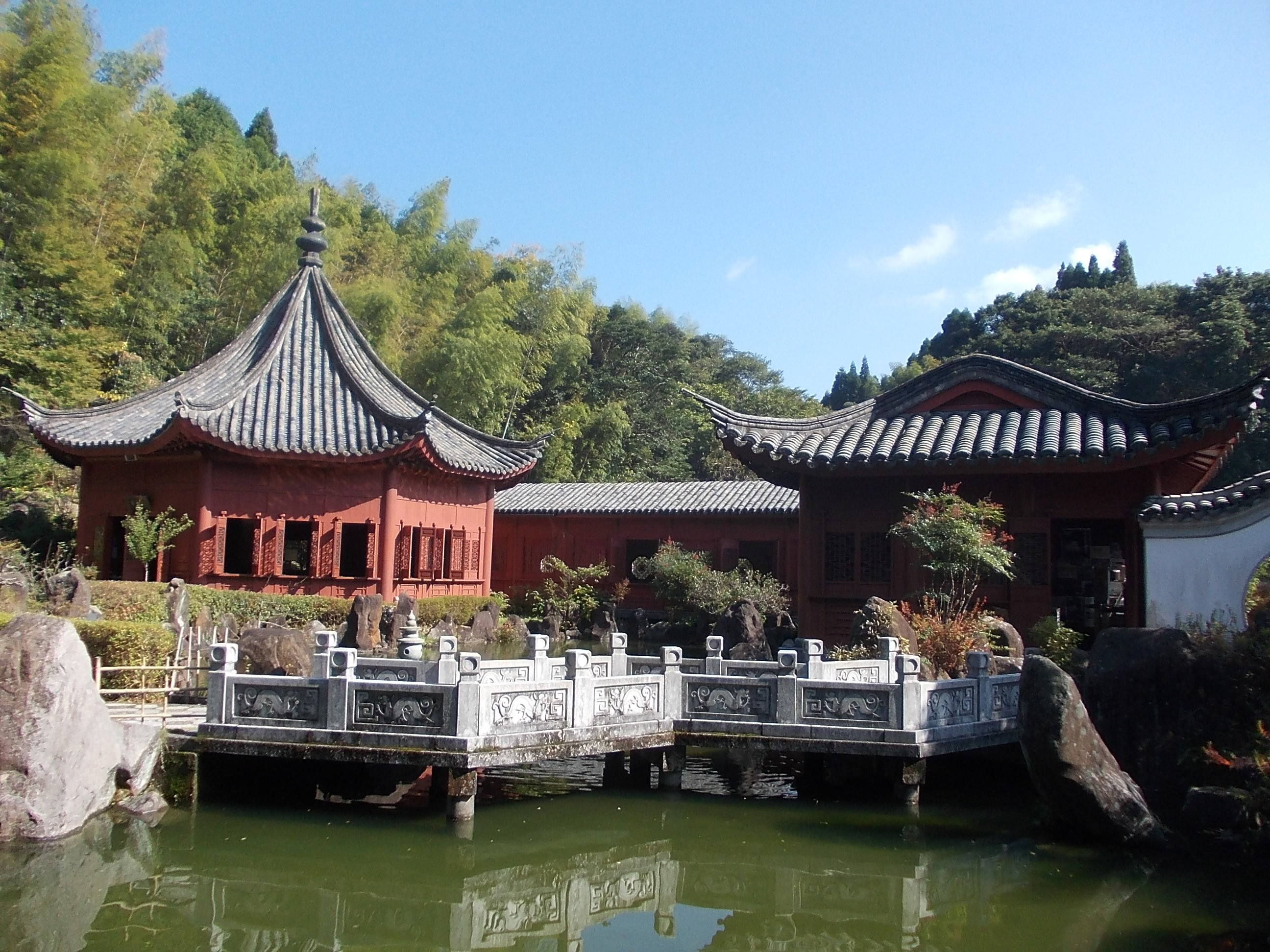

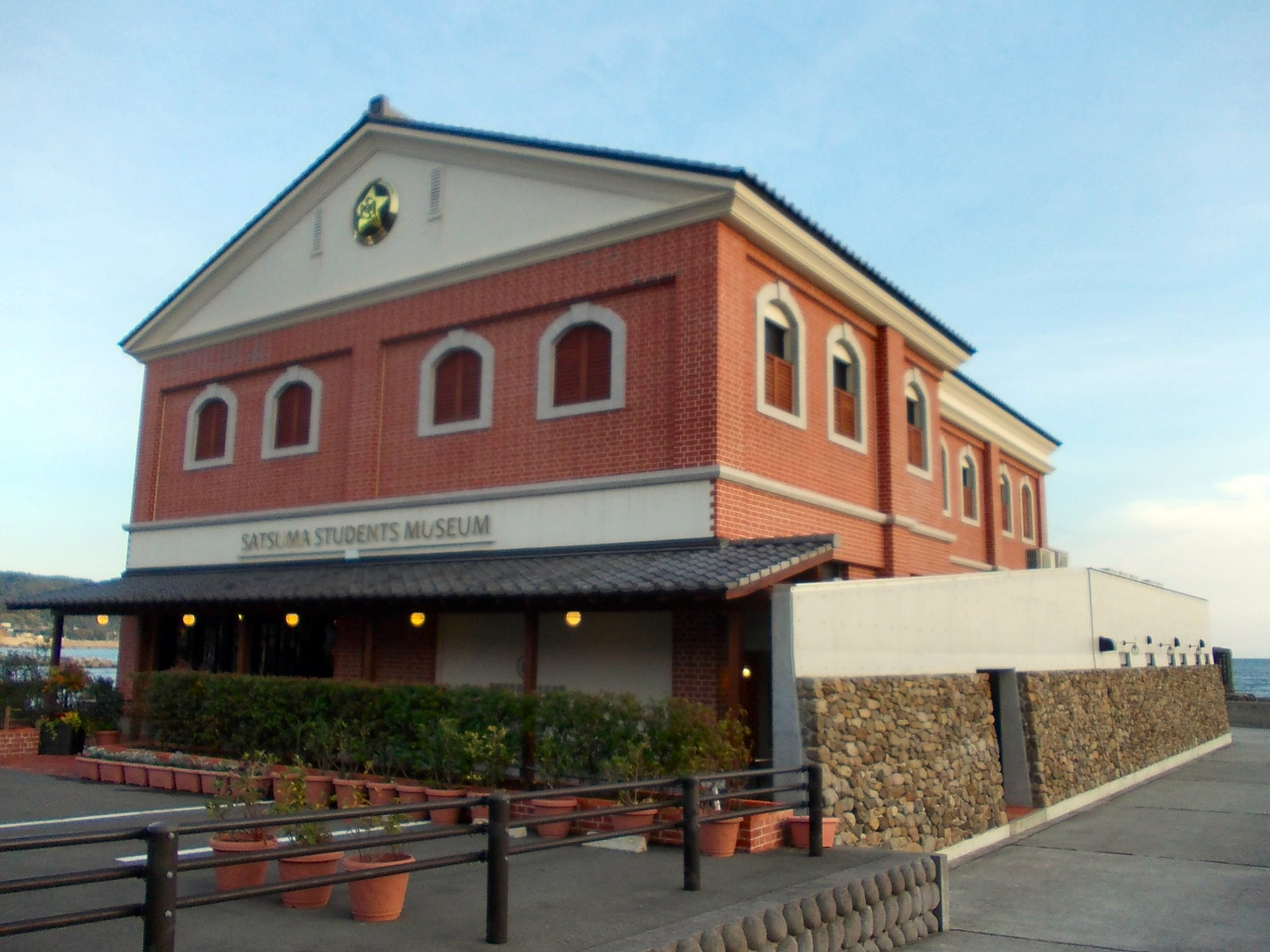

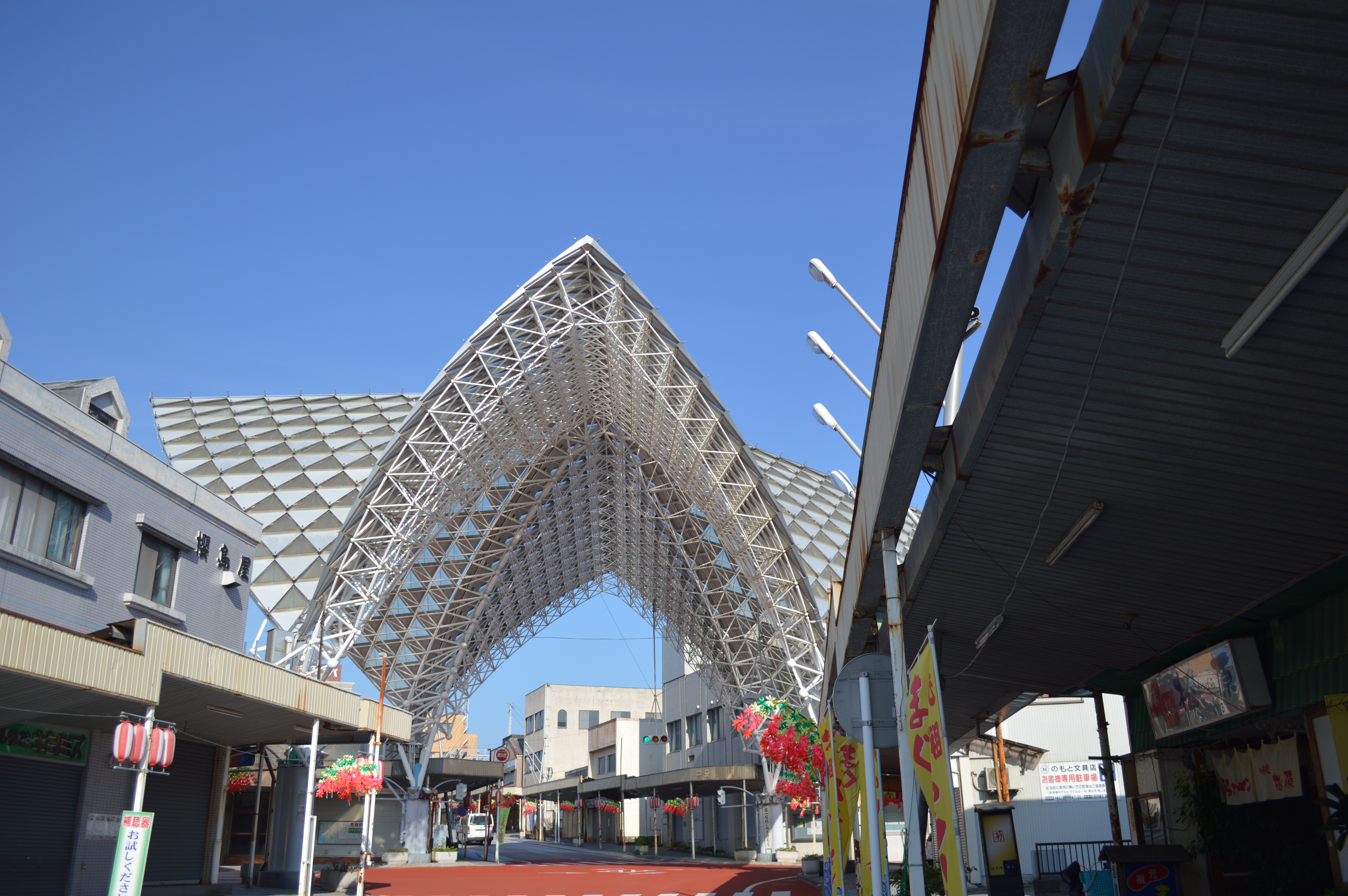
Kushikino Port
Tanabata Street	Kangaku-en
Satsuma Students Museum	Kushikino Shopping District
- Flag Emblem
- Interactive map of Ichikikushikino
- Location in Japan
- Coordinates: 31°42′52″N 130°16′19″E
- Country: Japan
- Region: Kyushu
- Prefecture: Kagoshima

Government
  - Mayor: Seiichi Tabata (since November 2005)

Area
  - Total: 112.30 km^{2} (43.36 sq mi)

Population (June 30, 2024)
  - Total: 25,912
  - Density: 230.74/km^{2} (597.61/sq mi)
- Time zone: UTC+09:00 (JST)
- City hall address: Showa-dori 133-1, Ichikikushikuno-shi, Kagoshima-ken 896-8601
- Website: Official website
- Symbols
- Flower: Cherry blossom
- Tree: Pinus

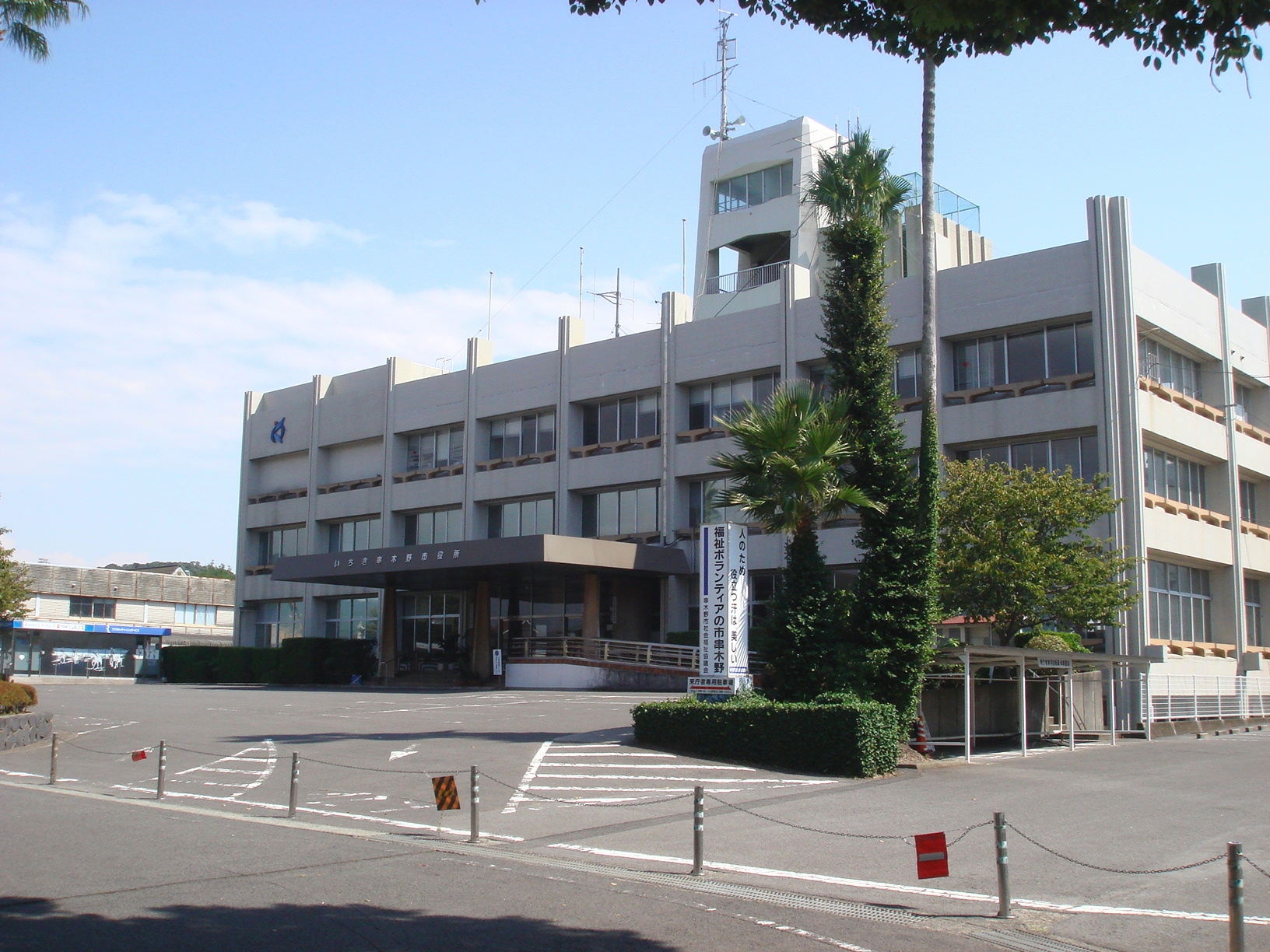
Ichikikushikino City Office

Ichikikushikino (いちき串木野市, Ichikikushikino-shi; Japanese pronunciation: [ì.c̟͡ɕi̥.k̟ʲí.kɯ̈́.ɕi̥.k̟ʲí.nó̞(.ɕì)]) is a city located in Kagoshima Prefecture, Japan. As of 14 September 2025, the city had an estimated population of 25,479 in 13117 households, and a population density of 59 persons per km^{2}. The total area of the city is 112.30 km^{2} (43.36 sq mi).

== Geography ==
Ichikikushikino is located in the west of the mainland of Kagoshima Prefecture. The city stretches long and narrow from east to west, and is divided into the Kushikino district and Ichiki district which are separated by the Yabusa River.

=== Surrounding municipalities ===
Kagoshima Prefecture

- Hioki
- Satsumasendai

=== Climate ===
Ichikikushikino has a humid subtropical climate (Köppen Cfa) characterized by warm summers and cool winters with light to no snowfall. The average annual temperature in Ichikikushikino is 17.6 °C. The average annual rainfall is 2336 mm with September as the wettest month. The temperatures are highest on average in August, at around 27.0 °C, and lowest in January, at around 8.4 °C.

=== Demographics ===
Per Japanese census data, the population of Ichikikushikino is as shown below:

Historical population
Year	Pop.	±%
1940	34,893	—
1950	44,358	+27.1%
1960	42,376	−4.5%
1970	38,898	−8.2%
1980	38,377	−1.3%
1990	36,790	−4.1%
2000	34,266	−6.9%
2010	31,144	−9.1%
2020	27,490	−11.7%
2025	25,627	−6.8%

== History ==
Ichikikushikino is part of ancient Satsuma Province and was part of the holdings of Satsuma Domain in the Edo period. On April 1, 1889, the villages of Kushikino, and Nishiichiki were established with the creation of the modern municipalities system. Nishiichiki was raised to town status in 1930, becoming the town of Ichiki, followed by Kushikino in 1935. On October 1, 1950 Kushikino was raised to city status. The city of Ichikikushikino was established on October 11, 2005, from the merger of the city of Kushikino with the town of Ichiki (from Hioki District).

== Government ==
Ichikikushikino has a mayor-council form of government with a directly elected mayor and a unicameral city council of 16 members. Ichikikushikino contributes one member to the Kagoshima Prefectural Assembly. In terms of national politics, the city is part of the Kagoshima 3rd district of the lower house of the Diet of Japan.

== Economy ==
The main economy activity of Ichikikushikino is agriculture and commercial fishing. There are five fish ports in the city, and the main items are tuna, sardines, and mackerel.

== Education ==
Ichikikushikino has eight public elementary schools and six public junior high schools by the city government, and three public high schools operated by the Kagoshima Prefectural Board of Education. There is also one private elementary, junior high and high school (Kamimura Gakuen).

== Transportation ==
=== Railways ===
JR Kyushu - Kagoshima Main Line

■ Kushikino - Kamimuragakuenmae - Ichiki

=== Highways ===
- Minamikyushu Expressway
- National Route 3
- National Route 270

=== Maritime traffic ===
- To get to the Kosikima Islands, this city or Satsumasendai-shi You have to take a boat from this city.

== Sister cities ==
- Salinas, California, United States, since 1979

== Notable people from Ichikikushikino ==
- Moka Kamishiraishi, actress
- Mone Kamishiraishi, actress
- Kunio Nakagaki, politician
- Katsuro Onoue, movie special effects director

== Local attractions ==
The city celebrates an annual maguro festival.

== Sports ==
Kamimura Gakuen, who won the Kagoshima qualifying round at the National High School Baseball Tournament in Japan, is in Ichikikukushinoshi
