= Ichiki, Kagoshima =

Dissolved municipality in Kagoshima prefecture, Japan

Ichiki (市来町, Ichiki-chō) was a town located in Hioki District, Kagoshima Prefecture, Japan.

As of 2003, the town had an estimated population of 7,088 and the density of 224.59 persons per km^{2}. The total area was 31.56 km^{2}.

On October 11, 2005, Ichiki, along with the city of Kushikino, was merged to create the city of Ichikikushikino and no longer exists as an independent municipality.
