= Sendai Station (Kagoshima) =

Railway station in Satsumasendai, Kagoshima Prefecture, Japan

Sendai Station 川内駅
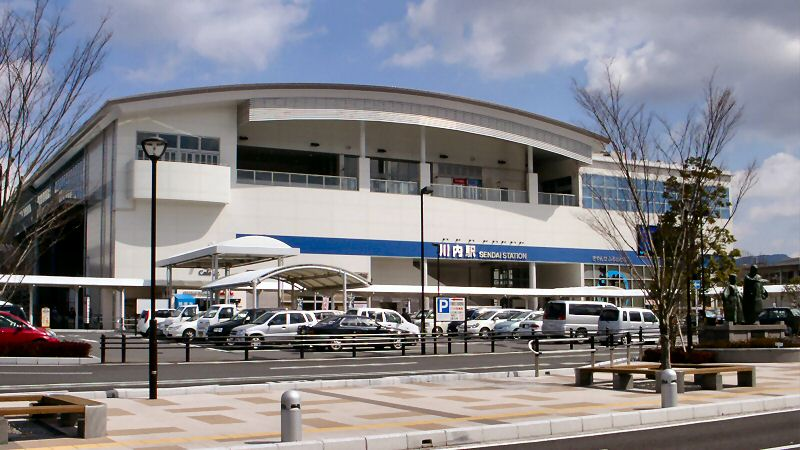
- Sendai Station West Entrance

General information
- Location: 1-1 Torioi-chō, Satsumasendai-shi, Kagoshima-ken 895-0024; Japan
- Operator: JR Kyushu; Hisatsu Orange Railway
- Lines: Kyūshū Shinkansen; Kagoshima Main Line; Hisatsu Orange Railway Line
- Platforms: Shinkansen: 2 side platforms Conventional lines: 1 island platform
- Tracks: 5 (2 Shinkansen)

Other information
- Station code: OR28

History
- Opened: 1 June 1914
- Former names: Sendai-machi (to 1940)

Passengers
- FY2020: 2454 (JR)

Services
Preceding station	JR Kyushu	Following station
Kagoshima-Chūō Terminus	Kyūshū Shinkansen Mizuho (Some trains only)	Kumamoto towards Hakata
Kagoshima-Chūō Terminus	Kyūshū Shinkansen Sakura Tsubame	Izumi towards Hakata
Location
- Location within Kagoshima Prefecture Location within Japan

Sendai Station (川内駅, Sendai-eki) is a passenger railway station located in the city of Ichikikushikino, Kagoshima Prefecture, Japan. It is operated by JR Kyushu and the third-sector railway company Hisatsu Orange Railway.

== Lines ==
Sendai Station is served by the Kyushu Shinkansen and Kagoshima Main Line, and is 242.8 kilometers from Hakata and 349.2 kilometers from Mojikō. It was also the westernmost high-speed Shinkansen railway station in Japan, though this title was taken over by Nagasaki Station with the opening of the West Kyushu Shinkansen on 23 September 2022. It is the southern terminus of the Hisatsu Orange Railway Line and is 116.9 kilometers from the opposing terminus at Yatsushiro.

== Layout ==
The Shinkansen portion of the station consists of two ground-level opposed side platforms with two tracks, while the conventional lines use one island platform with two tracks, with platforms 1 and 2 (JR Kagoshima Main Line) in the southern half and platforms 3 and 4 (Hisatsu Orange Railway) in the northern half. In addition, there is one unused side platform on the station building side. The Shinkansen also has a storage track on the Kagoshima-Chuo side. The station building is elevated above the tracks and has a Midori no Madoguchi staffed ticket office.

== Platforms ==
1/2	■ Kagoshima Main Line	for Kushikino and Kagoshima-Chūō
3	■ Hisatsu Orange Railway Line	for Izumi
4	■ Hisatsu Orange Railway Line	for Izumi to the JR Kyushu Kagoshima Line for Kumanojo and Kagoshima-Chūō
11	Kyushu Shinkansen	for Hakata and Shin-Ōsaka
12	Kyushu Shinkansen	for Kagoshima-Chūō

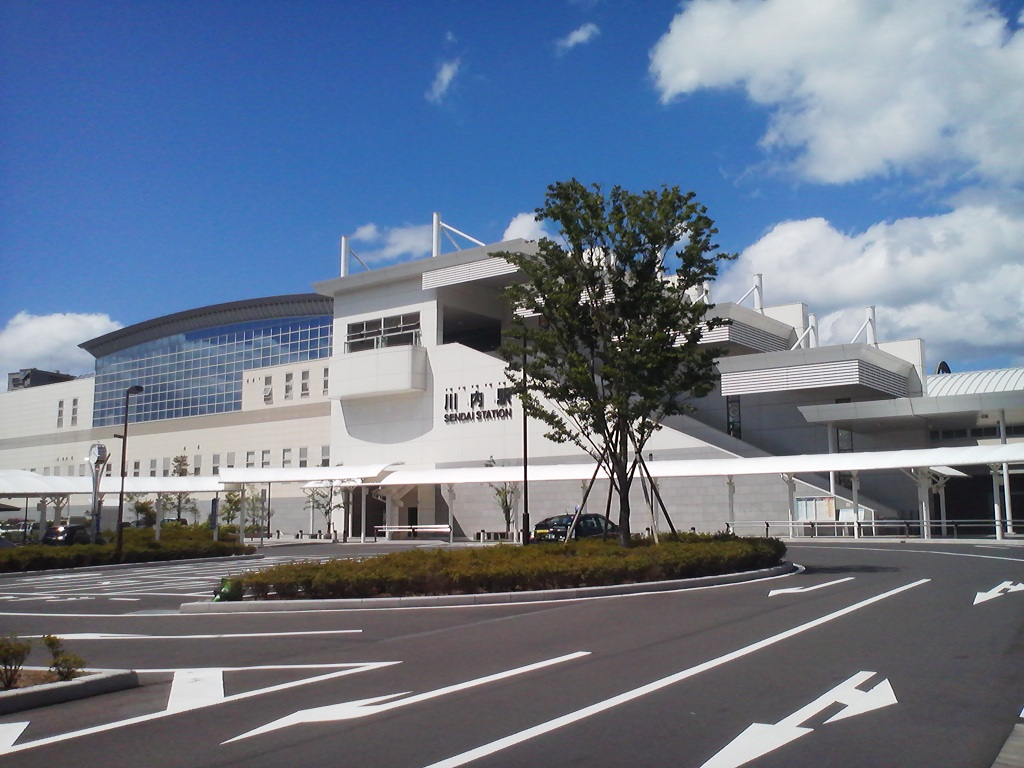
East Entrance (2012)

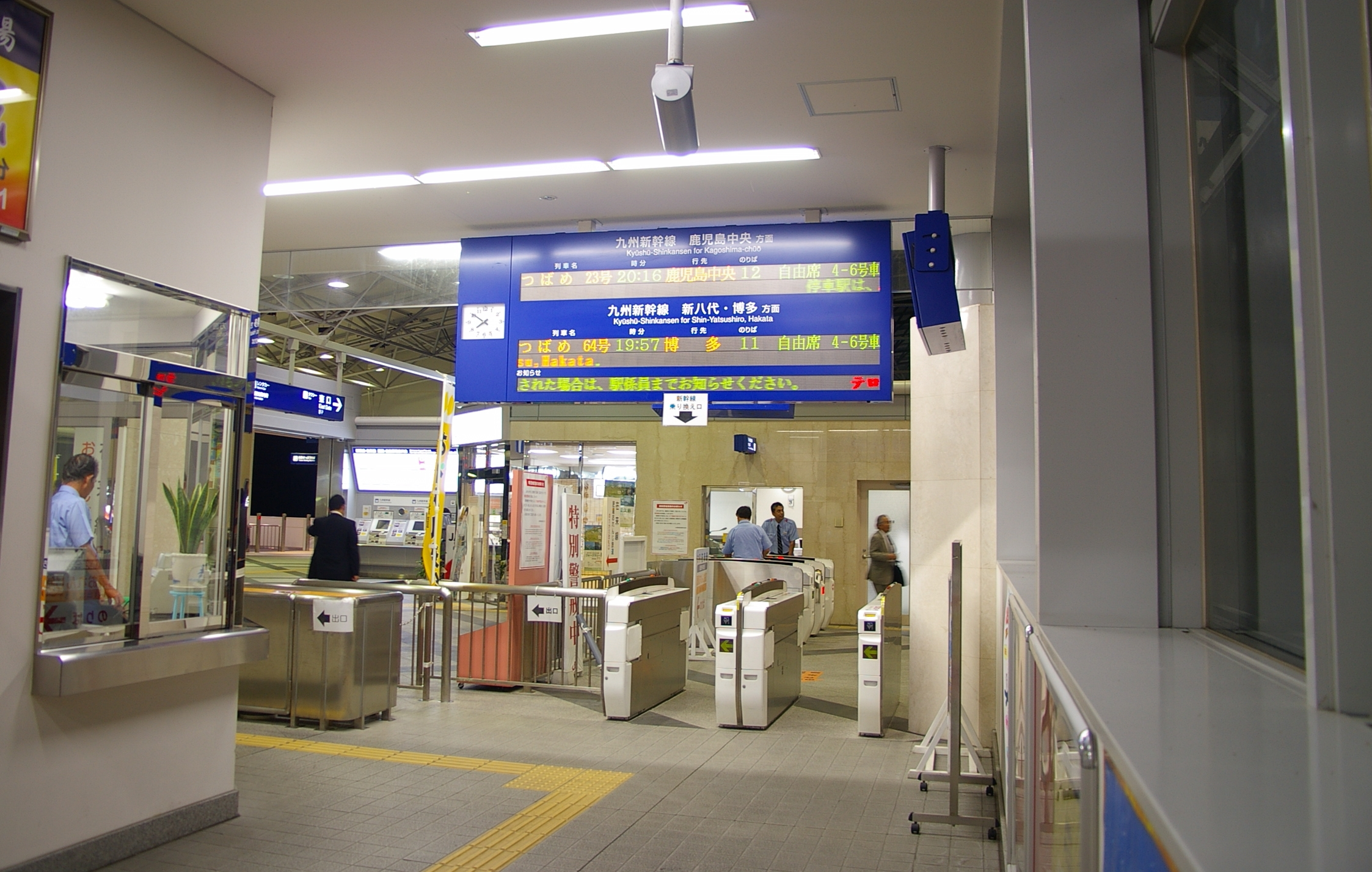
Local Line ticket barrier and Shinkansen connection ticket barrier (2006)

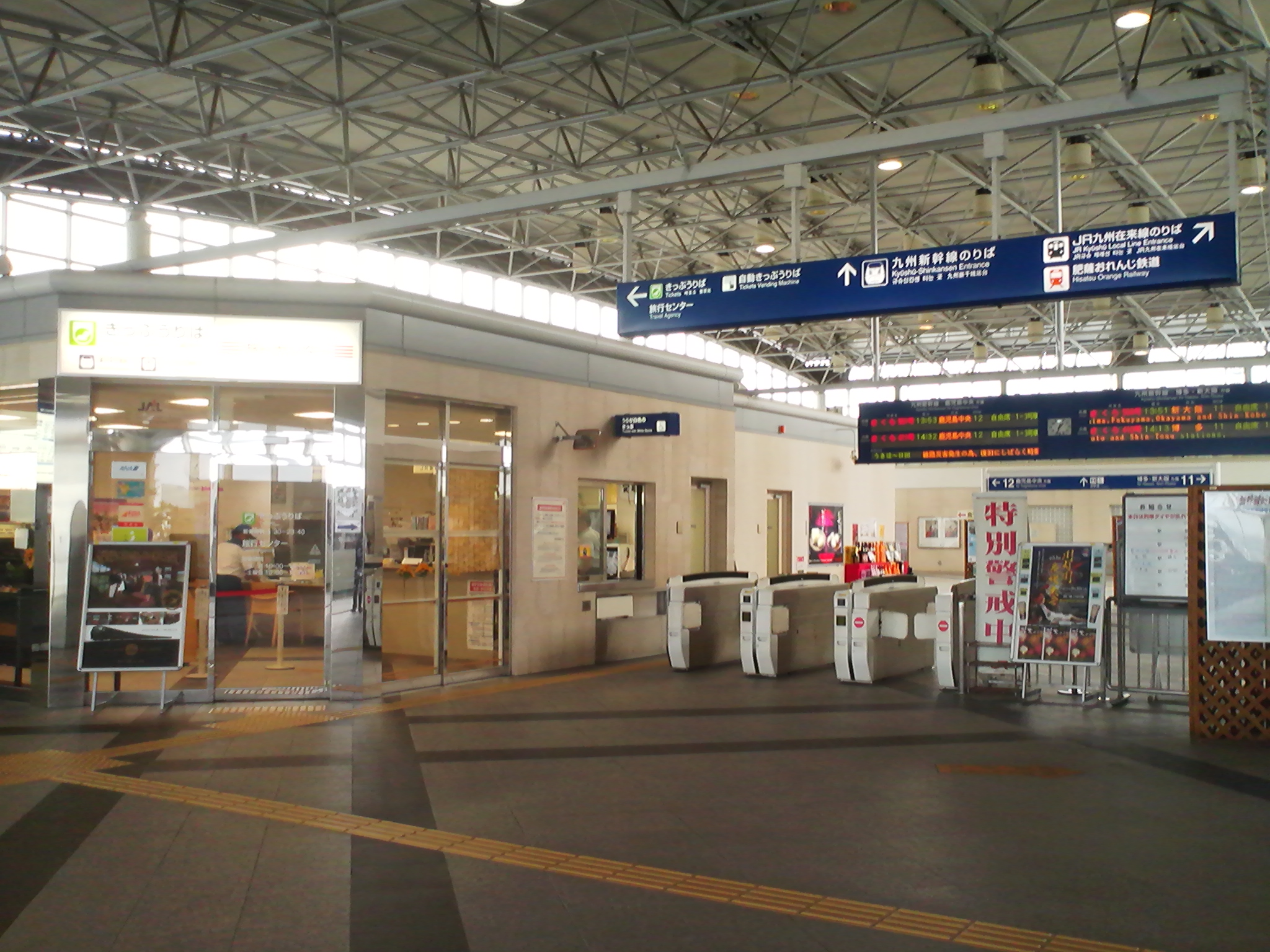
Shinkansen ticket barrier (2012)

== Adjacent stations ==
←	Service	→
Kagoshima Main Line
Kami-Sendai through to Hisatsu Orange Railway	Local and Sendai Express	Kumanojō
Kami-Sendai (Hisatsu Orange Railway)	Ocean Liner Satsuma	Kushikino
Hisatsu Orange Railway Line
Kami-Sendai	Local	Kumanojō

== History ==
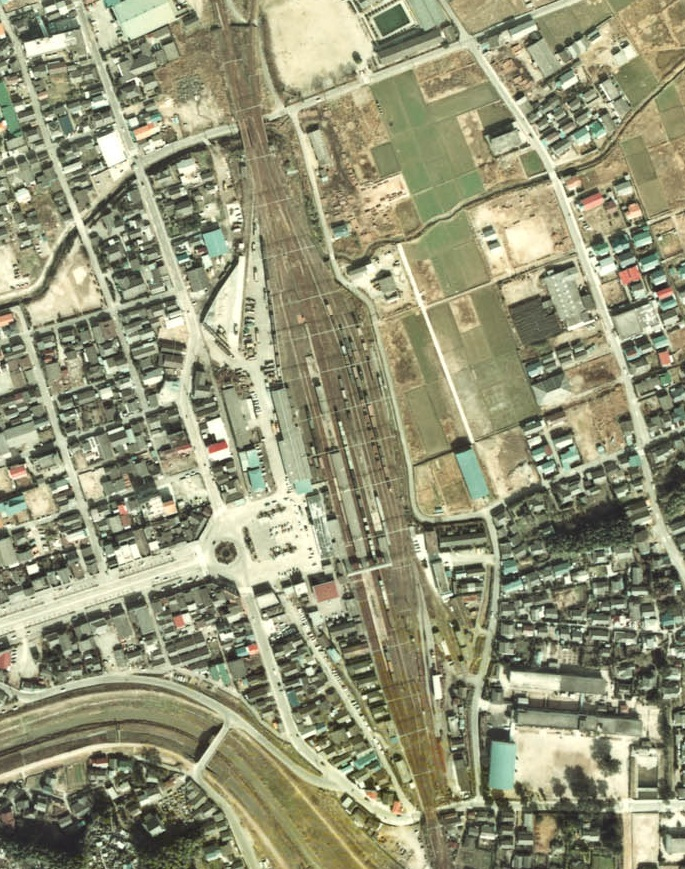
Sendai Station in 1974

- June 1, 1914 - The station opened as Sendai-machi Station (川内町駅) on the Sendai Line.
- 1922 - Track from Sendai-Machi Station to Nishikata Station opens.
- October 20, 1924 - Track from Sendai Station to Hiwaki Station is opened for as Miyanojo Line.
- October 1, 1940 - Sendai-machi Station was renamed Sendai Station.
- January 10, 1987 - Miyanojo line is abolished (From Sendai Station to Satsuma-Ōkuchi Station).
- March 13, 2004 - Kyushu Shinkansen services began.

== Passenger statistics ==
In fiscal 2020, the JR portion of the station was used by an average of 2022 passengers daily (boarding passengers only), and it ranked 70th among the busiest stations of JR Kyushu. During the same period, the Hisatsu Orange Railway portion of the station was used by 105 passengers daily.

== Surrounding area ==
- Satsumasendai City Hall
- Sendai Post Office
