= Bansei Airfield =

Imperial Japanese Army aviation base

Bansei Airfield
- Kaseda, Kagoshima Prefecture in Japan
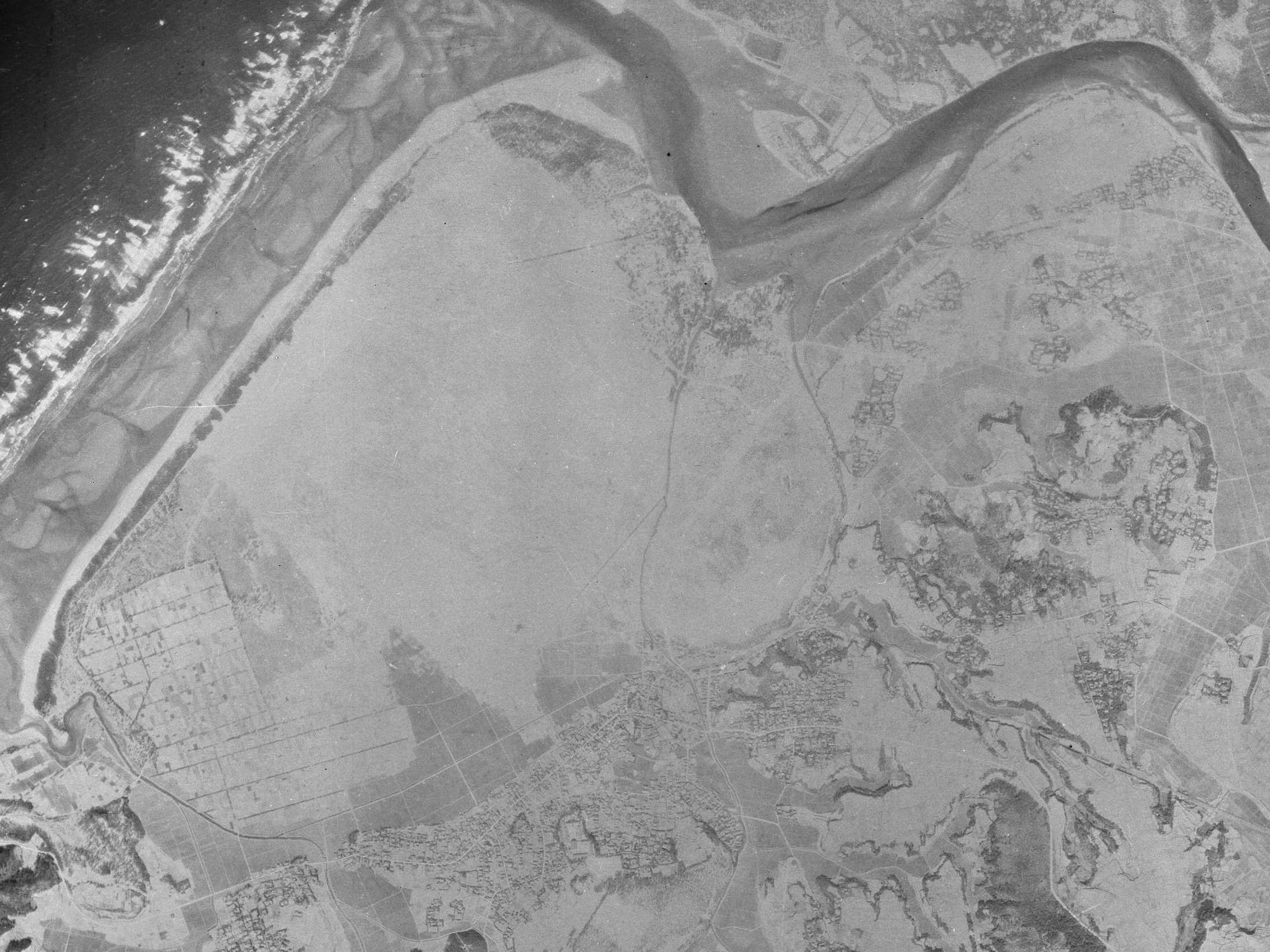
- Remains of Bansei Airfield in 1947.

Site information
- Owner: Imperial Japanese Army
- Operator: Imperial Japanese Army Air Force

Location
- Shown within Japan
- Coordinates: 31°26′14″N 130°17′23″E

Site history
- Built: 1945
- Built by: Japanese Army
- In use: March 1945 - 15 August 1945
- Fate: Abandoned
- Battles/wars: Pacific War

Airfield information
- Elevation: 8.2m AMSL

Bansei Airfield, also known as Kaseda Airfield, is a former Imperial Japanese Army aviation base located in the town of Kaseda in Kagoshima Prefecture, Kyushu Island in Japan. Because of its brief period of operation, it is also known as the “phantom special attack base.”

== History ==
In July, 1943, Bansei Airfield begun construction on Fukiagehama Beach with the cooperation of the Japanese Imperial Army and local people. The project was secretive, and it was built to facilitate the defense of Okinawa Island. It was also one of the last to be built for kamikaze pilots. It was constructed on a large sand dune, using the dune itself as a runway. It was completed in March 1945 and kamikazes began flying from the airfield on the 28th, mostly using Type 99 assault aircraft. The airfield was only used for four months.

On 25 May 1945, the 72nd Shinbu Squadron arrived at Bansei Airfield from Metabaru Airfield. Its two Type 99 assault planes flew from the airfield and damaged American destroyer USS Braine, on which 66 men were killed and 78 wounded. On 26 May 1945, a photograph of four young pilots from the 72nd Shinbu Squadron were taken holding a puppy, which later became an iconic kamikaze image. On 15 August 1945, the last six kamikaze pilots were deployed in defiance of Emperor Hirohito's surrender order. In total, 201 kamikaze pilots successfully flew from Bansei Airfield, 170 of these pilots being under 21.

=== Commemoration ===
In 1993, the Bansei Tokkō Peace Museum was built near the site of the former airfield in commemoration of the pilots. In 1984, an Aichi E13A1 "Jake" reconnaissance plane was rediscovered. At the end of the war, it was ditched by the crew at sea, and it was raised in 1992. The aircraft was not flown from Bansei Air Base as it was a Navy aircraft. Today, it is exhibited in the museum. In the beach, there is an annual Fukiage Beach Sand Festival held every May, which is situated on the large sand dune and hosts sand building competitions.

== Units ==
The following units based at Bansei Airfield:

- 144th Shinbu Squadron
- 66th Hiko Sentai (Flying Regiment)
- 55th Hiko Sentai (Flying Regiment)
- 72nd Shinbu Squadron, 25 May 1945

== See also ==
- Bansei Tokkō Peace Museum
- Tachiarai Army Airfield
- Chiran Airfield
