= Tachiarai Army Airfield =

Tachiarai Army Airfield
- Chikuzen, Fukuoka in Japan
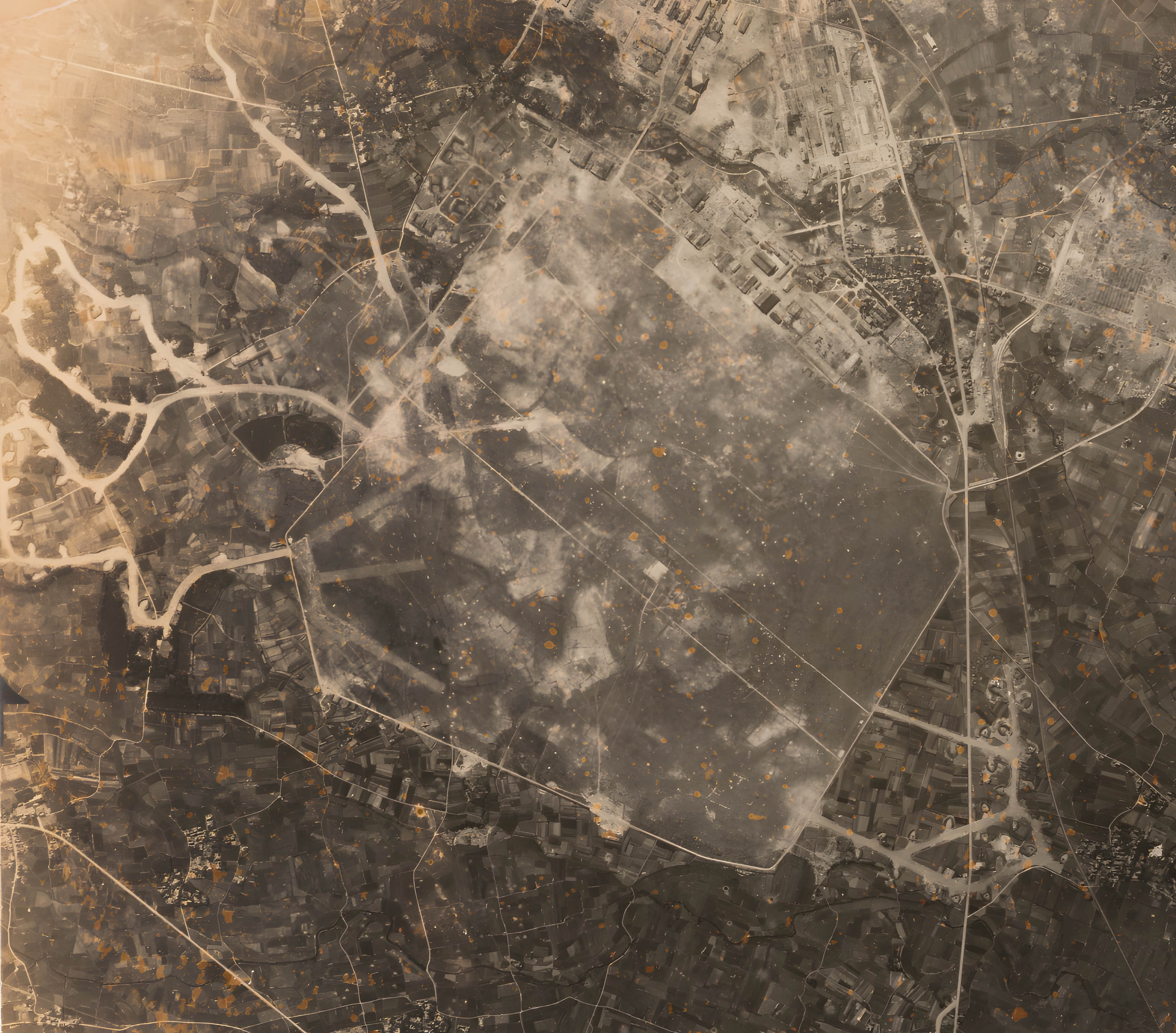
- Aerial photograph of Tachiarai Army Airfield, 1945.

Location
- Shown within Japan
- Coordinates: 33°24′43″N 130°37′10″E

Site history
- Built: 1919
- Built by: Japanese Army
- In use: October 1919 - August 1945
- Fate: Dismantled
- Battles/wars: Pacific War

Tachiarai Army Airfield is a former Imperial Japanese Army aviation base located in the town of Chikuzen, Fukuoka, Japan.

== History ==
Tachiarai Army Airfield was completed in October 1919 by the Japanese Army, and was subsequently used by the Imperial Japanese Army Air Service (IJAAF). From 1929 to 1936, it served commercial aircraft. By 1937, the military facilities that operated in the airfield were expanded. Additional facilities included the headquarters of the flying units, aircraft manufacturing plants, and military engineering schools, totaling to 3.94 million square meters of land.

=== World War II ===
In 1940, the Tachiarai Army Flight School opened, and the airfield became a primary training ground for many kamikaze pilots. The Tachiarai Flight School opened a branch in Chiran Airfield on 24 December, 1941. During this time, Tachiarai Army Airfield was considered to be the largest military airfield in East Asia, serving as a major training base for many IJAAF pilots. It also became an important dispatch point for departing kamikaze pilots. Facilities included a range control bunker for live-fire training with military aircraft, and bunkers. In 1943, the Tachiarai Flight School opened a branch in Metabaru Airfield, when it came operational. Over time, the Tachiarai Army Flying School became the main school for 18 branch campuses across Kyushu, Okayama, Kyoto, and even the Korean Peninsula.

In March 1945, the US Air Force launched two large-scale air raids on the airfield. This resulted in the deaths of approximately 1,000 people, including civilians. Additionally, B-29 bombers accidentally struck a group of 31 school children who were walking home from school, and sought shelter in the Tonta Forest. By April 1945, constant raids by B-29 Bombers had completely destroyed the airfield, and its stationed bomber aircraft were subsequently moved to Mushiroda Airfield. On 25 May, 1945, a direct kamikaze sortie was launched from Tachiarai Army Airfield. Heavily modified Mitsubishi Ki-67 aircraft known as Hiryū ("Flying Dragons") were equipped with specially designed explosive payloads, known as Sakura bombs. On the same day, two aircraft fitted with Sakura bombs and two Nakajima Ki-44 fighters took off on a kamikaze mission. All eight crew members who were involved were killed during this attack. Following the extent of the damages and the end of the war, Tachiarai Army Airfield was abandoned.

=== Legacy ===
In 1987, a local businessman purchased an old railway station and converted it into a museum. It exhibited a Ki-27 Nate, which was recovered from the sea floor of Hakata Bay in 1996 using lifting straps. In 2008, the municipality purchased the museum and relocated it to the opposite side of Japan National Route 500, in front of the old building. In 2009, it was officially reopened as the Tachiarai Peace Memorial Museum, which today exhibits approximately 1800 items from the war. Today, the Tonta Forest is preserved as the Peace Flower Garden in commemoration of the 31 school children.

== Units ==
The following units based at Tachiarai Army Airfield:

- 4th Hiko Sentai (4th Flying Regiment), 1919 to 1930
- 77th Hiko Sentai (77th Flying Regiment), Organized in July 1937, transferred to Fengtian Airfield on 24 July, 1937.
- Tachiarai Army Flight School, 1940 to August 1945

== See also ==
- Tachiarai Peace Memorial Museum
- Bansei Airfield
- Chiran Airfield
