= Ata Shell Mound =

Archaeological site in Japan

Ata shell mound
- 阿多貝塚 (Japanese)
- Ata shell mound Ata Shell Mound (Japan)
- 31°26′56″N 130°19′58″E
- Periods: Jōmon period
- Location: Minamisatsuma, Kagoshima, Japan
- Region: Kyushu

Site notes
- Public access: Yes
- National Historic Site of Japan

The Ata shell mound (阿多貝塚, Ata Kaizuka) is an archaeological site in the Kinpu neighborhood of Minamisatsuma, Kagoshima, Japan, containing an early Jōmon period shell midden. The midden was designated a National Historic Site in 2020.

== Overview ==
During the early to middle Jōmon period (approximately 4000 to 2500 BC), sea levels were five to six meters higher than at present, and the ambient temperature was also 2 °C higher. During this period, the coastal regions of Japan were inhabited by the Jōmon people. The middens associated with such settlements contain bone, botanical material, mollusc shells, sherds, lithics, and other artifacts and ecofacts associated with the now-vanished inhabitants, and these features, provide a useful source into the diets and habits of Jōmon society. Most of these middens are found along the Pacific coast of Japan.

The Ata shell midden is located in the middle of the Satsuma Peninsula. It faces Mt. Kinpu to the east and the East China Sea to the west, and is home to the Fukiage sand dunes stretching about 40 kilometers north-to-south. Inland, low hilly plateaus and alluvial plains extend in layers, formed by small and medium-sized rivers such as the Mase River and the Isaku River. The Ata Shell Mound is located about 3.7 kilometers inland from the present-day coastline of the Tabuse Plain, which is the border between the volcanic ash plateau and the alluvial plain, and is located on a tongue-shaped plateau about 9 meters above sea level protruding to the northwest and a width of about 150 meters. It was excavated in 1978 and was designated a type site for a style of Jōmon pottery, which places the mound in the latter half of the early Jōmon period. The main midden is elliptical in shape, with an area of approximately 600 square meters. The shell layer deposited between a black volcanic ash layer and a yellow volcanic ash layer (Akahoya layer), with the upper layer thicker and containing a mixture of Jōmon and Yayoi pottery and the lower layer containing densely packed oyster and clam shells and only Jōmon pottery. Stone tools include stone arrowheads, stone spoons, stone axes, grinding stones, hammer stones, and of particular note are stone knives made from shale, serpentine-shaped earrings, and flat, stalk-shaped arrowhead-shaped bone and horn tools.

The shells excavated from the shell mound include eight varieties of gastropods and three varieties bivalves, the majority of which are saltwater species.

== See also ==
- List of Historic Sites of Japan (Kagoshima)
