= Bansei Tokkō Peace Museum =

Museum in Kagoshima Prefecture, Japan

- 万世特攻平和祈念館
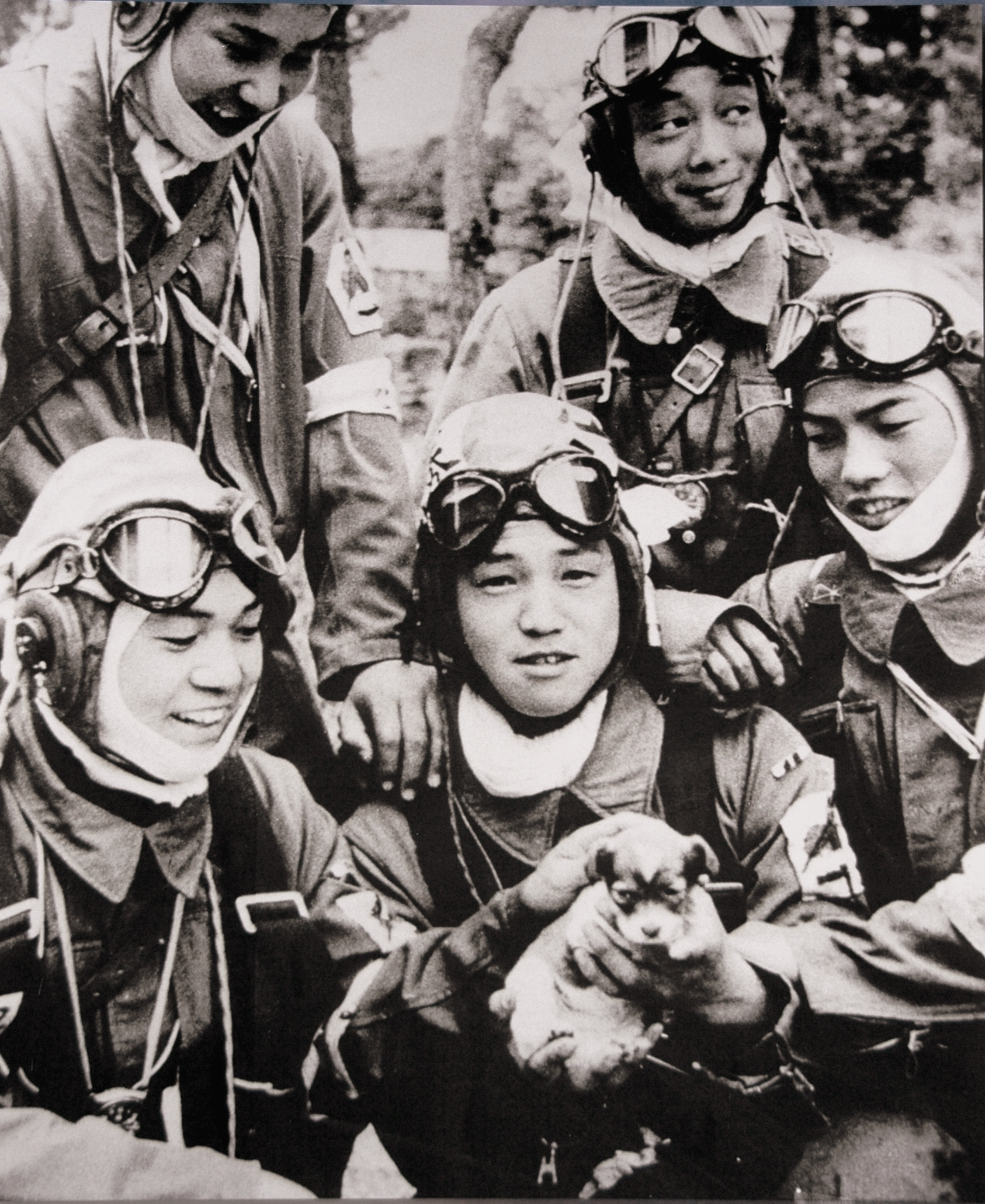
- Airmen from Bansei Air Base before their kamikaze mission taken on May 26, 1945. Clockwise from top left: Kaname Takahashi, Takahashi Mineyoshimi, Takemasha Chida, Yukio Araki, and Tsutomu Hayakama. Araki was the youngest known kamikaze pilot to die in the war.
- Interactive map of the Bansei Tokkō Peace Museum area

General information
- Location: 1955-3 Kasedatakahashi, Minamisatsuma, Kagoshima Prefecture, Japan
- Coordinates: 31°26′14″N 130°17′43″E
- Opened: 1993

Bansei Tokkō Peace Museum (万世特攻平和祈念館, Bansei Tokkō Heiwa Kinenkan) is a war museum in Minamisatsuma, Kagoshima Prefecture. Opened in 1993, the museum commemorates the 201 airmen from the Bansei Air Base (万世飛行場) who died in a kamikaze attack in the final months of the Pacific War. Hichiro Naemura, a flight instructor at the Bansei base in 1945, spearheaded the effort to establish this institution as a memorial to his fallen comrades.

== See also ==
- Kamikaze
- Bansei Airfield
- Chiran Peace Museum for Kamikaze Pilots
- Cornerstone of Peace
