= Tome Torihama =

Japanese restaurateur (1902-1992)

Tome Torihara
- 鳥濱トメ
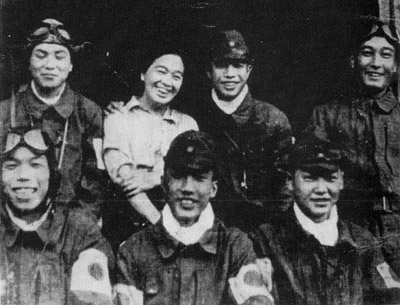
- Torihama with kamikaze pilots c. spring 1945
- Born: June 20, 1902; Chiran, Kagoshima Prefecture, Japan
- Died: April 22, 1992 (aged 89); Chiran, Kagoshima Prefecture, Japan
- Spouse: Yoshkiyo Torihama (married 1920)
- Children: 2

Tome "Tomi" Torihama (鳥濱 トメ) (June 20, 1902 – April 22, 1992）was a Japanese woman who was the owner of a restaurant called "Tomiya Shokudo" in Chiran, Kagoshima that served kamikaze pilots before their final missions. She is called the "Mother of Kamikazes".

== Life and career ==
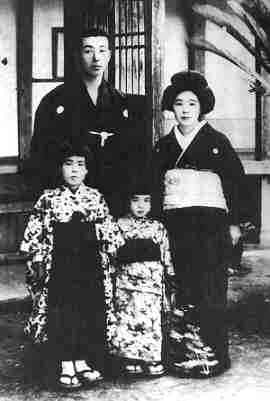
Torihama and her family c. 1920s

Torihama was born in Kagoshima prefecture on June 20, 1902. When she turned 18, she married Yoshkiyo Torihama. They had two daughters, Miyako and Reiko.

In 1929, Torihama opened the Tomiya Shokudo. When the Chiran Airbase opened in 1942, the Tomiya Shokudo became the designated dining hall for the soldiers living on the base. After the Japanese Special Attack Units were formed in 1945, many of the kamikaze pilots would visit Torihama's restaurant. She became close with many of the young pilots, and would send their final letters to their families for them.

After the war ended, the Supreme Commander of Allied Powers requested to patronize Torihama's restaurant, but she refused. However, when the town had a welcome party for the SCAP at the Tomiya Shokudo, Torihama became close with the American soldiers, some of whom called her "Mama-san".

In 1952, Torihama opened the Tomiya Ryokan for family members visiting graves of fallen Japanese soldiers. In 1955, she built a temple dedicated to the soldiers. From its opening in 1975 until her death, Torihama dedicated her life to the Chiran Peace Museum for Kamikaze Pilots.

== Death ==
Torihama died of heart failure in 1992. After her death, many movies, plays, and books were made about her life. There were two monuments erected in her honor, one in 1981 and one in 2007.
