= Chiran Peace Museum for Kamikaze Pilots =

Museum in Kagoshima, Japan

- Chiran Tokkō-Heiwa-Kaikan
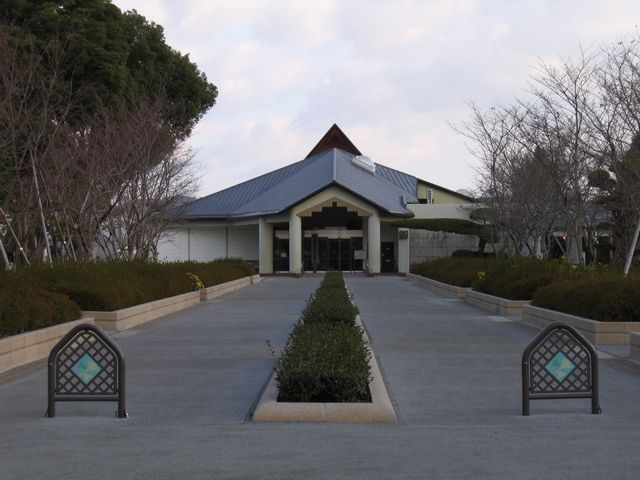

- Location within Japan
- Location: Chiran, Kagoshima
- Coordinates: 31°21′48″N 130°26′04″E
- Type: Aviation museum
- Website: www.chiran-tokkou.jp

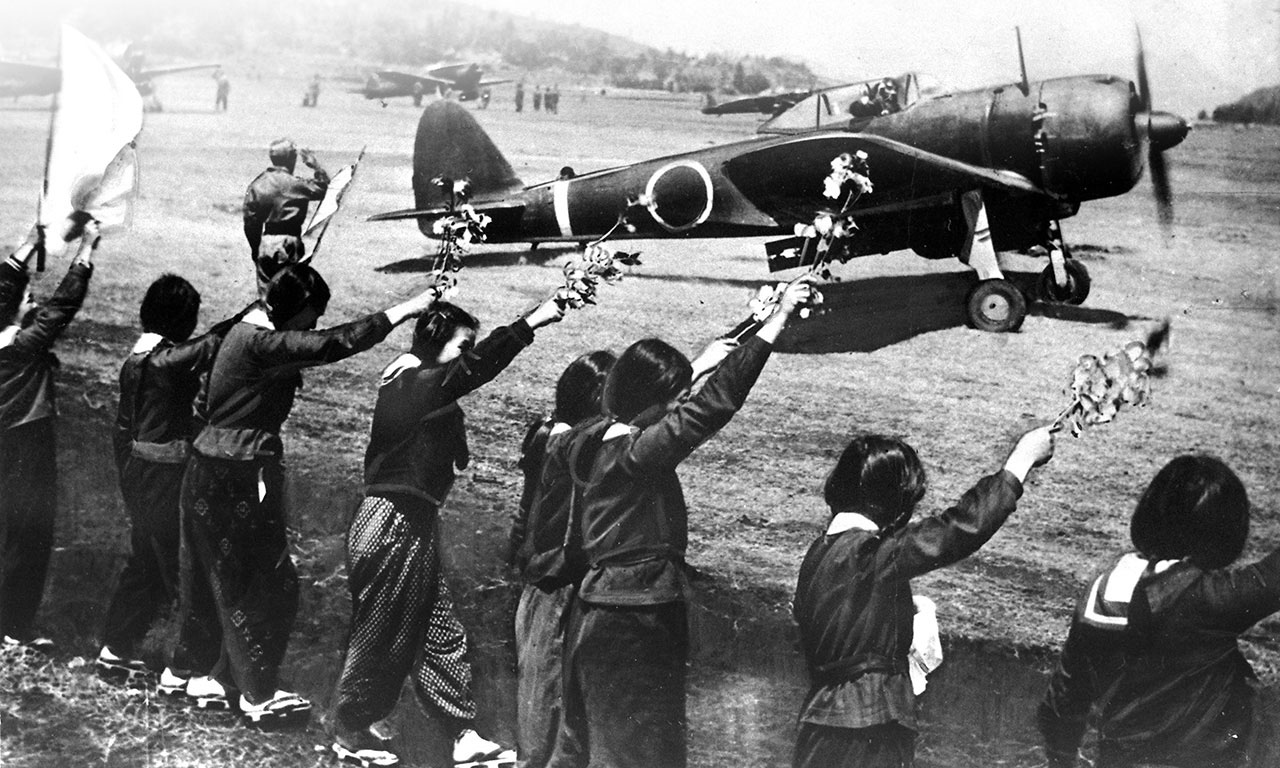
Chiran school girls wave farewell to a departing pilot with branches of cherry blossoms.

The airbase at Chiran, Minamikyūshū, on the Satsuma Peninsula of Kagoshima, Japan, served as the departure point for hundreds of Special Attack or kamikaze sorties launched in the final months of World War II. A peace museum dedicated to the pilots, the Chiran Peace Museum for Kamikaze Pilots (知覧特攻平和会館, Chiran Tokkō-Heiwa-Kaikan), now marks the site.

== Airbase ==
The Chiran Airfield operated by the Imperial Japanese Army at Chiran, Kagoshima, with its two runways, was the principal base of the kamikaze pilots during the Battle of Okinawa. Of the 1,036 army aviators who died in these attacks, 439 were from Chiran. Of the total number, 335 were classed as "young boy pilots" (少年飛行兵).

== Peace Museum ==
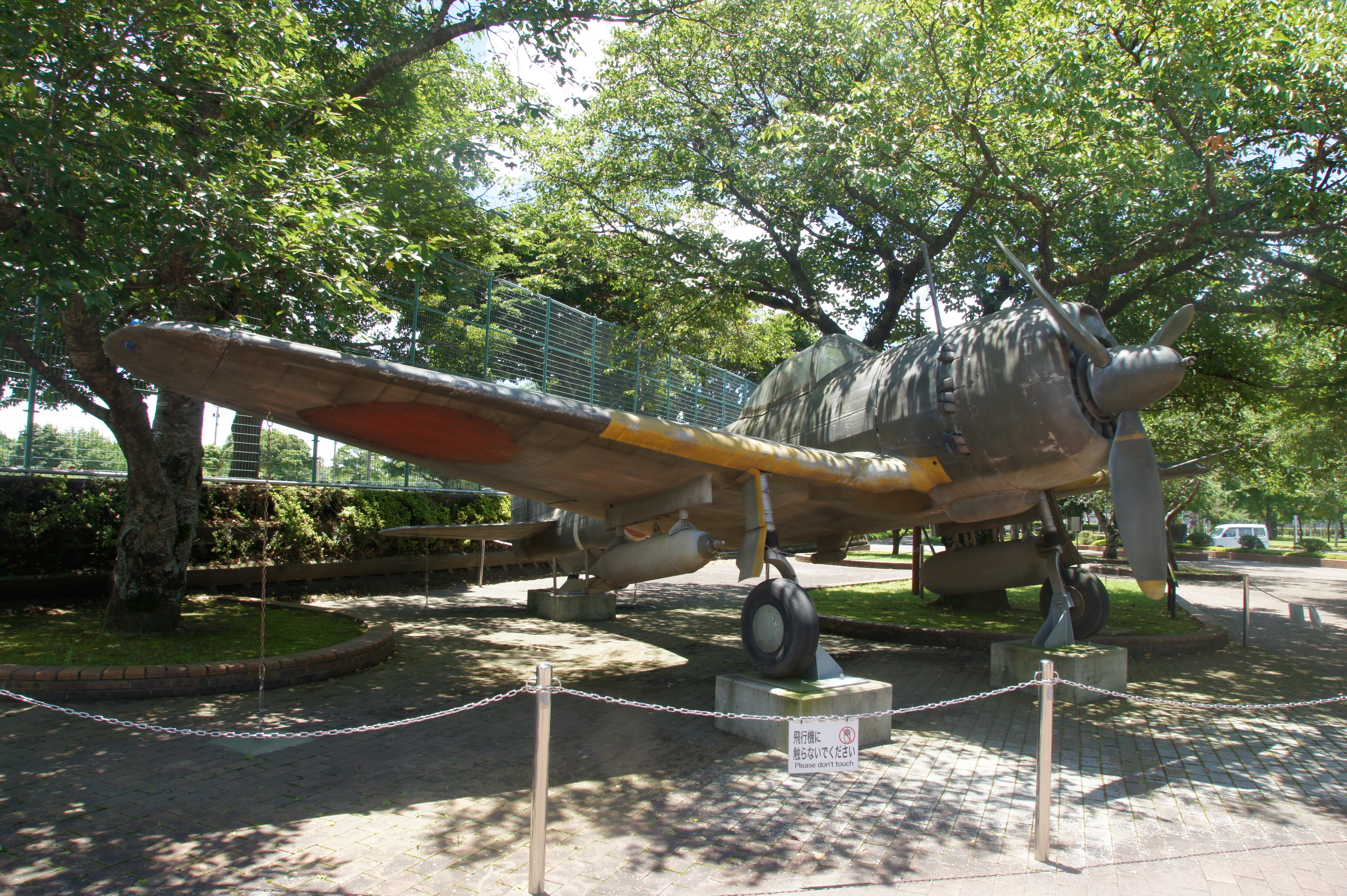
Ki-43 Hayabusa

In 1975 a museum was built to commemorate the lives of the pilots and document their "patriotic efforts for peace". Enlarged in 1985, exhibits include four planes: a Nakajima Ki-43 Hayabusa, a 1943 Kawasaki Ki-61 Hien, a 1944 Nakajima Ki-84 Hayate, and a Mitsubishi Zero recovered from the seabed in 1980. On a personal level, the exhibit includes letters, poems, essays, testaments, and other artefacts; as well as photographs of the 1,036 pilots, arranged in the order in which they died. There is also the grand piano on which two of the pilots played the Moonlight Sonata the night before their final mission.

== Other monuments ==
The Tokkō Kannondō (特攻観音堂) is a temple dedicated to the "Special Attack Goddess of Mercy". The image enshrined within is a 1.8m replica statue of the Yumechigai Kannon (夢違観音 Dream-Changing Kannon), a National Treasure at Hōryū-ji. The names of the kamikaze pilots are written on paper within her womb. It was erected in 1955 thanks to donations collected by Tome Torihama, who ran the Tomiya Inn frequented by the pilots, and who sought to redeem their memory after the war. Stone lanterns dedicated to the pilots line the approach to the museum.

== Anecdotes ==
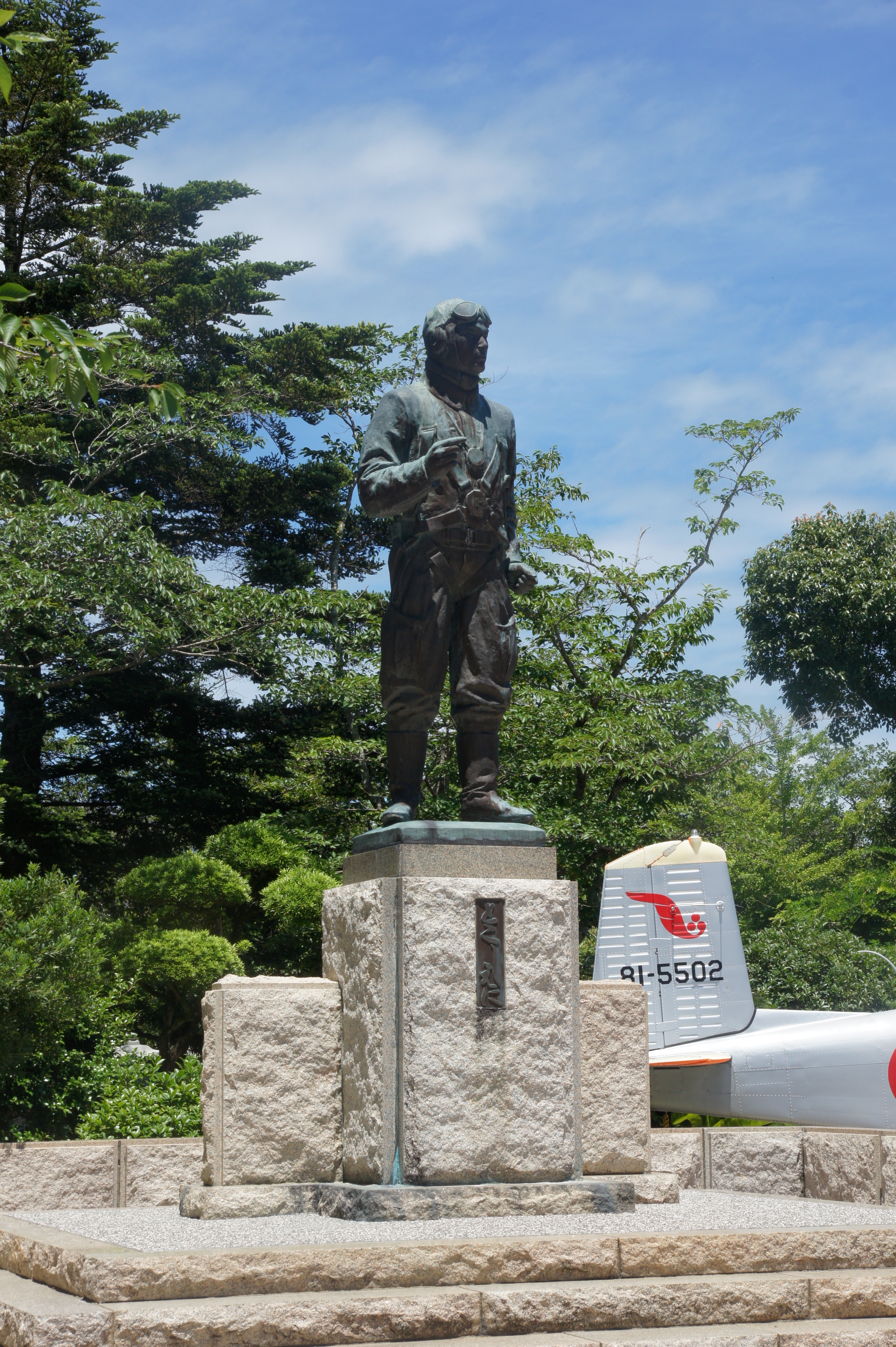
Statue of a Kamikaze pilot

- Second Lieutenant Fujio Wakamatsu wrote: "Mother, I have nothing to say. In my last moment, and my first act of filial piety, I will smile and conquer. With dry eyes and knowing I have done well. Please offer some rice dumplings at our Buddhist mortuary tablet."
- Pilot Hayashi Ichizo wrote in his diary: "I will do a splendid job sinking an enemy aircraft carrier ... I read the Bible every day ... I will sing a hymn as I dive on an enemy vessel."
- Major Hajime Fuji, a training instructor, presented his petition to serve as a kamikaze pilot written in blood; his wife drowned herself and their children so that he should have no conflicting ties.
- After the war, "Two or three American soldiers jumped up on the planes and kicked them with their military boots. They ridiculed the planes with the following scornful words, 'Look! So those kamikaze fellows came against us with these piddling worn-out planes. Did they think they could win with these toys? How stupid!'"

== Film ==
The Firefly (ホタル Hotaru): popular Japanese film of 2001, directed by Yasuo Furuhata and centered around the character of Tome Torihama, who ran the Tomiya Inn in Chiran and treated the young kamikaze pilots as if they were her own sons.

I go to die for you (俺は、君のためにこそ死ににいく Ore wa, kimi no tame ni koso shini ni iku): 2007 film with screenplay by Tokyo Governor Shintaro Ishihara, based on his conversations with Tome Torihama, who died in 1992.

== Reception ==
On 15 August each year, the anniversary of the date on which Emperor Shōwa announced the Japanese surrender, right-wing groups drive through Chiran in trucks blaring nationalist messages and songs. Over the rest of the year, up to a million visitors come to pay tribute to the fallen.

== See also ==
- Chiran Airfield
- Bansei Tokkō Peace Museum
- Tachiarai Peace Memorial Museum
- Japanese nationalism
- Japanese militarism
- Japanese Special Attack Units
- Suicide attack
- Cornerstone of Peace
