= Tachiarai Peace Memorial Museum =

Japanese aviation museum in Chikuzen, Fukuoka

- 筑前町立 大刀洗平和記念館
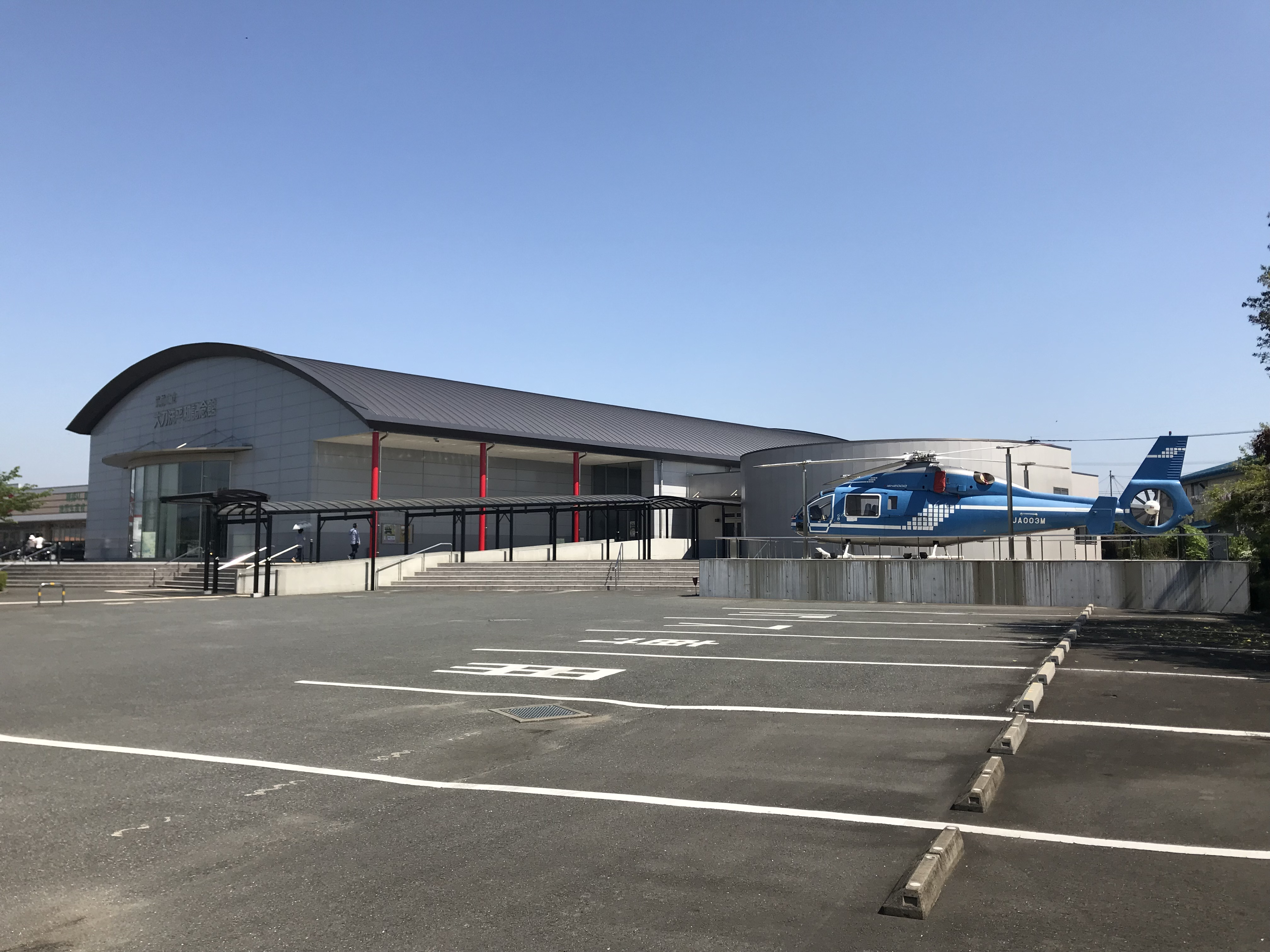
- Tachiarai Peace Memorial Museum

- Tachiarai Peace Memorial Museum Tachiarai Peace Memorial Museum (Japan)
- Established: 1987
- Location: Chikuzen, Fukuoka, Japan
- Coordinates: 33°24′44.4″N 130°37′10.3″E
- Type: Military and war museum
- Website: tachiarai-heiwa.jp

The Tachiarai Peace Memorial Museum (筑前町立 大刀洗平和記念館, Chikuzen chōritsu tachiarai heiwakinenkan) is a historical museum located in the town of Chikuzen, Fukuoka, Japan.

== Overview ==
The Imperial Japanese Army Air Service operated the Tachiarai Army Airfield, which was completed in October 1919. The area between the towns of Chikuzen and Tachiarai ¥ was chosen because it would serve as a relay point for air groups heading for mainland China, and because it was far from the coast and would not be affected by naval gunfire from enemy fleets. The airfield was also used for commercial aircraft from 1929 to 1936. From around 1937, the number of military facilities attached to the airfield increased, and Tachiarai Army Flight School became one of main bases for Army pilot training. In the final stages of World War II, it played a part in the defense of the homeland, including the training of kamikaze pilots, but suffered damage from air raids by the American military. After the end of the war, it was abandoned and the site was converted into farmland and part became the site of the Kirin Beer Fukuoka factory. In 1987, a local businessman purchased a renovated the old station building of Amagi Railway's Tachiarai Station on constructed museum. The prize exhibit was a Nakajima Ki-27 aircraft which had been recovered from Hakata Bay.

The municipality purchased the museum and relocated it on the opposite side of Japan National Route 500 in front of the old building in 2008 and reopened it in 2009 as the Chikuzen Town Tachiarai Peace Memorial Museum. The new structure was designed to resemble an aircraft hangar, and now houses both the Nakajima Ki-27 and a Mitsubishi A6M Zero donated by the Fukuoka Aerospace Association, a group of airplane enthusiasts. The museum also displays approximately 1800 items from the war, including materials from the Tachiarai Air Raid in March 1945.

The museum also has on display a Mitsubishi MH2000 helicopter, and also a full-scale replica of a Kyushu J7W Shinden which was constructed for use in the filming of the 2023 movie Godzilla Minus One.

== Gallery ==
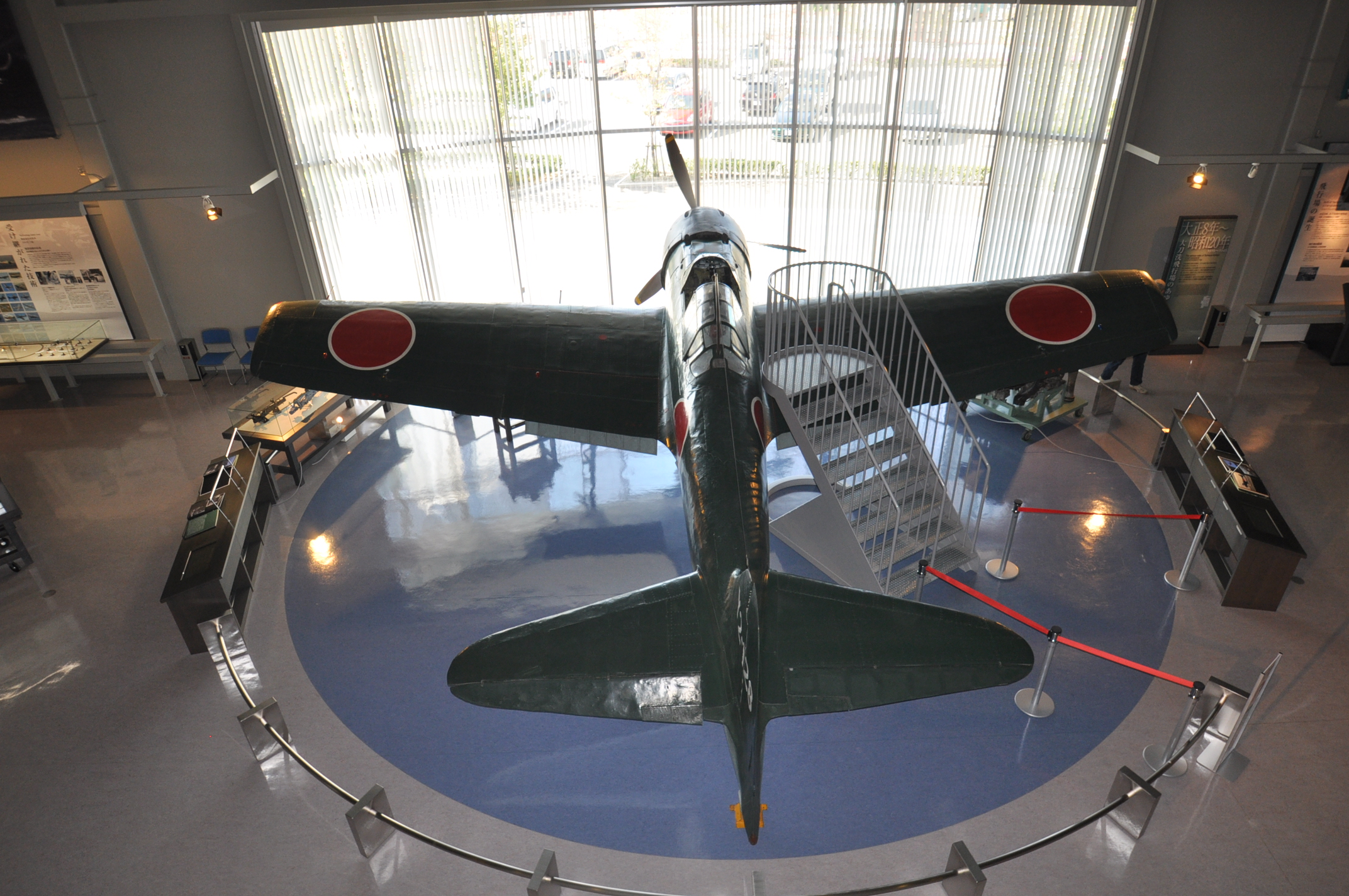
Mitsubishi A6M Zero

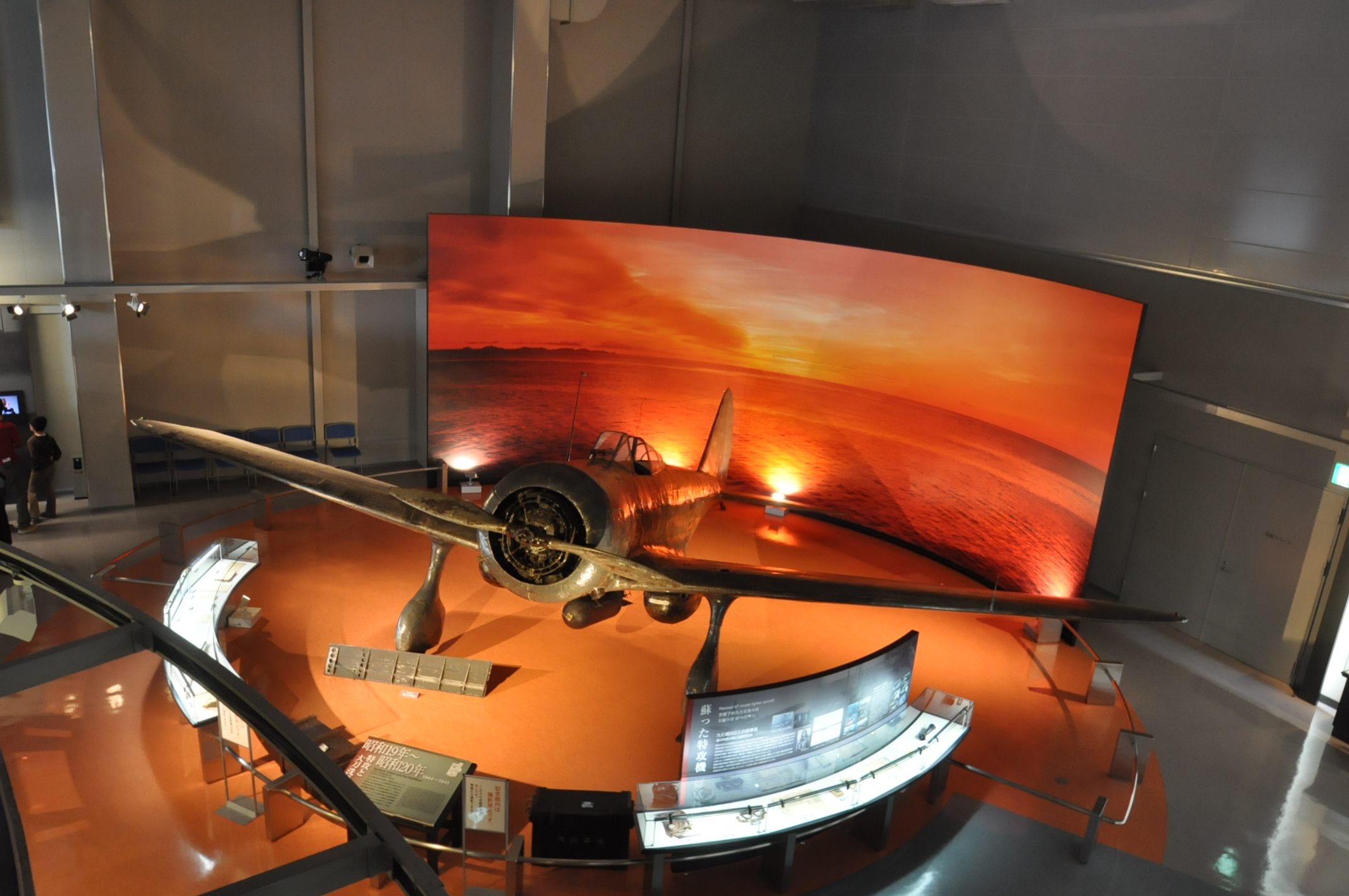
Nakajima Ki-27

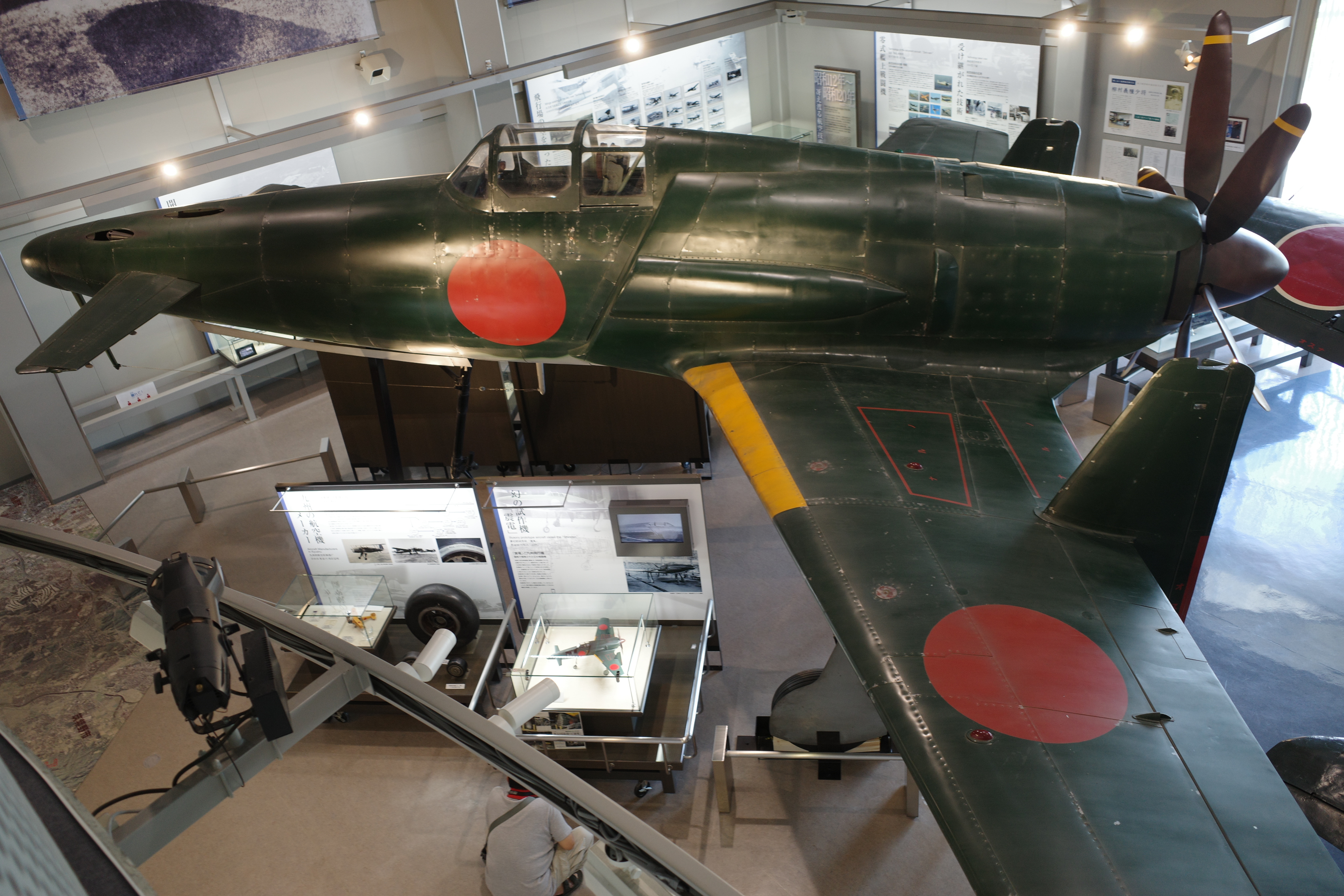
Kyushu J7W Shinden (replica)

== Access ==
The museum is located near Tachiarai Station on the Amagi Railway Amagi Line, approximately one hour from central Fukuoka.

== Aircraft on display ==
- Mitsubishi A6M3 Type 0 Model 32 (the sole surviving Zero of this particular model number, distinguished from other Zero models by its squared-off wings)
- Kyushu J7W Shinden (1:1 scale replica used in the 2023 film Godzilla Minus One)
- Nakajima Ki-27 (the sole surviving aircraft of this type)
- Lockheed T-33

== See also ==
- Tachiarai Army Airfield
- List of aerospace museums
- Chiran Peace Museum for Kamikaze Pilots
