= Mitsubishi MH2000 =

1996 utility helicopter by Mitsubishi

MH2000
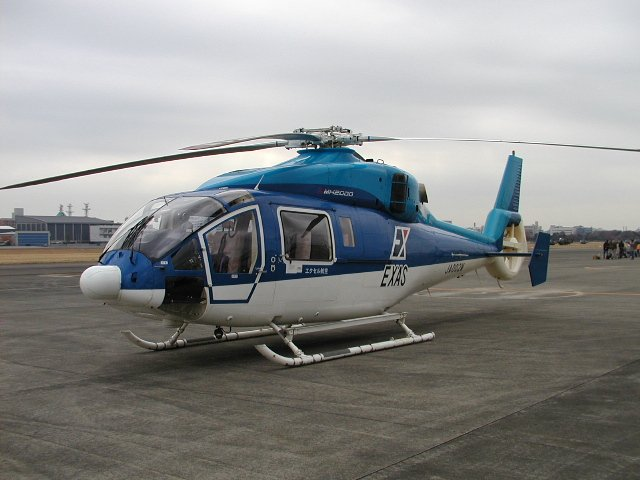
- The Mitsubishi MH2000 of the EXCEL AIR SERVICE.

General information
- Type: Utility helicopter
- National origin: Japan
- Manufacturer: Mitsubishi Heavy Industries
- Primary users: Excel Air Service Japan Aerospace Exploration Agency
- Number built: at least 5

History
- Manufactured: 1996-2004
- Introduction date: 2000
- First flight: 29 July 1996

The Mitsubishi MH 2000 is a 7/12 seat light utility helicopter. The MH2000 was Japan's first indigenous helicopter, and was primarily developed and produced by Mitsubishi Heavy Industries (MHI), which held sole responsibility for developing and manufacturing both the fuselage and engines.

The program was launched in 1995 to fulfill a variety of missions, include passenger and business transport, law enforcement, search and rescue and emergency medical services. The first of four developmental rotorcraft first flew on 29 July 1996, the second flying later that year and the remaining two used for ground testing. The MH2000 had its engine module and dynamic system positioned behind the cabin section to minimize sound levels in the passenger compartment. Power was provided by a pair of Mitsubishi MG5-100 turboshaft engines.

The first production model was delivered on 1 October 2000 to Excel air service in Japan. Following the loss of one prototype due to tail rotor blade separation, the MH2000's type certificate was suspended and a redesign of the tail rotor was undertaken. Delivered rotorcraft were retrofitted with the new rotor while it was intended for all future MH2000s to be delivered with this new tail rotor. In response to a persistent low level of interest in the type, Mitsubishi ultimately decided to halt marketing and production of the MH2000 in September 2004.

== Design and development ==
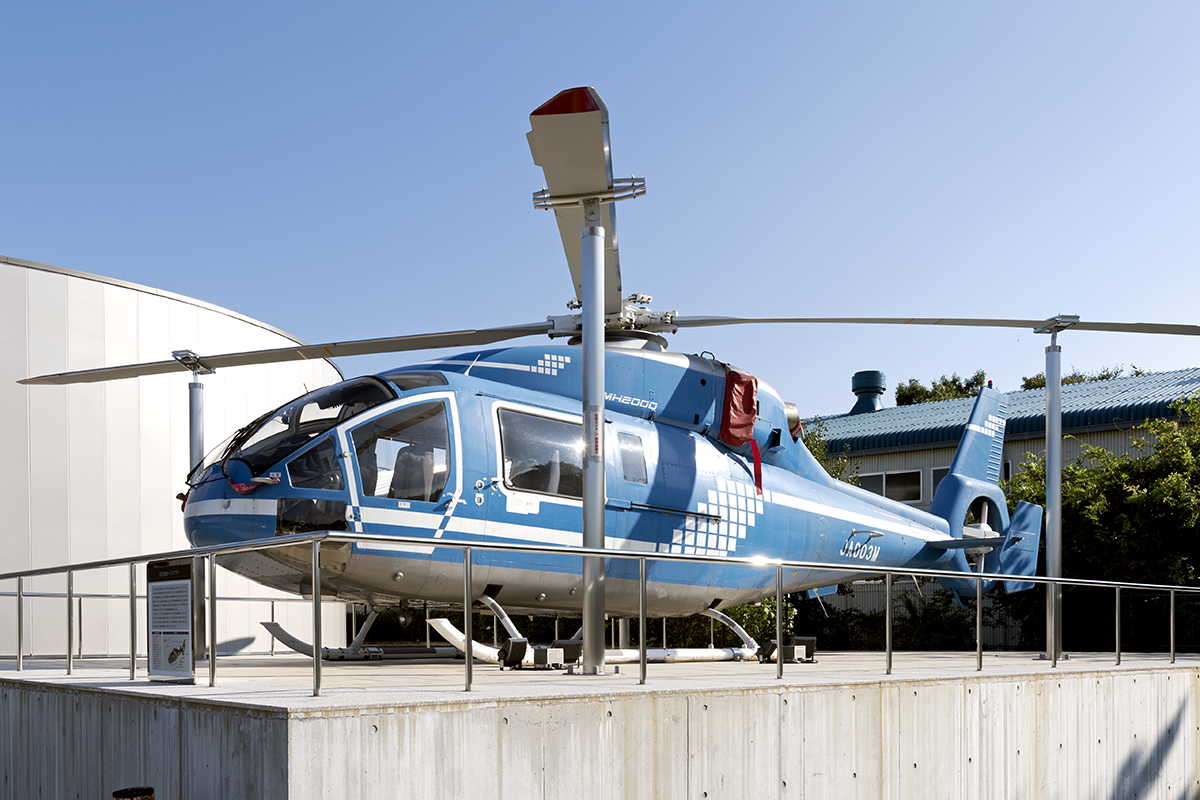
JA003M on display at the Tachiarai Peace Memorial Museum.

Throughout much of the Cold War era, the Japanese conglomerate Mitsubishi Heavy Industries (MHI) engaged in numerous aerospace programmes, which were typically licensed production arrangements on behalf of the Japanese Self Defense Force (JSDF). By the 1990s, MHI was increasingly interested in undertaking independent projects, such as the development of the first indigenously-developed commercial helicopter. Market research undertaken had identified several aspects, including noise, safety, ride quality, and price, that such a rotorcraft ought to demonstrate an operational advantage over existing types in order to bolster demand within the domestic market for commercial helicopters; other factors included the promotion of operational deregulation and the construction of heliports. During July 1992, development of the RP1 prototype commenced as a risk reduction measure, proving the basic technologies for development of the envisioned helicopter, ahead of full-scale development.

In April 1995, development of the MH2000 was formally launched. It is a medium-sized multipurpose helicopter powered by a pair of Mitsubishi's own MG5-110 turboshaft engines. This engine features a single-stage high-pressure centrifugal compressor and is controlled by a dual-channel Full Authority Digital Electronic Control (FADEC); power is delivered through a three stage transmission that possessed a maximum continuous power capacity of 1,250 shp. The MH2000 has an articulated four-bladed main rotor; the rotor blades are of an all-composite construction that comprised both glass fiber and carbon fiber. The main rotor head comprised a titanium hub, composite yokes, elastmeric bearings, and an elastomeric damper. It was decided to adopt a ducted fan tail rotor primarily due to the superior safety to ground personnel provided. The tail fan constituted ten composite blades and an aluminium hub. Safety was bolstered by the MH2000's twin-engine configuration as well as the adoption of a crashworthy design, an automatic flight control system and a map display system. The design of both the FADEC system and rotor blades were shaped by the desire to reduce external noise, while the location of the transmission in the rear of the airframe was influenced by the preference to reduce cabin noise and vibration. For ease of maintenance, all electronic equipment was centralised in a single rear avionics compartment; furthermore, efforts were made to use high reliability components and apparatus.

All of the major dynamic elements, including the rotor and transmission, were produced by MHI, as well as the airframe. Atypically, MHI undertook development not only of the rotorcraft itself but also its propulsion in parallel. Despite this, efforts were made to compress the development timeframe as well as the overall costs of the programme. Accordingly, type certification testing formally commenced in May 1996, which involved a total of two prototypes performing roughly 300 flights and 500 flight hours. On 29 July 1996, one of these prototypes performed the type's maiden flight; the basic type certificate for the MH2000 was issued on 26 June 1997. That same month, type approval of the rotorcraft's engine had also been issued. Following an additional type certification programme to expand the MH2000's operational capabilities, a type certificate amendment was issued on 12 January 1998. During this late 1990s, multiple different methods of vibration minimisation were explored.

By mid-1997, quantity production of the MH2000 commenced; later stage flight testing was performed by both prototype and production-standard rotorcraft, securing approval for additional procedures on the production model in September 1999. During the late 1990s, Mitsubishi publicly stated its ambition to sell 100 MH2000s by 2010, and that each one would have a base unit cost of $3.5million, or 15-20 percent cheaper than competing rotorcraft.

On 1 October 1999, MHI delivered the first example; furthermore, it had manufactured three production standard MH2000s by this point. It was intended for early deliveries to be focused towards the domestic market, and that only after sufficient satisfactory feedback had been gathered would MHI start to market and sell the MK2000 on the international export market. Furthermore, MHI had ambitions to refine the MH2000, including by the adoption of a more comfortable cabin by further reducing both vibration and noise levels, the use of high quality cabin interiors, the adoption on an enhanced autopilot, permitting instrument flight rules operation, a higher cruise speed, and further ease of maintenance measures.

During early 2000, MH2000 business development director Shinichiro Sakamoto stated that the company was holding discussions with the Japanese Ministry of Defense regarding potential military applications for the type; the delivery of an MH2000 to the National Aerospace Laboratory of Japan was also observed. However, in September of that year, Mitsubishi issued a product recall of the MH2000 due to a defective engine cover. Furthermore, a demonstration aircraft crashed during 2000, while complications with the indigenously-developed rotor blade were also identified. During November 2004, it was announced that, in response to a lack of interest from prospective operators, sales efforts for the MH2000 were being discontinued.

== Specifications ==
Data from Blueskyrotor

General characteristics

- Crew: 1 or 2
- Capacity: up to 12 passengers (dependent on configuration), 2,000 kg (4,409 lb) payload
- Length: 12.2 m (40 ft 0 in) 14 m (46 ft) rotors turning
- Width: 3.2 m (10 ft 6 in) (fuselage)
- Height: 4.1 m (13 ft 5 in)
- Empty weight: 2,500 kg (5,512 lb)
- Max takeoff weight: 4,500 kg (9,921 lb)
- Powerplant: 2 × Mitsubishi MG5-110 turboshaft, 597 kW (801 hp) each
- Main rotor diameter: 12.2 m (40 ft 0 in)

Performance

- Cruise speed: 250 km/h (160 mph, 130 kn)
- Never exceed speed: 278 km/h (173 mph, 150 kn)
- Range: 777 km (483 mi, 420 nmi)
- Endurance: 4 hours
- IGE max hovering altitude @ MTOW: 2,700 m (8,858 ft)
