= Kakoinohara Site =

Archaeological site in Japan

- 栫ノ原遺跡 (Japanese)
- Kakoinohara Site Kakoinohara Site (Japan)
- Interactive map of Kakoinohara Site
- 31°25′18″N 130°19′51″E
- Type: settlement
- Periods: Jōmon period
- Location: Minamisatsuma, Kagoshima, Japan
- Region: Kyushu

Site notes
- Public access: Yes (no facilities)

The Kakoinohara Site (栫ノ原遺跡) is an archaeological site with traces of an early Jōmon period settlement, located in the Makishima neighborhood of the city of Minamisatsuma, Kagoshima, Japan. The tumulus was designated a National Historic Site of Japan in 1997.

== Overview ==
This is a complex site located on an isolated hill with an elevation of about 30 meters, in the eastern part of Minamisatsuma city facing the East China Sea on the west side of the Satsuma Peninsula, west of the confluence of the Manose River and the Kaseda River. The site was discovered in 1975 in conjunction with the construction of a school, and a full-scale archaeological excavation was conducted in 1977. After that, a survey of the entire plateau, covering an area of 21,600 square meters, was excavated from 1989 to 1993. Stratigraphy indicated four artifact-bearing layers from the early Jōmon period to the Yayoi period. In addition, some Japanese Paleolithic artifacts have been excavated from the lowest layer. As the hill is a deposit of volcanic ash from Mount Sakurajima on top of a pumice plateau, the age of the site is clearly defined.

Several sites from the early Jōmon period have been confirmed in the southern Kyushu region. It is believed that this region saw a change from the cool, dry climate of the Paleolithic period to the warm and humid climate of the Jōmon period before other regions of Japan, and the sites from the early Jōmon period have a different appearance from other regions. In the Kagoshima region, the Satsuma volcanic ash layer, which erupted from Sakurajima and dates back about 11,500 years ago, is a key layer for determining the age of the period, and the layer directly below this layer shows the transition from the Paleolithic to the Early Jōmon period. Analysis of pollen found at ruins suggests that evergreen broad-leaved forests appeared during the early Jōmon period, and that the climate was warming. At the Kashiwabara ruins, analysis of pollen and charcoal has revealed Queraceae, Lauraceae, Miscanthus, and Sasa gracilis.

On the west side of the site, four stone-arranged hearths, including boat-shaped stone-arranged hearths with long axes of approximately 75-centimeters made of tuff slabs, 22 stone-collecting remains, and eight prehistoric storage pits were discovered. Stone-collecting remains have been confirmed at many other ruins, and consist of dozens of fist-sized pebbles arranged. In these types of remains, the pebbles have turned black or red due to the heat of the flames, and charcoal is usually produced, so they are thought to be remains of cooking over fire. The stone-arranged hearths are made by digging a hole in the ground and arranging slabs of stones vertically or diagonally. They are thought to have a different purpose from ordinary hearths, but the exact purpose is unknown. The s boat-shaped stone hearth is also found at other sites in southern Kyushu dating back to the early Jōmon period. It is a combination of a large oval pit and a small circular pit, connected by a tunnel (chimney). Eight such structures excavated at this site. Judging from its shape, this type of structure is not a normal hearth for cooking. Animal fatty acids, believed to be from wild boars, were found in the pit at this site, reinforcing the view that it was a facility for smoking.

Over 1,000 pieces of Jōmon pottery with raised band patterns, as well as a large number of stone tools including stone arrowheads, stone axes, grinding stones, hammer stones, lithic cores, whetstones, and scrapers. The ground stone axes include ones with a circular cross section and a chisel-shaped blade, similar to stone axes is also found in Southeast Asia and southern China, used to build dugout canoes. As a large amount of carbonized nuts was found in a storage pit from the early Jōmon period and the many grinding stones and stone plates used for flour milling were found among the stone tools, indicating that facilities and tools for a permanent settlement had been developed; however, the lack of any evidence of pit dwellings does not preclude that the inhabitants were still not at least partly nomadic.

== See also ==
- List of Historic Sites of Japan (Kagoshima)
