= Minamisatsuma =

Minamisatsuma 南さつま市
- City
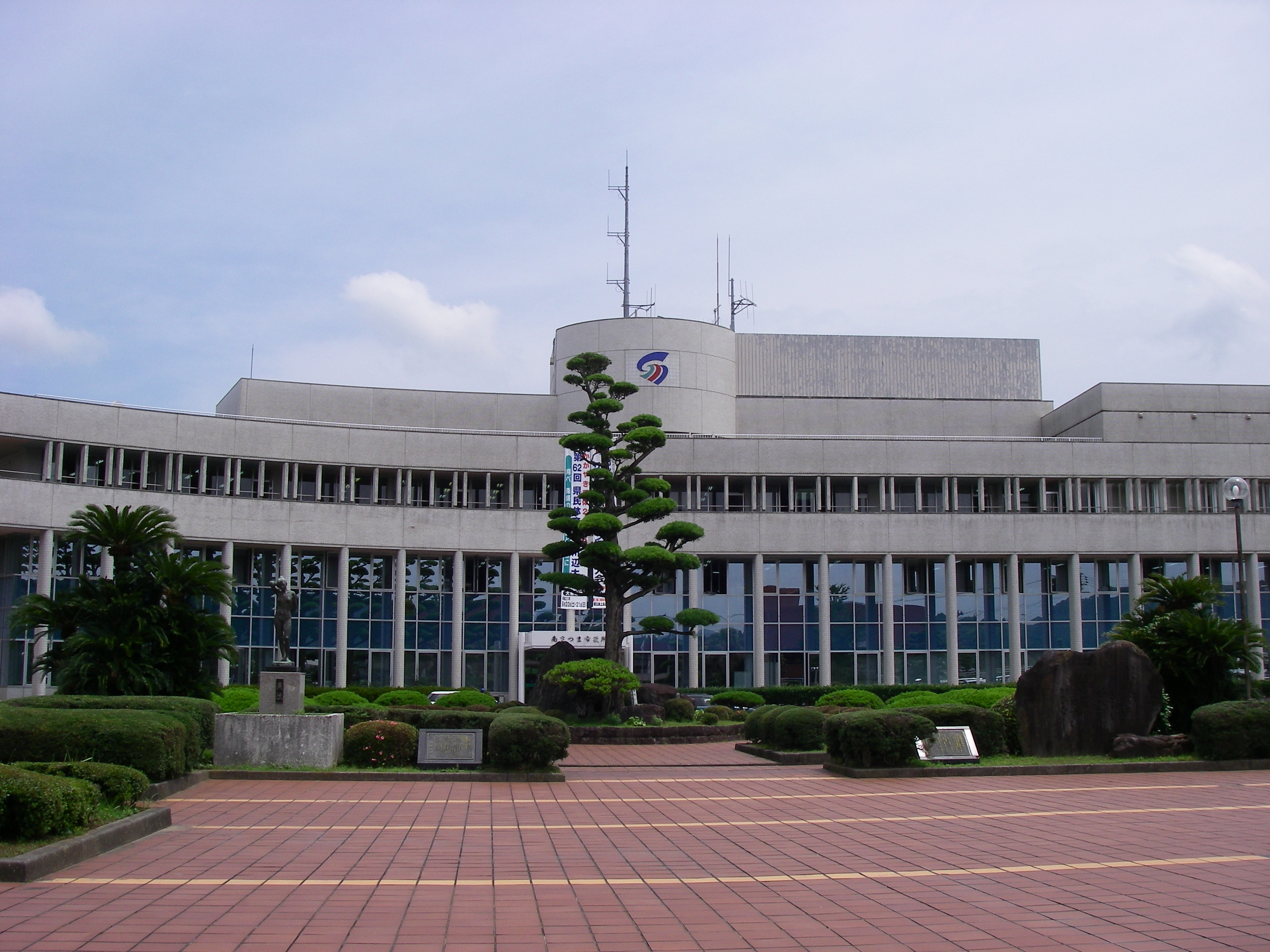
- Minamisatsuma City Hall

- Flag Emblem
- Interactive map of Minamisatsuma
- Location in Japan
- Coordinates: 31°25′00″N 130°19′24″E
- Country: Japan
- Region: Kyushu
- Prefecture: Kagoshima
- As city settled for Kaseda: July 15, 1954
- Current city name changed for: November 7, 2005

Government
  - Mayor: Teruo Honbo (since November 2009)

Area
  - Total: 283.59 km^{2} (109.49 sq mi)

Population (June 30, 2024)
  - Total: 31,397
  - Density: 110.71/km^{2} (286.74/sq mi)
- Time zone: UTC+09:00 (JST)
- City hall address: 2648 Kaseda Kawabata, Minamisatsuma-shi, Kagoshima-ken 897-8501
- Climate: Cfa
- Website: Official website
- Symbols
- Flower: Farfugium japonicum
- Tree: Podocarpus macrophyllus

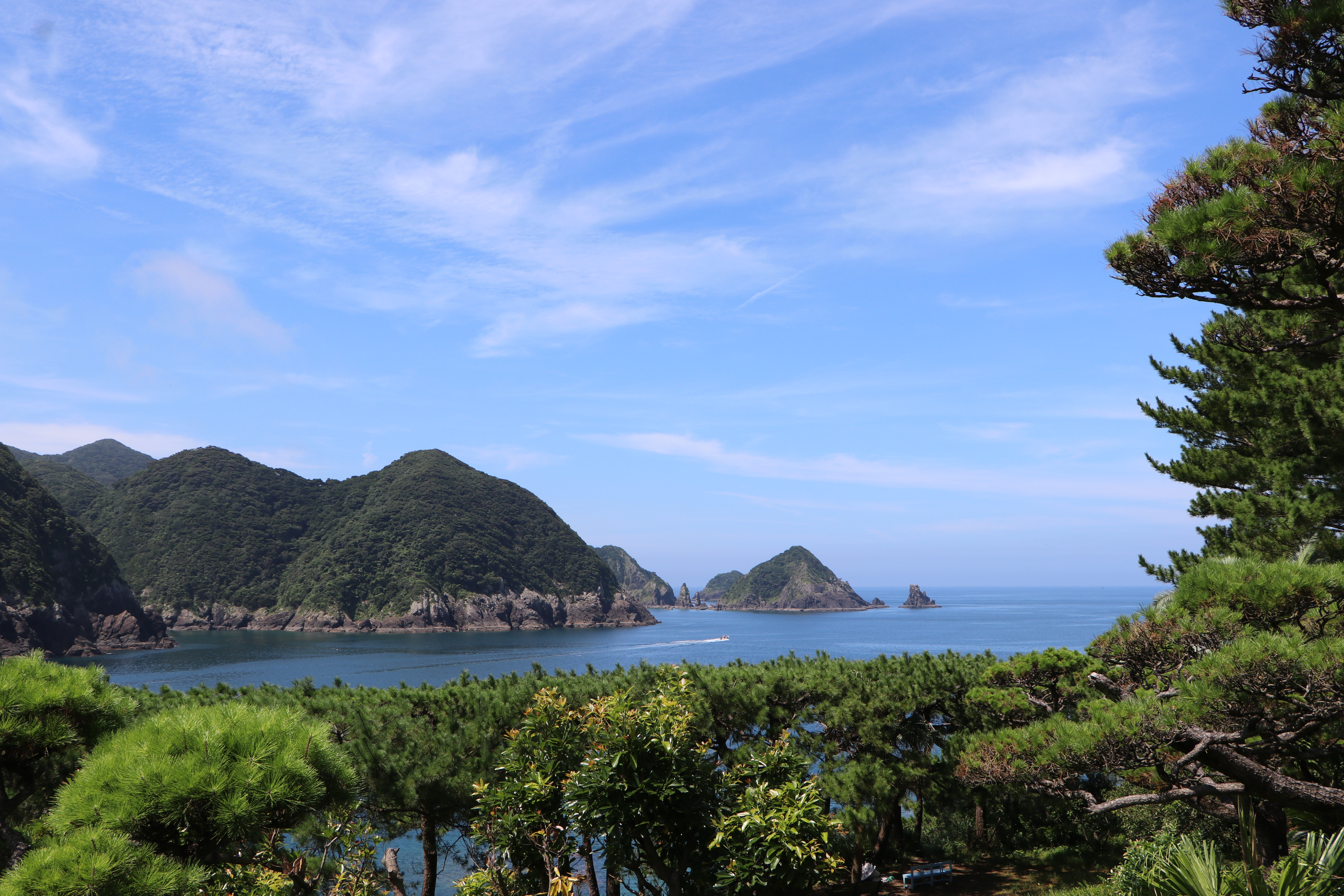
Bonotsu coast from Kishinkan

Minamisatsuma (南さつま市, Minamisatsuma-shi) is a city located in Kagoshima Prefecture, Japan. As of 30 June 2024, the city had an estimated population of 31,397 in 16,779 households, and a population density of 110 persons per km^{2}. The total area of the city is 283.59 km^{2} (109.49 sq mi).

== Geography ==
Minamisatsuma is located at the southwestern tip of the Satsuma Peninsula, and faces the East China Sea. In the northwest of the city is Fukiagehama, one of the three largest sand dune areas in Japan, and in the southwest is a ria coast which is designated as a national scenic spot. Off the coast of the East China Sea are the uninhabited Uji Islands and Kusakaki Islands, which are within the city borders.

== Surrounding municipalities ==
Kagoshima Prefecture

- Hioki
- Kagoshima
- Makurazaki
- Minamikyūshū

=== Climate ===
Minamisatsuma has a humid subtropical climate (Köppen climate classification Cfa) with hot summers and mild winters. Precipitation is significant throughout the year, and is heavier in summer, especially in June and July. The average annual temperature in Minamisatsuma is 18.0 °C (64.4 °F). The average annual rainfall is 2,454.0 mm (96.61 in) with June as the wettest month. The temperatures are highest on average in August, at around 27.9 °C (82.2 °F), and lowest in January, at around 8.3 °C (46.9 °F). Its record high is 36.4 °C (97.5 °F), reached on 14 August 2024, and its record low is −4.6 °C (23.7 °F), reached on 11 February 1996.

Climate data for Kaseda, Minamisatsuma (1991−2020 normals, extremes 1977−present)
Month	Jan	Feb	Mar	Apr	May	Jun	Jul	Aug	Sep	Oct	Nov	Dec	Year
Record high °C (°F)	22.7 (72.9)	23.9 (75.0)	26.8 (80.2)	28.8 (83.8)	31.6 (88.9)	34.7 (94.5)	35.9 (96.6)	36.4 (97.5)	35.2 (95.4)	33.3 (91.9)	28.8 (83.8)	24.9 (76.8)	36.4 (97.5)
Mean daily maximum °C (°F)	12.7 (54.9)	13.9 (57.0)	16.9 (62.4)	21.0 (69.8)	24.8 (76.6)	27.4 (81.3)	31.3 (88.3)	32.3 (90.1)	29.8 (85.6)	25.5 (77.9)	20.4 (68.7)	15.1 (59.2)	22.6 (72.7)
Daily mean °C (°F)	8.3 (46.9)	9.3 (48.7)	12.2 (54.0)	16.3 (61.3)	20.1 (68.2)	23.5 (74.3)	27.3 (81.1)	27.9 (82.2)	25.1 (77.2)	20.3 (68.5)	15.1 (59.2)	10.2 (50.4)	18.0 (64.3)
Mean daily minimum °C (°F)	3.8 (38.8)	4.4 (39.9)	7.3 (45.1)	11.4 (52.5)	15.6 (60.1)	20.2 (68.4)	24.0 (75.2)	24.3 (75.7)	21.3 (70.3)	15.6 (60.1)	10.1 (50.2)	5.3 (41.5)	13.6 (56.5)
Record low °C (°F)	−4.2 (24.4)	−4.6 (23.7)	−1.8 (28.8)	0.2 (32.4)	6.5 (43.7)	11.7 (53.1)	16.7 (62.1)	17.6 (63.7)	11.4 (52.5)	4.8 (40.6)	0.4 (32.7)	−3.8 (25.2)	−4.6 (23.7)
Average precipitation mm (inches)	93.2 (3.67)	118.7 (4.67)	167.0 (6.57)	195.4 (7.69)	189.6 (7.46)	514.2 (20.24)	337.3 (13.28)	219.9 (8.66)	276.3 (10.88)	104.8 (4.13)	127.2 (5.01)	110.5 (4.35)	2,454 (96.61)
Average precipitation days (≥ 1.0 mm)	11.2	10.5	13.2	10.7	9.9	15.4	11.5	10.8	10.5	8.0	9.2	10.2	131.1
Mean monthly sunshine hours	96.5	111.2	148.7	165.6	166.6	99.1	172.7	198.8	162.7	174.4	135.8	110.2	1,742.3
Source: Japan Meteorological Agency

== Demographics ==
Per Japanese census data, the population of Minamisatsuma in 2020 is 32,887 people. Minamisatsuma has been conducting censuses since 1920. The city's population peaked in 1945 at more than 90,000 people; the city's population has steadily declined since then. Until 2020, the city's population is still showing no signs of picking up.

Historical population
Year	Pop.	±%
1920	68,929	—
1925	70,176	+1.8%
1930	73,456	+4.7%
1935	71,758	−2.3%
1940	70,592	−1.6%
1945	90,328	+28.0%
1950	89,852	−0.5%
1955	85,625	−4.7%
1960	78,091	−8.8%
1965	69,206	−11.4%
1970	59,584	−13.9%
1975	54,759	−8.1%
1980	52,604	−3.9%
1985	50,871	−3.3%
1990	48,113	−5.4%
1995	45,845	−4.7%
2000	43,979	−4.1%
2005	41,677	−5.2%
2010	38,706	−7.1%
2015	35,439	−8.4%
2020	32,887	−7.2%
Minamisatsuma population statistics

== History ==
Minamisatsuma is part of ancient Satsuma Province and was part of the holdings of Satsuma Domain in the Edo period. The villages of Kaseda, Higashikaseda, Nishikaseda, and Seinangata in Kawabe District and Ata and Tabuse in Ata District were established on April 1, 1889 with the creation of the modern municipalities system. Kaseda was raised to town status on January 1, 1924. Higashikaseda became the town of Mansei on January 1, 1925. Nishikaseda (which had been renamed Kasasa in 1923) became the town Kasasa on November 10, 1940. It subsequent separated into Kasas and Oura towns on April 1, 1951. Kaseda and Mansei merged to form the city of Kaseda on July 15, 1954. Seinangata (which had been renamed Bozu in 1953) became the town of Bozu on November 1, 1955. Ata and Tabuse merged to form the town on Kinpo on September 30, 1956.

The city of Minamisatsuma was established on November 7, 2005, from the merger of the city of Kaseda, with the town of Kinpō (from Hioki District), and the towns of Bonotsu, Kasasa and Ōura (all from Kawanabe District).

=== Kaseda ===
Kaseda (加世田市, Kaseda-shi) was a city located in Kagoshima Prefecture, Japan. The city was founded on July 15, 1954. As of 2003, the city had an estimated population of 23,740 and the density of 251.56 persons per km^{2}. The total area was 94.37 km^{2}. On November 7, 2005, Kaseda, was merged to create Minamisatsuma and no longer exists as an independent municipality.

=== Kinpō ===
Kinpō (金峰町, Kinpō-chō) was a town located in Hioki District, Kagoshima Prefecture, Japan. As of 2003, the town had an estimated population of 8,099 and the density of 112.10 persons per km^{2}. The total area was 72.25 km^{2}. On November 7, 2005, Kinpō, was merged to create Minamisatsuma and no longer exists as an independent municipality.

=== Bonotsu ===
Bōnotsu (坊津町, Bōnotsu-chō) was a town located in Kawanabe District, Kagoshima Prefecture, Japan. As of 2003, the town had an estimated population of 4,387 and the density of 113.62 persons per km^{2}. The total area was 38.61 km^{2}. On November 7, 2005, Bōnotsu, was merged to create Minamisatsuma and no longer exists as an independent municipality.

=== Kasasa ===
Kasasa (笠沙町, Kasasa-chō) was a town located in Kawanabe District, Kagoshima Prefecture, Japan. As of 2003, the town had an estimated population of 3,585 and the density of 89.89 persons per km^{2}. The total area was 39.88 km^{2}. On November 7, 2005, Kasasa, was merged to create Minamisatsuma and no longer exists as an independent municipality.

=== Ōura ===
Ōura (大浦町, Ōura-chō) was a town located in Kawanabe District, Kagoshima Prefecture, Japan. As of 2003, the town had an estimated population of 2,802 and the density of 73.37 persons per km^{2}. The total area was 38.19 km^{2}. On November 7, 2005, Ōura, was merged to create Minamisatsuma and no longer exists as an independent municipality.

== Government ==
Minamisatsuma has a mayor-council form of government with a directly elected mayor and a unicameral city council of 17 members. Minamisatsuma contributes one member to the Kagoshima Prefectural Assembly. In terms of national politics, the city is part of the Kagoshima 2nd district of the lower house of the Diet of Japan.

== Economy ==
Minamisatsuma has a rural economy based on agriculture and commercial fishing.

== Education ==
Minamisatsuma has ten public elementary schools, three public junior high schools and two combined public elementary/junior schools operated by the city government, and two public high schools operated by the Kagoshima Prefectural Board of Education. There is also one private combined high school.

== Transportation ==
=== Railways ===
Following the closure of the Nansatsu Makurazaki Line in 1984, the city has been without passenger railway service. The nearest train stations are Taniyama Station or Makurazaki Station on the JR Kyushu Ibusuki Makurazaki Line, or Ijūin Station on the Kagoshima Main Line.

=== Highways ===
- Minamikyushu Expressway
- National Route 226
- National Route 270

== Sister cities ==
- Cijin District, Kaohsiung, Taiwan, friendship city since 2023

== Local attractions ==
- Ata Shell Mound, National Historic Site
- Bansei Tokkō Peace Museum is located in the Kawanabe neighborhood
- Kakinohara Site, National Historic Site
