= Chiran Airfield =

Chiran Airfield
- 知覧飛行場
- Chiran, Minamikyūshū in Japan
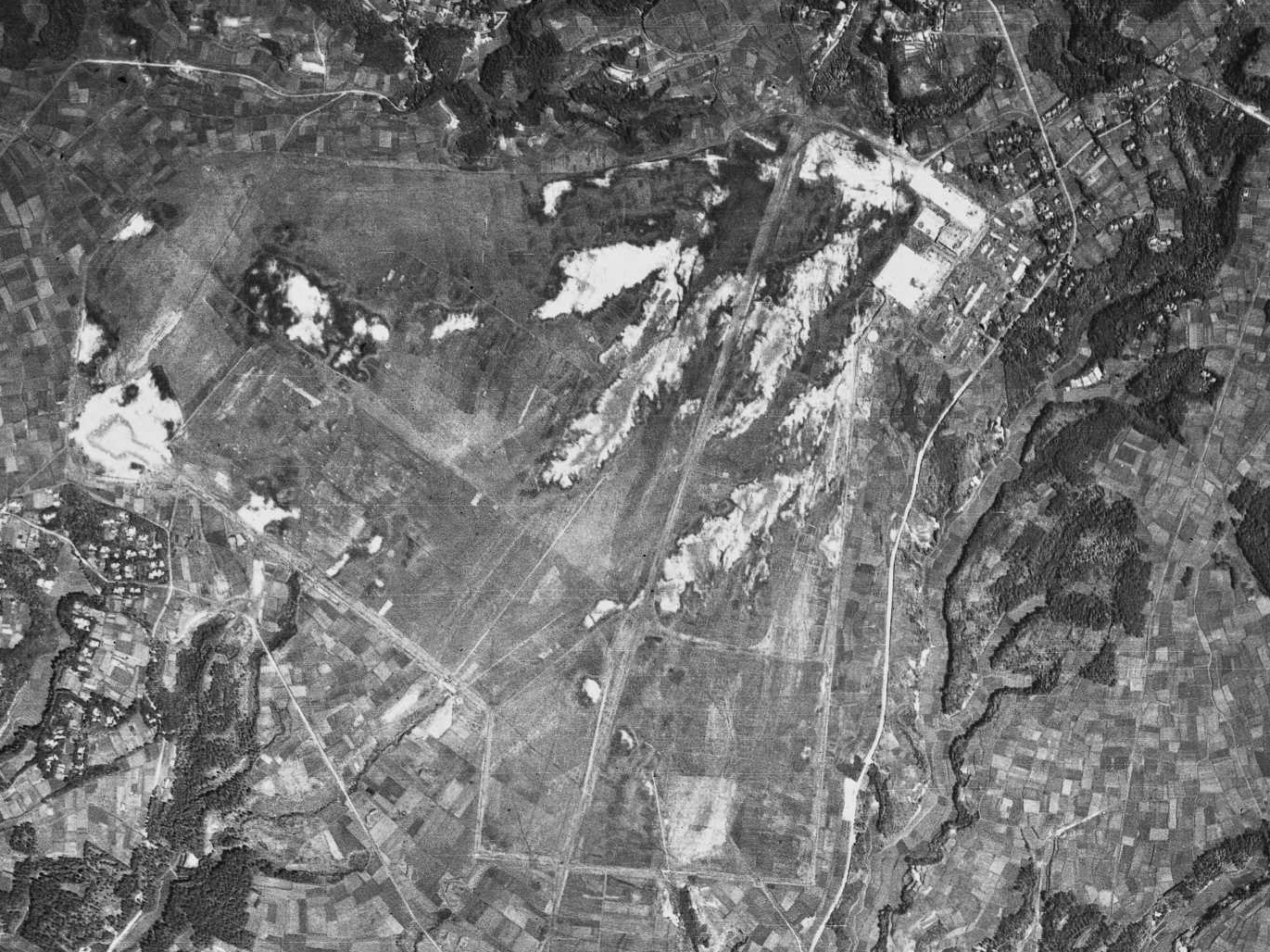
- Remains of Chiran Airfield in 1947.

Location
- Shown within Japan
- Coordinates: 31°21′50″N 130°26′04″E

Site history
- Built: 1941
- Built by: Japanese Army
- In use: December 1941 - 1945
- Fate: Dismantled
- Battles/wars: Pacific War

Chiran Airfield is an abandoned military airfield located in Chiran, Minamikyūshū, on the Satsuma Peninsula of Kagoshima, Japan. It was established in December 1941, and mainly served as training base for Kamikaze pilots. Today, the Chiran Peace Museum for Kamikaze Pilots exists on the site of the former airfield.

== History ==
In December 1941, Chiran Airfield was established as a military airfield, with the purpose of training aviation personnel. In order to facilitate the need of air operations against the Chinese, Americans, British and Dutch, preparations were done in Chiran Airfield. This included the establishment of Tachiarai Army Flight Training School Chiran Branch on 24 December, 1941, for flight training operations. In 1942, it became the site for the Tachiarai Joint Service Flight Training School. As the war progressed and worsened, the facilities at Chiran Airfield were expanded, including the runway, construction of revetments, and taxiways. By mid-1944, Chiran Airfield was mainly used for kamikaze flight training, and approximately 600 pilots had been trained in the 3 year span.

=== Okinawa Campaign ===
During the Okinawa campaign in April 1945, Chiran Airfield was used for kamikaze missions against Okinawa. The airfield continued as a training base until 26 March 1945, when it primarily operated kamikaze missions. In total, 439 flew from Giran Airfield, and 335 of the total number were young pilots. The campaign resulted in the sinking of 56 ships, 107 heavily damaged, and 300 damaged. Following this, from March to June 1945, the United States Air Force launched attack missions against the airfield.

== Legacy ==
In 1975, the Chiran Peace Museum for Kamikaze Pilots was established to commemorate the lives of the pilots. It was enlarged in 1985 and exhibits four planes: a Nakajima Ki-43 Hayabusa, a 1943 Kawasaki Ki-61 Hien, a 1944 Nakajima Ki-84 Hayate, and a Mitsubishi Zero recovered from the seabed in 1980.
