= Minamimorokata District, Kagoshima =

Former district in Kagoshima prefecture, Japan

Minamimorokata (南諸県郡, Minamimorokata-gun) was a historical district of Japan located in Kagoshima Prefecture. In 1883, when Miyazaki Prefecture was split from Kagoshima Prefecture, the district was formed when Morokata District was split between two prefectures. The area in Miyazaki Prefecture became Kitamorokata District, and the area in Kagoshima Prefecture became Minamimorokata. The district was originally part of Hyuga Province. Their language is mostly related to the Morokata dialect and their accent is the United accent which is spoken in Miyakonojō.

== Timeline ==
Until the abolition of the Han system, the district was Morokata District in Hyuga Province.

- November 14, 1871 Miyakonojō Prefecture was formed (Morokata District, Miyakonojō Prefecture).
- January 15, 1873 Miyakonojō and Mimitsu Prefectures merged to form Miyazaki Prefecture (Morokata District, Miyazaki Prefecture).
- August 21, 1876 Miyazaki Prefecture merged into Kagoshima Prefecture (Morokata District, Kagoshima Prefecture).
- May 9, 1883 Miyazaki Prefecture reestablished, splitting Morokata District into Kitamorokata District, Miyazaki Prefecture and Minamimorokata District, Kagoshima Prefecture.
- April 1, 1897 Merged with Higashisoo District to form Soo District and merged into Ōsumi Province.

== Municipalities within the district ==
- Higashishibushi (became the town of Shibushi, now the city of Shibushi)
- Nishishibushi (became Ariake, now part of Shibushi)
- Tsukino (currently Tsukino, Ōsumi, city of Soo)
- Matsuyama (became Matsuyama, now part of Shibushi)
- Ōsaki (currently the town of Ōsaki)
  - Nogata (currently Nogata, Ōsaki; Aratani, Ōsumi, Soo; Yamashige, Ariake, Shibushi)

== See also ==
- List of dissolved districts of Japan
