= List of cities in Kagoshima Prefecture by population =

The following list sorts all cities (including towns and villages) in the Japanese prefecture of Kagoshima with a population of more than 10,000 according to the 2020 Census. As of October 1, 2020, 24 places fulfill this criterion and are listed here. This list refers only to the population of individual cities, towns and villages within their defined limits, which does not include other municipalities or suburban areas within urban agglomerations.

== List ==
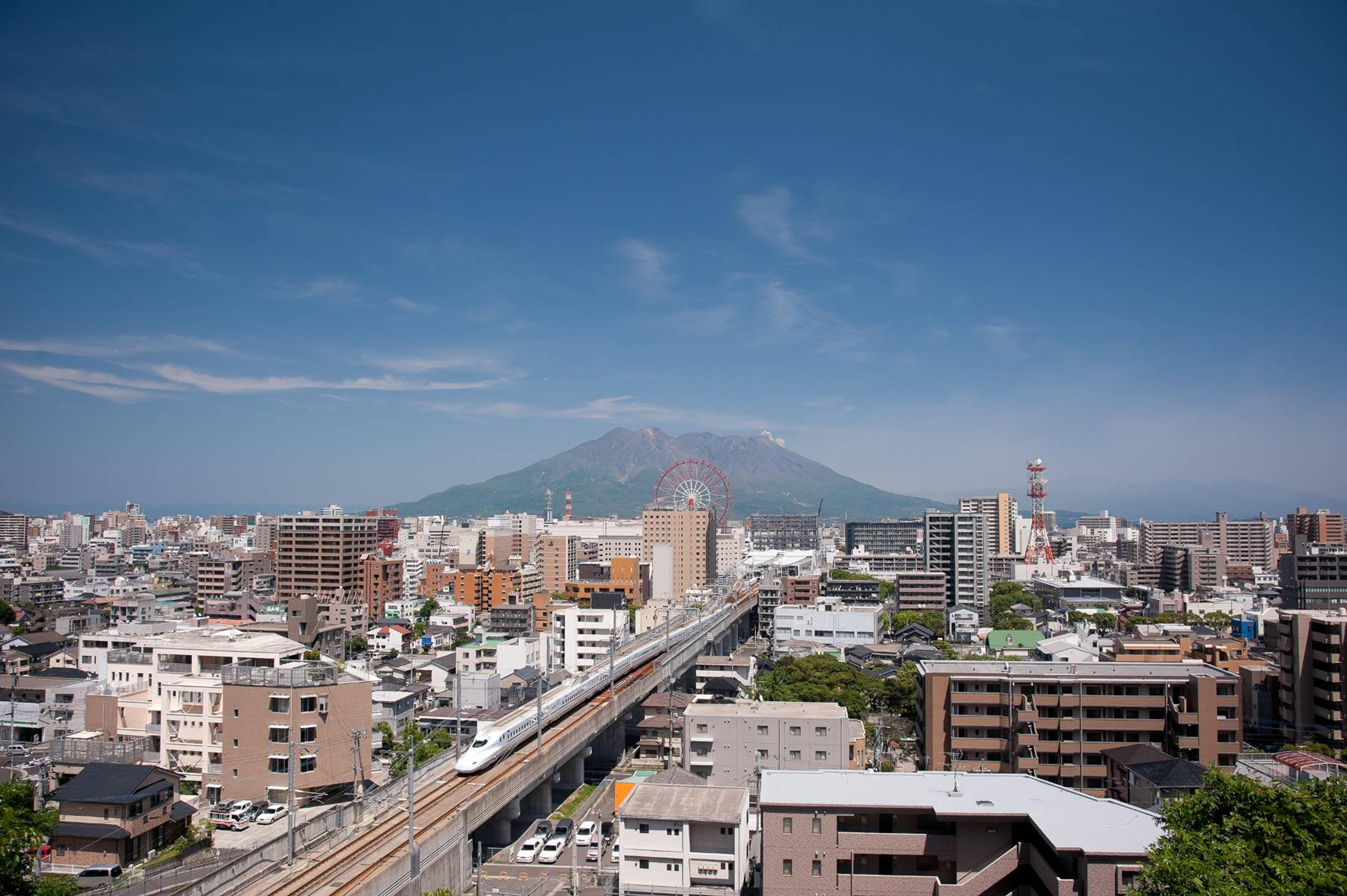
Kagoshima

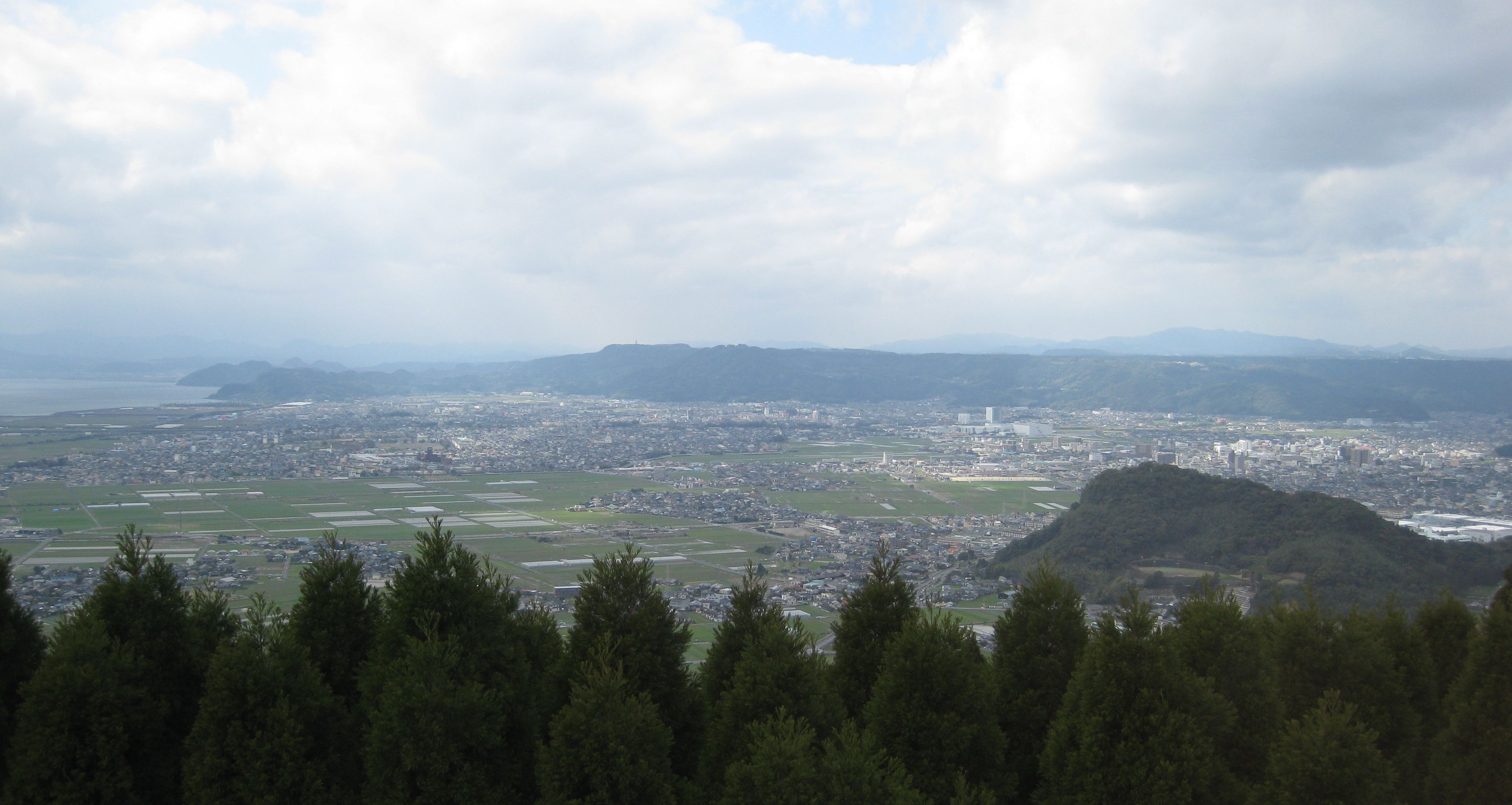
Kirishima

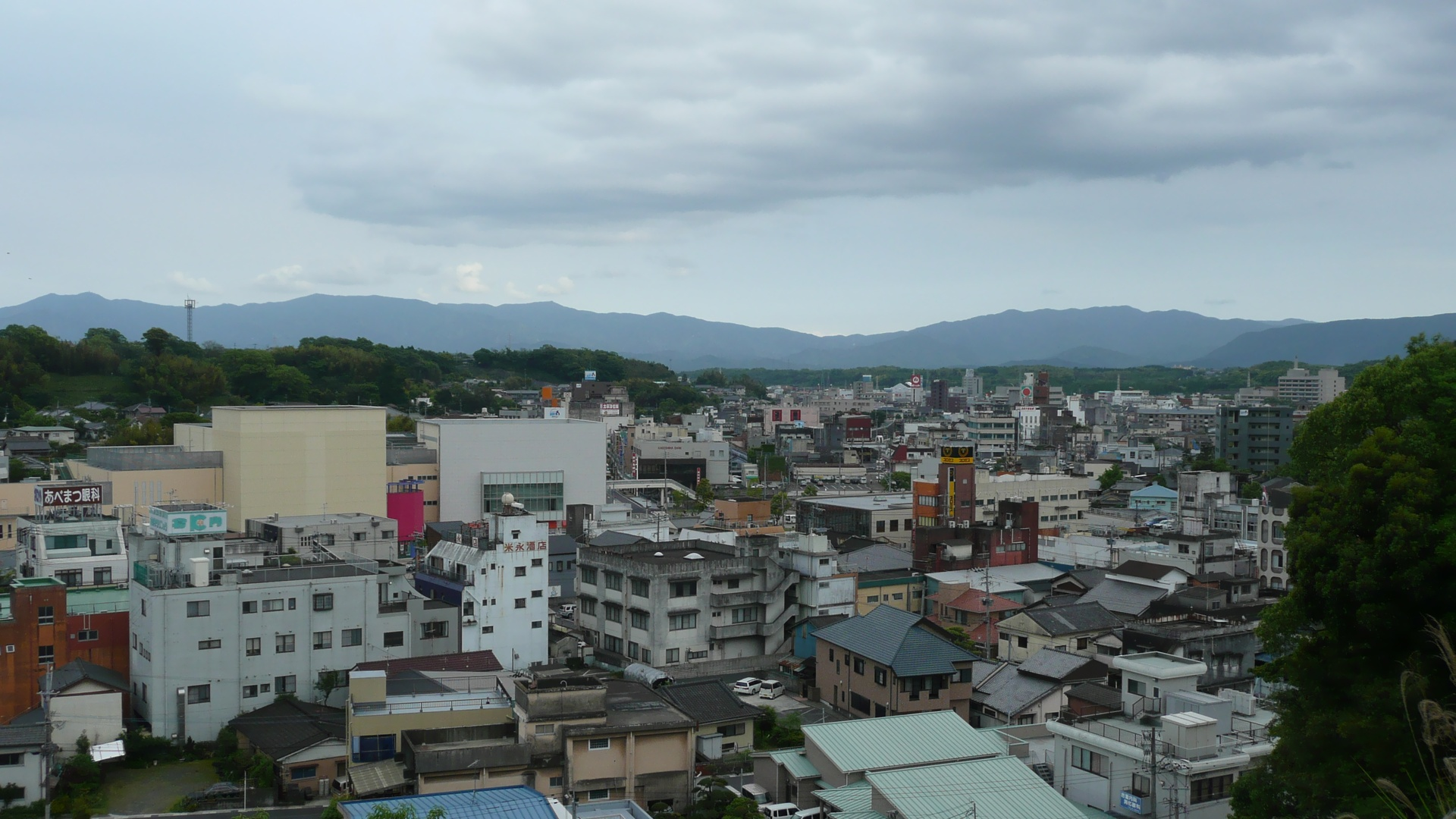
Kanoya

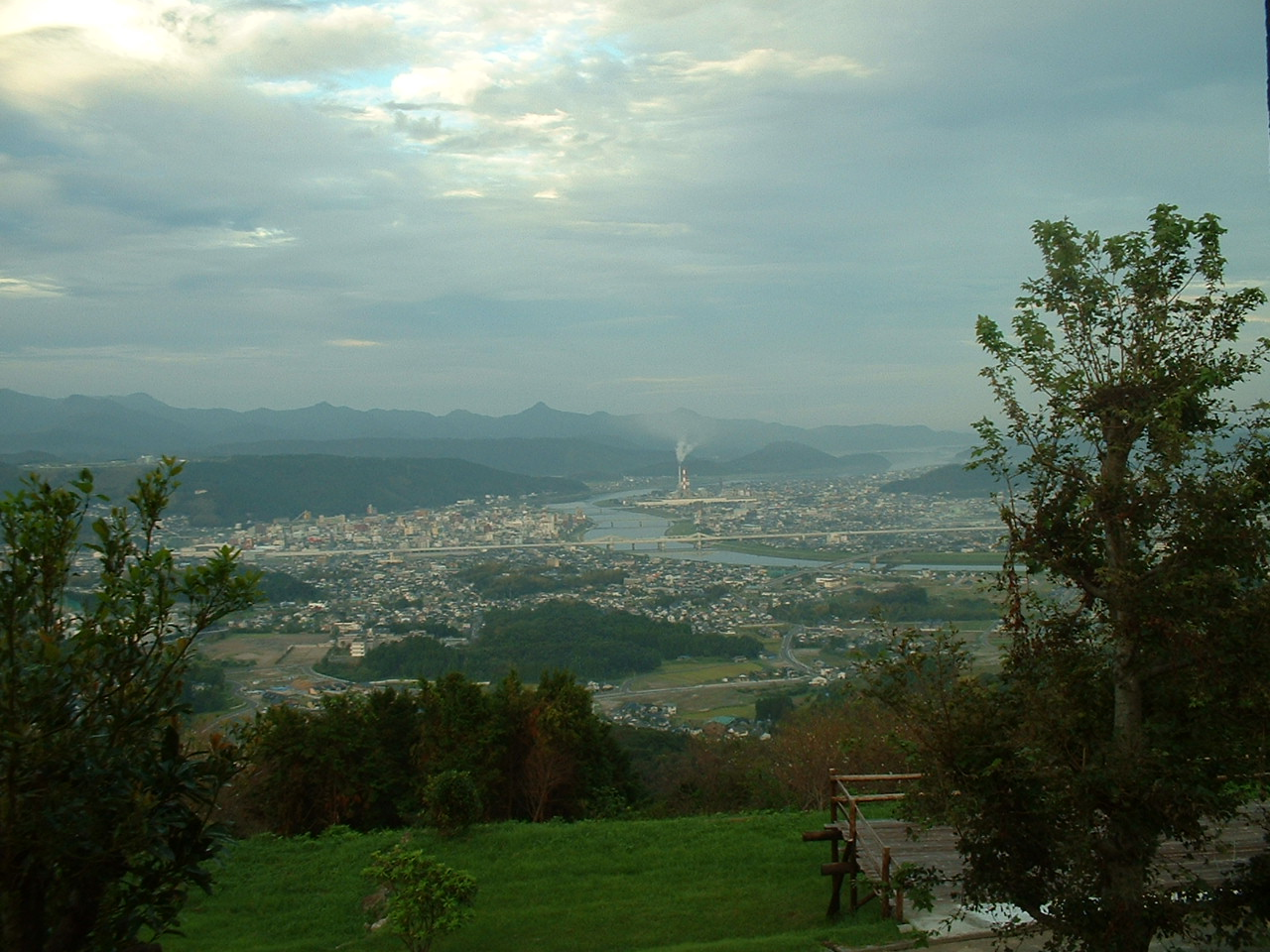
Satsumasendai

The following table lists the 24 cities, towns and villages in Kagoshima with a population of at least 10,000 on October 1, 2020, according to the 2020 Census. The table also gives an overview of the evolution of the population since the 1995 census.

| Rank (2020) | Name | Status | 2020 | 2015 | 2010 | 2005 | 2000 | 1995 |
|---|---|---|---|---|---|---|---|---|
| 1 | Kagoshima | City | 593,460 | 599,814 | 605,846 | 604,367 | 601,693 | 594,430 |
| 2 | Kirishima | City | 123,205 | 125,857 | 127,487 | 127,309 | 127,912 | 122,279 |
| 3 | Kanoya | City | 101,204 | 103,608 | 105,070 | 106,208 | 106,462 | 105,059 |
| 4 | Satsumasendai | City | 92,459 | 96,076 | 99,589 | 102,370 | 105,464 | 106,737 |
| 5 | Aira | City | 76,405 | 75,173 | 74,809 | 74,840 | 73,640 | 71,762 |
| 6 | Izumi | City | 52,016 | 53,758 | 55,621 | 57,907 | 58,460 | 58,655 |
| 7 | Hioki | City | 47,166 | 49,249 | 50,822 | 52,411 | 53,391 | 52,791 |
| 8 | Amami | City | 41,416 | 43,156 | 46,121 | 49,617 | 51,898 | 53,410 |
| 9 | Ibusuki | City | 39,045 | 41,831 | 44,396 | 46,822 | 48,750 | 50,529 |
| 10 | Soo | City | 33,312 | 36,557 | 39,221 | 42,287 | 44,910 | 46,328 |
| 11 | Minamikyūshū | City | 33,118 | 36,352 | 39,065 | 42,191 | 44,137 | 45,792 |
| 12 | Minamisatsuma | City | 32,894 | 35,439 | 38,704 | 41,677 | 43,979 | 45,845 |
| 13 | Shibushi | City | 29,343 | 31,479 | 33,034 | 34,770 | 35,966 | 36,694 |
| 14 | Ichikikushikino | City | 27,511 | 29,282 | 31,144 | 32,993 | 34,266 | 35,534 |
| 15 | Isa | City | 24,461 | 26,810 | 29,304 | 31,499 | 33,508 | 35,007 |
| 16 | Satsuma | Town | 20,272 | 22,400 | 24,109 | 25,688 | 27,331 | 28,141 |
| 17 | Makurazaki | City | 20,052 | 22,046 | 23,638 | 25,150 | 26,317 | 27,640 |
| 18 | Akune | City | 19,289 | 21,198 | 23,154 | 25,072 | 26,270 | 27,506 |
| 19 | Nishinoomote | City | 14,701 | 15,967 | 16,951 | 18,198 | 18,866 | 19,822 |
| 20 | Kimotsuki | Town | 14,237 | 15,664 | 17,160 | 18,307 | 19,523 | 20,317 |
| 21 | Tarumizu | City | 13,817 | 15,520 | 17,248 | 18,928 | 20,107 | 20,933 |
| 22 | Ōsaki | Town | 12,385 | 13,241 | 14,215 | 15,303 | 16,018 | 16,480 |
| 23 | Yakushima | Town | 11,869 | 12,913 | 13,589 | 13,761 | 13,875 | 13,593 |
| 24 | Tokunoshima | Town | 10,161 | 11,160 | 12,090 | 12,892 | 13,127 | 13,640 |
