= Yokose Kofun =

Kofun period burial mound in Japan

- 横瀬古墳 (Japanese)
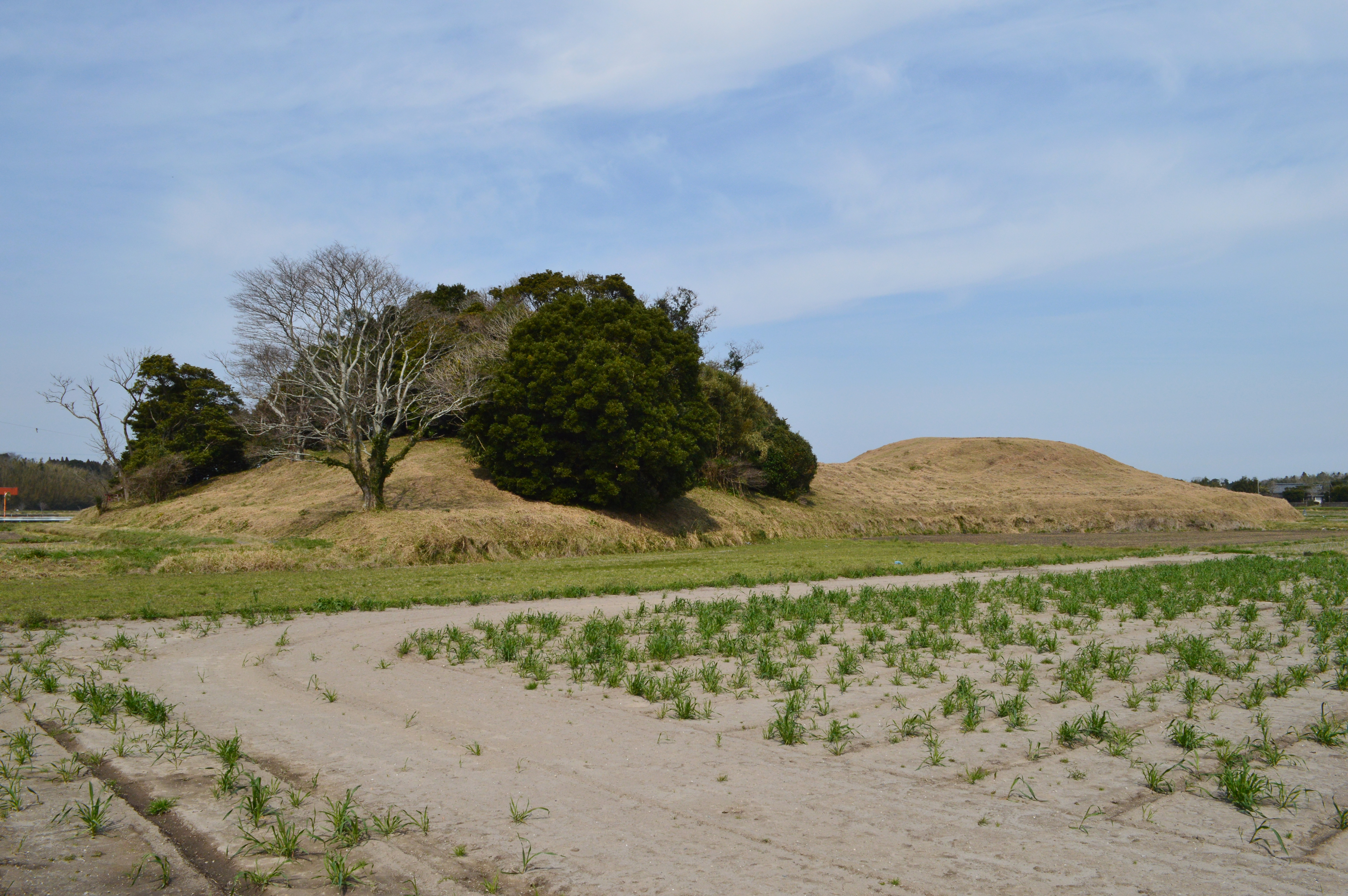
- Yokose Kofun

- Yokose Kofun Yokose Kofun (Japan)
- Interactive map of Yokose Kofun
- 31°24′47.88″N 131°00′53.95″E
- Type: Kofun
- Periods: Kofun period
- Location: Ōsaki, Kagoshima, Japan
- Region: Kyushu

History
- Built: c.5th century

Site notes
- Public access: Yes (no facilities)

The Yokose Kofun (横瀬古墳) is a Kofun period burial mound, located in the town of Ōsaki, Kagoshima Prefecture, Japan. The tumulus was designated a National Historic Site of Japan in 1943. It is the second largest tumulus in Kagoshima Prefecture after the Tōjin Ōtsuka Kofun, and is estimated to have been constructed in the mid-to-late 5th century (middle Kofun period).

== Overview ==
The Yokose Kofun is located in a paddy field on the right bank of the Mochidome River, located almost in the center of the Kimotsuki Plain that spreads inside the sand dunes along the coast of Shibushi Bay. It is a zenpō-kōen-fun (前方後円墳), which is shaped like a keyhole, having one square end and one circular end, when viewed from above. The total length is approximately 135 meters, the diameter of the posterior circular portion is 72.5 meters with a height of approximately 13.6 meters. The width at the constriction between the anterior and posterior portions is 45 meters. The anterior rectangular portion has a width of 62.5 meters, and height of 9.6 meters, and there is a surrounding moat with a width of 11.3 to 18.7 meters with a depth of 1.5 meters. There are also traces of a surrounding moat on the outside of the northern end of the circular portion and southern end of the rectangular portion, and it is thought that there may have originally been a double ring moat. The tumulus is orientated to the southwest.

It has been known to be an ancient tomb since the Edo period, and there is currently a Shinto shrine on the anterior portion. A pit-style stone burial chamber is located in the rear circle. It was robbed around 1902, and iron swords and other items were unearthed, but archaeological excavations conducted in 1997 and the following year discovered cylindrical and figurine haniwa, which are rare in the prefecture, fragments of armor, magatama, and Sue ware pottery. Two cylindrical haniwa are on display at the Kagoshima Prefectural Museum.

The tumulus is approximately 19 minutes by car from Shibushi Station on the JR Kyushu Nichinan Line.

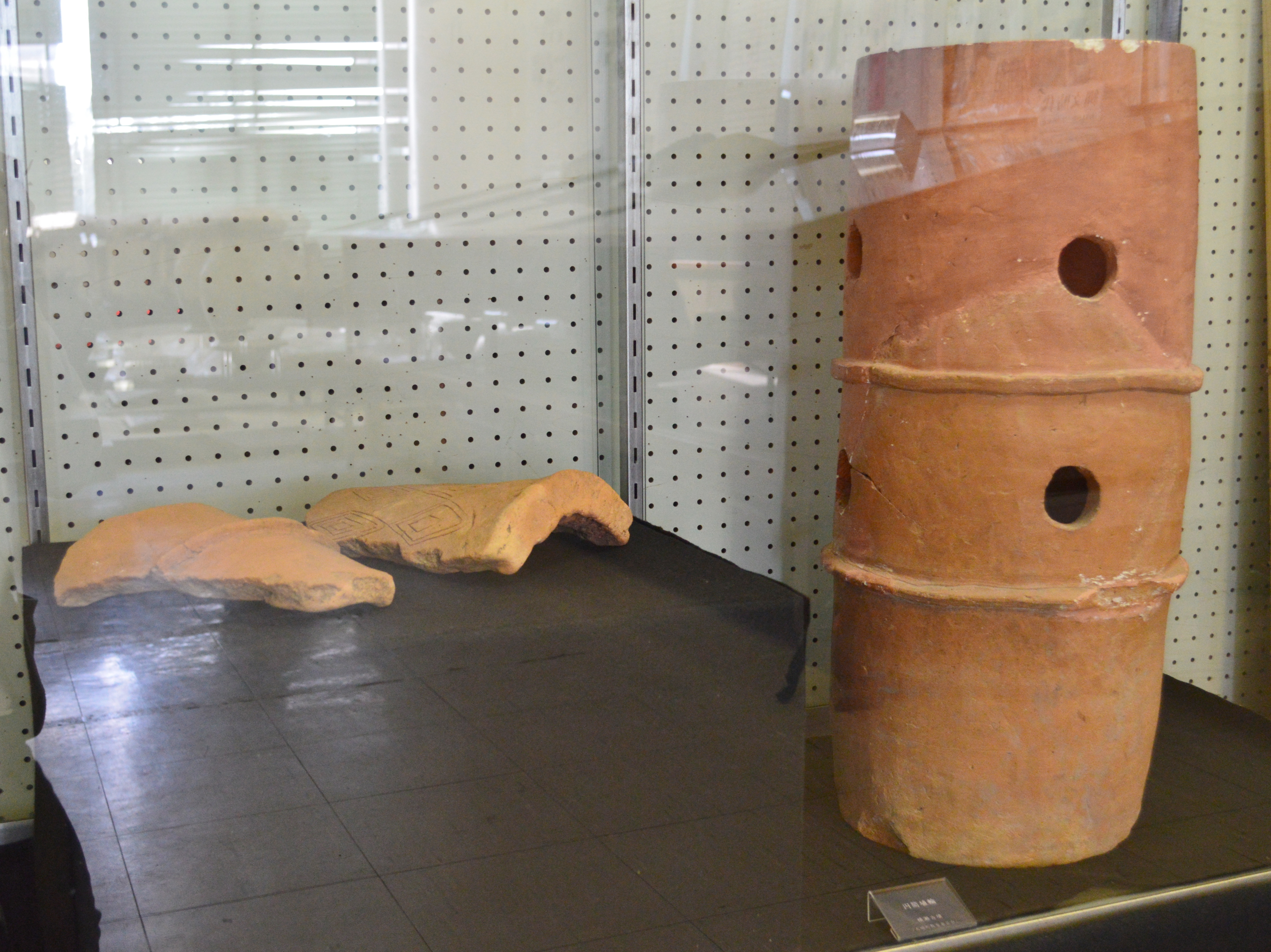
Haniwa from the Yokose Kofun

== See also ==
- List of Historic Sites of Japan (Kagoshima)
