= Tōjin Kofun Cluster =

Japanese burial mound

- 唐仁古墳群 (Japanese)
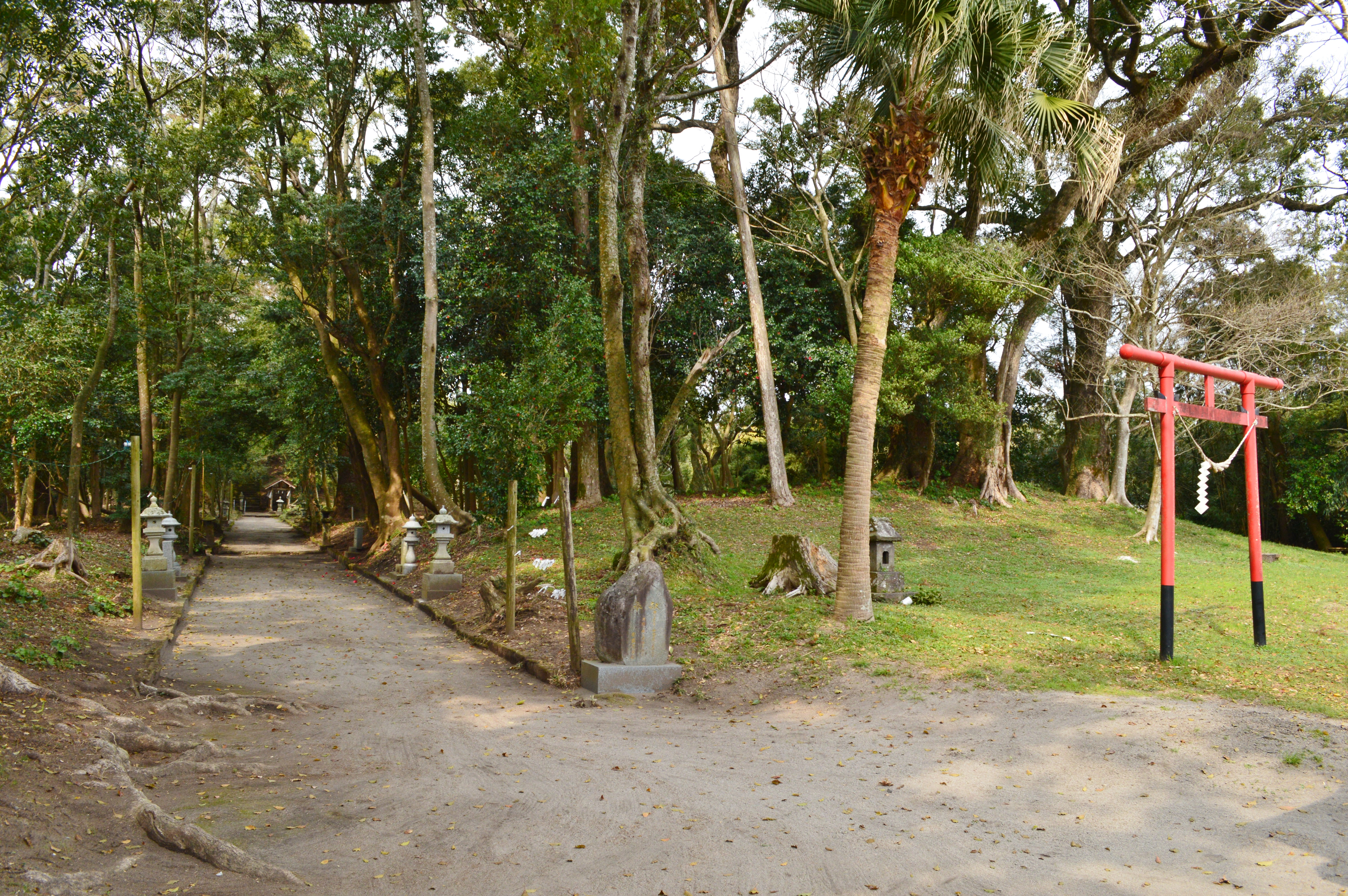
- Tōjin Kofun No.1

- Tōjin Kofun Cluster Tōjin Kofun Cluster (Kagoshima Prefecture)
- Interactive map of Tōjin Kofun Cluster
- 31°21′11.40″N 130°58′2.96″E
- Type: Kofun
- Periods: Kofun period
- Location: Higashikushira, Kagoshima, Japan
- Region: Kyushu

History
- Built: c.4th-5th century

Site notes
- Public access: Yes

Tōjin Kofun Cluster (唐仁古墳群) is a group of Kofun period burial mounds located in the Shinkawanishi neighborhood of the town of Higashikushira, Kagoshima Prefecture, Japan. The site been protected as a National Historic Site since 1934. It is the largest group of burial mounds in Kagoshima Prefecture, and includes the largest kofun in the prefecture, the Tōjin Ōtsuka Kofun (唐仁大塚古墳)

== Overview ==
The Tōjin Kofun Cluster is built in a sand dune belt on a slightly elevated area at an elevation of five to seven meters, on the left bank of the downstream of the Kimosuke River, on the coast of Shibushi Bay on the east coast of Ōsumi Peninsula in eastern Kagoshima Prefecture. In the surrounding area are the Tsukazaki Kofun Cluster (Kimotsuki) to the south, the Okazaki Kofun Cluster (Kanoya) to the west, and the Yokose/Jinryo Kofun Cluster (Ōsaki) to the north. Of these, the Tōjin Kofun Cluster consists of a total of 130 burial mounds, including three zenpō-kōen-fun (前方後円墳), 119 enpun (円墳) round tumuli, and eight tumuli whose structure is uncertain.

Kofun No.1 (Tōjin Ōtsuka Kofun) measures 140 meters in length, (185 meters including surrounding moat) and height of 11 meters, making it the largest tumulus in Kagoshima Prefecture, and third largest in Kyushu. A Shinto shrine, the Ōtsuka Jinja, is located on top of the tumulus, and five lid stones of the stone burial chamber are exposed below the shrine buildings. The burial chamber contained a sandstone boat-shaped sarcophagus with a length of 2.75 meters and a width of 0.87 meters, and remains of iron armor were found between the north wall and the sarcophagus. It is estimated that this tumulus was built in the late 4th century, in the latter half of the early Kofun period.

Most of the kofun are small-sized round tumuli, with the exception of the three zenpō-kōen-fun (Kofun No. 1, 16, and 100) and the medium-sized round tumuli (Kofun No. 17 and 33). Furthermore, no underground horizontal cave tombs have been confirmed, in which the burial chamber is dug horizontally from the bottom of a vertical pit have been found in the area, although this style was popular in the Ōsumi Peninsula around the middle of the Kofun period. This could be because the area was geologically unsuitable, being on a sand dune area, or else it could be an indication that the local clan had a close social and political relationship with the Yamato Kingdom in the Kinai region.

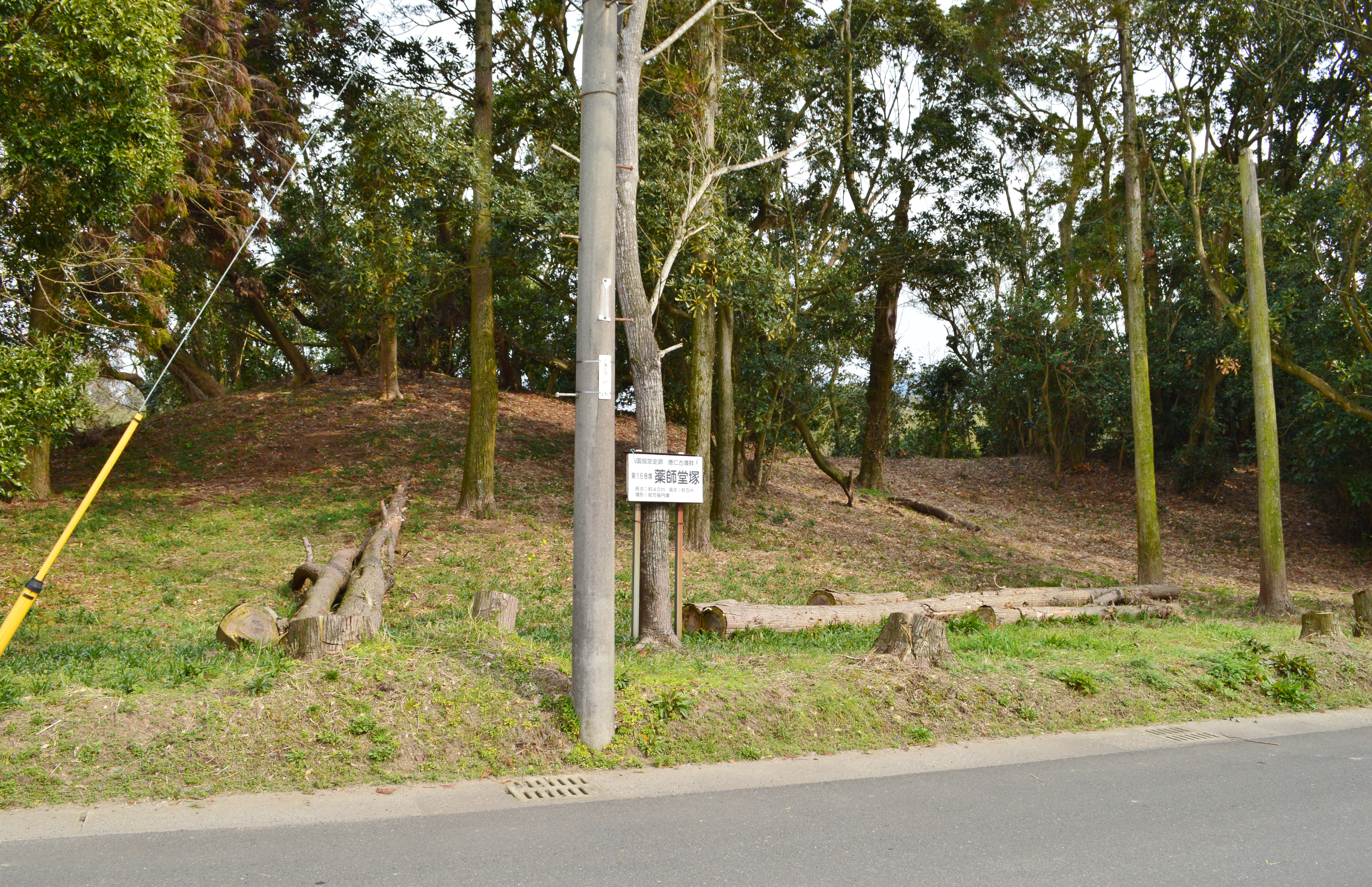
Kofun No.16(Yakushidozuka Kofun)

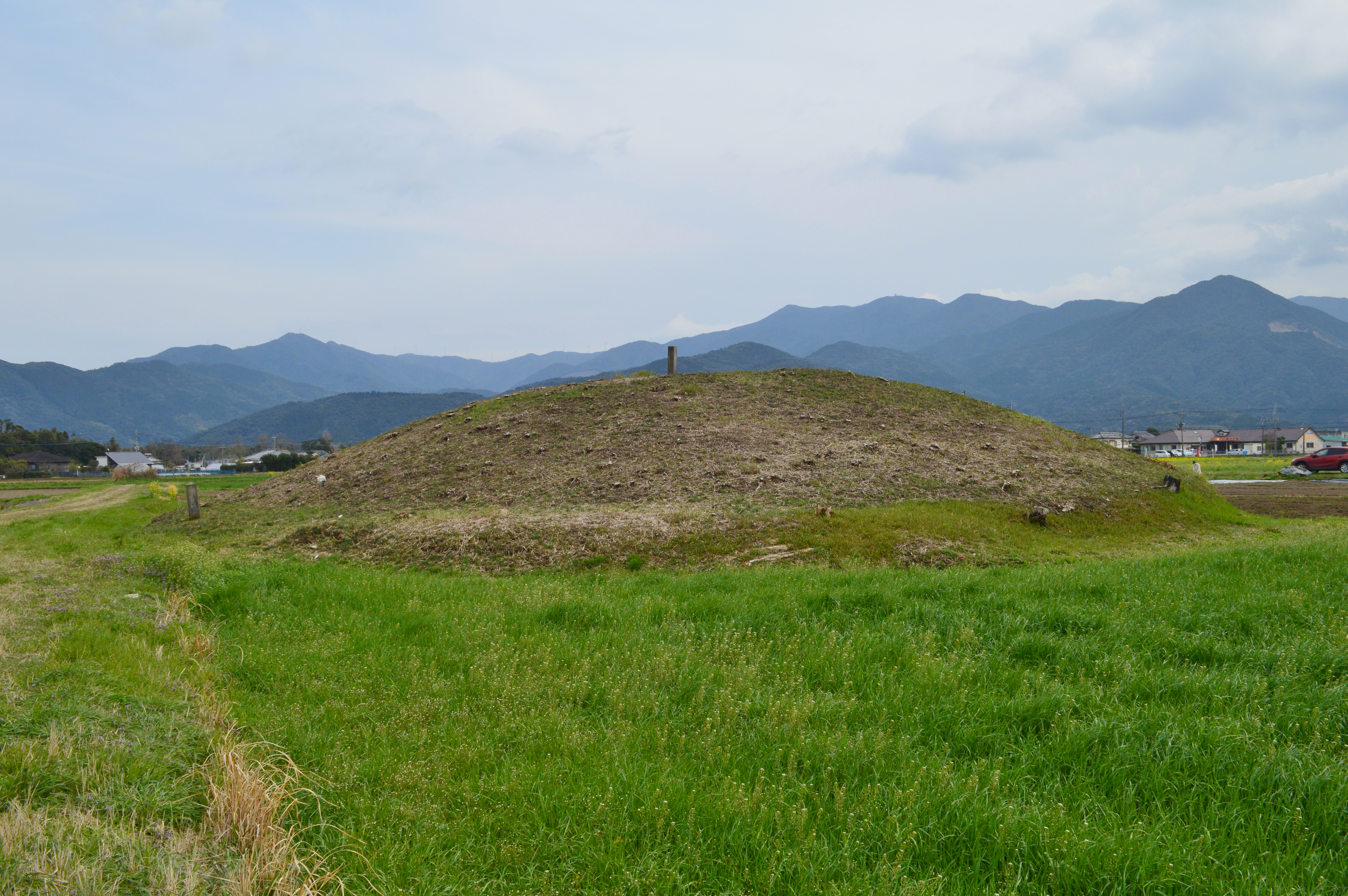
Kofun No.33(Mukaizuka Kofun)

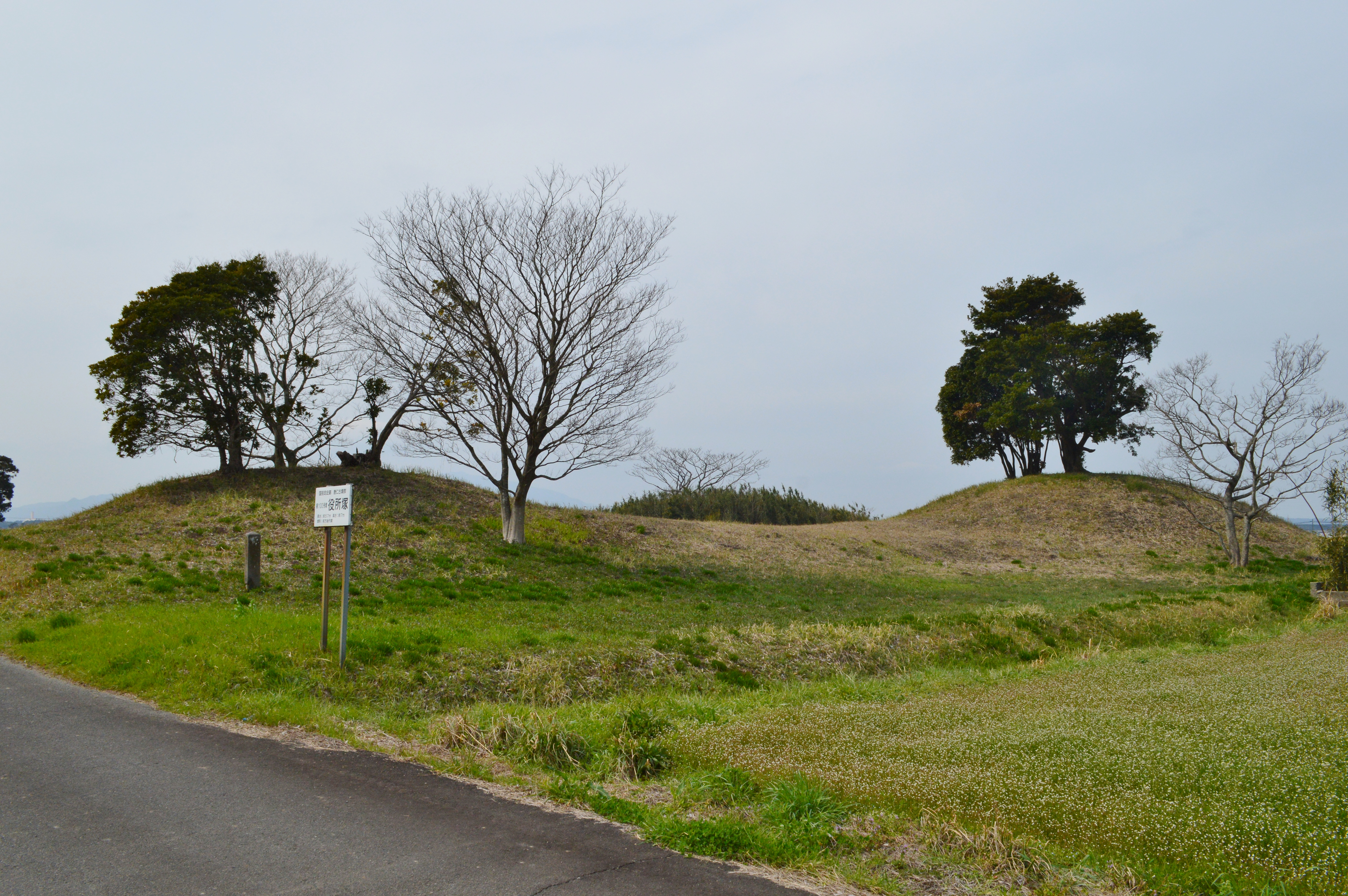
Kofun No.100(Yakushozuka Kofun)

The site is approximately 35 minutes by car from Shibushi Station on the JR Kyushu Nichinan Line.

== See also ==
- List of Historic Sites of Japan (Kagoshima)
