= Takarabe, Kagoshima =

Dissolved municipality in Kagoshima prefecture, Japan

Takarabe (財部町, Takarabe-chō) was a town located in Soo District, Kagoshima Prefecture, Japan.

In 2003, the town had an estimated population of 10,634 and a density of 91.89 per square kilometre (238.0/sq mi). The total area was 115.72 square kilometres (44.68 sq mi).

On July 1, 2005, Takarabe, along with the towns of Ōsumi and Sueyoshi (all from Soo District), was merged to create the city of Soo and no longer exists as an independent municipality.
