= Shibushi Castle =

Castle in Shibushi, Kagoshima, Japan

- 志布志城
- Shibushi, Kagoshima Prefecture, Japan
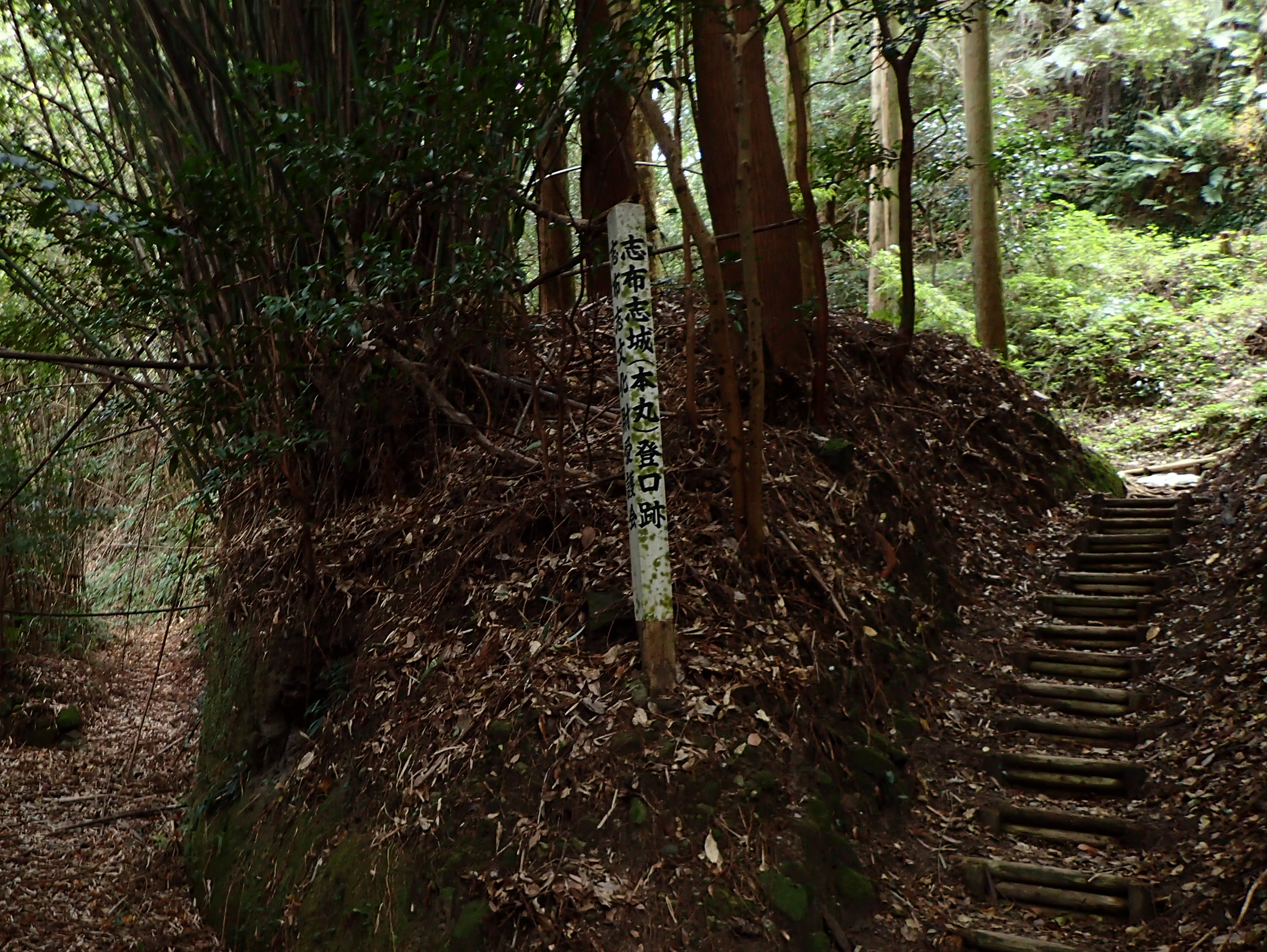
- Shibushi Castle ruins

Site information
- Type: Hirayama-style castle
- Owner: Hatakeyama clan, Niiro clan, Kimotsuki clan, Shimazu clan
- Condition: ruins

Location
- Coordinates: 31°29′5.4″N 131°6′32.4″E

Site history
- Built: Kamakura or Muromachi period
- Built by: Shimazu clan
- Demolished: 1615

Garrison information
- Past commanders: Shimazu Ujihisa, Korehisa Niiro, Masachika Kamata
- National Historic Site of Japan

Shibushi Castle (志布志城, Shibushi-jō) was a Muromachi to early Edo period hirajiro-style Japanese castle located in the city of Shibushi, Kagoshima Prefecture, Japan. Its ruins have been protected as a National Historic Site since 2005.

== Overview ==
The origins of Shibushi Castle are uncertain. At the start of the Kamakura shogunate, Minamoto no Yoritomo assigned the provinces of Satsuma, Ōsumi and Hyūga Province to his retainer Shimazu Tadahisa, who established the vast Shimazu shōen landed estate. The bay at Shibushi was the main port of that domain and was assigned to the Niiro clan, who built fortifications on all of the hills surrounding the port settlement, which can collectively be called "Shibushi Castle". The Niiro clan continued to hold Shibushi until the beginning of 16th century, when they became involved in an internal conflict of the Shimazu clan between Shimazu Takahisa (1514-1571) and Shimazu Sanehisa (1512-1553) and were dispossessed in 1538. The Shimazu ruled Shibushi directly for a short period, but in 1562, taking advantage of the weakened and disordered state of the Shimazu clan, the castle was seized by the neighboring Kimotsuki clan. The Shimazu recovered the castle in 1577. The castle continued to be used as a local stronghold until it was demolished due to the Tokugawa shogunate's "one country, one castle" rule in 1615. However, the Shimazu destroyed only the buildings, leaving much of the stone walls intact.

Shibushi Castle consist of four separated strongholds which surround the urban center and port of Shibushi. The main castle is called as "Uchijyo" and spreads over a rectangular-shaped hill 300 by 600 meters at an elevation of 50 meters on the mountain behind Shibushi Elementary School. Matsuo Castle on the mountain to the west of it, and the Taka Castle and Shin Castle are front of Shibushi Junior High School. The inner castle has four lines of enclosures separated by dry moats with two line of straight dry moat guarding both side of the hill. The main gate was at southwestern edge of the castle, and back gate was on its east side. While the castle appears to have a flat on ordered arrangement on a plan, each of the enclosures is on a different level, separated by sheer walls and steep slopes. Most of the castle ruins are undeveloped and difficult to enter. Explanatory panels have been installed in some of the enclosures, such as the main enclosure, and pamphlets are placed at the main entrance.

The castle site is a 20-minute walk from JR Kyushu Shibushi Station.

The castle was listed as one of the Continued Top 100 Japanese Castles in 2017.

== See also ==
- List of Historic Sites of Japan (Kagoshima)

== Literature ==
Media related to Shibushi Castle at Wikimedia Commons

- De Lange, William (2021). An Encyclopedia of Japanese Castles. Groningen: Toyo Press. pp. 600 pages. ISBN 978-9492722300.
- Schmorleitz, Morton S. (1974). Castles in Japan. Tokyo: Charles E. Tuttle Co. pp. 144–145. ISBN 0-8048-1102-4.
- Motoo, Hinago (1986). Japanese Castles. Tokyo: Kodansha. p. 200 pages. ISBN 0-87011-766-1.
