= Sueyoshi, Kagoshima =

Dissolved municipality in Kagoshima prefecture, Japan

Sueyoshi (末吉町, Sueyoshi-chō) was a town located in Soo District, Kagoshima Prefecture, Japan.

As of 2003, the town had an estimated population of 20,106 and the density of 155.75 persons per km^{2}. The total area was 129.09 km^{2}.

On July 1, 2005, Sueyoshi, along with the towns of Ōsumi and Takarabe (all from Soo District), was merged to create the city of Soo and no longer exists as an independent municipality.
