= Soo District, Kagoshima =

District in Kagoshima prefecture, Japan

Coordinates: 31.439°N 130.983°E

The location of Soo District in Kagoshima

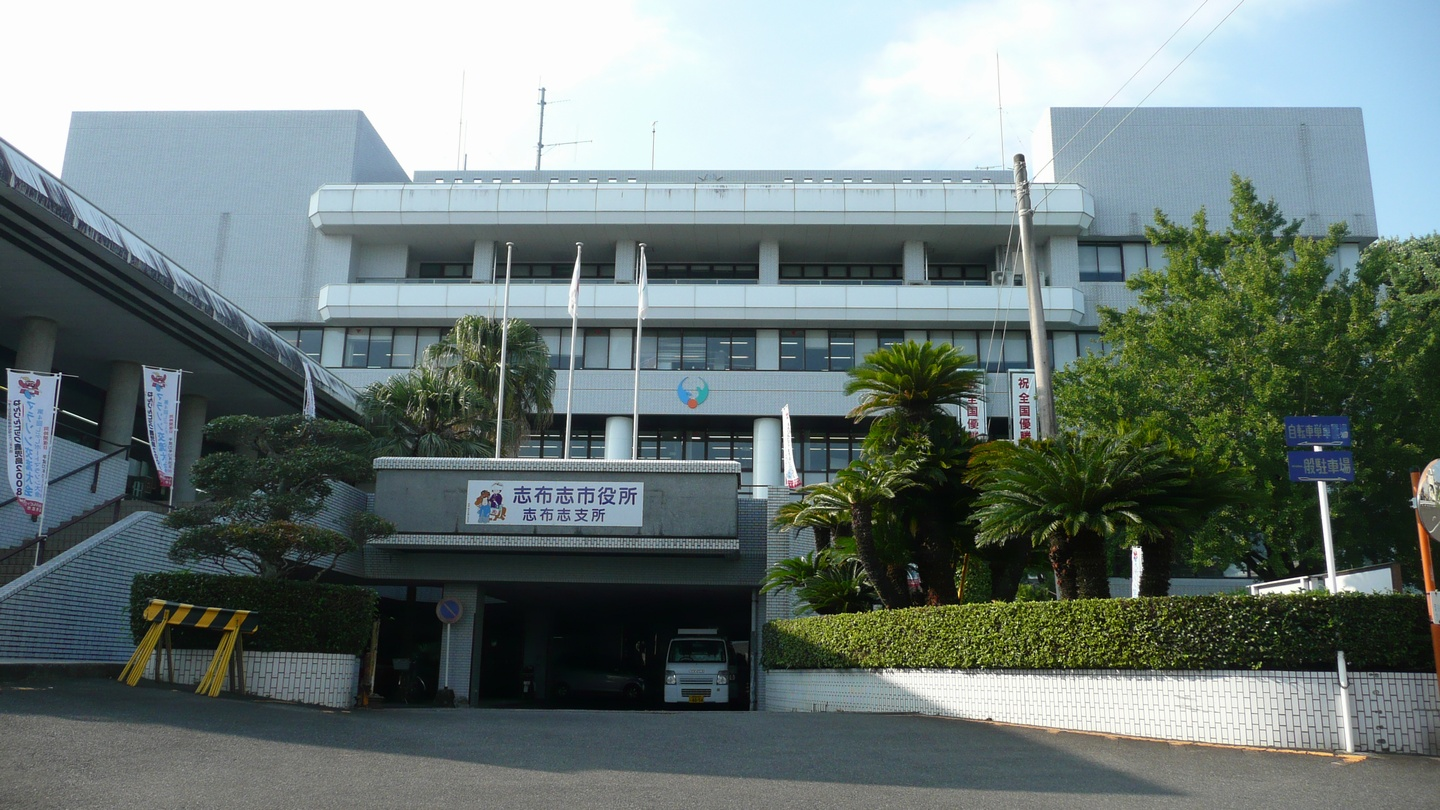
Shibushi City Office

Soo (曽於郡, Sō-gun) is a district located in Kagoshima Prefecture, Japan.

As of October 1, 2008, the district has an estimated population of 14,713 and a density of 146 persons/km^{2}. The total area is 100.82 km^{2}.

The district has one town:

- Ōsaki

== History ==
The district was once written "囎唹郡," and it was part of Ōsumi Province. The district broke off into Higashisoo and Nishisoo Districts in May 1878. When the district government was activated on April 1, 1897, Nishisoo was merged with Aira District and Higashisoo was merged with Minamimorokata District (broke off from Morokata District in the former Hyūga Province) to become Soo District.

=== Timeline ===
==== Soo District (–1887) ====
- July 22, 1887 - Soo District broke off into Higashisoo and Nishisoo Districts.

==== Soo District (1897–present) ====
- April 1, 1897 - Higashisoo District and Minamimorokata District merged to form Soo District. The villages of Sueyoshi, Iwagawa, Tsuneyoshi, Takarabe, Ichinari, Higashishibushi, Nishishibushi, Tsukino, Matsuyama, Ōsaki, and Nogata were formed. (11 villages)
- July 1, 1913 - The village of Higashishibushi gained town status and renamed to become the town of Shibushi. (1 town, 10 villages)
- October 1, 1922 - The village of Sueyoshi gained town status to become the town of Sueyoshi. (2 towns, 9 villages)
- April 1, 1924 - The village of Iwagawa gained town status to become the town of Iwagawa. (3 towns, 8 villages)
- April 1, 1926 - The village of Takarabe gained town status to become the town of Takarabe. (4 towns, 7 villages)
- January 1, 1936 - The village of Ōsaki gained town status to become the town of Ōsaki. (5 towns, 6 villages)
- January 20, 1955 - The town of Iwagawa and the villages of Tsuneyoshi and Tsukino merged to form the town of Ōsumi. (5 towns, 4 villages)
- April 1, 1955 - The village of Nogata split and merged into the towns of Ōsumi, Ōsaki, and the village of Nishishibushi. (5 towns, 3 villages)
- April 1, 1956 - The village of Ichinari and the village of Mobiki from Kimotsuki District to form the town of Kihoku. (6 towns, 2 villages)
- April 1, 1958 (8 towns)
  - The village of Matsuyama gained town status to become the town of Matsuyama.
  - The village of Nishishibushi gained town status and renamed to become the town of Ariake.
- April 1, 1972 - Soo District (囎唹郡) changed their name to Soo District (曽於郡).
- July 1, 2005 - The towns of Ōsumi, Sueyoshi, and Takarabe merged to form the city of Soo.(5 towns)
- January 1, 2006 (1 town)
  - The towns of Ariake, Matsuyama, and Shibushi merged to form the city of Shibushi.
  - The town of Kihoku merged with the city of Kanoya and the towns of Kushira and Aira from Kimotsuki District to form the city of Kanoya.
