= Ōsumi, Kagoshima =

Dissolved municipality in Kagoshima prefecture, Japan

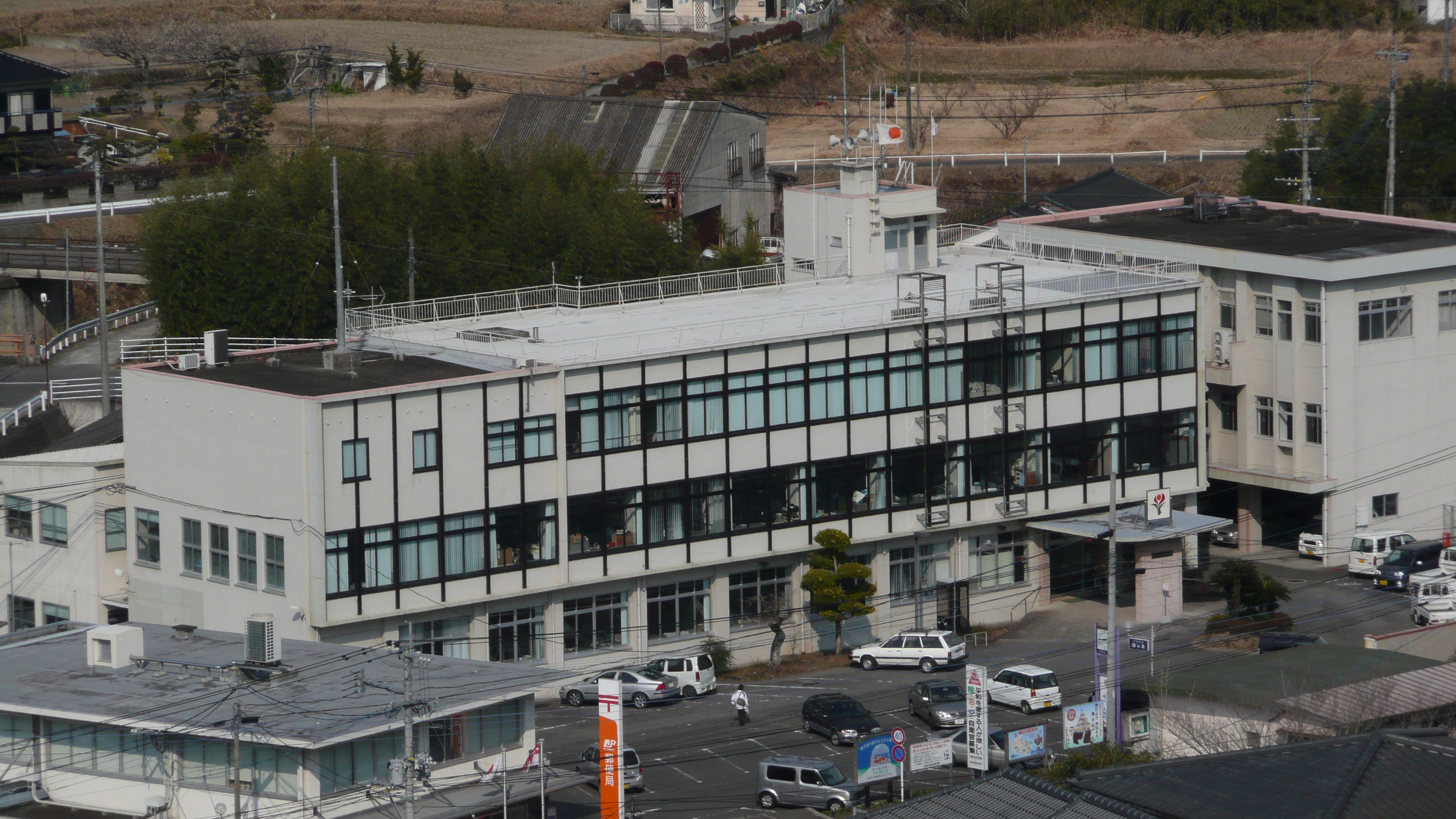
Town office (Soo City Office Ōsumi Branch, February 2008)

Osumi (大隅町, Ōsumi-chō) was a town located in Soo District, Kagoshima Prefecture, Japan. It is also known as Iwagawa.

As of 2003, the town had an estimated population of 12,941 and the density of 88.89 persons per km^{2}. The total area was 145.58 km^{2}.

On July 1, 2005, Ōsumi, along with the towns of Sueyoshi and Takarabe (all from Soo District), was merged to create the city of Soo and no longer exists as an independent municipality.

== Festivals ==
Osumi (Iwagawa) is the home to the Yagorodon Festival that is held in November.

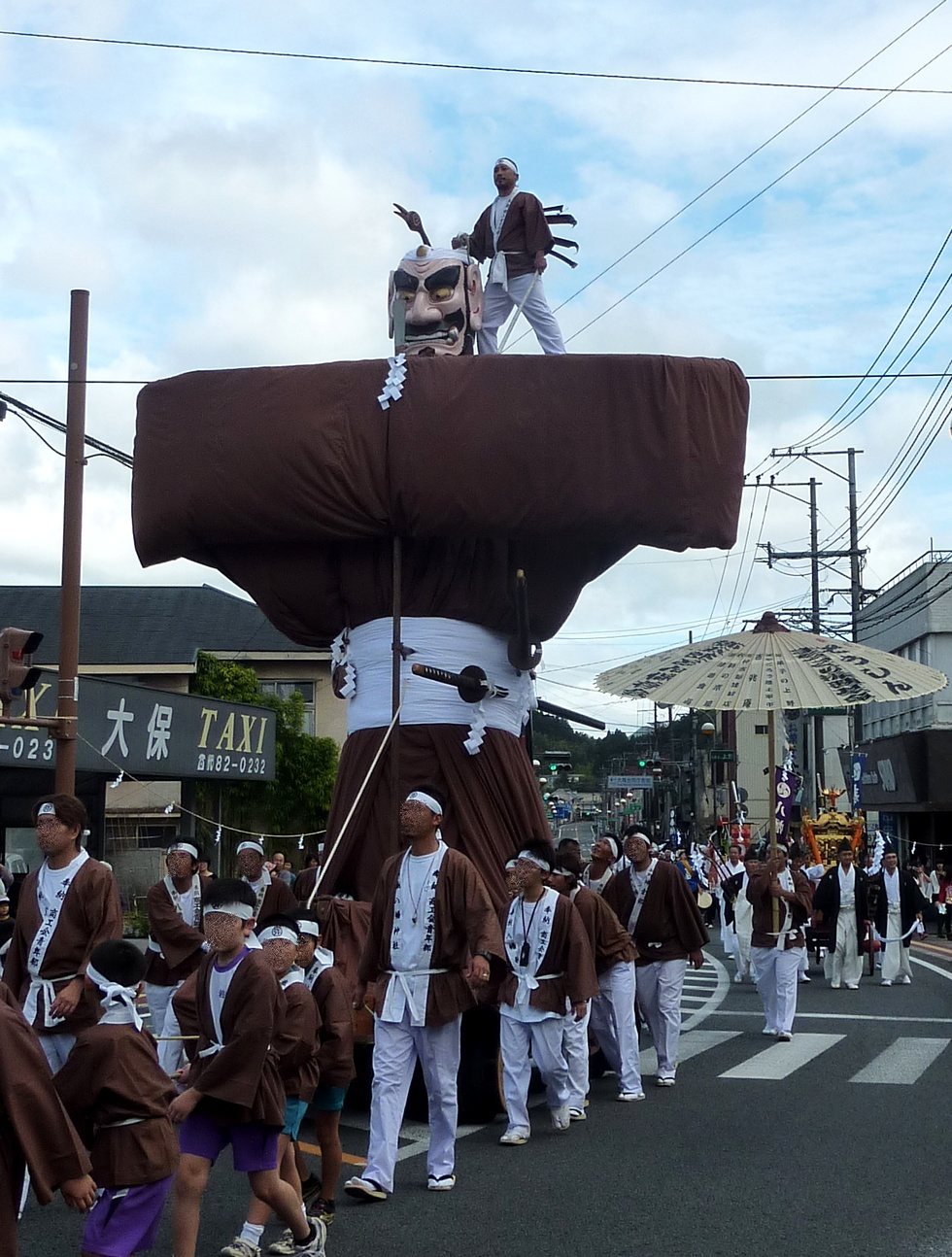
Yagorodon Festival 2011
