= Higashikushira, Kagoshima =

Higashikushira 東串良町
- Town
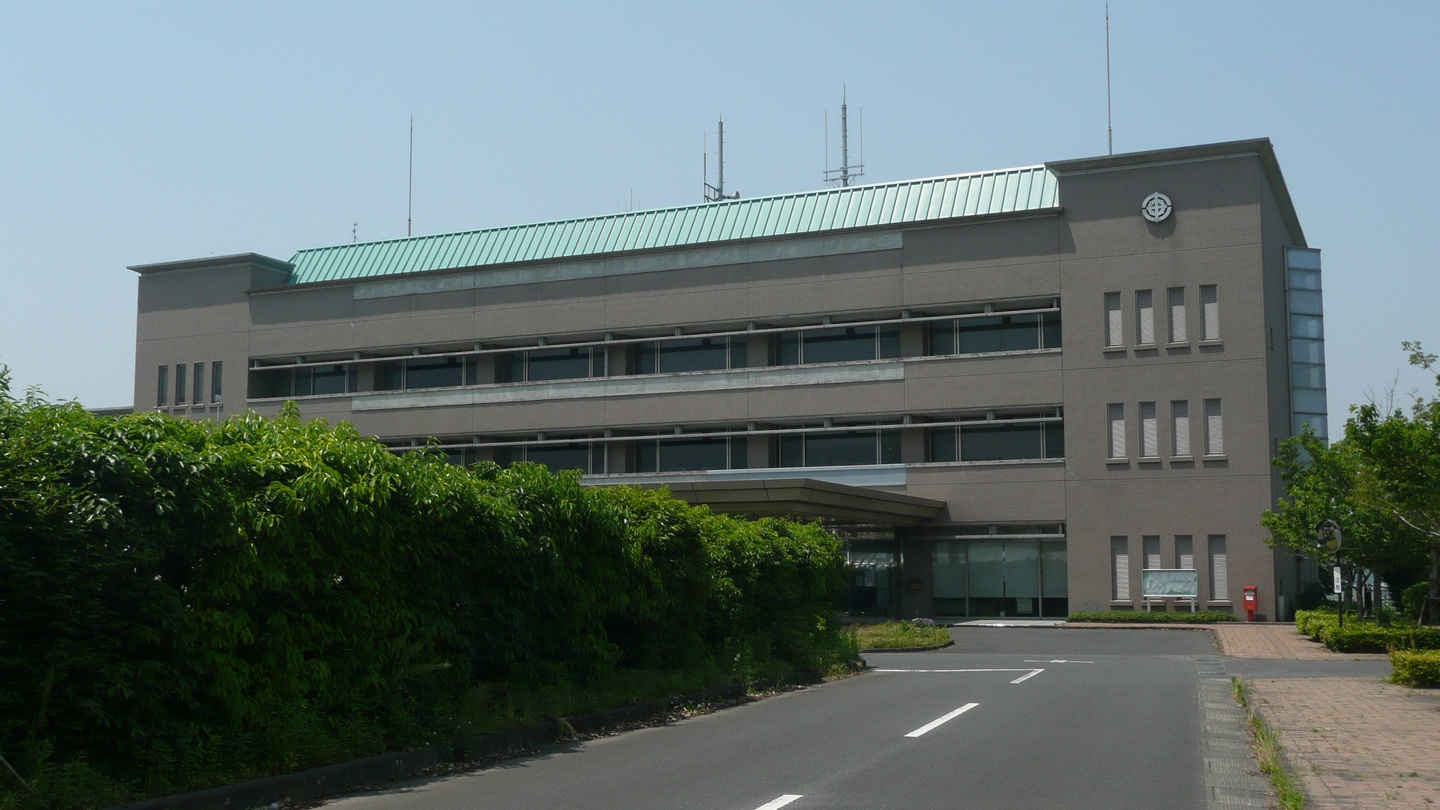
- Higashikushira Town Hall

- Flag Emblem
- Interactive map of Higashikushira
- Location in Japan
- Coordinates: 31°23′08″N 130°58′24″E
- Country: Japan
- Region: Kyushu
- Prefecture: Kagoshima Prefecture
- Kagoshima: Kimotsuki

Area
  - Total: 27.85 km^{2} (10.75 sq mi)

Population (January 1, 2023)
  - Total: 6,220
  - Density: 223/km^{2} (578/sq mi)
- Time zone: UTC+09:00 (JST)
- City hall address: 1543 Kawanishi, Higashikushira-cho, Kimozuki-gun, Kagoshima-ken 893-1600
- Website: Official website
- Symbols
- Flower: Lupinus
- Tree: Black Pine

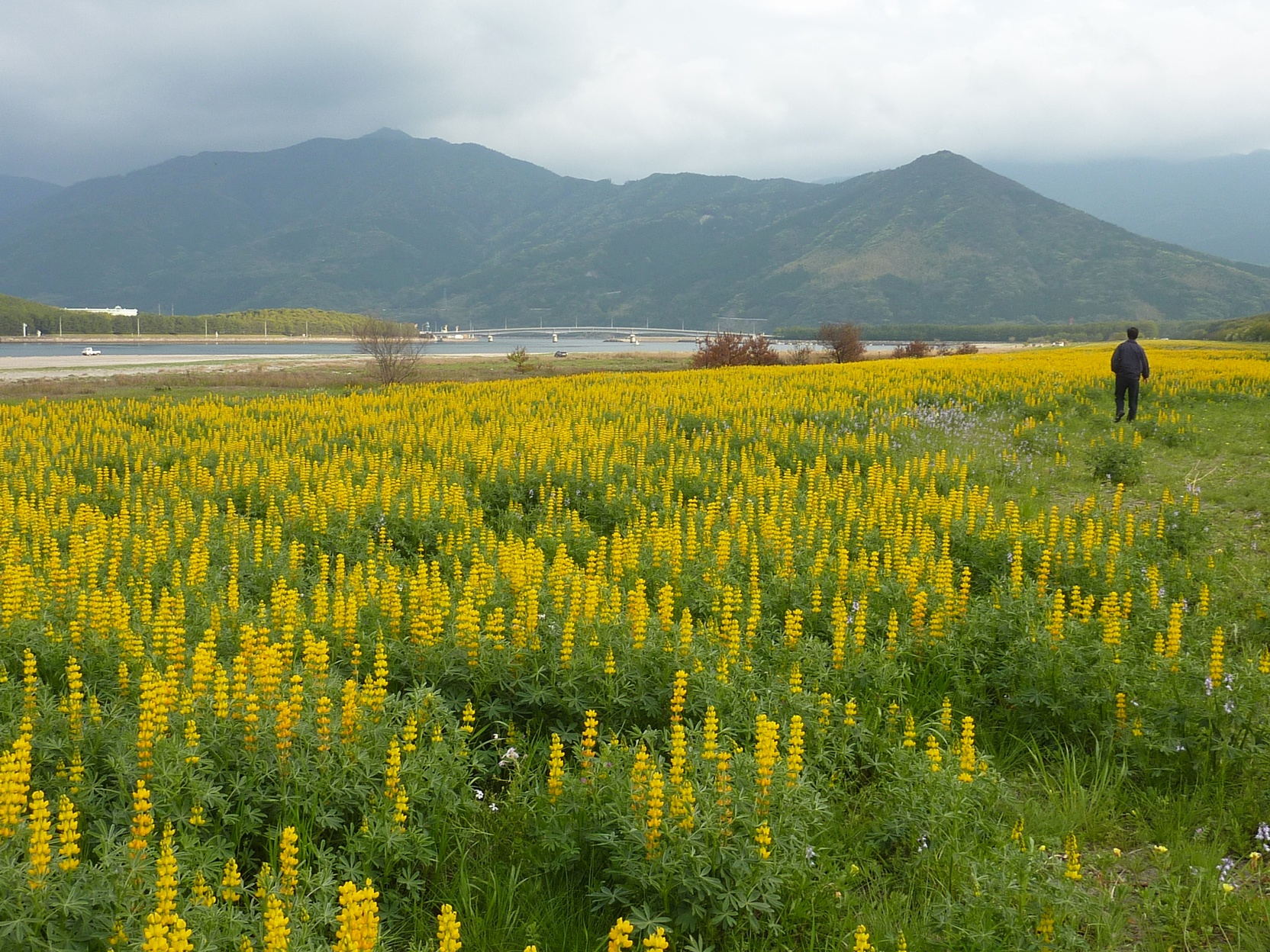
Lupin at Kashiwabaru Coast

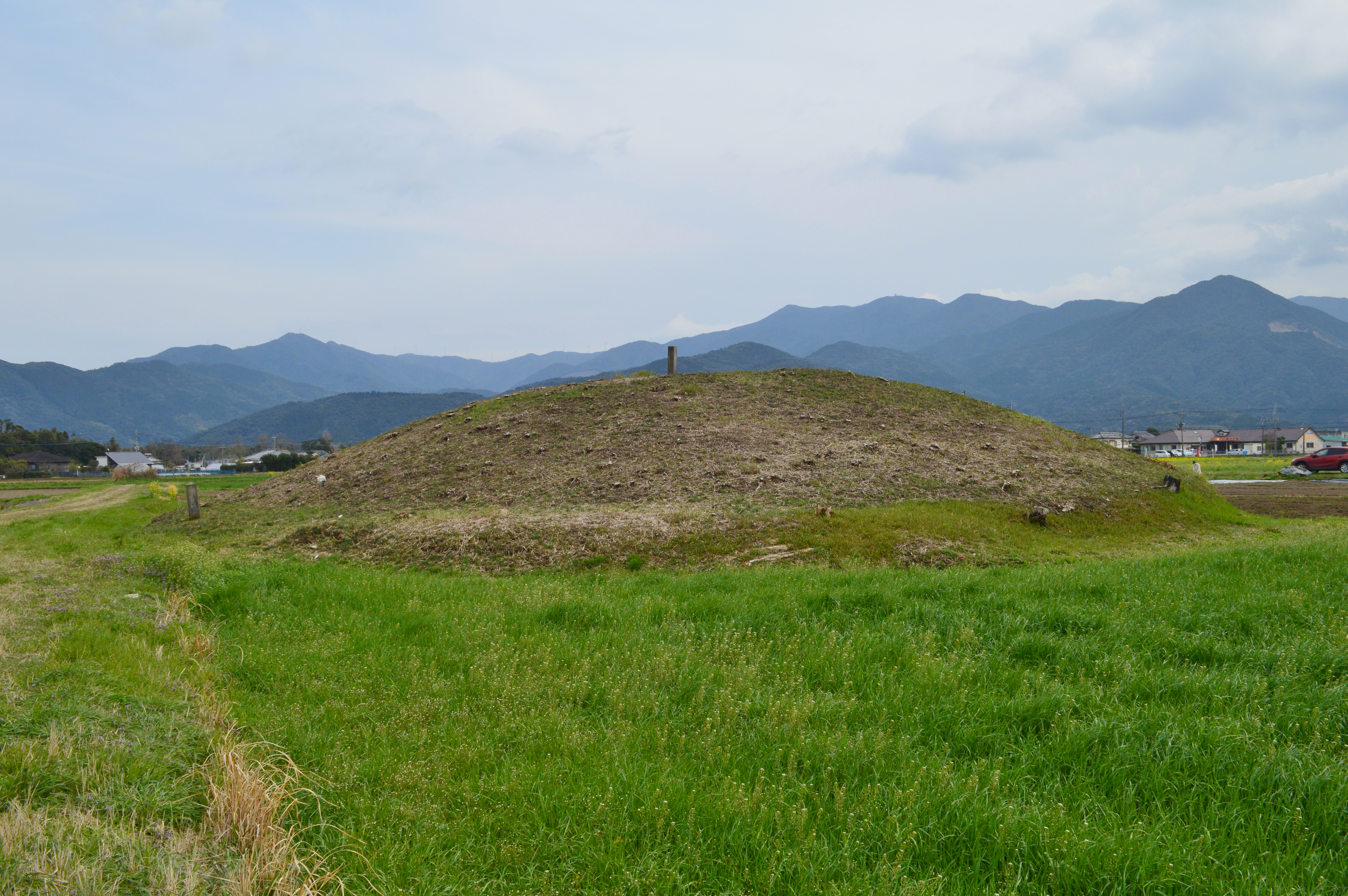
Tōjin Kofun Cluster

Higashikushira (東串良町, Higashikushira-chō) is a town located in Kimotsuki District, Kagoshima Prefecture, Japan. As of 1 January 2023, the town had an estimated population of 6,220 in 2829 households, and a population density of 220 persons per km^{2}. The total area of the town is 27.85 km^{2} (10.75 sq mi).

== Geography ==
Higashikushira is located on the east coast of the Ōsumi Peninsula in Kagoshima Prefecture. While the town itself is located on flat land, it is bordered to the south by mountains and to the east by Shibushi Bay. The highest point, at 77.5 meters above sea level, is on the Iwahiro Plateau, located in the northern portion of the town. The lay of the land is such that, from north to south, the elevation gradually declines.

=== Neighboring municipalities ===
Kagoshima Prefecture

- Kanoya
- Kimotsuki
- Ōsaki

== Climate ==
Higashikushira has a humid subtropical climate (Köppen Cfa) characterized by warm summers and cool winters with light to no snowfall. The average annual temperature in Higashikushira is 17.8 °C. The average annual rainfall is 2294 mm with September as the wettest month. The temperatures are highest on average in August, at around 26.9 °C, and lowest in January, at around 8.3 °C.

=== Demographics ===
Per Japanese census data, the population of Higashikushira is as shown below: The population has been in steady decline since the 1960s.

Historical population
Year	Pop.	±%
1920	8,059	—
1930	8,675	+7.6%
1940	8,747	+0.8%
1950	11,971	+36.9%
1960	11,161	−6.8%
1970	8,977	−19.6%
1980	8,440	−6.0%
1990	8,119	−3.8%
2000	7,530	−7.3%
2010	6,802	−9.7%
2020	6,237	−8.3%

== History ==
The area of present-day Higashikushira was first settled by peoples of the Jōmon and Yayoi cultures in the prehistoric period. Numerous archaeological sites in the town date from this period, including the "Tōjinkofun," the ancient tomb of Tojin. Higashikushira was part of ancient Ōsumi Province. During the Edo Period, the area was part of the holdings of Satsuma Domain. The village of Higashikushira established on May 1, 1889, with the creation of the modern municipalities system. On October 1, 1932, it was promoted to town status. Despite the recent national trend of towns and cities merging to form larger administrative units, the residents of Higashikushira voted to remain an independent township. Although various proposals were discussed, ranging from a merger with several local towns to absorption into the greater Kanoya city area, residents declined all options in favor of retaining local administration.

== Government ==
Higashikushira has a mayor-council form of government with a directly elected mayor and a unicameral town council of 10 members. Higashikushira, collectively with the other municipalities of Kimotsuki District, contributes one member to the Kagoshima Prefectural Assembly. In terms of national politics, the town is part of the Kagoshima 4th district of the lower house of the Diet of Japan.

The Higashikushira town office (yakuba 役場) is located in the Kawanishi (川西) section of town. The town also has four medical clinics, four fire brigades and two small police stations (kōban 交番). There is also the Sogo sentā, a town cultural center, a town gymnasium and a public athletic field.

== Economy ==
Agriculture, commercial fishing and animal husbandry comprise the greatest portion of Higashikushira's economic activity. Higashikushira produces daikon radishes, rice, goya, tomatoes, Satsuma sweet potatoes (Satsuma imo 薩摩芋) and is famous for its green peppers.

As of 2005, 1816 people worked in agriculture, including 816 full-time farmers.

== Education ==
There are three preschools, one kindergarten, two elementary schools and one junior high school in Higashikushira. These are all managed through the Town Board of Education . The town does not have a high school.

=== Junior High (Chūgakkō 中学校) ===
Higashikushira's Junior High School was founded in 1947 and had 792 students by 1962. Currently 160 students are attending the school in three grades.

The school sports teams include soccer, tennis, karate, basketball, judo, kendo, baseball and volleyball. There is also a student brass band. Notably, the basketball team won the Ōsumi Girls' Basketball Tournament in 2010, making it the top-ranked team in the region.

A number of events are organized at the school in the course of the year, including a sports day, a cultural festival and a chorus contest.

=== Ikenohara Elementary School (Ikenohara Shōgakkō 池之原小学校) ===
A view of the front of Ikenohara Primary School from January 2011

Ikenohara Elementary School was founded in 1892. There are 229 students currently in attendance, divided into six grades.

The school has eight sports teams, including kendo, volleyball, basketball, soccer and a swimming team. There are also six clubs, music, chemistry and comic illustration clubs among them.

The school's yearly events include a sports day, a marathon, a swimming tournament and an inter-school race.

=== Kashiwabaru Elementary School (Kashiwabaru Shōgakkō 柏原小学校) ===
Kashiwabaru Primary School was founded in 1873. There are currently 117 students in six grades attending the school.

The school has four sports teams: soccer, volleyball, softball and kendo. In 2010 the Kashiwabaru softball team was the top-ranked team in Kagoshima Prefecture. Students also participate in science and music clubs.

The school hosts a number of events for the students, including a field day and marathon.

=== Ikenohara Kindergarten (Ikenohara Yōchien 池之原幼稚園) ===
A view of the front of Ikenohara Yōchien

Eighteen children, aged three to six years, currently attend Ikenohara Kindergarten. Here they learn how to count, write hiragana script and acquire basic English skills. Among the highlights of the school year are a dance recital, a sports festival and a potato harvest.

=== Preschools (Hoikuen 保育園) ===
Higashikushira's three preschools educate children and aid parents during the early developmental years, starting from infancy until age three.

== Transportation ==
=== Railway ===
Higashikushira has not had any passenger railway service since Higashikushira Station on the former JNR Ōsumi Line was closed on March 13, 1987, The nearest train station is now Shibushi Station on the JR Kyushu Nichinan Line. .

=== Highway ===
- National Route 220
- National Route 448

== Places of interest ==
There are 132 archaeological sites in Higashikushira, dating from the prehistoric Jōmon and Yayoi periods. Among the most famous is the Tōjin Kofun Cluster, a National Historic Site. Archaeological digs and research are an ongoing process in the town.

== Notable people from Higashikushira ==
Among the town's 'famous sons' are Setoue Kenjiro and Kiyoshi Nakakura. Setoue Kenjiro was a noted doctor in Japan, while Nakakura Kiyoshi was a kendo master who traveled as far as Brazil in his efforts to promote the martial art.
