= Matsuyama, Kagoshima =

Dissolved municipality in Kagoshima prefecture, Japan

Matsuyama (松山町, Matsuyama-chō) was a town located in Soo District, Kagoshima Prefecture, Japan.

As of 2003, the town had an estimated population of 4,870 and the density of 97.77 persons per km^{2}. The total area was 49.81 km^{2}.

On January 1, 2006, Matsuyama, along with the towns of Shibushi (former) and Ariake (all from Soo District), was merged to create the city of Shibushi and no longer exists as an independent municipality.
