= Ariake, Kagoshima =

Dissolved municipality in Kagoshima prefecture, Japan

Ariake (有明町, Ariake-chō) was a town located in Soo District, Kagoshima Prefecture, Japan.

As of 2003, the town had an estimated population of 11,986 and a density of 122.24 persons per km^{2}. The total area was 98.05 km^{2}.

On January 1, 2006, Ariake, along with the towns of Shibushi (former) and Matsuyama (all from Soo District), was merged to create the city of Shibushi and no longer exists as an independent municipality.
