= Soo, Kagoshima =

Soo 曽於市
- City
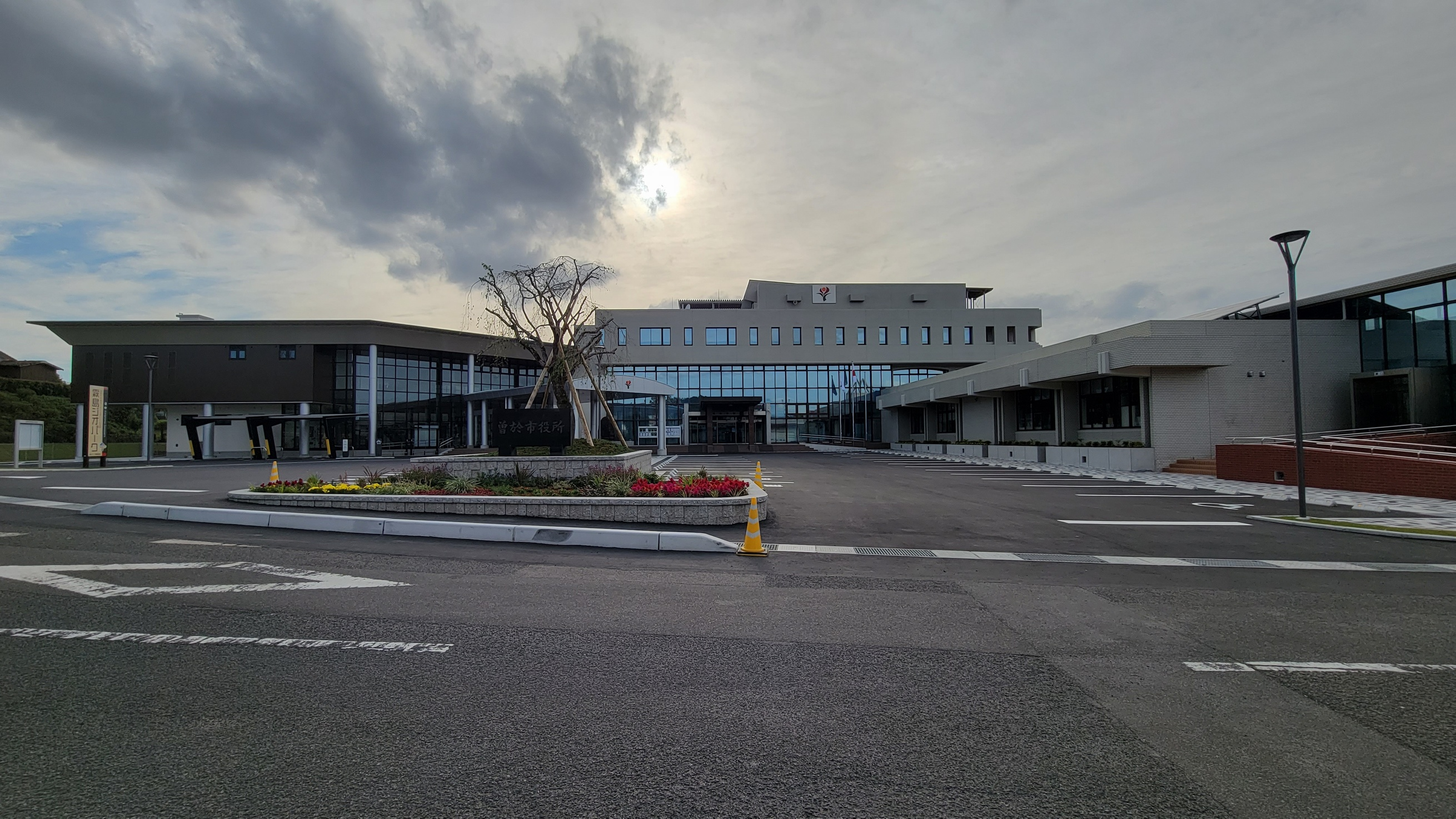
- Soo City Hall

- Flag Seal
- Location of Soo in Kagoshima Prefecture

- Location in Japan
- Coordinates: 31°39′12″N 131°1′9″E
- Country: Japan
- Region: Kyushu
- Prefecture: Kagoshima

Area
  - Total: 390.14 km^{2} (150.63 sq mi)

Population (May 1, 2024)
  - Total: 32,575
  - Density: 83.496/km^{2} (216.25/sq mi)
- Time zone: UTC+09:00 (JST)
- City hall address: 1980 Ninokata, Sueyoshi-cho, Soo-shi, Kagoshima-ken 899-8692
- Website: Official website
- Symbols
- Flower: Azalea (Tsutsuji)
- Tree: Cherry Tree

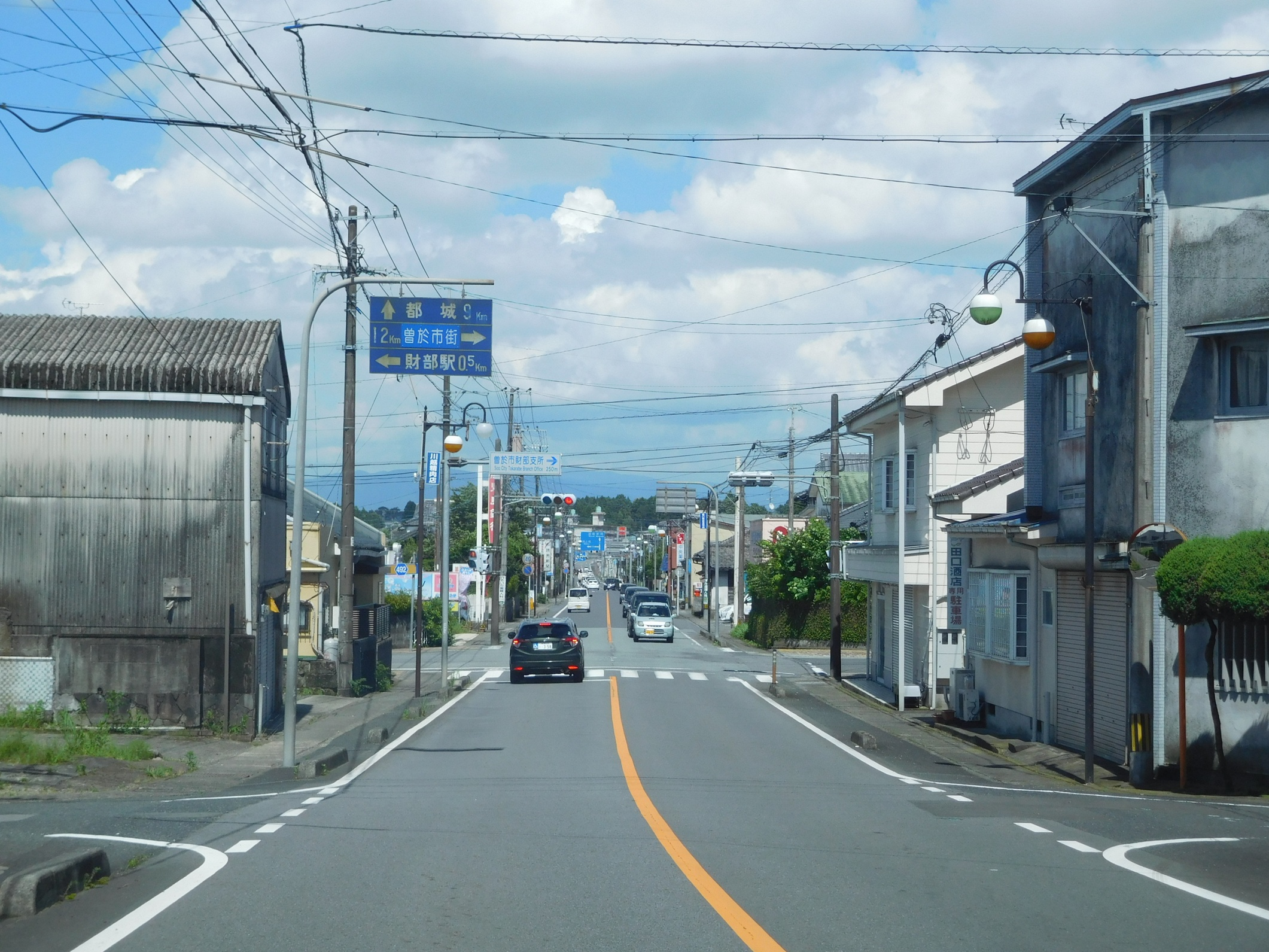
Kagoshima Pref Road 2 in Soo

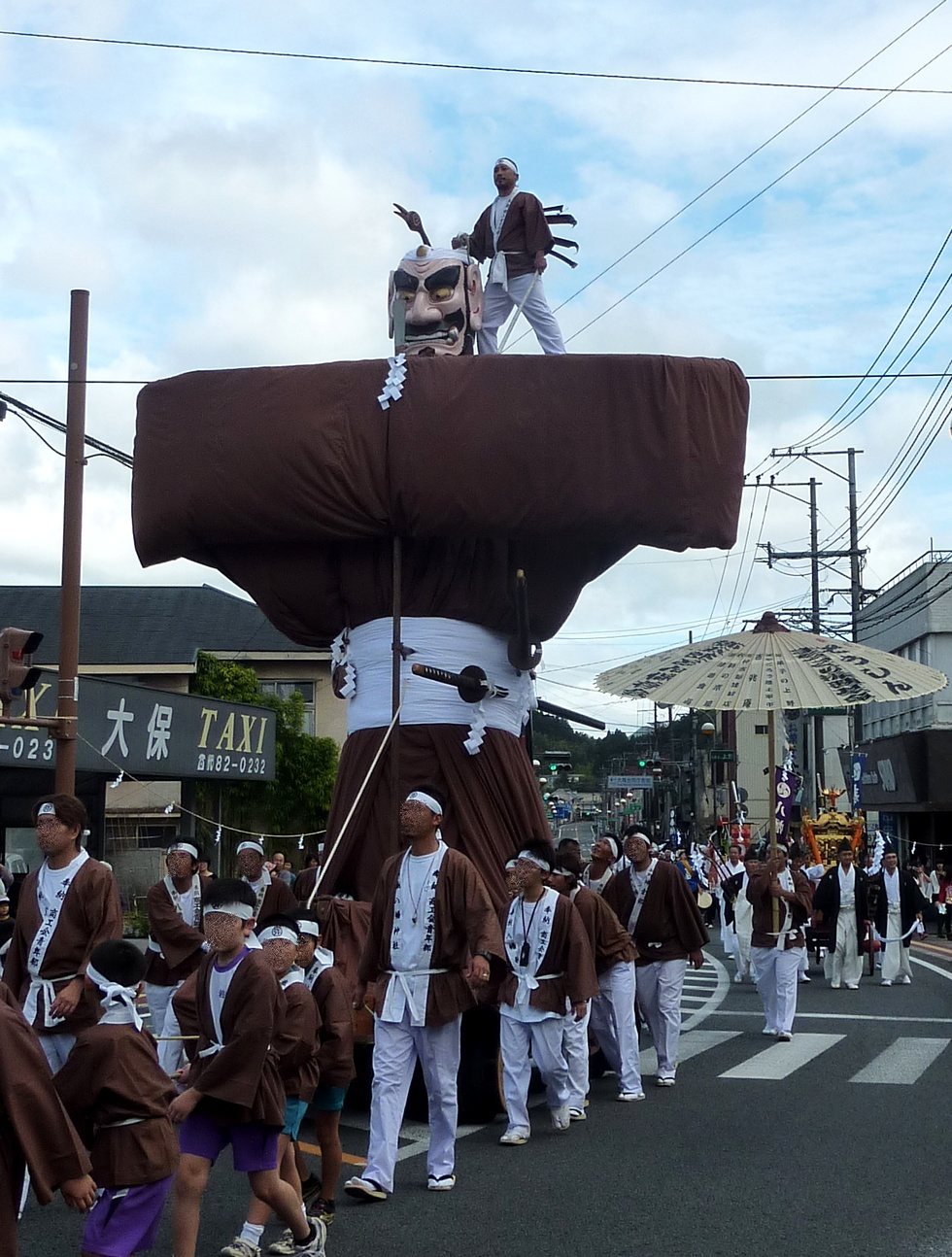
Yagorodon

Soo (曽於市, Soo-shi) is a city located in Kagoshima Prefecture, Japan. As of 1 May 2024, the city had an estimated population of 32,575 in 17252 households, and a population density of 83 persons per km^{2}. The total area of the city is 390.14 km^{2} (150.63 sq mi).

== Geography ==
Soo is located in northeastern Kagoshima Prefecture. The northern part is in the Miyakonojō Basin, the eastern part is in the Wanizuka Mountains, and the southwestern part is mainly the Shirasu Plateau and rolling hills. The entire city is located in the northern part of the Ōsumi Peninsula, and is one of the few cities in Kagoshima Prefecture that does not have a coastline. Much of the area of the city is mountainous and covered with forest. It rains, but it rarely snows; however, it occasionally receives ash from volcanoes, most notably: Shinmoedake and Sakurajima.

=== Neighboring municipalities ===
Kagoshima Prefecture

- Kanoya
- Kirishima
- Shibushi
- Ōsaki

Miyazaki Prefecture

- Miyakonojō

=== Climate ===
Soo has a humid subtropical climate (Köppen Cfa) characterized by warm summers and cool winters with light to no snowfall.

=== Demography ===
Soo is one of the many small cities in Japan that have a steadily decreasing population. Per Japanese census data, the population of Yūsui is as shown below:

Historical population
Year	Pop.	±%
1920	43,379	—
1930	50,792	+17.1%
1940	54,937	+8.2%
1950	71,519	+30.2%
1960	68,583	−4.1%
1970	54,395	−20.7%
1980	49,060	−9.8%
1990	47,492	−3.2%
2000	44,910	−5.4%
2010	39,221	−12.7%
2020	33,310	−15.1%

== History ==
The area of Soo was part of ancient Ōsumi Province. During the Edo Period the area was under the control of Kagoshima Domain. After the Meiji restoration, the villages of Takarabe, Sueyoshi, Iwakawa, Tsuneyoshi and Tsukino were established with the creation of the modern municipalities system on April 1, 1897. Sueyoshi was raised to town status in 1922, followed by Iwakawa in 1924 and Takarabe in 1926. Iwakawa, Tsueyoshi and Tsukino merged to form the town of Ōsumi in 1955. The city of Soo was established on July 1, 2005, from the merger of the towns of Ōsumi (Iwagawa), Sueyoshi and Takarabe (all from Soo District).

== Government ==
Soo has a mayor-council form of government with a directly elected mayor and a unicameral city council of 20 members. Soo contributes one member to the Kagoshima Prefectural Assembly. In terms of national politics, the city is part of the Kagoshima 4th district of the lower house of the Diet of Japan.

== Economy ==
Sueyoshi is famous throughout Japan for producing Yuzu (a citronella). Ōsumi is known for its Chinese cabbage and watermelons. Soo City in general also raises black pork and beef which is the local delicacy. Before it closed, the high school in Takarabe was an agriculture school, reflecting the importance of the agriculture industry in the area.

== Education ==
Soo has 17 public elementary schools and three public junior high schools operated by the city government and one public high school operated by the Kagoshima Prefectural Board of Education.

== Transportation ==
=== Railways ===
JR Kyushu - Nippō Main Line

■ Takarabe - Kitamata - Ōsumi-Ōkawara

=== Highways ===
- Higashikyushu Expressway
- National Route 10
- National Route 222
- National Route 269

== Local attractions ==
There are many points of interest and Festivals that can be visited in Soo City.

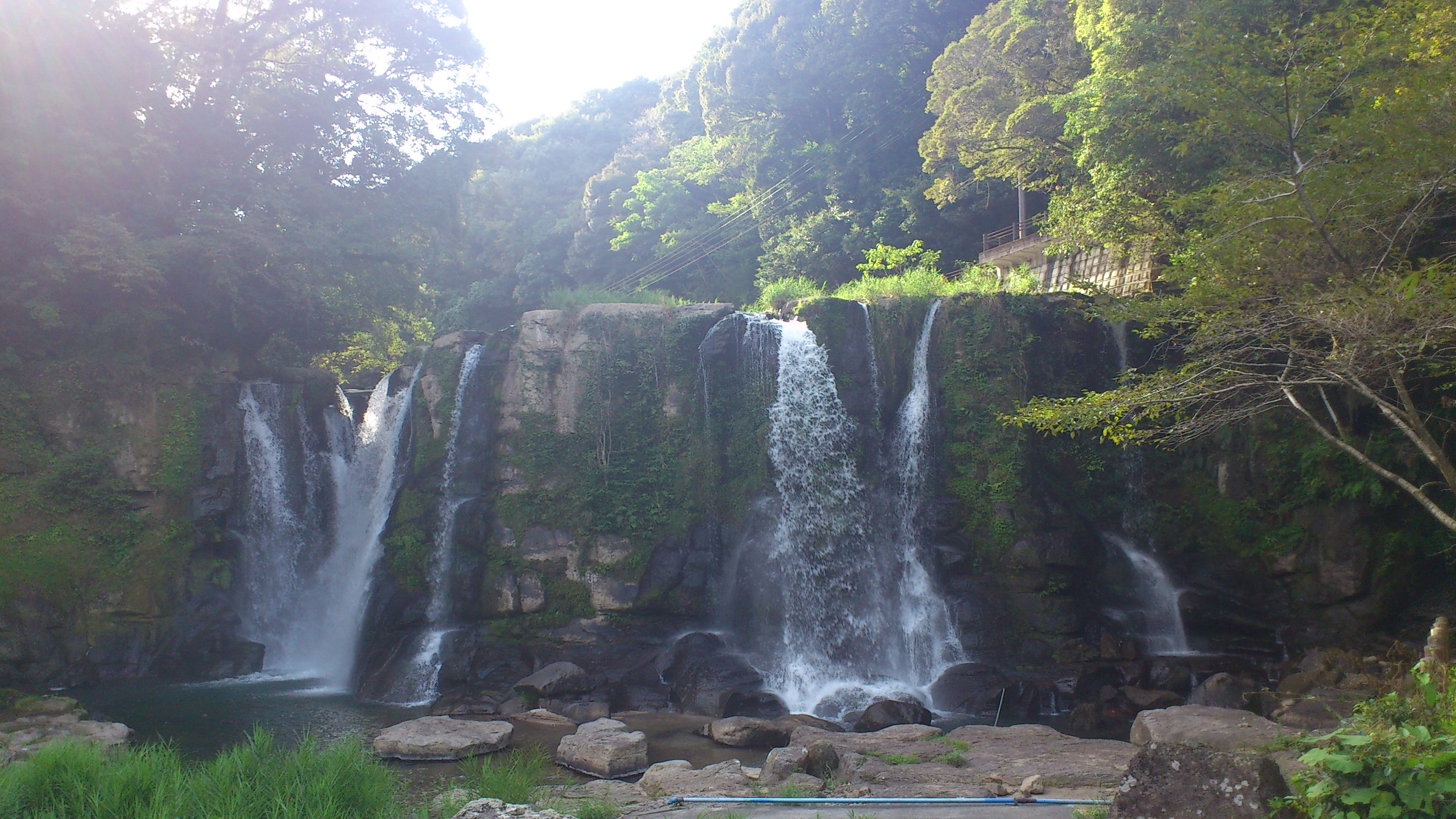
Kirihara Falls, Soo City, Iwagawa – September 2011

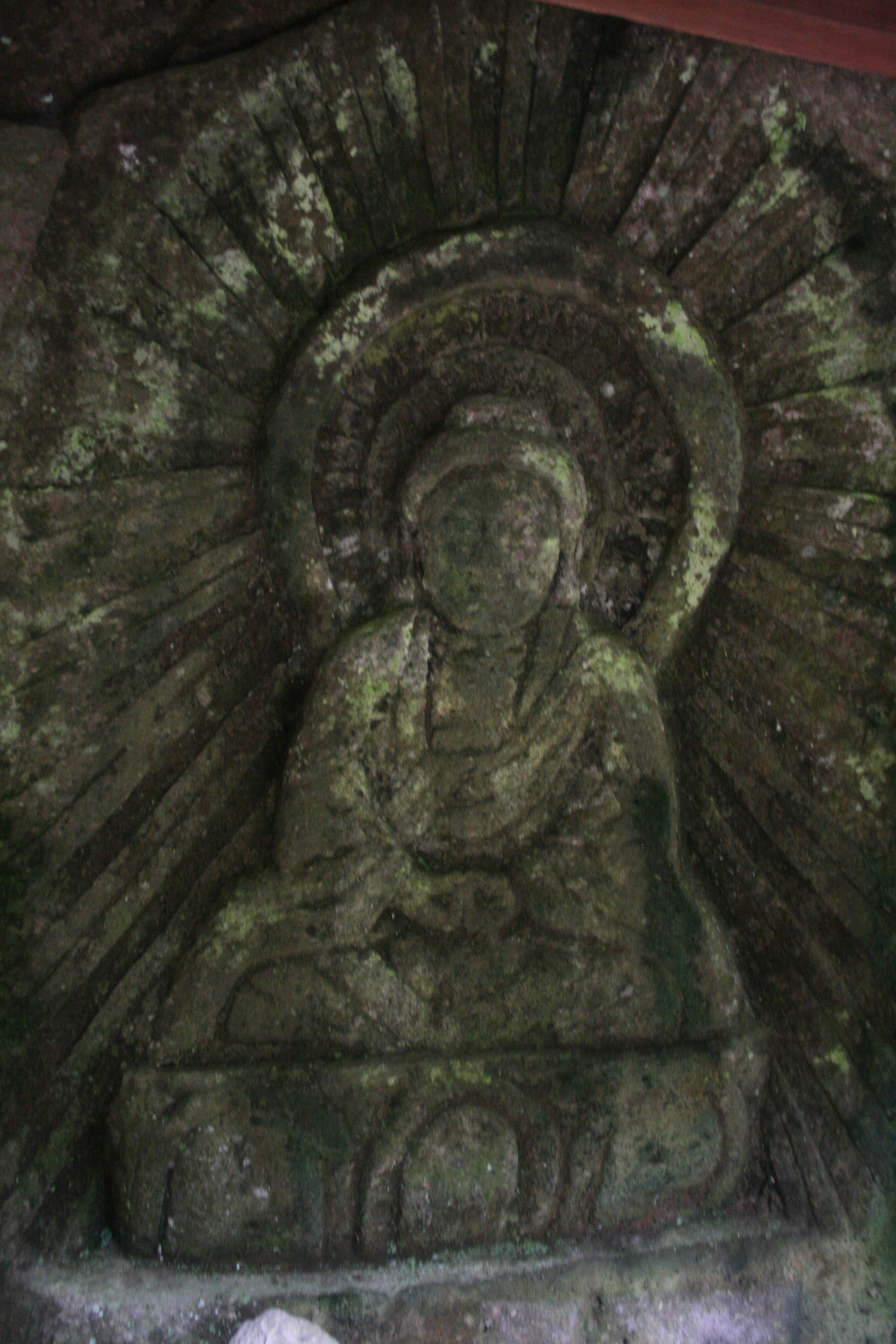
Iwaya Buddha, Soo City, Iwagawa – September 2011

=== Yagorou Statue ===
In Iwagawa there is the Legend of Yagorou, which is represented by a very tall statue on a hill near the bypass on the way to Kanoya from Miyakonojo. Near the statue is a restaurant, an onsen, and a visitors center. Also near the statue is Ōsumi's Michi no Eki where many locally grown foods and teas can be bought. In spring all of the cherry trees on the hill bloom and it is a popular spot to view them.

==== Yagorou Festival ====
Every year on November 3 there are 3 different festivals (Matsuri) dedicated to Yagoroudon. One in Soo (Ōsumi), one in Nichinan, and one in Yamanokuchi (both in Miyazaki Prefecture). The town has a smaller statue of Yagorou (just over 4 metres (13 ft) tall) that is pulled from the Hachiman Shrine (八幡神社, Hachiman-jinjya) through town. This festival is called the Yagorou Festival or the Yagorodon Festival.

The mobile statue of Yagorou pulled through Ōsumi is the second largest of the three Yagorou festivals. The largest is in Nichinan (just over 7 metres (23 ft) tall), and the smallest is in Yamanokuchi. It is said that there were 3 Yagoroudon brothers, hence the three different locations of festivals (one for each brother).

=== Ookawara Gorge ===
Ookawara Gorge (大川原峡, Ookawara-kyou) has campsites and a little village where cabins can be rented. It is in Takarabe, and it hosts a waterfall called Kirihara Falls (桐原の滝 "Kirihara-no-taki") that is lit up at night. There are also many scenic ponds at the base of the waterfall with many places to picnic.

=== Iwaya Buddha ===
One of the eight views of Kannon that can be seen in Soo (according to the sign at the trail head down to the Iwaya Buddha). It was carved hundreds of years ago and is reached by climbing down many stairs to a cliff face above a river.

=== Mizo no Kuchi ===
Mizo no Kuchi Douketsu (溝ノ口洞穴, Mizo-no-kuchi-douketsu) is located in Takarabe and is a tunnel made long ago through erosion. it is 13.8 metres (45 ft) tall and 8.6 metres (28 ft) long.

==== Festival ====
Every year on the Sunday closest to the Buddha's birthday (April 8) the Mizo no Kuchi Iwaana Festival (溝ノ口岩穴祭, Mizo-no-kuchi-iwaana-matsuri) is held at the natural tunnel. At the festival school children dance through the tunnel in traditional costumes.

=== Yabusame Festival ===
Every year on November 23 at Sumiyoshi Shrine (住吉神社, Sumiyoshi-Jinjya) there is a Yabusame festival. Originally, a student from the local junior high school was selected three months prior to the festival. Then he trained to shoot arrows on horseback for the festival. In many cases he had never touched a horse before he was selected, let alone ridden a horse before. How many shots he made was supposed to show how good the harvest will be for the year.

For at least the past 4 years, however, two girls have been the riders/shooters for the festival. Starting when they were in Jr. High school, they practice riding and shooting a few months before the festival. A third girl, currently a 6th grade student, has been shooting at the past two festivals, and a 5th grade boy began riding, but not shooting, at last year's festival.

=== Onioi Festival ===
In Sueyoshi in Soo every January 7 at Kumano Shrine (熊野神社, Kumano-Jinjya) there is an Onioi (鬼追い, Onioi). Onioi is a festival or ceremony in which the demons are driven out in order to let good luck in.
