= Shibushi, Kagoshima =

Shibushi 志布志市
- City
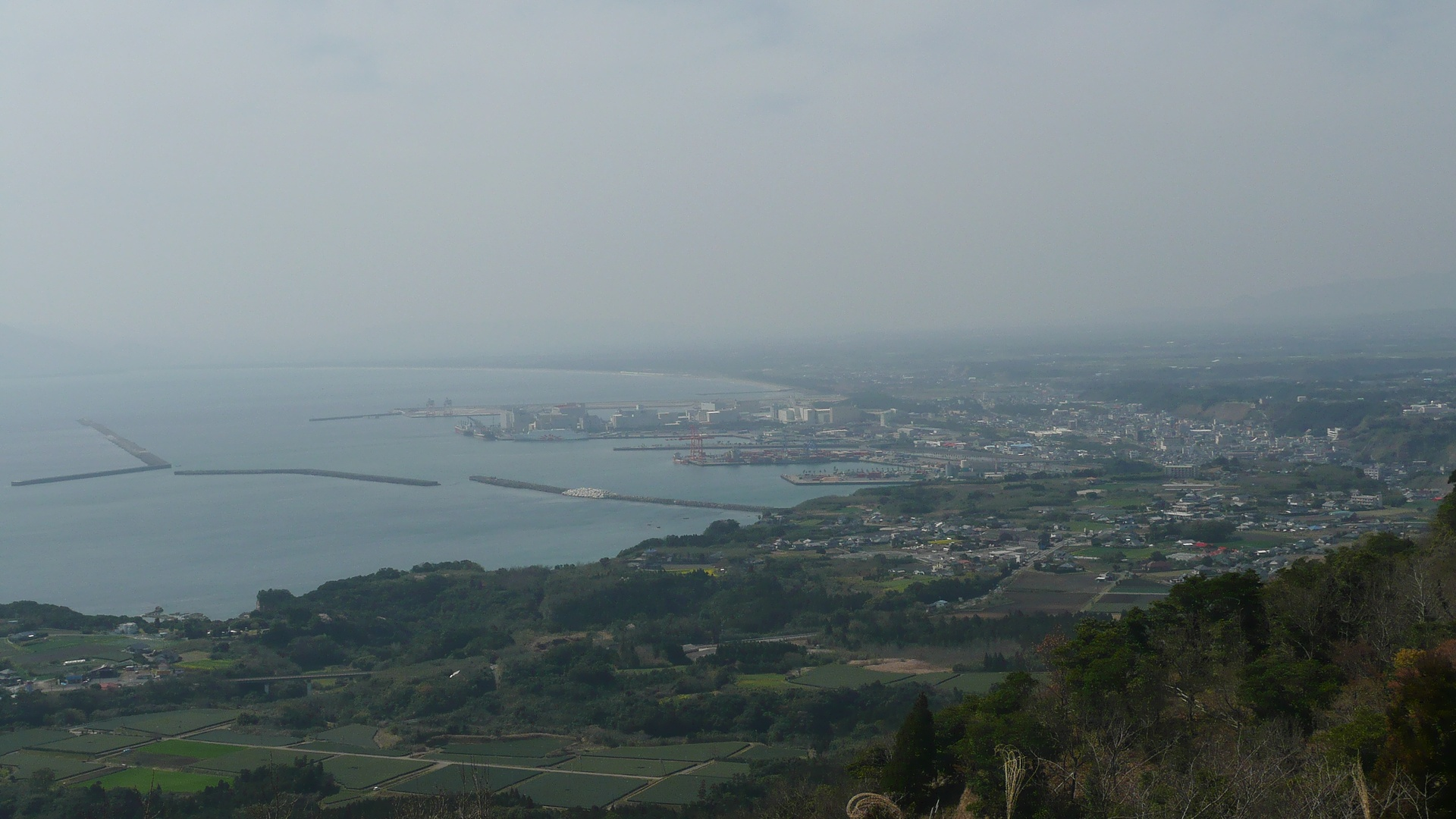
- View of Downtown Shibushi and Shibushi Port, from Shibushi International Forest Park

- Flag Chapter
- Location of Shibushi in Kagoshima Prefecture

- Location in Japan
- Coordinates: 31°28′38″N 131°06′0″E
- Country: Japan
- Region: Kyushu
- Prefecture: Kagoshima

Government
  - Mayor: Sumiyuki Shimohira (since February 2018)

Area
  - Total: 290.21 km^{2} (112.05 sq mi)

Population (April 30, 2024)
  - Total: 28,889
  - Density: 99.545/km^{2} (257.82/sq mi)
- Time zone: UTC+09:00 (JST)
- City hall address: Shibushi 2-1-1, Shibushi-cho, Shibushi-shi, Kagoshima-ken 〒899-7192
- Climate: Cfa
- Website: Official website
- Symbols
- Flower: Sunflower
- Tree: Livistona

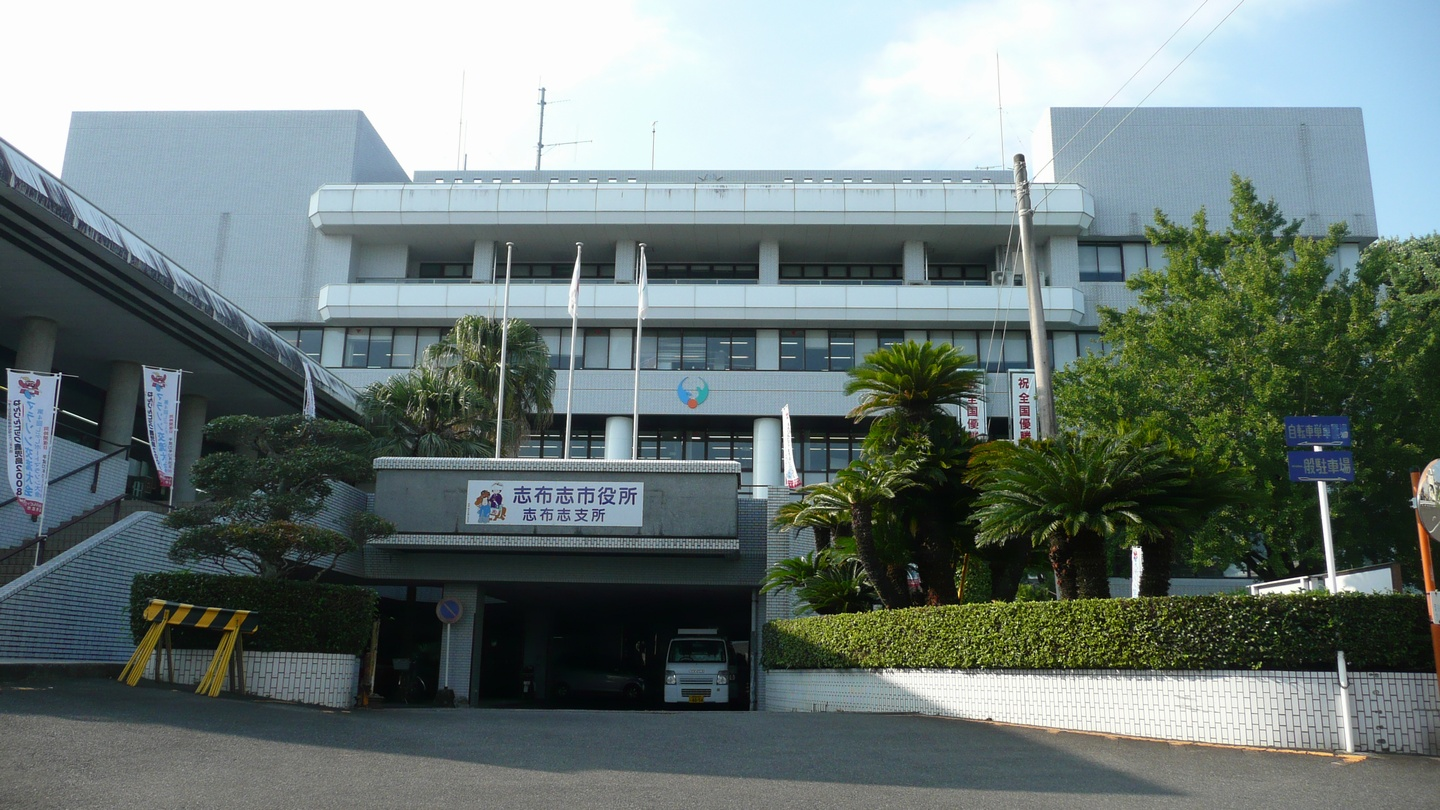
Shibushi City Office Shibushi Branch

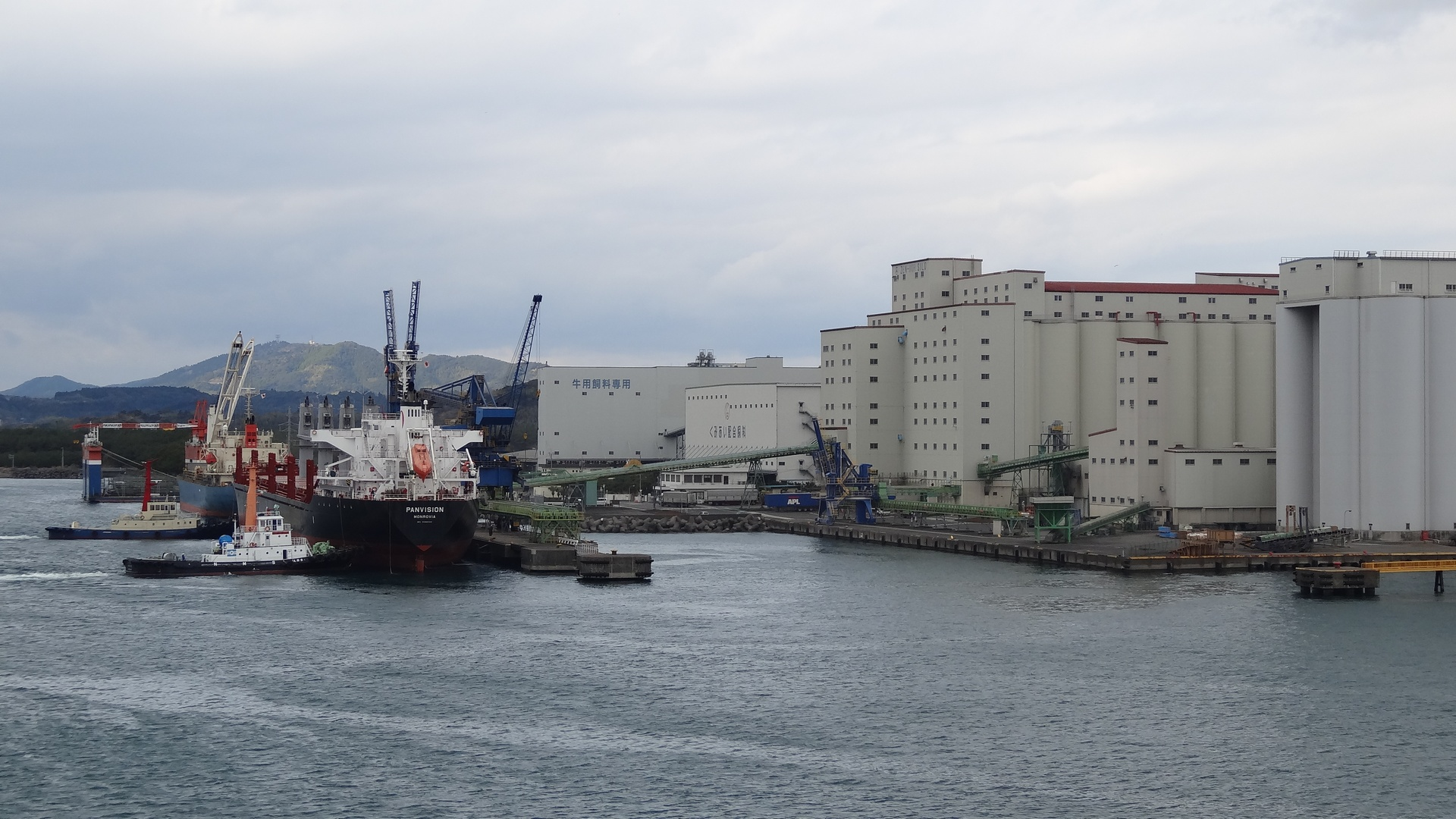
Shibushi Port

Shibushi (志布志市, Shibushi-shi) is a city located in Kagoshima Prefecture, Japan. As of 30 April 2024, the city had an estimated population of 28,889 in 15135 households, and a population density of 100 persons per km^{2}. The total area of the city is 290.21 km^{2} (112.05 sq mi).

== Geography ==
Shibushi is located in the eastern part of Kagoshima Prefecture, at the base of the Ōsumi Peninsula, and borders Miyazaki Prefecture. The south side of the city area faces Shibushi Bay.

=== Neighboring municipalities ===
Kagoshima Prefecture

- Ōsaki
- Soo

Miyazaki Prefecture

- Kushima
- Miyakonojō

=== Climate ===
Shibushi has a humid subtropical climate (Köppen climate classification Cfa) with hot summers and mild winters. Precipitation is significant throughout the year, and is heavier in summer, especially the months of June and July. The average annual temperature in Shibushi is 17.1 °C (62.8 °F). The average annual rainfall is 2,457.9 mm (96.77 in) with June as the wettest month. The temperatures are highest on average in August, at around 26.7 °C (80.1 °F), and lowest in January, at around 7.2 °C (45.0 °F). Its record high is 37.2 °C (99.0 °F), reached on 30 July 2026, and its record low is −6.9 °C (19.6 °F), reached on 27 February 1981.

Climate data for Shibushi (1991–2020 normals, extremes 1977–present)
| Month | Jan | Feb | Mar | Apr | May | Jun | Jul | Aug | Sep | Oct | Nov | Dec | Year |
|---|---|---|---|---|---|---|---|---|---|---|---|---|---|
| Record high °C (°F) | 23.9 (75.0) | 25.1 (77.2) | 29.7 (85.5) | 29.7 (85.5) | 31.7 (89.1) | 33.4 (92.1) | 37.2 (99.0) | 36.7 (98.1) | 35.7 (96.3) | 32.5 (90.5) | 29.4 (84.9) | 25.5 (77.9) | 37.2 (99.0) |
| Mean daily maximum °C (°F) | 13.5 (56.3) | 14.8 (58.6) | 17.6 (63.7) | 21.7 (71.1) | 25.0 (77.0) | 26.6 (79.9) | 30.8 (87.4) | 31.6 (88.9) | 29.4 (84.9) | 25.3 (77.5) | 20.4 (68.7) | 15.4 (59.7) | 22.7 (72.8) |
| Daily mean °C (°F) | 7.2 (45.0) | 8.5 (47.3) | 11.6 (52.9) | 15.8 (60.4) | 19.5 (67.1) | 22.5 (72.5) | 26.3 (79.3) | 26.7 (80.1) | 24.2 (75.6) | 19.4 (66.9) | 14.2 (57.6) | 9.1 (48.4) | 17.1 (62.8) |
| Mean daily minimum °C (°F) | 2.2 (36.0) | 3.3 (37.9) | 6.3 (43.3) | 10.5 (50.9) | 14.9 (58.8) | 19.3 (66.7) | 23.0 (73.4) | 23.4 (74.1) | 20.6 (69.1) | 15.0 (59.0) | 9.4 (48.9) | 4.0 (39.2) | 12.7 (54.8) |
| Record low °C (°F) | −6.8 (19.8) | −6.9 (19.6) | −4.0 (24.8) | −0.2 (31.6) | 5.5 (41.9) | 11.3 (52.3) | 15.4 (59.7) | 17.0 (62.6) | 10.3 (50.5) | 3.2 (37.8) | −1.7 (28.9) | −4.9 (23.2) | −6.9 (19.6) |
| Average precipitation mm (inches) | 72.5 (2.85) | 112.3 (4.42) | 171.0 (6.73) | 191.9 (7.56) | 218.0 (8.58) | 556.4 (21.91) | 365.5 (14.39) | 225.3 (8.87) | 254.5 (10.02) | 134.7 (5.30) | 111.5 (4.39) | 78.9 (3.11) | 2,457.9 (96.77) |
| Average precipitation days (≥ 1.0 mm) | 7.3 | 8.5 | 12.0 | 10.5 | 10.4 | 16.7 | 11.7 | 11.7 | 11.1 | 7.9 | 8.0 | 6.6 | 122.4 |
| Mean monthly sunshine hours | 170.7 | 158.2 | 178.2 | 186.0 | 183.1 | 109.5 | 198.6 | 224.5 | 174.7 | 181.6 | 165.1 | 168.7 | 2,102.1 |
Source: Japan Meteorological Agency

== Demographics ==
Per Japanese census data, the population of Shibushi in 2020 is 29,329 people. Shibushi's population has been in slow decline since the census began in 1950, although it rebounded in the 1955 and 1975 censuses. As of 2020, the town's population is only 60% of what it was in the 1950s.

Historical population
| Year | Pop. | ±% |
|---|---|---|
| 1950 | 50,726 | — |
| 1955 | 53,199 | +4.9% |
| 1960 | 51,766 | −2.7% |
| 1965 | 46,801 | −9.6% |
| 1970 | 40,812 | −12.8% |
| 1975 | 37,930 | −7.1% |
| 1980 | 38,404 | +1.2% |
| 1985 | 38,387 | −0.0% |
| 1990 | 37,316 | −2.8% |
| 1995 | 36,694 | −1.7% |
| 2000 | 35,966 | −2.0% |
| 2005 | 34,770 | −3.3% |
| 2010 | 33,041 | −5.0% |
| 2015 | 31,479 | −4.7% |
| 2020 | 29,329 | −6.8% |
Shibushi population statistics

== History ==
The area of Shibushi was part of ancient Hyūga Province, and developed as the port of Shimazu-shō, the vast shōen landed manor in Ōsumi, Satsuma, and Hyūga that was opened at the end of the Heian period, and which evolved into Satsuma Domain in the Edo period. After the Meiji restoration, the villages of Shibushi and Matsuyama were established with the creation of the modern municipalities system on April 1, 1889. Shibushi was raised to town status on July 1, 1913, and Matsuyama on April 1, 1958. The city of Shibushi was established on January 1, 2006, from the merger of the former town of Shibushi, with the towns of Ariake and Matsuyama (all from Soo District).

== Government ==
Shibushi has a mayor-council form of government with a directly elected mayor and a unicameral city council of 20 members. Shibushi, collectively with the town of Ōsaki contributes one member to the Kagoshima Prefectural Assembly. In terms of national politics, the city is part of the Kagoshima 4th district of the lower house of the Diet of Japan.

== Economy ==
Shibushi has a primary economy centering on agriculture, fishing, forestry and food processing.

== Education ==
Shibushi has 16 public elementary schools and five public junior high schools operated by the city government and one public high school operated by the Kagoshima Prefectural Board of Education. There is also one private high school.

== Transportation ==
=== Railways ===
JR Kyushu – Nichinan Line

■ Ōsumi-Natsui – Shibushi

=== Highways ===
- Higashi-Kyushu Expressway
- National Route 220
- National Route 269

== Local attractions ==
- Shibushi Castle (Historic Site)

== Notable people from Shibushi ==
- Chiyomaru Kazuki, sumo wrestler
- Chiyoōtori Yūki, sumo wrestler
