= Ōsaki, Kagoshima =

Ōsaki 大崎町
- Town
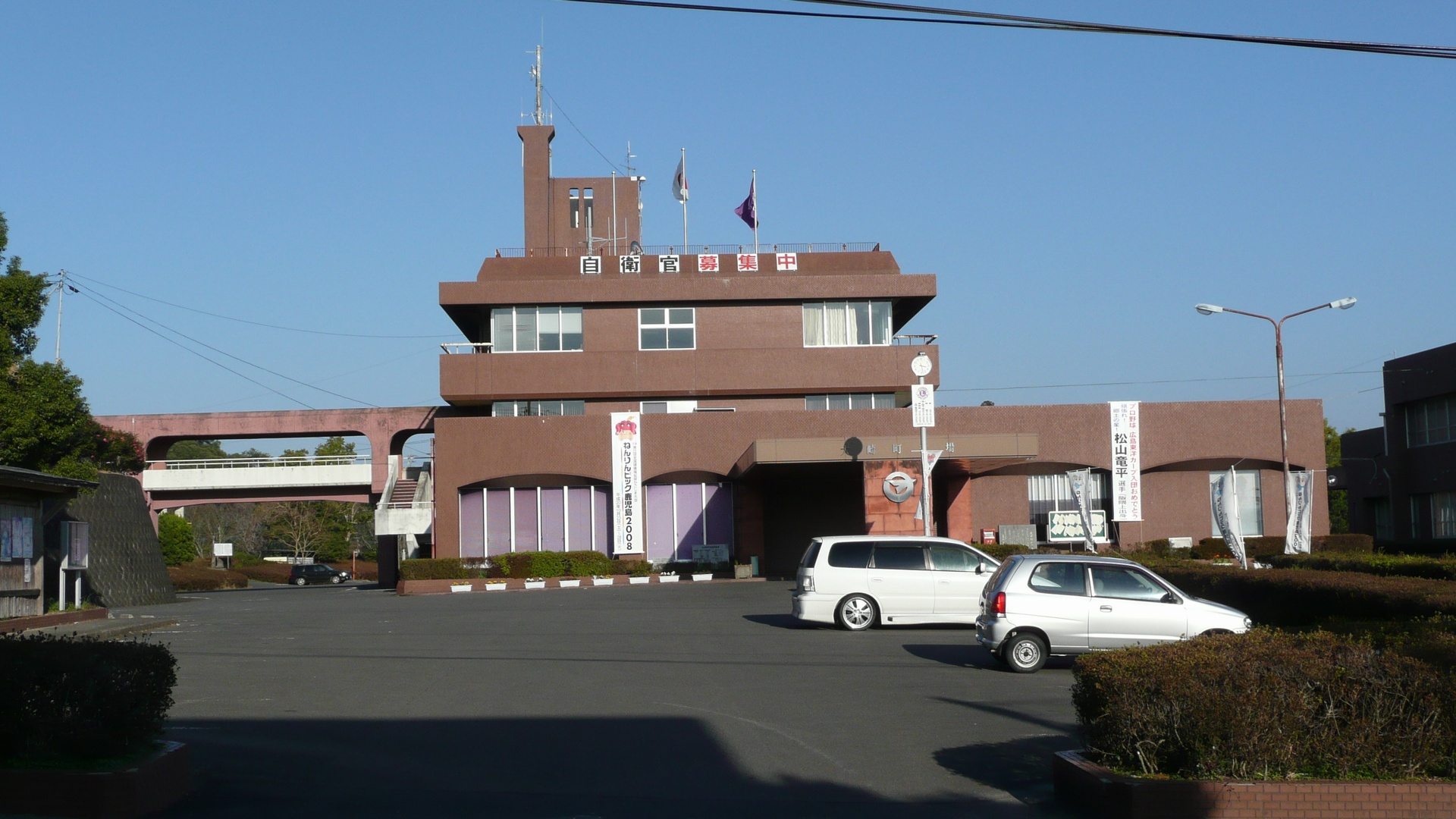
- Ōsaki Town Office

- Flag Seal
- Location of Ōsaki in Kagoshima Prefecture

- Location in Japan
- Coordinates: 31°25′45″N 131°00′21″E
- Country: Japan
- Region: Kyushu
- Prefecture: Kagoshima
- District: Soo

Government
  - Mayor: Higashi Yushiro

Area
  - Total: 100.64 km^{2} (38.86 sq mi)

Population (April 1, 2024)
  - Total: 12,006
  - Density: 119.30/km^{2} (308.98/sq mi)
- Time zone: UTC+09:00 (JST)
- City hall address: 1029 Karishuku, Ōsaki-cho, Soo-gun, Kagoshima-ken 899-7305
- Website: Official website
- Symbols
- Flower: Camellia sasanqua
- Tree: Camphora officinarum

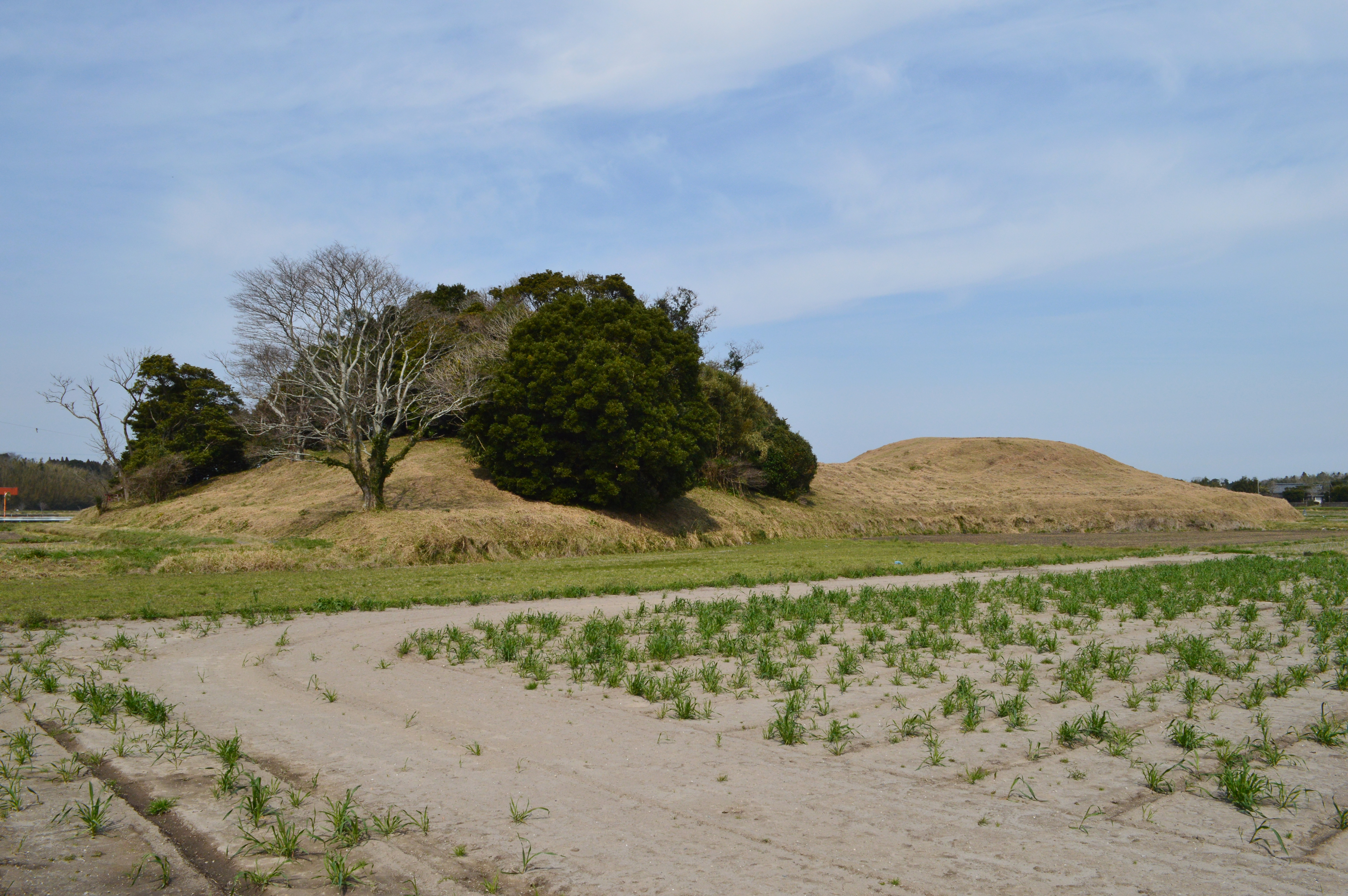
Yokose Kofun

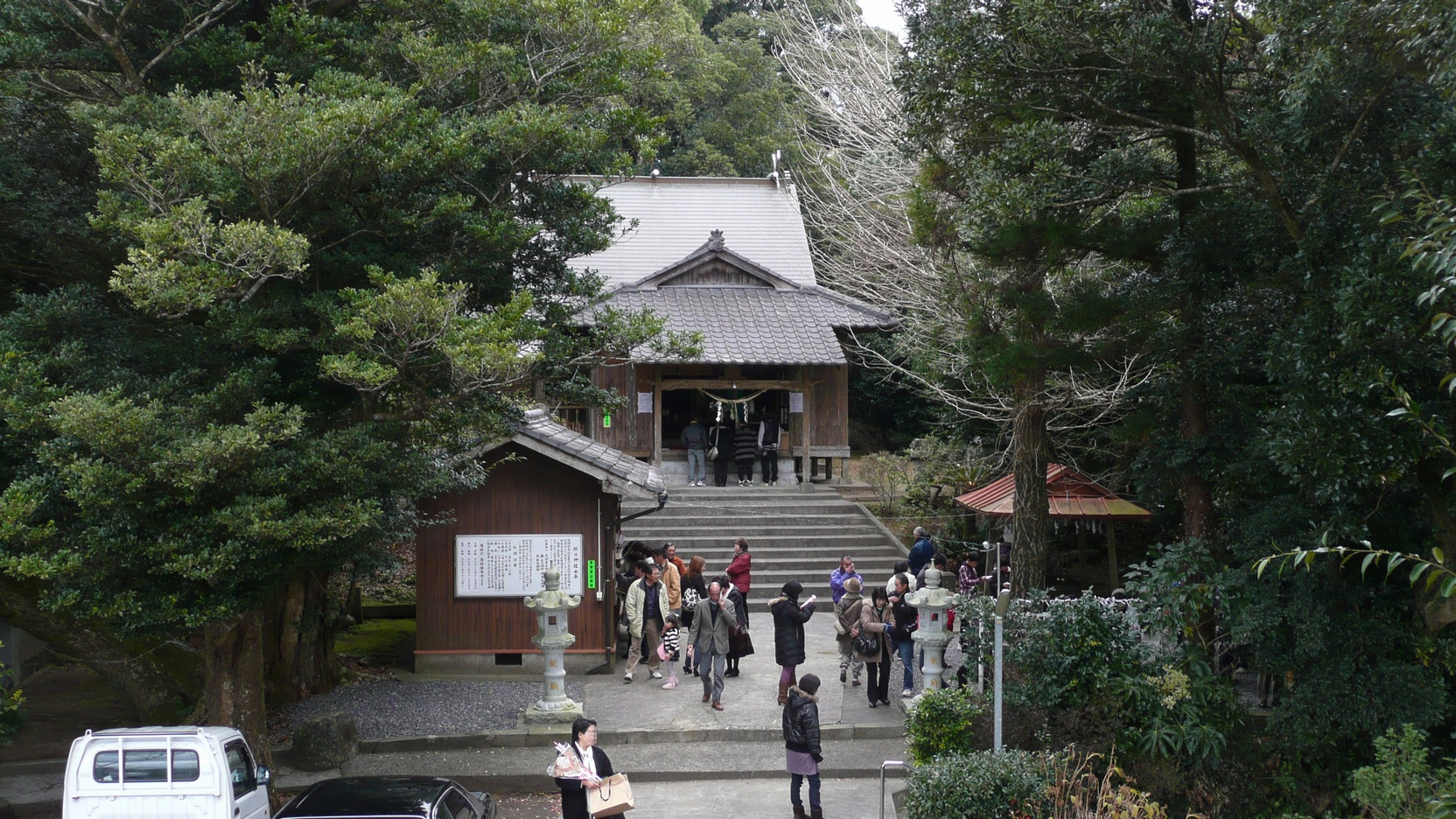
Teruhi Shrine

Ōsaki (大崎町, Ōsaki-chō) is a town located in Soo District, Kagoshima Prefecture, Japan. As of 1 April 2024, the town had an estimated population of 12,006 in 6545 households, and a population density of 120 persons per km^{2}. The total area of the town is 100.64 km^{2} (38.86 sq mi).

== Geography ==
Ōsaki is located in the eastern part of the Ōsumi Peninsula in Kagoshima Prefecture. Part of the town area is an enclave surrounded by Shibushi City, and there is also an enclave of Shibushi City within the town area. The town faces Shibushi Bay.

=== Neighboring municipalities ===
Kagoshima Prefecture

- Higashikushira
- Kanoya
- Shibushi
- Soo

=== Climate ===
Ōsaki has a humid subtropical climate (Köppen Cfa) characterized by warm summers and cool winters with light to no snowfall. The average annual temperature in Ōsaki is 17.8 °C. The average annual rainfall is 2294 mm with September as the wettest month. The temperatures are highest on average in August, at around 26.9 °C, and lowest in January, at around 8.3 °C.

=== Demographics ===
Per Japanese census data, the population of Ōsaki is as shown below:

Historical population
Year	Pop.	±%
1920	14,390	—
1930	16,083	+11.8%
1940	17,458	+8.5%
1950	23,604	+35.2%
1960	23,922	+1.3%
1970	18,676	−21.9%
1980	17,527	−6.2%
1990	16,828	−4.0%
2000	16,018	−4.8%
2010	14,215	−11.3%
2020	12,385	−12.9%

== History ==
The area of Ōsaki was part of ancient Hyūga Province. During the Edo Period, the area was part of the holdings of Satsuma Domain. The village of Ōsaki was established on May 1, 1889 with the creation of the modern municipalities system. Ōsaki was raised to town status on January 1, 1936.

== Government ==
Ōsaki has a mayor-council form of government with a directly elected mayor and a unicameral town council of 12 members. Ōsaki, collectively with the city of Shibushi, contributes one member to the Kagoshima Prefectural Assembly. In terms of national politics, the town is part of the Kagoshima 4th district of the lower house of the Diet of Japan.

== Economy ==
The economy of Ōsaki is based largely on agriculture.

== Education ==
Ōsaki has six public elementary high schools and one public junior high school operated by the town government. The town does not have a high school.

== Transportation ==
=== Railways ===
Ōsaki does not have any passenger railway service. The nearest train station is Shibushi Station on the JR Kyushu Nichinan Line.

=== Highways ===
- Higashi-Kyushu Expressway
- National Route 220
- National Route 269

== Local attractions ==
- Yokose Kofun, National Historic Site

== Notable people from Ōsaki ==
- Kōsuke Fukudome, baseball player
