= Ōsumi Nanbu Prefectural Natural Park =

Natural park in Kagoshima prefecture, Japan

- 大隅南部県立自然公園
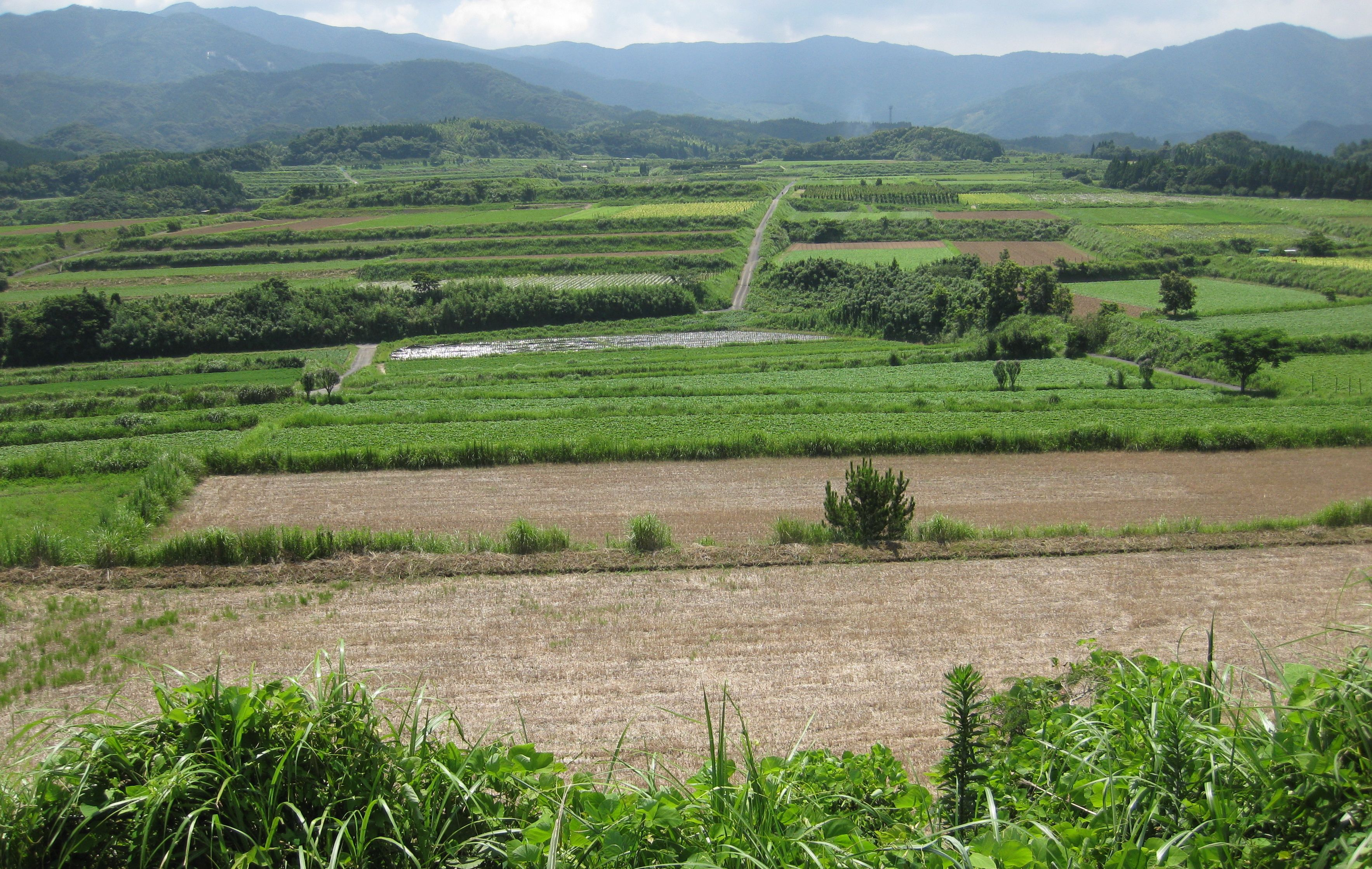
- Ōnejime Daichi on the Ōsumi Peninsula
- Interactive map of Ōsumi Nanbu Prefectural Natural Park
- Location: Kagoshima Prefecture, Japan
- Area: 13.15 km^{2} (5.08 sq mi)
- Established: 1 June 1977

Ōsumi Nanbu Prefectural Natural Park (大隅南部県立自然公園, Ōsumi Nanbu kenritsu shizen kōen) is a Prefectural Natural Park in southeast Kagoshima Prefecture, Japan. Established in 1977, the park spans the municipalities of Kinkō, Kimotsuki, and Minamiōsumi.

== See also ==
- National Parks of Japan
