= Uchinoura =

Uchinoura may refer to:

- Uchinoura, Kagoshima, a former town in Japan, now part of Kimotsuki.
- Uchinoura Space Center, Japan's rocket launch facility close to Uchinoura.
