= Hongo Tokihisa =

Japanese samurai

Hongō Tokihisa (北郷 時久, 1530 – March 1, 1596) was a Japanese samurai of the Azuchi-Momoyama period, who served the Shimazu clan.

In 1573, Tokihisa defeated an attack led by the Kimotsuki clan. In 1578 he would suppress a rebel coalition of former Itō retainers.

After Toyotomi Hideyoshi had invaded the lands of Kyūshū in 1587 and forced the Shimazu into surrender by that same year, Tokihisa acted as Hideyoshi's hostage, henceforth placed at Miyanojo castle in Hyuga Province, on the condition of his cooperation.

He has a son, Hongo Tadatora, who also served the Shimazu clan.
