= Hongo Tadatora =

Samurai (1556–1594)

Hongō Tadatora (北郷 忠虎; 1556 – January 24, 1594) was a Japanese samurai of the Azuchi–Momoyama period, who served the Shimazu clan. He was the son of Hongo Tokihisa, another Shimazu vassal.

In 1573, Tadatora and his father held Kumamoto Castle against an attack by the Kimotsuki family. After this, Tadatora went on to support the Shimazu in each of their conflicts against the rival Ryūzōji and Ōtomo forces.

In 1592, he securing for himself a part in Toyotomi Hideyoshi's 1st Korean Campaign. Later in 1593, Tadatora died in Korea, at Karashima island (modern-day Kadok-do).
