= Kanetsugu =

- Gender: Male

Origin
- Origin: Japanese
- Meaning: Different meanings depending on the kanji used

Kanetsugu (written: 兼嗣 or 兼続) is a masculine Japanese given name. Notable people with the name include:

- Kimotsuki Kanetsugu (肝付 兼続; 1511–1566), Japanese samurai
- Konoe Kanetsugu (近衛 兼嗣; 1360–1388), Japanese kugyō
- Naoe Kanetsugu (直江 兼続; 1559–1620), Japanese samurai
