= Daiyū Tatsumi =

Sumo wrestler

Personal information
- Native name: 大雄 辰實
- Born: Tatsumi Yanagida; 27 May 1940 (age 86) Ōnejime, Kagoshima, Japan
- Height: 1.79 m (5 ft 10 1/2 in)
- Weight: 113 kg (249 lb)

Sport
- Sport: Sumo
- Retired: September, 1972
- Heya: Izutsu
- Record: 614-596-4
- Debut: May, 1956
- Highest rank: Maegashira 1 (September, 1968)
- Elder name: Kabutoyama
- Championships: 2 (Jūryō)
- Updated on June 2020

Daiyū Tatsumi (born 27 May 1940 as Tatsumi Yanagida) is a former sumo wrestler from Ōnejime, Kagoshima, Japan. He made his professional debut in May 1956 and reached the top division in May 1963. His highest rank was maegashira 1. Upon retirement from active competition he became an elder in the Japan Sumo Association under the name Kabutoyama, coaching at Izutsu stable. In 1989 he branched out from Izutsu and started up Kabutoyama stable, which he ran until it folded in December 2002. He became a coach at Minato stable, and worked there until he reached the Sumo Association's mandatory retirement age of 65.

== Career record ==
- The Kyushu tournament was first held in 1957, and the Nagoya tournament in 1958.

Daiyū Tatsumi
Year	January Hatsu basho, Tokyo	March Haru basho, Osaka	May Natsu basho, Tokyo	July Nagoya basho, Nagoya	September Aki basho, Tokyo	November Kyūshū basho, Fukuoka
1956	x	x	(Maezumo)	Not held	West Jonokuchi #27; 5–3	Not held
1957	East Jonidan #90; 5–3	West Jonidan #60; 7–1	West Jonidan #2; 6–2	Not held	East Sandanme #64; 6–2	East Sandanme #38; 5–3
1958	West Sandanme #26; 6–2	West Sandanme #8; 6–2	East Makushita #76; 3–5	West Makushita #77; 4–4	West Makushita #74; 5–3	East Makushita #62; 5–3
1959	East Makushita #50; 5–3	West Makushita #44; 6–2	East Makushita #32; 6–2	East Makushita #14; 3–5	East Makushita #16; 3–5	East Makushita #19; 7–1
1960	West Makushita #8; 4–4	West Makushita #5; 5–3	East Makushita #2; 6–2	West Jūryō #18; 8–7	East Jūryō #13; 6–9	West Jūryō #17; 10–5
1961	East Jūryō #11; 4–11	West Jūryō #17; 4–11	West Makushita #7; 3–4	East Makushita #10; 3–4	East Makushita #11; 3–4	West Makushita #13; 3–4
1962	East Makushita #20; 5–2	West Makushita #9; 5–2	West Makushita #2; 4–3	East Makushita #1; 4–3	West Jūryō #18; 8–7	West Jūryō #16; 8–7
1963	West Jūryō #9; 9–6	West Jūryō #4; 12–3–PP; Champion	West Maegashira #12; 7–8	West Maegashira #14; 4–11	East Jūryō #4; 7–8	East Jūryō #5; 8–7
1964	East Jūryō #2; 7–8	East Jūryō #4; 8–7	East Jūryō #4; 7–8	West Jūryō #5; 6–9	West Jūryō #8; 10–5	East Jūryō #3; 5–10
1965	West Jūryō #6; 9–6	East Jūryō #5; 6–5–4	West Jūryō #7; 8–7	East Jūryō #5; 10–5	East Jūryō #1; 10–5	West Maegashira #12; 8–7
1966	East Maegashira #12; 8–7	East Maegashira #11; 9–6	East Maegashira #8; 7–8	East Maegashira #9; 8–7	East Maegashira #6; 8–7	East Maegashira #4; 5–10
1967	West Maegashira #8; 10–5	West Maegashira #2; 3–12	West Maegashira #10; 7–8	East Maegashira #10; 7–8	West Maegashira #12; 9–6	East Maegashira #6; 6–9
1968	West Maegashira #8; 8–7	West Maegashira #6; 6–9	East Maegashira #9; 8–7	East Maegashira #5; 9–6	East Maegashira #1; 5–10	West Maegashira #5; 6–9
1969	West Maegashira #7; 9–6	West Maegashira #3; 5–10	East Maegashira #7; 7–8	West Maegashira #8; 9–6	West Maegashira #3; 5–10	East Maegashira #8; 10–5
1970	West Maegashira #2; 5–10	East Maegashira #5; 8–7	East Maegashira #4; 4–11	West Maegashira #8; 7–8	West Maegashira #8; 8–7	East Maegashira #4; 5–10
1971	West Maegashira #7; 7–8	West Maegashira #8; 8–7	East Maegashira #5; 5–10	East Maegashira #10; 9–6	West Maegashira #4; 7–8	West Maegashira #5; 6–9
1972	West Maegashira #6; 8–7	East Maegashira #5; 7–8	East Maegashira #7; 3–12	East Jūryō #4; 10–5–PP; Champion	West Maegashira #12; Retired; 6–9	x
Record given as wins–losses–absences Top division champion Top division runner-up Retired Lower divisions Non-participation Sanshō key: F=Fighting spirit; O=Outstanding performance; T=Technique Also shown: ★=Kinboshi; P=Playoff(s); Divisions: Makuuchi — Jūryō — Makushita — Sandanme — Jonidan — Jonokuchi Makuuchi ranks: Yokozuna — Ōzeki — Sekiwake — Komusubi — Maegashira

== See also ==
- Glossary of sumo terms
- List of past sumo wrestlers
- List of sumo tournament second division champions
