= Tsukazaki Kofun Cluster =

Japanese burial mound

- 塚崎古墳群 (Japanese)
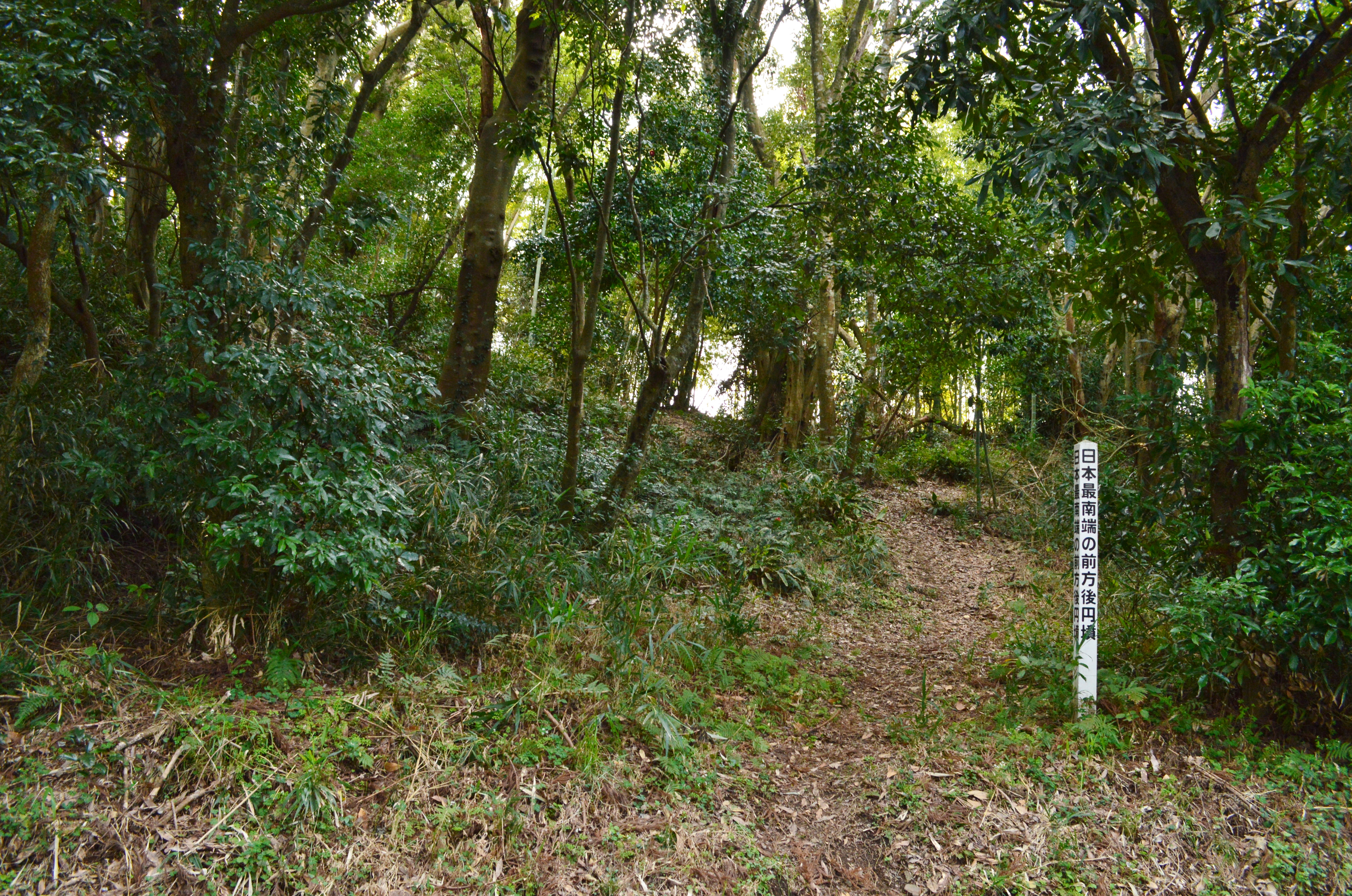
- Tsukazaki Kofun No.51

- Tsukazaki Kofun Cluster Tsukazaki Kofun Cluster (Kagoshima Prefecture)
- Interactive map of Tsukazaki Kofun Cluster
- 31°20′11.40″N 130°58′2.96″E
- Type: Kofun
- Periods: Kofun period
- Location: Kimotsuki, Kagoshima, Japan
- Region: Kyushu

History
- Built: c.4th-5th century

Site notes
- Public access: Yes

The Tsukazaki Kofun Cluster (塚崎古墳群) is a group of Kofun period burial mounds, located in the town of Kimotsuki, Kagoshima Prefecture Japan. The tumulus cluster was designated a National Historic Site of Japan in 1945, with the area under protection expanded in 2013, 2020 and 2024.

== Overview ==
The Tsukazaki Kofun Cluster consists of five zenpō-kōen-fun (前方後円墳), which are shaped like a keyhole, having one square end and one circular end, when viewed from above, and 39 enpun (円墳) round tumuli. The cluster is located on the Shirasu Plateau and Tsukasaki Plateau at an elevation of 20 to 30 meters on the right bank of the Kimomi River at the northern foot of the Kunimi Mountain Range. It is located about three kilometers east of Kimotsuki Town Hall. More than ten underground horizontal cave tombs have been confirmed, in which the burial chamber is dug horizontally from the bottom of a vertical pit. This design was popular in the Ōsumi area around the 5th century. Therefore, it is thought that the entire group of tombs was constructed between the 4th and 5th centuries. However, no archaeological excavations have been performed on many of the tumuli in the cluster, including all of the keyhole-shaped tumulus, and so much remains unknown.

Kofun No.39, also known as the "Hanamure Kofun", is the southernmost zenpō-kōen-fun in Japan. It has a total length of approximately 66 meters and a height of ten meters, and was constructed by shaping the tip of a small natural hill. Fukiishi has been found on top of the mound. Kofun No. 25 contains a small round-bottom pot and earthenware stand that is presumed to have been used for burial rituals. Kofun No. 18 contained similar pot-shaped clay pottery, and Kofun No. 31 had Haji ware and Sue ware thought to have been obtained from the Kinai region.

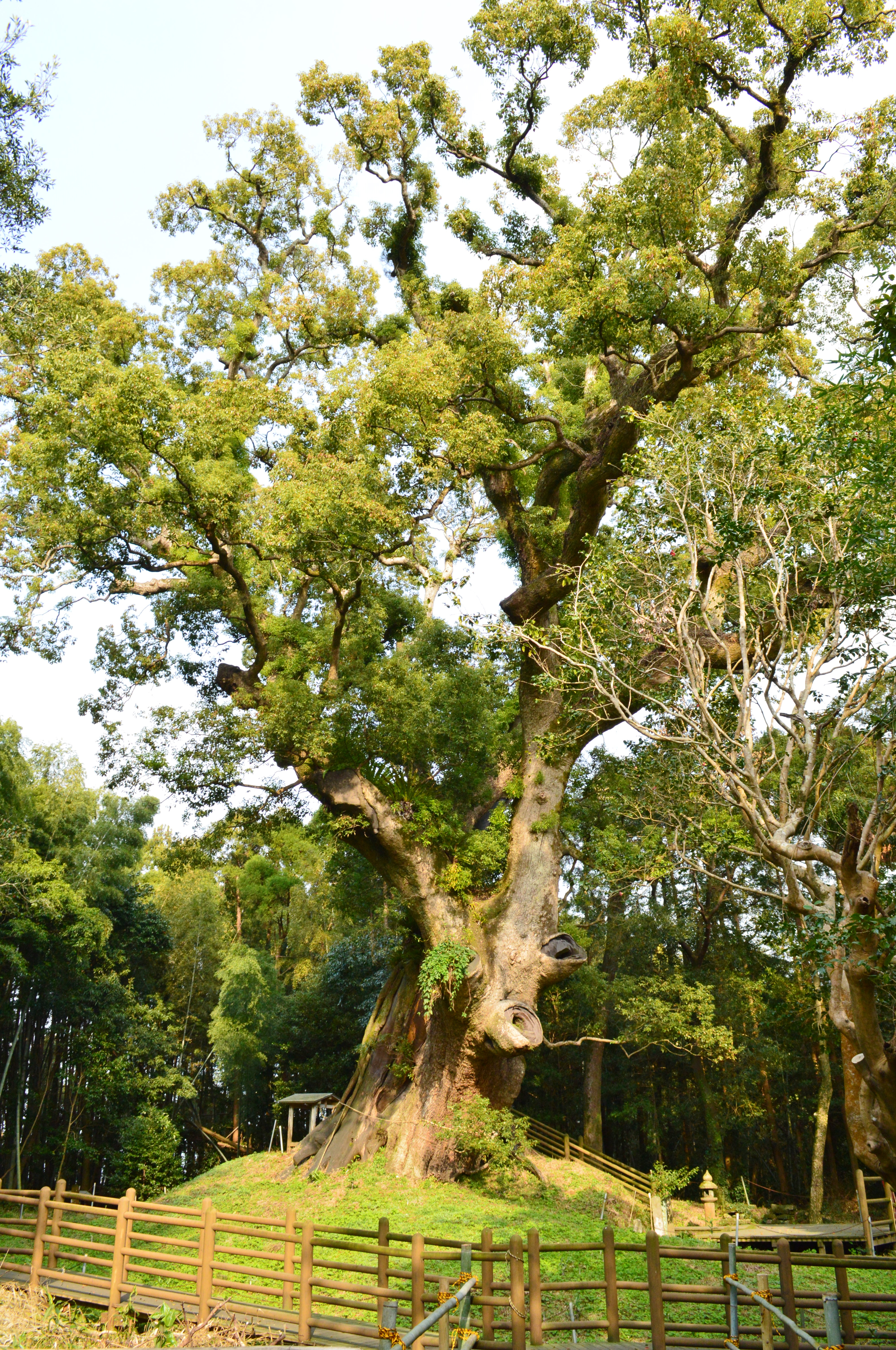
Kofun No.1 with Tsukazaki Kusu tree

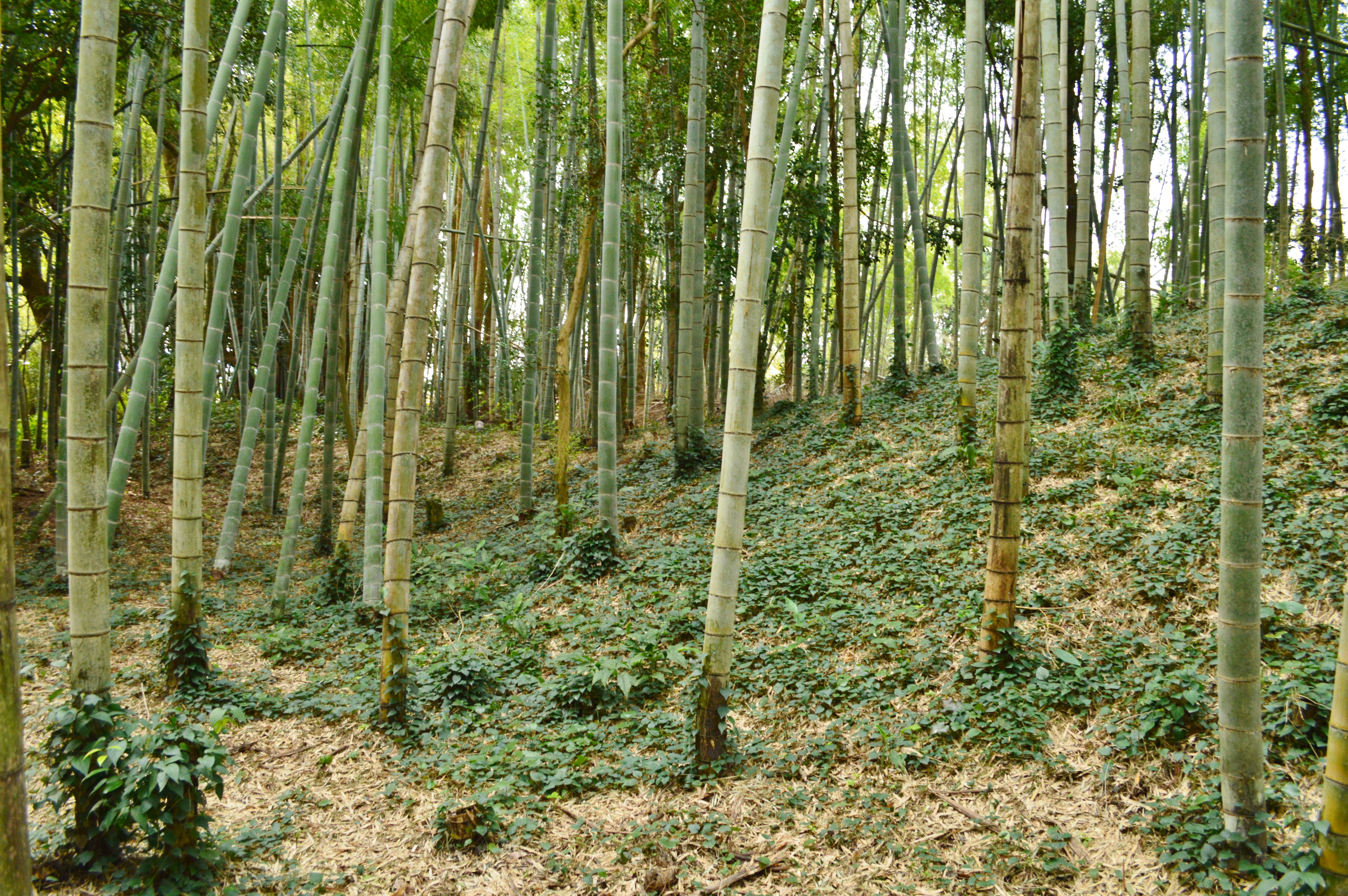
Kofun No.10

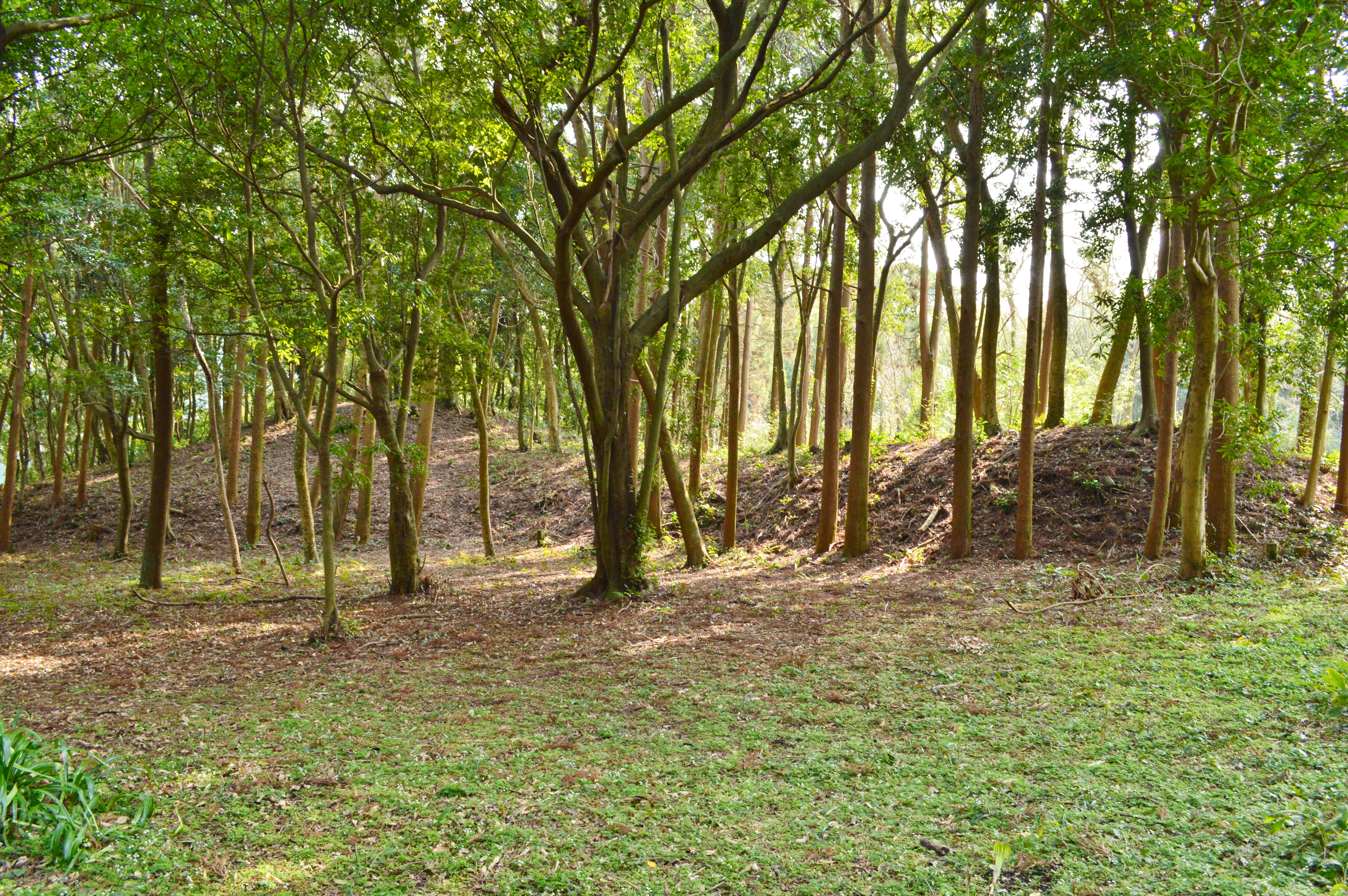
Kofun No.11

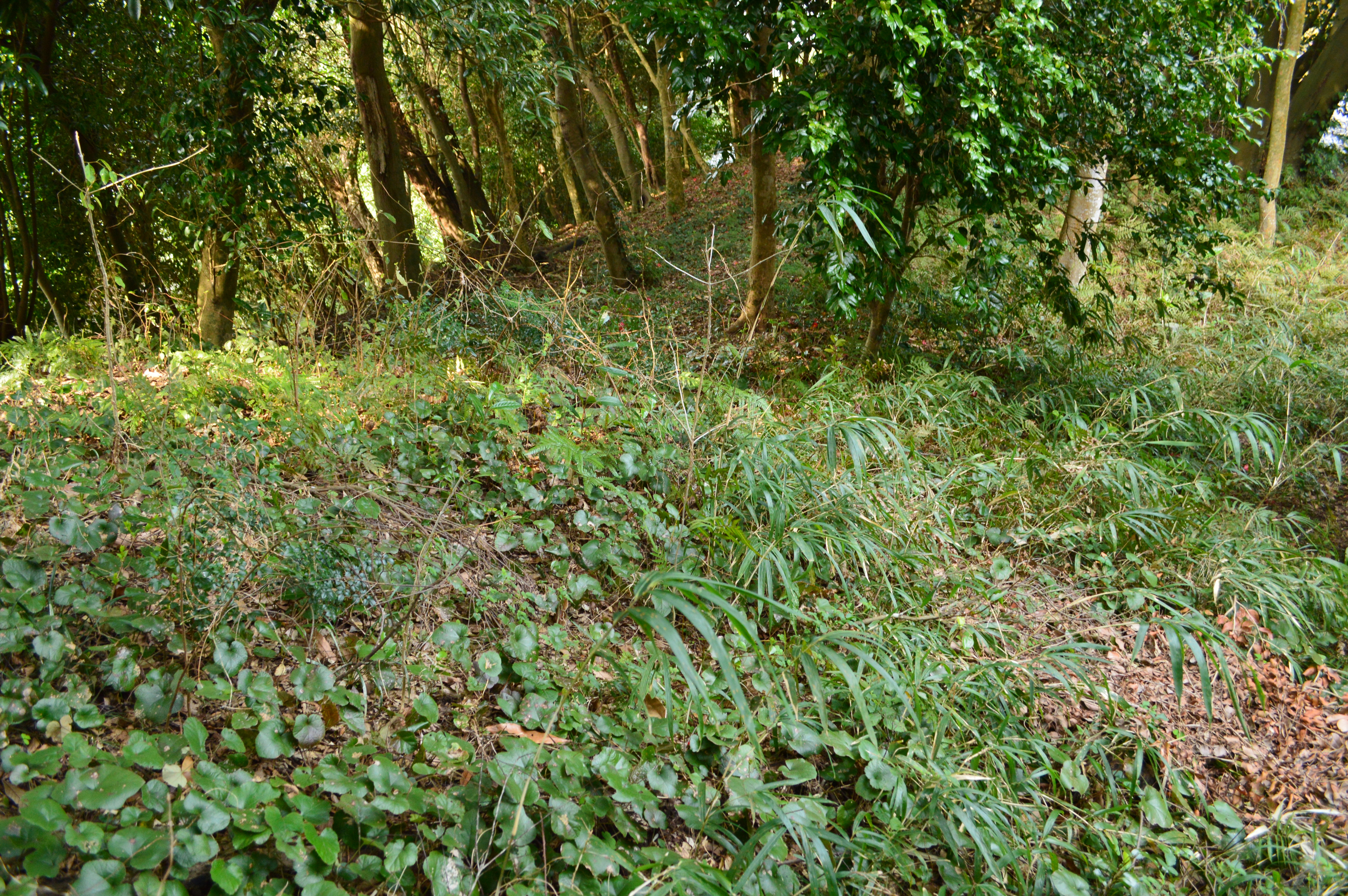
Kofun No.21

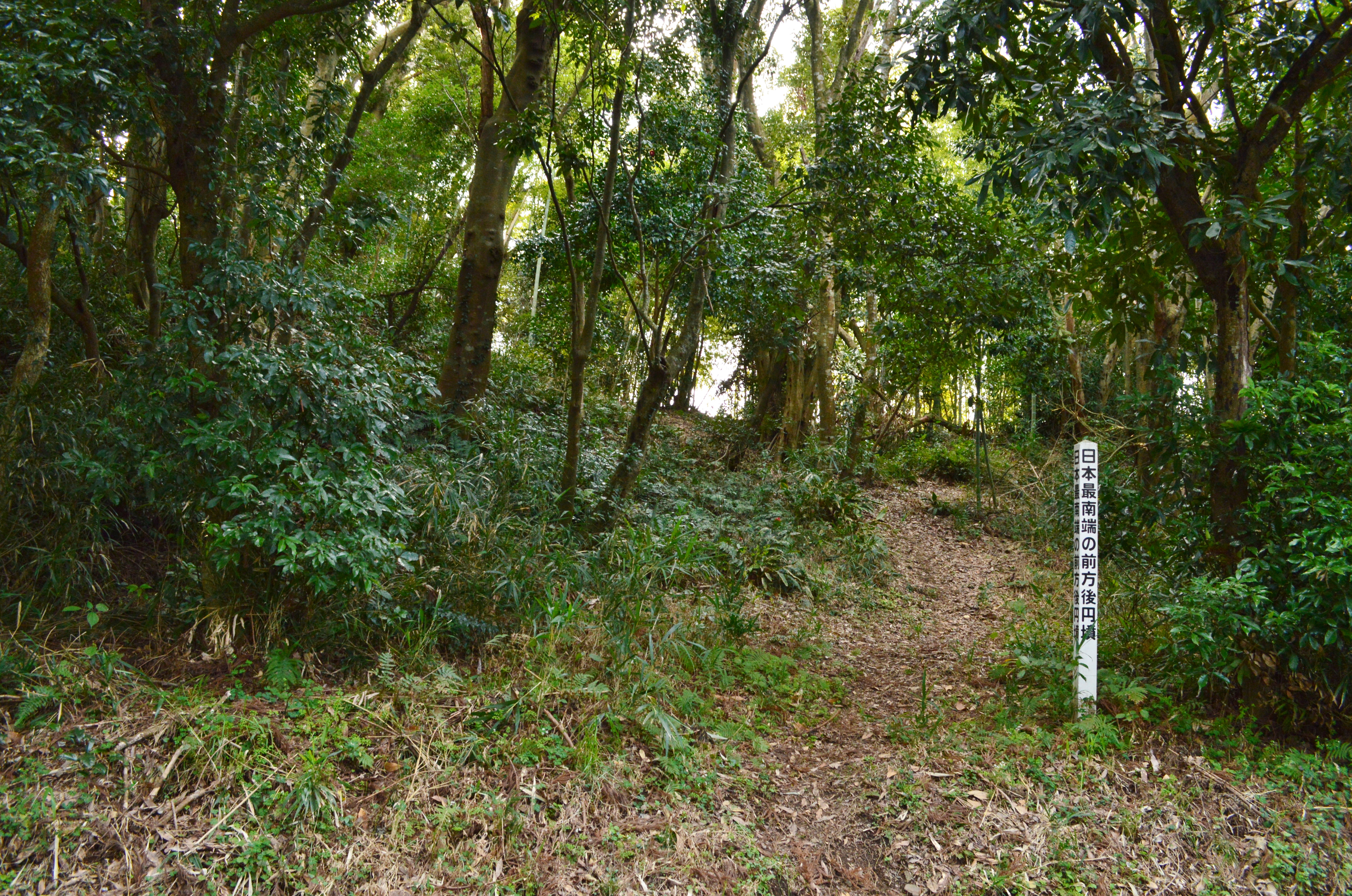
Kofun No.51

On the mound of Kofun No. 1 is the Tsukazaki Kusu tree (塚崎のクス), a Kusunoki estimated to be approximately 1,300 years old. This area is within the precincts of Otsuka Shrine, which was founded by Shimazu Tadahisa, the founder of the Shimazu clan, and it is said that it was considered a sacred tree from the time the shrine was founded. It measures 25 meters in height and 14 meters in circumference, and was once at least ten meters taller, but was damaged by Typhoon No. 13 in 1993. In addition, the tree's vigor has been declining in recent years, with rot seen in various parts of the tree and some parts of the trunk becoming hollow. The tree is a National Natural Monument.

The site is approximately 39 minutes by car from Shibushi Station on the JR Kyushu Nichinan Line.

== See also ==
- List of Historic Sites of Japan (Kagoshima)
