= Tashiro, Kagoshima =

Dissolved municipality in Kagoshima prefecture, Japan

Tashiro (田代町, Tashiro-chō) was a town located in Kimotsuki District, Kagoshima Prefecture, Japan.

As of 2003, the town had an estimated population of 3,278 and a density of 42.13 persons per km^{2}. The total area was 77.81 km^{2}.

On March 22, 2005, Tashiro, along with the town of Ōnejime (also from Kimotsuki District), was merged to create the town of Kinkō.
