= Sata, Kagoshima =

Dissolved municipality in Kagoshima prefecture, Japan

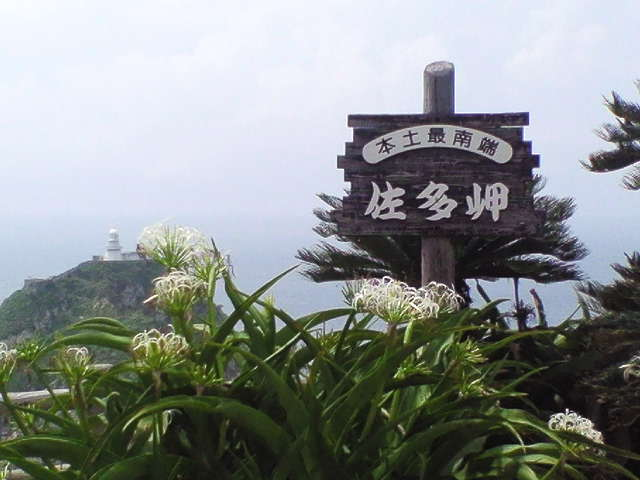
Cape Sata

Sata (佐多町, Sata-chō) was a town located in Kimotsuki District, Kagoshima Prefecture, Japan.

As of 2003, the town had an estimated population of 3,480 and a density of 27.72 persons per km^{2}. The total area was 125.53 km^{2}.

On March 31, 2005, Sata, along with the town of Nejime (also from Kimotsuki District), were merged to create the town of Minamiōsumi.
