= Nejime, Kagoshima =

Dissolved municipality in Kagoshima prefecture, Japan

Nejime (根占町, Nejime-chō) was a town located in Kimotsuki District, Kagoshima Prefecture, Japan.

As of 2003, the town had an estimated population of 6,758 and a density of 76.734 persons per km^{2}. The total area was 88.06 km^{2}.

On March 31, 2005, Nejime, along with the town of Sata (also from Kimotsuki District), was merged to create the town of Minamiōsumi.
