= Kimotsuki District, Kagoshima =

District in Kagoshima prefecture, Japan

Coordinates: 31.206°N 130.863°E

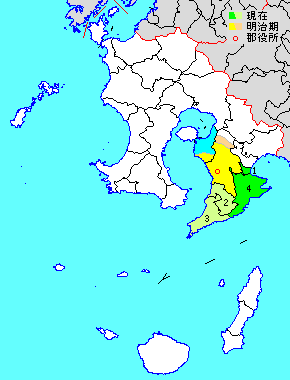
The location of Kimotsuki District in Kagoshima Prefecture.

Kimotsuki (肝属郡, Kimotsuki-gun) is a district located in Kagoshima Prefecture, Japan.

As of the January 1, 2006 merger but with 2003 population statistics, the district has an estimated population of 46,943 and a density of 65.9 persons per km^{2}. The total area is 712.55 km^{2}.

== Towns and villages ==
- Higashikushira
- Kimotsuki
- Kinkō
- Minamiōsumi

== Mergers ==
- On March 22, 2005 the towns of Ōnejime and Tashiro merged into the town of Kinkō.
- On March 31, 2005 the towns of Nejime and Sata merged into the town of Minamiōsumi.
- On July 1, 2005 the towns of Kōyama and Uchinoura merged into the town of Kimotsuki.
- On January 1, 2006 the towns of Aira and Kushira, and the town of Kihoku, from Soo District, merged into the expanded city of Kanoya.
