= Sata physic gardens =

Physic garden in Japan

- 佐多旧薬園 (Japanese)
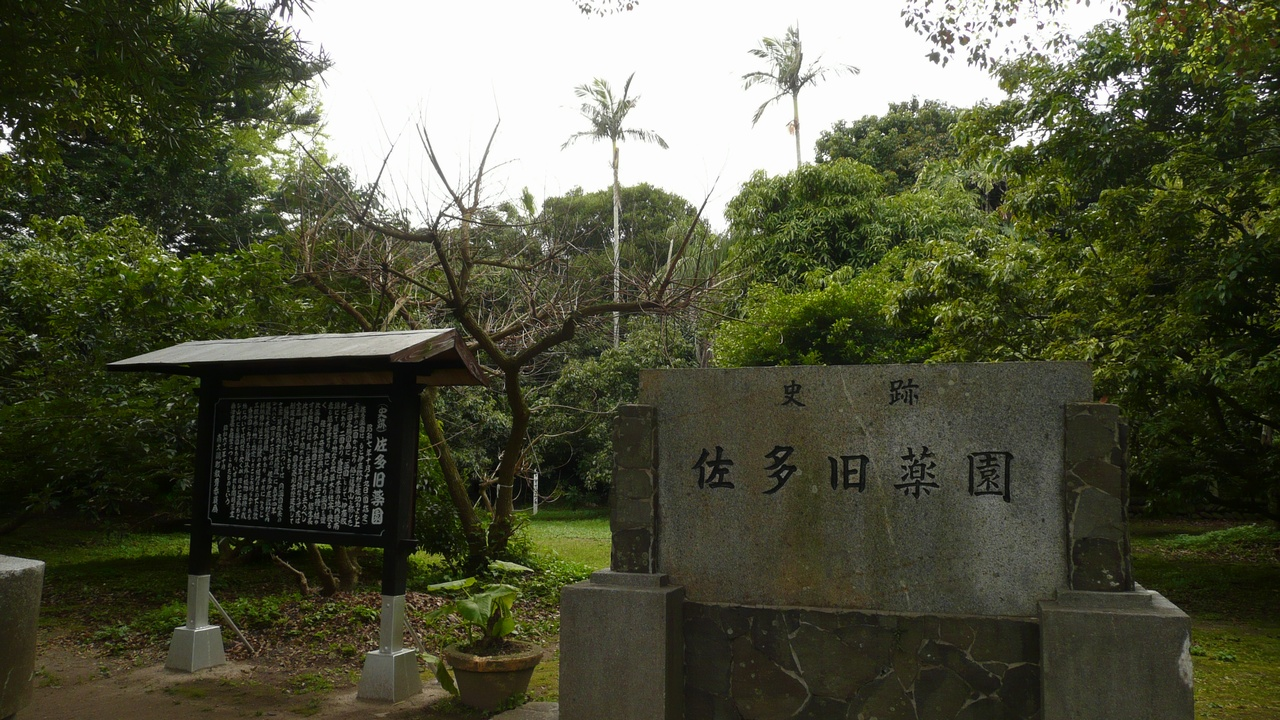

- Former Sata Medicinal Garden Sata physic gardens (Japan)
- Interactive map of Sata physic gardens
- 31°5′31.0″N 130°41′26.8″E
- Type: botanic garden
- Periods: Edo period
- Location: Minamiōsumi, Kagoshima, Japan
- Region: Kyushu

Site notes
- Public access: Yes (occasionally)

The Sata physic garden (佐多旧薬園, Sata kyu-Yakuen) was an Edo period physic garden, located in the Sata Izashiki neighborhood of the town of Minamiōsumi, Kagoshima Prefecture Japan. The site was designated a National Historic Site of Japan in 1932.

== Overview ==
The Sata physic garden is located at the southernmost tip of mainland Kyushu. It is unknown when the physic garden was established, but in 1687 Niiro Tokimasu, a karō of the Shimazu clan, planted a longan, an evergreen tree native to China, in the village of Sata Izashiki, and later presented the fruit to the daimyō of Satsuma Domain. It became a medicinal garden during the Hōreki era (1751–1764), under the direction of Shimazu Shigehide, the 25th generation chieftain of the Shimazu clan. Focusing on plants imported from the south via the Ryukyu Islands, the garden was planted with many tropical plants such as longans, litchis, Planchonella obovata, and Ficus macrophylla. Medicinal herbs were mainly imported from the South Pacific and eastern China, and were used in medicine until the end of the Edo period. In addition to medicinal research, the garden was a source of revenue for the domain. Satsuma Domain maintained two other physic gardens, the Yamagawa Yakuen Garden and Yoshino Yakuen Garden, both near Kagoshima Castle, and these three medicinal gardens were called the "Sanyakuen". All were abolished with the abolition of feudal domains following the Meiji Restoration and both the Yamagawa and Yoshino gardens were destroyed due to urban encroachment. The Sata garden survived due to its more remote location and a 30-acre plot of land where plants from the time of the domain's rule are still planted.

The park is currently open to the public. It is located approximately 70 minutes by car from Tarumi Port.

== See also ==
- List of Historic Sites of Japan (Kagoshima)
