= Ogawa Falls =

Coordinates: 31°12′1.1″N 130°49′31.0″E

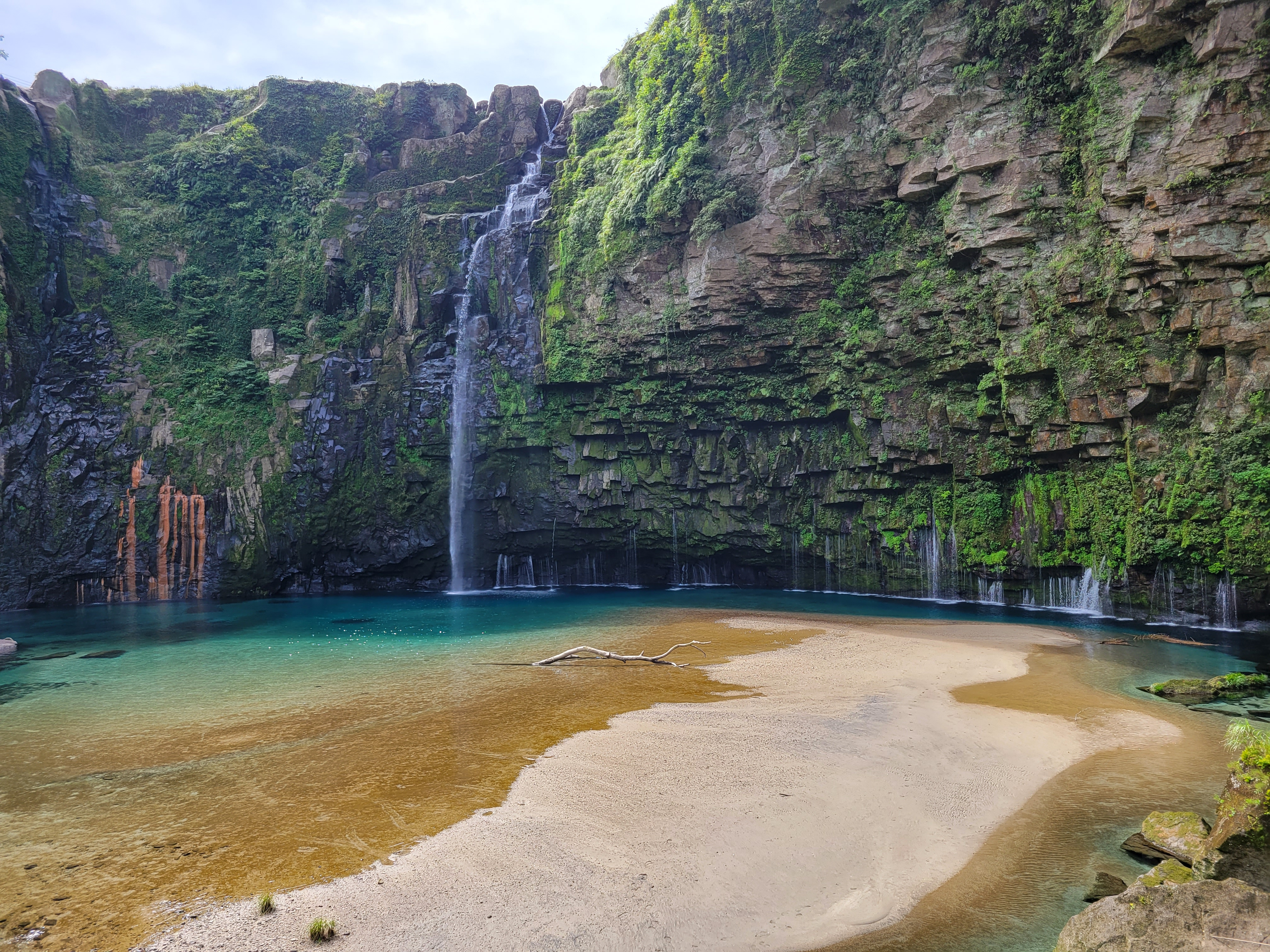
Ogawa Falls, Minamiōsumi, Kagoshima, Japan.

Ogawa Falls (Japanese: 雄川の滝) is located in Minamiōsumi, Kagoshima, Japan, the town in the southern tip of the Osumi Peninsula. It is a 46-meter (151-foot) waterfall, 60 meters (197 feet) in extended width, in the midstream of the Ogawa River.

Ogawa Falls had been relatively unknown until 2013 when Kagoshima Bank included its picture in the calendar for the annual free distribution to their customers. It is particularly known for the waterfall basin becoming beautiful emerald green when water is falling in regular, but not big amount.

== Transportation ==
No public transportation is available. There are two parking areas, one in the upperstream of the waterfall and the other in the downstream, both not far from the Nejime Port of the Yamagawa-Nejime Ferry over Kagoshima Bay between the Satsuma and Osumi Peninsulas. From the downstream parking area, there is a 1.2 km (0.75 mile) hiking trail to the observation deck in front of the waterfall basin.

Gallery

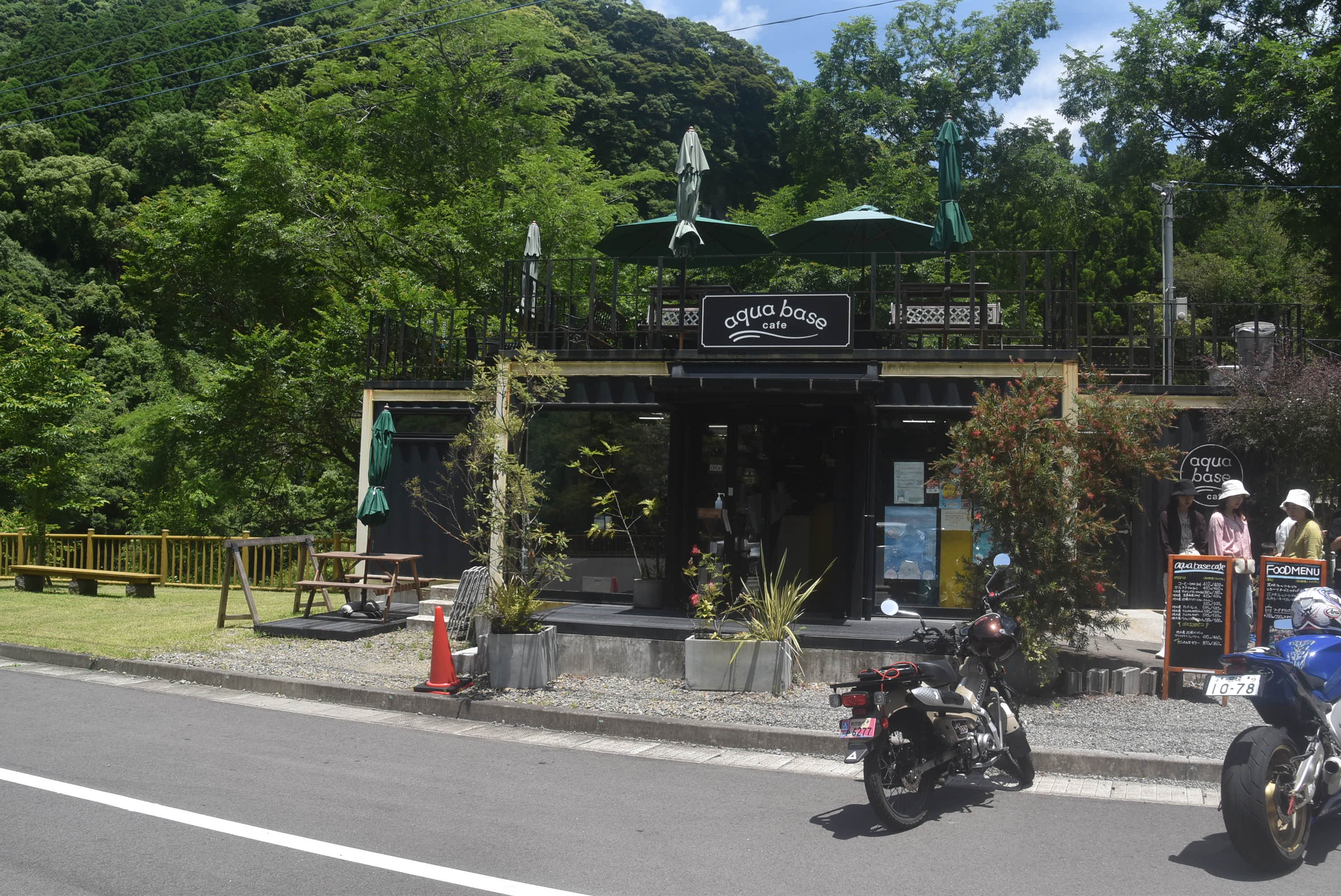
A cafe and a restroom at the downstream parking lot, the starting point of the hiking trail

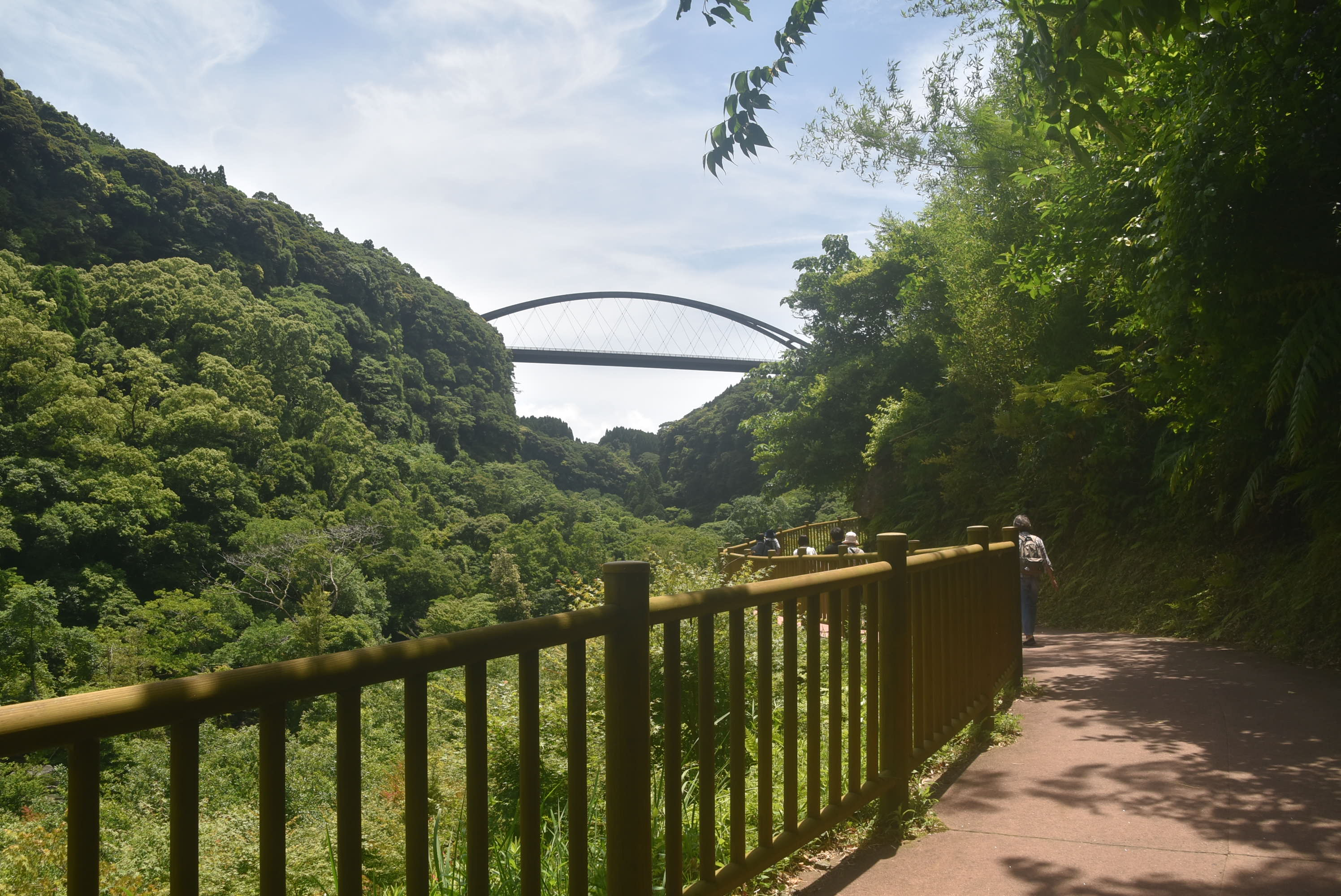
The Takimi Bridge above the hiking trail

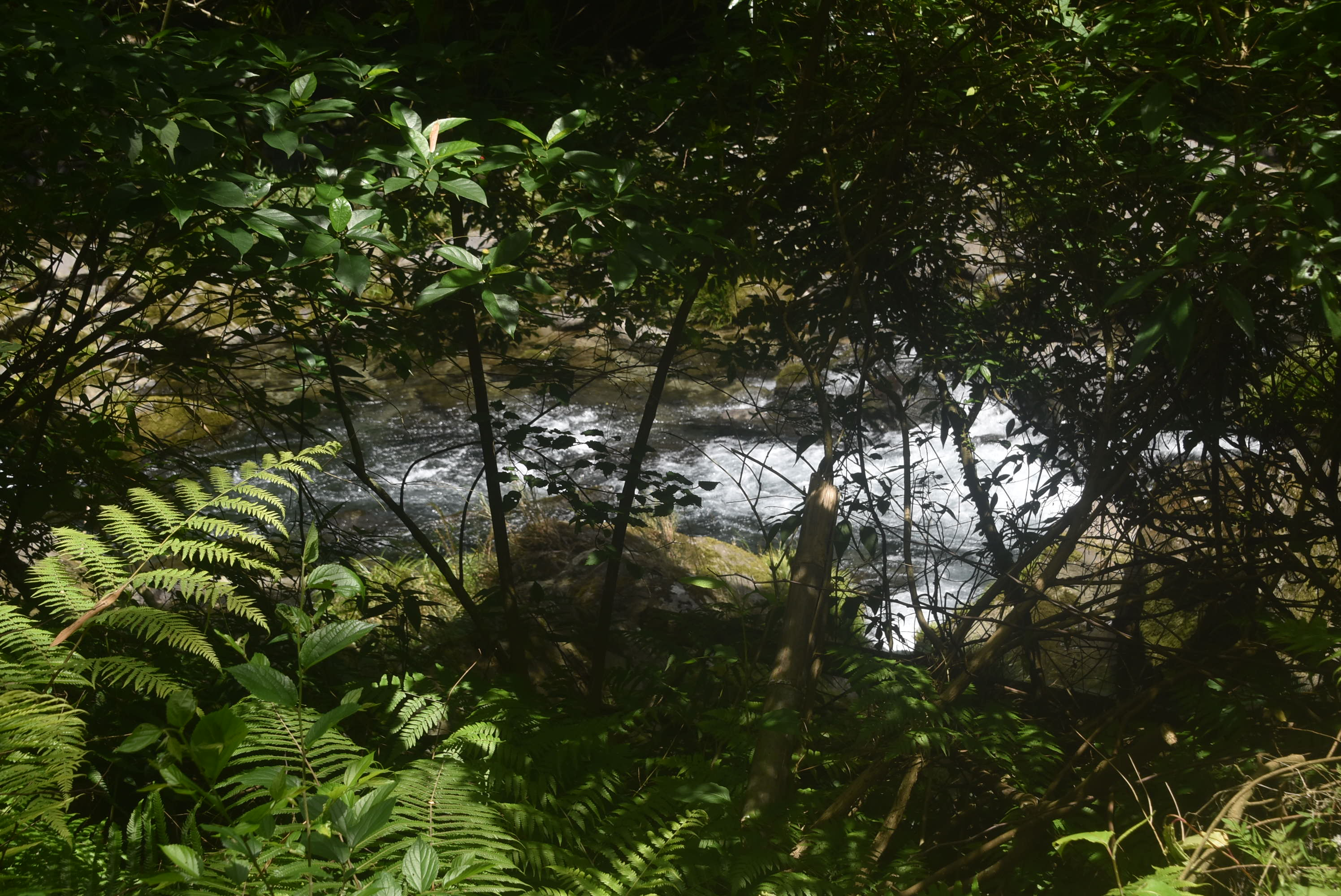
The Ogawa River through the trees

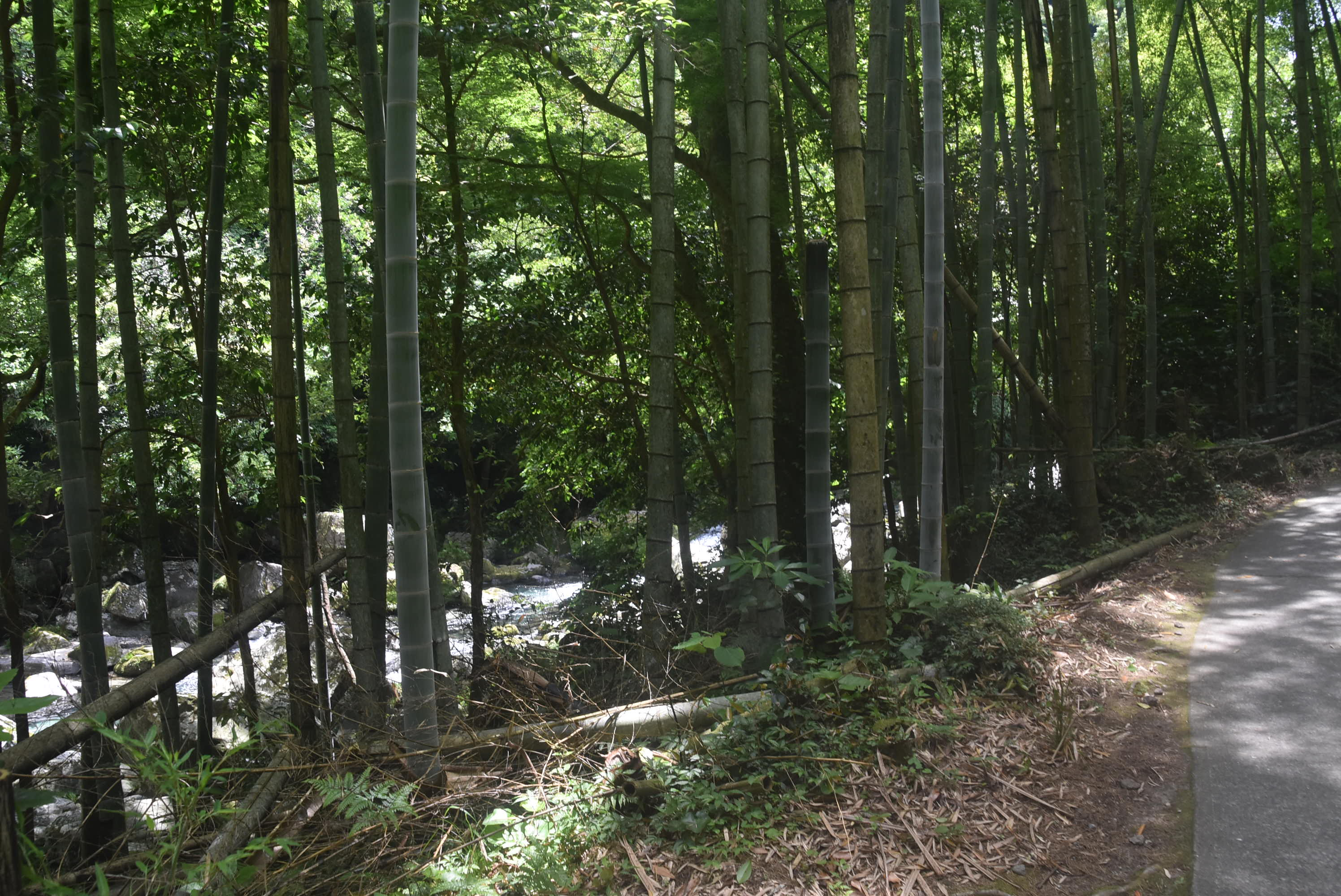
Bamboo trees along the trail

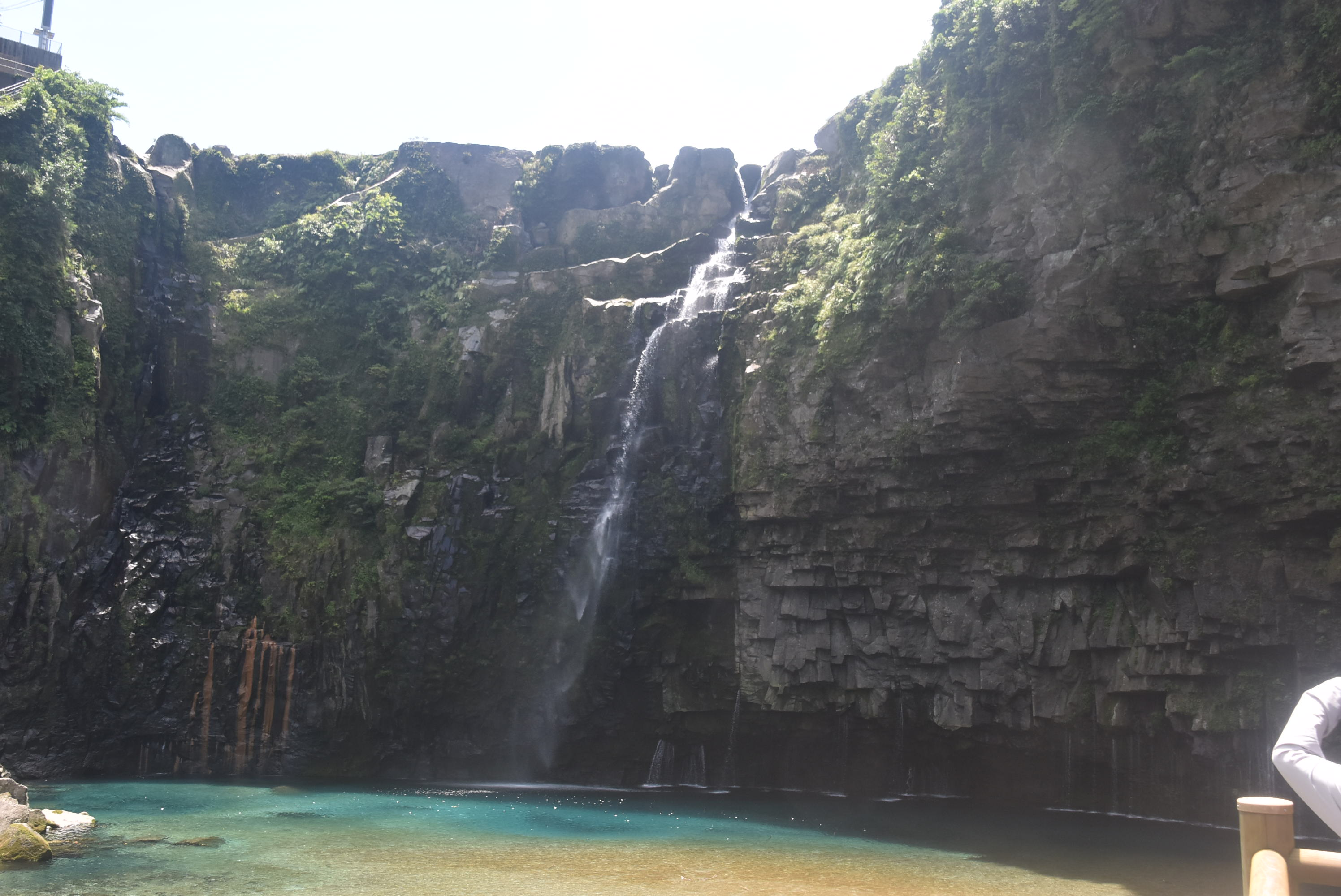
Ogawa Falls from the two-storey observation deck

== See also ==
- Famous places of Minamiōsumi, Kagoshima
- Ōsumi Peninsula
