= Kōyama, Kagoshima =

Dissolved municipality in Kagoshima prefecture, Japan

Kōyama (高山町, Kōyama-chō) was a town located in Kimotsuki District, Kagoshima Prefecture, Japan.

As of 2003, the town had an estimated population of 14,441 and a density of 112.15 persons per km^{2}. The total area was 128.76 km^{2}.

On July 1, 2005, Kōyama, along with the town of Uchinoura (also from Kimotsuki District), was merged to create the town of Kimotsuki.
