= Kimotsuki Kanetsugu =

Kimotsuki Kanetsugu (肝付 兼続; 1511 – December 26, 1566) was the sixteenth head of the Kimotsuki family and the son of Kimotsuki Kaneoki. Kanetsugu was a skilled and smart leader, but his domain happened to be next to that of the most powerful clan in Kyūshū, the Shimazu clan, and the Kimotsuki family would be defeated by them.

After his father, Kaneoki, died, Kanetsugu killed his uncle Kimotsuki Kaneshu to become the head of the clan. Kanetsugu believed that maintaining a good relationship with the neighboring Shimazu clan was essential to the clan's survival and had the eldest daughter of Shimazu Tadayoshi as his wife as well as having his sister marry Shimazu Takahisa. On the other hand, he moved to unify Ōsumi Province and captured Takaoka Castle in 1538 to capture the majority of the province. In 1533, he had his son Kimotsuki Yoshikane take over the clan and retired but still held onto most of the actual power.

In 1561, the relationship between his clan and the Shimazu collapsed and Kanetsugu allied his clan with the Itō clan of Hyūga Province to counter Shimazu. In the same year, he repelled invading Shimazu troops with much success and killed the younger brother of Takahisa, Shimazu Tadamasa. Knowing that there was no turning back, Kanetsugu tried to divorce his wife who was of from the Shimazu clan, but she did not agree and declined the offer.

In 1562, Kanetsugu and his troops captured Shibushi district to hold the largest domain. In 1566, the Shimazu clan massed its army and invaded again, capturing Kōyama Castle as well as most of Kimotsuki's domains. The desperate Kanetsugu retired to a small castle near the Shibushi area and committed suicide.
