= Uchinoura, Kagoshima =

Dissolved municipality in Kagoshima prefecture, Japan

Uchinoura (内之浦町, Uchinoura-chō) was a town located in Kimotsuki District, Kagoshima Prefecture, Japan.

As of 2003, the town had an estimated population of 4,577 and a density of 25.52 persons per km^{2}. The total area was 179.36 km^{2}.

On July 1, 2005, Uchinoura, along with the town of Kōyama (also from Kimotsuki District), was merged to create the town of Kimotsuki.

The Uchinoura Space Center is named after the town and was built before the merger.
