= Ōnejime, Kagoshima =

Dissolved municipality in Kagoshima prefecture, Japan

Ōnejime (大根占町, Ōnejime-chō) was a town located in Kimotsuki District, Kagoshima Prefecture, Japan.

As of 2003, the town had an estimated population of 7,189 and a density of 84.24 persons per km^{2}. The total area was 85.34 km^{2}.

On March 22, 2005, Ōnejime, along with the town of Tashiro (also from Kimotsuki District), was merged to create the town of Kinkō.
