= Kinkō, Kagoshima =

Town located in Kagoshima Prefecture, Japan

Kinkō 錦江町
- Town
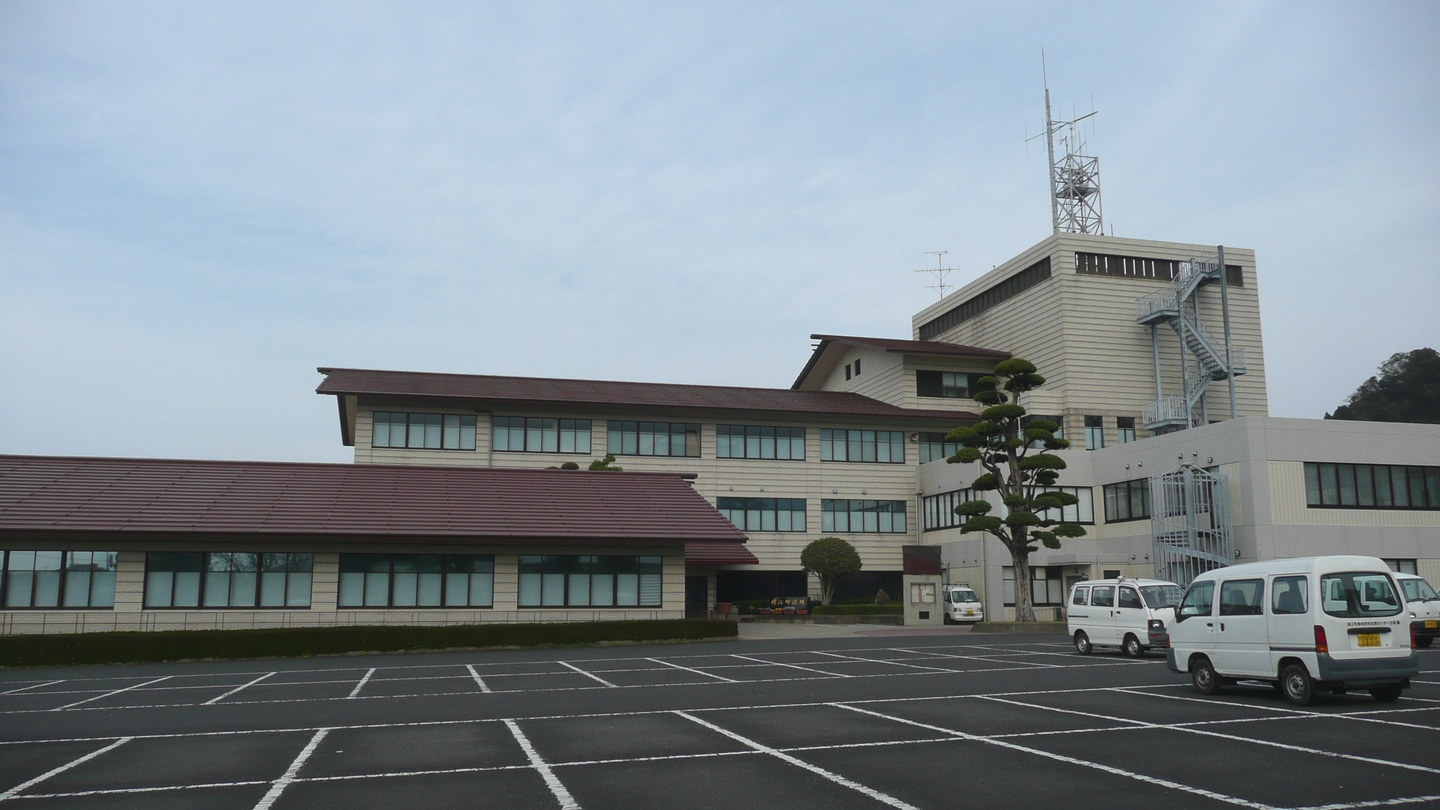
- Kinkō Town Hall

- Flag Emblem
- Interactive map of Kinkō
- Location in Japan
- Coordinates: 31°14′36″N 130°47′16″E
- Country: Japan
- Region: Kyushu
- Prefecture: Kagoshima
- District: Kimotsuki

Area
  - Total: 163.19 km^{2} (63.01 sq mi)

Population (May 1, 2024)
  - Total: 6,276
  - Density: 38.46/km^{2} (99.61/sq mi)
- Time zone: UTC+09:00 (JST)
- City hall address: 963 Shiromoto, Kinkō-chō, Kimozuki-gun, Kagoshima-ken 893-2302
- Climate: Cfa
- Website: Official website
- Symbols
- Flower: Wisteria floribunda
- Tree: Camphora officinarum

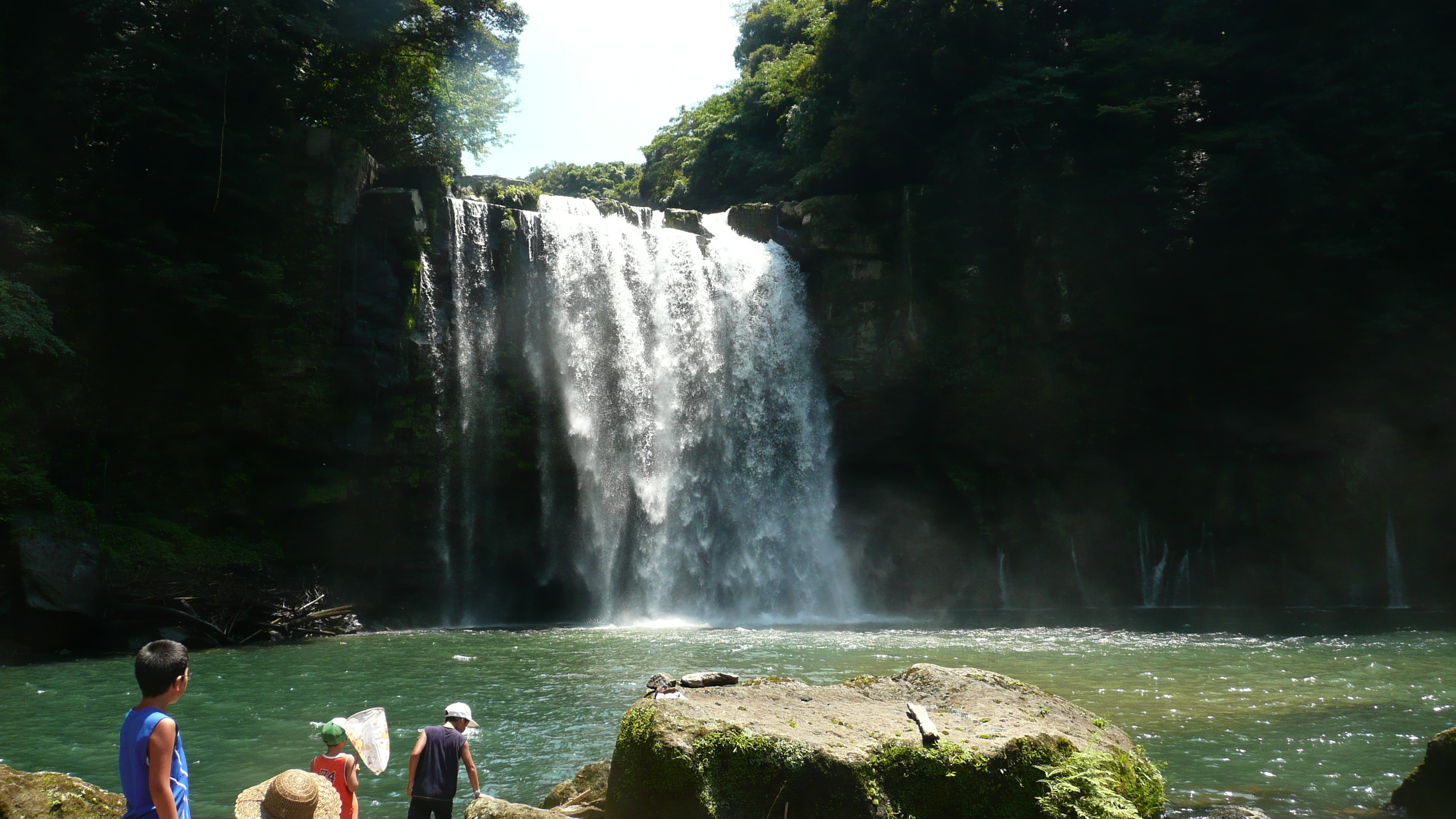
Kamikawa Falls

Kinkō (錦江町, Kinkō-chō) is a town located in Kimotsuki District, Kagoshima Prefecture, Japan. As of 31 March 2024, the town had an estimated population of 6,276 in 3490 households, and a population density of 38 persons per km^{2}. The total area of the town is 163.19 km^{2} (63.01 sq mi).

== Geography ==
Kinkō is located on the west coast of the Ōsumi Peninsula, facing Kinkō Bay (Kagoshima Bay) and the Satsuma Peninsula to the west. Most of the town area is occupied by the Kinomi Mountain Range (Kunimi Mountain Range). The coastal area on the west side (formerly the center of Ōnejime town) is separated from other areas by the cliff formed by the Ata caldera, and the Ōnejime plateau extends to the east. On the border with Minamiōsumi Town, there is an evergreen forest belt, and Mount Inao-dake is designated as a national Natural Monument.

=== Neighboring municipalities ===
Kagoshima Prefecture

- Kanoya to the north
- Kimotsuki to the east
- Minamiōsumi to the south

=== Climate ===
Kinkō has a humid subtropical climate (Köppen climate classification Cfa) with hot summers and mild winters. Precipitation is significant throughout the year, and is heavier in summer, especially the months of June and July. The average annual temperature in Kinkō is 16.4 °C (61.5 °F). The average annual rainfall is 2,880.2 mm (113.39 in) with June as the wettest month. The temperatures are highest on average in August, at around 26.1 °C (79.0 °F), and lowest in January, at around 6.6 °C (43.9 °F). Its record high is 35.7 °C (96.3 °F), reached on 18 August 2020, and its record low is −10.4 °C (13.3 °F), reached on 25 January 2016.

Climate data for Kinkō (1991−2020 normals, extremes 1977−present)
Month	Jan	Feb	Mar	Apr	May	Jun	Jul	Aug	Sep	Oct	Nov	Dec	Year
Record high °C (°F)	22.2 (72.0)	23.9 (75.0)	25.8 (78.4)	27.6 (81.7)	31.5 (88.7)	34.4 (93.9)	35.5 (95.9)	36.7 (98.1)	34.1 (93.4)	31.5 (88.7)	28.0 (82.4)	24.1 (75.4)	36.7 (98.1)
Mean daily maximum °C (°F)	11.6 (52.9)	13.0 (55.4)	16.0 (60.8)	20.3 (68.5)	24.1 (75.4)	26.3 (79.3)	30.1 (86.2)	30.8 (87.4)	28.6 (83.5)	24.2 (75.6)	19.0 (66.2)	13.8 (56.8)	21.5 (70.7)
Daily mean °C (°F)	6.6 (43.9)	7.8 (46.0)	10.7 (51.3)	14.9 (58.8)	18.8 (65.8)	22.2 (72.0)	25.8 (78.4)	26.1 (79.0)	23.5 (74.3)	18.6 (65.5)	13.3 (55.9)	8.3 (46.9)	16.4 (61.5)
Mean daily minimum °C (°F)	1.4 (34.5)	2.2 (36.0)	5.2 (41.4)	9.2 (48.6)	13.7 (56.7)	18.6 (65.5)	22.2 (72.0)	22.4 (72.3)	19.5 (67.1)	13.7 (56.7)	7.9 (46.2)	2.9 (37.2)	11.6 (52.9)
Record low °C (°F)	−10.4 (13.3)	−6.8 (19.8)	−4.5 (23.9)	−1.4 (29.5)	4.0 (39.2)	8.2 (46.8)	12.9 (55.2)	14.7 (58.5)	8.5 (47.3)	0.3 (32.5)	−3.1 (26.4)	−6.1 (21.0)	−10.4 (13.3)
Average precipitation mm (inches)	90.1 (3.55)	130.8 (5.15)	170.5 (6.71)	205.1 (8.07)	235.0 (9.25)	613.6 (24.16)	413.9 (16.30)	317.2 (12.49)	334.9 (13.19)	157.0 (6.18)	121.9 (4.80)	98.2 (3.87)	2,880.2 (113.39)
Average precipitation days (≥ 1.0 mm)	9.6	10.2	13.1	11.0	11.1	17.3	12.7	14.5	12.7	8.7	9.2	9.3	139.4
Mean monthly sunshine hours	116.6	125.0	154.6	168.9	166.3	95.6	179.1	187.9	152.2	168.2	145.6	126.5	1,785.2
Source: Japan Meteorological Agency

== Demographics ==
Per Japanese census data, the population of Kinkō in 2020 is 6,944 people. Kinkō began the census in 1920, and the town's population peaked in the 1950s at more than 22,000 people; the population has continued to decline since then. After the 2010s, Kinkō's population has fallen below 10,000.

Historical population

Year	Pop.	±%
1920	15,245	—
1925	15,126	−0.8%
1930	16,080	+6.3%
1935	16,942	+5.4%
1940	17,351	+2.4%
1945	20,760	+19.6%
1950	21,980	+5.9%
1955	22,552	+2.6%
1960	21,967	−2.6%
1965	19,726	−10.2%
1970	16,736	−15.2%

Year	Pop.	±%
1975	14,959	−10.6%
1980	13,829	−7.6%
1985	13,043	−5.7%
1990	12,239	−6.2%
1995	11,608	−5.2%
2000	10,889	−6.2%
2005	10,015	−8.0%
2010	8,979	−10.3%
2015	7,923	−11.8%
2020	6,944	−12.4%

Kinkō population statistics

== History ==
The area of Kinkō was part of ancient Ōsumi Province. Remains from the Jomon and Yayoi Period have been found within town borders. During the Heian period it was the site of a large shōen landed estate ruled by the Neshin clan into the Sengoku period. During the Edo Period, the area was part of the holdings of Satsuma Domain. The villages of Ōnejime and Tashiro were established on May 1, 1889, with the creation of the modern municipalities system. Ōnejime was raised to town status in August 1933, followed by Tashiro in April 1961. The two municipalities merged on March 22, 2005, to form the town of Kinkō.

== Government ==
Kinkō has a mayor-council form of government with a directly elected mayor and a unicameral town council of 13 members. Kinkō, collectively with the other municipalities of Kimotsuki District, contributes one member to the Kagoshima Prefectural Assembly. In terms of national politics, the town is part of the Kagoshima 4th district of the lower house of the Diet of Japan.

== Economy ==
The economy of Kinkō is based largely on agriculture and commercial fishing.

== Education ==
Kinkō has six public elementary high schools and two public junior high schools operated by the town government. The town does not have a high school.

== Transportation ==
=== Railways ===
Kinkō does not have any passenger railway service. The nearest major station is Kagoshima-Chūō Station on the Kyushu Shinkansen.

=== Highways ===
- National Route 269
- National Route 448
