= Minamiōsumi, Kagoshima =

Minamiōsumi 南大隅町
- Town
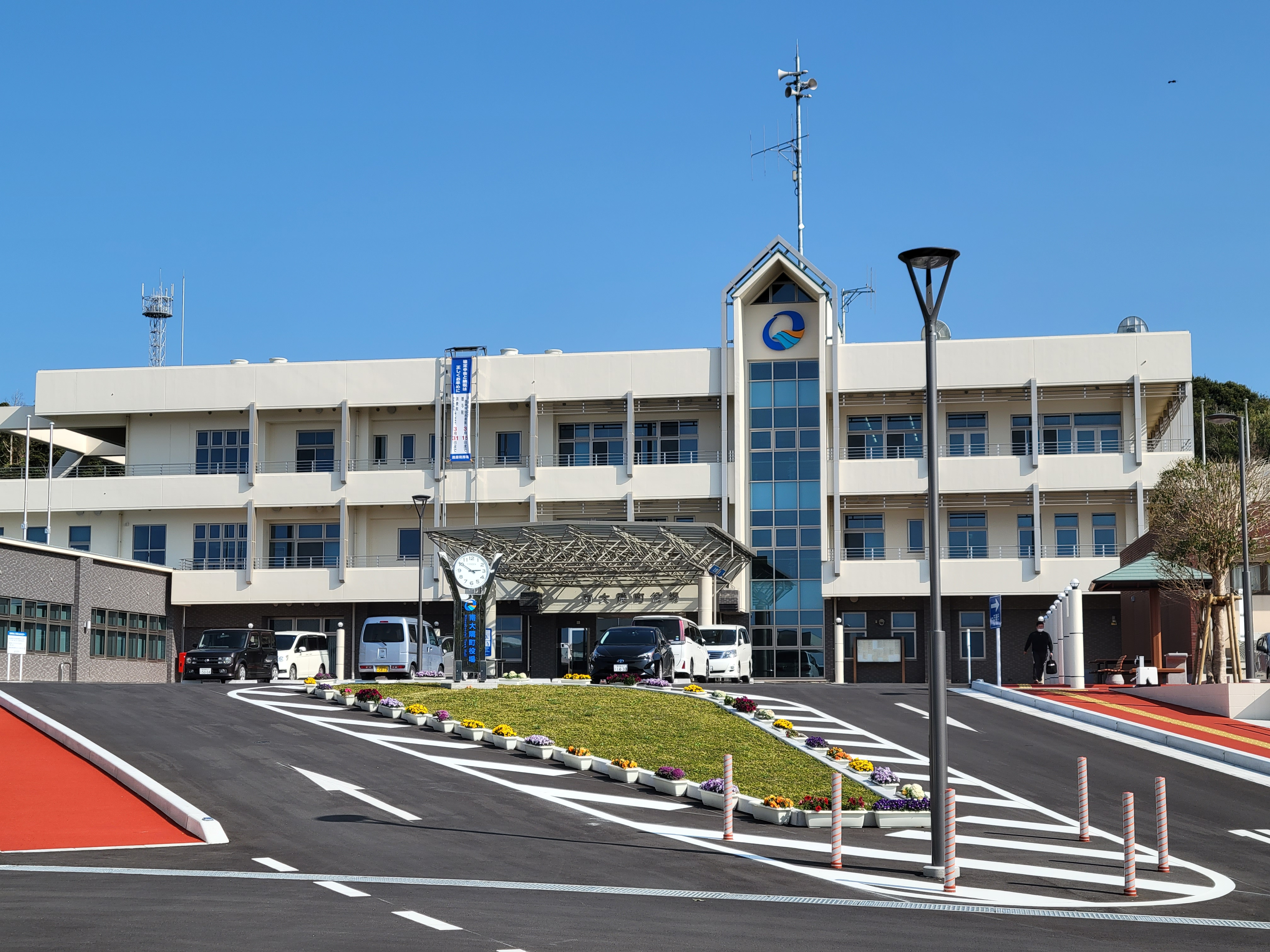
- Minamiōsumi Town Hall

- Flag Chapter
- Interactive map of Minamiōsumi
- Location in Japan
- Coordinates: 31°13′2″N 130°46′6″E}
- Country: Japan
- Region: Kyushu
- Prefecture: Kagoshima
- District: Kimotsuki

Area
  - Total: 213.59 km^{2} (82.47 sq mi)

Population (April 1, 2024)
  - Total: 6,059
  - Density: 28.37/km^{2} (73.47/sq mi)
- Time zone: UTC+09:00 (JST)
- City hall address: 226 Neshikawakita, Minamiōsumi-machi, Kimosuke-gun, Kagoshima-ken 893–2501
- Website: Official website

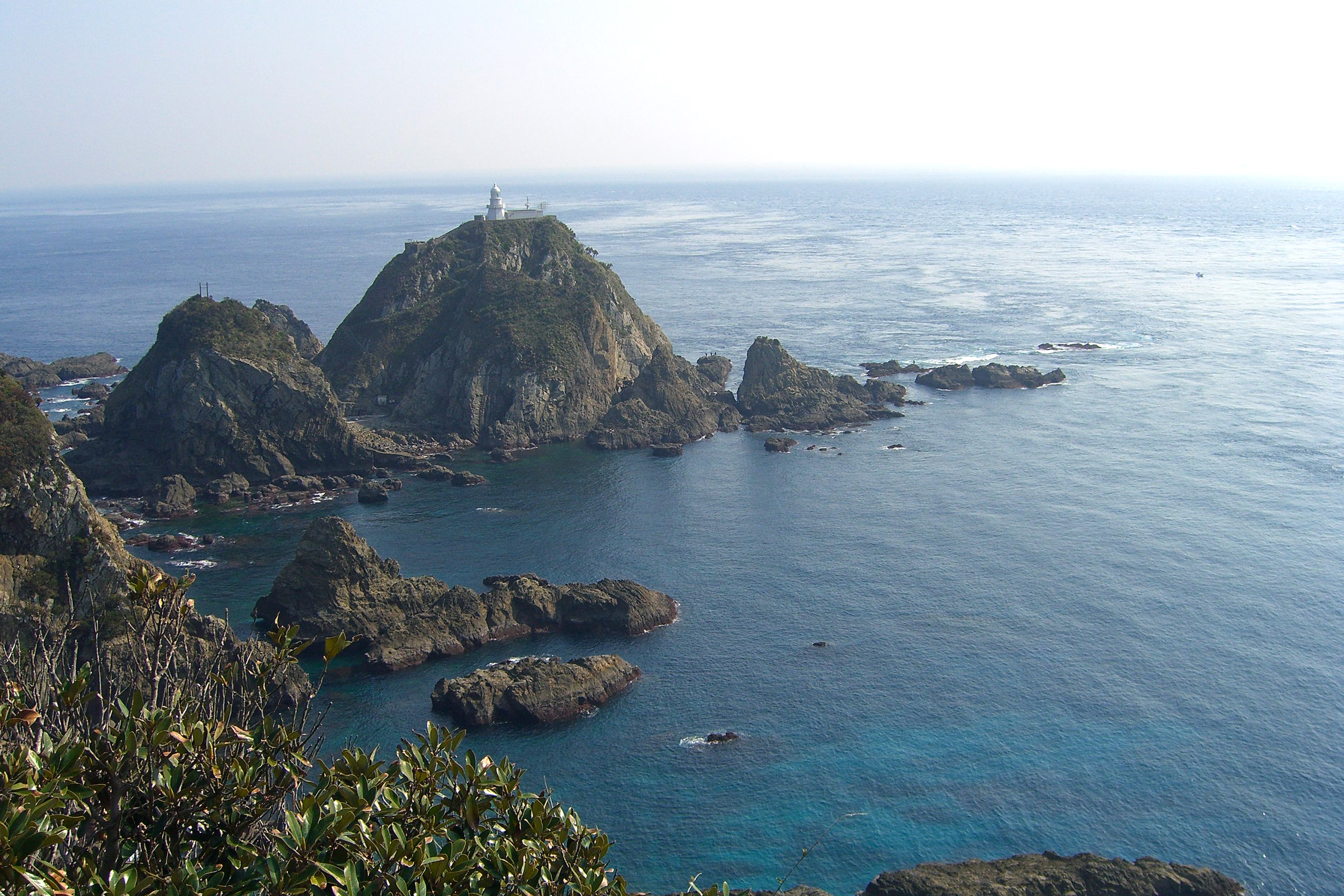
Cape Sata

Minamiōsumi (南大隅町, Minamiōsumi-chō) is a town located in Kimotsuki District, Kagoshima Prefecture, Japan. Its name literally means "the southern part of Ōsumi." As of 1 April 2024, the town had an estimated population of 6,059 in 3518 households, and a population density of 28 persons per km^{2}. The total area of the town is 213.59 km^{2} (82.47 sq mi).

== Geography ==
Minamiōsumi is located in the southernmost part of the Ōsumi Peninsula, surrounded by Kagoshima Bay (Kinko Bay) and the East China Sea to the west, the Pacific Ocean (Philippine Sea) to the east, and the Ōsumi Strait to the south. The 31st parallel north latitude passes over Cape Sata. Most of the town area is occupied by the Kimogen Mountains, and the habitable land area ratio is only 19%. The area from along Kinko Bay to Cape Sata on the west side is within the borders of Kirishima-Kinkowan National Park. Minamiōsumi is the southernmost town on the Japanese "mainland" (Japan's four main islands).

=== Neighboring towns ===
Kagoshima Prefecture

- Kimotsuki
- Kinkō

=== Climate ===
Minamiōsumi has a humid subtropical climate (Köppen Cfa) characterized by warm summers and cool winters with light to no snowfall. The average annual temperature in Minamiōsumi is 18.2 °C. The average annual rainfall is 2373 mm with September as the wettest month. The temperatures are highest on average in August, at around 26.6 °C, and lowest in January, at around 9.5 °C.

=== Demographics ===
Per Japanese census data, the population of Minamiōsumi is as shown below:

Historical population
Year	Pop.	±%
1920	17,723	—
1930	19,284	+8.8%
1940	19,925	+3.3%
1950	24,924	+25.1%
1960	23,847	−4.3%
1970	17,990	−24.6%
1980	14,344	−20.3%
1990	12,526	−12.7%
2000	10,741	−14.3%
2010	8,815	−17.9%
2020	6,481	−26.5%

== History ==
The area of Minamiōsumi was part of ancient Ōsumi Province. Remains from the Jomon and Yayoi Period have been found within town borders. During the Heian period it was the site of a large shōen landed estate ruled by the Neshin clan into the Sengoku period. Konene Port was active in this period with Nanban trade with Portuguese merchants and with trade to Ryukyu and Southeast Asia. During the Edo Period, the area was part of the holdings of Satsuma Domain. The villages of Sata and Konejime were established on May 1, 1889, with the creation of the modern municipalities system. The village of Nejime became the town of Nejime on January 1, 1941. The village of Sata became the town of Sata on September 1, 1947. Nejime and Sata were merged to become Minamiōsumi on March 31, 2005. The town name was chosen from among ideas submitted by the public.

== Government ==
Minamiōsumi has a mayor-council form of government with a directly elected mayor and a unicameral town council of 13 members. Minamiōsumi, collectively with the other municipalities of Kimotsuki District contributes one member to the Kagoshima Prefectural Assembly. In terms of national politics, the town is part of the Kagoshima 4th district of the lower house of the Diet of Japan.

The former Nejime Town Hall now serves as the Minamiōsumi Town Hall. The former Sata Town Hall is now a branch office.

== Economy ==
The economy of Minamiōsumi is based largely on agriculture and commercial fishing.

== Education ==
Minamiōsumi has two public elementary high schools and two public junior high school operated by the town government, and one public high school operated by the Kagoshima Prefectural Board of Education.

=== High schools ===
- Minamiōsumi High School.

=== Junior high schools ===
- Daiichi Sata Junior High School
- Nejime Junior High School

=== Elementary schools ===
- Kamiyama Elementary School
- Sata Elementary School

== Transportation ==
=== Railways ===
Minamiōsumi does not have any passenger railway service. Kagoshima-Chūō Station is the nearest Shinkansen station, and the town can also be reached by ferry from the JR Kyushu Ibusuki Makurazaki Line Yamakawa Station.

=== Highways ===
- National Route 269
- National Route 448

=== Maritime ===
- Port of Nejime
- Yamagawa-Nejime Ferry

== Local attractions ==
- Cape Sata, southernmost point of Japan's four main islands
- Former Sata Medicinal Garden, National Historic Site
- Nejime Onsen
- Ogawa Falls
- Wild growing Cycas revoluta, the so-called "Sago Palm"

=== Events ===
- Misaki Festival (February)
- Dragon Boat Festival (October)

== Notable people from Minamiōsumi ==
- Mire Aika (1964- ), actress
- Naoki Uchizono (1974- ), professional baseball player
