= Kōyama Castle =

Castle ruins in Kimotsuki, Kagoshima, Japan

- 高山城
- Kimotsuki, Kagoshima Japan
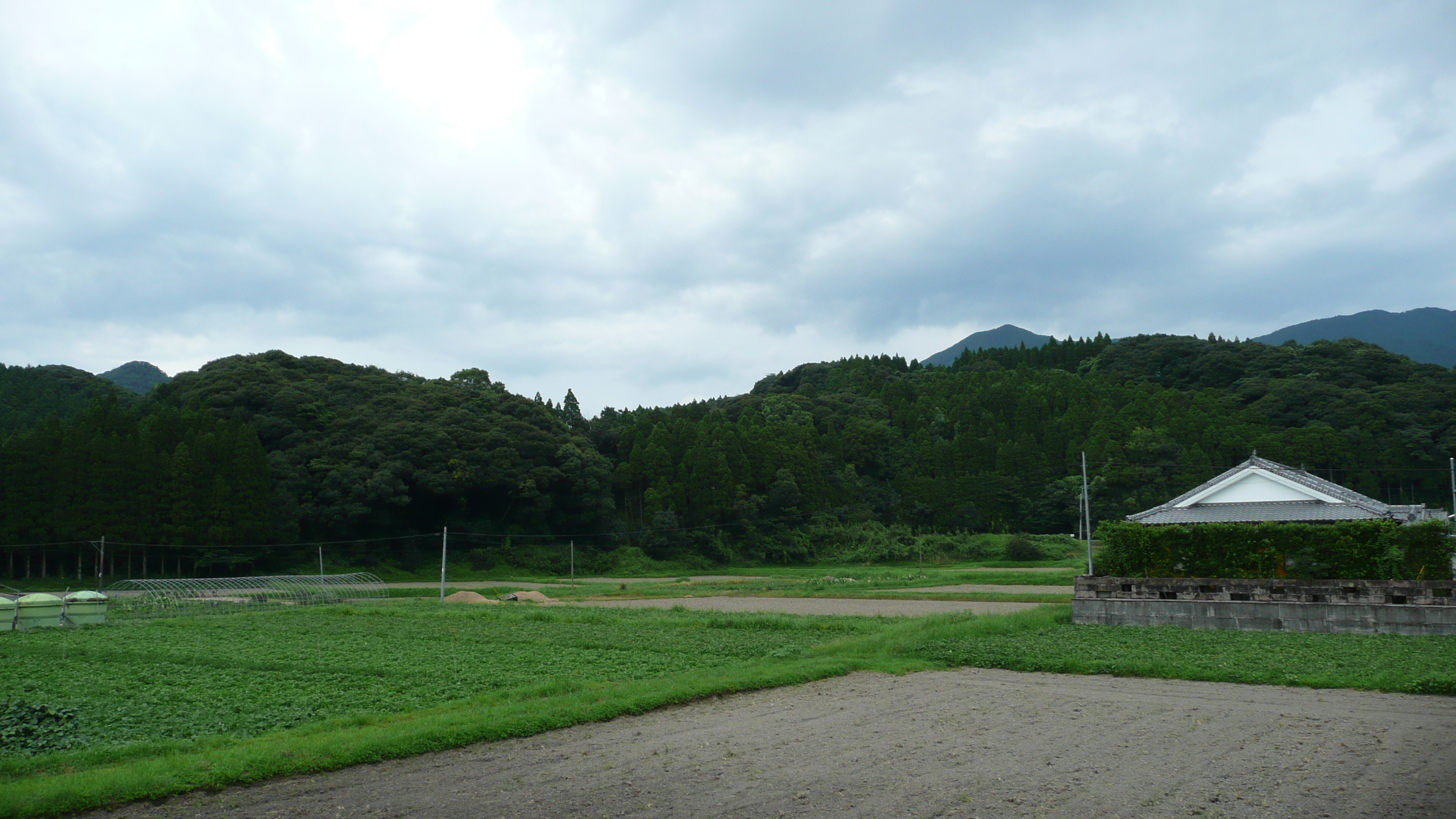
- Site of Kōyama Castle

Site information
- Type: yamajiro-style Japanese castle
- Controlled by: Kimotsuki clan
- Open to the public: yes
- Condition: Archaeological and designated national historical site; castle ruins

Location
- Coordinates: 31°19′2.8″N 130°57′56.4″E

Site history
- Built: Heian period
- Built by: Kimotsuki clan
- In use: Kamakura to Sengoku period
- National Historic Site of Japan

Kōyama Castle (高山城, Kōyama-jō) was a yamajiro-style Japanese castle located in the Shintomi-honjō neighborhood of the town of Kimotsuki, Kagoshima Prefecture, Japan. Its ruins have been protected as a National Historic Site since 1945.

== Overview ==
Kōyama Castle was located in a natural stronghold with the Honjō River to the south, the Kuriyama River to the north, the Takayama River to the west, and the steep cliffs of Shirasu Plateau to the east. Furthermore, a dry moat was created across the hilly area extending southwest from the mountain area, forming a curve. The castle was first constructed at the end of the Heian period when the descendants of Taira Kanesada, who was appointed as the benzai envoy (supervisor of the manor) of Shimazu shōen, came to this area and settled. Kanesada's son, Kanetoshi, took the name of "Kimotsuki", and his descendants ruled for 18 generations, or over 400 years until the end of the Sengoku period. The Kimotsuki clan ruled most of Ōsumi Province, and parts of Hyuga Province, including Obi Castle.

In the Sengoku period, Kimotsuki Kanetsugu balanced between the aggressive Shimazu clan of Satsuma Province, and the Ito clan of Hyūga Province; however, on his death the Kimotsuki came into conflict with the Shimazu clan and Kōyama Castle was surrendered to the Shimazu in 1573. The Kimotsuki clan continued to rule, albeit as retainers of the Shimazu, over significantly reduced territory until 1580, when they were transferred to Ata (present-day Kinpō-chō, Minamisatsuma), and Kōyama Castle was abandoned.

=== Present situation ===
Traces of the Honmaru Inner Bailey, which was located at an elevation of 82 meters on the mountain, as well as secondary enclosures divided by dry moats and earthworks remain and can via viewed by a hiking trail. The site is approximately one hour by car from Shibushi Station on the JR Kyushu Nichinan Line.

== See also ==
- List of Historic Sites of Japan (Kagoshima)

== Literature ==
- Benesch, Oleg and Ran Zwigenberg (2019). Japan's Castles: Citadels of Modernity in War and Peace. Cambridge: Cambridge University Press. p. 374. ISBN 9781108481946.
- De Lange, William (2021). An Encyclopedia of Japanese Castles. Groningen: Toyo Press. pp. 600 pages. ISBN 978-9492722300.
