= Kimotsuki, Kagoshima =

Kimotsuki 肝付町
- Town
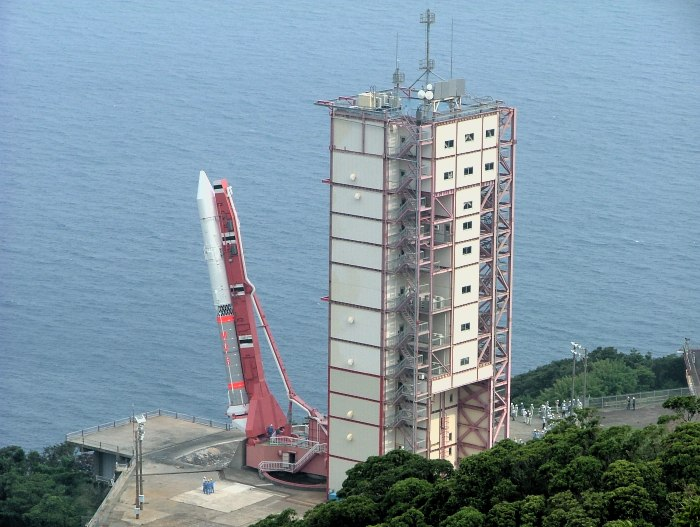
- Uchinoura Space Center

- Flag Emblem
- Interactive map of Kimotsuki
- Location in Japan
- Coordinates: 31°20′40″N 130°56′43″E
- Country: Japan
- Region: Kyushu
- Prefecture: Kagoshima
- District: Kimotsuki

Government
  - Mayor: Nagano Kazuyuki

Area
  - Total: 308.04 km^{2} (118.93 sq mi)

Population (April 30, 2024)
  - Total: 13,766
  - Density: 44.689/km^{2} (115.74/sq mi)
- Time zone: UTC+09:00 (JST)
- City hall address: 98 Nitomi Kimotsuki-chō, Kimotsuki-gun, Kagoshima-ken 893-1207
- Climate: Cfa
- Website: Official website
- Symbols
- Flower: Chrysanthemum
- Tree: Camphor

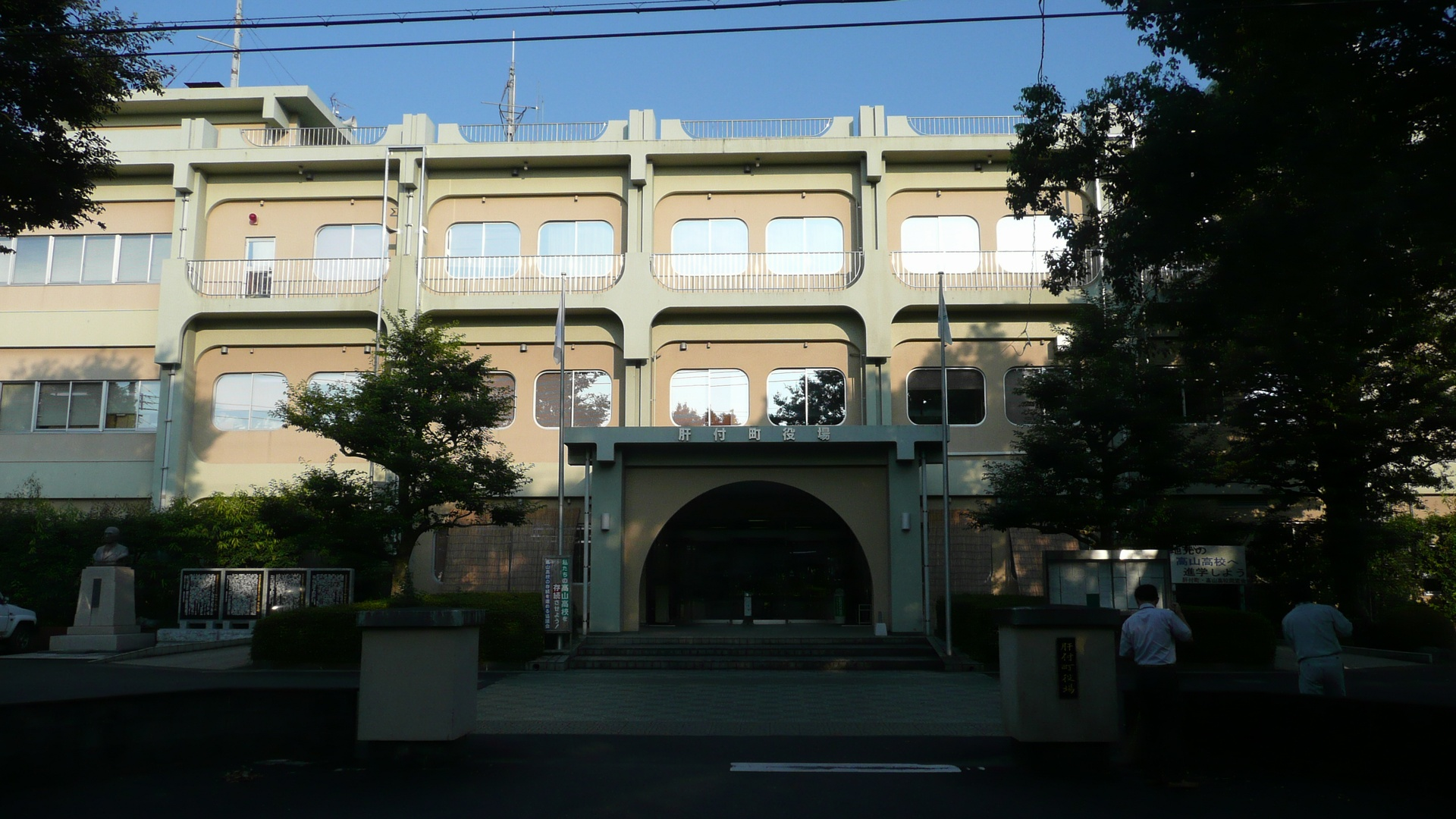
Kimotsuki Town Hall

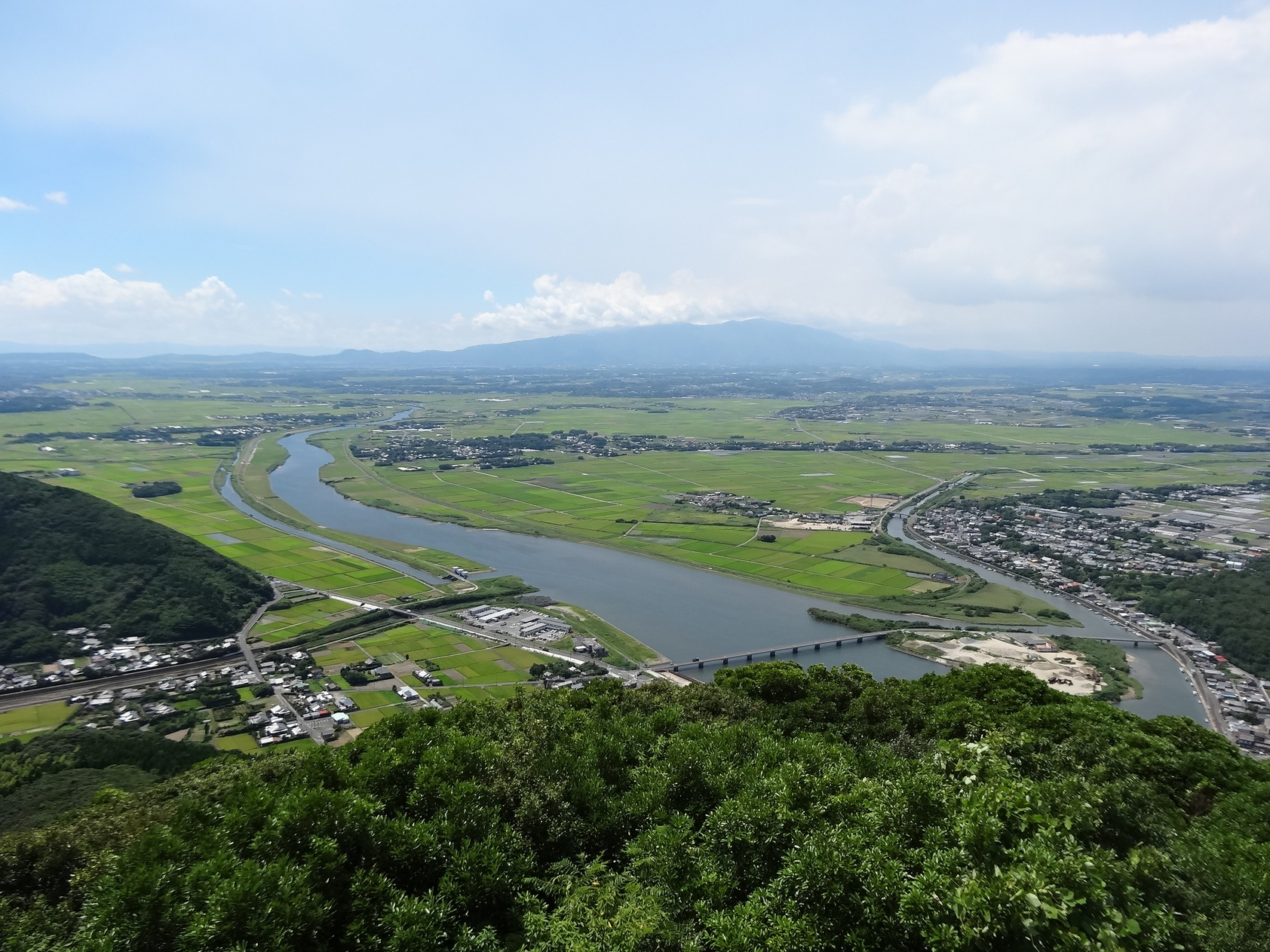
Kimotsuki River

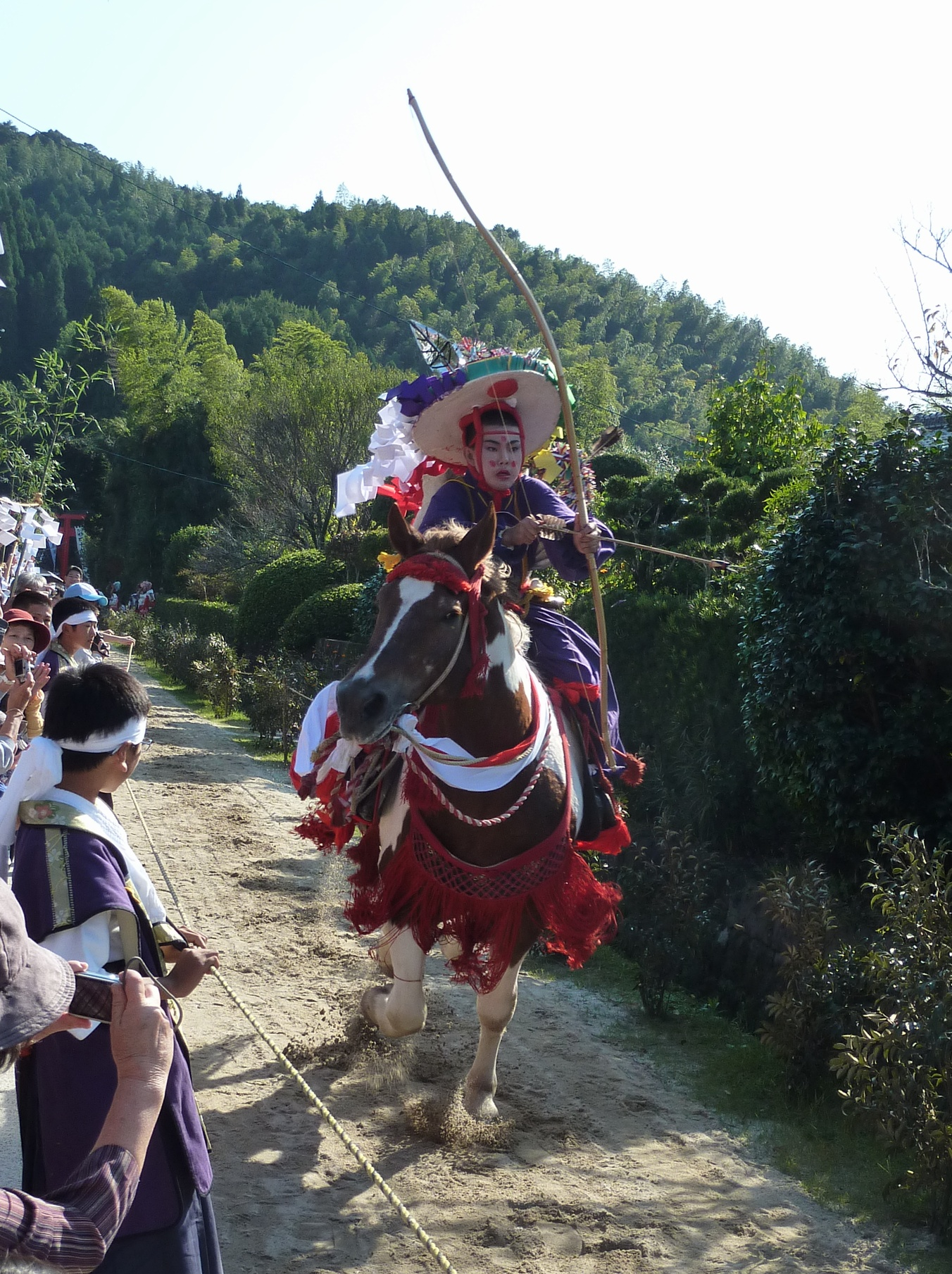
Yabusame in Kimitsuki

Kimotsuki (肝付町, Kimotsuki-chō) is a town in Kimotsuki District. As of 30 April 2024, the town had an estimated population of 13,766 in 7503 households, and a population density of 45 persons per km^{2}. The total area of the town is 308.04 km^{2} (118.93 sq mi).

== Geography ==
Kimotsuki located in the eastern part of the Ōsumi Peninsula. The alluvial plain of the Kimabe River extends to the northwestern part of the town, however, most of the town's area is occupied by mountains that form part of the Kimabe Mountains. The Kasanohara Plateau, which is famous as the Shirasu Plateau, spreads out at in northwest. The Kinosuke River flows near the border with Kanoya. The town faces Shibushi Bay to the northeast, Uchinoura Bay to the east, and the Pacific Ocean to the southeast. The former Takayama Town in the northwest and the former Uchinoura Town in the southeast are separated by Mount Kunimi, and it used to take more than 30 minutes to travel between the centers of both towns via Japan National Route 448. The Kunimi Tunnel (Kagoshima Prefectural Route 561), which runs through Mt. Kunimi, was opened in 2002, greatly shortened travel time. In addition, the Shibushi National Petroleum Reserve Base, which was created by reclaiming off the coast of Shibushi Bay, belongs to Kimotsuki.

=== Neighboring municipalities ===
Kagoshima Prefecture

- Higashikushira
- Kanoya
- Kinkō
- Minamiōsumi

=== Climate ===
Kimotsuki has a humid subtropical climate (Köppen climate classification Cfa) with hot summers and mild winters. Precipitation is significant throughout the year, and is heavier in summer, especially the months of June and July. The average annual temperature in Kimotsuki is 17.5 °C (63.5 °F). The average annual rainfall is 2,747.6 mm (108.17 in) with June as the wettest month. The temperatures are highest on average in August, at around 27.2 °C (81.0 °F), and lowest in January, at around 7.6 °C (45.7 °F). Its record high is 39.2 °C (102.6 °F), reached on 2 August 2026, and its record low is −6.4 °C (20.5 °F), reached on 25 January 2016.

Climate data for Kimotsuki (1991−2020 normals, extremes 1977−present)
Month	Jan	Feb	Mar	Apr	May	Jun	Jul	Aug	Sep	Oct	Nov	Dec	Year
Record high °C (°F)	24.3 (75.7)	24.3 (75.7)	27.3 (81.1)	29.7 (85.5)	34.3 (93.7)	34.2 (93.6)	38.7 (101.7)	39.2 (102.6)	35.7 (96.3)	34.1 (93.4)	29.3 (84.7)	25.1 (77.2)	39.2 (102.6)
Mean daily maximum °C (°F)	13.1 (55.6)	14.5 (58.1)	17.4 (63.3)	21.8 (71.2)	25.3 (77.5)	27.0 (80.6)	31.4 (88.5)	31.9 (89.4)	29.4 (84.9)	25.1 (77.2)	20.1 (68.2)	15.2 (59.4)	22.7 (72.8)
Daily mean °C (°F)	7.6 (45.7)	8.8 (47.8)	11.8 (53.2)	16.2 (61.2)	20.1 (68.2)	23.0 (73.4)	26.9 (80.4)	27.2 (81.0)	24.5 (76.1)	19.7 (67.5)	14.5 (58.1)	9.4 (48.9)	17.5 (63.5)
Mean daily minimum °C (°F)	2.4 (36.3)	3.4 (38.1)	6.5 (43.7)	10.9 (51.6)	15.4 (59.7)	19.7 (67.5)	23.5 (74.3)	23.8 (74.8)	20.8 (69.4)	15.1 (59.2)	9.4 (48.9)	4.0 (39.2)	12.9 (55.2)
Record low °C (°F)	−6.4 (20.5)	−6.0 (21.2)	−3.5 (25.7)	0.6 (33.1)	5.3 (41.5)	11.2 (52.2)	15.3 (59.5)	17.2 (63.0)	10.6 (51.1)	2.5 (36.5)	−1.8 (28.8)	−4.9 (23.2)	−6.4 (20.5)
Average precipitation mm (inches)	81.9 (3.22)	115.6 (4.55)	167.0 (6.57)	193.5 (7.62)	214.3 (8.44)	579.5 (22.81)	384.6 (15.14)	294.3 (11.59)	352.6 (13.88)	169.7 (6.68)	112.1 (4.41)	82.6 (3.25)	2,747.6 (108.17)
Average precipitation days (≥ 1.0 mm)	8.2	9.0	12.2	11.0	10.8	17.4	12.5	13.2	12.1	8.2	8.1	7.4	130.1
Mean monthly sunshine hours	138.3	141.2	160.9	168.7	161.7	96.7	177.0	191.1	155.4	170.2	151.2	140.8	1,852.9
Source: Japan Meteorological Agency

Climate data for Uchinoura, Kimotsuki (1991−2020 normals, extremes 1977−present)
Month	Jan	Feb	Mar	Apr	May	Jun	Jul	Aug	Sep	Oct	Nov	Dec	Year
Record high °C (°F)	23.8 (74.8)	24.4 (75.9)	27.5 (81.5)	29.3 (84.7)	33.1 (91.6)	33.9 (93.0)	37.2 (99.0)	38.5 (101.3)	34.6 (94.3)	33.5 (92.3)	31.2 (88.2)	24.6 (76.3)	38.5 (101.3)
Mean daily maximum °C (°F)	13.6 (56.5)	14.8 (58.6)	17.6 (63.7)	21.7 (71.1)	25.2 (77.4)	27.3 (81.1)	31.5 (88.7)	32.0 (89.6)	29.5 (85.1)	25.4 (77.7)	20.6 (69.1)	15.7 (60.3)	22.9 (73.2)
Daily mean °C (°F)	8.7 (47.7)	9.8 (49.6)	12.6 (54.7)	16.6 (61.9)	20.2 (68.4)	23.2 (73.8)	26.9 (80.4)	27.3 (81.1)	24.9 (76.8)	20.4 (68.7)	15.4 (59.7)	10.6 (51.1)	18.1 (64.5)
Mean daily minimum °C (°F)	3.8 (38.8)	4.8 (40.6)	7.7 (45.9)	11.5 (52.7)	15.5 (59.9)	19.7 (67.5)	23.2 (73.8)	23.8 (74.8)	21.3 (70.3)	16.1 (61.0)	10.7 (51.3)	5.6 (42.1)	13.6 (56.6)
Record low °C (°F)	−5.2 (22.6)	−5.3 (22.5)	−2.4 (27.7)	1.8 (35.2)	4.6 (40.3)	10.6 (51.1)	14.7 (58.5)	17.9 (64.2)	12.3 (54.1)	5.6 (42.1)	0.4 (32.7)	−2.8 (27.0)	−5.3 (22.5)
Average precipitation mm (inches)	116.4 (4.58)	175.3 (6.90)	260.2 (10.24)	323.4 (12.73)	323.3 (12.73)	666.6 (26.24)	368.2 (14.50)	244.0 (9.61)	352.1 (13.86)	186.6 (7.35)	167.2 (6.58)	115.3 (4.54)	3,233.5 (127.30)
Average precipitation days (≥ 1.0 mm)	8.1	9.4	12.7	11.1	11.6	17.6	12.0	13.4	13.2	9.1	8.6	7.8	134.6
Mean monthly sunshine hours	140.7	131.9	153.6	162.8	165.2	96.6	181.2	184.5	143.5	157.9	145.7	138.6	1,802
Source: Japan Meteorological Agency

== Demographics ==
Per Japanese census data, the population of Kimotsuki in 2020 is 14,227 people. Kimotsuki has been conducting censuses since 1920. The town's population peaked in the 1950s and has been slowly declining since then, with no sign of a recovery until 2020.

Historical population

Year	Pop.	±%
1920	20,967	—
1925	22,994	+9.7%
1930	25,529	+11.0%
1935	26,685	+4.5%
1940	26,875	+0.7%
1945	32,402	+20.6%
1950	33,813	+4.4%
1955	34,372	+1.7%
1960	32,553	−5.3%
1965	29,619	−9.0%
1970	25,433	−14.1%

Year	Pop.	±%
1975	23,892	−6.1%
1980	23,361	−2.2%
1985	22,955	−1.7%
1990	21,542	−6.2%
1995	20,317	−5.7%
2000	19,523	−3.9%
2005	18,307	−6.2%
2010	17,156	−6.3%
2015	15,664	−8.7%
2020	14,227	−9.2%

Kimotsuki population statistics

== History ==
The area of Kimotsuki was part of ancient Ōsumi Province. The area has may remains from the Kofun period. The Kimotsuki clan ruled the area from the mid-Heian period to the end of the Sengoku period. During the Edo Period, the area was part of the holdings of Satsuma Domain. The villages of Kōyama and Uchinoura were established on May 1, 1889, with the creation of the modern municipalities system. Both Kōyama and Uchinoura were raised to town status in 1932. The town of Kimotsuki was founded on July 1, 2005, from the merger of the towns of Kōyama and Uchinoura.

== Government ==
Kimotsuki has a mayor-council form of government with a directly elected mayor and a unicameral town council of 14 members. Kimotsuki, collectively with the other municipalities of Kimotsuki District, contributes one member to the Kagoshima Prefectural Assembly. In terms of national politics, the town is part of the Kagoshima 4th district of the lower house of the Diet of Japan.

== Economy ==
The economy of Kimotsuki is based largely on agriculture and commercial fishing.

== Education ==
Kimotsuki has five public elementary high schools, four public junior high schools and one public high operated by the town government. The town has one public high school operated by the Kagoshima Prefectural Board of Education, and one private combined middle/high school.

== Transportation ==
=== Railways ===
Kimotsuki does not have any passenger railway service. The nearest major station is Kagoshima-Chūō Station on the Kyushu Shinkansen.

=== Highways ===
- National Route 220
- National Route 448

== Local attractions ==
- Kōyama Castle ruins (National Historic Site)
- Nikaido House (National Important Cultural Property)
- Osumi Nanbu Prefectural Natural Park
- Shijukusho Shrine
- Todoro Falls
- Tsukazaki Kofun Cluster (National Historic Site)
- Uchinoura Space Center
- Yabusame Public Park

=== Events and festivals ===
- Doya Doya Sa (January 7)
- Staff and sickle dances (March)
- Nagoshidon (mid-August)
- Honmachi Hachigatsu Odori (Fourth Saturday of August, every even year)
- Eggane Festival (September or October)
- Yabusame Festival (Third Sunday of October)
- Uchinoura Galaxy Marathon, commemorating the formation of the Republic of Uchinoura and the Galaxy Federation (November)

=== Mascots ===
Kimotsuki has two town mascots (see yuru-chara) created by the Kimotsuki Tourism Association. Both wear purple outfits based on the traditional costume of the Yabusame Festival archer and have satellite heads. They generally make appearances at town sanctioned events.

- Itemaru-kun: An alien born in 2010 when asteroid-explorer Hayabusa returned to earth.
- Hayabusame-kun: A sea turtle, named by combining the words "hayabusa" and "yabusame."

== Sister cities ==
=== The Galaxy Federation ===
Before the merger, the town of Uchinoura was a part of the Galaxy Federation, a chain of friendship cities that each house a JAXA space center. It joined the federation as a founding member on November 8, 1987, and received the name the Republic of Uchinoura. The friendship city relations were still retained when Uchinoura merged with Koyama to become Kimotsuki town, and it is now called the Republic of Uchinoura Kimotsuki within the federation. The most recent member of the federation, the city of Kakuda in Miyagi Prefecture, joined on April 2, 2016.

- Ofunato, Iwate (The Republic of Sanriku Ofunato)
- Noshiro, Akita (The Republic of Noshiro)
- Sagamihara, Kanagawa (The Republic of Sagamihara)
- Saku, Nagano (The Republic of Saku)
- Taiki, Hokkaido (The Republic of Taiki)

=== Space Brother Cities ===
Kimotsuki and the town of Minamitane, home to Tanegashima's JAXA space center, signed the “Space Brother Cities Declaration” on July 3, 2013. The naming comes from the manga and anime series Space Brothers, and the official document even features an illustration of the two main characters, the Nanba brothers.

== Noted people from Kimotsuki ==
- Susumu Nikaidō, politician
