= Kagoshima Prefecture =

Prefecture of Japan

Coordinates: 31°24′N 130°31′E

Kagoshima Prefecture 鹿児島県
- Prefecture

Japanese transcription(s)
  - Japanese: 鹿児島県
  - Rōmaji: Kagoshima-ken
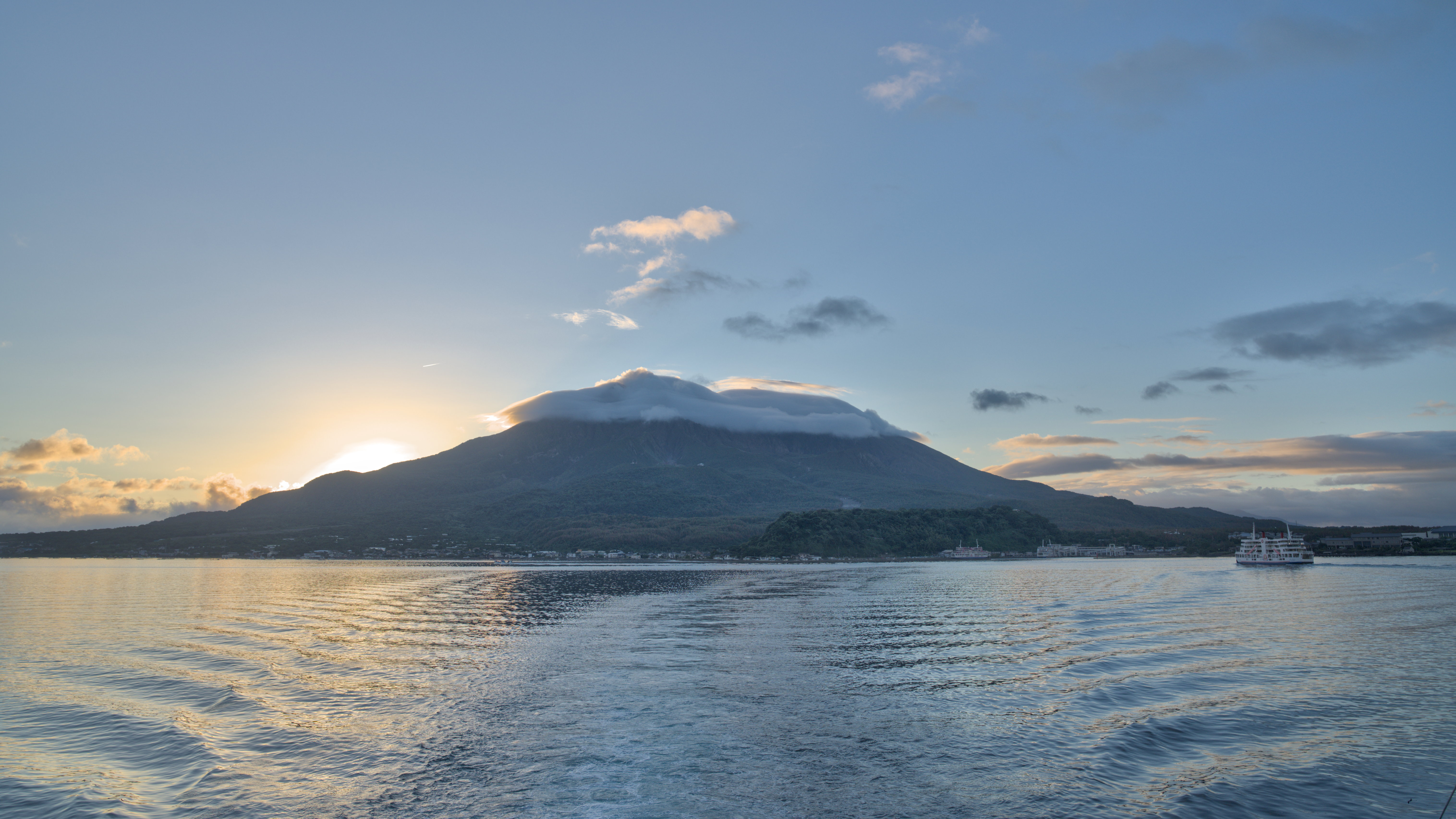
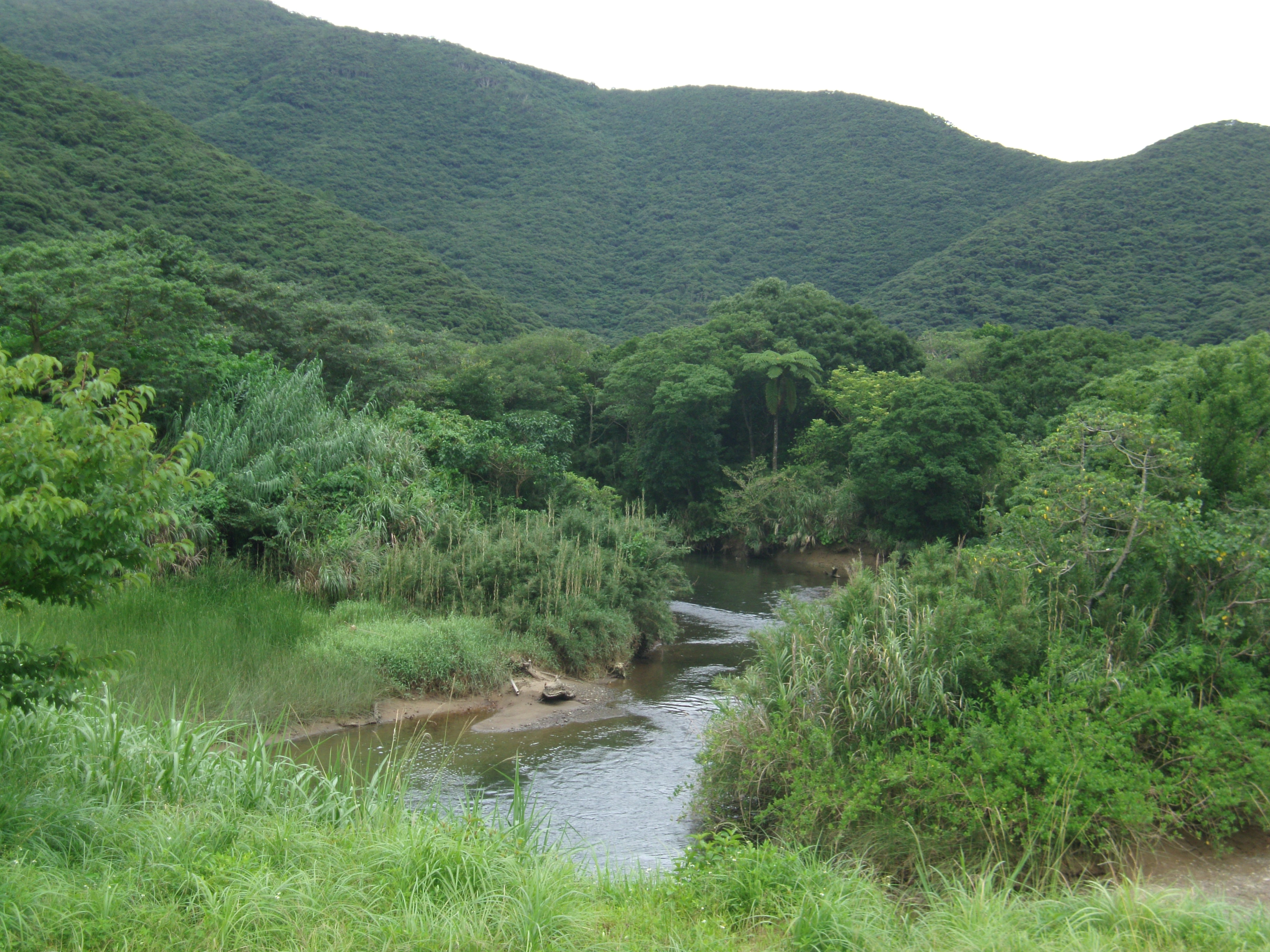
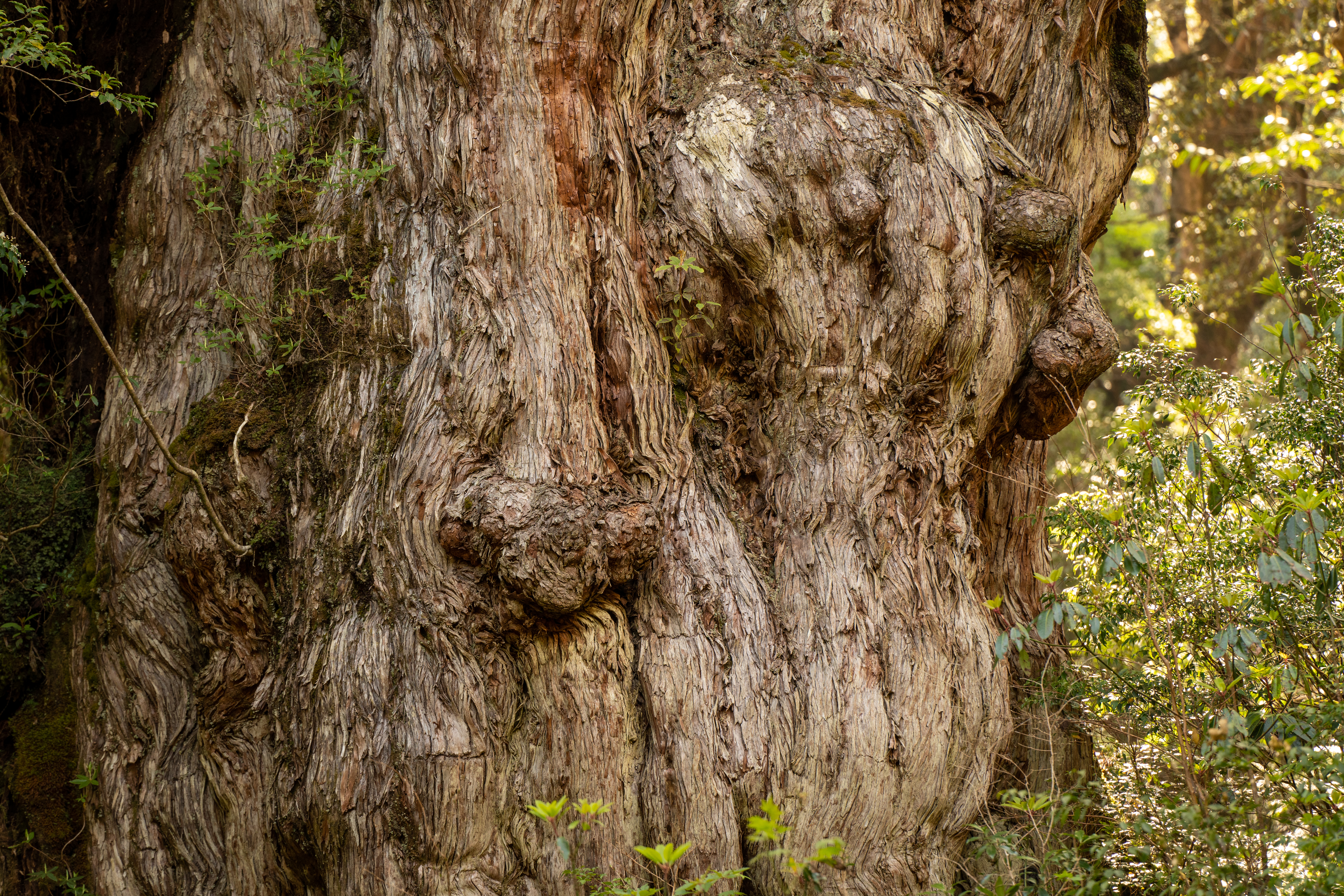
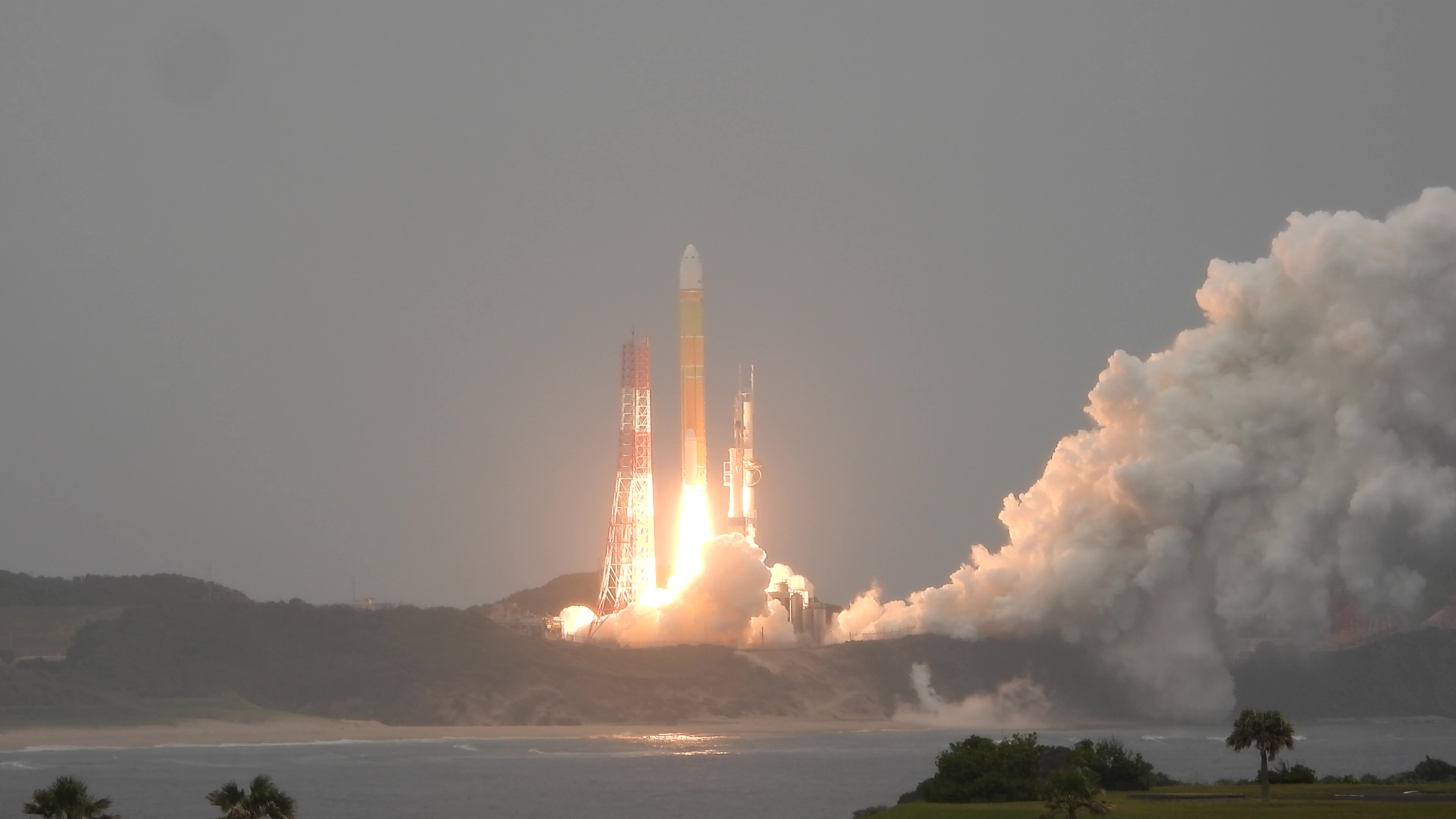
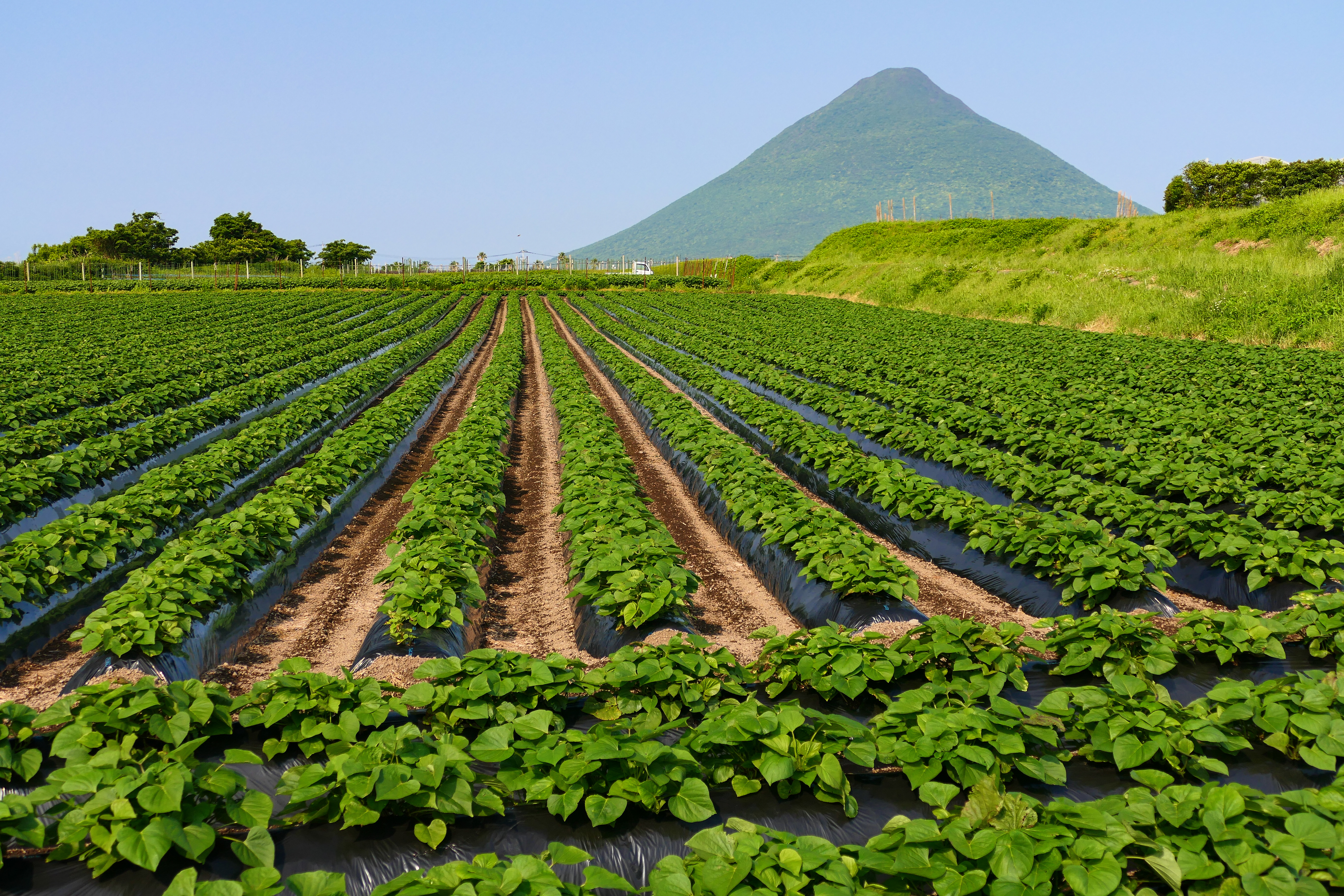
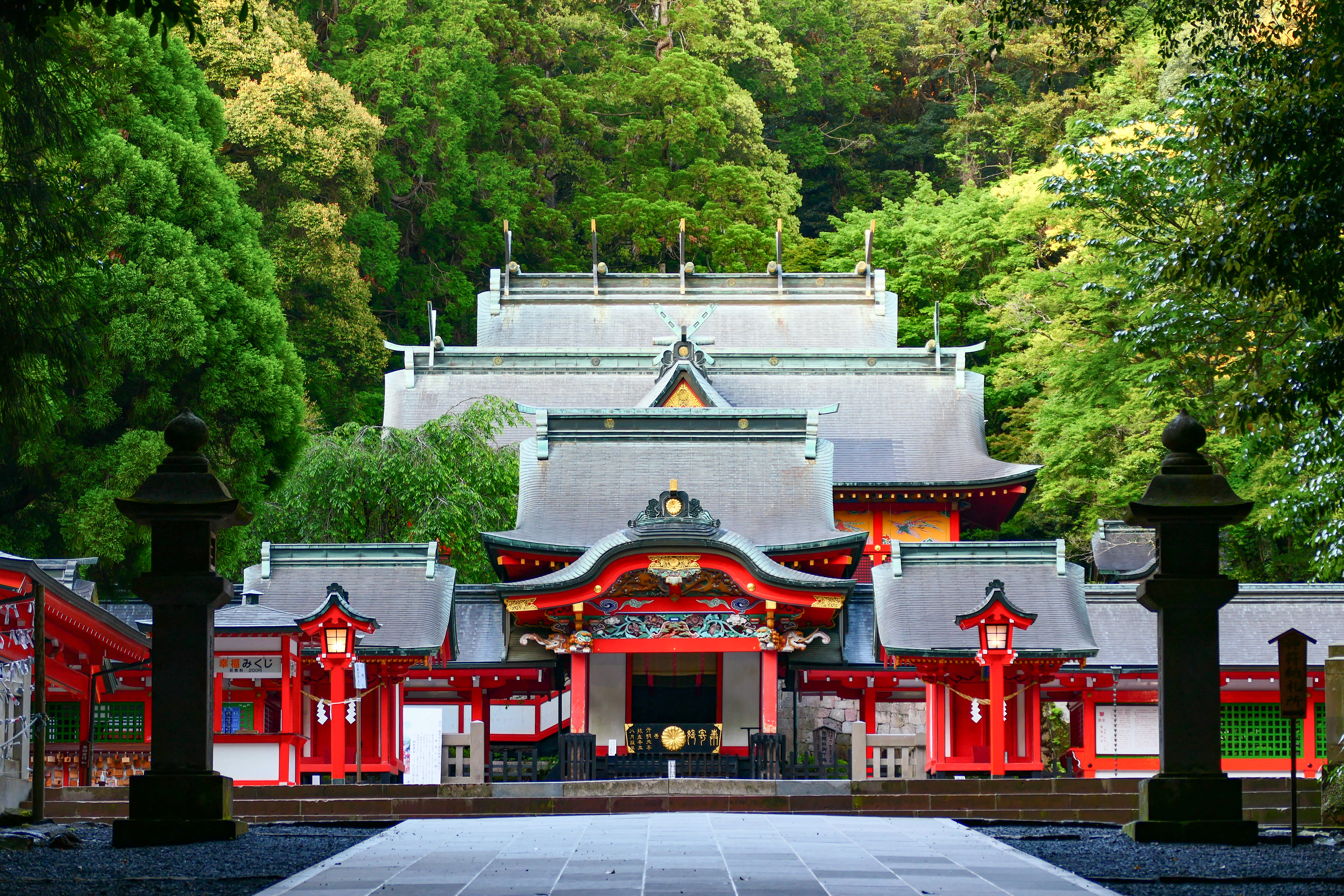
- View of Sakurajima from Kagoshima Bay A mangrove forest in Amami Island Jōmon Cedar in Yakushima Tanegashima Space Center Kaimondake and sweet potato field in Ibusuki Kirishima Shrine

- Flag Emblem Symbol
- Anthem: Kagoshima kenmin no uta
- Country: Japan
- Region: Kyushu
- Island: Kyushu
- Capital: Kagoshima
- Subdivisions: Districts: 8, Municipalities: 43

Government
  - Governor: Kōichi Shiota

Area
  - Total: 9,187.01 km^{2} (3,547.12 sq mi)
  - Rank: 10th

Population (October 1, 2026)
  - Total: 1,495,249
  - Rank: 24th
  - Density: 162.757/km^{2} (421.538/sq mi)

GDP
  - Total: JP¥6,048 billion; US$44.7 billion (2022)
- ISO 3166 code: JP-46
- Website: www.pref.kagoshima.jp/foreign/english/index.html
- Symbols of Japan
- Bird: Lidth's jay (Garrulus lidthi)
- Flower: Miyamakirishima (Rhododendron kiusianum)
- Tree: Camphor laurel (Cinnamomum camphora)

Kagoshima Prefecture (鹿児島県, Kagoshima-ken; Japanese pronunciation: [kä̀.ɡó̞.ɕí.mä́(.kè̞ɴ̀), -ŋó̞-], locally [kä̀.ɡó̞ɕ.mä̀, -ɡò̞ɕ.mä́.kè̞ɴ̀]) is a prefecture of Japan located on the island of Kyushu and the Ryukyu Islands. Kagoshima Prefecture has a population of 1,527,019 (1 February 2025) and has a geographic area of 9,187 km^{2} (3,547 sq mi). Kagoshima Prefecture borders Kumamoto Prefecture to the north and Miyazaki Prefecture to the northeast.

Kagoshima is the capital and largest city of Kagoshima Prefecture, with other major cities including Kirishima, Kanoya, and Satsumasendai. Kagoshima Prefecture is located at the southernmost point of Kyūshū and includes the Satsunan Islands group of the Ryukyu Islands. Kagoshima Prefecture's mainland territory extends from the Ariake Sea to Shibushi Bay on the Pacific Ocean coast, and is characterized by two large peninsulas created by Kagoshima Bay. Kagoshima Prefecture formed the core of the Satsuma Domain, ruled from Kagoshima Castle, one of the most important Japanese domains of the Edo period and the Meiji Restoration.

== History ==
Kagoshima Prefecture corresponds to the ancient Japanese provinces Ōsumi and Satsuma, including the northern part of the Ryukyu Islands (Satsunan). This region played a key role in the Meiji Restoration (Saigō Takamori), and the city of Kagoshima was an important naval base during Japan's 20th century wars and the home of admiral Tōgō Heihachirō. More recent incidents are the sinking of a North Korean spy ship (100 ton class) in 2001 by the Coast Guard, which was later salvaged and exhibited in Tokyo, and the abduction of an office clerk and her boyfriend from a Kagoshima beach in 1978 by agents from the same country. This became known only recently under the Koizumi administration.

== Demographics ==
The two main ethnic groups of Kagoshima Prefecture are the Japanese and the Ryukyuans (Amami Islands).

== Geography ==
Kagoshima Prefecture is located at the southwest tip of Kyushu on the Satsuma Peninsula and Ōsumi Peninsula. This prefecture also includes a chain of islands stretching further to the southwest of Kyushu for a few hundred kilometers. The most important group is the Amami Islands. Surrounded by the East China Sea to the west, Okinawa Prefecture in the south, Kumamoto Prefecture to the north, and Miyazaki Prefecture to the east, it has 2,632 km (1,635 mi) of coastline (including the 28 islands). It has a bay called Kagoshima Bay (Kinkowan), which is sandwiched by two peninsulas, Satsuma and Ōsumi. Its position made it a 'gateway' to Japan at various times in history. While Kyushu has about 13 million people, there are less than 2 million in this prefecture.

The prefecture boasts a chain of active and dormant volcanoes, including the great Sakurajima, which towers out of the Kagoshima bay opposite Kagoshima city. A steady trickle of smoke and ash emerges from the caldera, punctuated by louder mini-eruptions on an almost daily basis. On active days in Kagoshima city an umbrella is advisable to ward off the ash. Sakurajima is one of Japan's most active volcanoes. Major eruptions occurred in 1914, when the island mountain spilled enough material to become permanently connected to the mainland, and a lesser eruption in 1960. Volcanic materials in the soil make Sakurajima a source for record daikon radishes, roughly the size of a basketball. Many beaches around the Kagoshima Bay are littered with well-worn pumice stones. A crater lake in the southwestern tip of the prefecture, near the spa town of Ibusuki, is home to a rare species of giant eel.

As of 31 March 2019, 13% of the total land area of the prefecture was designated as Natural Parks, namely the Amami Guntō, Kirishima-Kinkowan, Unzen-Amakusa, and Yakushima National Parks; Koshikishima and Nichinan Kaigan Quasi-National Parks; and Akune, Bōnoma, Fukiagehama, Imutaike, Ōsumi Nanbu, Sendaigawa Ryūiki, Takakumayama, and Tokara Rettō Prefectural Natural Parks.

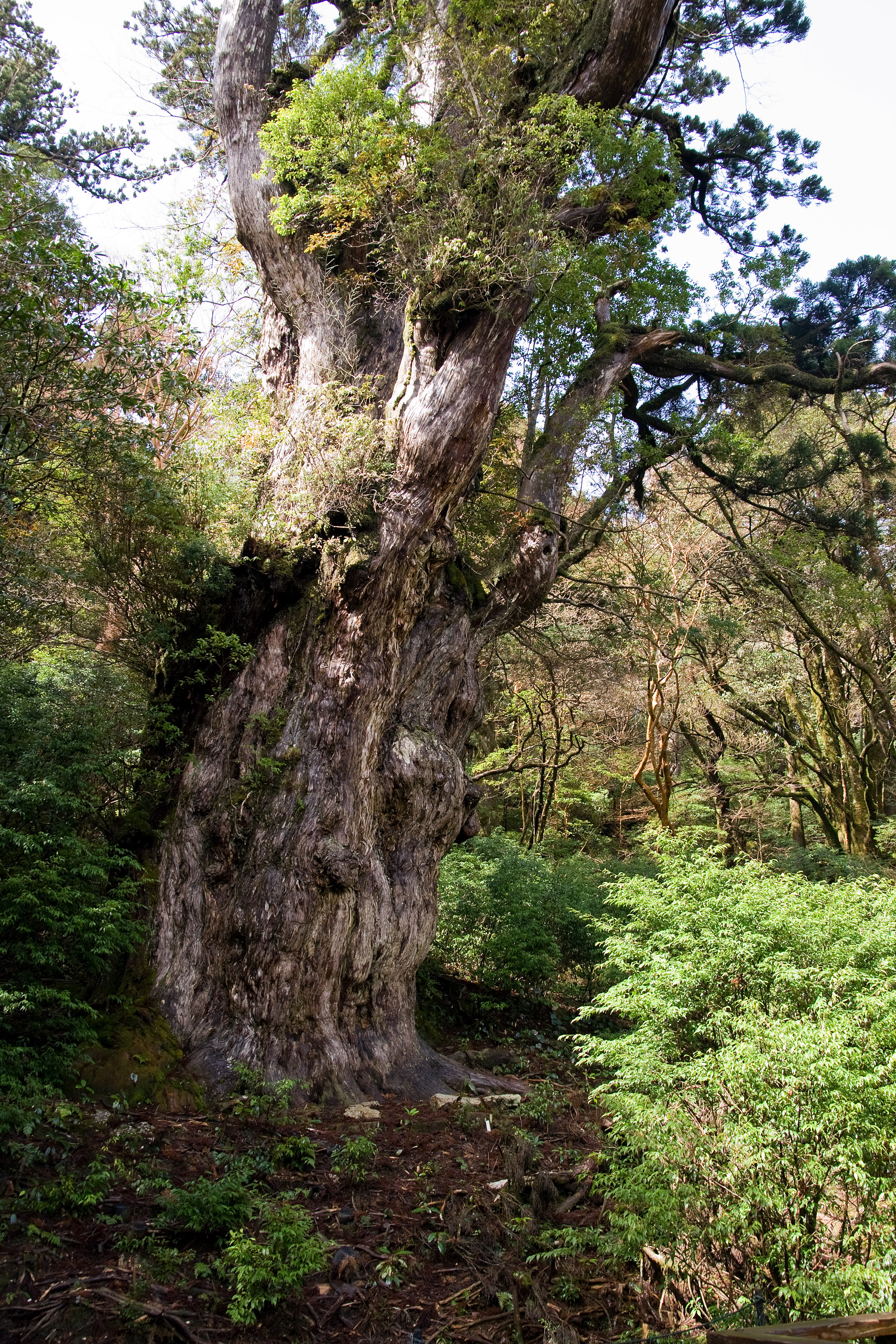
Jōmon Sugi in Yaku Island

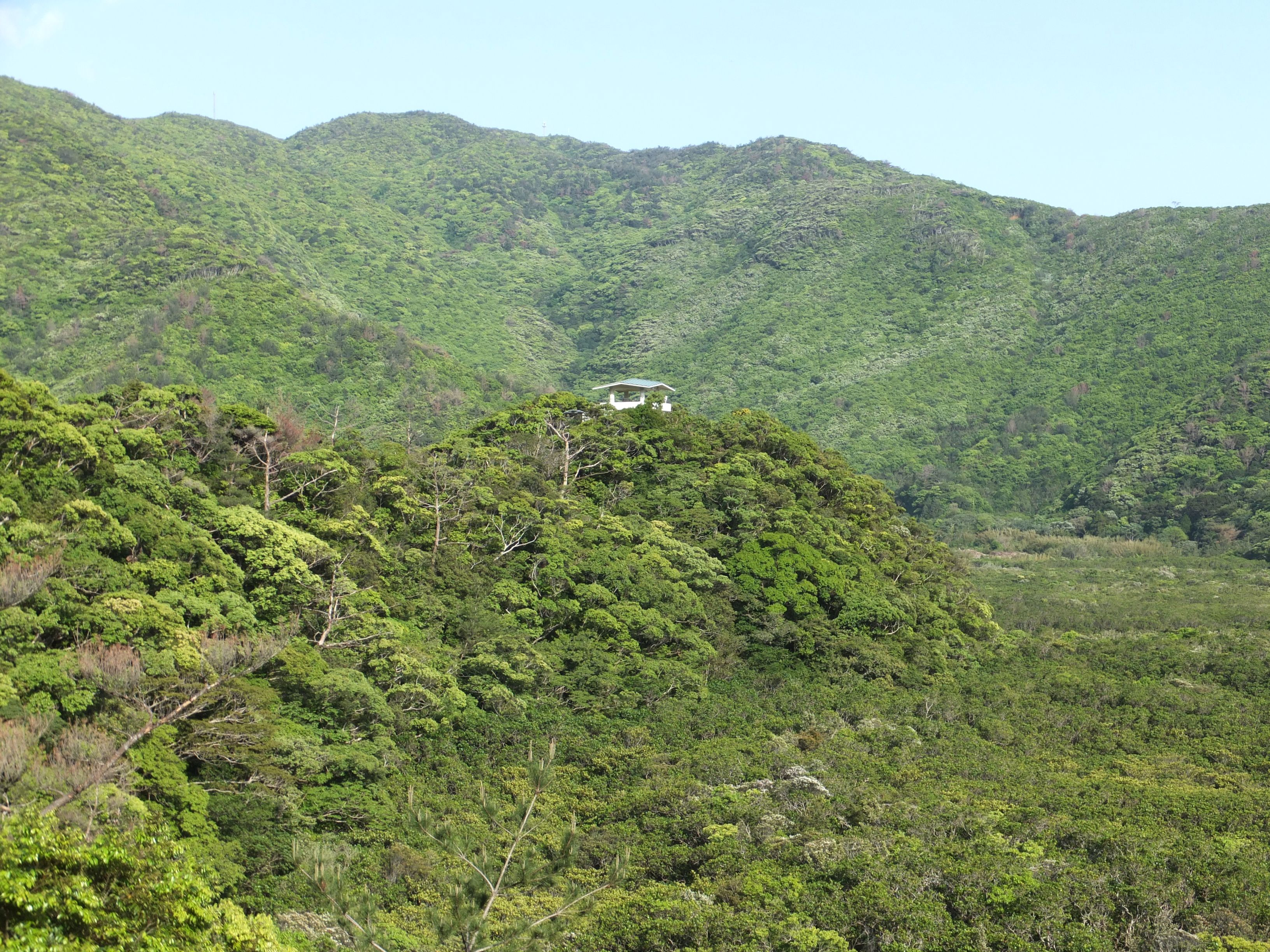
Mangrove native forest in Amami Island

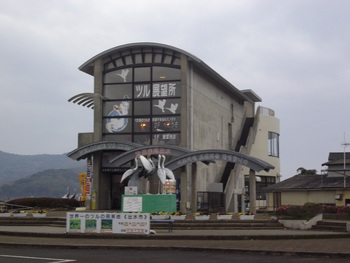
A crane observation centre in Izumi crane migration grounds

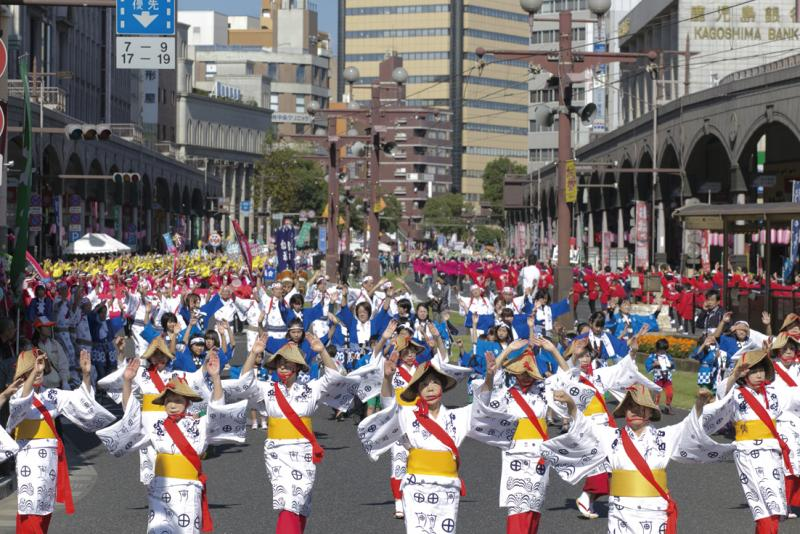
Ohara style folk dance in Kagoshima Ohara Festival in November

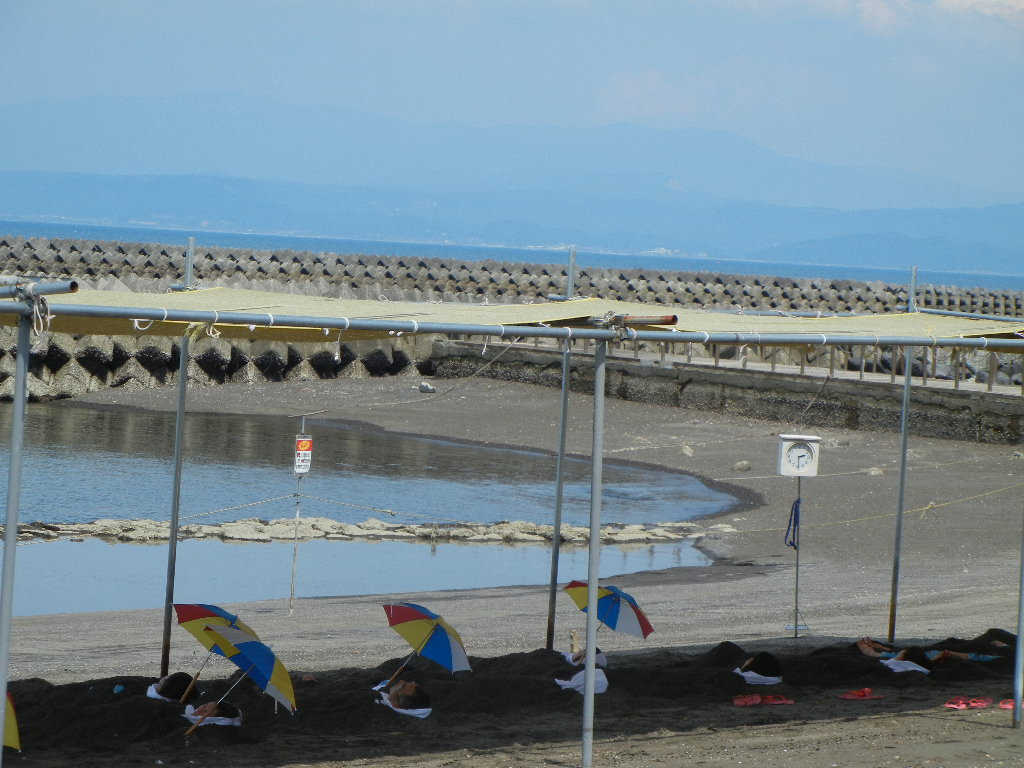
Sand bath style in Ibusuki Spa

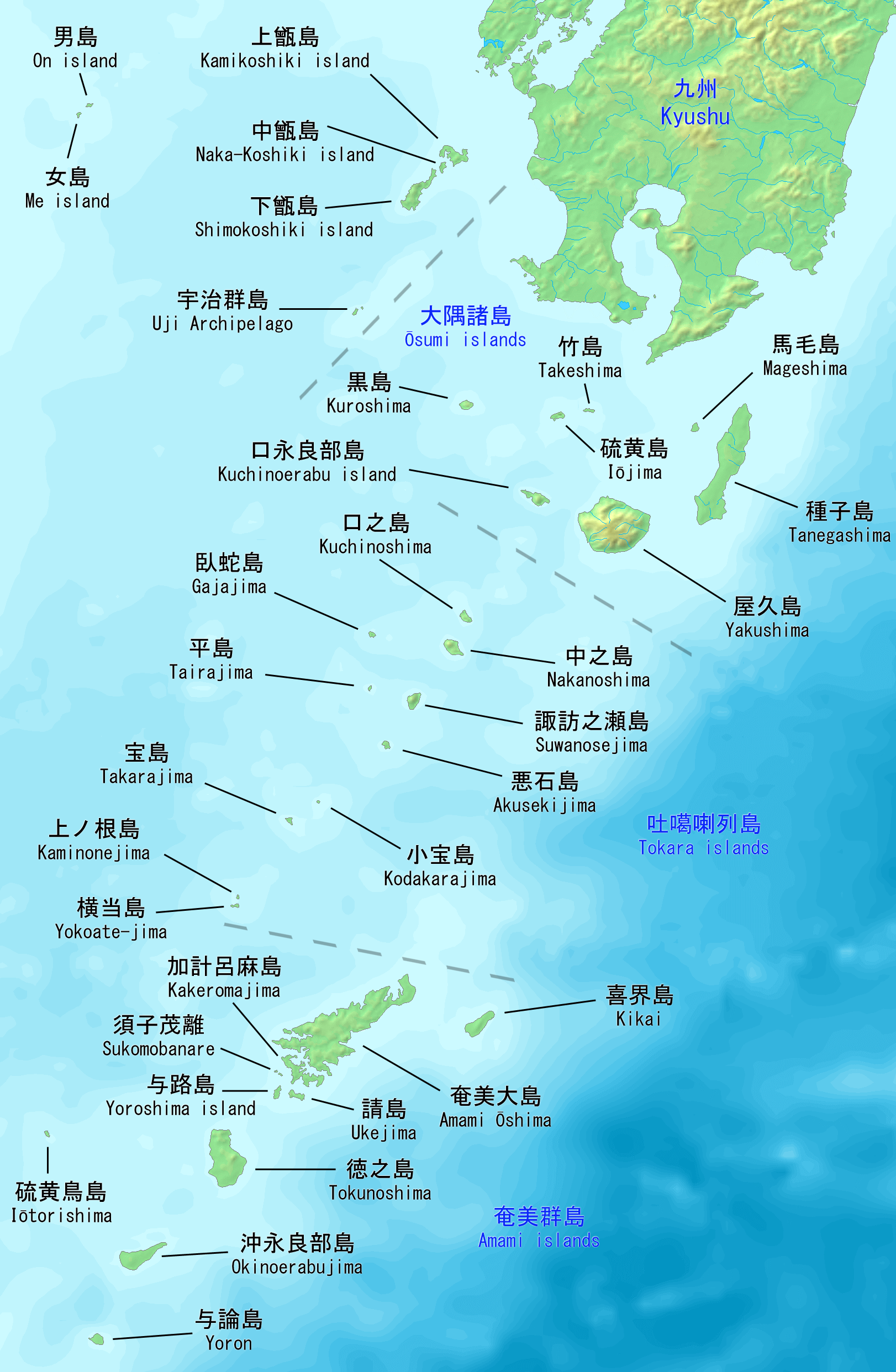
Map of Kagoshima Prefecture

== Economy ==
Most of the economic sector is focused in Kagoshima City and the surrounding area, corresponding to the extent of the former Satsuma Province. The eastern part of the prefecture, the former Ōsumi Province, is mostly rural and shows a general population decline.

The prefecture has strong agricultural roots, which are reflected in its most well-known exports: green tea, sweet potato, radish, Pongee rice, Satsuma ware, Berkshire pork ("kurobuta") and local Black Wagyu beef. Kagoshima prefecture's production of bonito flakes is second only to that of Shizuoka. In addition, it produces Japan's largest volume of unagi eels. Kagoshima is also the largest beef-producing and pork-producing prefecture in Japan.

The Japan Aerospace Exploration Agency (JAXA) has several facilities within the prefecture, including the country's main launch facility on Tanegashima and the Uchinoura Space Center.

The prefecture's gross domestic product is approximately 5,548.7 trillion yen, with a work force of about 791,000 people (2018).

== Municipalities ==
Map of Kagoshima Prefecture City Town Village

The following is a list of Kagoshima Prefecture's cities, and its administrative districts with their constituent towns and villages:

=== Cities ===
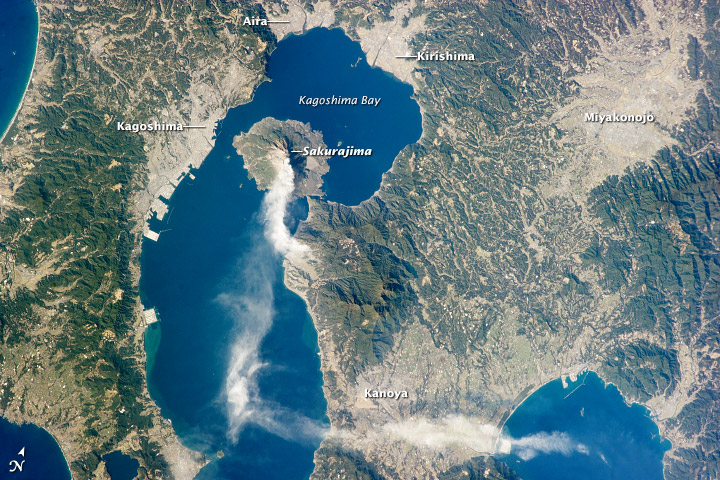
Kagoshima from space

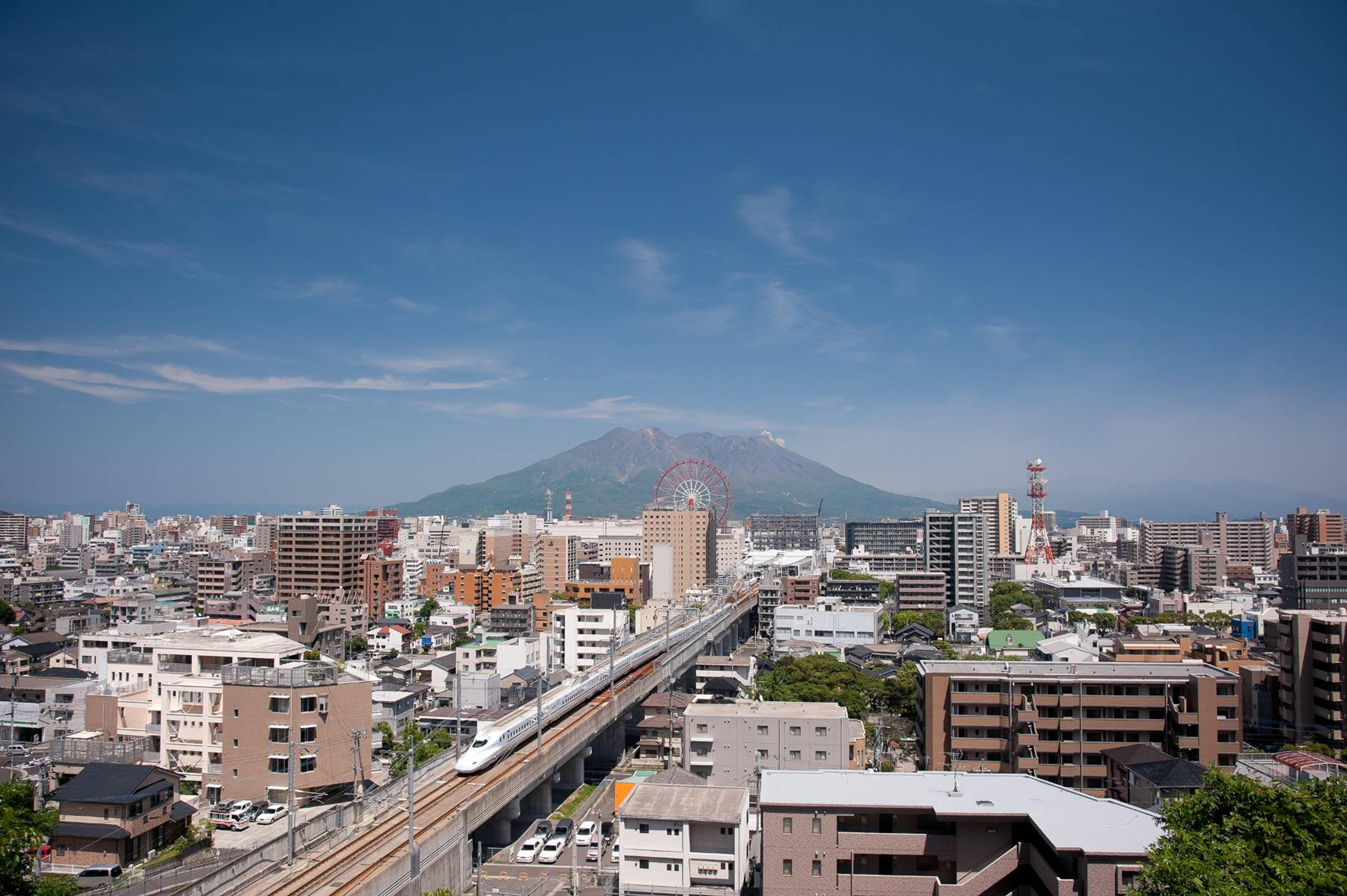
Sakurajima and Kagoshima City

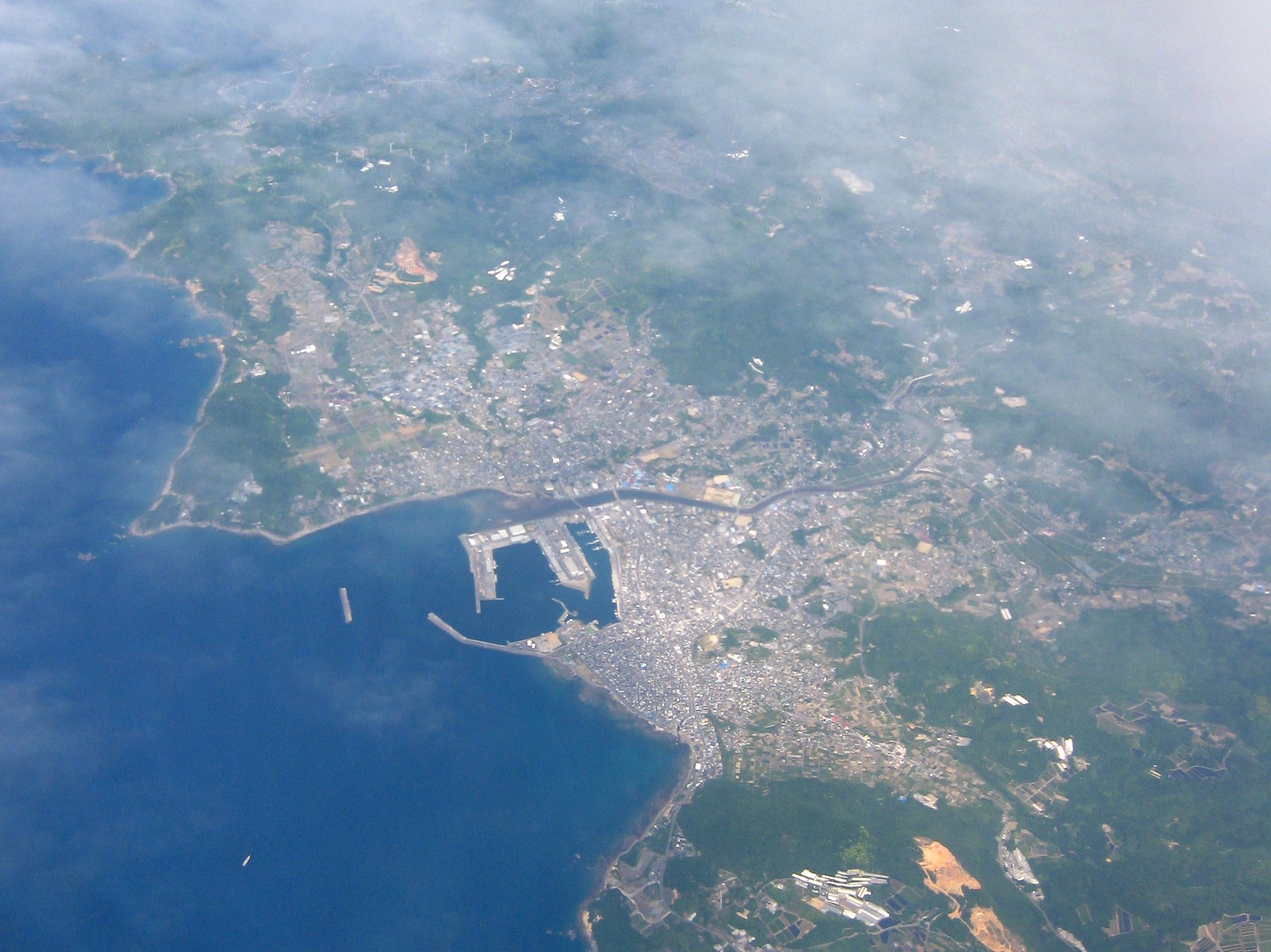
Makurazaki

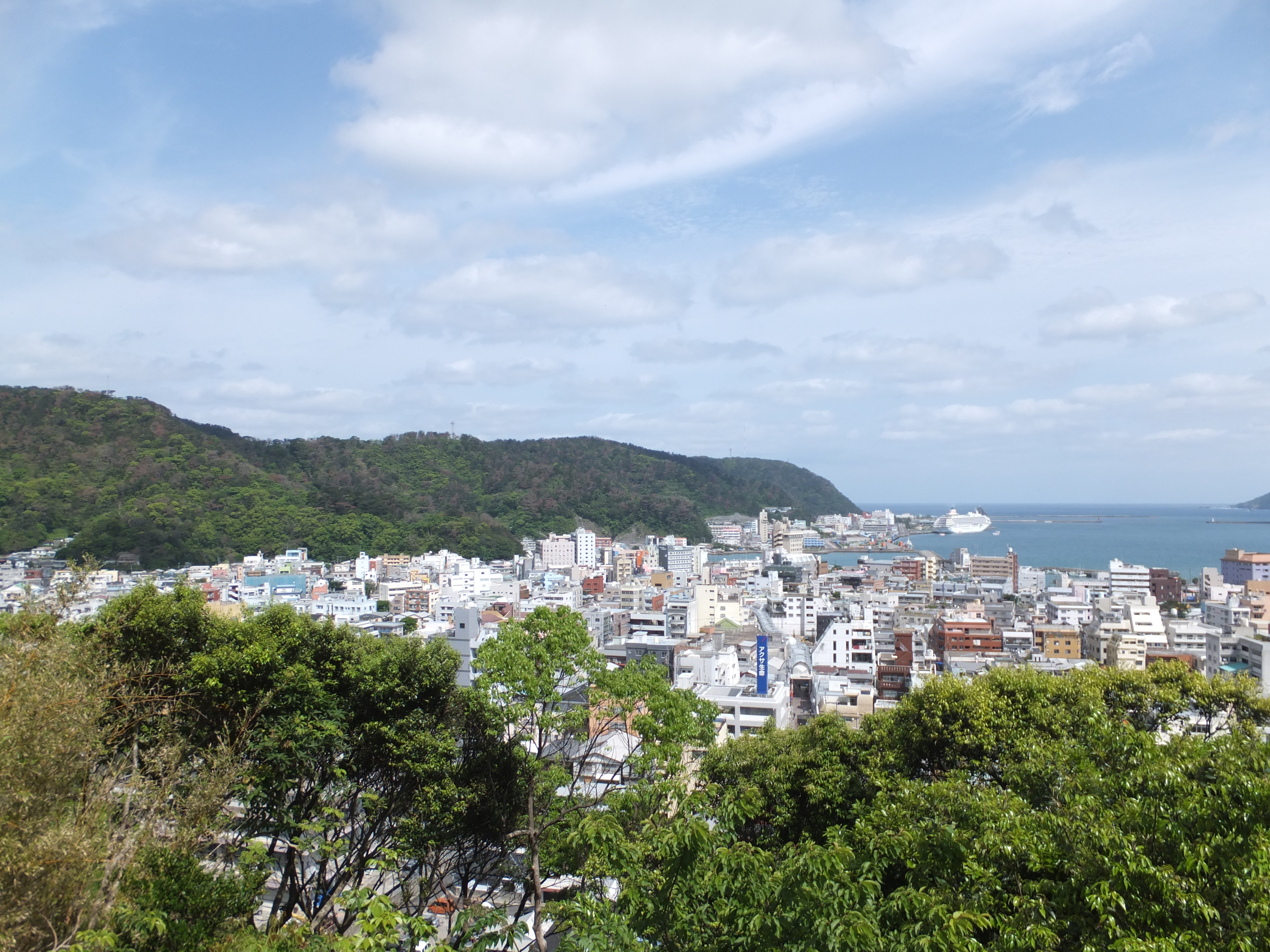
Amami City

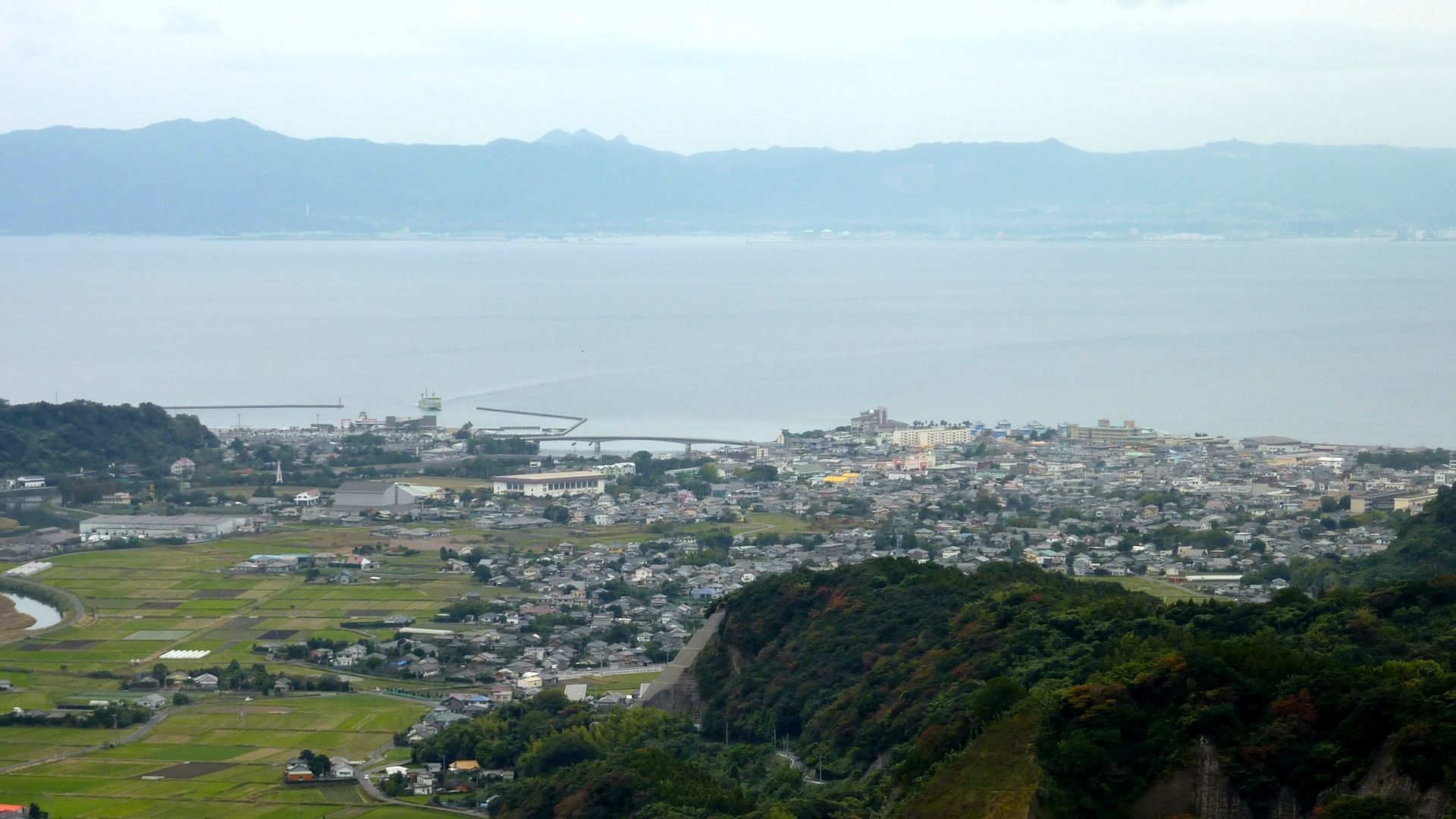
Tarumizu

Nineteen cities are located in Kagoshima Prefecture:

Name		Area (km^{2})	Population	Map
Rōmaji	Kanji	Area (km^{2})	Population	Map
Aira	姶良市	231.32	75,665	
Akune	阿久根市	134.3	23,887	
Amami	奄美市	308.15	42,718	
Hioki	日置市	253.06	51,819	
Ibusuki	指宿市	149.01	43,931	
Ichikikushikino	いちき串木野市	112.04	30,551	
Isa	伊佐市	392.36	30,070	
Izumi	出水市	330.06	56,205	
Kagoshima (capital)	鹿児島市	547.58	595,049	
Kanoya	鹿屋市	448.33	104,148	
Kirishima	霧島市	603.18	124,763	
Makurazaki	枕崎市	74.88	21,960	
Minamikyūshū	南九州市	357.85	39,738	
Minamisatsuma	南さつま市	283.3	39,012	
Nishinoomote	西之表市	205.75	16,418	
Satsumasendai	薩摩川内市	683.5	96,411	
Shibushi	志布志市	209.01	33,724	
Soo	曽於市	390.39	37,038	
Tarumizu	垂水市	161.86	14,847	

=== Districts ===
These are the towns and villages in each district:

Name		Area (km^{2})	Population	District [subprefecture (if any)]	Type	Map
Rōmaji	Kanji	Area (km^{2})	Population	District [subprefecture (if any)]	Type	Map
Amagi	天城町	80.35	6,350	Ōshima District [Ōshima Subprefecture]	Town	
China	知名町	53.29	5,976	Ōshima District [Ōshima Subprefecture]	Town	
Higashikushira	東串良町	27.69	7,122	Kimotsuki District	Town	
Isen	伊仙町	62.7	6,594	Ōshima District [Ōshima Subprefecture]	Town	
Kikai	喜界町	56.94	7,657	Ōshima District [Ōshima Subprefecture]	Town	
Kimotsuki	肝付町	308.12	15,169	Kimotsuki District	Town	
Kinkō	錦江町	163.15	9,328	Kimotsuki District	Town	
Minamiōsumi	南大隅町	213.59	7,646	Kimotsuki District	Town	
Minamitane	南種子町	110.4	5,925	Kumage District [Kumage Subprefecture]	Town	
Mishima	三島村	31.36	383	Kagoshima District	Village	
Nagashima	長島町	116.13	10,124	Izumi District	Town	
Nakatane	中種子町	137.78	8,439	Kumage District [Kumage Subprefecture]	Town	
Ōsaki	大崎町	100.82	13,488	Soo District	Town	
Satsuma	さつま町	303.43	23,842	Satsuma District	Town	
Setouchi	瀬戸内町	239.92	9,379	Ōshima District [Ōshima Subprefecture]	Town	
Tatsugō	龍郷町	82.08	5,992	Ōshima District [Ōshima Subprefecture]	Town	
Tokunoshima	徳之島町	104.87	11,673	Ōshima District [Ōshima Subprefecture]	Town	
Toshima	十島村	101.35	688	Kagoshima District	Village	
Uken	宇検村	103.07	1,843	Ōshima District [Ōshima Subprefecture]	Village	
Wadomari	和泊町	40.37	6,929	Ōshima District [Ōshima Subprefecture]	Town	
Yakushima	屋久島町	540.98	13,486	Kumage District [Kumage Subprefecture]	Town	
Yamato	大和村	88.15	1,638	Ōshima District [Ōshima Subprefecture]	Village	
Yoron	与論町	20.49	5,263	Ōshima District [Ōshima Subprefecture]	Town	
Yūsui	湧水町	144.33	12,220	Aira District	Town	

== Culture ==
=== Food ===
Kagoshima Prefecture has a distinct and rich food culture. The warm weather and diverse environments allow for the agriculture and aquaculture of Kagoshima to thrive. Numerous restaurants around Kagoshima feature Satsuma Province local cuisine. Popular cuisine incorporating local agriculture include sweet potato, kibinago sashimi (silver-striped herring), buri amberjack, kampachi yellowtail, "Black Label Products" such as kuro-ushi Wagyu beef, kuro-buta Berkshire pork dishes, and kuro-Satsuma jidori chicken (sometimes served as raw, chicken sashimi); smoked eel, keihan, and miki (fermented rice milk consumed among residents of the Amami Islands).

==== Satsuma-age ====
Satsuma-age, or deep-fried fish cake, comes in great variety in Kagoshima. Though the deep-fried fishcake can be found throughout the country, the Satsuma Domain (modern-day Kagoshima Prefecture) is commonly believed to be the birthplace of the snack. It is said, though, the concept was introduced from the Ryūkyū Kingdom (modern-day Okinawa Prefecture) by Satsuma Lord, Nariakira Shimazu.

==== Sweets ====
There are many types of sweets produced in Kagoshima Prefecture. Kagoshima-based Seika Foods Co., Ltd. (Seika shokuhin kabushiki-kaisha) has produced some of Japan's most popular and timeless sweets such as hyōroku mochi Bontan Ame (ボンタンアメ), Satsuma Imo Caramel (さつまいもキャラメル), and green tea-flavored Hyōroku mochi, Minami "shirokuma" shaved ice desserts, etc. Traditional treats outside of Seika Food Co., Ltd. products include karukan (sweet cakes made from steamed yams and rice flour), jambo-mochi, kokutō brown sugar from the Amami Islands, getanha brown sugar cake, etc.

==== Beverages ====
In 1559, at Kōriyama Hachiman Shrine (郡山八幡神社) in Isa City (伊佐市) a carpenter wrote atop a wooden board "the Shintō Priest of this shrine is too stingy to offer me Shōchū (焼酎) showing an early love for the spirits. Kagoshima Prefecture is officially recognized (by the World Trade Organization) as the home to one of the most traditional beverages of Japan, shōchū. In Kagoshima there are 113+ distilleries, producing about 1,500 highly acclaimed brands, placing Kagoshima in the top for production quantity and shipment. While visiting Kagoshima, one may notice labels reading Honkaku-shōchū (本格焼酎). Honkaku-shōchū is a distilled beverage produced with traditional skills using ingredients such as natural spring water, sweet potatoes, locally grown sugar cane, and grains. Varieties of honkaku-shōchū include Imo-jōchū (芋焼酎), shōchū distilled from sweet potatoes, Mugi-jōchū (麦焼酎), distilled from barley, and Kome-jōchū (米焼酎) distilled from rice. Another type of shōchū is Kokutō-shōchū (黒糖焼酎), shōchū distilled with brown sugar). Shōchū has long gained international favor and has come to be comparable to Bordeaux for wine, Scotch for whiskey, and Cognac for brandy. Also, the Amami Islands of Kagoshima Prefecture are the only areas sanctioned to bear the label of kokutō-shōchū.

Kurozu (黒酢) or black vinegar is another item of the "Black Label Products" of Kagoshima, the other of which is Kokutō-shōchū. There are a number of kurozu farms around Kagoshima, most of which are located around the Kirishima area. Most kurozu farms produce kurozu bottled vinegar (fermented for a single year, 2+ years) along with other items such as salad dressing, powders, capsules, spices, candy, etc. Kurozu also comes in different flavors such as grape, orange, ume plum, etc. though the most popular flavor by far is apple. The farms are open to visitations and often offer tours.

=== Dialect ===
Today, Kagoshima is home to a distinctive dialect of Japanese known as Satsugū dialect (薩隅方言, Satsugū Hōgen) or Kagoshima dialect (鹿児島弁, Kagoshima-ben; or Kagomma-ben), differing from the usual Kyushu dialects with its pronunciations of the yotsugana.

For the most part, Satsugū dialect is mutually unintelligible with Standard Japanese, though most Satsugū speakers know both as a result of language standardization in Japan.

== Sport and recreation ==
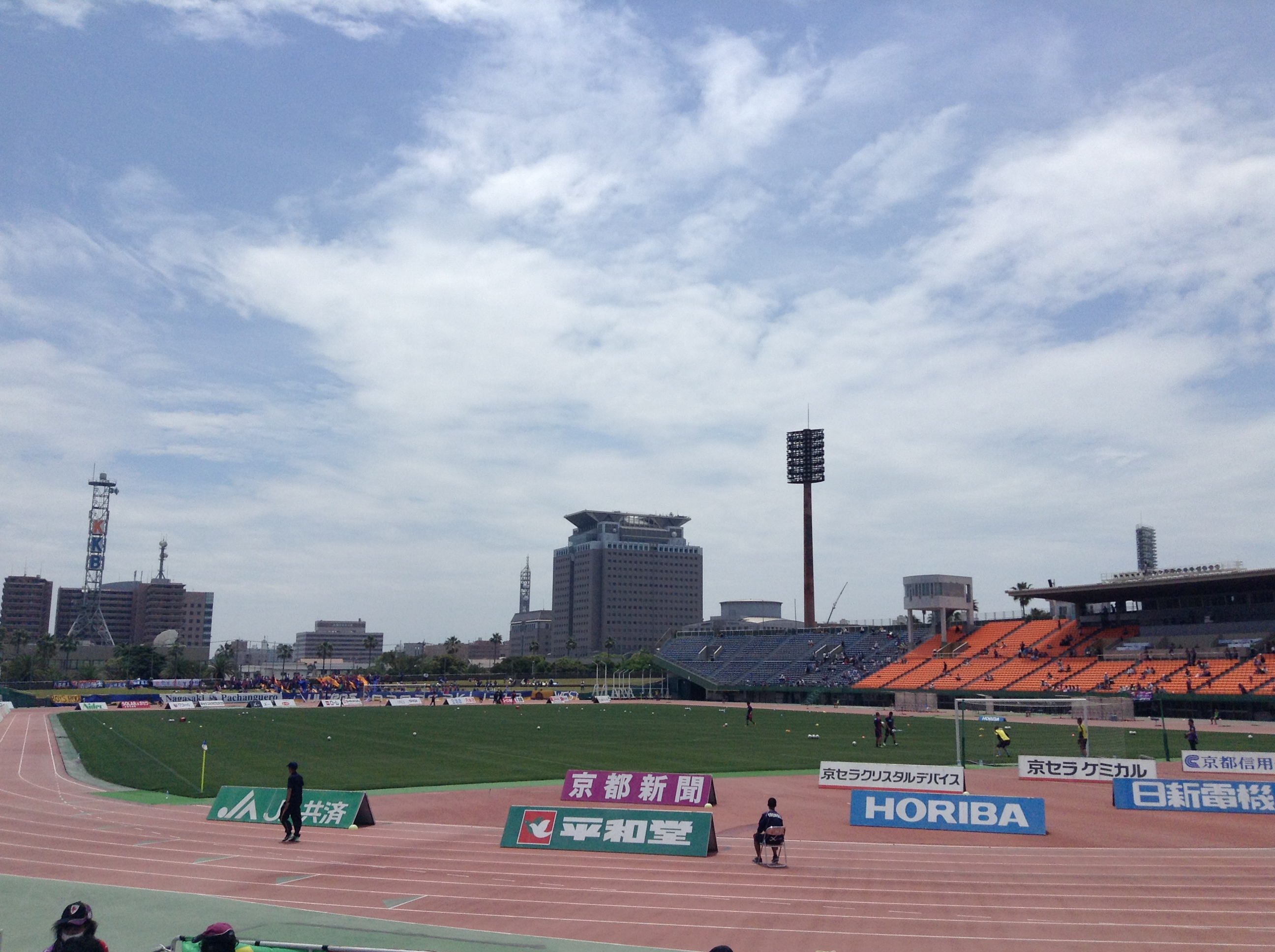
Shiranami Stadium

Kagoshima Rebnise, a professional basketball team, was founded in 2003 and currently competes in the second division of the national B.League. Kagoshima United FC, a football team, was founded in 2014 and competes in the J3 League. Although no major professional baseball teams are based in the prefecture, a number of Kagoshima's ballparks have hosted the spring training camps of Nippon Professional Baseball teams:

- Ibusuki Municipal Ballpark (指宿市営球場), camp home of the Kokutesu Swallows
- Kagoshima Fureai Sportsland, camp home of Sagan Tosu (football)
- Kagoshima Kamoike Stadium, camp home of Júbilo Iwata (football) and Toshiba Brave Lupus (rugby)
- Kamoike Ballpark, previous camp home of the Chiba Lotte Marines (NPB) and Lotte Giants (KBO League). Also hosts regular season games.
- Kamoike Citizen Stadium
- Yunomoto Ballpark (湯之元球場), camp home of the Yakult Atoms

The Kirishima-Yaku National Park is located in Kagoshima Prefecture.

== Education ==
=== Universities and colleges ===
- Daiichi Institute of Technology
- Daiichi Junior College of Infant Education
- The International University of Kagoshima
- Kagoshima Immaculate Heart College
- Kagoshima Immaculate Heart University
- Kagoshima Prefectural College
- Kagoshima University
- Kagoshima Women's Junior College
- National Institute of Fitness and Sports in Kanoya
- Shigakukan University

== Science and technology facilities ==
- Tanegashima Space Center
- Uchinoura Space Center

== Museums ==
- Bansei Tokkō Peace Museum
- Chiran Peace Museum for Kamikaze Pilots
- Museum of the Meiji Restoration
- Reimeikan, Kagoshima Prefectural Center for Historical Material
- Uenohara site

== Transportation ==
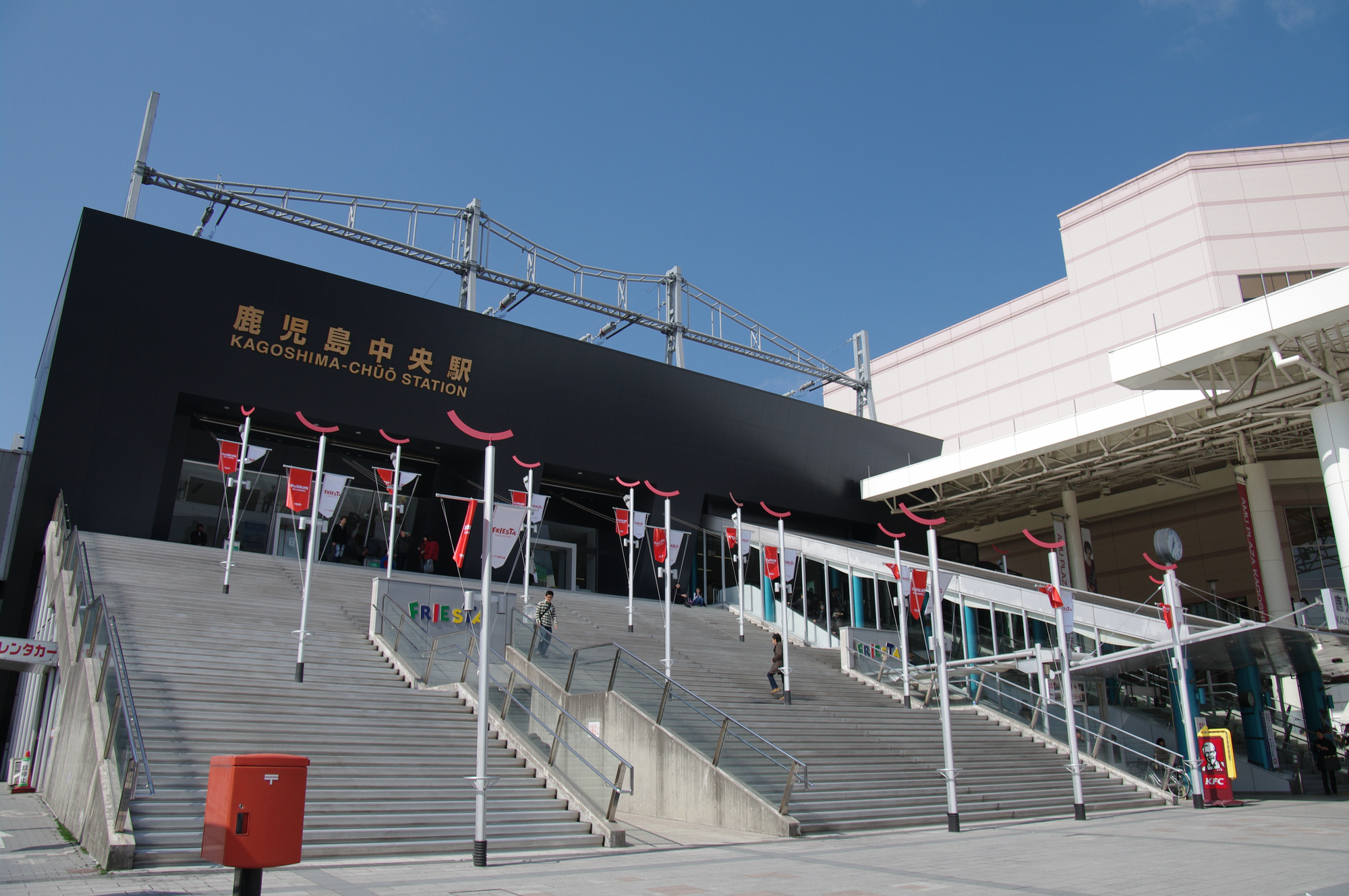
Kagoshima-Chuo Station

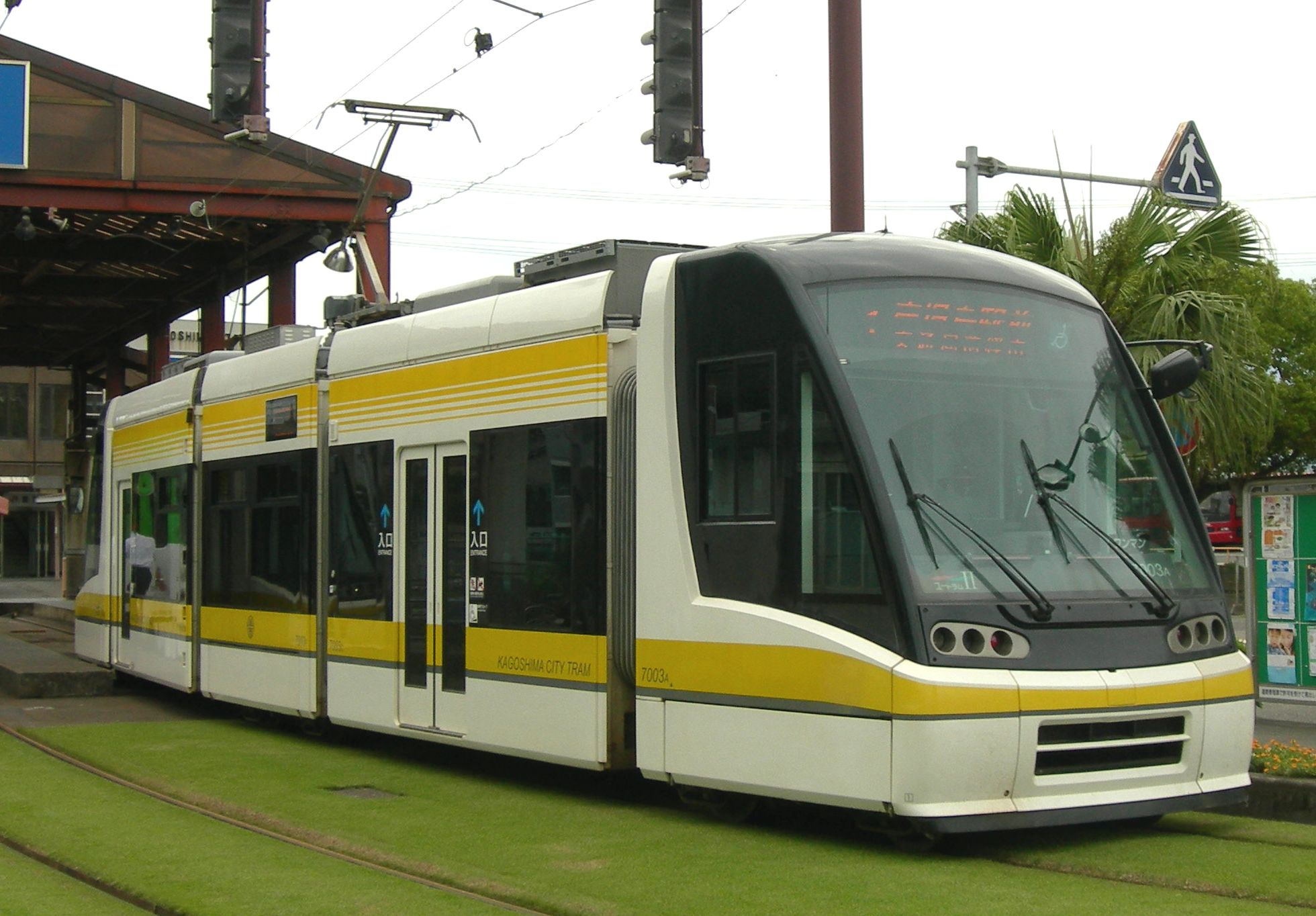
Kagoshima City Tram

=== Rail ===
- Hisatsu Orange Railway
- JR Kyushu
  - Ibusuki Makurazaki Line
  - Hisatsu Line
  - Kagoshima Line
  - Kitto Line
  - Kyushu Shinkansen
  - Nippō Main Line

=== Trams ===
- Kagoshima City Tram

=== Roads ===
==== Expressways and toll roads ====
- Higashikyushu Expressway (Hayato Road)
- Ibusuki Toll Road
- Kyushu Expressway
- Minamikyushu Expressway
- Miyazaki Expressway

==== National highways ====
- National Route 3 (Kitakyushu–Fukuoka–Kurume–Kumamoto–Minamata-Izumi-Satsuma Sendai-Kagoshima)
- National Route 10 (Kitakyushu-Nakatsu–Beppu–Saiki–Nobeoka–Miyazaki–Miyakonojo-Kagoshima)
- National Route 58 (disconnected segments in downtown Kagoshima and on the islands of Tanegashima and Amami Ōshima)
- Route 220 (Miyazaki-Nichinan-Shibushi-Kanoya-Tarumizu-Kirishima)
- Route 223
- Route 224
- Route 225
- Route 226
- Route 267 (Hitoyoshi-Isa-Satsuma Sendai)
- Route 268 (Minamata-Isa-Ebino–Kobayashi-Miyazaki)
- Route 269
- Route 270
- Route 328 (Kagoshima-Isa-Izumi)
- Route 389 (Ōmuta–Tamana–Unzen–Minamishimabara–Amakusa-Akune)
- Route 447 (Ebino-Isa-Izumi)
- Route 448
- Route 499
- Route 504 (Kanoya-Kirishima-Satsuma-Izumi)

=== Ports ===
- Kagoshima Port
  - Domestic ferry route to Sakurajima, Kikai Island, Tokunoshima, Amami Island, Tanegashima, Yakushima, Yoron Island, Okinoerabu and Naha.
  - High-speed craft route to Ibusuki, Tanegashima and Yakushima.
  - International container hub port
- Naze Port
  - Ferry Route to Osaka, Kobe, Kagoshima, Yakushima, Tanegashima, Tokunoshima and Naha.
- Shibushi Port
  - Ferry route to Osaka, Tokyo, Naha and Amami Island
  - International and domestic container hub port
- Tanegashima Port
- Tokunoshima Port
- Yakushima Port

=== Airports ===
- Amami Airport
- Kagoshima Airport
- Okinoerabu Airport
- Tanegashima Airport
- Tokunoshima Airport
- Yakushima Airport
- Yoron Airport

== Notable people ==
- Isamu Akasaki, physicist and engineer, Nobel Prize in Physics laureate
- Hajime Chitose, singer
- Hayato Tani, actor
- Yasuhito Endo, football player
- Kosuke Fukudome, MLB player
- GO!GO!7188, rock band
- Masazumi Harada, doctor
- Goyō Hashiguchi, artist
- Utami Hayashishita, professional wrestler
- Tōgō Heihachirō, admiral of the fleet in the Imperial Japanese Navy
- Kota Ibushi, professional Wrestler
- Kazuo Inamori, industrialist turned philanthropist
- Junichi Inamoto, football player
- Takehiko Inoue, modern comic artist
- Shinobu Kaitani, modern comic artist
- Yuki Kashiwagi, AKB48 member
- Kunio Kato animator known especially for La Maison en Petits Cubes
- Yoichiro Kawaguchi, computer graphics artist
- Munenori Kawasaki, MLB player
- Kohei Miyauchi, voice actor
- Sakura Miyawaki, HKT48, Iz*One and LE SSERAFIM member
- Mika Nakashima, artist
- Shimazu Nariakira, feudal lord
- Yuya Osako, football player
- Robico, manga artist
- Jirō Sakagami, comedian
- Hiroyuki Sakai, Iron Chef cook
- Hitoshi Sakimoto, composer
- Nanami Sakuraba, actress
- Tokichi Setoguchi, composer
- Yoku Shioya, voice actor
- Kawasaki Shōzō, founder of Kawasaki Heavy Industries
- Kento Tachibanada, football player
- Nabi Tajima, supercentenarian and the oldest living person in the world from September 2017-April 2018
- Saigō Takamori, samurai
- Seiji Tōgō, artist
- Ōkubo Toshimichi, statesman
- Yoshiyuki Tsuruta, swimmer, Olympic Games double gold medalist
- Wowaka, singer

== Mythical creatures ==
- Garappa (Kappa)
- Issie
- Ittan-momen

== International relations ==
- Georgia, United States, since November 28, 1966
- (Japan) Gifu Prefecture, since July 27, 1971
- Jeollabuk-do, South Korea, since October 1989, duo-declaration
- Jiangsu, China

== See also ==
- 2006 Kuril Islands earthquake
- Amami language, Kunigami language
- Kagoshima dialect
- Sakurajima radish
