= Takakuma =

Takakuma may refer to:

- Mount Takakuma in Kameoka, Kyoto Prefecture, Japan
- Takakuma Dam in Kagoshima Prefecture, Japan
- Takakumayama Prefectural Natural Park in Kagoshima Prefecture, Japan
