= Kumage Subprefecture =

Coordinates: 30°44′03″N 130°59′45″E

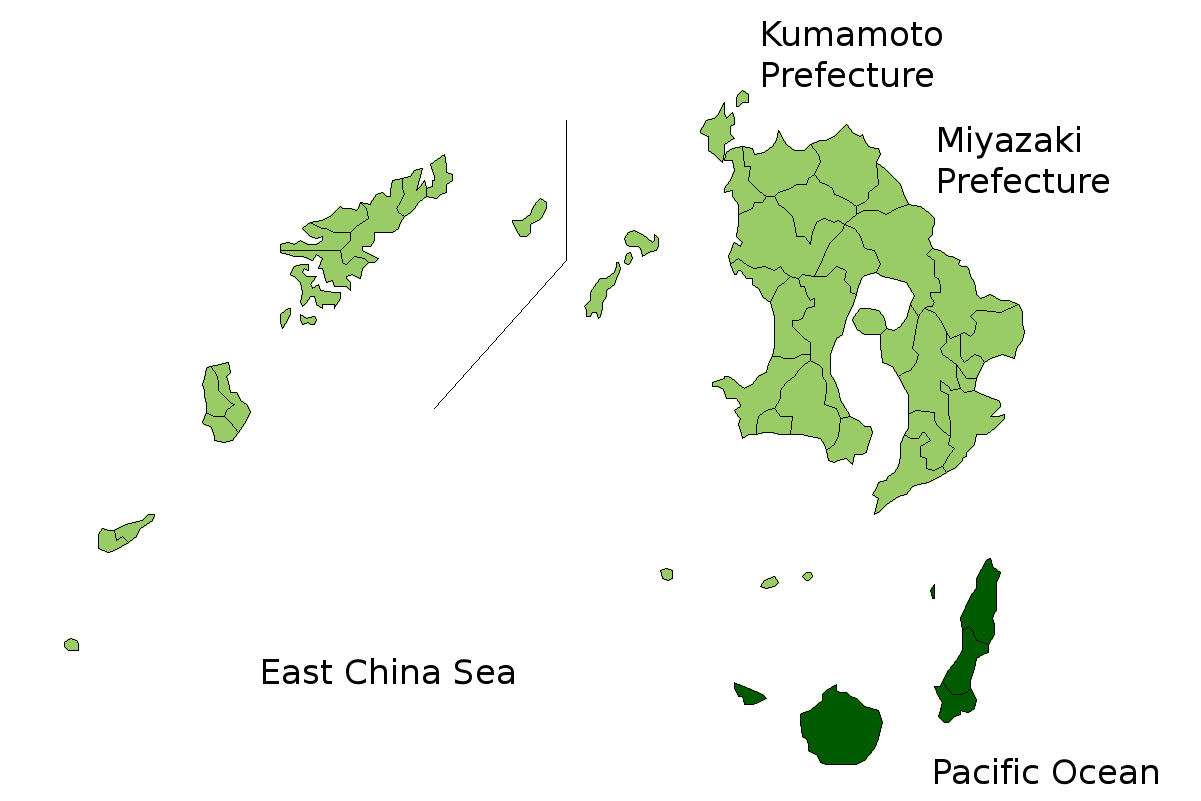
Kumage Subprefecture's location in Kagoshima Prefecture

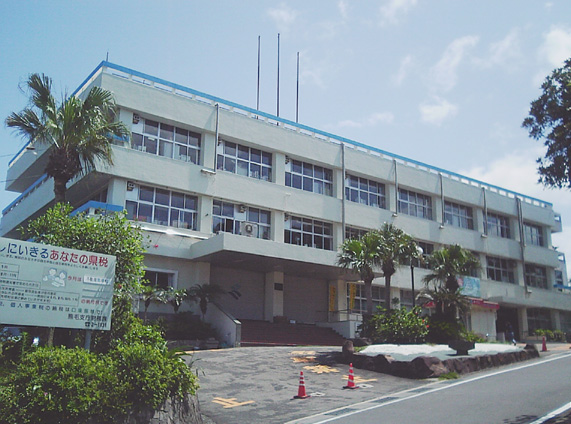
Subprefectural Government office, Nishinoomote

Kumage Subprefecture (熊毛支庁, Kumage-shichō) is a subprefecture of Kagoshima Prefecture, Japan. The subprefectural office is located in Nishinoomote.

It includes the following cities and towns on the Ōsumi Islands:

- Kumage Subprefecture
  - Nishinoomote (city on Tanegashima and Mageshima)
  - Nakatane (town on Tanegashima)
  - Minamitane (town on Tanegashima)
- Yakushima Office
  - Yakushima (town on Yakushima and Kuchinoerabujima)

== History ==
- 1889: These area, formerly governed by Ōshima Subprefecture, were succeeded by Kumage and Gomu District Governments.
- 1897: Gomu District was merged into Kumage District.
- 1926: Kumage Subprefecture was founded on the corresponding area.

== Offices ==
- Kumage Subprefecture: 7590 Nishinoomote, Nishinoomote-shi, Kagoshime-ken. 891-3192
- Kumage Subprefecture Yakushima Office: 650 Anbō, Yakushima-machi, Kumage-gun, Kagoshime-ken. 891-4311
- Kumage Educational Office: 7590 Nishinoomote, Nishinoomote-shi, Kagoshime-ken. 891-3192
