= Fukiagehama Prefectural Natural Park =

Prefectural Natural Park in Japan

- 吹上浜県立自然公園
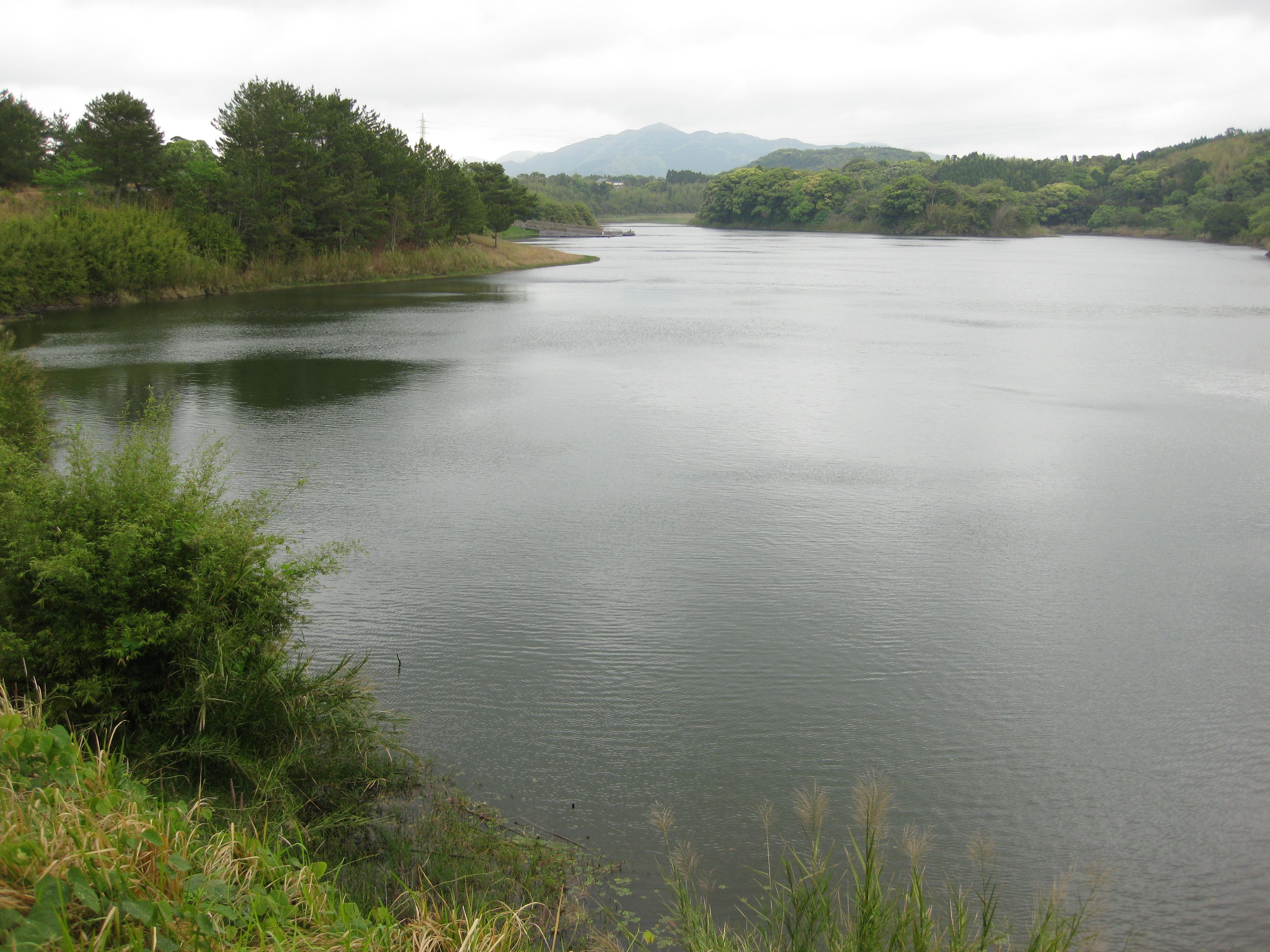
- Lake Satsuma

- Location within Kagoshima Prefecture Location within Japan
- Location: Kagoshima Prefecture, Japan
- Coordinates: 31.67°N 130.3°E
- Area: 32.14 km^{2} (12.41 sq mi)
- Established: 31 March 1953

Fukiagehama Prefectural Natural Park (吹上浜県立自然公園, Fukiagehama kenritsu shizen kōen) is a Prefectural Natural Park in western Kagoshima Prefecture, Japan. Established in 1953, the park spans the municipalities of Hioki, Ichikikushikino, and Minamisatsuma.

== See also ==
- National Parks of Japan
