= Sendaigawa Ryūiki Prefectural Natural Park =

Park in Japan

Coordinates: 32°N 130.5°E

- 川内川流域県立自然公園
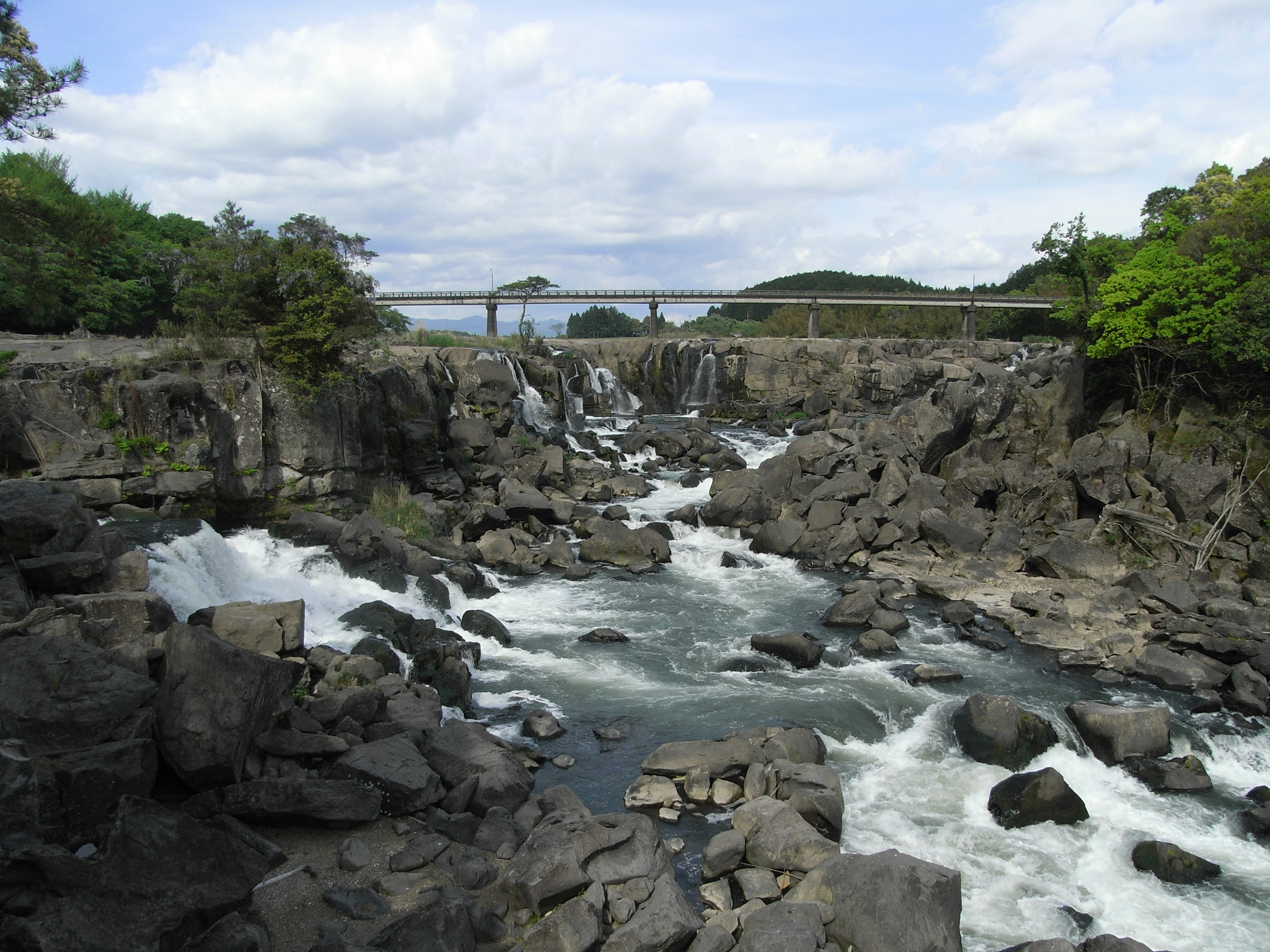
- Sogi Falls
- Interactive map of Sendaigawa Ryūiki Prefectural Natural Park
- Location: Kagoshima Prefecture, Japan
- Area: 65.71 km^{2} (25.37 sq mi)
- Established: 1 April 1964

Sendaigawa Ryūiki Prefectural Natural Park (川内川流域県立自然公園, Sendaigawa Ryūiki kenritsu shizen kōen) is a Prefectural Natural Park in northern Kagoshima Prefecture, Japan. Established in 1964, the park spans the municipalities of Isa, Izumi, Satsuma, and Satsumasendai.

== See also ==
- National Parks of Japan
