= Tokara Rettō Prefectural Natural Park =

National park in Kagoshima Prefecture, Japan

Tokara Islands Prefectural Nature Park
- トカラ列島県立自然公園
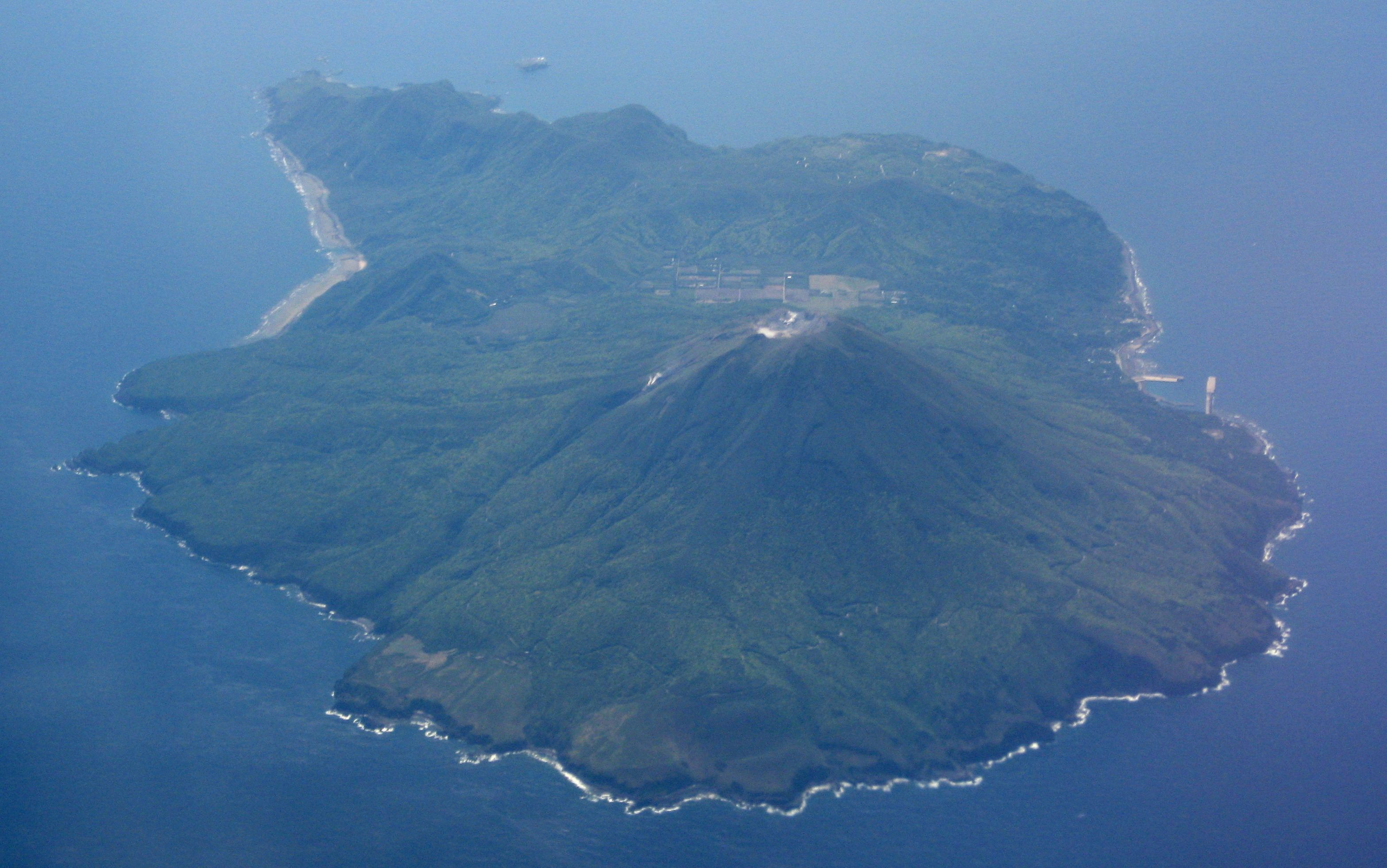
- Nakanoshima in the Tokara Islands
- Interactive map of Tokara Islands Prefectural Nature Park
- Location: Kagoshima Prefecture, Japan
- Area: 46.19 km^{2} (17.83 sq mi)
- Established: 1 April 1992

Tokara Islands Prefectural Nature Park (トカラ列島県立自然公園, Tokara Retto kenritsu shizen kōen) is a Prefectural Nature Park to the south of mainland Kyūshū, in Kagoshima Prefecture, Japan. Established in 1992, the park is within the municipality of Toshima.

== See also ==
- National Parks of Japan
