= Flag of Kagoshima Prefecture =

Japanese prefectural flag

Kagoshima Prefecture

The flag of Kagoshima Prefecture (Japanese: 鹿児島県旗, Hepburn: Kagoshima-ken ki) is a white field charged in the center with a stylized black and red silhouette of the prefecture's topography. The black portion, which resembles an inverted horseshoe, represents the Satsuma and Ōsumi Peninsulas, with a small dent on the right corresponding to Shibushi Bay. Within the black shape is a red circle representing Sakurajima, Japan's most active volcano. Some locals have criticised the flag for not depicting Kagoshima Prefecture's islands to the west and southwest of Kyushu.

== Emblem ==
Public notice announcing the emblem's adoption

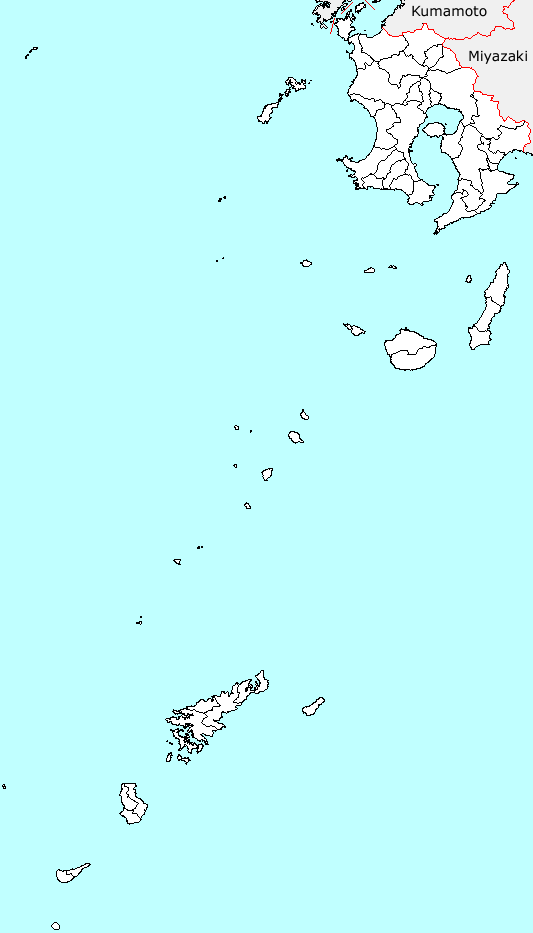
Map of Kagoshima Prefecture

The flag's charge is the emblem of Kagoshima Prefecture (鹿児島県章, Kagoshima-ken shō), which was adopted on 10 March 1967 following a public competition. Like other prefectural emblems, it was created to foster a sense of prefectural identity. Symbolically, it represents the prefecture's growth and "the passion, harmony, and unity of its people."

The emblem consists of a black inverted horseshoe shape enclosing a smaller red circle. The black shape represents the Satsuma and Ōsumi Peninsulas, while the red circle represents Sakurajima – a stratovolcano (Japan's most active volcano), peninsula, and former island. The dent on the right side of the black shape represents Shibushi Bay. Although the emblem is meant to represent the topography of Kagoshima Prefecture, it does not depict any of the prefecture's islands to the west and southwest of Kyushu. The omission has been criticized by some locals, including folklorist Toshimi Shimono, who regarded it as an example of historical discrimination and neglect toward the islands.

== Prefectural symbol and alternate flag ==
The Kagoshima prefectural government adopted a prefectural symbol (シンボルマーク; lit. 'symbol mark') on 16 March 1994. It is a stylized blue letter "K", with the top and bottom curves symbolizing winds and waves, respectively. The imagery is meant to express the dynamicity and progress of the prefecture.

In the late 1990s, some members of the Kagoshima Prefectural Assembly proposed replacing the prefectural emblem with the prefectural symbol and updating the prefectural flag accordingly. However, the prefectural government ultimately did not pursue the proposal because some residents of the prefecture had become attached to the emblem.

Japanese astronaut Koichi Wakata carried a flag bearing the symbol onto Space Shuttle Discovery in 2009.

Symbol of Kagoshima Prefecture

Flag bearing the prefectural symbol

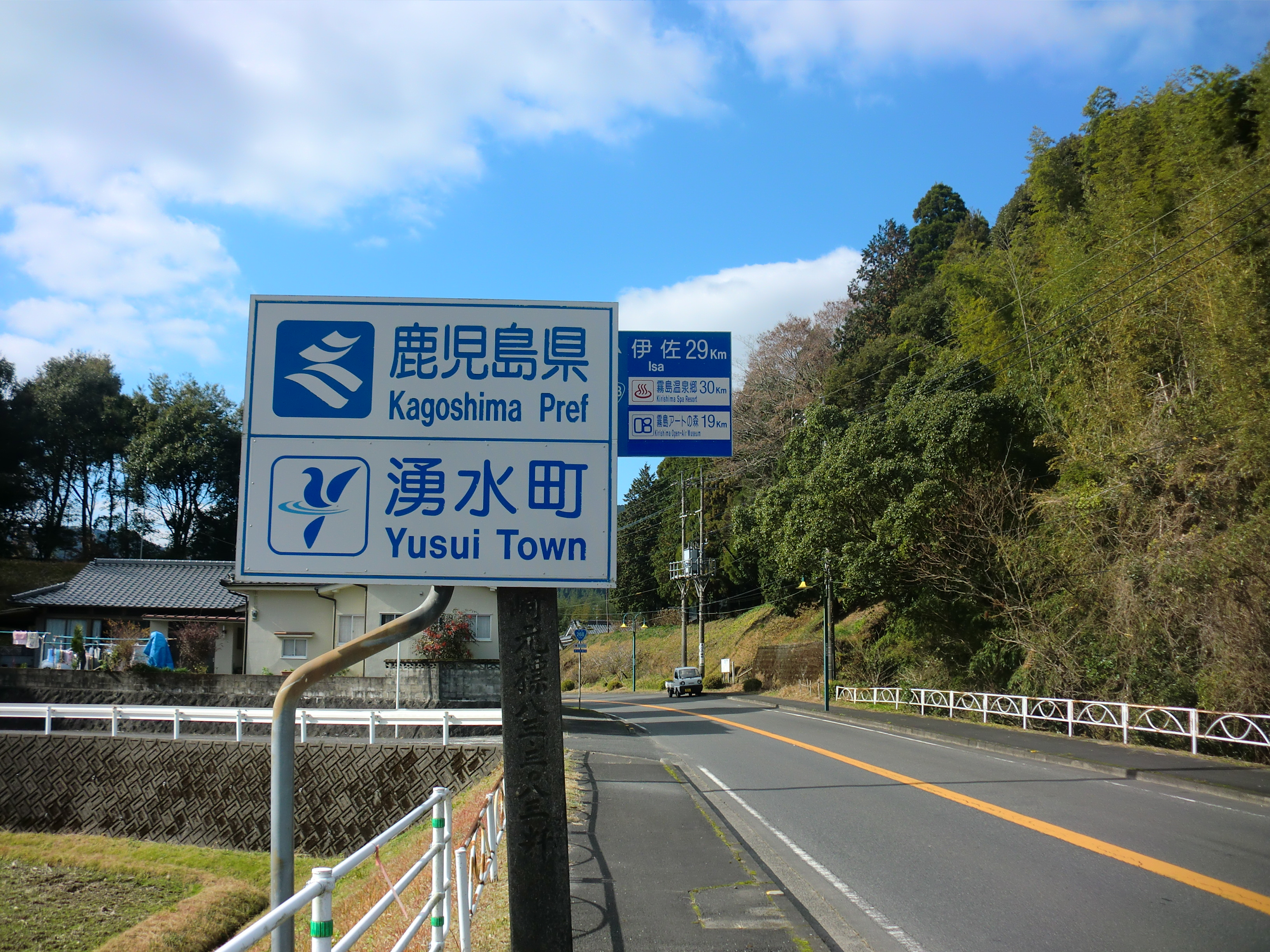
The prefectural symbol on a sign at the border with Miyazaki Prefecture
