= Akune Prefectural Natural Park =

Natural park in Kagoshima prefecture, Japan

- 阿久根県立自然公園
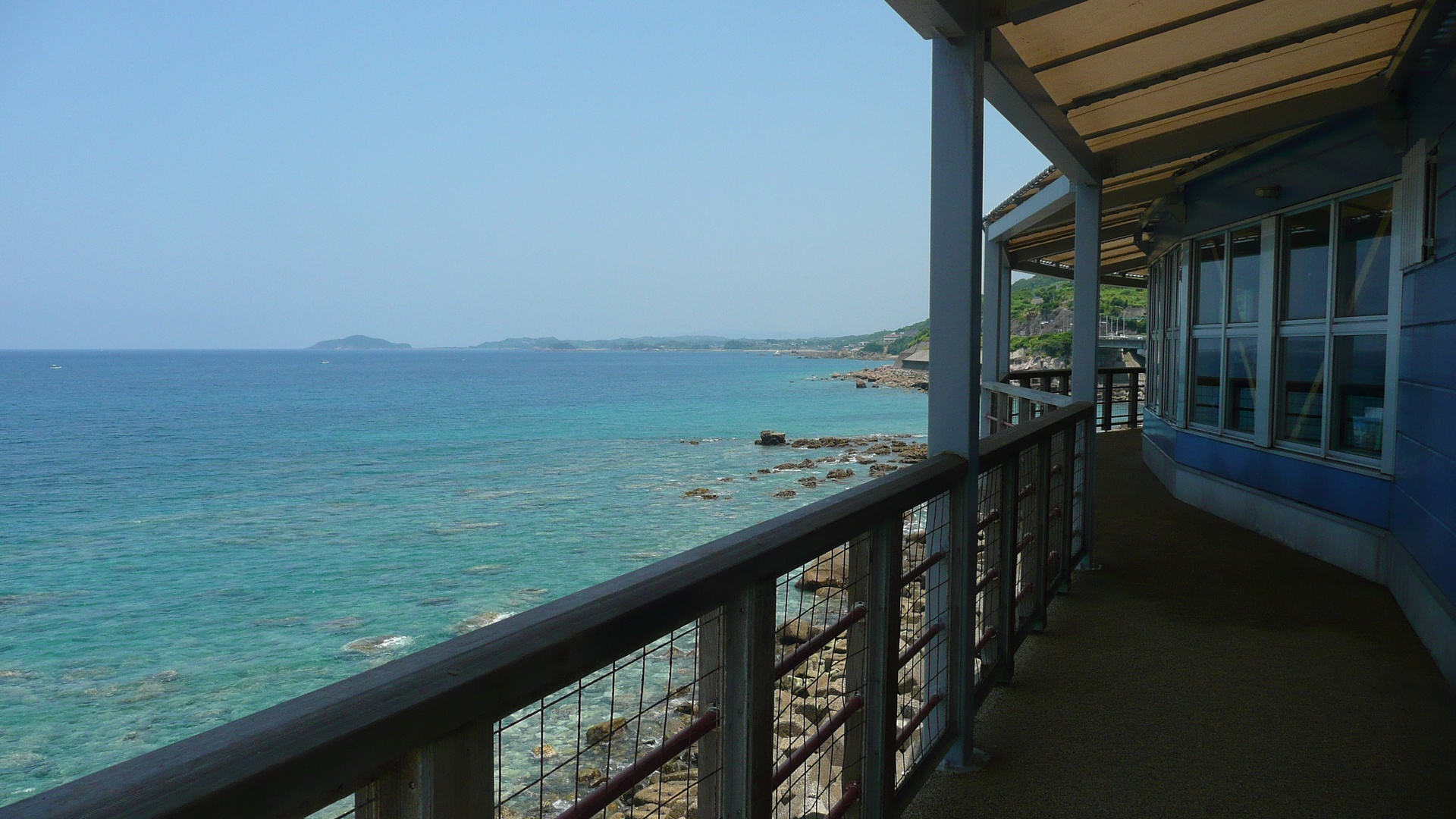
- View of the East China Sea from Akune

- Location within Japan Location within Kagoshima Prefecture
- Location: Kagoshima Prefecture, Japan
- Coordinates: 32.025°N 130.1708°E
- Area: 7.55 km^{2} (2.92 sq mi)
- Established: 31 March 1953

Akune Prefectural Natural Park (阿久根県立自然公園, Akune kenritsu shizen kōen) is a Prefectural Natural Park in northwest Kagoshima Prefecture, Japan. Established in 1953, the park is within the municipality of Akune.

== See also ==
- National Parks of Japan
