= Ōshima Subprefecture (Kagoshima) =

Subprefecture of Kagoshima Prefecture, Japan

Coordinates: 28°22′32″N 129°29′38″E

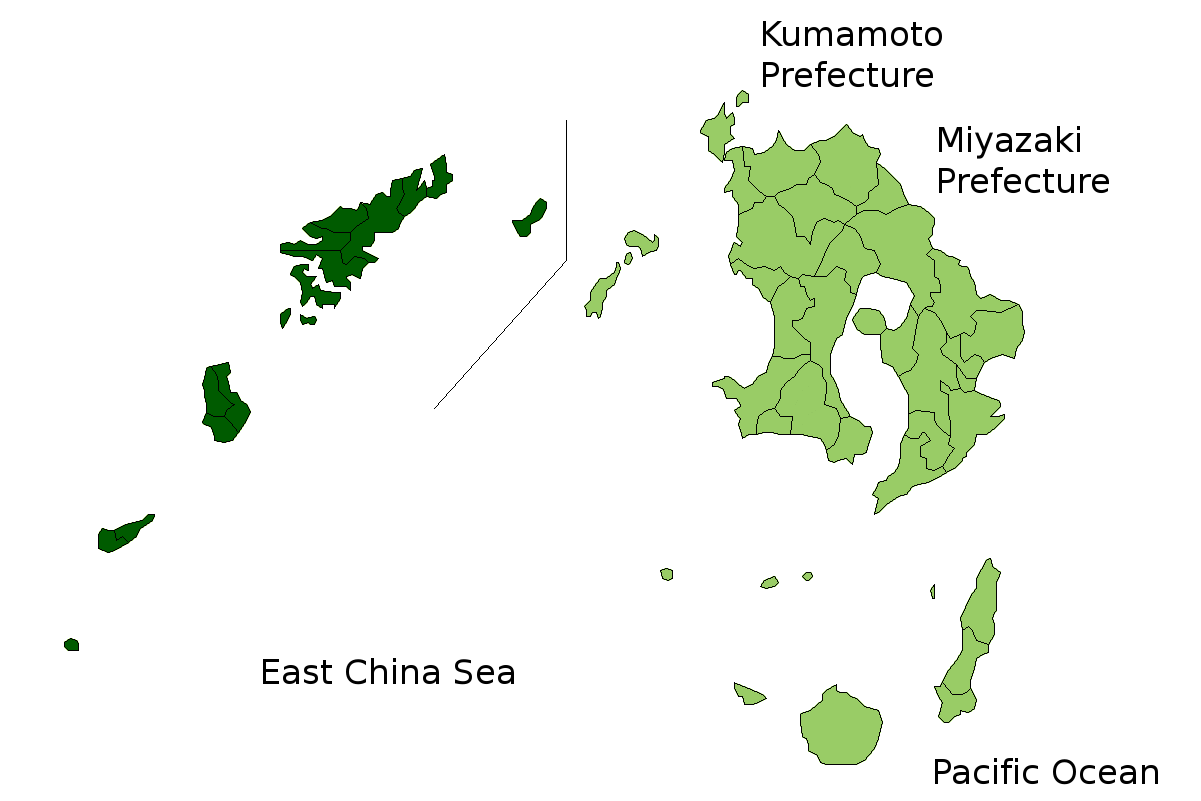
Ōshima Subprefecture's location in Kagoshima Prefecture

Ōshima Subprefecture (大島支庁, Ōshima-shichō) is a subprefecture of Kagoshima Prefecture, Japan. The subprefectural office is located in Amami.

It includes the following municipalities on the Amami Islands:

- Ōshima Subprefecture
  - Amami (city on Amami Ōshima)
  - Tatsugō (town on Amami Ōshima)
  - Yamato (village on Amami Ōshima)
- Setouchi Office
  - Uken (village on Amami Ōshima)
  - Setouchi (town on Amami Ōshima, Kakeromajima, Yoroshima, Ukejima, and others)
- Kikai Office
  - Kikai (town on Kikaijima)
- Tokunoshima Office
  - Tokunoshima (town on Tokunoshima)
  - Amagi (town on Tokunoshima)
  - Isen (town on Tokunoshima)
- Okinoerabu Office
  - Wadomari (town on Okinoerabujima)
  - China (town on Okinoerabujima)
  - Yoron (town on Yoronjima)

== Offices ==
- Ōshima Subprefecture: 17-3 Naze Nagatachō, Amami-shi, Kagoshima-ken. 894-8501
- Setouchi Office: 36 Koniya Funatsu, Setouchi-chō, Kagoshima-ken. 894-1506
- Kikai Office: 2901-14 Akaren, Kikai-chō, Kagoshima-ken. 891-6201
- Tokunoshima Office: 216 Kametsu, Tokunoshima-chō, Kagoshima-ken. 891-7101
- Okinoerabu Office: 134-1 Tedechina, Wadomari-chō, Kagoshima-ken. 891-9111
- Okinoerabu Office Yoron Town Resident Office: 1420-2 Chabana, Yoron-chō, Kagoshima-ken. 891-9301
