= Takakumayama Prefectural Natural Park =

Natural park in Kagoshima prefecture, Japan

Takakumayama Prefectural Nature Park
- 高隈山県立自然公園
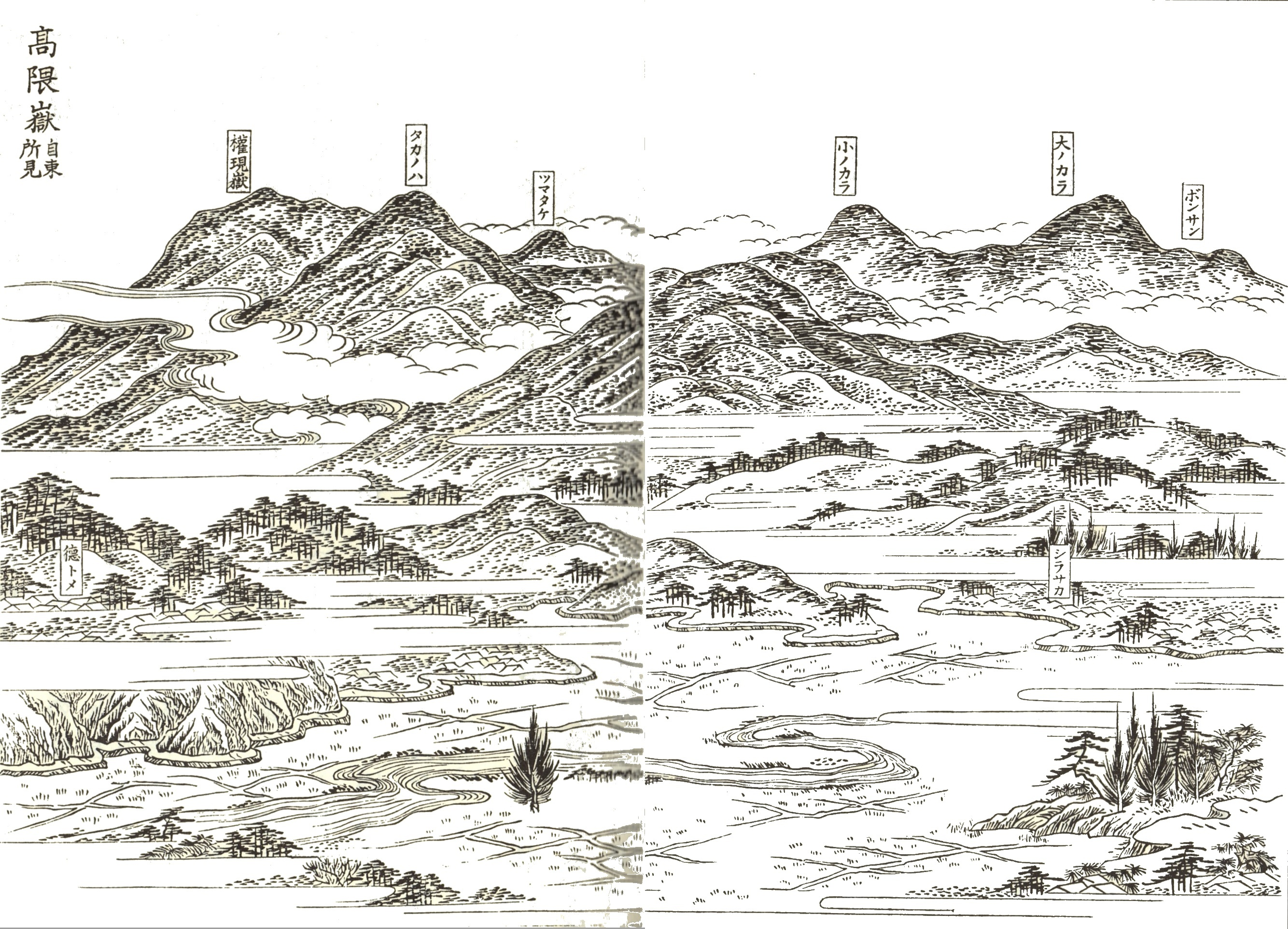
- Takakuma Mountains (Sangoku Meishō Zue)
- Interactive map of Takakumayama Prefectural Nature Park
- Location: Kagoshima Prefecture, Japan
- Area: 24.66 km^{2} (9.52 sq mi)
- Established: 1 June 1977

Takakumayama Prefectural Nature Park (高隈山県立自然公園, Takakumayama kenritsu shizen kōen) is a Prefectural Nature Park in southeast Kagoshima Prefecture, Japan. Established in 1977, the park spans the municipalities of Kanoya and Tarumizu.

== See also ==
- National Parks of Japan
