= Daiichi Junior College of Infant Education =

Private junior college in Kirishima, Kagoshima, Japan

Coordinates: 31.748171°N 130.768454°E

- 第一幼児教育短期大学
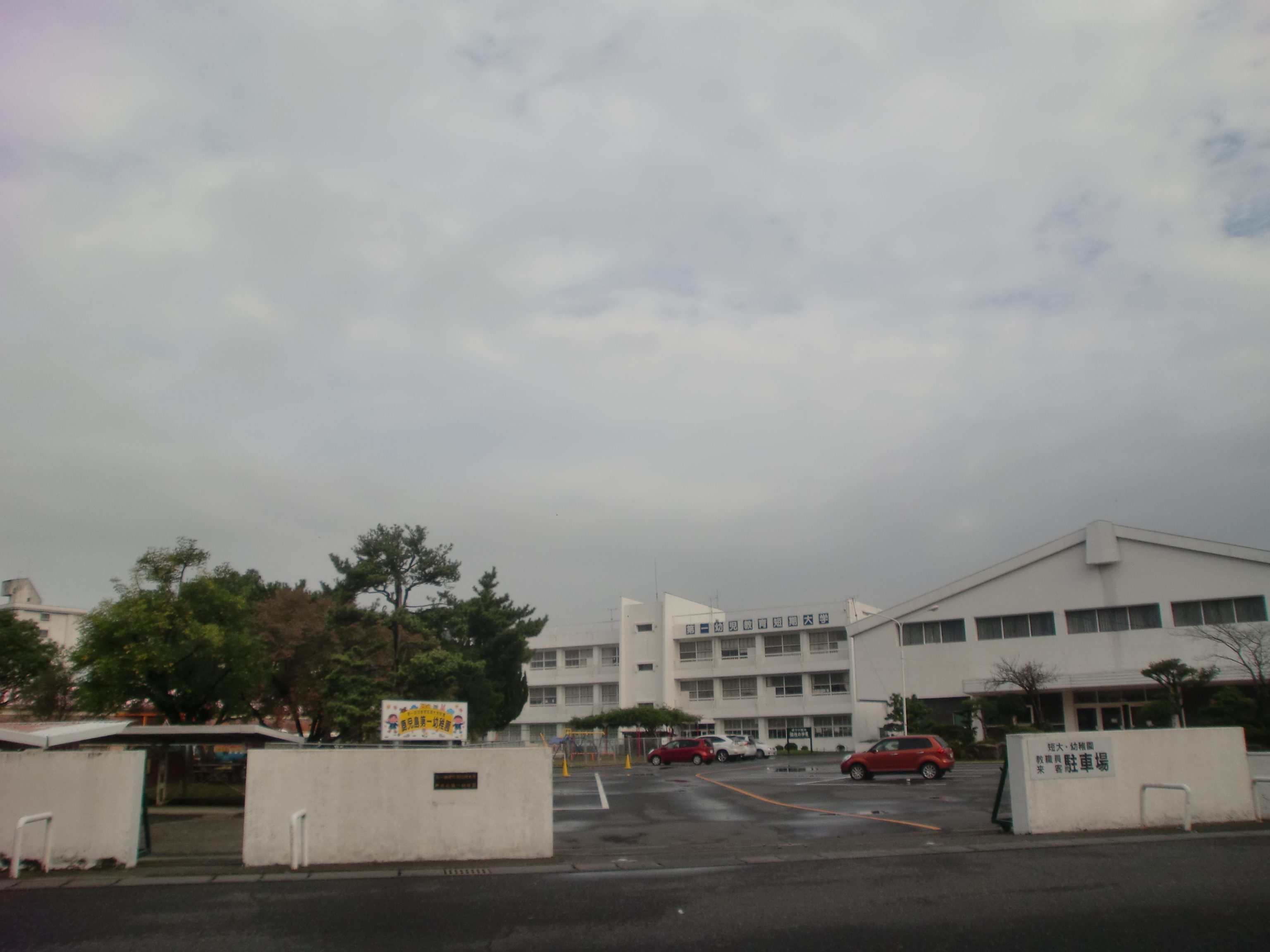
- Daiichi Junior College of Infant Education
- Type: Private junior college
- Established: 1966
- Academic staff: Early childhood education
- Location: Kirishima, Kagoshima, Japan
- Website: jc.tsuzuki-edu.ac.jp

Daiichi Junior College of Infant Education (第一幼児教育短期大学, Daiichi Yōji Kyōiku Tanki Daigaku) is a private junior college in Kirishima, Kagoshima, Japan.

== History ==
The college was established in 1966. It adopted its present name in 1985.

== Courses ==
- Early childhood education
