= List of dams in Kagoshima Prefecture =

The following is a list of dams in Kagoshima Prefecture, Japan.

== List ==
Name	Location	Opened	Height (metres)	Image
Arase Dam		2018	65.6	
Boma Dam		1963	17	
Ichiki Dam			41	
Isenchubu Dam		1987	29	
Jisso Dam		1946	23.3	
Kawanabe Dam		2002	53.5	
Kihoku-damu		2005	41.9	
Kinpo Dam		2003	57.9	
Kiyoura Dam		1974	38.1	
Kougawa Dam			42	
Kushikino Dam		1970	31.7	
Matsumoto Dam		2002	38.5	
Mitarai Dam		1982	43.4	
Nagayoshi Dam		1979	37	
Nakadake Dam		2007	69.9	
Nanbu Dam		1969	25.2	
Nishinotani Dam		2012	21.5	
Odate Dam		1963	53.5	
Okawa Dam		1986	49.2	
Saikyo Dam		1987	29.7	
Seibu Dam		1968	16.7	
Sendaigawa Dam		1964	24	
Shinrei Dam		1981	33.8	
Shinsumiyogawa Dam			25	
Suno Dam		1998	27.5	
Takakuma Dam		1967	47	
Takamatsu Dam		1969	37	
Takanosu Dam		1988	28.9	
Takaono Dam			35	
Take Dam		2003	29.7	
Takeyama Dam		1987	54.5	
Tanikawauchi Dam		2012	58.5	
Tobu Dam		1970	19	
Tokunoshima Dam		2015	56.3	
Tsuruda Dam				
Yamada Dam				
Yamato Dam		2006	45	

== See also ==
- Media related to Dams in Kagoshima prefecture at Wikimedia Commons
