= Kawanabe =

Kawanabe may refer to:

- Kawanabe (surname), a Japanese surname
- Kawanabe Dam, dam in Kagoshima Prefecture
- Kawanabe District, Kagoshima, a former district in Kagoshima Prefecture, Japan
- Kawanabe, Kagoshima, a former town in Kawanabe District
