= Kanoya =

Kanoya 鹿屋市
- City
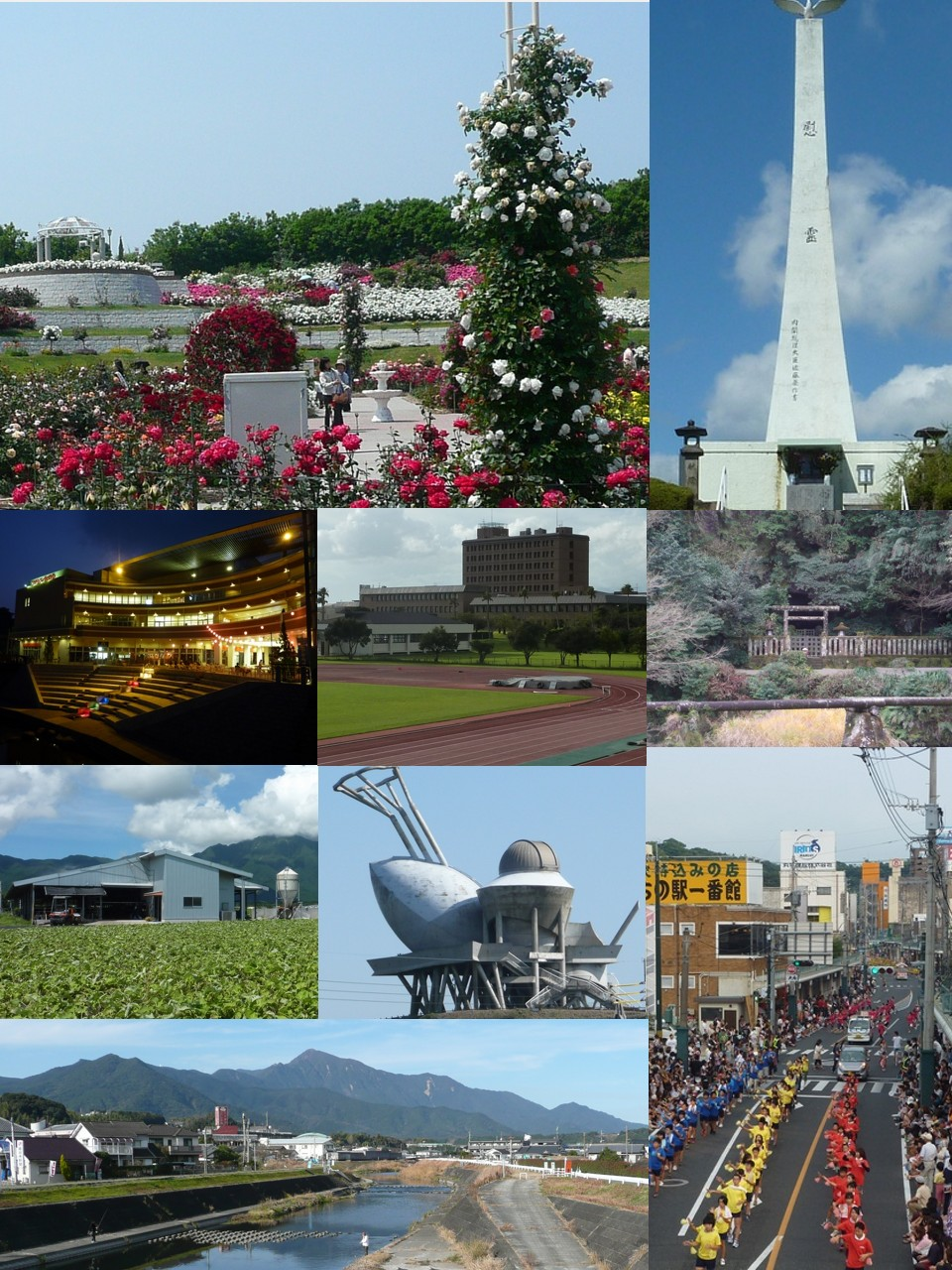
- Top left: Kanoya Rose Park, Top right: Kushira Memorial Tower, 2nd left: Kanoya Ring City, 2nd middle: Kanoya University of Physical Education, 2nd right: Mount Aira Tomb, 3rd left: Kasanohara Plateau, 3rd middle: Kihoku Celestial Sphere Museum, Bottom left :Kimotsuki River and Mount Takakuma, Bottom right: Kanoya Summer Festival

- Flag Emblem

- Location in Japan
- Coordinates: 31°22′42″N 130°51′8″E
- Country: Japan
- Region: Kyushu
- Prefecture: Kagoshima

Government
  - Mayor: Shigeru Nakanishi

Area
  - Total: 448.15 km^{2} (173.03 sq mi)

Population (March 1, 2024)
  - Total: 98,367
  - Density: 219.50/km^{2} (568.49/sq mi)
- Time zone: UTC+09:00 (JST)
- City hall address: 20-1 Kyōeichō, Kanoya-shi, Kagoshima-ken 893-8501
- Climate: Cfa
- Website: Official website
- Symbols
- Flower: Rose
- Tree: Camphor laurel

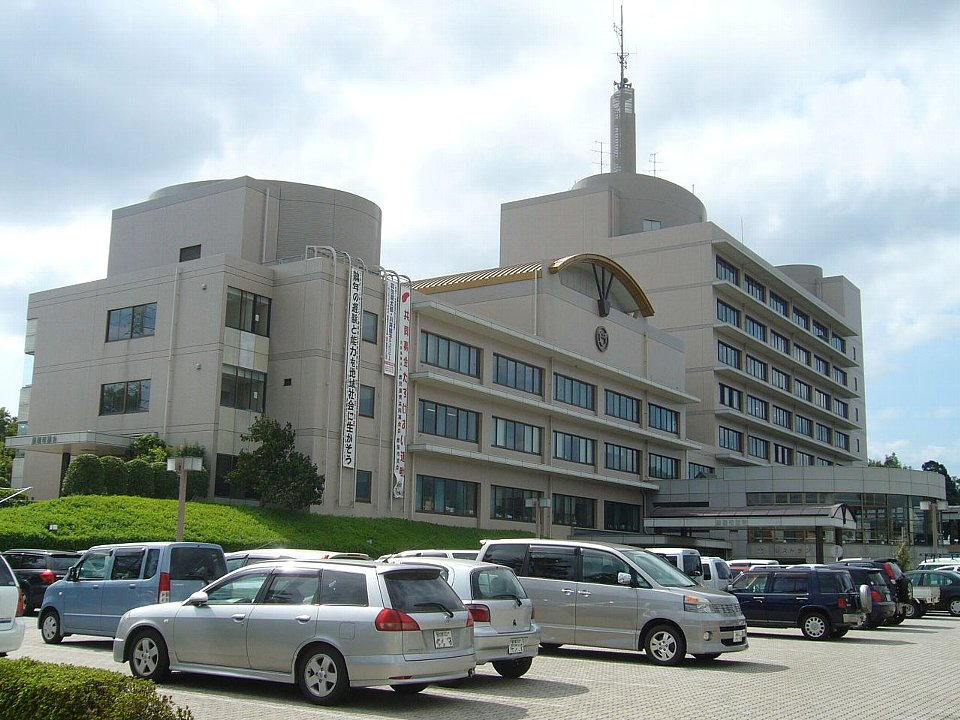
Kanoya City Hall

Kanoya (鹿屋市, Kanoya-shi) is a city in Kagoshima Prefecture, Japan. As of 1 March 2024, the city had an estimated population of 98,367 in 46114 households, and a population density of 100 persons per km^{2}. The total area of the city is 448.15 km^{2} (173.03 sq mi). Kanoya is also popularly called the "Town of Roses".

== Geography ==
Kanoya is located approximately at the heart of Ōsumi Peninsula with its city limits running approximately 20 kilometres (12 mi) east and west and 41 kilometres (25 mi) north and south. The Takakuma Mountains stretch out into the northwestern part of the city and the Kimotsuki Mountains in the southeast. Between both mountain ranges lie the Kasanohara and Kanoyahara plateaus. The Kimotsuki Plains spread through the alluvial plains of the Kimotsuki River that runs through central Kanoya. In the western part of the city is Kinkō Bay (part of Kagoshima Bay) which runs down the coast line.

=== Neighboring municipalities ===
Kagoshima Prefecture

- Higashikushira
- Kimotsuki
- Kinkō
- Kirishima
- Ōsaki in Soo District.
- Soo
- Tarumizu
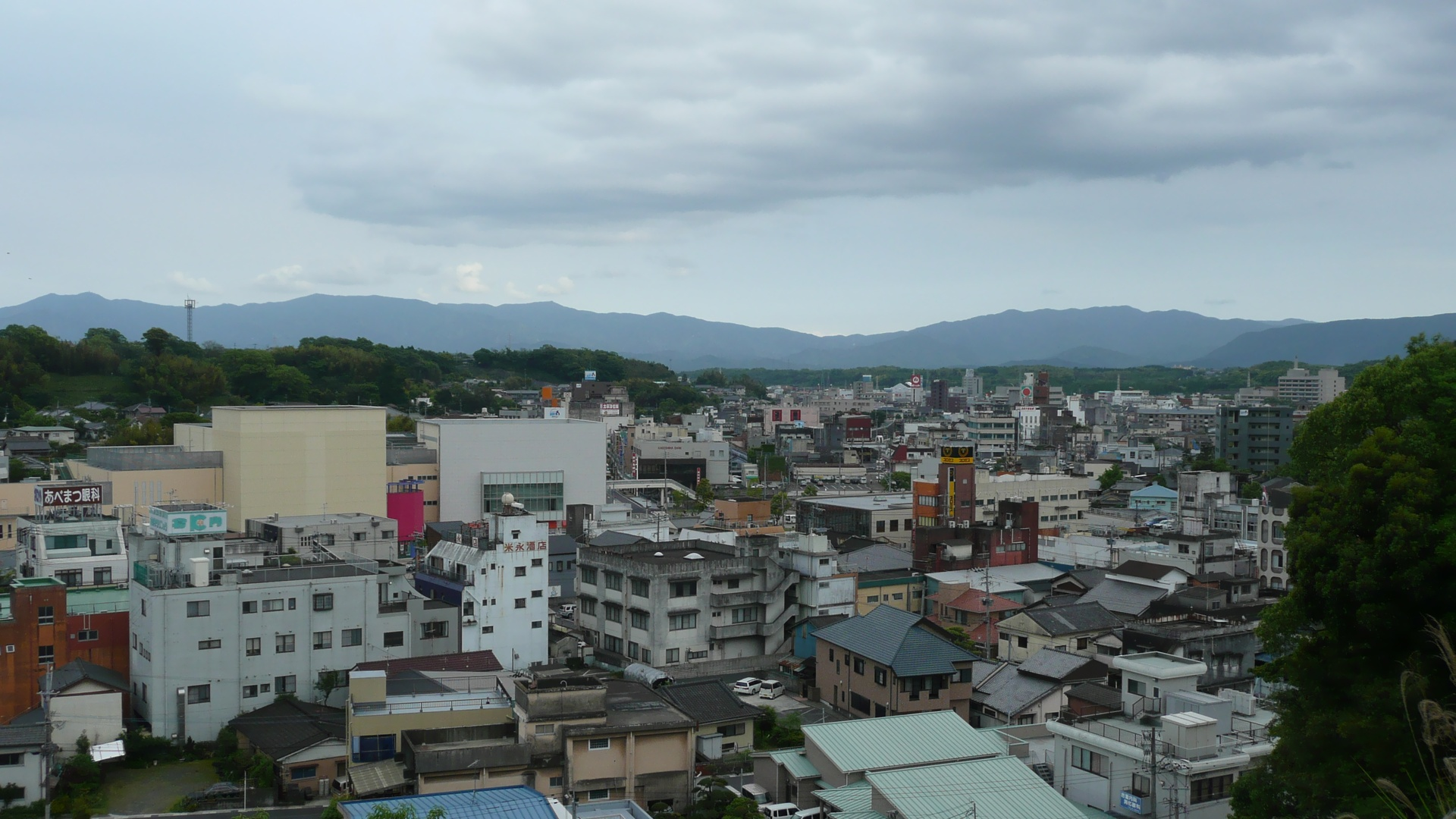
View of downtown Kanoya from Kanoya City Hall

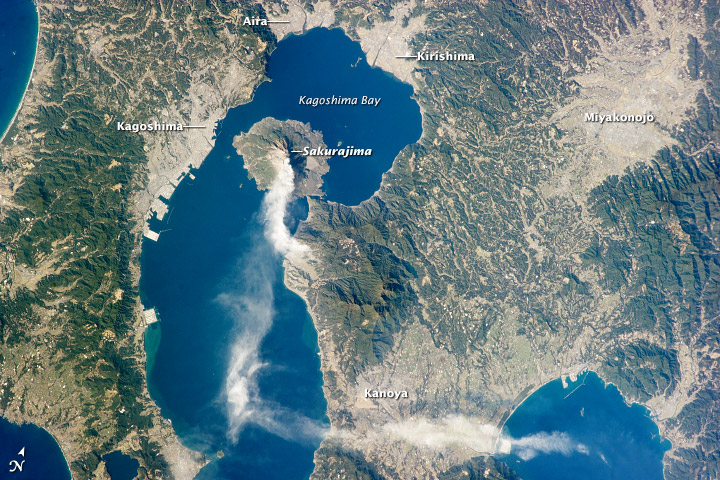
An image taken from the International Space Station showing Kanoya and its surroundings on January 10, 2013

=== Climate ===
Kanoya has a humid subtropical climate (Köppen climate classification Cfa) with hot summers and mild winters. Precipitation is significant throughout the year, and is heavier in summer, especially the months of June and July. The average annual temperature in Kanoya is 17.3 °C (63.1 °F). The average annual rainfall is 2,685.6 mm (105.73 in) with June as the wettest month. The temperatures are highest on average in August, at around 27.5 °C (81.5 °F), and lowest in January, at around 7.5 °C (45.5 °F). Its record high is 38.0 °C (100.4 °F), reached on 3 August 2026, and its record low is −8.0 °C (17.6 °F), reached on 25 January 2016.

Climate data for Kanoya (1991–2020 normals, extremes 1977–present)
Month	Jan	Feb	Mar	Apr	May	Jun	Jul	Aug	Sep	Oct	Nov	Dec	Year
Record high °C (°F)	22.7 (72.9)	24.0 (75.2)	27.4 (81.3)	29.6 (85.3)	33.0 (91.4)	34.5 (94.1)	37.6 (99.7)	38.0 (100.4)	35.8 (96.4)	33.5 (92.3)	29.1 (84.4)	24.6 (76.3)	38.0 (100.4)
Mean daily maximum °C (°F)	12.8 (55.0)	14.2 (57.6)	17.0 (62.6)	21.3 (70.3)	25.1 (77.2)	26.9 (80.4)	31.3 (88.3)	32.1 (89.8)	29.7 (85.5)	25.4 (77.7)	20.2 (68.4)	15.0 (59.0)	22.6 (72.7)
Daily mean °C (°F)	7.5 (45.5)	8.8 (47.8)	11.8 (53.2)	16.0 (60.8)	20.0 (68.0)	23.0 (73.4)	27.0 (80.6)	27.5 (81.5)	24.9 (76.8)	20.0 (68.0)	14.5 (58.1)	9.4 (48.9)	17.5 (63.6)
Mean daily minimum °C (°F)	1.9 (35.4)	3.0 (37.4)	6.3 (43.3)	10.4 (50.7)	15.1 (59.2)	19.7 (67.5)	23.6 (74.5)	23.9 (75.0)	21.0 (69.8)	15.1 (59.2)	8.9 (48.0)	3.5 (38.3)	12.7 (54.9)
Record low °C (°F)	−8.0 (17.6)	−6.8 (19.8)	−4.4 (24.1)	−1.0 (30.2)	3.7 (38.7)	9.1 (48.4)	15.5 (59.9)	17.0 (62.6)	9.3 (48.7)	1.2 (34.2)	−3.5 (25.7)	−6.6 (20.1)	−8.0 (17.6)
Average precipitation mm (inches)	80.3 (3.16)	119.2 (4.69)	173.2 (6.82)	196.9 (7.75)	219.8 (8.65)	623.0 (24.53)	425.6 (16.76)	282.9 (11.14)	288.2 (11.35)	138.3 (5.44)	100.6 (3.96)	77.5 (3.05)	2,685.6 (105.73)
Average precipitation days (≥ 1.0 mm)	8.7	9.3	12.8	11.1	10.6	17.2	12.3	12.5	11.3	7.9	8.6	7.2	129.5
Mean monthly sunshine hours	151.5	152.1	167.5	176.6	173.2	99.6	183.7	202.0	161.1	176.9	157.6	156.6	1,961.7
Source: Japan Meteorological Agency

Climate data for Kihoku, Kanoya (1991–2020 normals, extremes 1977–present)
Month	Jan	Feb	Mar	Apr	May	Jun	Jul	Aug	Sep	Oct	Nov	Dec	Year
Record high °C (°F)	20.7 (69.3)	21.7 (71.1)	24.6 (76.3)	27.9 (82.2)	31.4 (88.5)	33.1 (91.6)	36.2 (97.2)	36.4 (97.5)	33.9 (93.0)	31.3 (88.3)	29.4 (84.9)	21.9 (71.4)	36.4 (97.5)
Mean daily maximum °C (°F)	9.9 (49.8)	11.4 (52.5)	14.6 (58.3)	19.3 (66.7)	23.3 (73.9)	25.2 (77.4)	29.4 (84.9)	30.1 (86.2)	27.5 (81.5)	22.9 (73.2)	17.5 (63.5)	12.1 (53.8)	20.3 (68.5)
Daily mean °C (°F)	5.8 (42.4)	6.9 (44.4)	9.8 (49.6)	14.2 (57.6)	18.3 (64.9)	21.3 (70.3)	25.2 (77.4)	25.5 (77.9)	22.8 (73.0)	18.1 (64.6)	12.9 (55.2)	7.9 (46.2)	15.7 (60.3)
Mean daily minimum °C (°F)	1.9 (35.4)	2.6 (36.7)	5.4 (41.7)	9.6 (49.3)	14.1 (57.4)	18.2 (64.8)	22.1 (71.8)	22.3 (72.1)	19.4 (66.9)	14.2 (57.6)	8.7 (47.7)	3.7 (38.7)	11.8 (53.3)
Record low °C (°F)	−8.3 (17.1)	−7.1 (19.2)	−3.1 (26.4)	0.2 (32.4)	3.3 (37.9)	11.3 (52.3)	14.2 (57.6)	16.4 (61.5)	10.1 (50.2)	3.4 (38.1)	−2.1 (28.2)	−5.2 (22.6)	−8.3 (17.1)
Average precipitation mm (inches)	87.1 (3.43)	131.9 (5.19)	192.3 (7.57)	230.9 (9.09)	258.2 (10.17)	676.2 (26.62)	460.5 (18.13)	298.0 (11.73)	325.7 (12.82)	136.1 (5.36)	112.5 (4.43)	92.6 (3.65)	3,001.9 (118.19)
Average precipitation days (≥ 1.0 mm)	8.9	9.5	13.1	11.5	11.4	17.5	13.7	13.5	12.4	8.3	8.7	8.2	136.7
Mean monthly sunshine hours	141.8	141.9	163.9	167.2	166.3	86.1	149.8	164.3	138.7	168.1	151.4	145.2	1,795.6
Source: Japan Meteorological Agency

== Demographics ==
Within Kagoshima Prefecture, Kanoya is the third most populous city next to Kagoshima (the prefectural capital) and Kirishima.

Historical population

Year	Pop.	±%
1920	60,487	—
1925	62,899	+4.0%
1930	69,982	+11.3%
1935	73,944	+5.7%
1940	79,716	+7.8%
1945	104,880	+31.6%
1950	107,579	+2.6%
1955	114,804	+6.7%
1960	109,662	−4.5%
1965	103,358	−5.7%
1970	95,915	−7.2%

Year	Pop.	±%
1975	94,790	−1.2%
1980	100,005	+5.5%
1985	102,653	+2.6%
1990	103,761	+1.1%
1995	105,059	+1.3%
2000	106,462	+1.3%
2005	106,208	−0.2%
2010	105,086	−1.1%
2015	103,608	−1.4%
2020	101,096	−2.4%

Kanoya population statistics

== History ==
The area of Kanoya was part of ancient Ōsumi Province, and was part of the Shimazu-shō, a vast shōen landed manor in Ōsumi, Satsuma that was opened at the end of the Heian period, and which evolved into Satsuma Domain in the Edo period. After the Meiji restoration, the village of Kanoya was established with the creation of the modern municipalities system on April 1, 1889. Kanoya was raised to town status on December 31, 1912. On May 27, 1941, Kanoya merged with the villages of Hanaoka and Oaira to form the city of Kanoya.

In 2006, the original city of Kanoya was expanded following the merger of the two towns of Aira and Kushira in Kimotsuki District, and Kihoku in Soo District. The original Kanoya City was established as a municipality on May 27, 1941 (Navy Memorial Day).

== Government ==
Kanoya has a mayor-council form of government with a directly elected mayor and a unicameral city council of 26 members. Kanoya, collectively with the city of Tarumizu contributes four members to the Kagoshima Prefectural Assembly. In terms of national politics, the city is part of the Kagoshima 4th district of the lower house of the Diet of Japan.

Kanoya is home to the Japan Maritime Self-Defense Force Kanoya Air Field.

== Economy ==
Kanoya has a primary economy centering on agriculture, fishing, livestock raising and food processing. Kanoya's specialties include Berkshire pig, peanuts, broilers, and sweet potatoes.

== Education ==
Kanoya has 23 public elementary schools and 12 public junior high schools operated by the city government and five public high schools operated by the Kagoshima Prefectural Board of Education. There is also one private high school. The city also hosts the National Institute of Fitness and Sports in Kanoya.

== Transportation ==
=== Railway ===
Kanoya is the most populous city in Japan outside of Okinawa Prefecture without passenger rail services, after the closure of the Ōsumi Line in 1987.

The nearest station is Shibushi Station on the JR Kyushu Nichinan Line, but the nearest practical station is Kagoshima-Chūō Station on the Kyushu Shinkansen. In both cases, it takes more than an hour to reach the station by private car, or two hours by bus.

=== Highway ===
- Higashikyushu Expressway
- National Route 220
- National Route 269
- National Route 504

== Local attractions ==
- Kanoya Air Base Museum
- Takakuma Dam

== Notable people from Kanoya ==
- Sunshine Ikezaki (Real Name: Satoru Ikezaki, Nihongo: 池崎 慧, Ikezaki Satoru), Japanese comedian
- Sayuri Kokushō (Nihongo: 国生さゆり or 國生さゆり, Kokusho Sayuri), Japanese actress, singer, and tarento
- Yamato Maeda (Nihongo: 前田 大和, Maeda Yamato), Japanese professional baseball outfielder (Yokohama DeNA BayStars, Nippon Professional Baseball)
- Yuka Nishida (Nihongo: 西田 優香, Nishida Yuka), Japanese judoka
- Taiga Satoru (Real Name: Satoshi Kawasaki, Nihongo: 川崎悟司, Kawasaki Satoshi), Japanese sumo wrestler
- Sakura Yokomine (Nihongo: 横峯さくら, Yokomine Sakura), Japanese professional golfer (LPGA Tour and LPGA of Japan Tour)
