= Kihoku =

Kihoku is a place name in Japan:

- Kihoku, Ehime, a town in Ehime Prefecture
- Kihoku, Kagoshima, a former town in Kagoshima Prefecture
- Kihoku, Mie, a town in Mie Prefecture
