= Matsumoto Dam =

Dam in Kagoshima Prefecture, Japan

- Location within Japan
- Official name: 松元ダム
- Location: Naoki-chō, Kagoshima, Kagoshima Prefecture, Japan
- Coordinates: 31°33′53″N 130°25′04″E
- Construction began: 1986
- Opening date: 2002

Dam and spillways
- Height: 38.5 m (126 ft)
- Length: 144 m (472 ft)

Reservoir
- Total capacity: 640 thousand cubic meters
- Catchment area: 2.9 sq. km
- Surface area: 6 hectares

Matsumoto Dam (Japanese: 松元ダム) is a gravity dam located in Kagoshima, Kagoshima Prefecture in Japan. The dam is used for irrigation. The catchment area of the dam is 2.9 km^{2}. When full, the dam's surface area stretches to about 6 ha, storing 640 thousand cubic meters of water. The construction of the dam was started in 1986 and completed in 2002.

== See also ==
- List of dams in Kagoshima Prefecture
