= Kushira, Kagoshima =

Dissolved municipality in Kagoshima prefecture, Japan

Coordinates: 31°23′N 130°57′E

Kushira (串良町, Kushira-chō) was a town located in Kimotsuki District, Kagoshima Prefecture, Japan.

As of 2003, the town had an estimated population of 13,575 and the density of 206.12 persons per km^{2}. The total area was 65.86 km^{2}.

On January 1, 2006, Kushira, along with the town of Aira (also from Kimotsuki District), and the town of Kihoku (from Soo District), was merged into the expanded city of Kanoya and no longer exists as an independent municipality.
