= Aira, Kagoshima (Kimotsuki District) =

Dissolved municipality in Kimotsuki district, Kagoshima prefecture, Japan

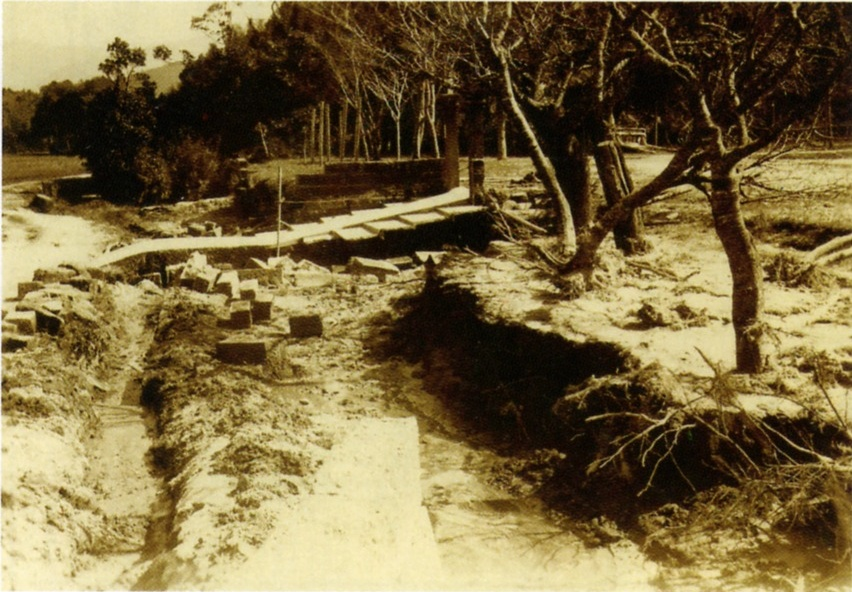
1938 Kimotsuki District Storm and Flood Damages (Tsurumine Elementary School - Present Aira, Kanoya, City, Kagoshima, Japan

Aira (吾平町, Aira-chō) was a town located in Kimotsuki District, Kagoshima Prefecture, Japan.

As of December 1, 2005, the town had an estimated population of 7,542 and the density of 127.5 persons per km^{2}. The total area was 59.15 km^{2}.

On January 1, 2006, Aira, along with the town of Kushira (also from Kimotsuki District), and the town of Kihoku (from Soo District), was merged into the expanded city of Kanoya and no longer exists as an independent municipality.
