= Kihoku, Kagoshima =

Dissolved municipality in Kagoshima prefecture, Japan

Kihoku (輝北町, Kihoku-chō) was a town located in Soo District, Kagoshima Prefecture, Japan.

As of 2003, the town had an estimated population of 4,275 and the density of 48.06 persons per km^{2}. The total area was 88.95 km^{2}.

On January 1, 2006, Kihoku, along with the towns of Aira and Kushira (both from Kimotsuki District), was merged into the expanded city of Kanoya and no longer exists as an independent municipality.
