= Jisso Dam =

Dam in Kagoshima Prefecture, Japan

- Location within Japan
- Interactive map of Jisso Dam
- Official name: 十曽ダム
- Location: Kagoshima Prefecture, Japan
- Coordinates: 32°6′35″N 130°36′06″E
- Opening date: 1946

Dam and spillways
- Height: 23.3 m (76 ft)
- Length: 90 m (300 ft)

Reservoir
- Total capacity: 480 thousand cubic meters
- Surface area: 9 hectares

Jisso Dam (Japanese: 十曽ダム) is a gravity dam located in Kagoshima Prefecture in Japan. The dam is used for irrigation. The surface area of the dam is about 9 ha when full and can store 480 thousand cubic meters of water. The construction of the dam was completed in 1946.

== See also ==
- List of dams in Japan
