= Nanbu Dam =

Dam in Kagoshima Prefecture, Japan

- Location within Japan
- Official name: 南部ダム
- Location: Kagoshima Prefecture, Japan
- Coordinates: 27°47′23″N 128°56′51″E
- Opening date: 1969

Dam and spillways
- Height: 25.2 m (83 ft)
- Length: 140 m (460 ft)

Reservoir
- Total capacity: 374 thousand cubic meters
- Surface area: 10 hectares

Nanbu Dam (Japanese: 南部ダム) is an earthfill dam located in Kagoshima Prefecture in Japan. The dam is used for irrigation and water supply. When the reservoir is full, the surface area of the dam is about 10, and can store 374 thousand cubic meters of water. The construction of the dam was completed in 1969.

== See also ==
- List of dams in Japan
