= Kawanabe (surname) =

Kawanabe (written: 川鍋, 川辺 or 河鍋) is a Japanese surname. Notable people with the surname include:

- Kawanabe Kyōsai (河鍋 暁斎, 1839–1889), Japanese artist
- Kawanabe Kyōsui (河鍋 暁翠, 1868–1935), Japanese painter
- Ryosuke Kawanabe (川鍋 良祐, born 1986), Japanese footballer
- Takaya Kawanabe (川辺 隆弥, born 1988), Japanese footballer
