= Boma Dam =

Dam in Kagoshima Prefecture, Japan

- Location within Japan
- Interactive map of Boma Dam
- Official name: 母間ダム
- Location: Kagoshima Prefecture, Japan
- Coordinates: 27°47′55″N 128°58′09″E
- Opening date: 1963

Dam and spillways
- Height: 17 m (56 ft)
- Length: 89 m (292 ft)

Reservoir
- Total capacity: 116 thousand cubic meters
- Catchment area: 0.8 sq. km
- Surface area: 2 hectares

Boma Dam (Japanese: 母間ダム) is an earthfill dam located in Kagoshima Prefecture in Japan. The dam is used for irrigation. The catchment area of the dam is 0.8 km^{2}. The dam surface area of the dam is about 2 ha when full. It can store 116 thousand cubic meters of water. The construction of the dam was completed in 1963.

== See also ==
- List of dams in Japan
