= Tanikawauchi Dam =

Dam in Kagoshima Prefecture, Japan

- Location within Japan
- Official name: 谷川内ダム
- Location: Kagoshima Prefecture, Japan
- Coordinates: 31°44′03″N 130°56′24″E
- Construction began: 1984
- Opening date: 2012

Dam and spillways
- Height: 58.5 m (192 ft)
- Length: 222 m (728 ft)

Reservoir
- Total capacity: 2,170,000 m^{3} (77,000,000 cu ft)
- Catchment area: 14.1 km^{2} (5.4 sq mi)
- Surface area: 12 hectares (30 acres)

Tanikawauchi Dam (Japanese: 谷川内ダム) is a gravity dam located in Kagoshima Prefecture in Japan. The dam is used for irrigation. The catchment area of the dam is 14.1 km^{2}. The dam's surface area is about 12 ha when full and can store 2,170 thousand cubic meters of water. The construction of the dam was started in 1984 and completed in 2012.

== See also ==
- List of dams in Japan
