= Kiyoura Dam =

Dam in Kagoshima Prefecture, Japan

- Location within Japan
- Official name: 清浦ダム
- Location: Kagoshima Prefecture, Japan
- Coordinates: 31°45′22″N 130°28′08″E
- Opening date: 1974

Dam and spillways
- Height: 38.1 m (125 ft)
- Length: 66.5 m (218 ft)

Reservoir
- Total capacity: 1000 thousand cubic meters
- Catchment area: 8.7 sq. km
- Surface area: 11 hectares

Kiyoura Dam (Japanese: 清浦ダム) is a gravity dam located in Kagoshima Prefecture in Japan. The dam is used for flood control. The catchment area of the dam is 8.7 km^{2}. The dam's surface area grows to about 11 ha when full, storing 1,000 thousand cubic meters of water. The construction of the dam was completed in 1974.

== See also ==
- List of dams in Japan
