= Seibu Dam =

Dam in Kagoshima Prefecture, Japan

- Location within Japan
- Official name: 西部ダム
- Location: Kagoshima Prefecture, Japan
- Coordinates: 27°49′18″N 128°55′56″E
- Opening date: 1968

Dam and spillways
- Height: 16.7 m (55 ft)
- Length: 72 m (236 ft)

Reservoir
- Total capacity: 155,000 m^{3} (5,500,000 cu ft)
- Surface area: 3 hectares (7.4 acres)

Seibu Dam (Japanese: 西部ダム) is an earthfill dam located in Kagoshima Prefecture in Japan. The dam is used for irrigation.

At full storage, the dam's surface area reaches about 3 ha of land and can store 155 thousand cubic meters of water. The construction of the dam was completed in 1968.

== See also ==
- List of dams in Japan
