= Takeyama Dam =

Dam in Kagoshima Prefecture, Japan

- Location within Japan
- Official name: 竹山ダム
- Location: Kagoshima Prefecture, Japan
- Coordinates: 31°48′47″N 130°39′54″E
- Construction began: 1974
- Opening date: 1987

Dam and spillways
- Height: 54.5 m (179 ft)
- Length: 163 m (535 ft)

Reservoir
- Total capacity: 2,207,000 m^{3} (77,900,000 cu ft)
- Catchment area: 10.5 km^{2} (4.1 sq mi)
- Surface area: 15 hectares (37 acres)

Takeyama Dam (Japanese: 竹山ダム) is a rockfill dam located in Kagoshima Prefecture in Japan. The dam is used for irrigation. The catchment area of the dam is 10.5 km^{2}. The dam's surface area is about 15 ha when full and can store 2207 thousand cubic meters of water. The construction of the dam was started in 1974 and completed in 1987.

== See also ==
- List of dams in Japan
