= Takaono Dam =

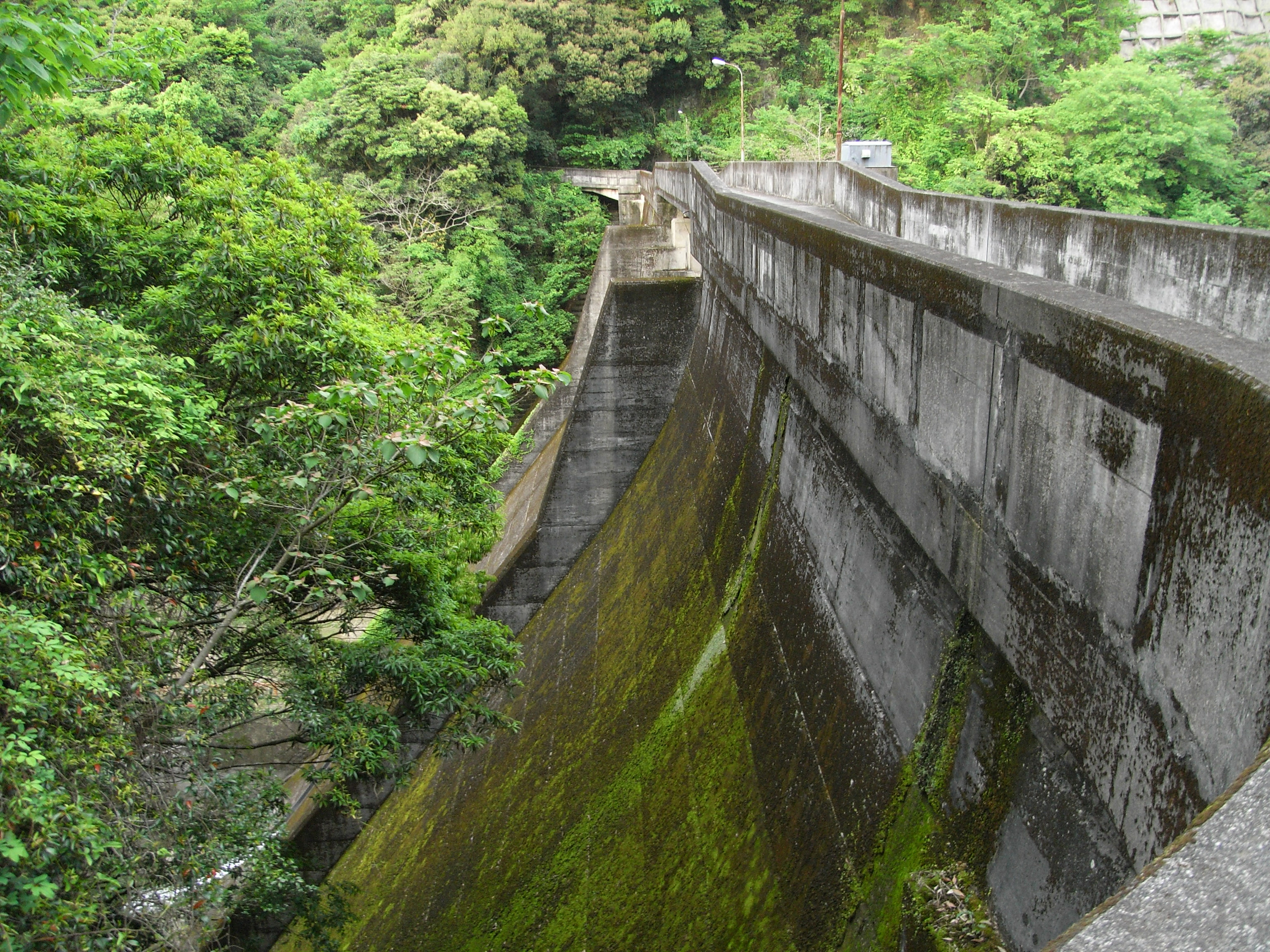
- Interactive map of Takaono Dam
- Location: Kagoshima Prefecture, Japan
- Coordinates: 32°01′41″N 130°18′37″E

Takaono Dam (Japanese: 高尾野ダム) is a dam in Kagoshima Prefecture, Japan. The 35-meter (115 ft) high dam was completed in 1966.
