= Yamato Dam =

Dam in Kagoshima Prefecture, Japan

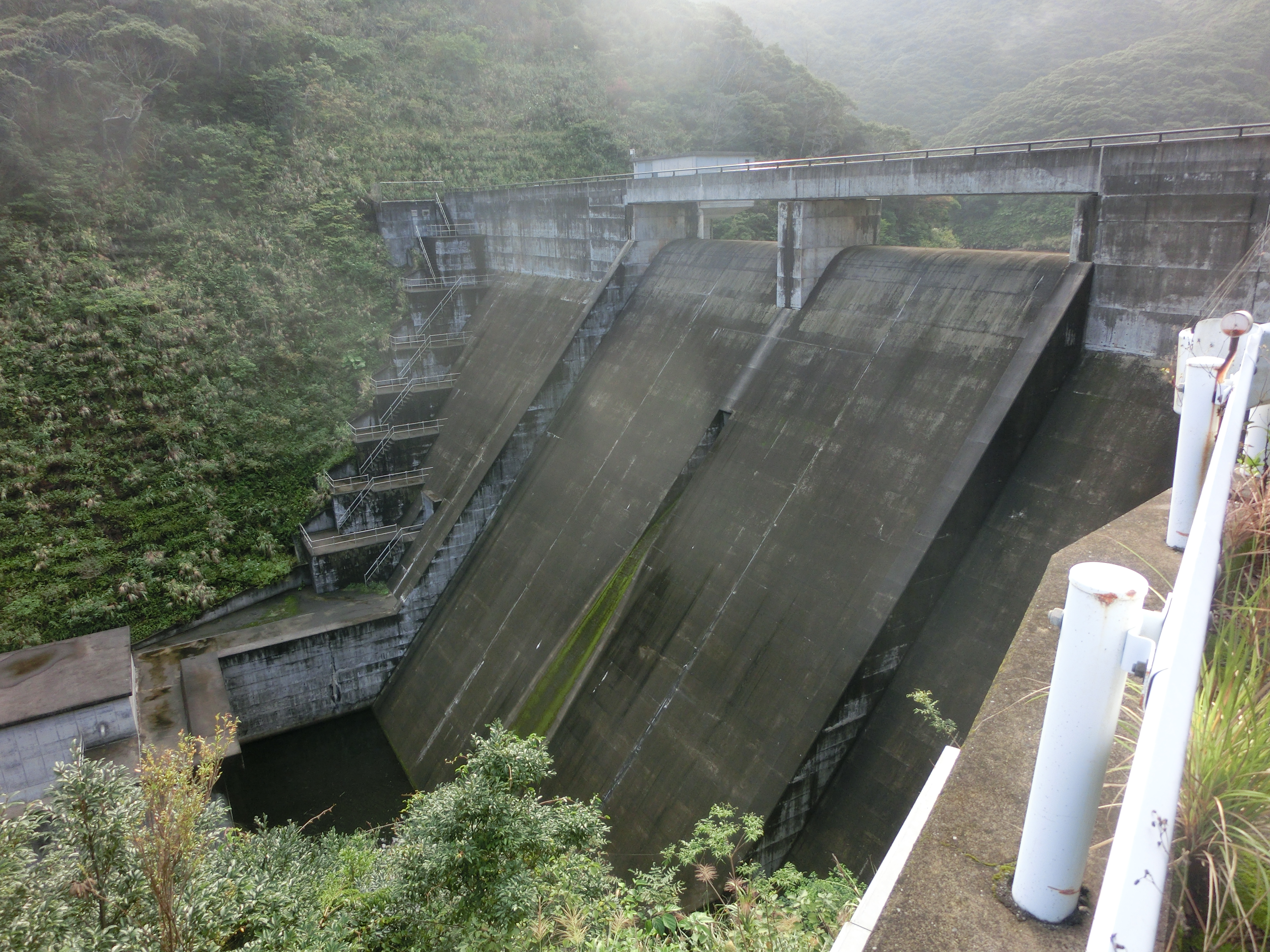

- Location within Japan
- Official name: 大和ダム
- Location: Kagoshima Prefecture, Japan
- Coordinates: 28°20′34″N 129°23′15″E
- Construction began: 1990
- Opening date: 2006

Dam and spillways
- Height: 45 m (148 ft)
- Length: 90 m (300 ft)

Reservoir
- Total capacity: 784,000 m^{3} (27,700,000 cu ft)
- Catchment area: 2.1 km^{2} (0.81 sq mi)
- Surface area: 6 hectares (15 acres)

Yamato Dam (Japanese: 大和ダム) is a gravity dam located in Kagoshima Prefecture in Japan. The dam is used for flood control and water supply. The catchment area of the dam is 2.1 km^{2}. The dam's surface area stretches to about 6 ha when full and can store 784 thousand cubic meters of water. The construction of the dam was started in 1990 and completed in 2006.

== See also ==
- List of dams in Japan
