= Sendaigawa Dam =

Dam in Kagoshima Prefecture, Japan

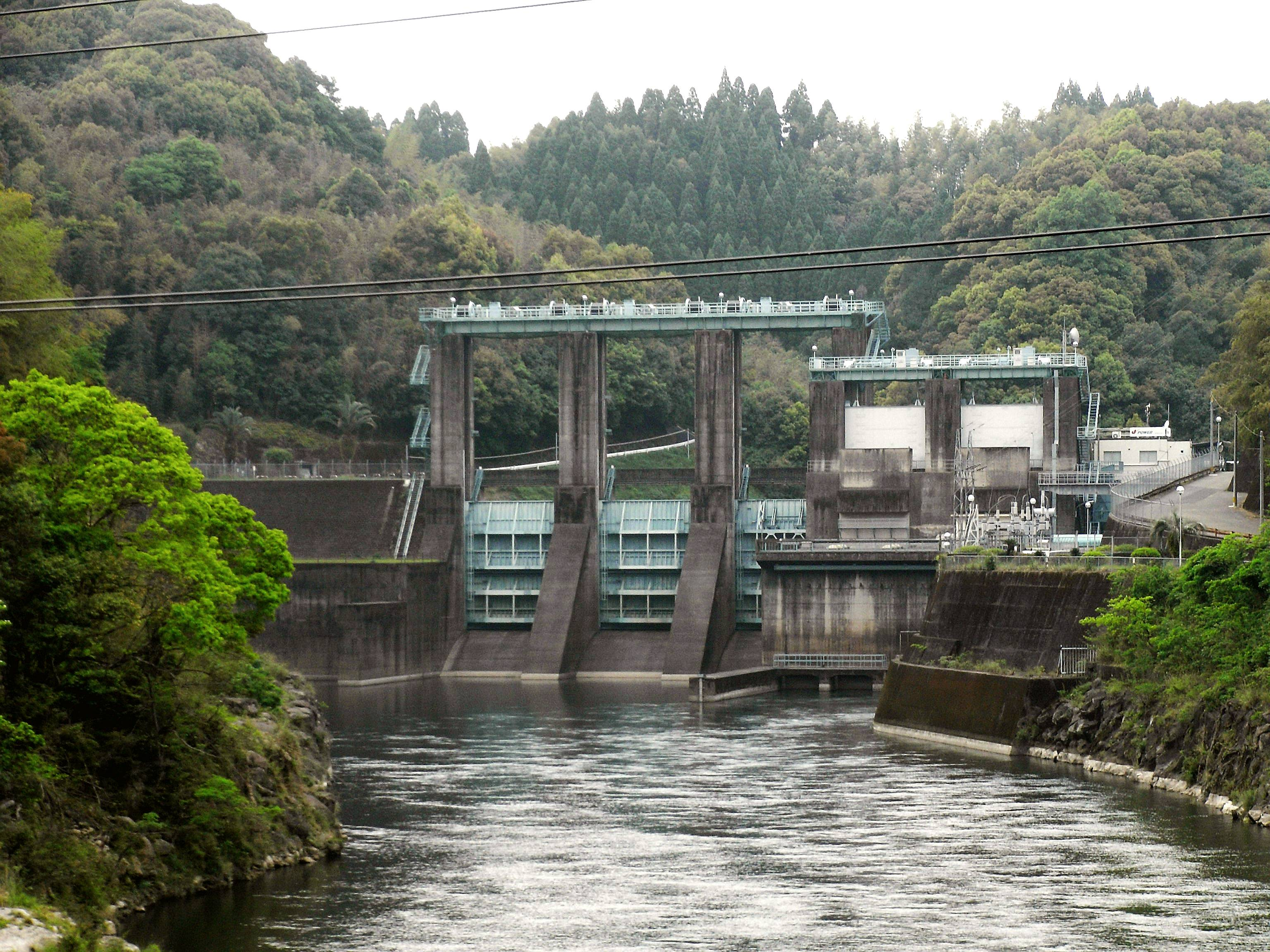

- Location within Japan
- Official name: 川内川第２ダム
- Location: Kagoshima Prefecture, Japan
- Coordinates: 31°57′32″N 130°29′57″E
- Opening date: 1964

Dam and spillways
- Type of dam: Gravity dam
- Height: 24 m (79 ft)
- Length: 106.9 m (351 ft)
- Dam volume: 17,000 m^{3}

Reservoir
- Total capacity: 2.725 million m^{3}
- Catchment area: 813.6 km^{2}
- Surface area: 32 hectares (79 acres)

Sendaigawa Dam or Sendaigawa No. 2 Dam is a dam in Kagoshima Prefecture, Japan, completed in 1964. This gravity dam is built for generating hydroelectric power.

== See also ==
- List of dams in Japan
