= Nakadake Dam =

Dam in Kagoshima Prefecture, Japan

- Location within Japan
- Official name: 中岳ダム
- Location: Kagoshima Prefecture, Japan
- Coordinates: 31°38′29″N 131°5′23″E
- Construction began: 1981
- Opening date: 2007

Dam and spillways
- Height: 69.9 m (229 ft)
- Length: 312.5 m (1,025 ft)

Reservoir
- Total capacity: 4310 thousand cubic meters
- Catchment area: 1.9 sq. km
- Surface area: 28 hectares

Nakadake Dam (Japanese: 中岳ダム) is a rockfill dam located in Kagoshima Prefecture in Japan. The dam is used for irrigation. The catchment area of the dam is 1.9 km^{2}. When full, the dam's surface area stretches to about 28 ha, storing 4,310 thousand cubic meters of water. The construction of the dam was started in 1981 and completed in 2007.

== See also ==
- List of dams in Japan
