= Nagayoshi Dam =

Dam in Kagoshima Prefecture, Japan

- Location within Japan
- Official name: 永吉ダム
- Location: Fukiage-chō Nagayoshi, Hioki, Kagoshima Prefecture, Japan
- Coordinates: 31°32′58″N 130°24′53″E
- Construction began: 1970
- Opening date: 1979

Dam and spillways
- Height: 37 m (121 ft)
- Length: 148 m (486 ft)

Reservoir
- Total capacity: 1174 thousand cubic meters
- Catchment area: 8 sq. km
- Surface area: 9 hectares

Nagayoshi Dam (Japanese: 永吉ダム) is a rockfill dam located in Hioki, Kagoshima Prefecture in Japan. The dam is used for flood control and irrigation. The catchment area of the dam is 8 km^{2}. The dam impounds about 9 ha of land when full and can store 1174 thousand cubic meters of water. The construction of the dam was started in 1970 and completed in 1979.

== See also ==
- List of dams in Japan
