= Kushikino Dam =

Dam in Kagoshima Prefecture, Japan

- Location within Japan
- Official name: 串木野ダム
- Location: Kagoshima Prefecture, Japan
- Coordinates: 31°44′05″N 130°19′34″E
- Opening date: 1970

Dam and spillways
- Height: 31.7 m (104 ft)
- Length: 134 m (440 ft)

Reservoir
- Total capacity: 1660 thousand cubic meters
- Catchment area: 13 sq. km
- Surface area: 17 hectares

Kushikino Dam (Japanese: 串木野ダム) is a rockfill dam located in Kagoshima Prefecture in Japan. The dam is used for flood control. The catchment area of the dam is 13 km^{2}. The dam's surface area swells to about 17 ha when full, storing 1,660 thousand cubic meters of water. The construction of the dam was completed in 1970.

== See also ==
- List of dams in Japan
