= Saikyo Dam =

Dam in Kagoshima Prefecture, Japan

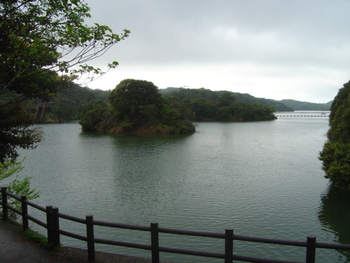

- Location within Japan
- Official name: 西京ダム
- Location: Kagoshima Prefecture, Japan
- Coordinates: 30°45′53″N 131°1′56″E
- Construction began: 1979
- Opening date: 1987

Dam and spillways
- Height: 29.7 m (97 ft)
- Length: 133.8 m (439 ft)

Reservoir
- Total capacity: 2,301,000 m^{3} (81,300,000 cu ft)
- Catchment area: 4.2 km^{2} (1.6 sq mi)
- Surface area: 26 hectares (64 acres)

Saikyo Dam (Japanese: 西京ダム) is a rockfill dam located in Kagoshima Prefecture in Japan. The dam is used for irrigation and water supply. The catchment area of the dam is 4.2 km^{2}.

At full storage, the dam's surface area stretches to about 26 ha and can store 2301 thousand cubic meters of water. The construction of the dam was started in 1979 and completed in 1987.

== See also ==
- List of dams in Japan
