= Nishinotani Dam =

Dam in Kagoshima Prefecture, Japan

- Location within Japan
- Official name: 西之谷ダム
- Location: Kagoshima Prefecture, Japan
- Coordinates: 31°36′03″N 130°30′08″E
- Construction began: 1990
- Opening date: 2012

Dam and spillways
- Height: 21.5 m (71 ft)
- Length: 135.8 m (446 ft)

Reservoir
- Total capacity: 793,000 m^{3} (28,000,000 cu ft)
- Catchment area: 6.8 km^{2} (2.6 sq mi)

Nishinotani Dam (Japanese: 西之谷ダム) located in Kagoshima Prefecture, Japan, is a gravity dam used for flood control. It has a catchment area of 6.8 km² and can store 793,000 cubic meters of water. Construction began in 1990 and was completed in 2012.

== See also ==
- List of dams in Japan
