= Ohkawa Dam =

Dam in Kagoshima Prefecture, Japan

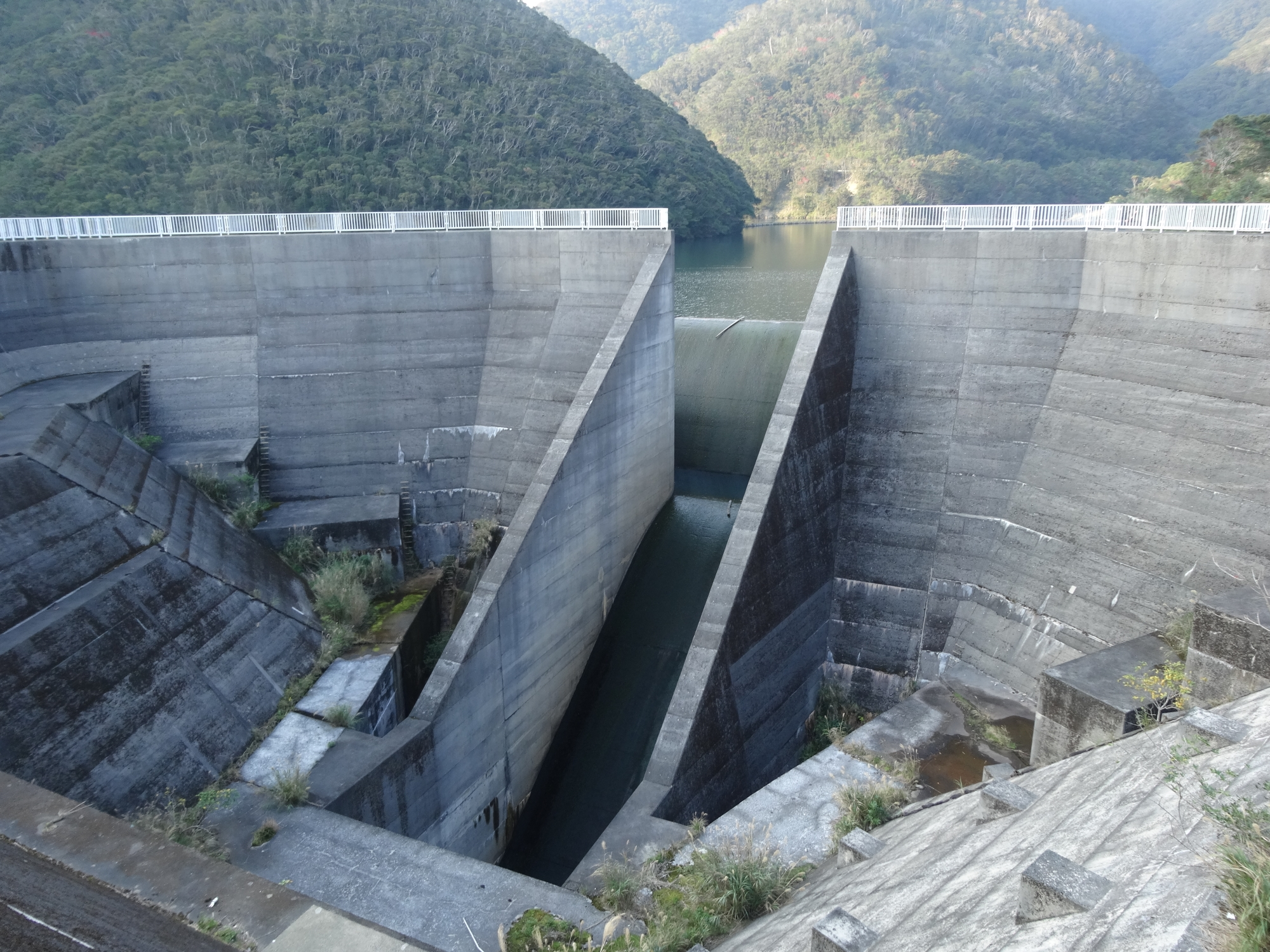

- Location within Japan
- Official name: 大川ダム（再）
- Location: Kagoshima Prefecture, Japan
- Coordinates: 28°20′29″N 129°29′01″E
- Construction began: 1983
- Opening date: 1986

Dam and spillways
- Height: 49.2 m (161 ft)
- Length: 161.4 m (530 ft)

Reservoir
- Total capacity: 2,320,000 m^{3} (82,000,000 cu ft)
- Catchment area: 11.1 km^{2} (4.3 sq mi)
- Surface area: 19 hectares (47 acres)

Ohkawa Dam (Japanese: 大川ダム（再）) is a rockfill dam located in Kagoshima Prefecture in Japan. The dam is used for irrigation and water supply. The catchment area of the dam is 11.1 km^{2}. The surface area of the dam can reach about 19 ha of land when full and can store 2320 thousand cubic meters of water. The construction of the dam was started in 1983 and completed in 1986.

== See also ==
- List of dams in Japan
