= Mitarai Dam =

Dam in Kagoshima Prefecture, Japan

- Location within Japan
- Official name: 御手洗ダム
- Location: Kagoshima Prefecture, Japan
- Coordinates: 32°1′30″N 130°18′13″E
- Construction began: 1971
- Opening date: 1982

Dam and spillways
- Height: 43.4 m (142 ft)
- Length: 160 m (520 ft)

Reservoir
- Total capacity: 1180 thousand cubic meters
- Catchment area: 6.6 sq. km
- Surface area: 8 hectares

Mitarai Dam (Japanese: 御手洗ダム) is a rockfill dam located in Kagoshima Prefecture in Japan. The dam is used for flood control and recreation. The catchment area of the dam is 6.6 km^{2}. When full, the dam impounds about 8 ha of land and can store 1,180 thousand cubic meters of water. The construction of the dam was started in 1971 and completed in 1982.

== See also ==
- List of dams in Japan
