= Kōgawa Dam =

Kougawa Dam
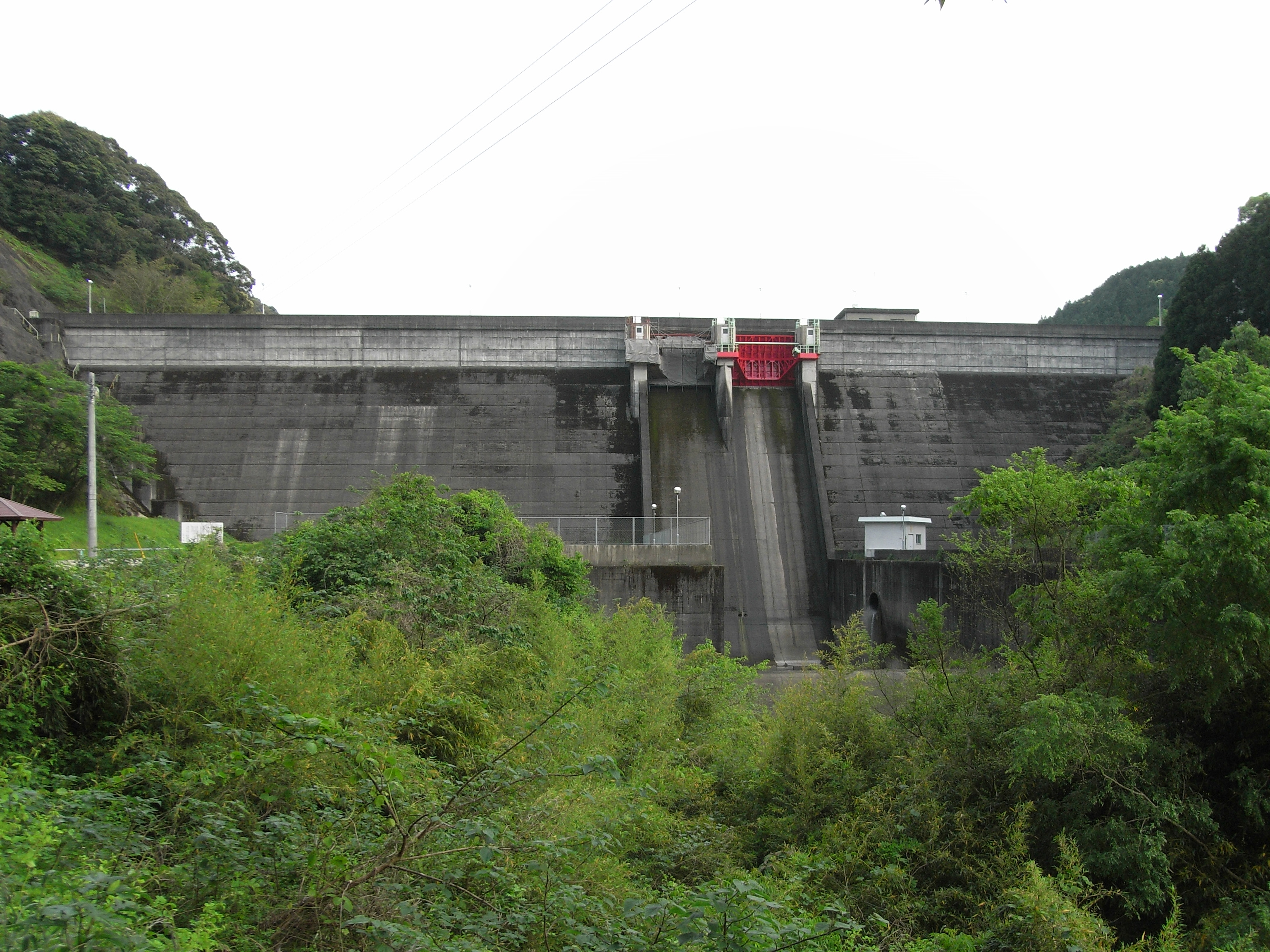
- Interactive map of Kougawa Dam
- Location: Kagoshima Prefecture, Japan
- Coordinates: 32°03′53″N 130°24′16″E
- Construction began: -
- Opening date: 1973

Dam and spillways
- Type of dam: Gravity dam
- Height: 42.0 m (137.8 ft)
- Length: 163.5 m (536 ft)
- Dam volume: 81,000 m^{3}

Reservoir
- Total capacity: 8,500,000 m^{3}
- Catchment area: 23.5 km^{2}
- Surface area: 85.0 ha

Kōgawa Dam (Japanese: 高川ダム) is a dam built on the Takagawa River in Kagoshima Prefecture, Japan, completed in 1973.
