= Takanosu Dam (Kagoshima) =

Dam in Kagoshima Prefecture, Japan

- Location within Japan
- Official name: 鷹巣ダム
- Location: Kagoshima Prefecture, Japan
- Coordinates: 32°12′10″N 130°10′58″E
- Construction began: 1979
- Opening date: 1988

Dam and spillways
- Height: 28.9 m (95 ft)
- Length: 117.4 m (385 ft)

Reservoir
- Total capacity: 290,000 m^{3} (10,000,000 cu ft)
- Catchment area: 1.8 km^{2} (0.69 sq mi)
- Surface area: 4 hectares (9.9 acres)

Takanosu Dam (Japanese: 鷹巣ダム) is an earthfill dam located in Kagoshima Prefecture in Japan. The dam is used for irrigation. The catchment area of the dam is 1.8 km^{2}. The dam impounds about 4 ha of land when full and can store 290 thousand cubic meters of water. The construction of the dam was started in 1979 and completed in 1988.

== See also ==
- List of dams in Japan
