= Tokunoshima Dam =

Dam in Kagoshima Prefecture, Japan

- Location within Japan
- Official name: 徳之島ダム
- Location: Kagoshima Prefecture, Japan
- Coordinates: 27°46′30″N 128°55′39″E
- Construction began: 1994
- Opening date: 2015

Dam and spillways
- Height: 56.3 m (185 ft)
- Length: 266.9 m (876 ft)

Reservoir
- Total capacity: 8,120,000 m^{3} (287,000,000 cu ft)
- Catchment area: 28.6 km^{2} (11.0 sq mi)
- Surface area: 63 hectares (160 acres)

Tokunoshima Dam (Japanese: 徳之島ダム) is a rockfill dam located in Kagoshima Prefecture in Japan. The dam is used for irrigation. The catchment area of the dam is 28.6 km^{2}. At full capacity the dam's surface area is about 63 ha and it can store 8120 thousand cubic meters of water. The construction of the dam was started in 1994 and completed in 2015.

== See also ==
- List of dams in Japan
