= Shinsumiyogawa Dam =

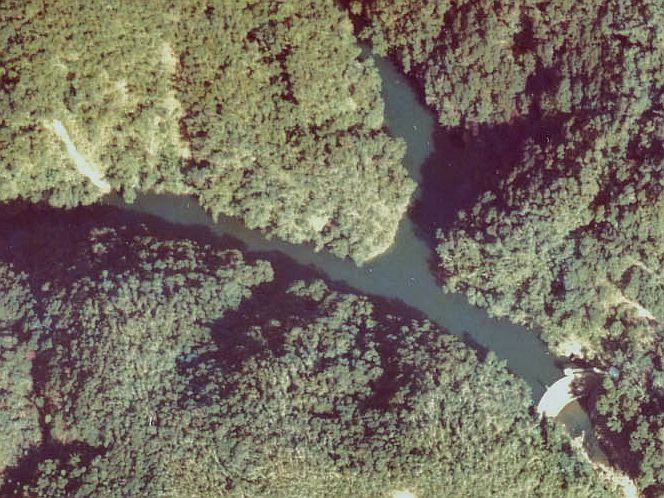
- Interactive map of Shinsumiyogawa Dam
- Location: Kagoshima Prefecture, Japan
- Coordinates: 28°17′19″N 129°23′10″E

Shinsumiyogawa Dam (Japanese: 新住用川ダム) is a dam on the Sumiyo River in Kagoshima Prefecture, Japan, completed in 1959.
