= Suno Dam =

Dam in Kagoshima Prefecture, Japan

- Location within Japan
- Official name: 須野ダム
- Location: Kagoshima Prefecture, Japan
- Coordinates: 28°28′23″N 129°41′55″E
- Construction began: 1986
- Opening date: 1998

Dam and spillways
- Height: 27.5 m (90 ft)
- Length: 142 m (466 ft)

Reservoir
- Total capacity: 990,000 m^{3} (35,000,000 cu ft)
- Catchment area: 1.9 km^{2} (0.73 sq mi)
- Surface area: 13 hectares (32 acres)

Suno Dam (Japanese: 須野ダム) is an earthfill dam located in Kagoshima Prefecture in Japan. The dam is used for irrigation and water supply. The catchment area of the dam is 1.9 km^{2}. The surface area of the dam is about 13 ha when full and can store 990 thousand cubic meters of water. The construction of the dam started on 1986 and was completed in 1998.

== See also ==
- List of dams in Japan
