= Isenchubu Dam =

Dam in Kagoshima Prefecture, Japan

- Location within Japan
- Interactive map of Isenchubu Dam
- Official name: 伊仙中部ダム
- Location: Kagoshima Prefecture, Japan
- Coordinates: 27°42′23″N 128°56′38″E
- Construction began: 1979
- Opening date: 1987

Dam and spillways
- Height: 29 m (95 ft)
- Length: 224 m (735 ft)

Reservoir
- Total capacity: 1220 thousand cubic meters
- Catchment area: 7.1 sq. km
- Surface area: 18 hectares

Isenchubu Dam (Japanese: 伊仙中部ダム) is an earthfill dam located in Kagoshima Prefecture in Japan. The dam is used for irrigation and water supply. The catchment area of the dam is 7.1 km^{2}. Its surface area is about 18 ha when full and can store 1,220 thousand cubic meters of water. The construction of the dam was started in 1979 and completed in 1987.

== See also ==
- List of dams in Japan
