= Tobu Dam =

Dam in Kagoshima Prefecture, Japan

- Location within Japan
- Official name: 東部ダム
- Location: Kagoshima Prefecture, Japan
- Coordinates: 27°41′55″N 128°57′30″E
- Construction began: 1969
- Opening date: 1970

Dam and spillways
- Height: 19 m (62 ft)
- Length: 54 m (177 ft)

Reservoir
- Total capacity: 153,000 m^{3} (5,400,000 cu ft)
- Catchment area: 1 km^{2} (0.39 sq mi)
- Surface area: 6 hectares (15 acres)

Tobu Dam (Japanese: 東部ダム) is an earthfill dam located in Kagoshima Prefecture in Japan. The dam is used for irrigation and water supply. The catchment area of the dam is 1 km^{2}. The dam impounds about 6 ha of land when full and can store 153 thousand cubic meters of water. The construction of the dam was started in 1969 and completed in 1970.

== See also ==
- List of dams in Japan
