= Kinpo Dam =

Dam in Kagoshima Prefecture, Japan

- Location within Japan
- Official name: 金峰ダム
- Location: Kagoshima Prefecture, Japan
- Coordinates: 31°27′13″N 130°23′55″E
- Construction began: 1987
- Opening date: 2003

Dam and spillways
- Height: 57.9 m (190 ft)
- Length: 230 m (750 ft)

Reservoir
- Total capacity: 2570 thousand cubic meters
- Catchment area: 13.9 sq. km
- Surface area: 15 hectares

Kinpo Dam (Japanese: 金峰ダム) is a rockfill dam located in Kagoshima Prefecture in Japan. The dam is used for irrigation. The catchment area of the dam is 13.9 km^{2}. The dam's surface area stretches to about 15 ha when full, storing 2,570 thousand cubic meters of water. The construction of the dam was started in 1987 and completed in 2003.

== See also ==
- List of dams in Japan
