= Tsuruda Dam =

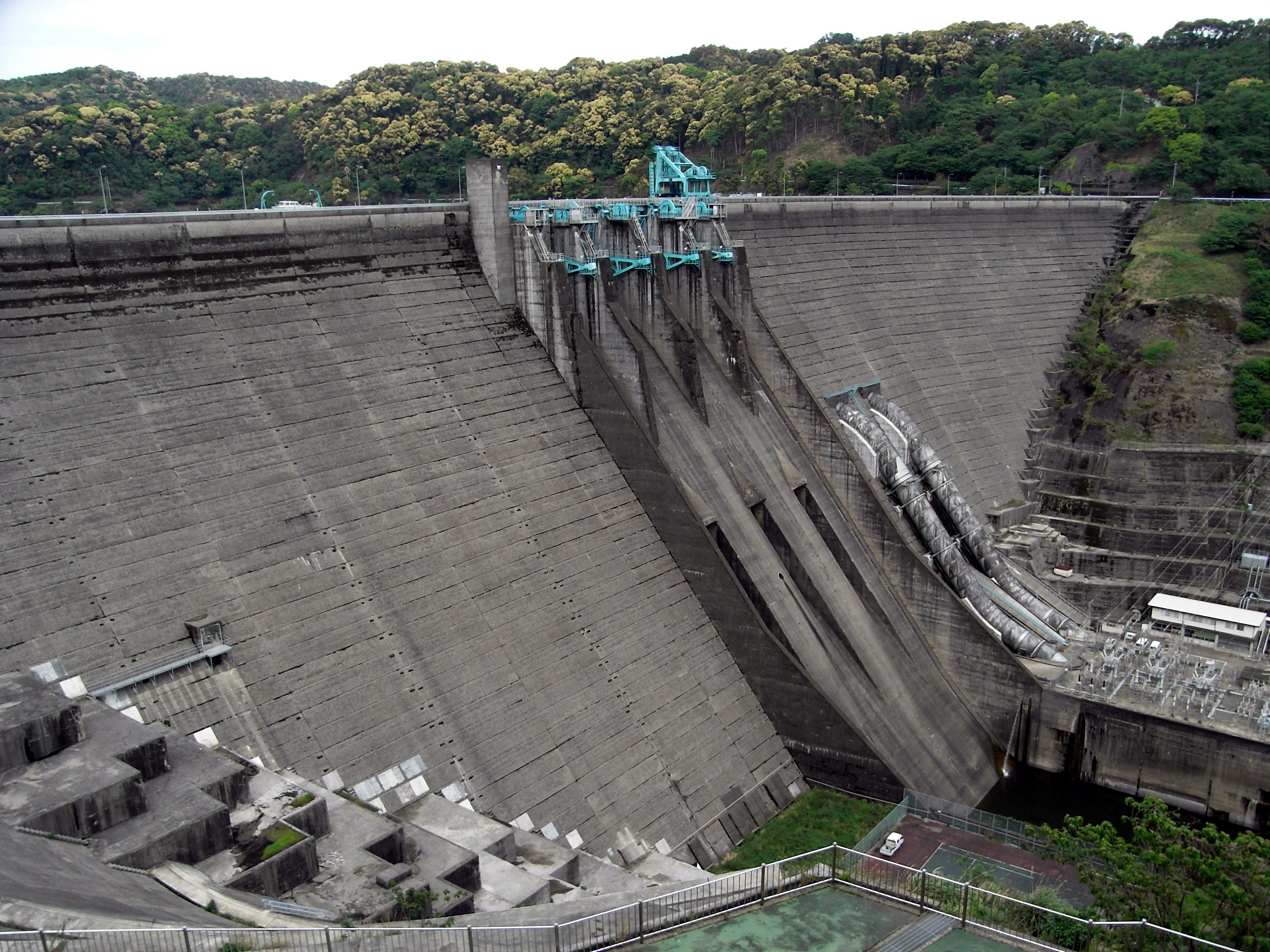
- Interactive map of Tsuruda Dam
- Location: Kagoshima Prefecture, Japan

Tsuruda Dam is a dam in Kagoshima Prefecture, Japan, completed in 1965. It is a 117.5 meter high gravity concrete dam,
