= Kihoku Dam =

Dam in Kagoshima Prefecture, Japan

- Location within Japan
- Official name: 輝北ダム
- Location: Kagoshima Prefecture, Japan
- Coordinates: 31°32′54″N 130°54′02″E
- Construction began: 1979
- Opening date: 2005

Dam and spillways
- Height: 41.9 m (137 ft)
- Length: 114 m (374 ft)

Reservoir
- Total capacity: 8200 thousand cubic meters
- Surface area: 72 hectares

Kihoku Dam (Japanese: 輝北ダム) is a gravity dam in Kagoshima Prefecture in Japan. The dam is used for irrigation. The dam's surface area stretches to about 72 ha when full and can store 8200 thousand cubic meters of water. The construction of the dam was started on 1979 and completed in 2005.

== See also ==
- List of dams in Japan
