= Take Dam =

Dam in Kagoshima Prefecture, Japan

- Location within Japan
- Official name: 嶽ダム（再）
- Location: Kagoshima Prefecture, Japan
- Coordinates: 32°1′19″N 130°17′21″E
- Construction began: 1984
- Opening date: 2003

Dam and spillways
- Height: 29.7 m (97 ft)
- Length: 163.8 m (537 ft)

Reservoir
- Total capacity: 923,000 m^{3} (32,600,000 cu ft)
- Catchment area: 2 km^{2} (0.77 sq mi)
- Surface area: 9 hectares (22 acres)

Take Dam (Japanese: 嶽ダム（再）) is an earthfill dam located in Kagoshima Prefecture in Japan. The dam is used for irrigation. The catchment area of the dam is 2 km^{2}. The dam impounds about 9 ha of land when full and can store 923 thousand cubic meters of water. The construction of the dam started in 1984. It was completed in 2003.

== See also ==
- List of dams in Japan
