= Arase Dam =

Dam in Kagoshima Prefecture, Japan

- Location within Japan
- Interactive map of Arase Dam
- Official name: 荒瀬ダム
- Location: Kagoshima Prefecture, Japan
- Coordinates: 31°20′18″N 131°0′41″E
- Construction began: 1989
- Opening date: 2018

Dam and spillways
- Height: 65.6 m (215 ft)
- Length: 407.5 m (1,337 ft)

Reservoir
- Total capacity: 2580 thousand cubic meters
- Catchment area: 7.9 sq. km
- Surface area: 15 hectares

Arase Dam (Japanese: 荒瀬ダム) is a rockfill dam located in Kagoshima Prefecture in Japan. The dam is used for irrigation. The catchment area of the dam is 7.9 km^{2}. The surface area of the dam is about 15 ha when full. It can store 2,580 thousand cubic meters of water. The construction of the dam started in 1989 and was completed in 2018.

== See also ==
- List of dams in Japan
