= Shinrei Dam =

Dam in Kagoshima Prefecture, Japan

- Location within Japan
- Official name: 神嶺ダム
- Location: Kagoshima Prefecture, Japan
- Coordinates: 27°45′08″N 128°59′50″E
- Construction began: 1972
- Opening date: 1981

Dam and spillways
- Height: 33.8 m (111 ft)
- Length: 170 m (560 ft)

Reservoir
- Total capacity: 808,000 m^{3} (28,500,000 cu ft)
- Catchment area: 3.4 km^{2} (1.3 sq mi)
- Surface area: 9 hectares (22 acres)

Shinrei Dam (Japanese: 神嶺ダム) is an earthfill dam located in Kagoshima Prefecture in Japan. The dam is used for irrigation and water supply. The catchment area of the dam is 3.4 km^{2}. At full storage, the dam's surface area stretches to about 9 ha and can hold 808 thousand cubic meters of water. The construction of the dam was started in 1972 and completed in 1981.

== See also ==
- List of dams in Japan
