= Takamatsu Dam =

Dam in Kagoshima Prefecture, Japan

- Location within Japan
- Official name: 高松ダム
- Location: Kagoshima Prefecture, Japan
- Coordinates: 32°1′25″N 130°14′52″E
- Opening date: 1969

Dam and spillways
- Height: 37 m (121 ft)
- Length: 60 m (200 ft)

Reservoir
- Total capacity: 1,200,000 m^{3} (42,000,000 cu ft)
- Catchment area: 22.9 km^{2} (8.8 sq mi)
- Surface area: 13 hectares (32 acres)

Takamatsu Dam (Japanese: 高松ダム) is a gravity dam located in Kagoshima Prefecture in Japan. The dam is used for flood control. The catchment area of the dam is 22.9 km^{2}. The dam surface area is about 13 ha when full and can store 1200 thousand cubic meters of water. The construction of the dam was completed in 1969.

== See also ==
- List of dams in Japan
