= Odate Dam =

Dam in Kagoshima Prefecture, Japan

- Location within Japan
- Official name: 尾立ダム
- Location: Kagoshima Prefecture, Japan
- Coordinates: 30°20′15″N 130°35′30″E
- Construction began: 1959
- Opening date: 1963

Dam and spillways
- Height: 53.5 m (176 ft)
- Length: 137.9 m (452 ft)

Reservoir
- Total capacity: 2,265,000 m^{3} (80,000,000 cu ft)
- Catchment area: 92.5 km^{2} (35.7 sq mi)
- Surface area: 13 hectares (32 acres)

Odate Dam (Japanese: 尾立ダム) is an arch dam located in Kagoshima Prefecture in Japan. The dam is used for power production. The catchment area of the dam is 92.5 km^{2}. At its maximum storage capacity, the dam's surface area is about 13 ha, and can store 2,265 thousand cubic meters of water. The construction of the dam was started on 1959 and completed in 1963.

== See also ==
- List of dams in Japan
