= Takakuma Dam =

Dam in Kagoshima Prefecture, Japan

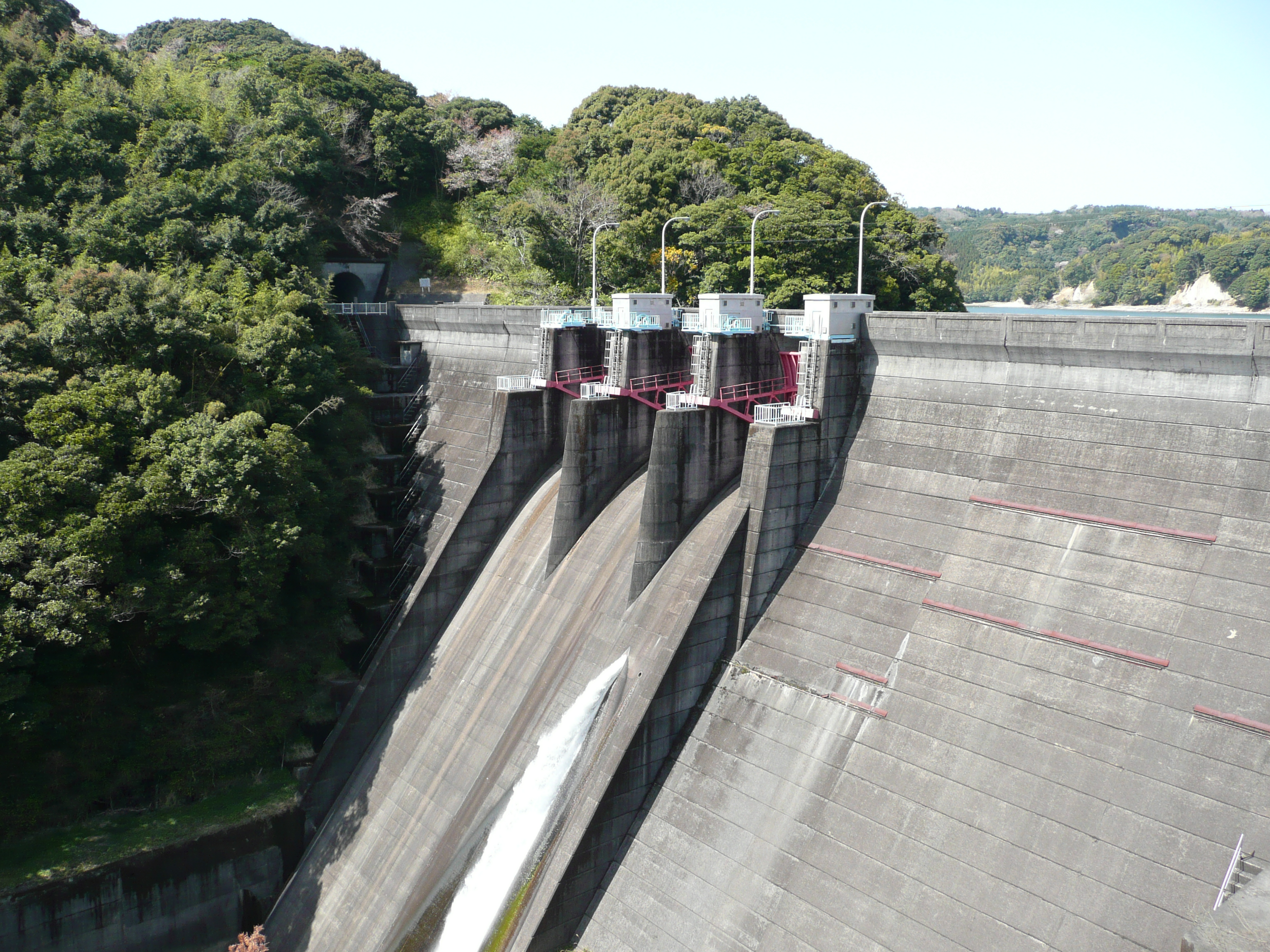

- Location within Japan
- Official name: 高隈ダム
- Location: Kagoshima Prefecture, Japan
- Coordinates: 31°30′30″N 130°51′34″E
- Opening date: 1967

Dam and spillways
- Height: 47 m (154 ft)
- Length: 136 m (446 ft)

Reservoir
- Total capacity: 13,930,000 m^{3} (492,000,000 cu ft)
- Catchment area: 38.4 km^{2} (14.8 sq mi)
- Surface area: 104 hectares (260 acres)

Takakuma Dam (Japanese: 高隈ダム) is a gravity dam located in Kagoshima Prefecture in Japan. The dam is used for irrigation. The catchment area of the dam is 38.4 km^{2}. The surface area of the dam is about 104 ha when full and can store 13,930 thousand cubic meters of water. The construction of the dam was completed in 1967.

== See also ==
- List of dams in Japan
