= Kawanabe Dam =

Coordinates: 31°26′42″N 130°26′44″E

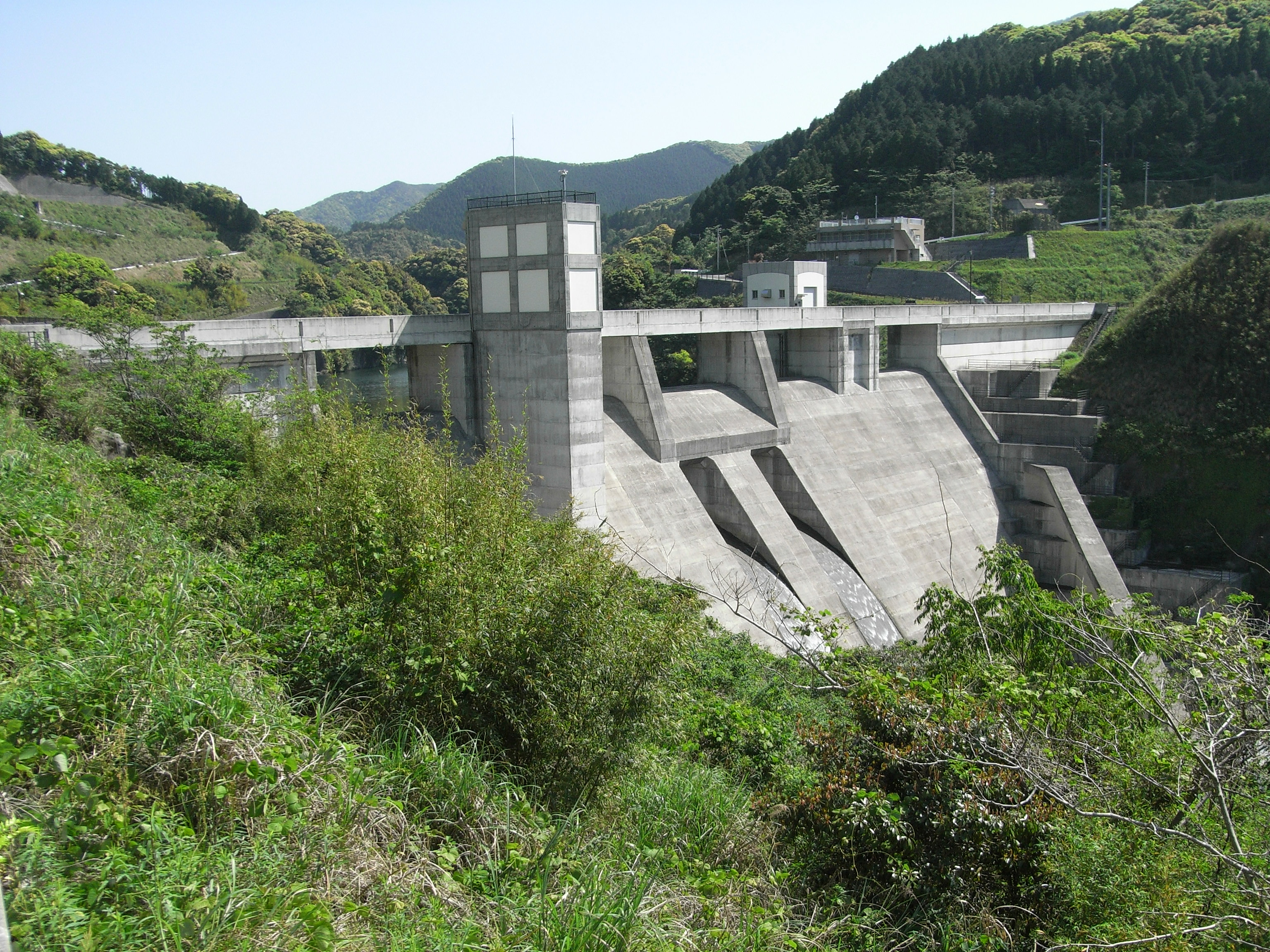
- Interactive map of Kawanabe Dam
- Official name: 川辺ダム
- Location: Kagoshima Prefecture, Japan
- Construction began: 1981
- Opening date: 2002

Dam and spillways
- Type of dam: Gravity dam
- Height: 53.5 m (176 ft)
- Length: 147 m (482 ft)
- Dam volume: 103,000 m^{3}

Reservoir
- Total capacity: 2,920,000 m^{3}
- Catchment area: 30.2 km^{2}
- Surface area: 23 ha

Kawanabe Dam (Japanese: 川辺ダム) is a gravity dam in Kagoshima Prefecture, Japan, completed in 2002.
