= Kagoshima graben =

- Map showing Kagoshima graben (red) and its caldera (violet) with active volcanoes within graben as symbols
- Coordinates: 31.4°N 130.7°E
- Volcanic zone: Kagoshima graben
- Last eruption: 2026

The Kagoshima graben is a large and complex volcano-tectonic graben located on the island of Kyushu in southern Japan and under the northeast East China Sea. It is associated with the subduction of the Philippine Sea plate beneath the Eurasia plate and contains volcanic caldera responsible for some of the largest eruptions in the Holocene and the most currently active volcano in Japan, Sakurajima.

== Geology ==
It was not until 1986 that the analogy of a volcano-tectonic graben was raised in the geological literature between the Kagoshima graben and similar structures like the Taupō Rift in New Zealand and Lake Toba in Indonesia which also contain Quaternary caldera. The Kagoshima graben is at the northeast end of the Ryukyu Arc of volcanoes and is related to the tectonics that created the Okinawa Trough which is a back-arc basin.

The island chain that is today's Japan has been twisted during the collision of at least three tectonic plates over the last 20 million years. As a result in the southern region of Ksushu below the southwest Japan arc of volcanoes seen on Honshu, the major geological structures have been distorted into bends. The southern half of Kyushu island consists of stacked thrust sheets composed predominantly of Jurassic to Palaeogene clastic rocks. The Kagoshima graben is a much younger geological structure at the far south of Ksushu and accordingly has to its north the geological formations of the Hitoyoshi Bend, to its northwest the Hokusatsu Bend and to its northeast the formations of the Nojiri Bend.

The Ryukyu Arc has been formed by the subduction of the Philippine Sea plate beneath the Eurasia plate. At the Kagoshima graben the direction of relative convergence is about N45°W and its rate is between 4 and 5 cm/year (1.6 and 2.0 in/year). The complexity increases as the Philippine Sea plate is here subducting under the smaller Okinawa plate which is colliding with the Amur plate portion of the Eurasia plate. The larger Pacific plate is subducting under both of these. Crustal extension started at about 13 million years ago at the southern end of Kyushu and has with northwards migration since reached the middle part of Kyushu at the level of Beppu Bay, where it is still active today. At its northern end is the Kagoshima graben whose downfaulting started about 2.9 million years ago after the late Pliocene.

With regard to the major tectonic faults, in the northern Ryukyu Arc the Amami-Kagoshima Tectonic Line aligns with the southern aspects of the Kagoshima graben. The Kyushu portion of the Median Tectonic Line commences to the northwest of the Kagoshima graben and the Nobeoka Tectonic Line, a regional thrust, commences on the eastern aspect of the Kagoshima Bay and runs to the northeast of the graben.

== Eruptions ==
Holocene active volcanoes include Sakurajima, the most currently active in Japan, Shinmoedake Takachiho-no-mine, Mount Kaimon, Mount Iō (Iōjima) and Inamura-dake. The Kamo volcanic field had two late Holocene eruptions. Please see the respective articles for these volcanoes eruption history.

The major caldera formed by large eruptions are younger than 600,000 years, and are from south to north Kikai Caldera, Ata South Caldera, Ata North Caldera, Aira Caldera, and at its northern end the Kakuto and Kobayashi caldera, which are sometimes combined as the Kakuto volcanic centre. The Kakuto caldera formed in an eruption about 330,000 years ago and has been infilled since with many eruptions from subsequent stratovolcanoes. Sub-caldera with notable holocene eruptions include the Wakamiko sub-caldera of Aira caldera and the Ikeda sub-caldera of Ata South Caldera. Tephras from these largest eruptions have been found up to 600 km (370 mi) to the north in Japan as southwesterly winds dominate.

Summary of Holocene eruptions of at least VEI 5 in Kagoshima graben
Start Date	Years before 1950 (BP)	VEI	DRE volume (km^{3})	Tephra volume (km^{3})	Comment
November 3, 1471	479	5	0.53	0.49	Aira caldera. Explosive (P3 tephra) with effusive eruption of Bunmei lava possibly less than VEI 5 ending on or after October 8, 1476.
740 ± 75 BCE	2690 ± 75	5	5	-	Ikeda sub-caldera of Ata South Caldera, Tephra layer Ikp
5350 BCE	7300	7	500	-	Akahoya eruption of Kikai caldera. Produced Koya (Take-shima) pyroclastic flow (K-Ky).
6100 ± 1000 BCE	8050 ± 1000	6	-	12	Wakamiko sub-caldera of Aira caldera
27838 ± 300 BCE	29788 ± 300	7	800	400	Aira caldera, AT tephra, Osumi pumice
93050 BCE	95000	6	130	-	Tozurahama eruption of Kikai caldera. Produced Nagase ignimbrite (K-Ns)
138050 BCE	140000	6	130	-	Koabi eruption of Kikai caldera Produced Koabi ignimbrite (K-ab).
