= Kamo volcanic field =

Volcanic field in Japan

Kamo Volcanic Field
- Kamō volcanic field
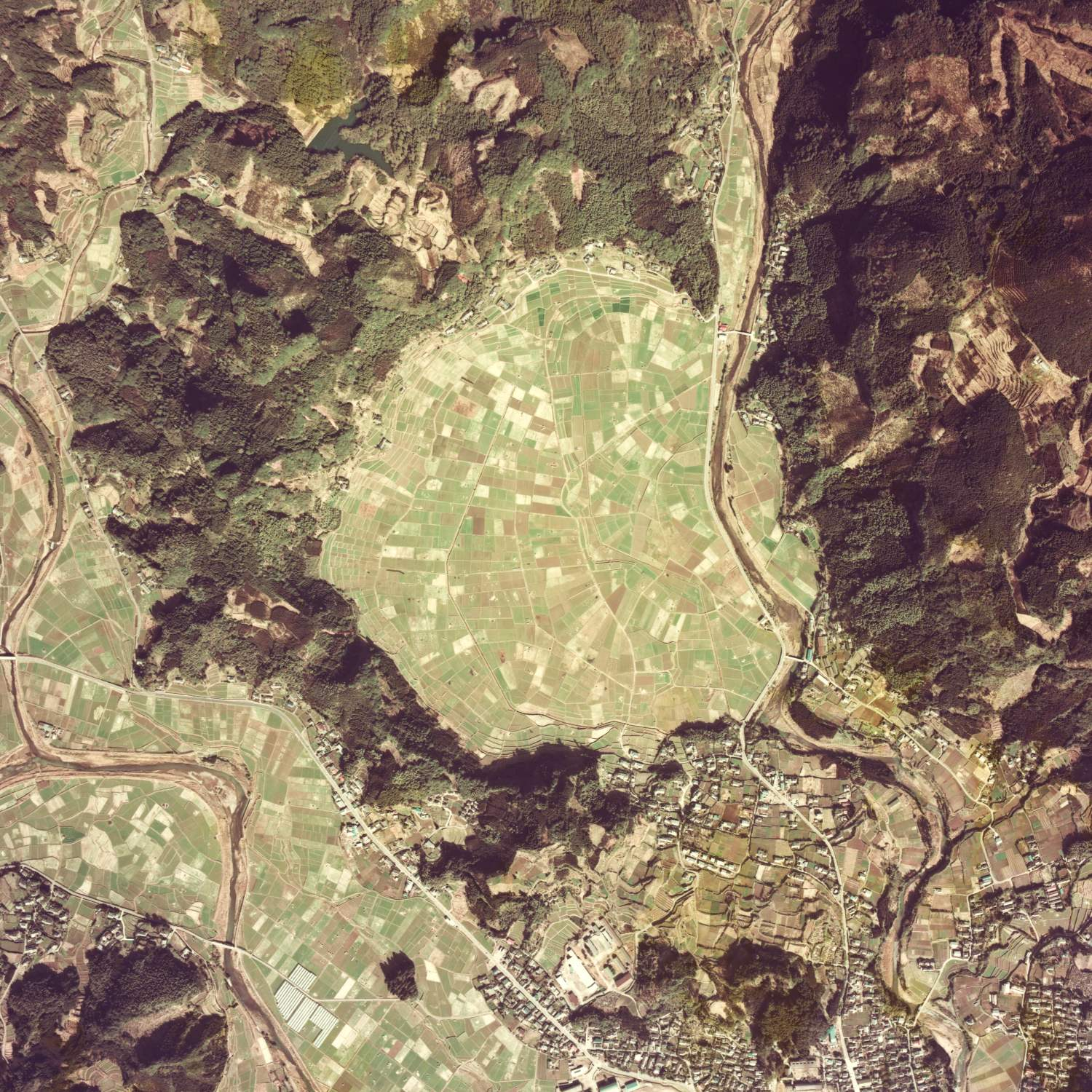
- Aerial view of Yonemaru Maar

Highest point
- Elevation: 275.5 m (904 ft)
- Coordinates: 31.771°N 130.592°E

Geography
- Location within Japan
- Map showing Kamo volcanic field and its two maars (red) and its volcanic cone as a symbol

Geology
- Rock age: Pleistocene to Holocene 0.100–0.006 Ma
- Mountain type: Volcanic field
- Rock type: Basalt
- Last eruption: c. 6200 BCE

The Kamo volcanic field (Kamō volcanic field) is a monogenetic volcanic field in southern Kyushu, Japan. It is within the Kagoshima graben and contains the Yonemaru and Sumiyoshiike maars and the Aojiki basaltic volcanic cone. It last erupted about 6200 BCE, and is regarded as potentially active.

== Geography ==
The volcanic field is located near Kamō, Kagoshima about 10 km (6.2 mi) to the northeast of the Aira Caldera. Three now extinct small volcanoes in the northwest area of Aira city, Kagoshima Prefecture make up the volcanic field.

== Geology ==
The Kamo volcanic field is a monogenetic volcanic fields in the middle portion and near the northern edge the Kagoshima graben which is a complex volcano-tectonic graben generated by the rotational and subduction processes involved in the collision of the Philippine Sea plate, the Okinawa plate, the Amur plate portion of the Eurasia plate and the Pacific plate. Tephra from the two maar deposits arose from phreatomagmatic eruptions at a time of high sea level stand at the northern edge of the Kagoshima graben. The eruptives are in the tholeiitic magma series and are believed to have evolved with mixing from a basaltic magma chamber at a depth of about 24 km (15 mi). The composition of the Aojiki scoria cone suggests magma mixing at shallower depth in its formation than the magma formation that preceded the eruption of the two maars.

=== Features ===
==== Aojiki cone ====
Aojiki cone was formed in a sequence of three phases about 100,000 years ago in the late holocene. The resulting ovoid volcano has a height of 275.5 m (904 ft) above sea level, being about 150 m (490 ft) high above the surrounding land and up to 1.5 km (0.93 mi) in diameter. The Hikiyama tephra (Ao-Hk, AIT) is a scoria deposit from an initial phreatomagmatic eruption. This is overlaid by the ignimbrite from the Ata Caldera eruption of about 100,000 years ago (giving a date), which is then overlaid by the eruption of the Aojiki lava flow and the final phase of eruption was scoria from an inner cone vent.

==== Sumiyoshiike maar ====
The Sumiyoshiike maar deposit of eruptive volume of 0.004 km^{3} (0.00096 cu mi) DRE came next about 8200 years ago in a VEI 2 eruption. Sumiyoshiike (means small lake) has a diameter of about 0.5 km (0.31 mi), and is a lake about 30 m (98 ft) deep. There is a campsite nearby.

==== Yonemaru maar ====
Yonemaru (means circular rice field), has a diameter of 1 km (0.62 mi) and is now in-filled with alluvial layers making an area of flat agricultural land.. Its formation eruption followed about 100 years later to that of Sumiyoshiike maar in a VEI 3 eruption of 0.016 km^{3} (0.0038 cu mi) DRE. There are hot springs nearby.

== Gallery ==
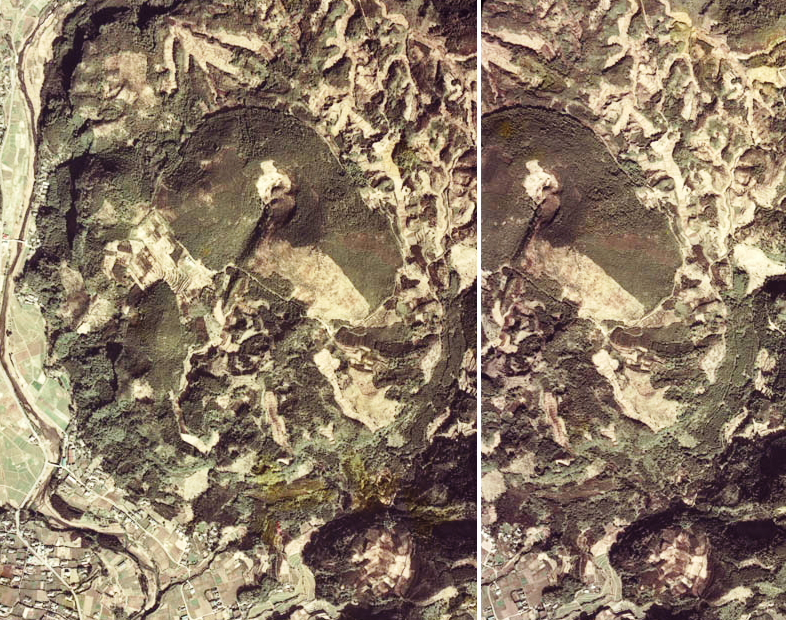
Aerial view Aojiki cone

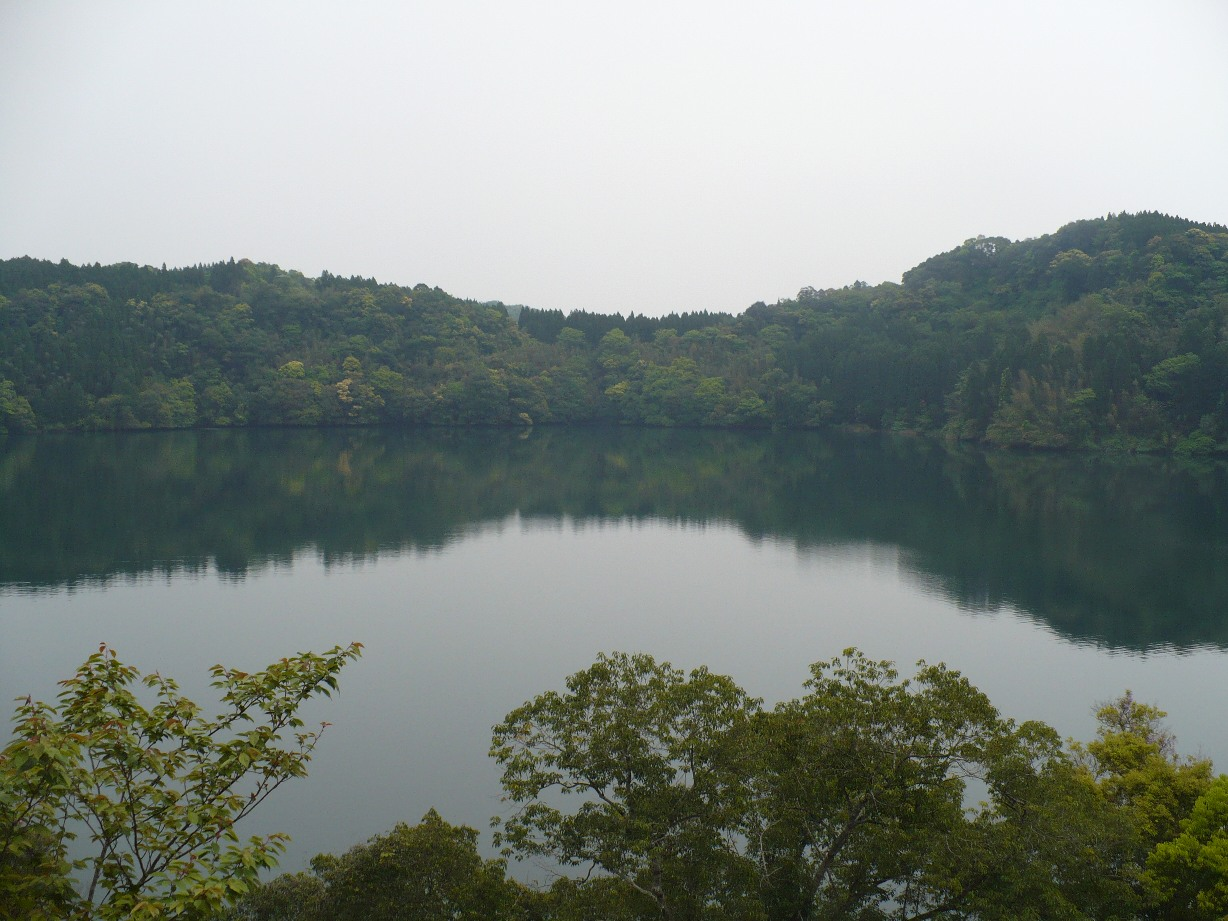
Sumiyoshiike maar

Samples (red) from all three volcanoes are basaltic in composition
