= Aira Caldera =

Large flooded coastal volcanic caldera in Japan

Aira
- 姶良カルデラ
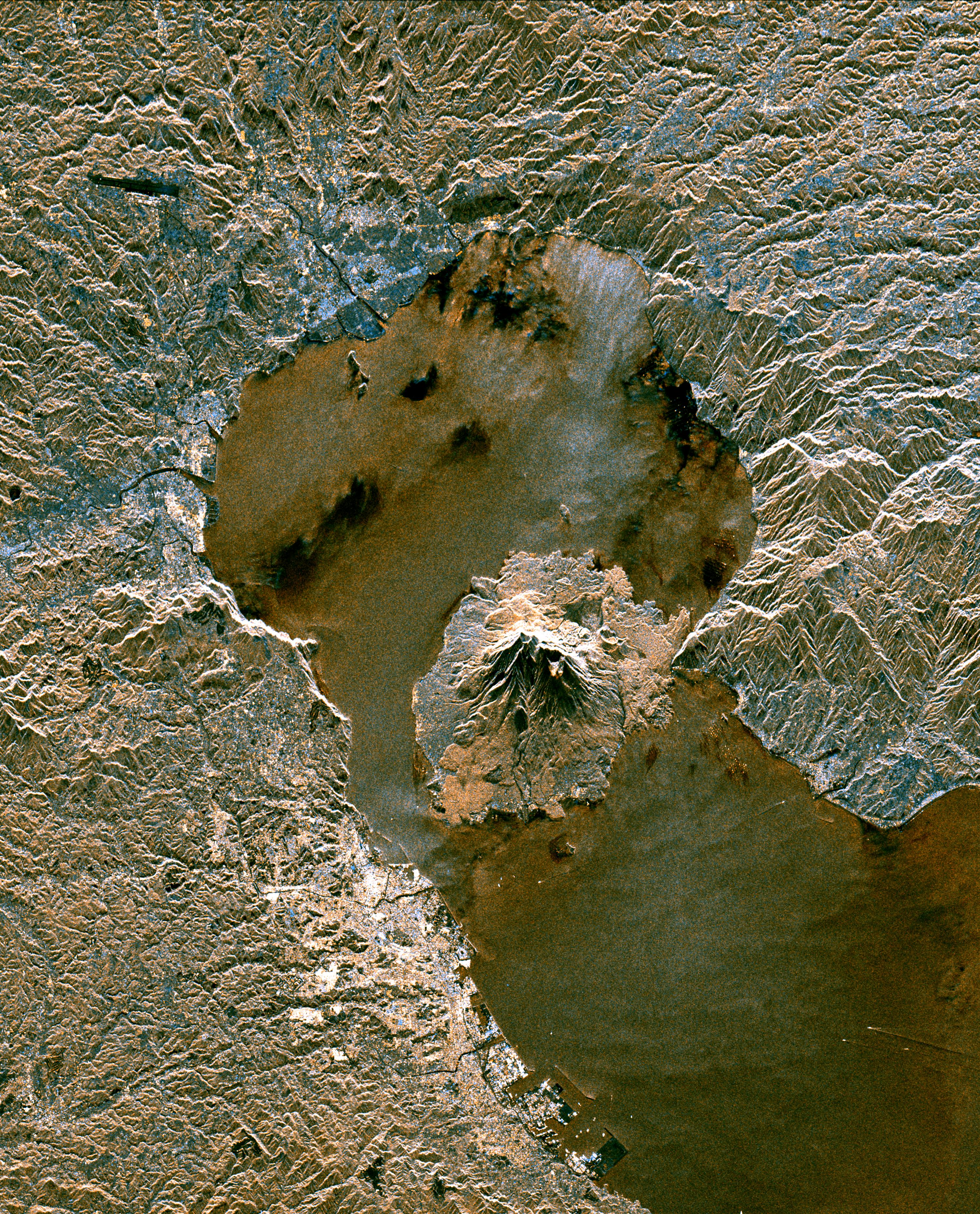
- Radar image from a Space Shuttle of Aira Caldera in 1999, with Sakurajima in the bay formed by the caldera

Highest point
- Peak: Sakurajima
- Elevation: 1,117 m (3,665 ft)
- Coordinates: 31°39′00″N 130°42′00″E

Geography
- Location within Japan
- Map showing Aria caldera (red), Kagoshima graben (black) , other calderas (violet), and active volcanoes as symbols
- Location: Kagoshima, Japan
- Geological Subdivisions: Wakamiko Caldera, Mount Sakurajima

Geology
- Rock age: 29,428–30,148 years calibrated before present
- Mountain type(s): Caldera; Somma volcano
- Last eruption: 1955 to present

Aira Caldera is a gigantic volcanic caldera located on the southern end of Kyushu, Japan. It is believed to have been formed about 30,000 years ago with a succession of pyroclastic surges. It is currently the place of residence to over 900,000 people. The shores of Aira Caldera have rare flora and fauna, including Japanese bay tree and Japanese black pine. The caldera contains the active Mount Sakurajima.

Aira Caldera has an underlying magma chamber that connects with the Kirishima magmatic system. This has enabled magma from the caldera to feed into Sakurajima stratovolcano, causing it to expand over time. Thus, Sakurajima has caused a series of disasters such as the eruption in 1914 which killed 58 people and sank the magma chamber by 60 cm (24 in).

== History ==
=== Location ===
Aira caldera is located on Kyushu, the southernmost island of Japan. In the caldera, Sakurajima stratovolcano peaks at 1,117 m (3,665 ft).

The colossal Ito eruption forming the Aira Caldera occurred approximately 30,000 years ago. It resulted in tephra and ignimbrite from a vast amount of magma affecting the nearby land. The eruption also aided in the formation of the 200-metre-deep (660 ft) Kagoshima Bay, which formed after sea water entered the area.

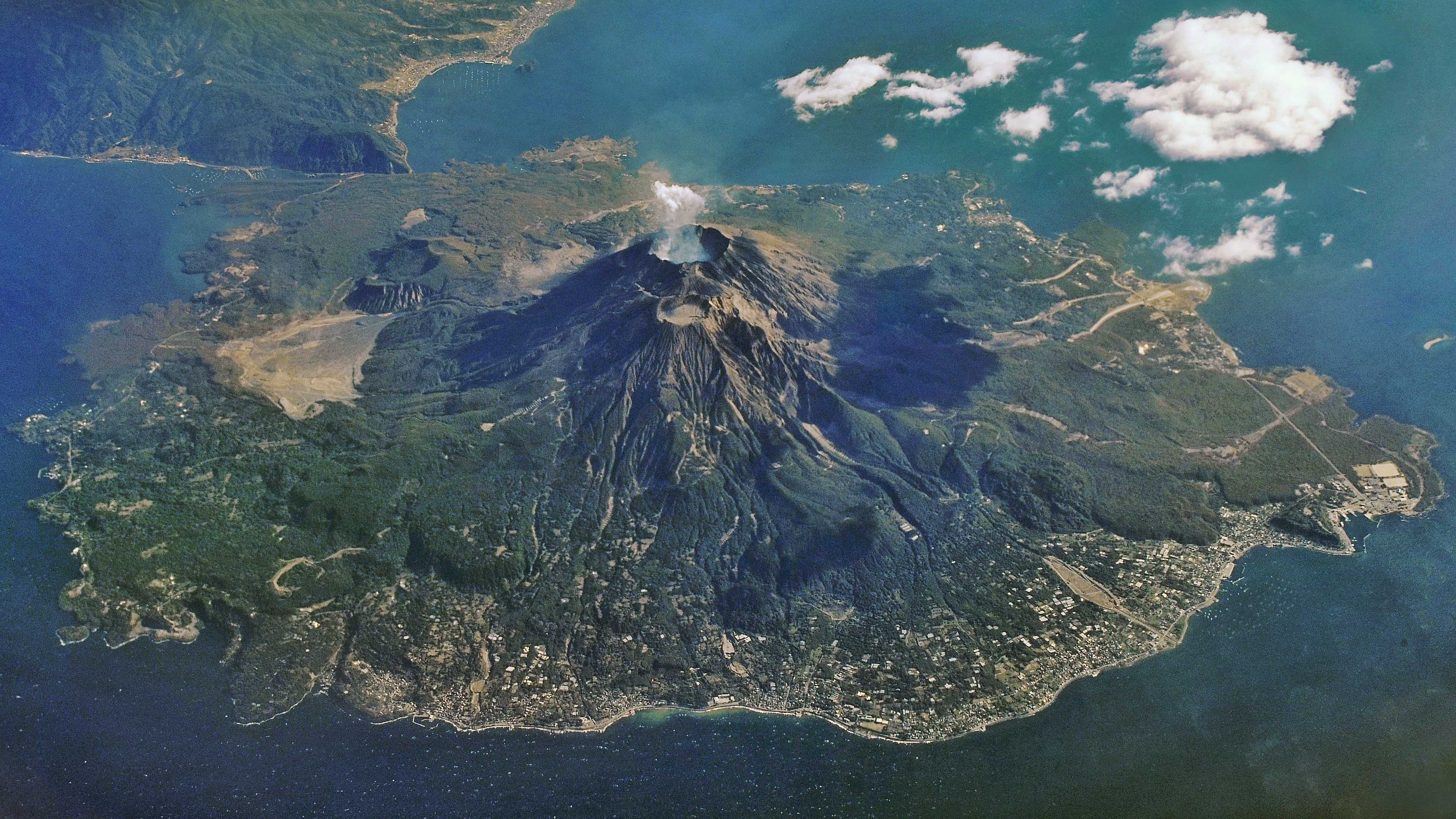
Sakurajima, the highest point of the Aira caldera

Within the Aira caldera, in the northern, inner-most part of Kagoshima Bay, northeast of the currently active Sakurajima is the Wakamiko sub caldera, which has geothermal activity, and is also considered to have formed at the time of the Ito eruption.

Aira caldera is surrounded by the major city of Kagoshima which has a population of more than 900,000. Residents do not mind small eruptions because they have measures in place for protection. For example, school students are required to wear hard helmets for protection against falling debris. Additionally, a disaster-prevention system with the world's best high-tech volcanic monitory system was put in place. The caldera is now closely monitored by the Sakurajima Volcano Research Centre, which is a part of the University of Kyoto and Disaster Prevention Research Institute. This ensures the safety of the residents and provides a peaceful coexistence with the people of Kagoshima and the active caldera.

=== Geological background ===
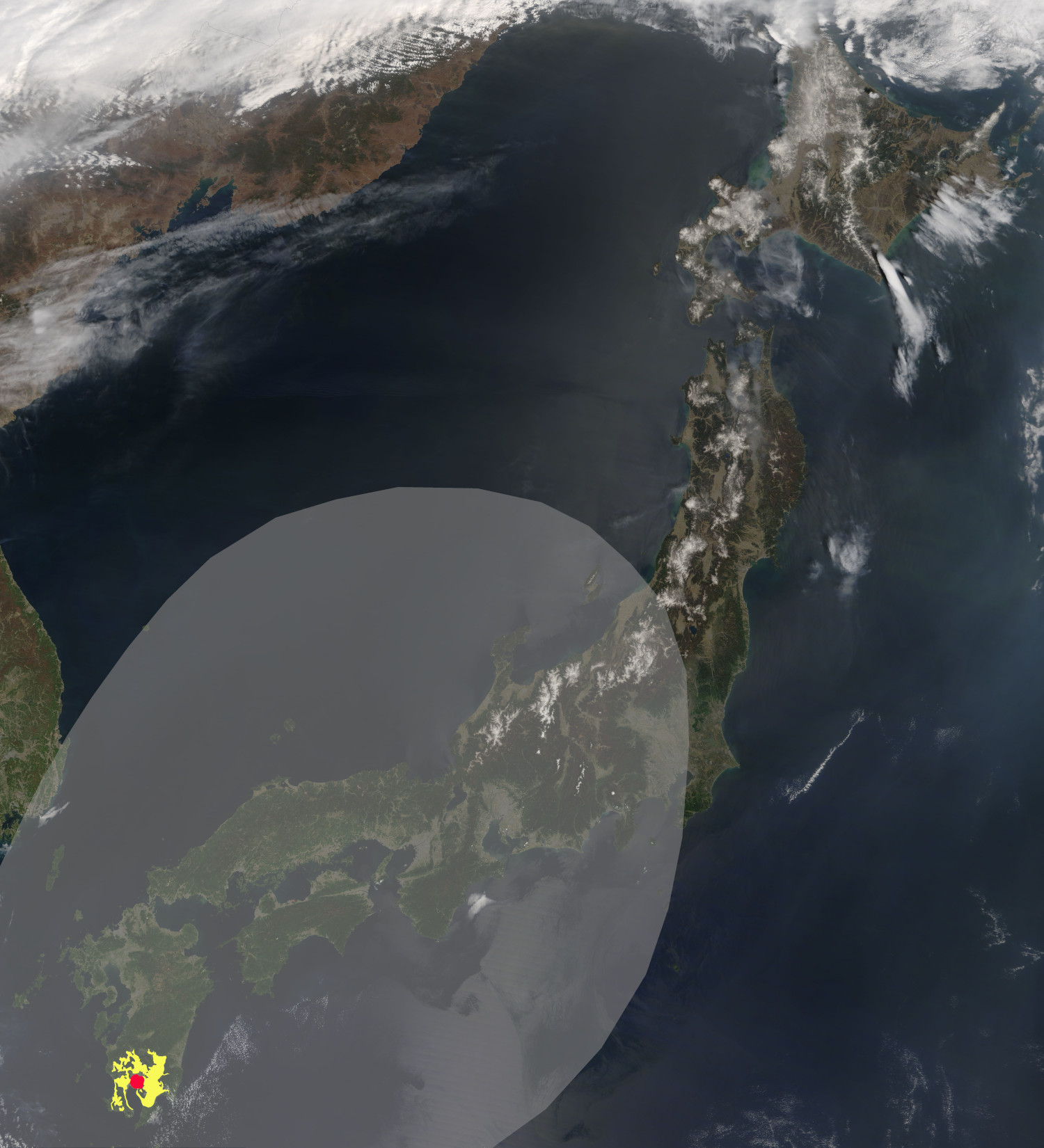
Photo of present Japan with Aira Caldera's (red) Ito eruption area of immediate impact with approximate distribution 10cm or more of tephra (ash) in white shading and ignimbrite (yellow) from the symmetrical pyroclastic flow

Aira Caldera is almost rectangular in shape related to local faulting and was created in a series of large-scale of pyroclastic surges that contributed to the Shirasu-Daichi pyroclastic plateau, with the last now dated to 29,428 to 30,148 years calibrated before present. The eruption formed a caldera that was 17 km (11 mi) by 23 km (14 mi). Aira Caldera is one of a series of volcanic complexes in the Kagoshima graben, which has been postulated to extend northward from the undersea Kikai Caldera to the Ata South Caldera, Ata North Caldera (see Ata Caldera), Aira Caldera associated with Kagoshima Bay, and through past to the Kirishima Volcano Group. The Mount Kirishima group of stratovolcanoes has Shinmoedake as its most famous and active member. This alignment was first noted in the 1940s. The tectonic processes are rather complex in this region, where the Okinawa Plate is colliding with the Amur Plate and the Pacific Plate is subducting under both.

The formation of Aira Caldera started with a Plinian pumice eruption of the Osumi pumice from a vent near where Sakurajima is now and was quickly followed by an oxidised Tsumaya pyroclastic flow. It is likely that subsequent eruptions in this series were at vents in what has been termed the Wakamiko caldera to the northwest. Basement rock fragments and pumiceous materials from a massive explosion formed the Ito pyroclastic flow, which deposited more than 800 km^{3} (190 cu mi) of Ito Ignimbrite (known as "Shirasu" locally) and 300 km^{3} (72 cu mi) of Aira-Tn Tephra in volume. Within the constraints that much of the caldera is under the sea, the reason for the large vent area is because the caldera erupted well over earlier estimates of 140 km^{3} (34 cu mi) of magma in a short amount of time. The caldera is known for its gravitational anomalies, which are associated with a funnel-like shape in the strata.

The structure of the caldera seemed unique in early work as it was different from the then-typical Valles-type Caldera whose defining characteristics include a Valles-type ring fracture which acts as a channel for such large-scale pyroclastic flows. Such diffuse non-directional pyroclastic flows, overwhelming the local landscape, have now also been described in New Zealand, for example in the Hatepe eruption.

Rare minerals exist on Kagoshima Bay's seabed with hydrothermal vents including volcanic chimneys. The minerals include stibnite, realgar, orpiment, and pyrite and there are concentrations of mercury, antimony, and arsenic. Some of the hydrothermal fluid-venting chimneys have unique mineralogy, of kerolite and hydrated talc with lesser amounts of dolomite and magnesite, amorphous silica, and stibnite. Petroleum seeps exist.

==== Local Impact of Ito eruption ====
Before the initial caldera forming eruption there was a wide and shallow basin of nearly the same size as the present Aira Caldera occupying the northern end of Kagoshima Bay with an east–west orientation. The basin is separated from the rest of the bay by a ridge with heights 300 m (980 ft) to 500 m (1,600 ft) above sea level. The topography encompasses the outline of an older caldera, suggesting there were pyroclastic flows that pre-dated the formation of present-day Aira Caldera.

The first phase of activity resulted from injection of mafic magmas that destabilized the stored rhyolite magma and was the mainly homogeneous Osumi Pumice Fall (named because the pumice fall extended across the Ōsumi Peninsula to the south east). Above the Osumi pumice fall deposit, is the second phase Tsumaya pyroclastic flow deposit which is wholly confined within the pre-Aira basin. The Tsumaya pyroclastic flow buried the pre-Aira topography such as box canyons (formed by older pyroclastic flow deposits). The maximum thickness in the caldera is 130 m (430 ft) in the Kokubu area with the average thickness being 30 m (98 ft) or less. The Tsumaya pyroclastic flow consists of a "pale pinkish brown glass matrix containing a small amount of pumice and lithic fragments", consistent with the Osumi pumice fall and the Tsumaya pyroclastic flow occurring from the same vent. There was only a very short period between the Tsumaya pyroclastic flow and the formation of the present caldera in the Ito eruption.

In contrast, the Ito pyroclastic flow extends outside the basin as well as occupying inside the basin. The Aira-Tn tephra falls from this eruption were up to 80 cm (31 in) thick in the southeast, and this and Ito Ignimbrite up to 160 m (520 ft) thick, are the most significant pyroclastic deposits. The depth of the ash fall was over 32 cm (13 in) on Kyushu and southern Honshu, approximately 10 cm (3.9 in) of ash on the Kantō Plain (Tokyo) and around 4 cm (1.6 in) for much of Japan.

== Volcanic activity ==
=== Relationship between Aira and Kirishima magmatic systems ===
Aira caldera is one of the most active and hazardous calderas in the world. It is connected by the collapse structure of the Kagoshima graben to the Kirishima volcanoes, a group of active volcanoes beyond the north end of Aira caldera. One of these volcanoes, Shinmoedake, has produced two strong magmato-phreatic eruptions, separated by almost 300 years. Minor phreatic activity at Shinmoedake starting in August 2008 was not initially associated with a pattern of ground deformation. Starting in December 2009, active inflation before the outbreak became detectable consistent with, in due course, the accumulation of approximately 19.24×10^{6} m^{3} (6.8×10^{8} cu ft) of magma. A series of sub-plinian events then occurred from 19 to the 31 January 2011. The first phase (eruption climax) was accompanied by a strong co-eruptive deflation.

Aira Caldera may respond to small eruptions that come from a common reservoir. However, not all the volcanic systems are connected all the time as magma pathways open and close. The connection between Aira and Kirishima represents the clearest example of volcano interconnectivity revealed by geodetic monitoring. The inflation of one volcano can enhance the eruption probability of a neighbouring volcano. The subduction of the Philippine Sea Plate beneath the Eurasian Plate is the reason for the active volcanism.

Aira Caldera and Kirishima's magma storage is linked through underground connections that extend horizontally over tens of kilometers, which is able to be explained through the presence of hotspots. However, the volcanic systems are not always connected since the magma pathways open and close. For example, the Shinmoedake vertical connection was closed for approximately 300 years until reactivation.

The changes in volume for the Aira and Kirishima systems suggest they had different inflation and deflation periods. Between 2009 and 2013, there was evidence of inflation in the Aira system. However, after the 2011 eruption at Kirishima, the Aira system experienced a deflation. This was Aira caldera's only deflation between 2009 and 2013.

== Inflation of Aira Caldera ==
The magma storage underlying Aira Caldera has been feeding into the stratovolcano Sakurajima, expanding over time. However, there have been points in time where the chamber has deflated as a result of eruptions releasing the pressure built which cannot be explained by stress changes. Thus, it has been described as a consequence of magma withdrawing from the Aira system when Kirishima was replenishing. A prime example is the Sakurajima eruption in 1914 (approximately 1.5 km^{3} in volume), which caused the magma chamber to sink 60 cm (24 in). 58 people were killed in the eruption. For this amount of magma to erupt, it would take approximately 130 years for the chamber to refill, according to Dr James Hickey and his co-authors. Dr Hickey stated "These results were made possible by combining data from various monitoring methods and applying them to new numerical modelling techniques, moving away from older modelling methods that have been in use since the 1950s."

Nevertheless, there are continuous measurements of the ground movement that indicate the area is now inflating. Recent GPS deformation measurements, amalgamated with geophysical data and computer modelling, enable the reconstruction of the magma system beneath the caldera. Through this, Dr James Hickey and his co-authors were able to create a depiction of the tunnels beneath the caldera.

They discovered that magma is filling the magma chamber at a faster rate than the Sakurajima volcano erupts. The reservoir is expanding each year as a volume of 14 million m^{3} is supplied to the system. Dr Haruhisa Nakamichi, Associate Professor at the Disaster Prevention Research Institute, Kyoto University, and co-author, said: "It is already passed by 100 years since the 1914 eruption, less than 30 years is left until a next expected big eruption, Kagoshima city office has prepared new evacuation plans from Sakurajima, after experiences of evacuation of the crisis in August 2015."

A group of scientists led by Dr Dominique Remy used synthetic-aperture radar to detect levels of inflation of Aira Caldera over the Kokubu urban district. They observed a change in the pattern of Kokubu's surface. Through a model of the deformation field of the caldera, it is predicted there is "a maximum volume increase of 20–30 million m^{3} between 1995 and 1998." They deduced an inflation of approximately 70 mm (2.8 in) at the centre of the caldera and 40 mm (1.6 in) in the south urban area of Kokubu.

== Flora and fauna ==
The plants near Sakurajima regrow after eruptions. The Japanese bay trees and Japanese black pines are two species which grow furthest away. These plants are able to repopulate; however, they cannot withstand the debris and pumice after an eruption. Eurya japonica and Alnus firma can be found in the middle ground away from the peak. They are able to grow back from an eruption and withstand its destruction more than the vegetation furthest away. Japanese pampas grass (Miscanthus sinensis) and knotweed (Reynoutria japonica) are located closest to the volcano. They respond quickly after an eruption and form a meadow of mosses and lichens during regrowth. Nevertheless, it takes many years for the forest to regrow. This enables observation of the process of ecological succession during each period of recovery following eruptions.

Kagoshima Bay (Kinko Bay) is home to much wildlife, including 1000 different species of fish, a population of dolphins, as well as rare creatures such as the Satsumahaorimushi tube worm.
