= Shirasu-Daichi =

Volcanic plateau in southern Kyūshū, Japan

Shirasu-Daichi シラス台地
- Volcanic plateau
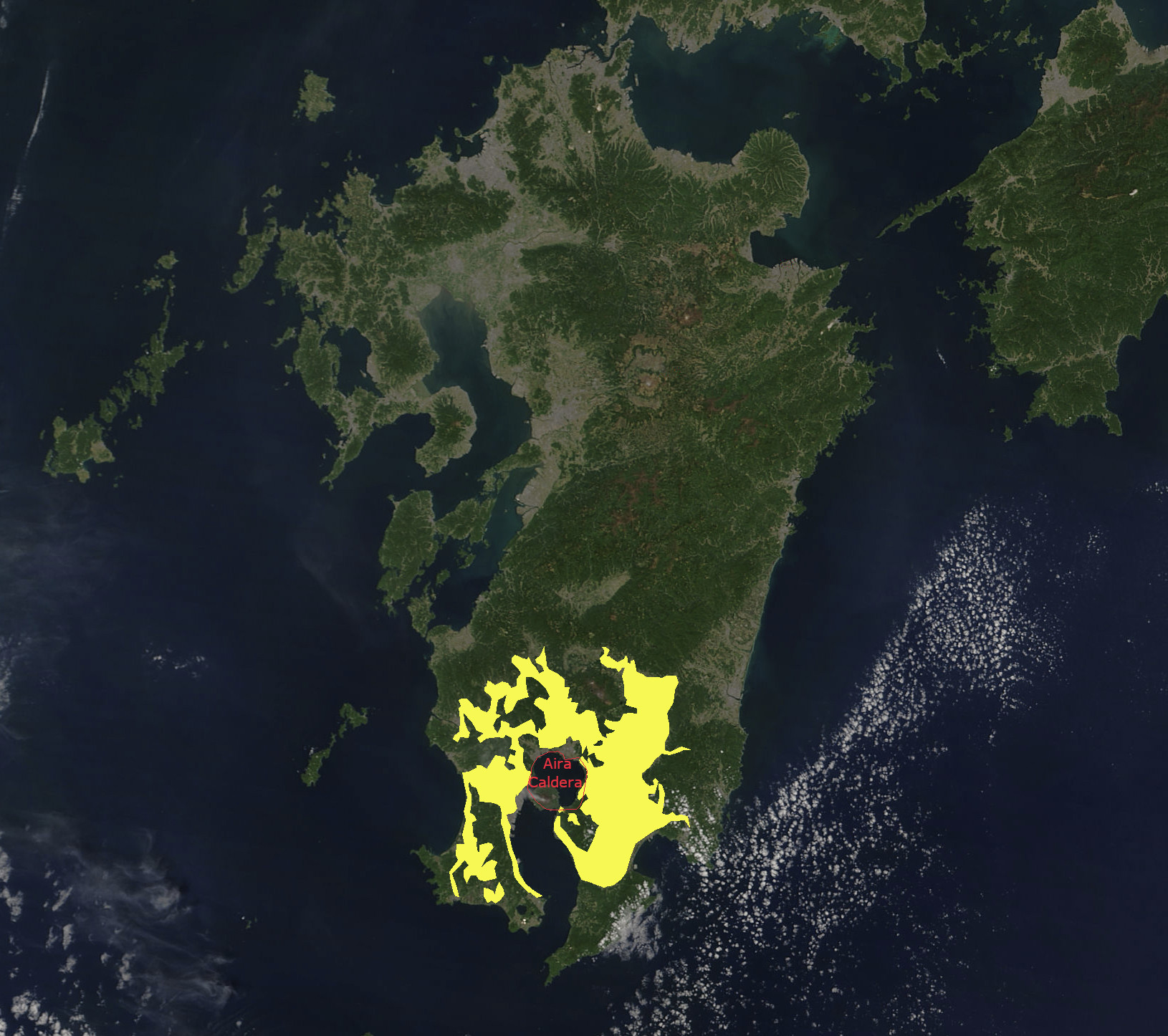
- Extent pyroclastic flow from Ito eruption, Aira Caldera (red outline), Kyushu, Japan as represented by approximate Ito Ignimbrite distribution (yellow)
- Interactive map of Shirasu-Daichi
- Coordinates: 31°41′00″N 130°52′00″E
- Location: Southern Kyūshū, Japan
- Formed by: Volcanic action

Shirasu-Daichi (シラス台地) is a broad pyroclastic plateau in southern Japan. It covers almost all of southern Kyūshū, which was formed by pyroclastic flows. It covers more than half of Kagoshima Prefecture, as well as 16% of Miyazaki Prefecture. The Japanese Shirasu (シラス) is a local name of the pumiceous sediments in Kagoshima Prefecture, Japan. The term has been recommended to be used just for the non-welded ignimbrite component in the Japanese geological literature. Daichi (台地) means plateau.

== Geology ==
A major three phase eruption of the Aira Caldera formed in the first phase the Osumi pumice fall, had a second phase Tsumaya pyroclastic flow and in the third Ito eruption phase produced the widely distributed Aira-Tn tephra that has been dated at 29,428 to 30,148 years calibrated before present. The Aira-Tn tephra falls from this eruption were up to 0.800 m (2 ft 7.5 in) thick extending to significant depth that would have affected plant life in south eastern South Korea and Honshu. This and Ito Ignimbrite up to 160 m (520 ft) thick, are the most significant pyroclastic deposits of the plateau. However an eruption about 11,000 years before present did result in the Satsuma pumice fall and there have been multiple relatively minor ash falls since from the local active volcanoes.
