= Kikai Caldera =

Mostly-submerged caldera in the Ōsumi Islands of Kagoshima Prefecture, Japan

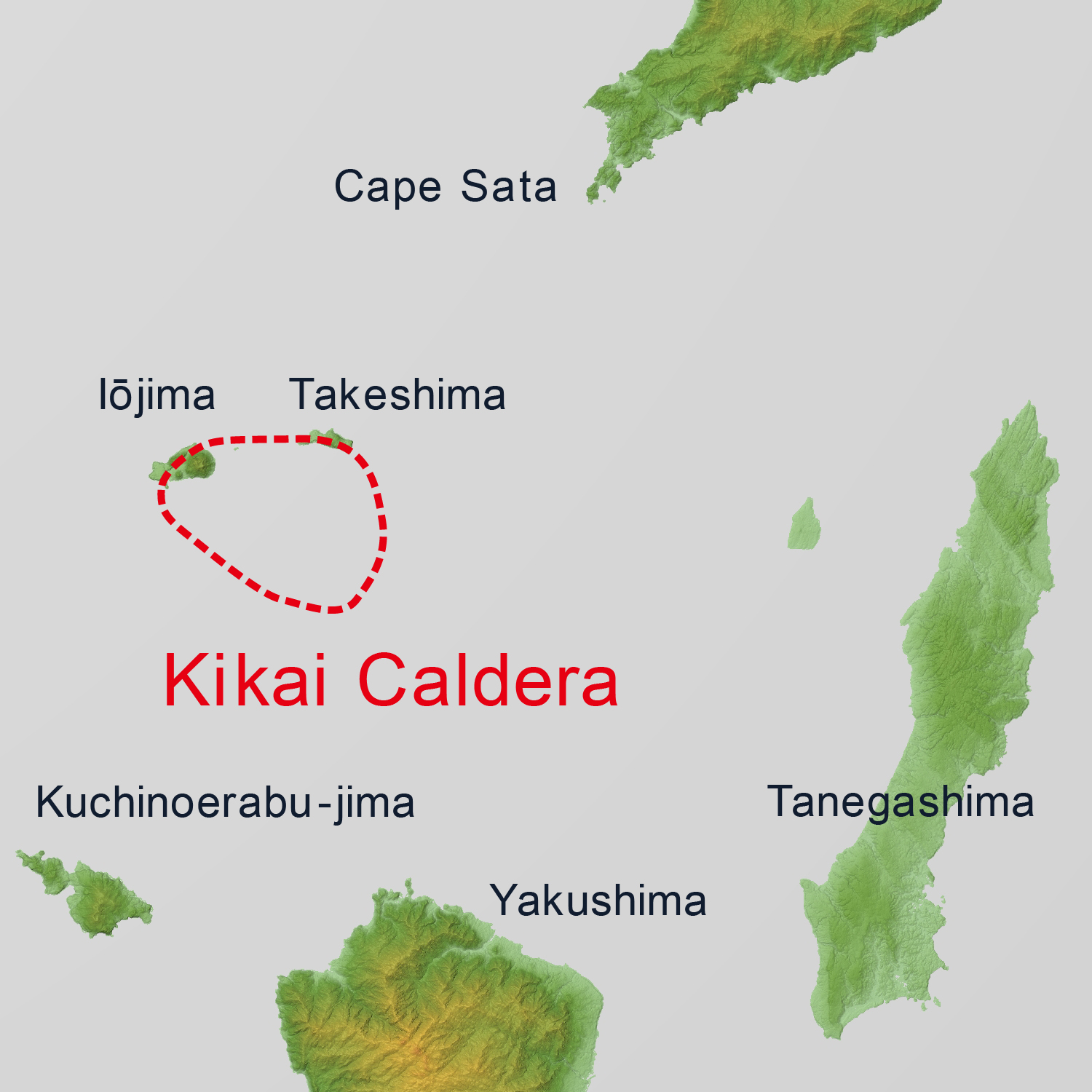

Highest point
- Peak: Mount Iō (Iōjima), Iōjima, Ōsumi Islands, Japan
- Elevation: 704 m (2,310 ft)
- Coordinates: 30°47′N 130°19′E

Dimensions
- Length: 17 km (11 mi) NS
- Width: 20 km (12 mi) EW

Naming
- Native name: 鬼界カルデラ (Japanese)

Geography
- Map showing Kikai caldera (red) in the Kagosima graben (black) and other related caldera to the north (violet) with active volcanoes within graben as symbols
- Country: Japan
- State: Kagoshima Prefecture
- Region: Ōsumi Islands
- District: Kagoshima District
- Subdivisions: Mount Yahazu; Mount Iō (Iōjima); Mount Inamura (Iōjima); Iōjima; Shin Iōjima; Takeshima; Mount Nakasone; Mount Asase; Mount Shitakisone; Iō Tai; Takeshima Tai
- Municipality: Mishima

Geology
- Rock age: 6,300 to 95,000 years ago

Kikai Caldera (鬼界カルデラ, Kikai karudera) (alternatively Kikaiga-shima, Kikai Caldera Complex) is a massive, mostly submerged caldera up to 19 kilometres (12 mi) in diameter in the Ōsumi Islands of Kagoshima Prefecture, Japan.

== Geology ==
The Kikai Caldera is the southernmost caldera in the Kagoshima graben, a volcano-tectonic graben extending under the northeast East China Sea to the island of Kyushu in southern Japan. Its volcanic activity is associated with the subduction of the Philippine Sea plate beneath the Eurasia plate.

The Kikai Caldera Complex has twin ovoid caldera 20 km (12 mi) by 17 km (11 mi) in diameter. Yahazu-dake (north west part of Satsuma Io-jima) and Takeshima, located on the caldera rim, are pre-caldera volcanoes. The pre-caldera stage of volcanic activity involved rhyolite, basalt, and andesite phases. The earliest definitive caldera formation has been dated back to at least 140,000 years ago, resulting from the eruption of Koabiyama pyroclastic flows. The formation of caldera has been associated with at least three catastrophic ignimbrite eruptions. Additionally, there are two older deposits (Koseda pyroclastic flows and Anbo tephra) of large caldera-forming eruptions in the vicinity, although their attribution to the Kikai caldera remains controversial.

=== Kikai-Koabiyama eruption ===
The Kikai-Koabiyama (K-Kob) pyroclastic flows are rhyolitic and are distributed across most of Takeshima and the plateau-like area on the northwest side of the caldera rim of Satsuma Iwo-Jima. They consist of numerous thin flow units and fill the basins in the basement, exhibiting significant variation in thickness. In Takeshima, the pyroclastic flows are thick, ranging from 20–100 m (66–328 ft), whereas in Iwo Jima, they are relatively thin, measuring a few to 30 m (98 ft).

The eruption of the K-Kob pyroclastic flows has been dated using K-Ar dating to be 140,000±20,000 years before present. While no distal tephra from this eruption has been reported, a tephra layer with potential geochemical and age correlation has been discovered in Lake Suigetsu.

=== Kikai-Tozurahara eruption ===
Kikai-Tozurahara (K-Tz) tephra is a widespread rhyolitic tephra layer of Late Pleistocene age, attributed to a large VEI-7 eruption from the Kikai caldera. This layer is confirmed to have a wide distribution, extending from south Kyushu to eastern Honshu and reaching the Pacific Ocean, and possibly including the Shandong Peninsula. The proximal equivalents of K-Tz are the Nagase pyroclastic flow and the Nishinoomote pyroclastic surges. The combined bulk volume of both distal and proximal deposits is estimated to exceed 150 km^{3} (36 mi^{3}).

In marine isotope stratigraphy (MIS), K-Tz is located between MIS 5.2 and 5.3, providing a loosely constrained preliminary eruption age of approximately 95,000 years before present. More reliable age constraints were imposed by the high-resolution chronology derived from the Lake Suigetsu sediment sequence, which yielded an age of 94,500±4,800 years before present for this eruption.

=== Kikai-Akahoya eruption ===
Kikai-Kikai-Akahoya (K-Ah) tephra and pyroclastic flow impact from Kikai-Akahoya eruption

The caldera was the source of the Kikai-Akahoya eruption, one of the largest eruptions during the Holocene (10,000 years ago to present) that produced the Kikai-Akahoya (K-Ah) tephra. Between 7,200 and 7,300 years ago, pyroclastic flows producing Koya ignimbrite from that eruption reached the coast of southern Kyūshū up to 100 km (62 mi) away, and ash fell as far as Hokkaido. The eruption produced about 133–183 km^{3} (32–44 cu mi) DRE, most of it tephra. giving it a Volcanic Explosivity Index of 7, so making it one of the most explosive in the last 10,000 years, ranking alongside the eruptions of Santorini, Paektu, Crater Lake, Kurile Lake, Samalas and Tambora.

The eruption had a major impact on the Jōmon culture in southern Kyūshū although the impact was not as great as some commentary had suggested with Nishinozono sub-type pottery tradition, that had started prior to the eruption, maintained in Kyūshū.

== 2024 studies ==
Japanese scientists conducted an extensive study of the volcanic activity of the Kikai underwater caldera. They had estimated the volumes of ejected volcanic material, which range from 332 to 457 cubic kilometers, and proved that it was the largest eruption in the last 11,700 years that occurred here 7,300 years ago. They were able to recreate the sequence of a large-scale volcanic event and identified three directions of flow of eruption products: in the atmosphere, along the seabed and along the water's edge.

Details of the marine expedition include conducting seismological studies and collecting sediment samples around the Kikai caldera. Scientists have confirmed that volcanic formations on the ocean floor and nearby islands have a common position. Analysis of the distribution of these deposits around the eruption site helps to understand how the pyroclastic flow and water interacted. The eruption occurred with a strong ejection of debris and ash, which corresponds to the usual phase of the Plinian type, during which there was a series of prolonged emissions under high pressure of fragmented lava and pumice in the form of a gas-ash mixture. It was a volumetric pyroclastic flow as a final stage, which partially spread along the seabed and released into the atmosphere in the form of an eruptive column (ash, fragments of pumice, small crystals and tephra). The tephra cloud covered an area of more than 2.8×10^{6} km^{2}. The volume of ash material amounted to more than 370 km^{3} in terms of hard rock. The Plinian phase ended with the destruction of the eruptive column. A huge column of hot tephra fell a few hundred meters from the eruption's center, causing the formation of a pyroclastic flow.

Since the center of the volcano was under water, the Akahoya eruption had the character of a steam explosion (or a series of explosions) due to the instantaneous release of steam upon contact of hot magma with water. As a result, a double caldera was formed.

Scientists had conducted a detailed study of the spread of volcanic material over an area of about 4500 km^{2} around the center of the eruption and mapped the thickness of the underwater pyroclastic sediment. In their opinion, 133 to 183 km^{3} of pumice and ash settled on the studied area.

After analyzing the textures and nature of the fragments of the underwater volcanic strata, the authors concluded that it was formed from a suspended stream, which can cover long distances even upslope, as it turned out. Having built a model of the Kikai-Akahoya eruption, researchers have found that in addition to the underwater pyroclastic flow and the powerful release of the tephra cloud into the atmosphere, there was also a third stream of thin volcanic material that spread along the surface of the water to the nearest islands.

=== Eruptive history since Kikai-Akahoya eruption ===
Kikai is still an active volcano. Io-dake (Mount Iō), Inamura-dake (south coast of Satsuma-Io-jima), Tokara-Iwo-Jima (north east coast of Satsuma-Io-jima), and Shōwa Iōjima (Shin-Io-jima) are post-caldera volcanoes within it. Minor eruptions occur frequently on Mount Iō, one of the post-caldera subaerial volcanic peaks on Iōjima. Iōjima is one of three volcanic islands, two of which lie on the caldera rim. On 4 June 2013, weak tremors were recorded. Shortly after, eruptions began and continued off-and-on for several hours. Io-dake is monitored for earthquake, gas, and steam-plume activity so that between the 2020 and 2023 eruptions it is known to have had continuous, low-grade activity.

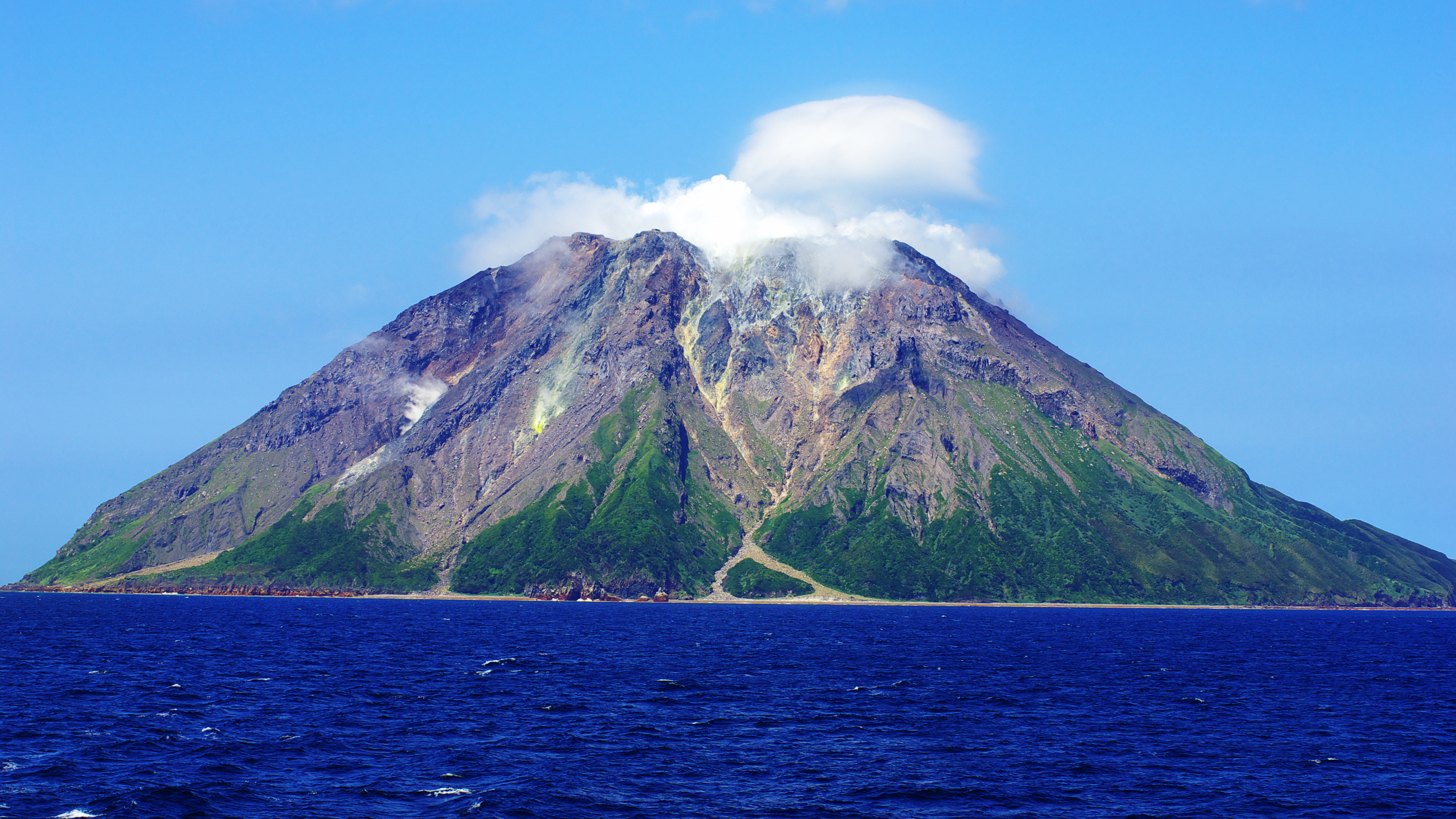
Mount Iō, a rhyolite lava dome, May 2015, viewed from the east

Eruptions occurred:

- Old Iwo-dake stage (stage OIo-I-II)
  - Phreatomagmatic eruptions and pumice fallout (stage OIo-I), followed by rhyolitic lava with continuous tephra, resulting in a volcanic edifice (stage OIo-II)
  - 3250 BCE ± 75 years (uncalibrated) Old Iwo-dake
    - OIo1a,b tephras
  - 2450 BCE ± 840 years (tephrochronology) Old Iwo-dake
    - OIo2a,b tephras
- Inamura-dake stage (stage In-I-IV)
  - Basaltic lava flows and scoria-cone building (stage In-I-II), then phreatomagmatic eruptions (stage In-III), and then andesitic lava (stage In-IV)
  - 1830 BCE ± 75 years (uncalibrated) Inamura-dake
    - In-I tephra
  - 1090 BCE ± 100 years (uncalibrated) Inamura-dake
- young Iwo-dake stage (stage YIo-I-IV)
  - Continuing with a different magma source including rhyolitic lava and intermittent pumice
  - 280 BCE ± 75 years (uncalibrated) Iwo-dake
  - 390 ± 100 years (uncalibrated) Iwo-dake
  - 750 (tephrochronology) Iwo-dake
  - 830 ± 40 years (uncalibrated) Iwo-dake
    - K-Iw-P1 tephra
  - 1010 ± 40 years (uncalibrated) Iwo-dake
    - K-Sk-u-3 tephra
  - 1030 ± 40 years (uncalibrated) Iwo-dake
    - K-Sk-u-4 tephra
  - 1340 ± 30 years (uncalibrated) Iwo-dake
    - K-Iw-P2 tephra
  - 1430 ± 75 years (uncalibrated) Iwo-dake
  - 13 Feb 1914 Tokara-Iwo-Jima
  - Sep–Nov 1934
    - Submarine eruption with pumice
  - 7 Dec 1934 – Mar 1935 2 km east of Tokara-Iwo-Jima
    - New island Shōwa Iōjima (Shin-Io-jima) with lava finally stabilised 19 January 1935
  - 199–-2003 Iwo-dake
    - Formation and enlargement of new pit crater inside the summit crater
  - Apr–Nov 1998 Iwo-dake
    - Ash
  - May–Aug 1999 Iwo-dake
    - Ash
  - Jan, Mar, Oct–Dec 2000 Iwo-dake
    - Ash
  - Feb, Apr–Dec 2001 Iwo-dake
    - Ash
  - May–Jul 2002 Iwo-dake
    - Ash
  - Feb, Apr–Oct 2003 Iwo-dake
    - Ash
  - May–Apr, Jun, Aug–Oct 2004 Iwo-dake
    - Ash
  - 3–5 May, 3–5 Jun 2013 Iwo-dake
    - Minor eruptions
  - 2 Nov 2019 Iwo-dake
    - Minor eruption
  - 29 Apr 2020 Iwo-dake
    - Minor eruption
  - 6 Oct 2020 Iwo-dake
    - Minor eruption
- 27 Mar 2023 – 22 Nov 2023
    - Minor eruptions

== See also ==
- List of volcanoes in Japan
