= Mount Kirishima =

Volcanic group on the island of Kyushu

Kirishima Mountains
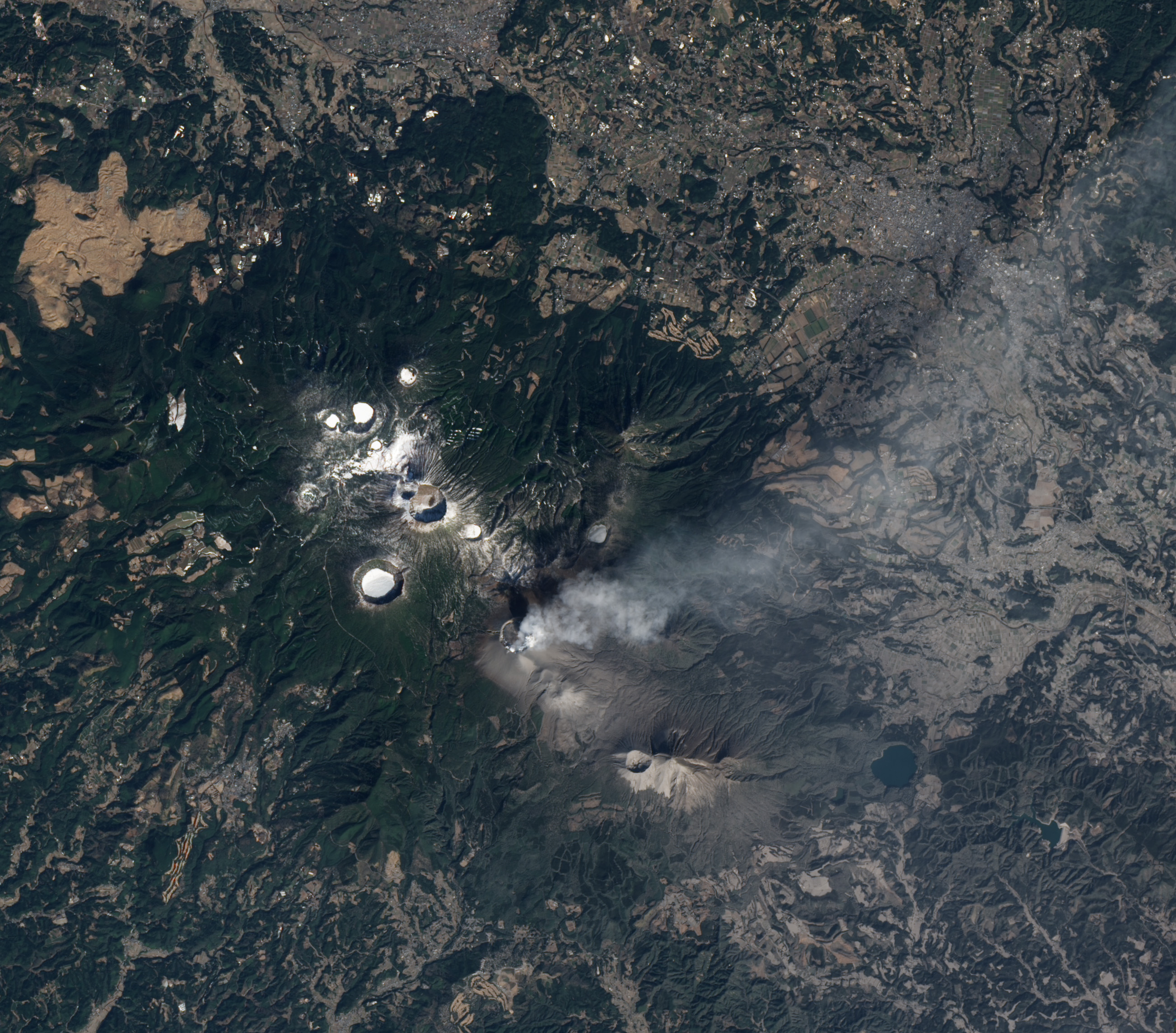
- Kirishima volcano group

Highest point
- Peak: Karakuni-dake
- Elevation: 1,700 m (5,600 ft)
- Coordinates: 31°56′17″N 130°51′41″E

Geography
- Country: Japan
- Prefectures: Kagoshima Prefecture and Miyazaki Prefecture

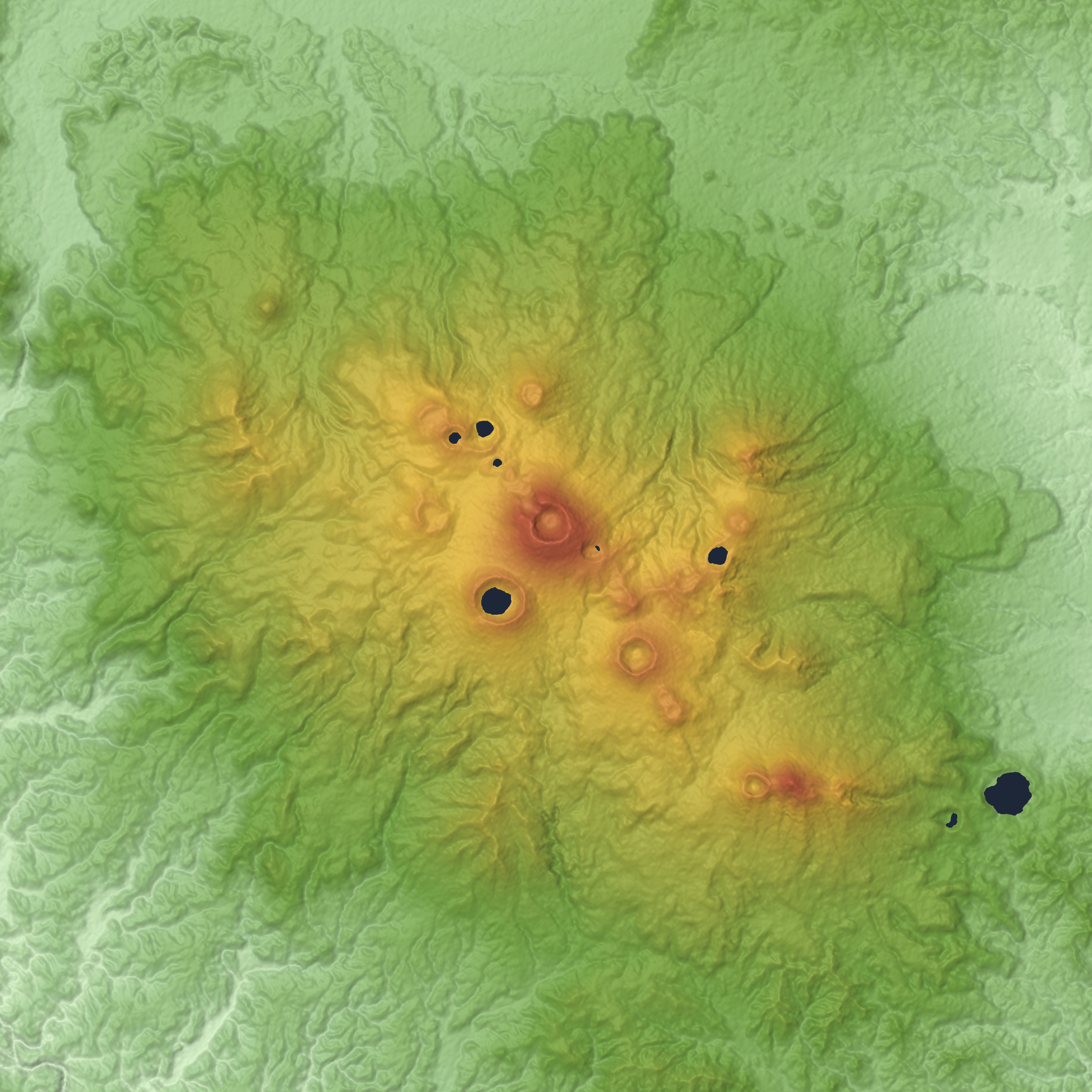
Relief map of Kirishima Volcano

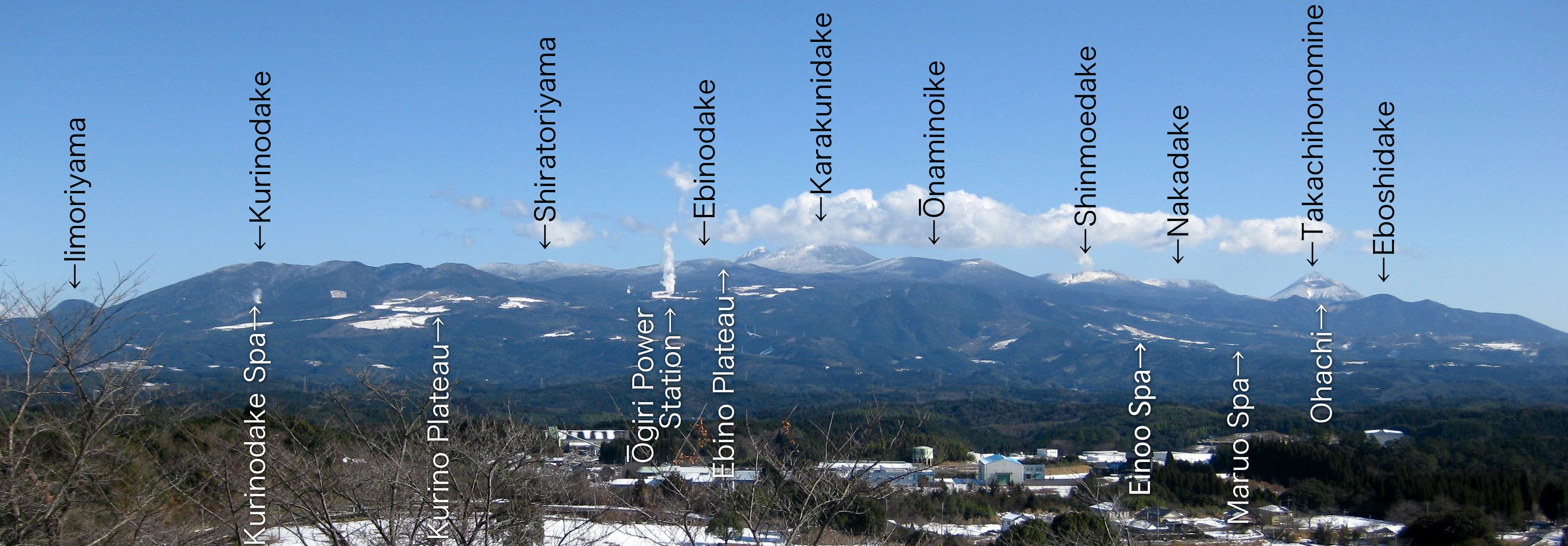
View on the southern side of the volcano group

The Kirishima Mountains (霧島山, Kirishima-yama) are a 1,700-meter-high active volcano group in Kagoshima Prefecture and Miyazaki Prefecture, Kyushu, Japan. Numerous eruptions have been recorded since 742. Very strong eruptions happened in 788, 1716, and 1717. Augite-hypersthene andesite is the dominant rock type.

The highest peak is Karakuni-dake (韓国岳, Karakunidake) (1,700 m). Its name literally means "Korea Peak"; it was once believed to be so high that the Korean Peninsula could be seen from its summit. Other peaks include the sacred and often fabled in national foundation mythology, Takachiho-no-mine (高千穂峰) (1,573 m) as well as Shinmoedake (新燃岳), both active volcanoes. They are part of Kirishima-Yaku National Park near Kirishima City. Legend via oldest extant texts state the summit of Takachiho was stuck the mysterious spear Ama-no-Sakahoko, by the legendary Ninigi-no-Mikoto. Mount Kirishima is considered one of the 100 Famous Japanese Mountains. The area is often foggy, and it is believed that the name Kirishima comes from the mountain looking like an island in the fog.

The Kongō-class battlecruiser Kirishima of the Imperial Japanese Navy, and the Kongō-class guided missile destroyer Kirishima of the Japan Maritime Self-Defense Force were both named after this mountain.

Shinmoedake is the most active of the Mount Kirishima volcanoes, having erupted in January 2011, March 2011, October 2017, April 2018, June 2025, and August 2025.

The region as well as areas downstream is in the path of expanding Meiyu front from the continent, during the East Asian rainy season, potentially unleashing flash flooding and landslides during this time.

Kirishima volcano group

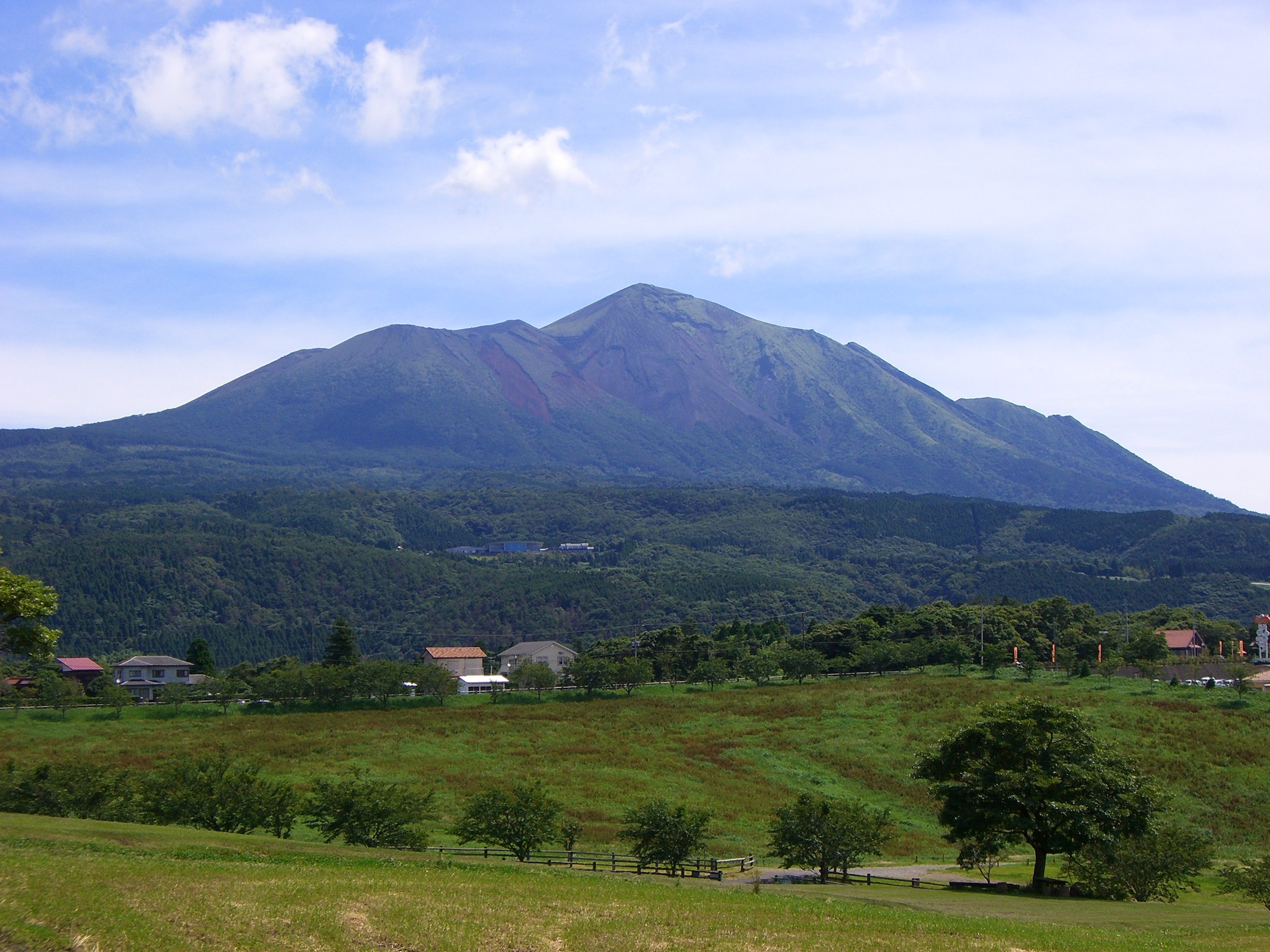
Takachihonomine Volcano

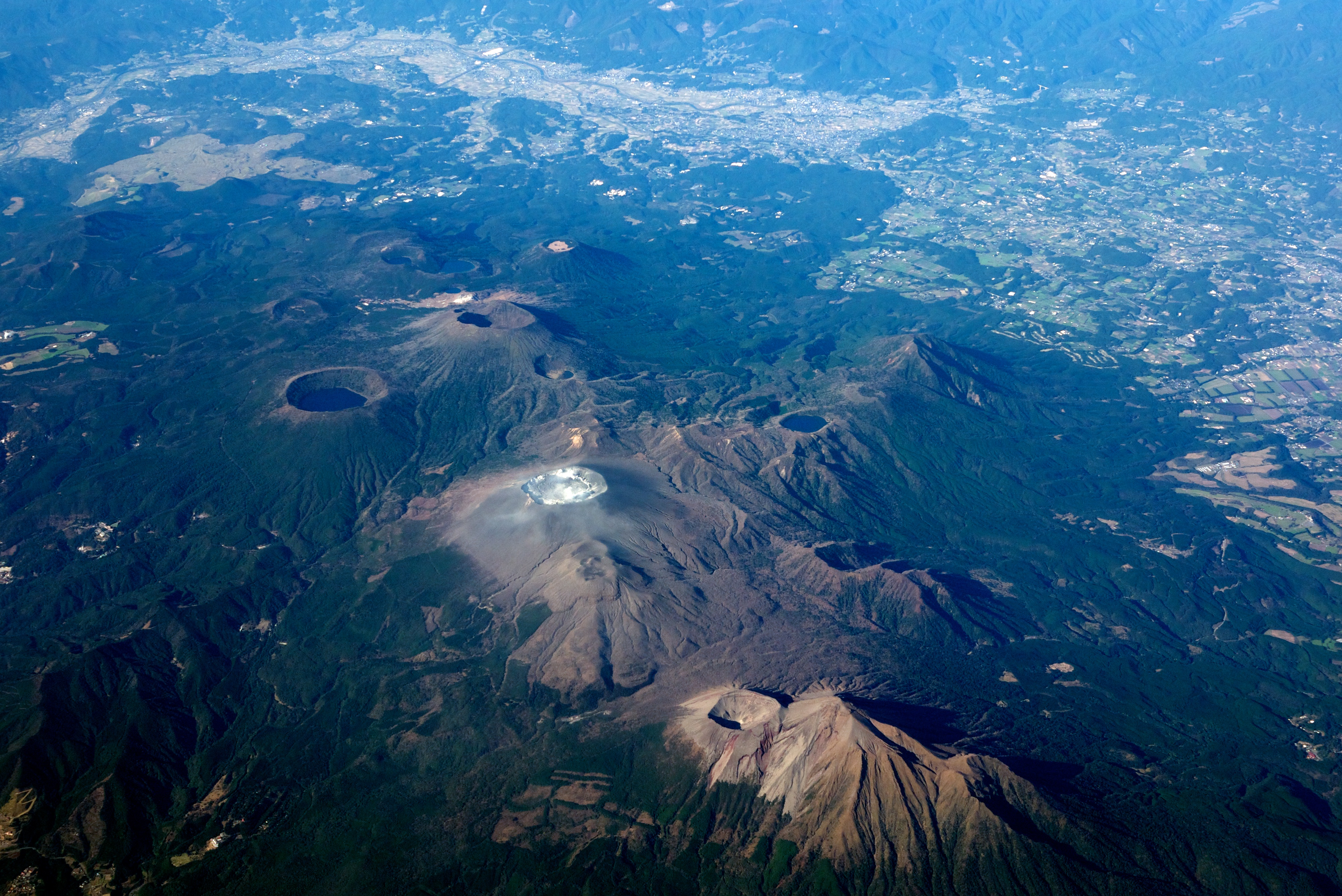
Kirishima Volcano Group

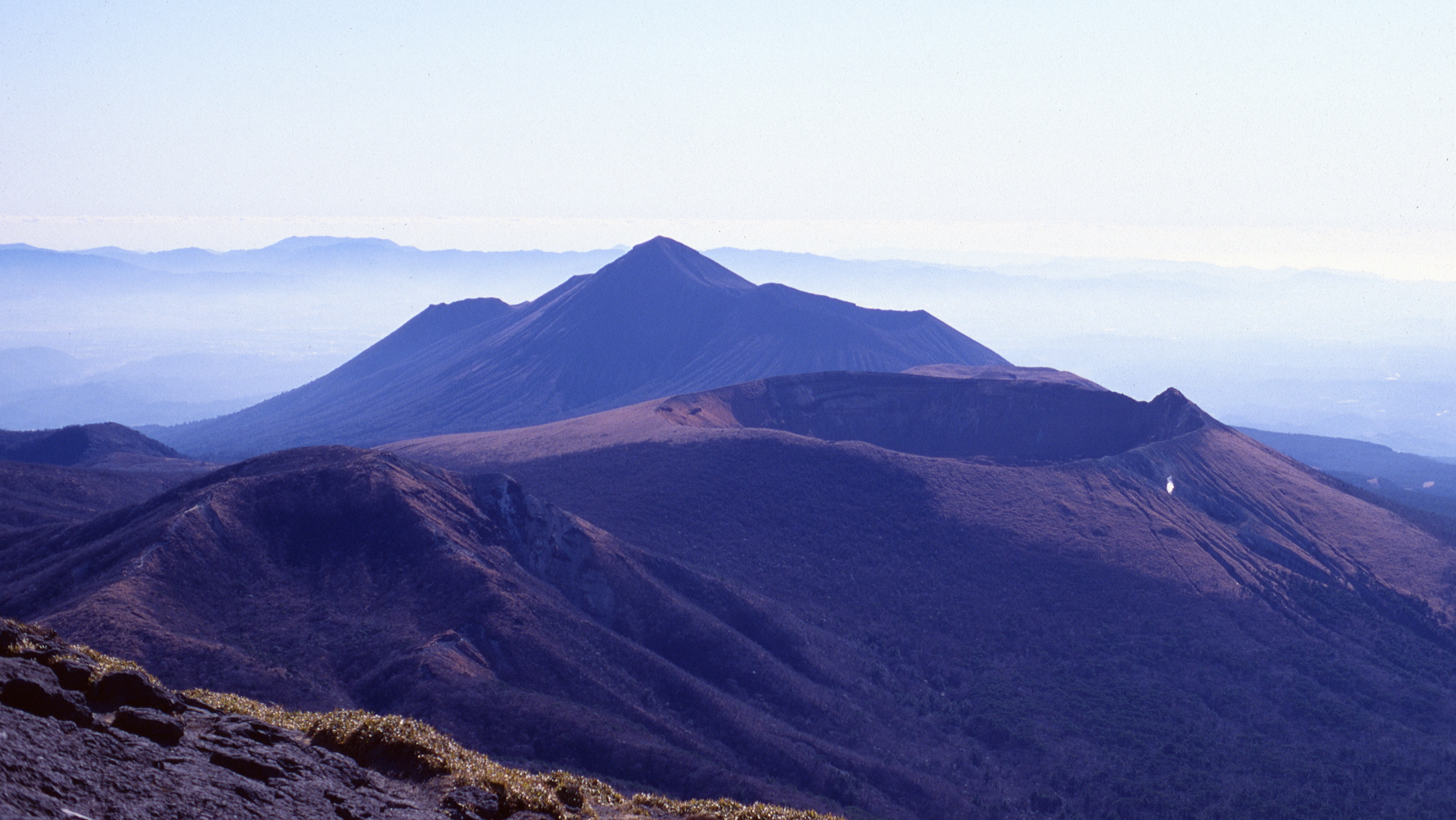
Shinmoedake Volcano (front) and Takachihonomine Volcano

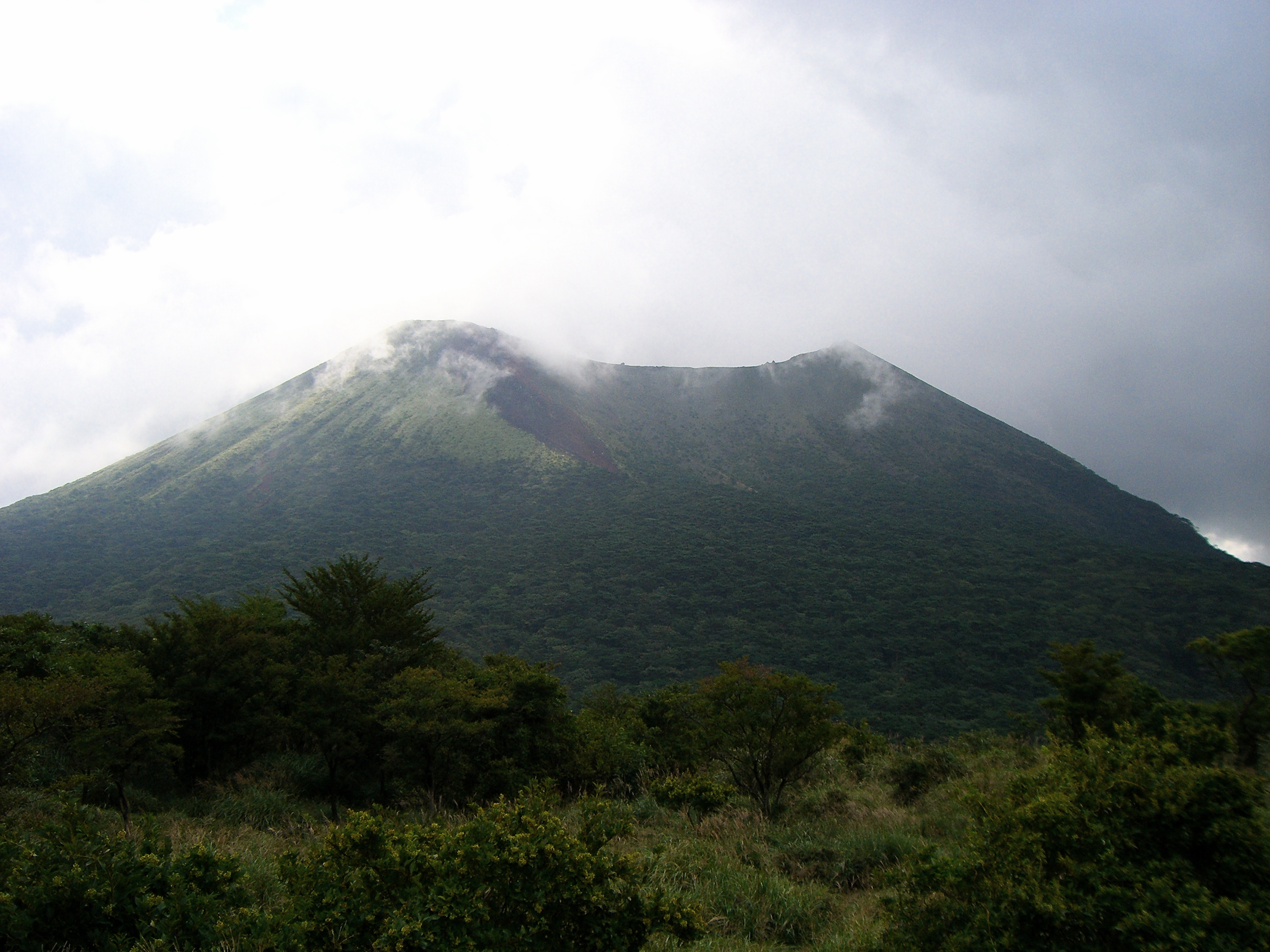
Ohachi Volcano

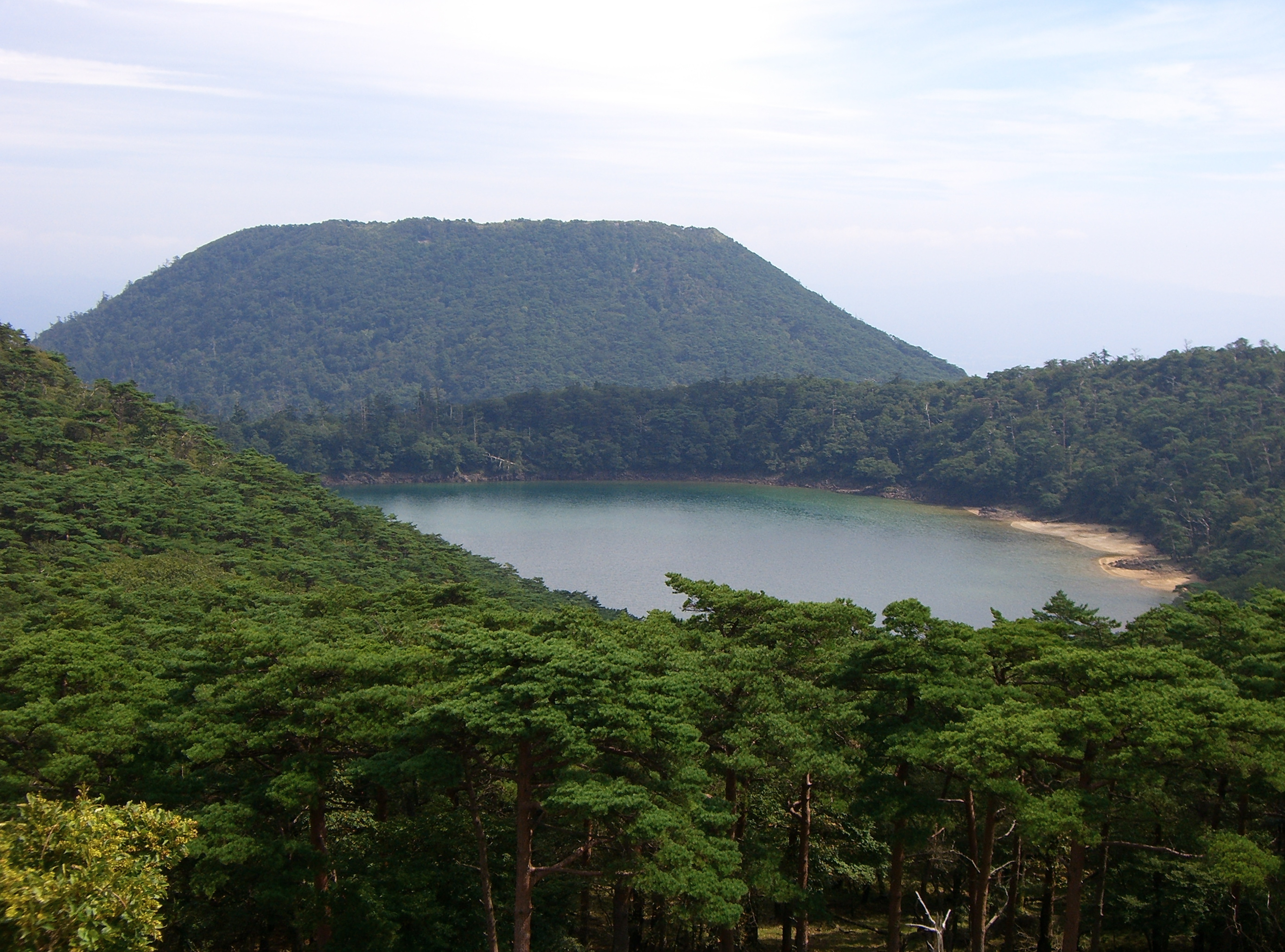
Rokkan'nonmiike Volcano (front) and Koshikidake Volcano (background)

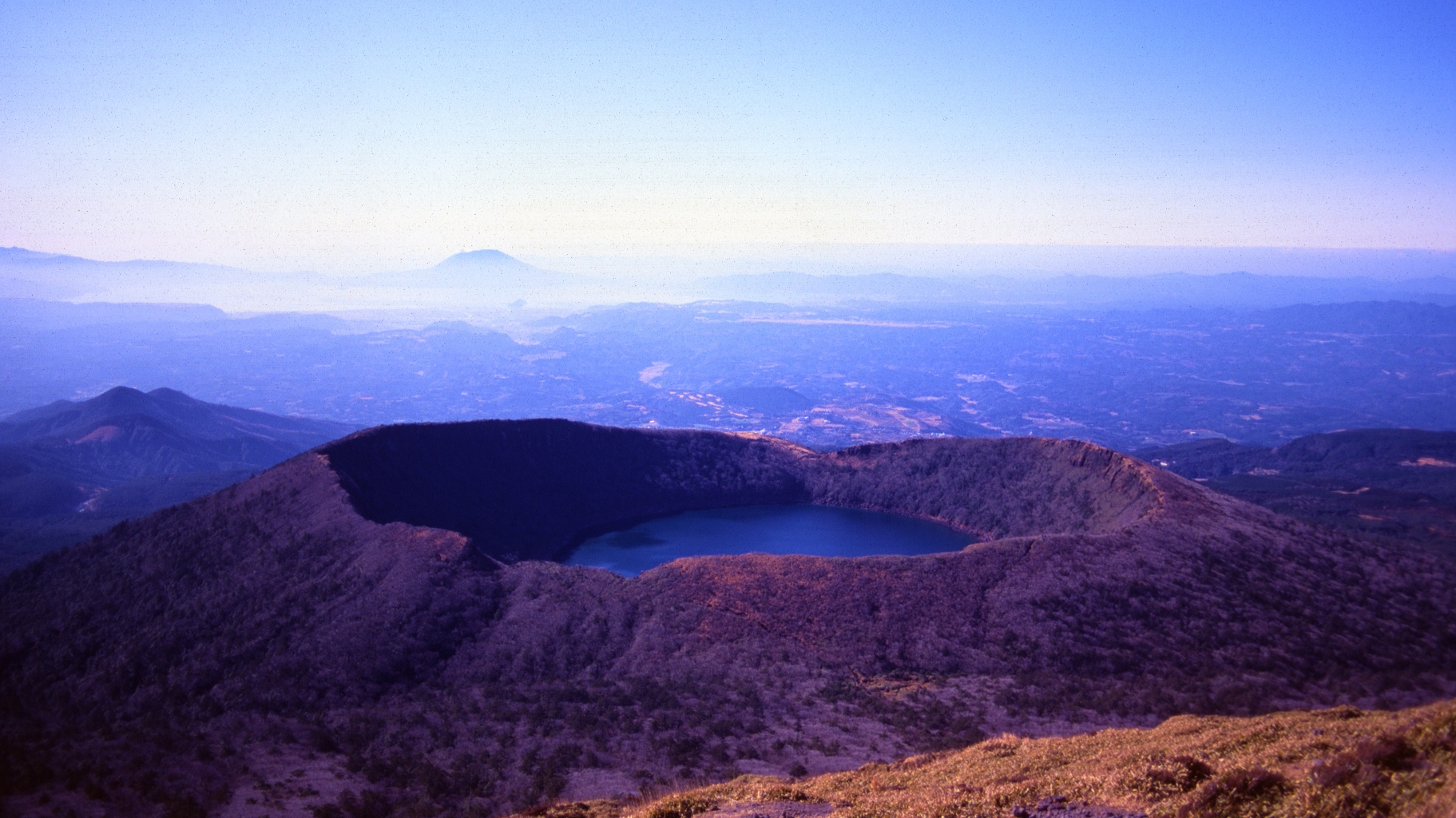
Onamiike Volcano

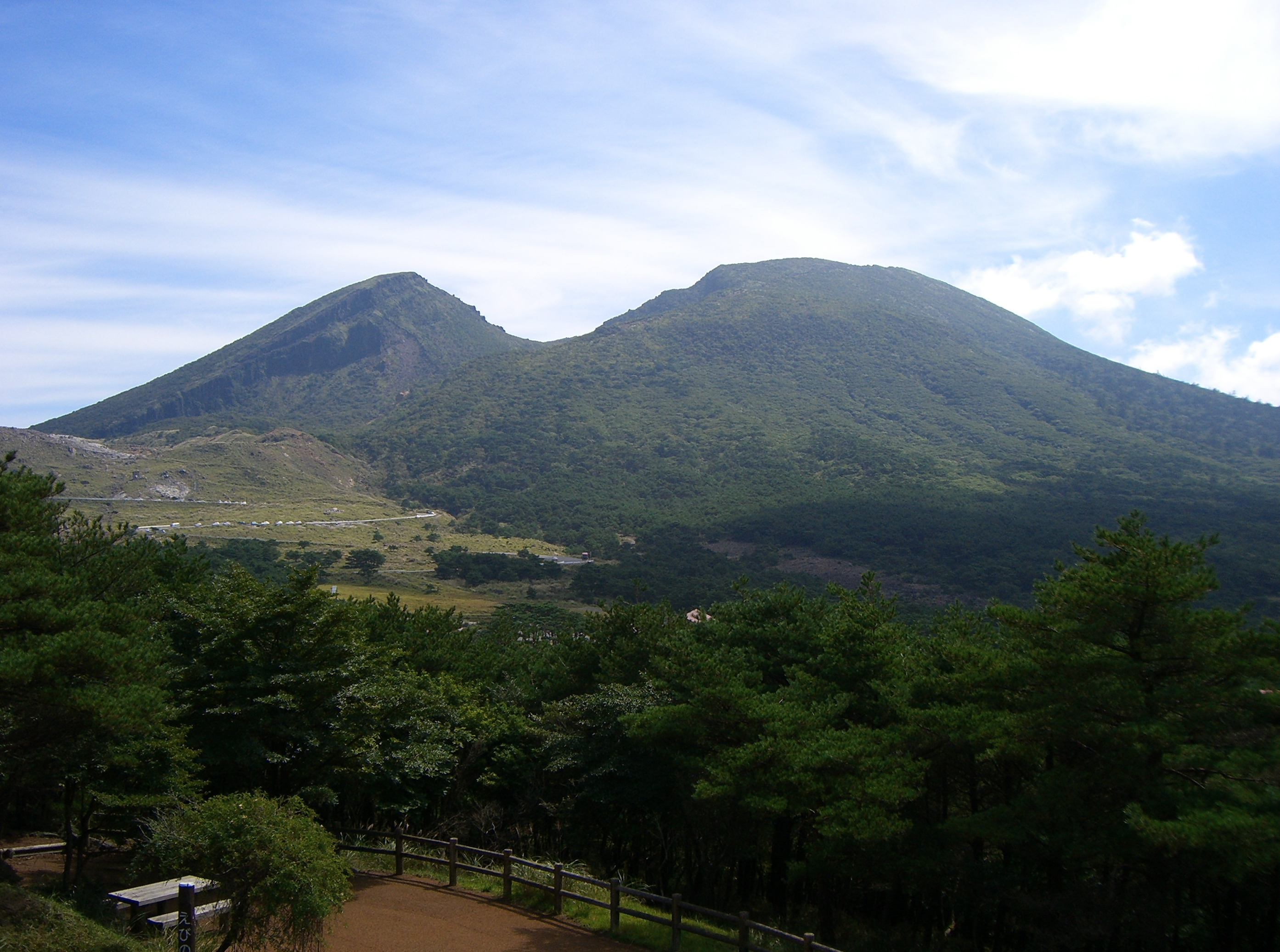
Karakunidake Volcano

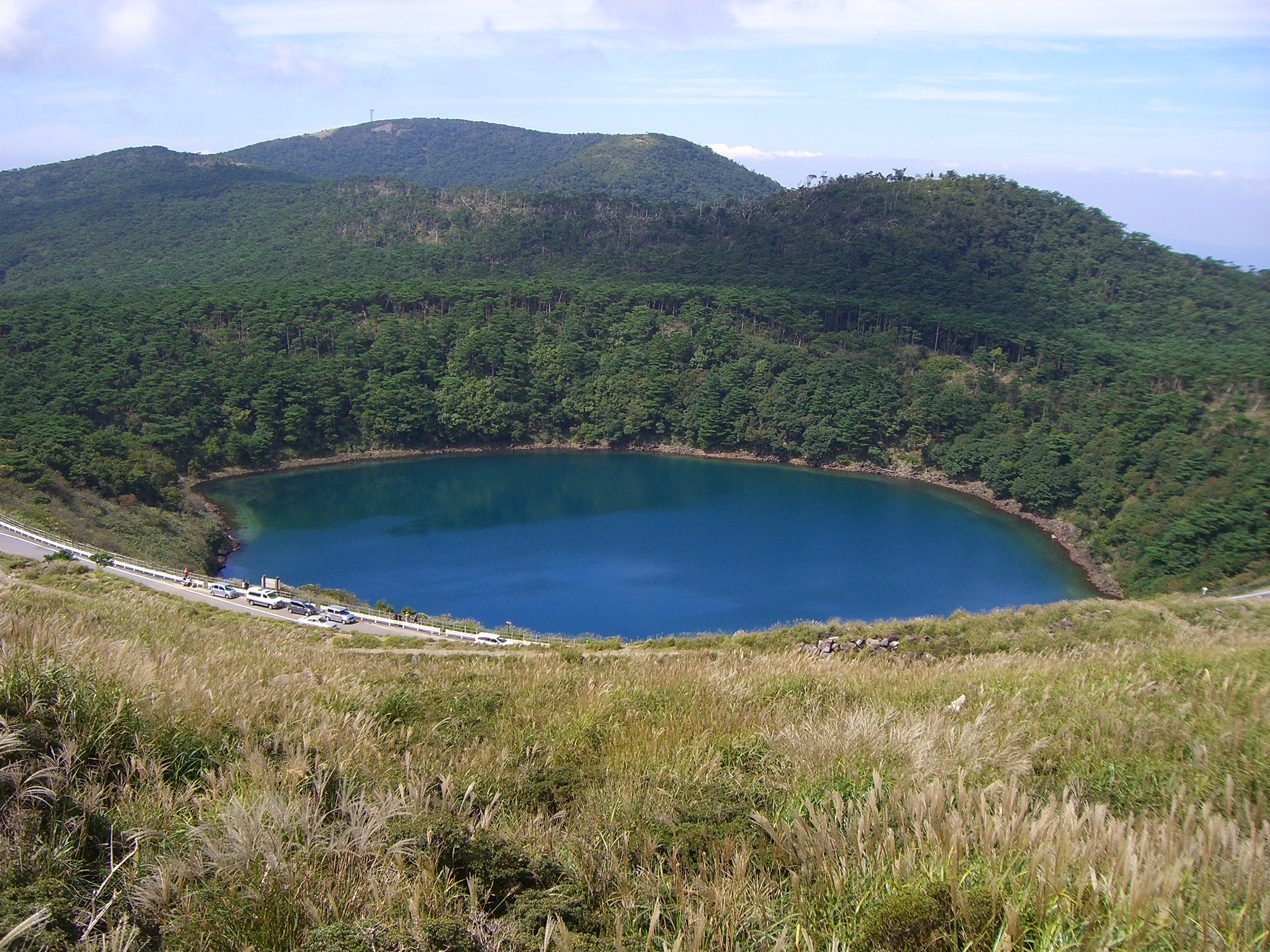
Hudouike Volcano

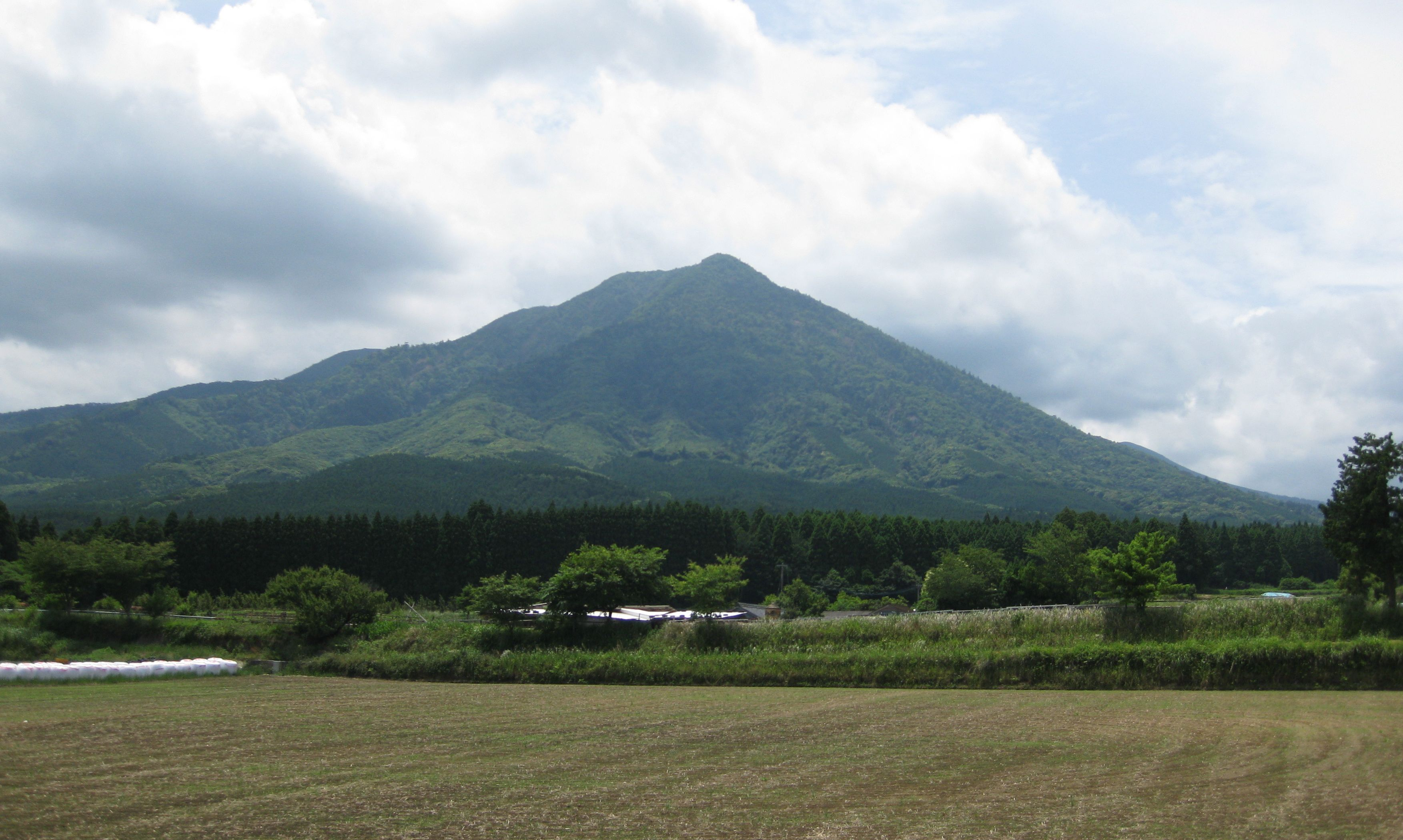
Hinamoridake Volcano

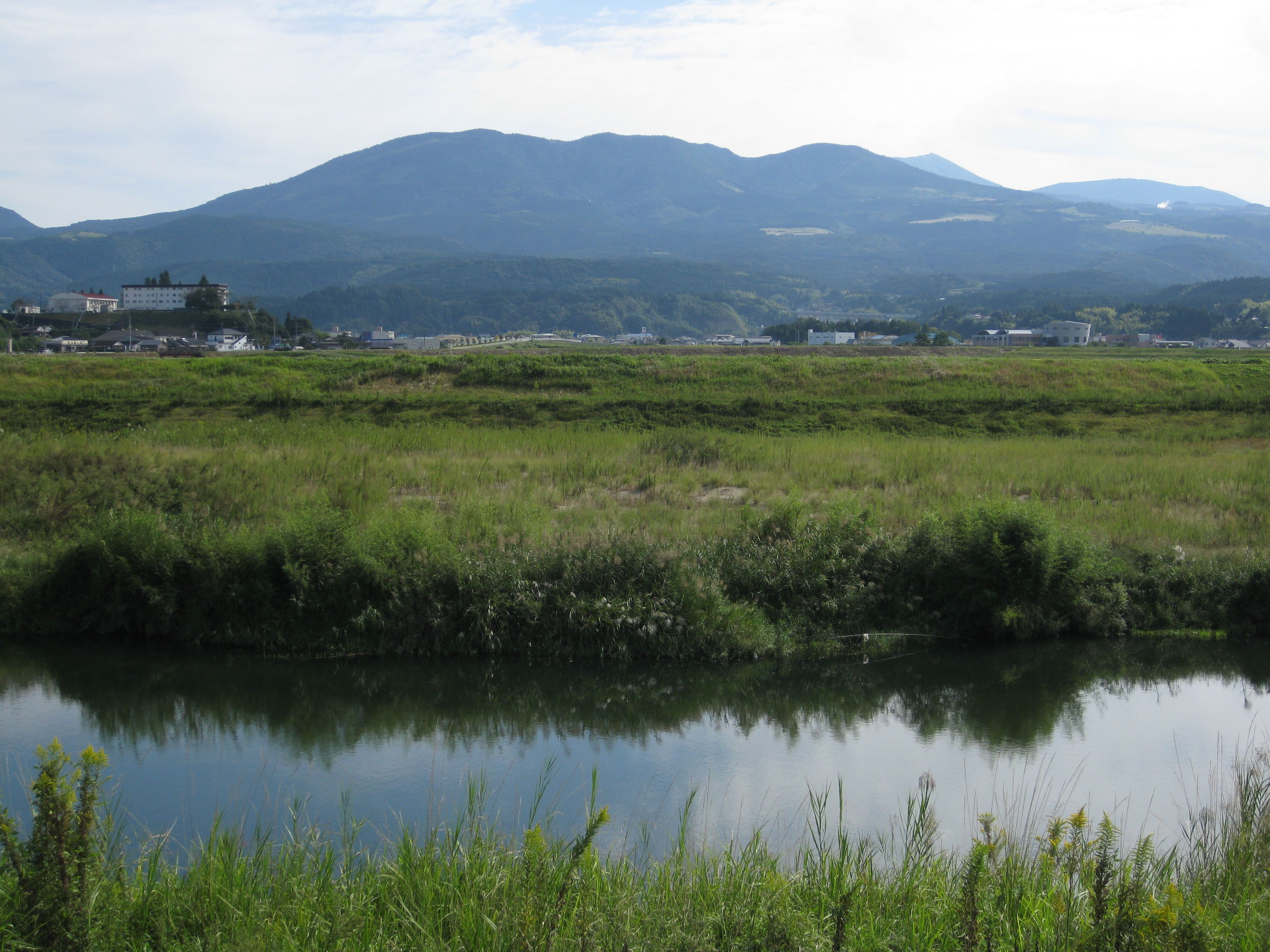
Kurinodake Volcano

== See also ==
- List of volcanoes in Japan
