= Tephra =

Fragmental material produced by a volcanic eruption

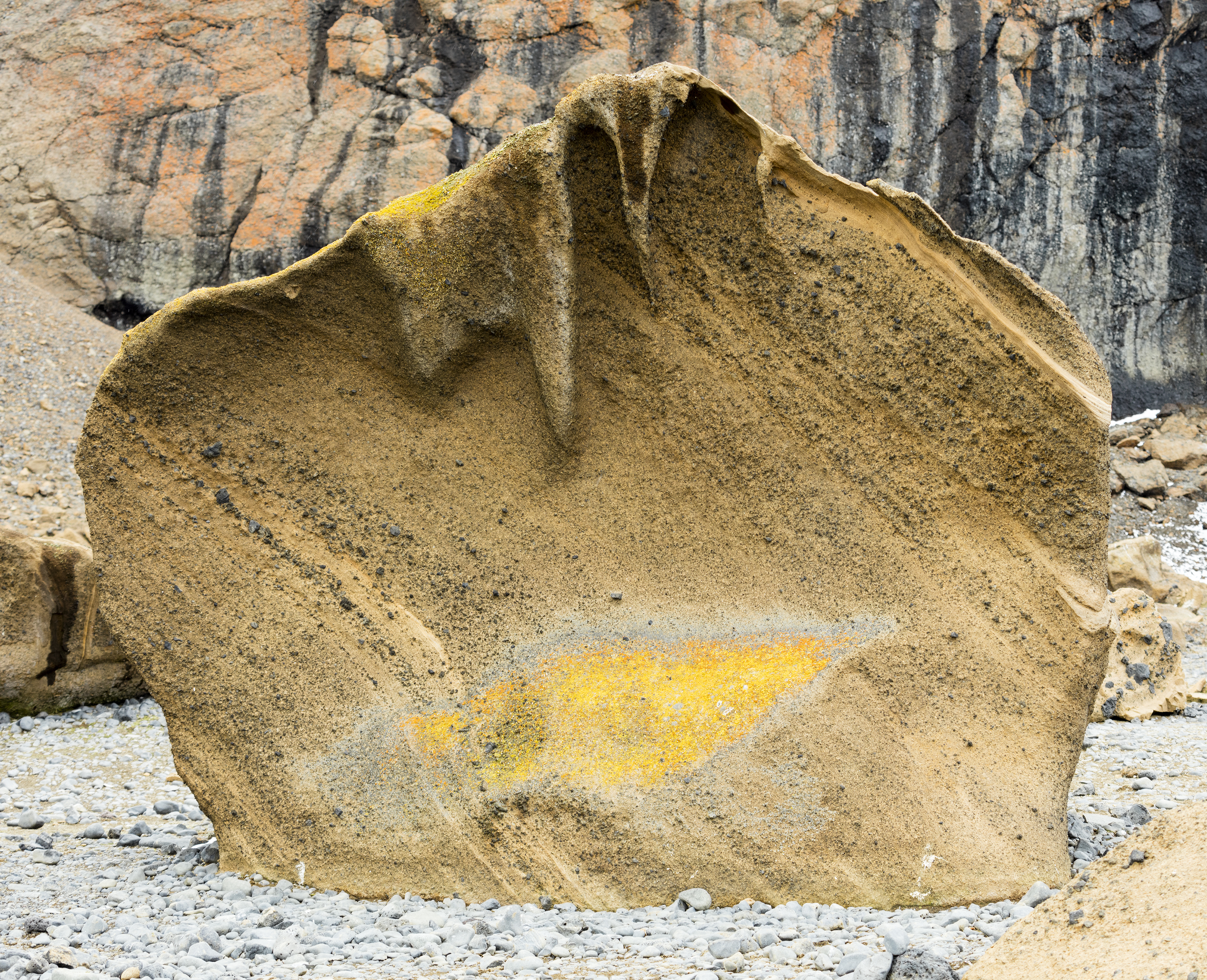
Volcanic tephra at Brown Bluff, Antarctica (2016)

Tephra is fragmental material produced by a volcanic eruption regardless of composition, fragment size, or emplacement mechanism.

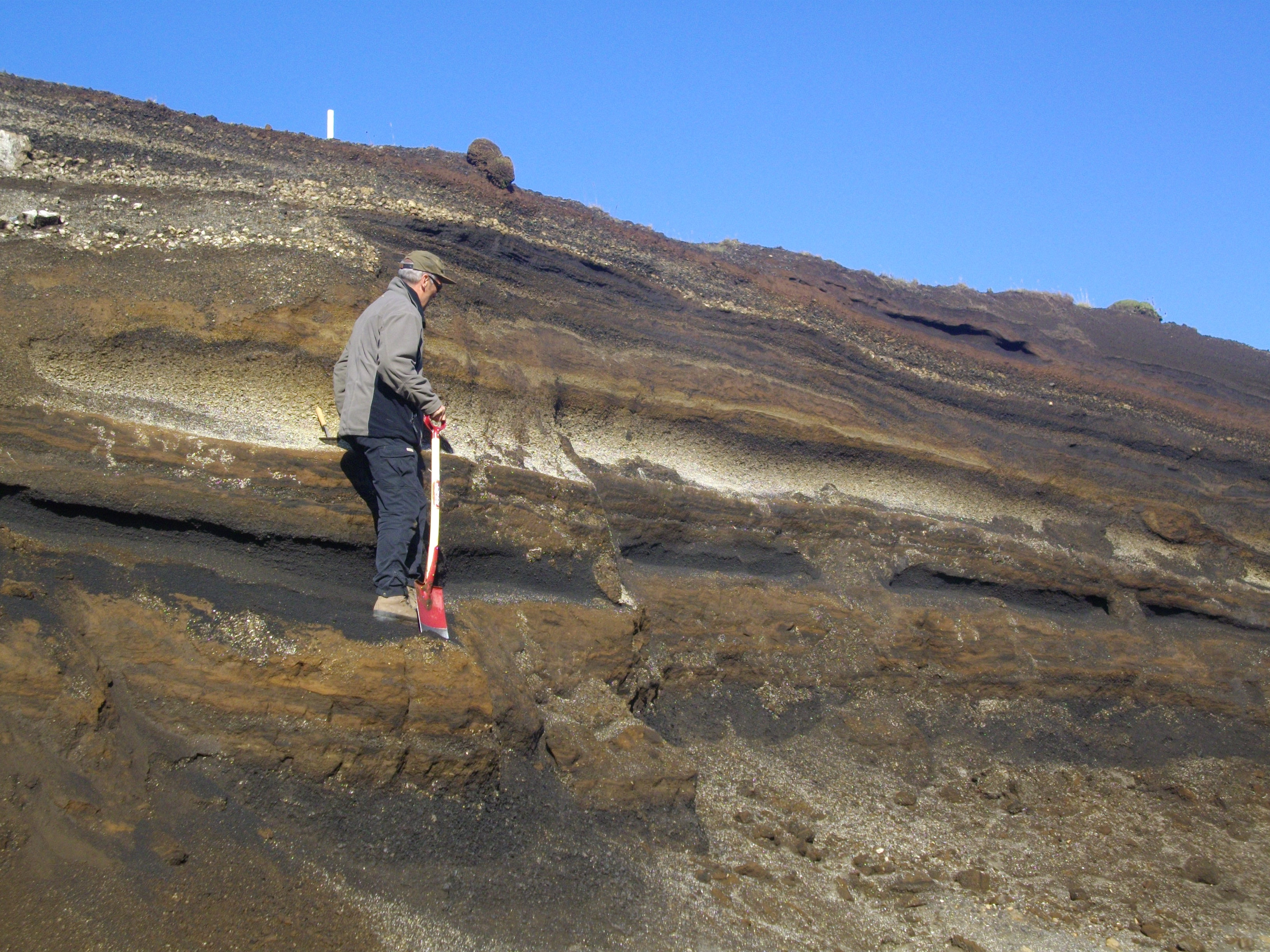
Tephra horizons in south-central Iceland: The thick and light-coloured layer at the centre of the photo is rhyolitic tephra from Hekla.

Volcanologists also refer to airborne fragments as pyroclasts. Once clasts have fallen to the ground, they remain as tephra unless hot enough to fuse into pyroclastic rock or tuff. When a volcano explodes, it releases a variety of tephra including ash, cinders, and blocks. These layers settle on the land and, over time, sedimentation occurs incorporating these tephra layers into the geologic record.

Tephrochronology is a geochronological technique that uses discrete layers of tephra—volcanic ash from a single eruption—to create a chronological framework in which paleoenvironmental or archaeological records can be placed. Often, when a volcano explodes, biological organisms are killed and their remains are buried within the tephra layer. These fossils are later dated by scientists to determine the age of the fossil and its place within the geologic record.

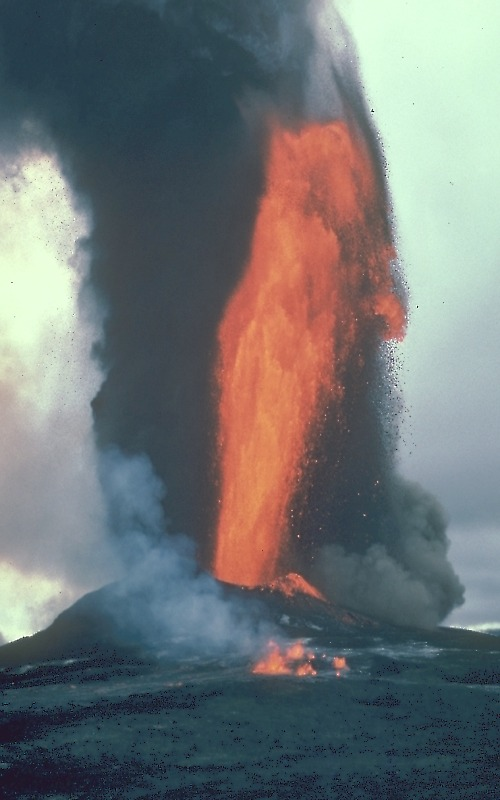
Molten lava fountain at Kilauea volcano on Hawaii, with black cloud of associated tephra

== Etymology ==
The words "tephra" and "pyroclast" both derive from Greek: The word τέφρα (téphra) means "ash", while pyroclast is derived from the Greek πῦρ (pyr), meaning "fire", and κλαστός (klastós), meaning "broken in pieces". The word τέφραv (meaning "ashes") is used in broad context within an account by Aristotle of an eruption on Vulcano (Hiera) in Meteorologica.

== Overview ==
Andesitic tephra (ash and lapilli) erupted by Soufriere Hills Volcano, Montserrat in 1997

Tephra is any sized or composition pyroclastic material produced by an explosive volcanic eruption and precise geological definitions exist. It consists of a variety of materials, typically glassy particles formed by the cooling of droplets of magma, which may be vesicular, solid or flake-like, and varying proportions of crystalline and mineral components originating from the mountain and the walls of the vent. As the particles fall to the ground, they are sorted to a certain extent by the wind and gravitational forces and form layers of unconsolidated material. The particles are further moved by ground surface or submarine water flow.

The distribution of tephra following an eruption usually involves the largest boulders falling to the ground quickest, therefore closest to the vent, while smaller fragments travel further – ash can often travel for thousands of miles, even circumglobal, as it can stay in the stratosphere for days to weeks following an eruption. When large amounts of tephra accumulate in the atmosphere from massive volcanic eruptions (or from a multitude of smaller eruptions occurring simultaneously), they can reflect light and heat from the sun back through the atmosphere, in some cases causing the temperature to drop, resulting in a temporary "volcanic winter". The effects of acidic rain and snow, the precipitation caused by tephra discharges into the atmosphere, can be seen for years after the eruptions have stopped. Tephra eruptions can affect ecosystems across millions of square kilometres or even entire continents depending on the size of the eruption.

Tephra is an important contributor to younger sedimentary rock formation. It has been estimated that about 23% of the Pacific ocean's recent sediments is tephra. Its contribution to total historical volcanic magma output is hard to estimate as many of the large igneous provinces that contribute disproportionately to the Earth's igneous rocks are predominantly flood basalts from non-explosive effusive eruptions. The more likely to be explosive silicic eruptions that form some large igneous provinces have a very wide modelling range of total eruptive product being distal tephra of between 30% to 80%.

== Classification ==
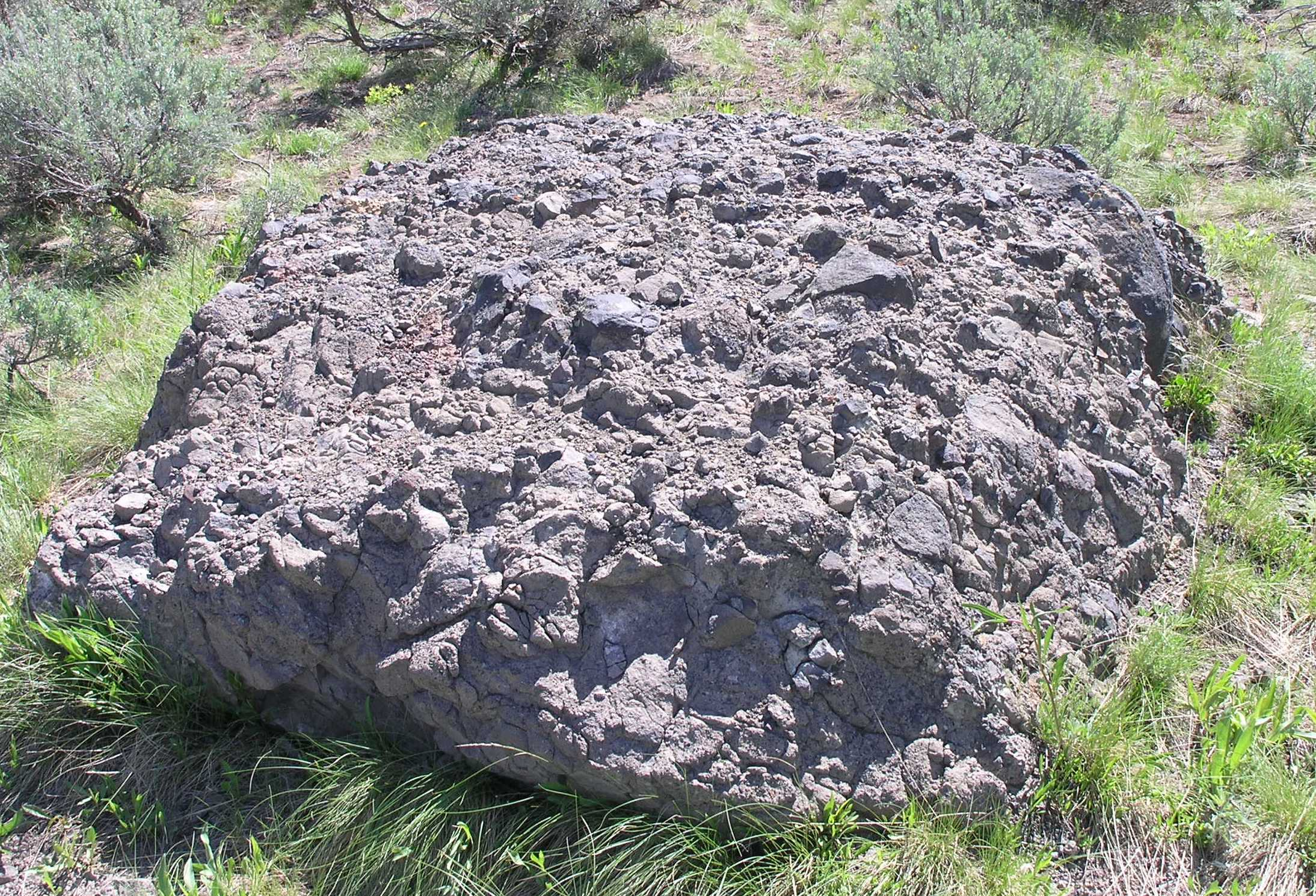
Volcanic breccia in Jackson Hole

Tephra fragments are classified by size:

- Ash – particles smaller than 2 mm (0.08 inches) in diameter
- Lapilli or volcanic cinders – between 2 and 64 mm (0.08 and 2.5 inches) in diameter
- Volcanic bombs or volcanic blocks – larger than 64 mm (2.5 inches) in diameter

Tephra consisting of very small pyroclastic rock particles in the 25–125 μm size range, invisible to the naked eye, is also called cryptotephra.

The use of tephra layers, which bear their own unique chemistry and character, as temporal marker horizons in archaeological and geological sites, is known as tephrochronology.

== Environmental effects ==
The release of tephra into the troposphere affects the environment physically and chemically. Physically, volcanic blocks damage local flora and human settlements. Ash damages communication and electrical systems, coats forests and plant life, reducing photosynthesis, and pollutes groundwater. Tephra changes below- and above-ground air and water movement. Chemically, tephra release can affect the water cycle. Tephra particles can cause ice crystals to grow in clouds, which increases precipitation. Nearby watersheds and the ocean can experience elevated mineral levels, especially iron, which can cause explosive population growth in plankton communities. This, in turn, can result in eutrophication.

== Disciplines and fossil record ==
In addition to tephrochronology, tephra is used by a variety of scientific disciplines including geology, paleoecology, anthropology, and paleontology, to date fossils, identify dates within the fossils record, and learn about prehistoric cultures and ecosystems. For example, carbonatite tephra found at Oldoinyo Lengai (a volcano in the East African Rift Valley) has buried and preserved fossilized footprints of humans near the site of the eruption. Constraints on how useful such tephra deposits can be in the fossil and archaeological record include that many tephra's do not have a defined origin, the thickness of the deposit, the material in the deposit may not have unique identifying characteristics, and deposits can be eroded or dispersed under an active water environment. However tephra deposits able to be studied have been found in Canada 330 km (210 mi) from the nearest volcano and in Siberia more than 1,100 km (680 mi) from the closest island arc volcano. Volcanic eruptions of tephra around the world have provided valuable scientific information in studies of local ecosystems and ancient cultures.

== Volcanoes ==
Clickable imagemap of notable volcanic eruptions. The apparent volume of each bubble is linearly proportional to the volume of tephra ejected, colour-coded by time of eruption as in the legend. Pink lines denote convergent boundaries, blue lines denote divergent boundaries and yellow spots denote hotspots.

Only a few of the approxiamately 30 largest explosive eruptions with a volcanic explosivity index (VEI) of 6 or more producing tephra in the last 2000 years are known from eye witnesses such as the 1883 eruption of Krakatoa or 1815 eruption of Mount Tambora and only one fully observed with ground-based, air- and satellite-borne instruments was the 1991 eruption of Mount Pinatubo. The others are known only from studies of the tephra deposits left by the eruptions. There have been many other lesser recent tephra eruptions that have been well studied such as the 2010 eruptions of Eyjafjallajökull which had a VEI of 4 that that disrupted air travel over Europe and North Atlantic, and the 2022 Hunga Tonga–Hunga Haʻapai eruption and tsunami whose VEI 5 event was well characterised. Some of the knowledge from these studies is summarised geographically below.

=== Africa ===
The Waw an Namus volcano is surrounded by an apron of dark tephra, which has a notable color contrast to the surrounding Sahara Desert.

Africa's volcanoes have had an impact on the fossil record. Geographically a part of Africa, El Hierro is a shield volcano and the youngest and smallest of the Canary Islands. The most recent El Hierro eruption occurred underwater, in 2011, and caused earthquakes and landslides throughout the Canary Islands. Instead of ash, floating rocks, 'restingolites' were released after every eruption. After the 2011 eruption, fossils of single-celled marine organisms were found in the restingolites verifying the origin theory that Canary Island growth comes from a single buoyant jet of magma from the Earth's core instead of cracks in the ocean floor. This is reflected in the decreasing age of the islands east to west from Fuerteventura to El Hierro.

There are about 60 volcanoes in Ethiopia, located in east Africa. In Southern Ethiopia, the Omo Kibish Rock Formation is composed of layers of tephra and sediment. Within these layers, several fossils have been discovered. In 1967, 2 Homo sapiens fossils were discovered in the Omo Kibish Formation by Richard Leaky, a paleoanthropologist. After radiocarbon dating, they were determined to be 195 thousand years old. Other mammals discovered in the formation include Hylochoerus meinertzhageni (forest hog) and Cephalophus (antelope).

=== Asia ===
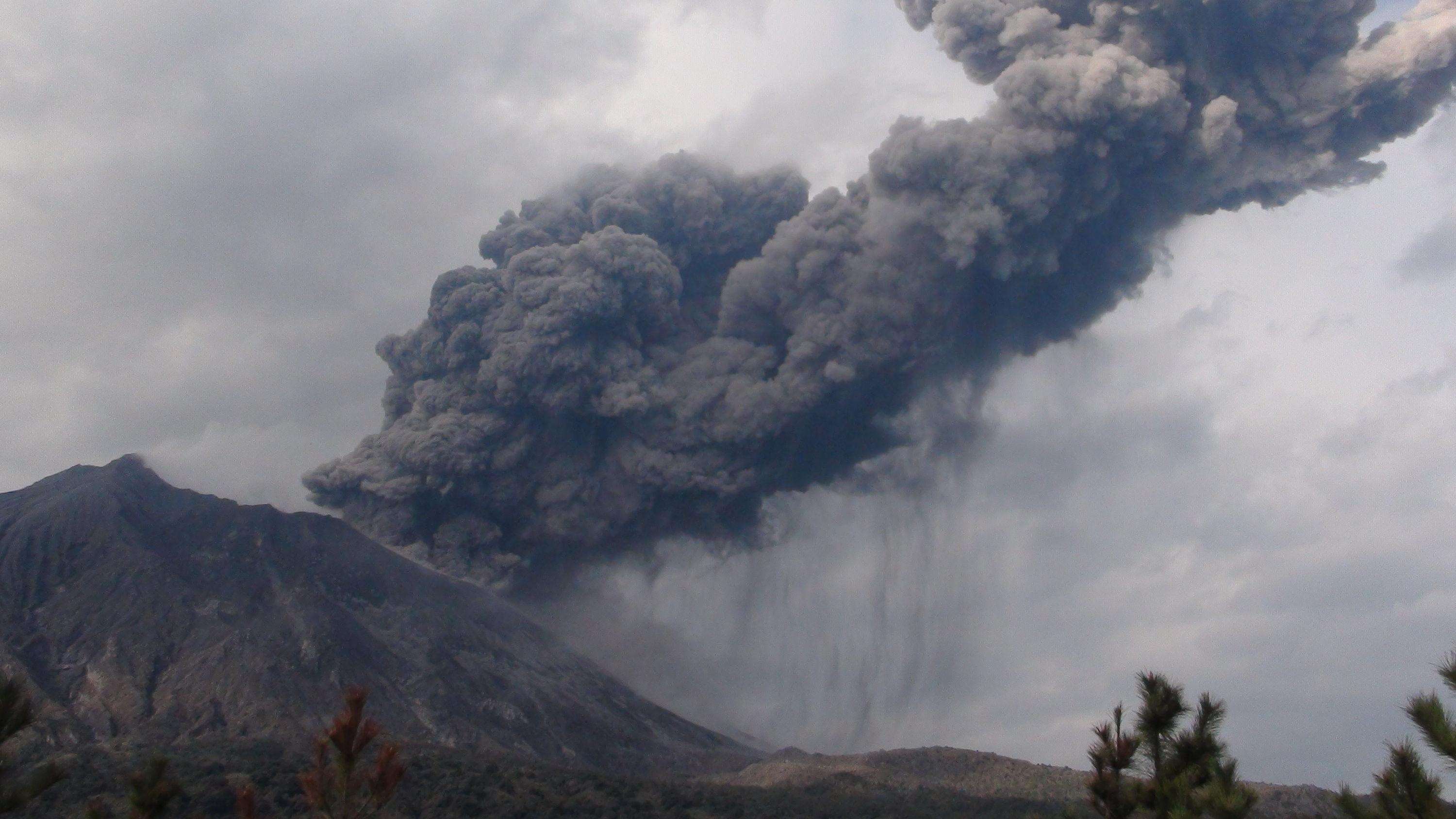
Tephra and volcanic gas erupting explosively from Sakurajima, Japan, in 2014, with some of the tephra falling back onto the ground

The Kamchatka Peninsula has the highest concentration of Quaternary calderas per unit of volcanic arc length in the world, and for example Karymsky has been linked to a VEI eruption of 6 or more that dispersed ash over more than 1,500,000 km^{2} (580,000 sq mi) about 177 thousand years ago.

Indonesia and the Philippines have had many significant tephra eruptions. The 1815 VEI 7 eruption of Mount Tambora is the largest recorded witnessed historic tephra eruption.

In Asia, several volcanic eruptions are still influencing local cultures today. In North Korea, Paektu Mountain, a stratovolcano, first erupted in 946 AD and is a religious site for locals. It last erupted in 1903. In 2017, new fossil evidence was discovered that determined the date of Paektu Mountain's first eruption, which had been a mystery. A larch tree trunk found embedded within the lava of Paektu Mountain has been subjected to radiocarbon dating; results indicate that the tree died in the last few months of 946 AD, refining the dating accuracy of the 946 AD eruption.

In northeastern China, a large volcanic eruption in the early Cretaceous caused the fossilization of an entire ecosystem known as the Jehol Biota when powerful pyroclastic flows inundated the area. The deposits include many perfectly preserved fossils of dinosaurs, birds, mammals, reptiles, fish, frogs, plants, and insects.

=== Europe ===
The VEI 6 Minoan eruption of the Santorini caldera about 1600 BC has been studied from sea bed core tephra which allowed its size to be determined, and its tephra is a marker horizon in many archaeological sites in the Eastern Mediterranean.

Mount Vesuvius, a stratovolcano located in southern Italy, last erupted in March 1944. Earlier, in 79 AD, in an eruption which lasted 12 to 18 hours, Vesuvius had covered the city of Pompeii in molten lava, tephra (ash, pumice, volcanic blocks), and toxic gases. Much of the town was preserved and organic materials fossilized by the volcanic ash, and that has provided valuable information about the Roman culture. Also, in Italy, Stromboli volcano, a stratovolcano, last erupted in July 2019.

=== Iceland ===
Although Iceland in the last 500 years has produced about a third of the total global lava output on land, its tephra contribution is less, althouh more frequent with three to four explosive eruptions for every purely effusive eruption, and these are not without impact, as in the 2010 air travel disruption from the Eyjafjallajökull eruptions.

=== Indonesia ===
Indonesia has had many significant tephra eruptions. The 1815 VEI 7 eruption of Mount Tambora is the largest recorded witnessed historic tephra eruption.

=== Japan ===
Tephra studies in Japan have characterised several large events. For example in the last 150,000 years the Ata Caldera, Aira Caldera and Kikai Caldera have had seven large eruptions with VEI of 5 or more..

=== New Zealand ===
Its larger eruptions in the last two million years have been characterised by tephra studies as resulting from specific events in the Taupō Volcanic Zone which has been the world's most productive volcanic area for the last 350,000 years. These include the most recent supereruption, being the VEI 8 Oruanui eruption of 25,700 years before present.

=== North America ===
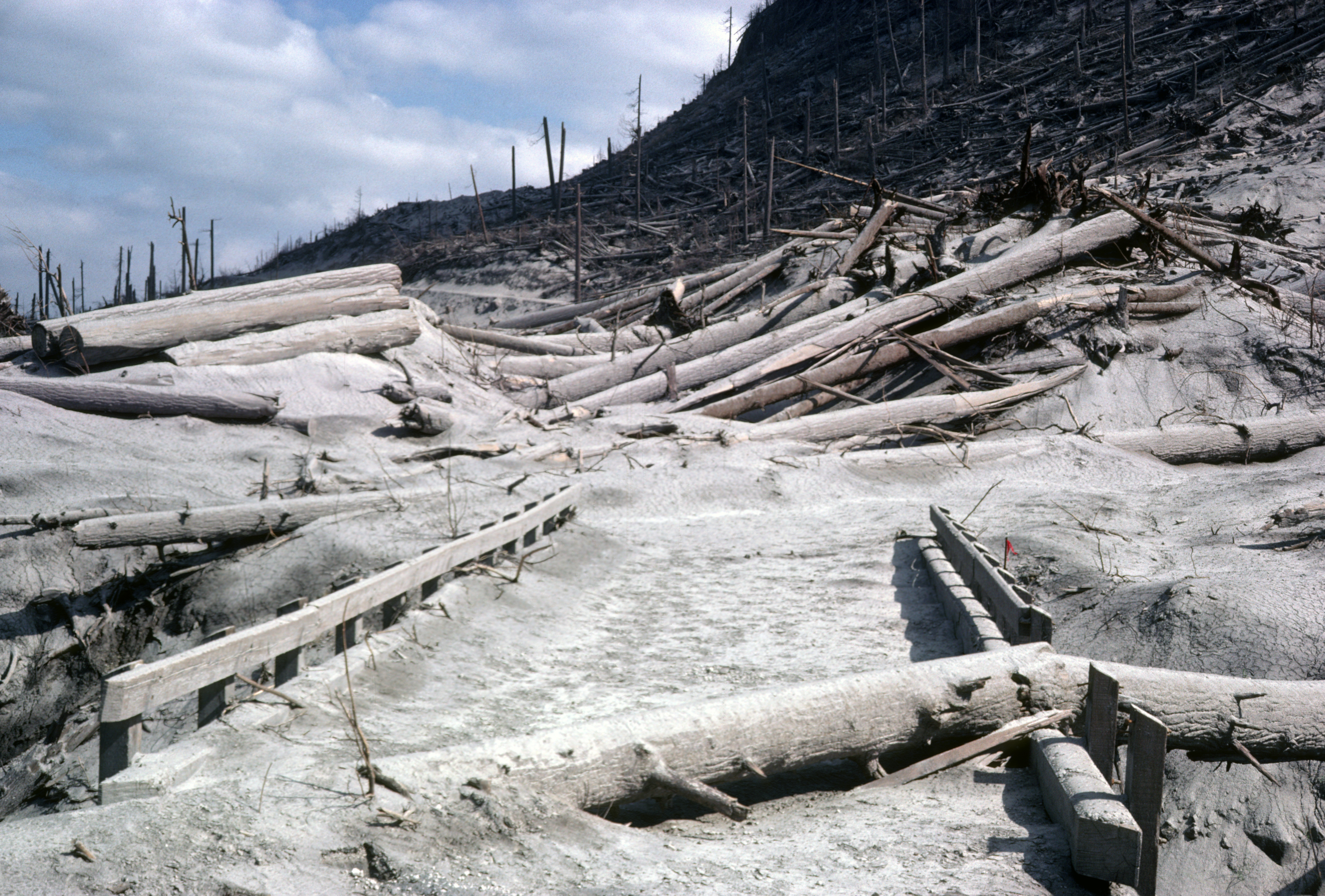
The Mount St. Helens National Volcanic Monument after the 1980 eruption

The Alaska-Aleutian volcanic arc has created from some of its eruptions tephra volumes in the range of 10 to 50 km^{3} (2.4 to 12.0 cu mi) and studies of the Old Crow tephra from about 124 thousand years ago have suggested it may have come from the Emmons Lake volcanic center.

On 18 May 1980, Mount St. Helens, a stratovolcano in Washington state, erupted, spreading five hundred million tons of tephra ash across Washington, Oregon, Montana and Idaho causing earthquakes, rockslides, and megatsunami which severely altered the topography of nearby areas. In Yellowstone National Park, eruption-related flooding caused trees to collapse and wash into lake beds where they fossilized. Nearby forests were flooded, removing bark, leaves, and tree limbs.

In 2006, the Augustine Volcano in Alaska erupted generating earthquakes, avalanches, and projected tephra ash approximately two hundred and ninety kilometers away. This dome volcano is over forty thousand years old and has erupted 11 times since 1800.

=== Philippines ===
Mount Pinatubo is known for its 1991 VEI 6 eruption which was the second largest tephra eruption of the twentieth century. The Philippines has many other active and inactive tephra producing volcanoes.

=== South America ===
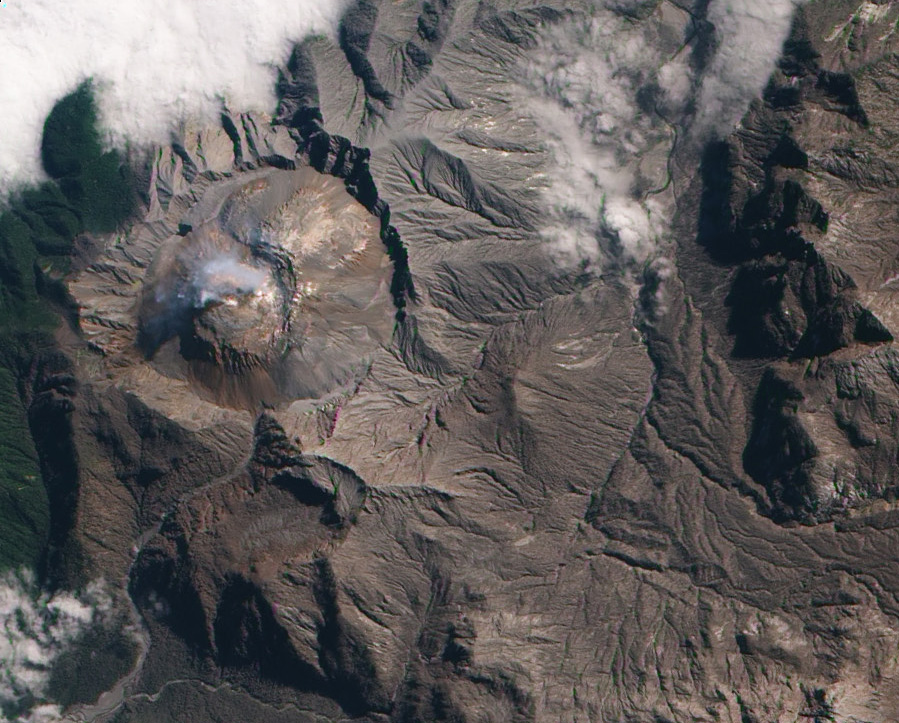
Satellite image of Chaitén volcano lava dome, Chile: The circular dome is brown and is surrounded by an ash covered landscape.

In southern Chile, the Chaitén volcano erupted in 2011 adding 160 meters to its rim. Prehistoric weapons and tools, formed from obsidian tephra blocks, were dated at 5,610 years ago and were discovered 400 km away. Due to the location of the subduction zone of the eastern Pacific's Nazca Plate, there are twenty one active volcanoes in southern Peru. In 2006, fossils, found under a layer of volcanic ash in Peru, were excavated by a team of paleontologists led by Mark D. Uhen, professor at George Mason University. The fossils were identified as 3 different types of archaeocetes, prehistoric whales, and are older than 36.61 million years which, as of 2011, makes them South America's oldest whale fossils.
