= Okinawa plate =

Minor tectonic plate from the northern end of Taiwan to the southern tip of Kyūshū

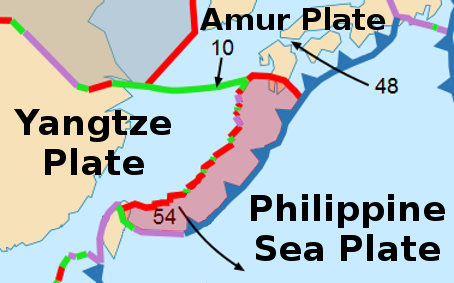
- Type: Minor
- Movement^{1}: south-east
- Speed^{1}: 54mm/year
- Features: Ryukyu Islands, Kagoshima Prefecture (Ōsumi Peninsula, Satsuma Peninsula), Taiwan (New Taipei City, Keelung City, Yilan County), East China Sea, Kagoshima Bay, Okinawa Trough
- ^{1}Relative to the African plate

The Okinawa plate, or Okinawa platelet, is a minor continental tectonic plate in the northern and eastern hemispheres stretching from the northern end of Taiwan to the southern tip of the island of Kyūshū. The Okinawa plate hosts typical earthquakes, like the 1911 Kikai Island earthquake, and various types of slow earthquakes, including low frequency earthquakes, very low frequency earthquakes, tremor, and slow slip events.

== Boundaries ==
The eastern side of the Okinawa plate forms a convergent boundary with the Philippine Sea plate, forming the Ryukyu Trench and the island arc that forms the Ryukyu Islands. The Okinawa plate is bounded on the western side by the Okinawa Trough, a back arc basin and divergent boundary with the Yangtze plate. A section of the southern boundary between the Okinawa plate and the Philippine Sea plate is a former subduction zone that now accommodates oblique slip and was the location of the 1771 Great Yaeyama Tsunami. The northern side of the Okinawa plate is bordered by the Amur Plate.
