= Amur plate =

Minor tectonic plate in eastern Asia

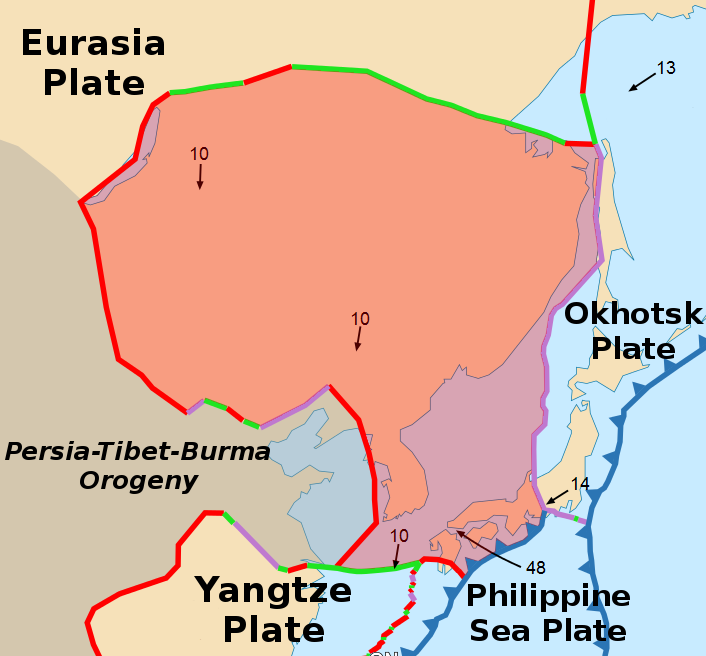
- Type: Minor
- Movement^{1}: South
- Speed^{1}: 10 mm/year
- Features: Amur, Yalu, Korea, Manchuria, Lake Baikal, Sea of Japan, southwest Honshu (Kansai, Chūgoku), Shikoku, most of Kyushu
- ^{1}Relative to the African plate

The Amur plate (or Amurian plate; also occasionally referred to as the China plate, not to be confused with the Yangtze plate) is a minor tectonic plate in the northern and eastern hemispheres. In the PB2002 global plate model, the Amur plate covers about 0.131 steradians, roughly 5.3×10^{6} km^{2} (2.0×10^{6} sq mi).

The Amurian Plate is named after the Amur River, which forms the border between the Russian Far East and Northeast China. It is bounded on the north, west, and southwest by the Eurasian plate, on the east by the Okhotsk plate, to the southeast by the Philippine Sea plate along the Suruga Trough and the Nankai Trough, and the Okinawa plate, and the Yangtze plate.

The Amurian Plate may have been involved in the 1975 Haicheng earthquake and the 1976 Tangshan earthquake in China.

== Boundaries ==
The Amurian microplate is a division within the Eurasian plate, with an unknown western boundary, defined on the south by the Qinling suture zone in central China and the Baikal Rift Zone and Stanovoy Mountains on the north.

The Baikal Rift Zone is considered a boundary between the Amurian Plate and the Eurasian plate. GPS measurements indicate that the plate is slowly rotating counterclockwise. The boundary with the Okhotsk Plate is the eastern margin of the Sea of Japan.

== Geography ==
It covers northeastern China, the Korean Peninsula, the Sea of Japan, Shikoku, Kyushu, southwest Honshu (Kansai, Chūgoku), eastern Mongolia and the south of Russian Far East.

== See also ==
- North China Craton
