= Mount Takachiho =

Japanese mountain

Takachiho-no-mine
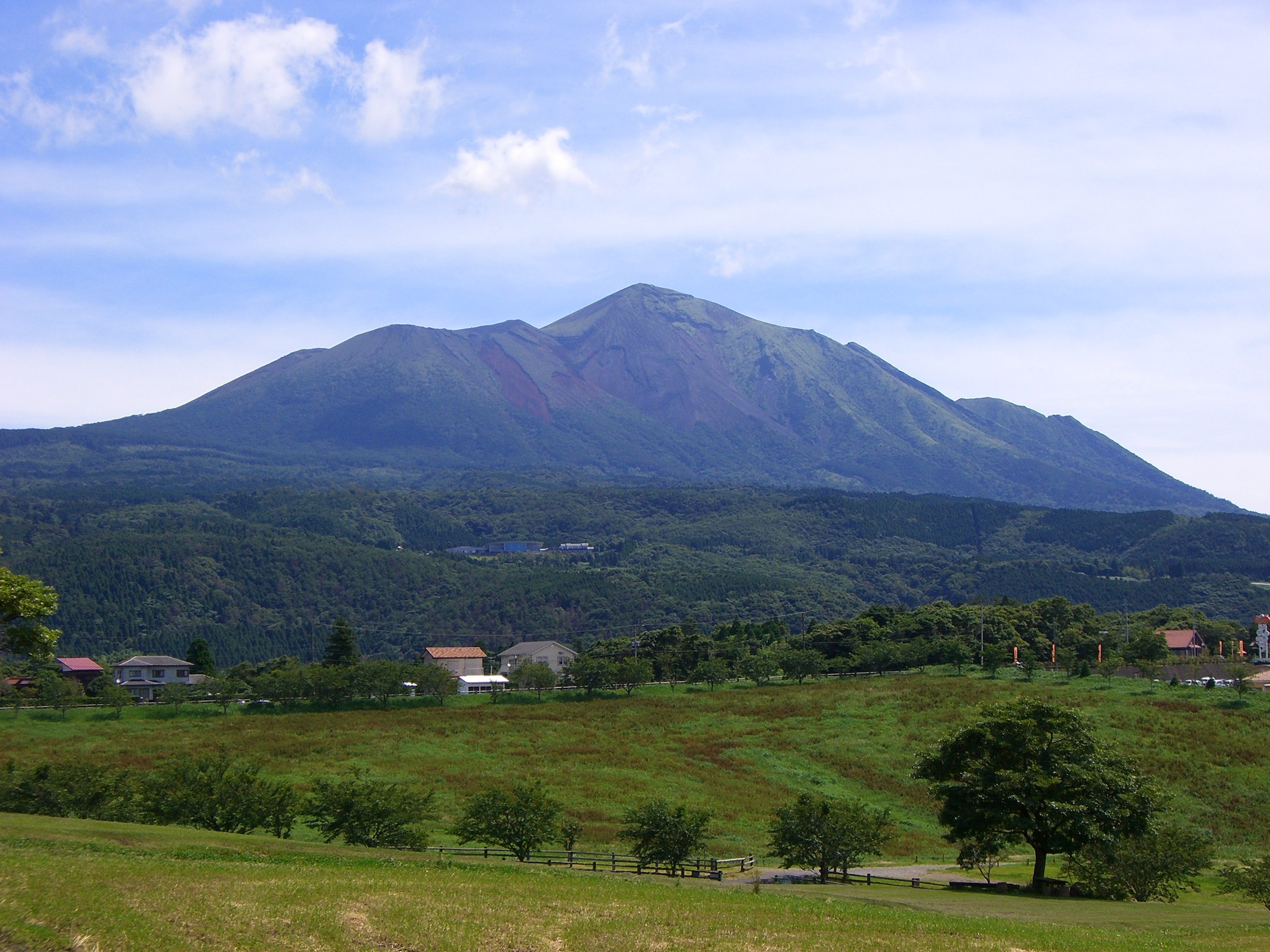
- South Face, seen from Takachiho Farm

Highest point
- Elevation: 1,573.36 m (5,161.9 ft)
- Coordinates: 31°53′10″N 130°55′09″E

Geography
- Country: Japan

Geology
- Rock age: Pleistocene
- Mountain type: Stratovolcano (active)
- Rock type: Andesite

Takachiho-no-mine (高千穂峰) or Mt. Takachiho (1573m) is a volcano in Kagoshima and Miyazaki Prefectures, Japan. It is part of Kirishima-Kinkowan National Park, where it is the second highest peak in the Kirishima range.

Mt. Takachicho is a stratovolcano, flanked by the Ohachi volcano to the west and Futago-ishi volcano to the east. While the Ohachi vent has been active with major eruptions in 788 CE and 1235 CE, it last had a minor eruption in 1913.

== Shinto Myth ==
According to the Nihon Shoki, it was on the peak of Mt. Takachiho that Ninigi-no-Mikoto, grandson of supreme deity Amaterasu, first descended onto earth. Today, the peak features a replica of the legendary halberd Ame-no-sakahoko (天逆鉾), the inverted spear of heaven, said to have been thrust into the mountain by Ninigi.

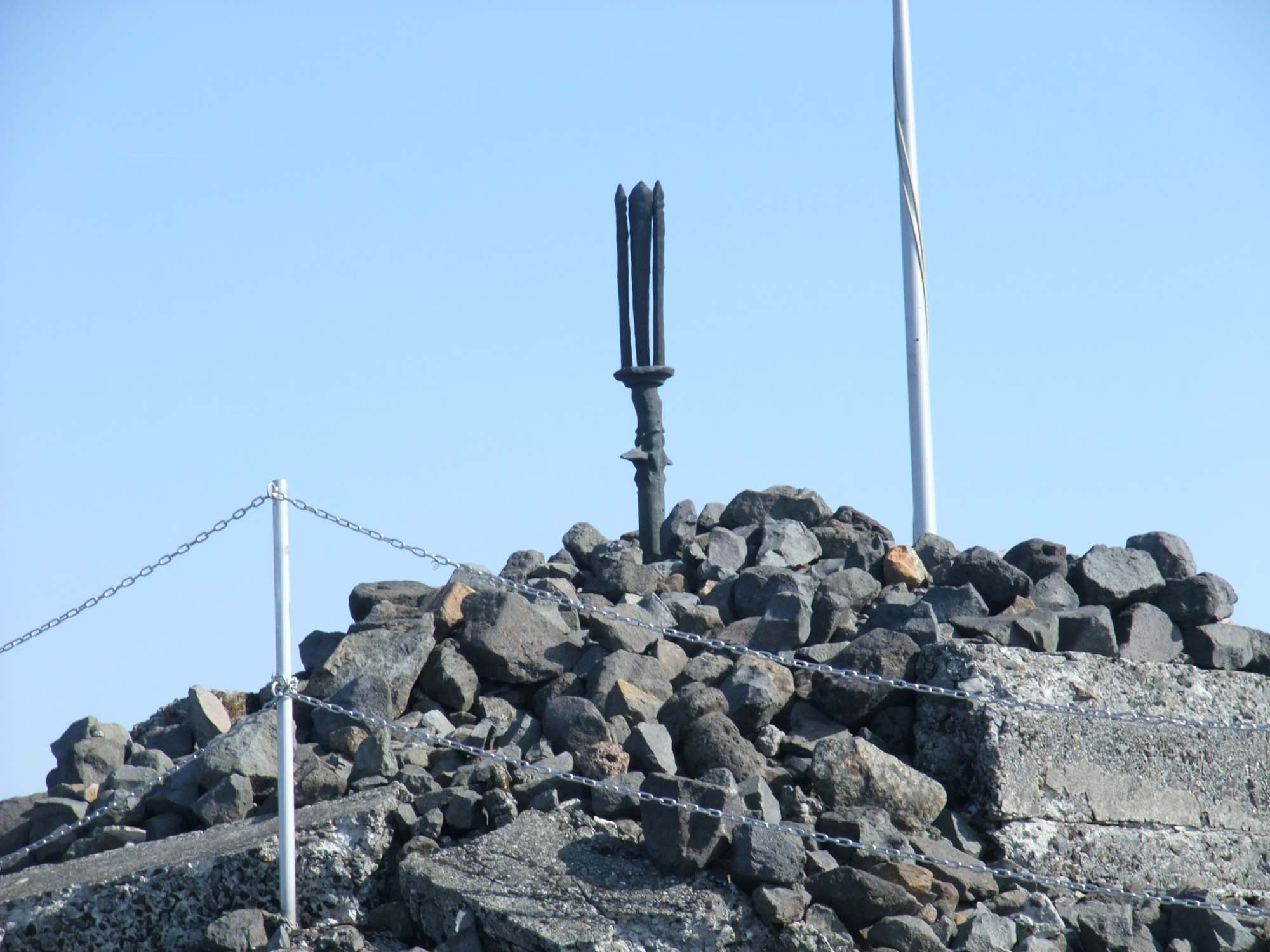
Ame-no-sakahoko, the inverted spear of heaven, visible on the peak today

According to legend, three generations of Ninigis descendants continued living in the area until Jimmu set out to conquer the Yamato plain, thus becoming the legendary first emperor of Japan.

The nearby Kirishima Shrine still enshrines these intermediary generations as Kami. It used to stand directly at the base of Mt. Takachiho but was repeatedly damaged by eruptions of the Ochachi flank and then moved. The old shrine's remains can still be seen at Takachiho-gawara, which nowadays also functions as the trailhead to Mt. Takachiho.

== Images ==
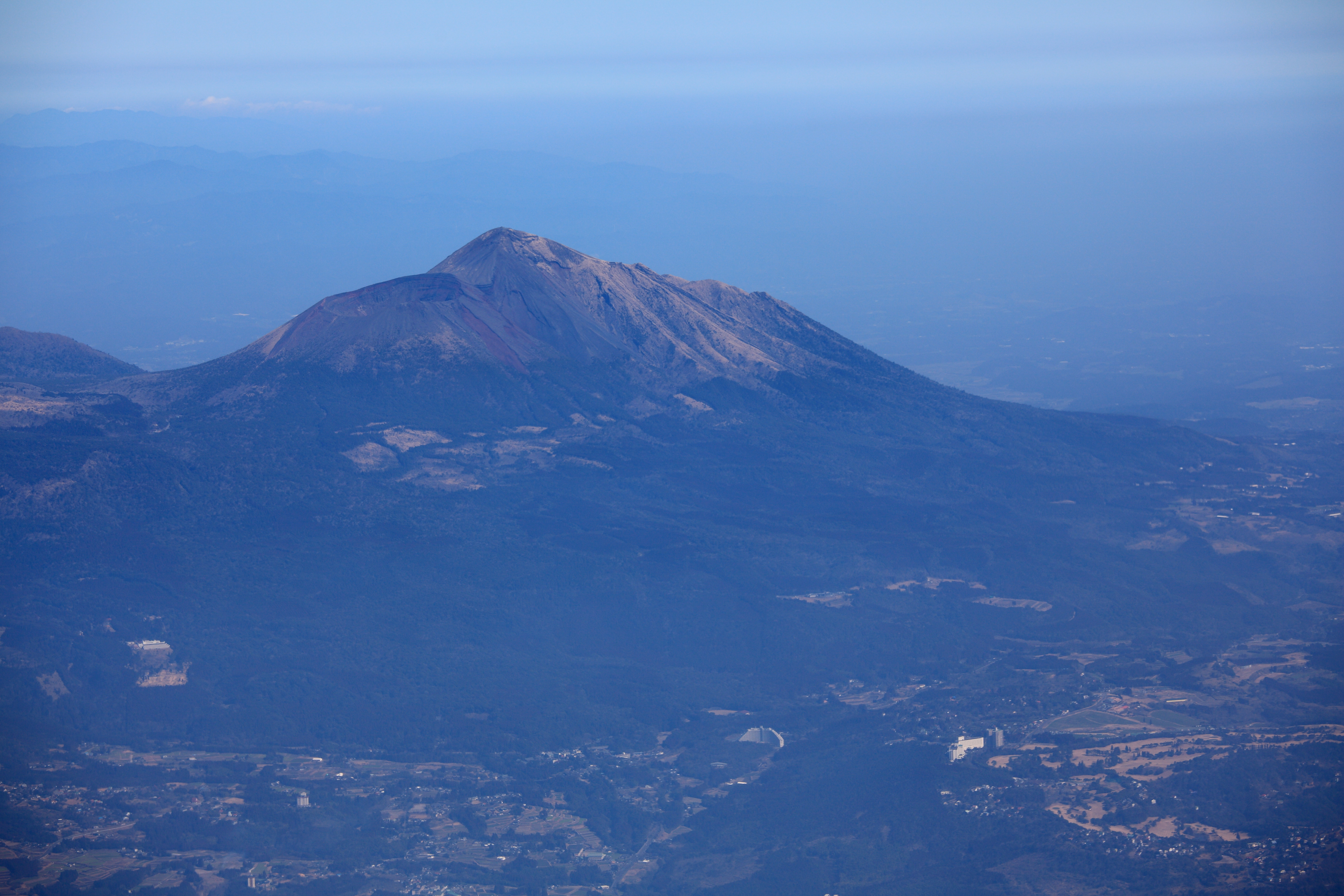
View from Southwest

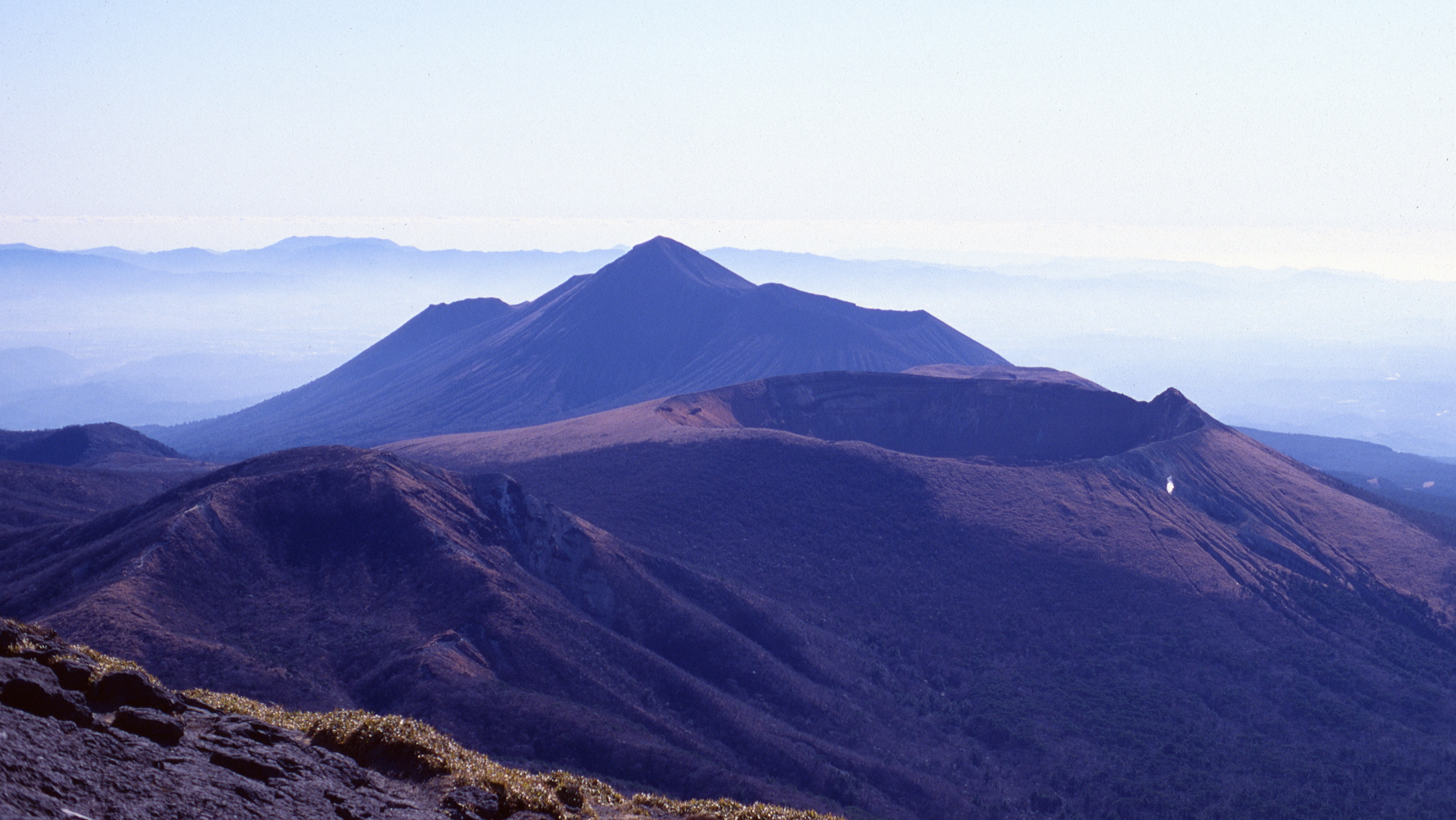
View from Mt. Karakuni beyond Shinmoedake, 1998

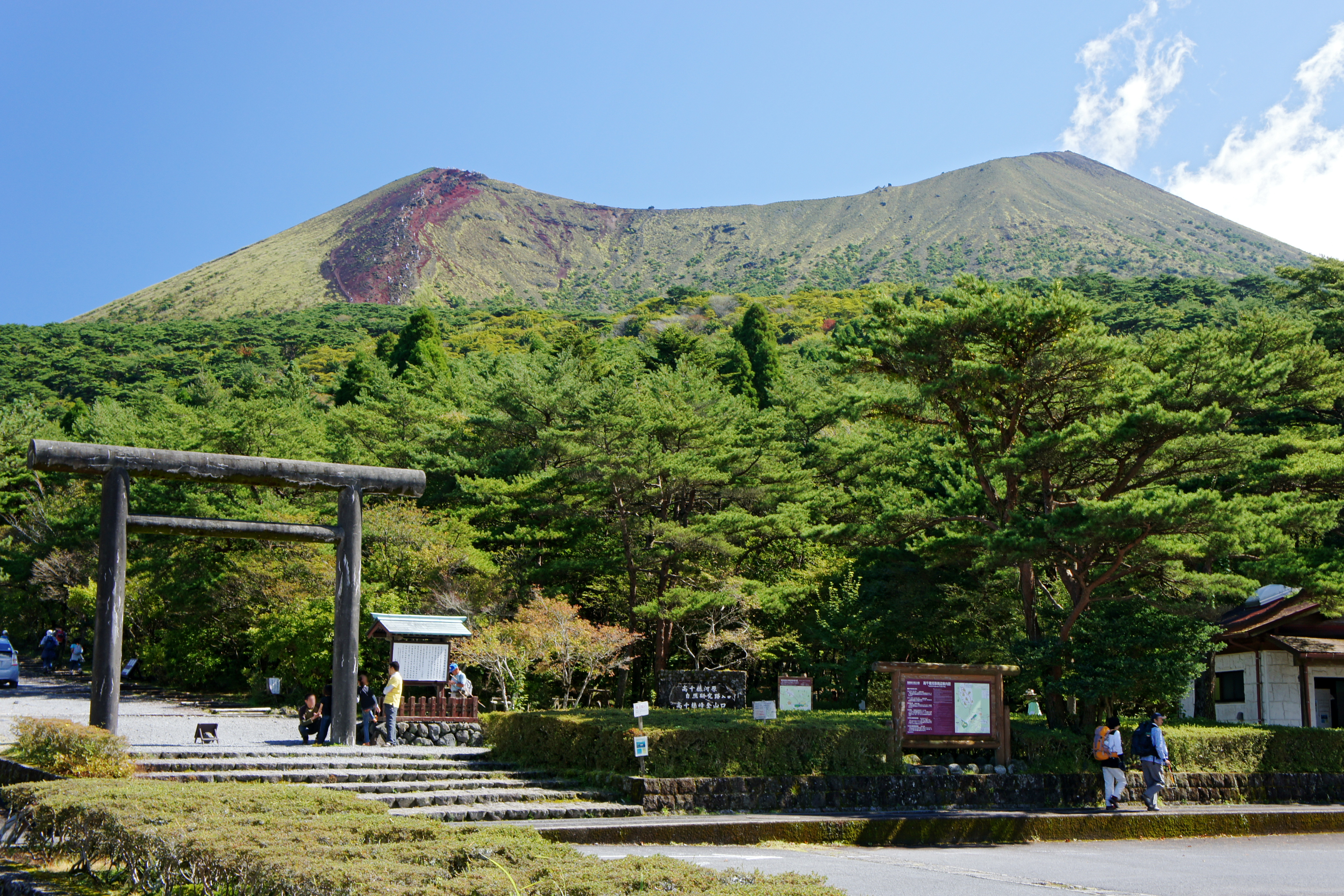
View from Takachiho-gawara from the south

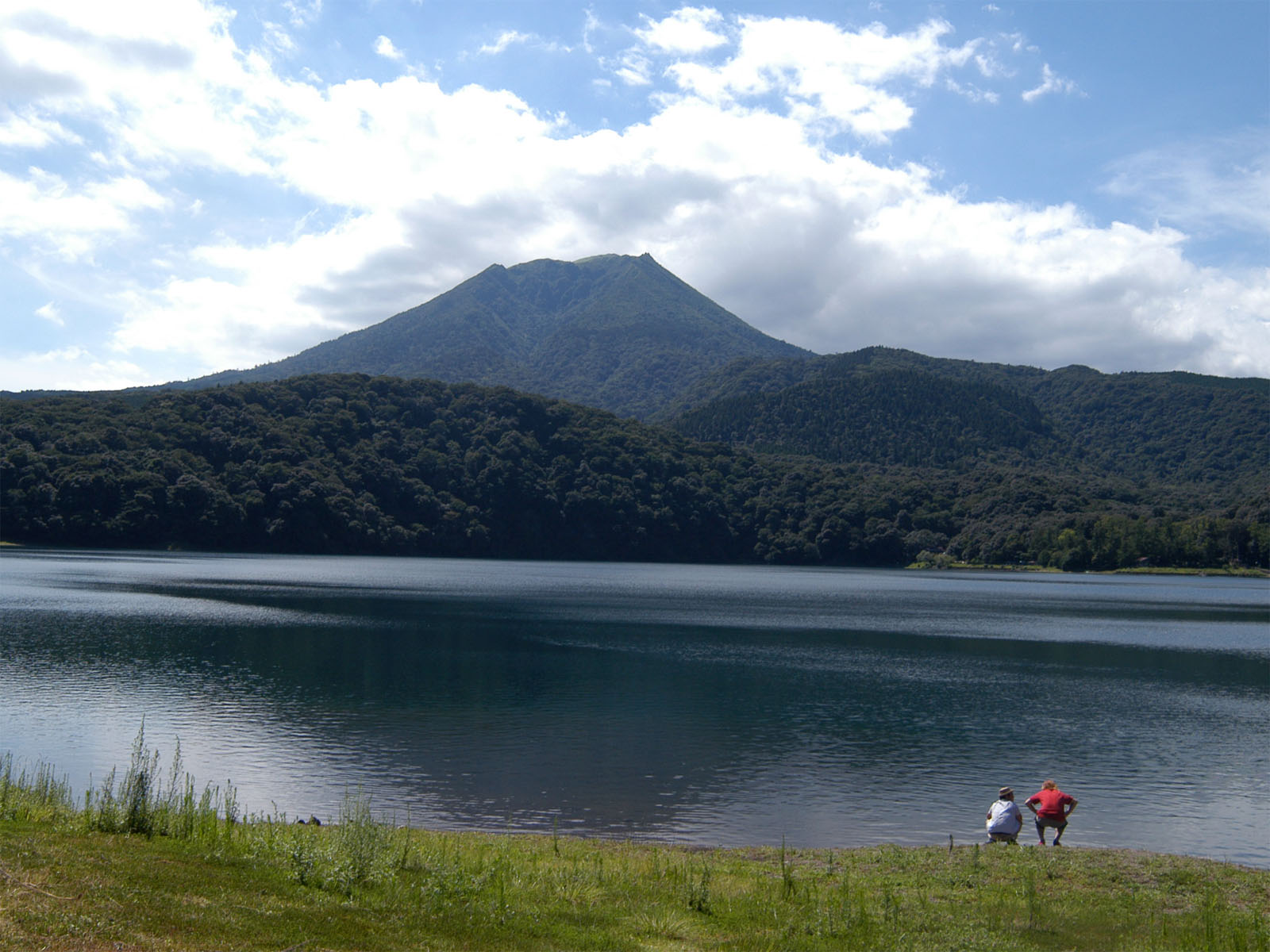
View from Lake Miike from the east

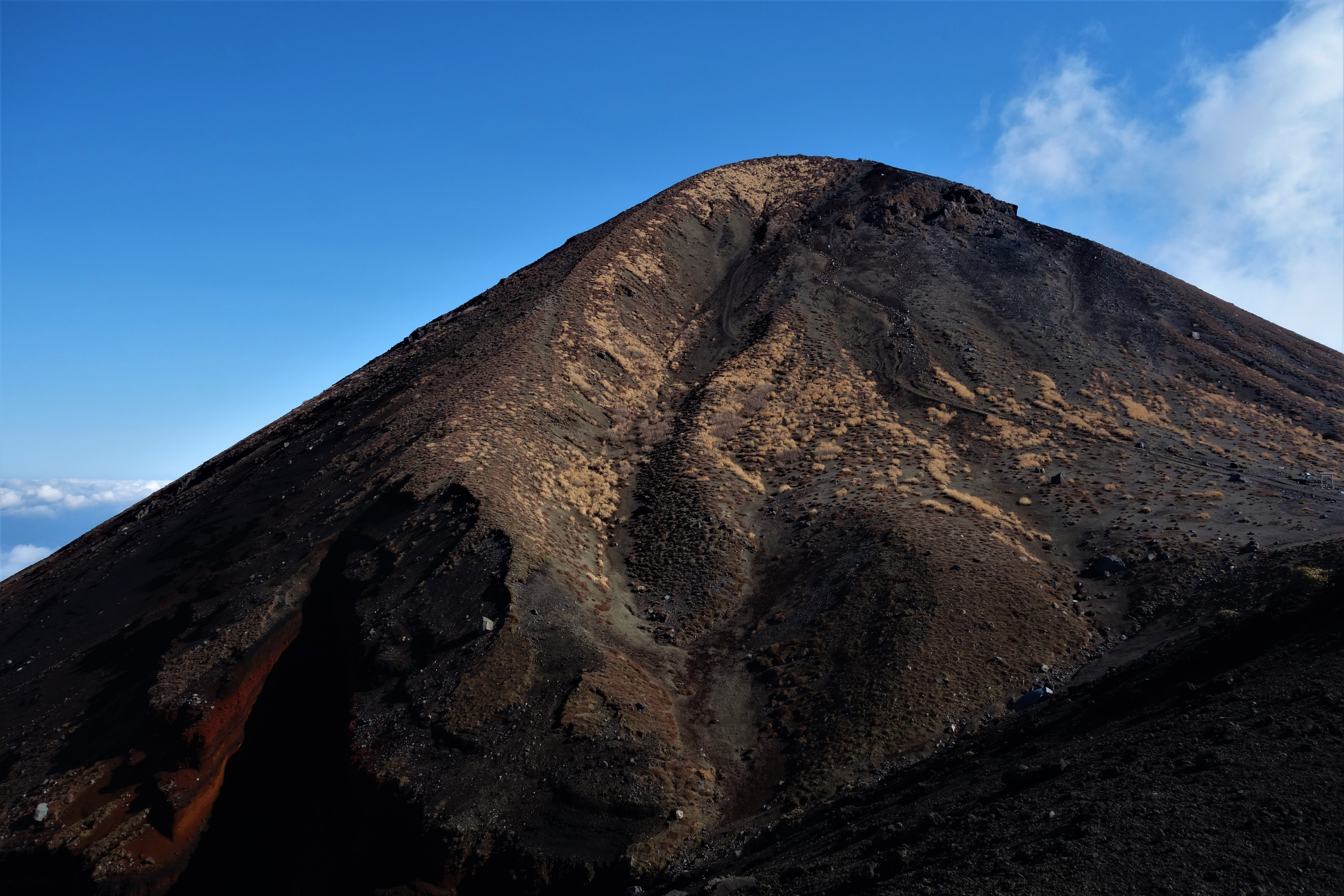
View of peak from Ohachi crater

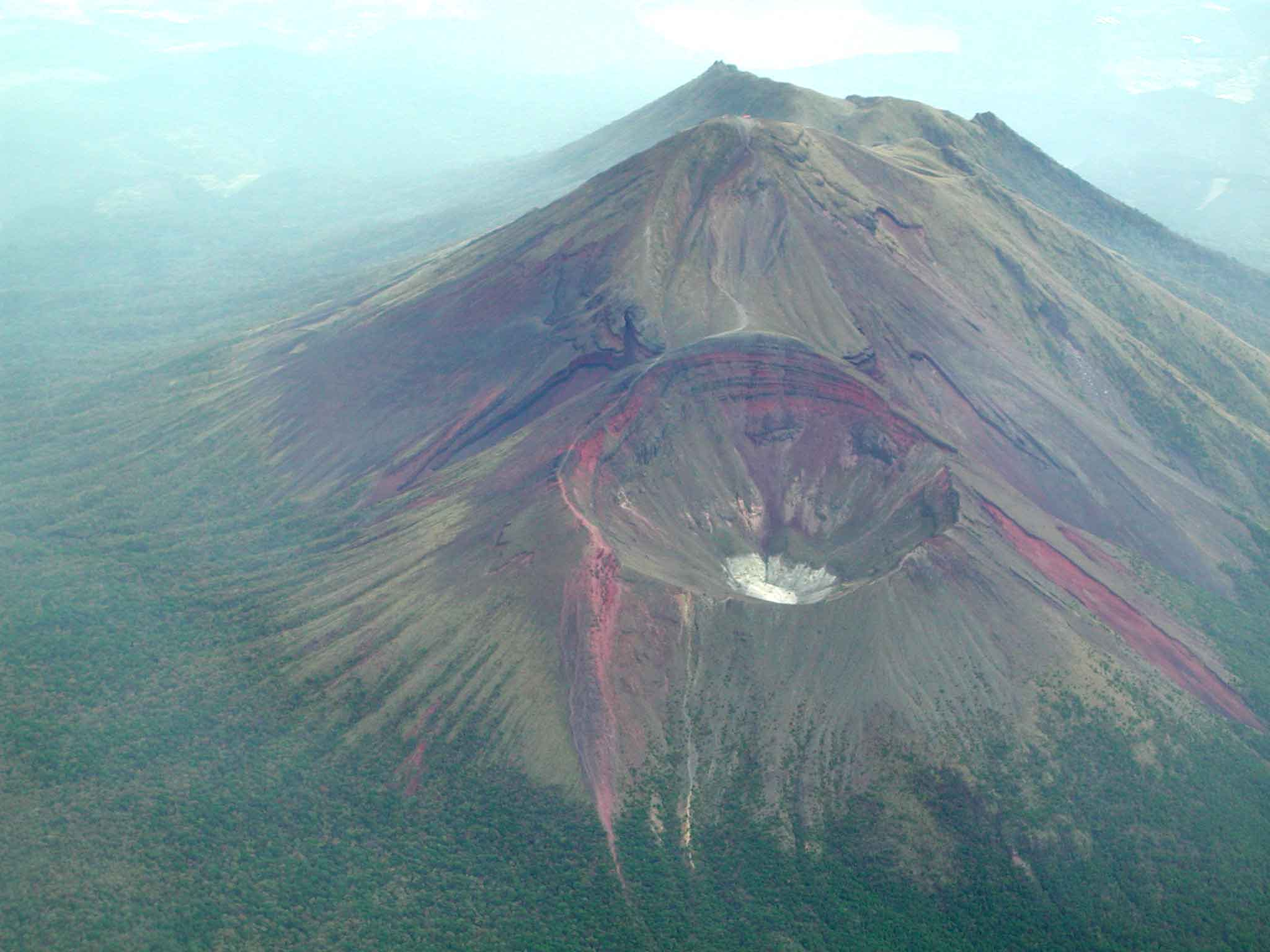
View from the south, with Ohachi crater in the foreground
