= Etymology of Shinto =

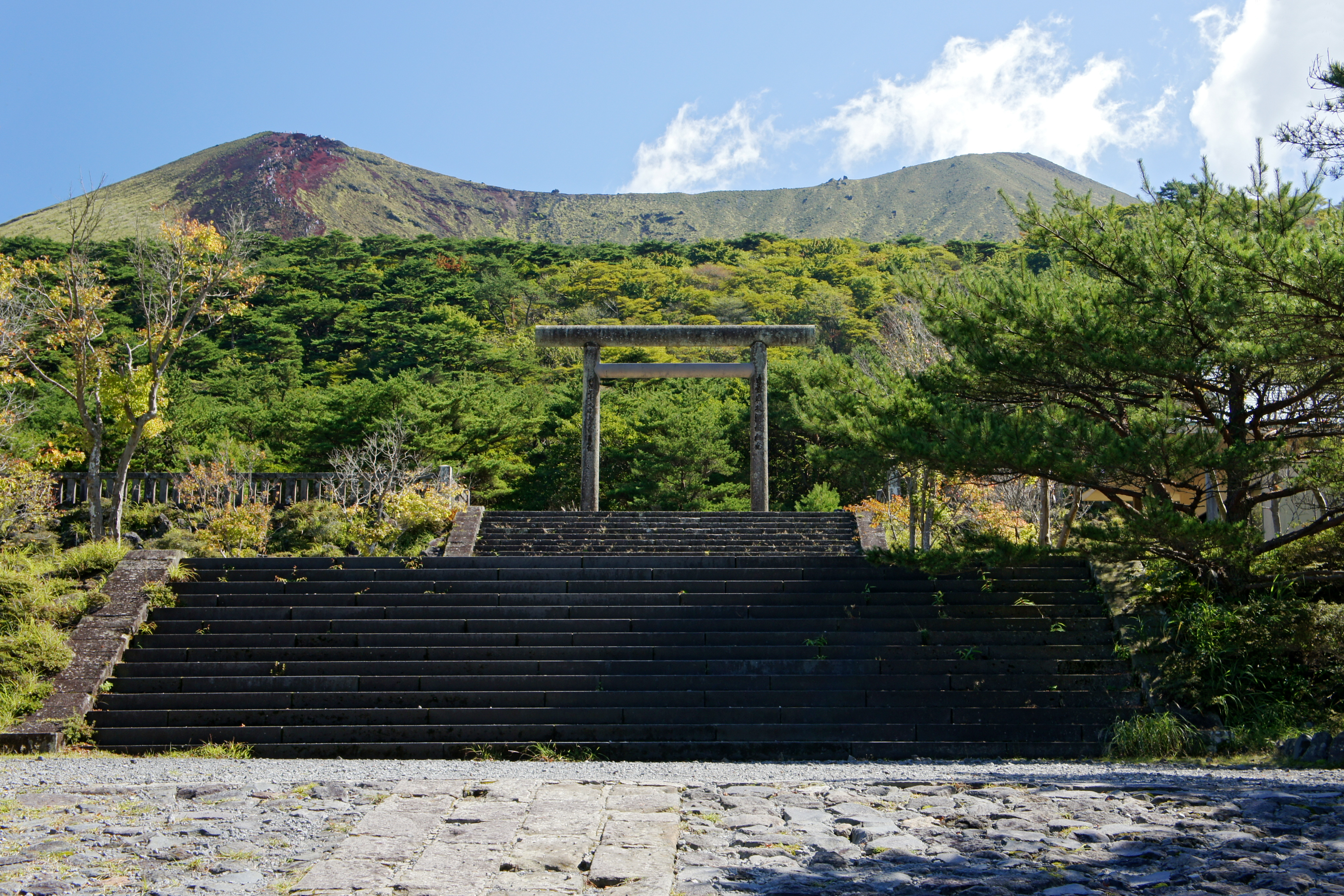
A torii gate at the Takachiho-gawara shrine near Kirishima, Kagoshima Prefecture, which is associated with the mythological tale of Ninigi-no-Mikoto's descent to earth.

The term Shinto, which now refers to a Japanese religion, derives ultimately from Chinese.

== Basis ==
The term Shinto is often broadly translated into English as "the way of the kami", although its meaning has varied throughout Japanese history. Other terms are sometimes used synonymously with "Shinto"; these include kami no michi (神の道, "the way of the kami"), kannagara no michi (神ながらの道, also written 随神の道 or 惟神の道, "the way of the kami from time immemorial"), Kodō (古道, "the ancient way"), Daidō (大道, "the great way"), and Teidō (帝道, "the imperial way").

== Historical development ==
The term Shinto derives from the combination of two Chinese characters: shin (神), which means "spirit" or "god", and tō (道), which means "way", "road" or "path". "Shintō" (神道, "the Way of the Gods") was a term already used in the Book of Changes referring to the divine order of nature. Around the time of the spread of Buddhism in the Han dynasty (206 BCE – 220 CE), it was used to distinguish indigenous Chinese religions from the imported religion. Ge Hong used it in his Baopuzi as a synonym for Taoism.

The Chinese term 神道 (MC zyin daw^{X}) was originally adopted into Japanese as Jindō; this was possibly first used as a Buddhist term to refer to non-Buddhist deities. Among the earliest known appearances of the term Shinto in Japan is in the 8th-century text, Nihon Shoki. Here, it may be a generic term for popular belief, or alternatively reference Taoism, as many Taoist practices had recently been imported from mainland Asia. In these early Japanese uses, the word Shinto did not apply to a distinct religious tradition nor to anything uniquely Japanese; the 11th century Konjaku monogatarishui for instance refers to a woman in China practicing Shinto, and also to people in India worshipping kami, indicating these terms were being used to describe religions outside Japan itself.

In medieval Japan, kami-worship was generally seen as being part of Japanese Buddhism, with the kami themselves often interpreted as Buddhas. At this point, the term Shinto increasingly referred to "the authority, power, or activity of a kami, being a kami, or, in short, the state or attributes of a kami." It appears in this form in texts such as Nakatomi no harai kunge and Shintōshū tales. In the Japanese Portuguese Dictionary of 1603, Shinto is defined as referring to "kami or matters pertaining to kami." The term Shinto became common in the 15th century. During the late Edo period, the kokugaku scholars began using the term Shinto to describe what they believed was an ancient, enduring and indigenous Japanese tradition that predated Buddhism; they argued that Shinto should be used to distinguish kami worship from traditions like Buddhism, Taoism, and Confucianism. This use of the term Shinto became increasingly popular from the 18th century. The term Shinto has been commonly used only since the early 20th century, when it superseded the term taikyō ('great religion') as the name for the Japanese state religion. In English, the religion is also called "Shintoism", although some scholars have argued against the inclusion of the suffix -ism due to Shinto's lack of codified doctrine.
