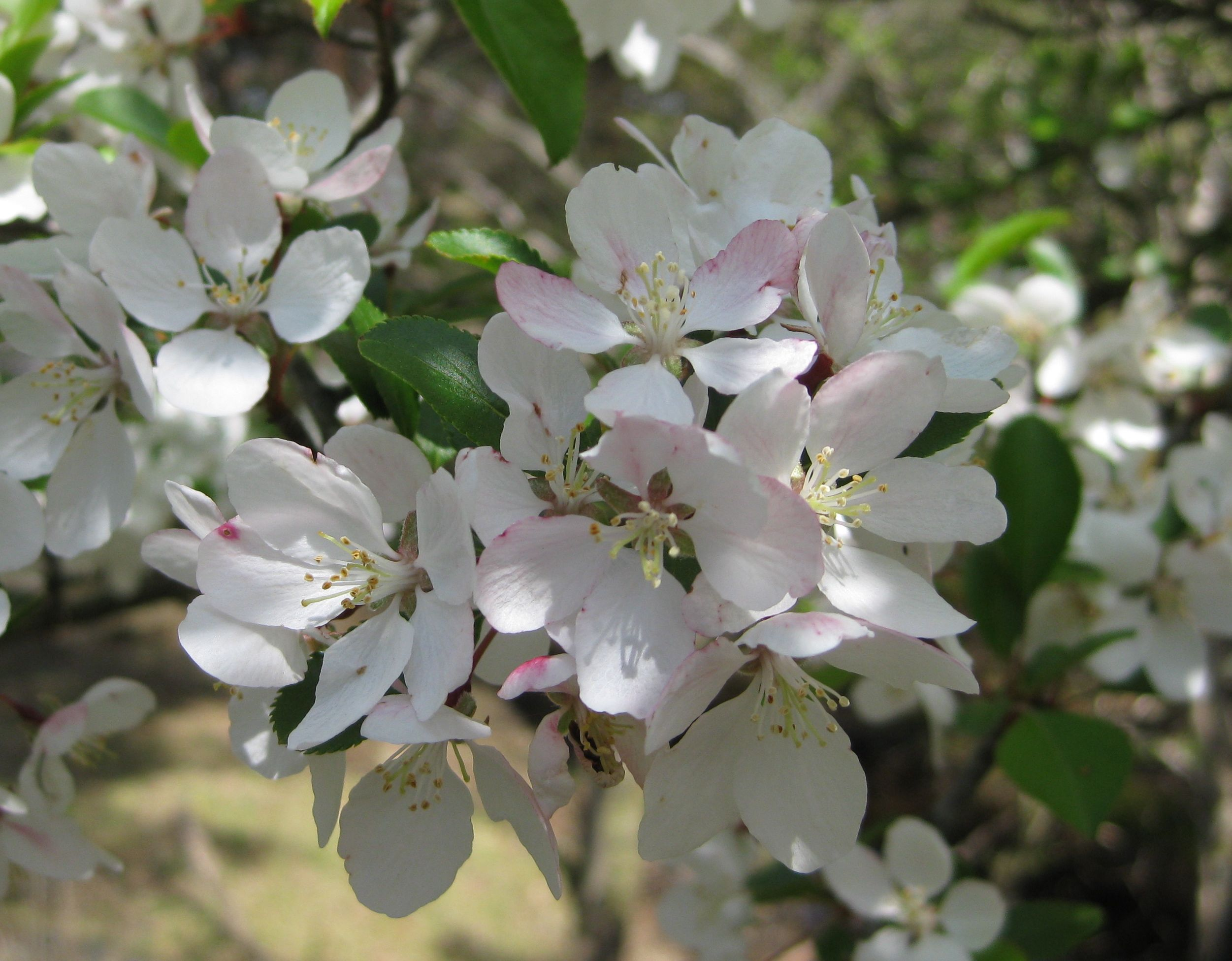
- Close-up of flowers
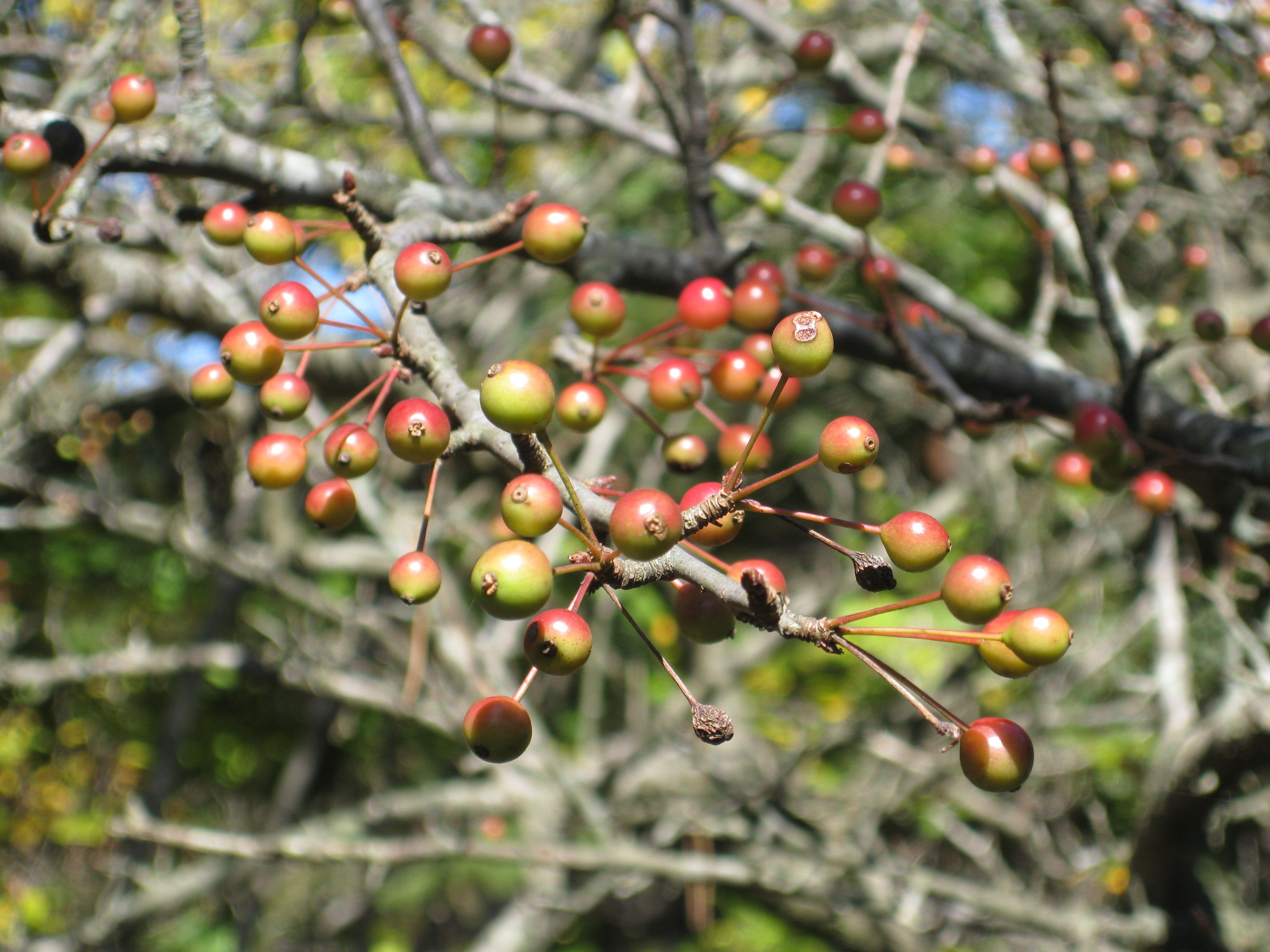
- Fruit

Conservation status
- Critically Endangered (IUCN 3.1)

Scientific classification
- Kingdom: Plantae
- Clade: Embryophytes
- Clade: Tracheophytes
- Clade: Angiosperms
- Clade: Eudicots
- Clade: Rosids
- Order: Rosales
- Family: Rosaceae
- Genus: Malus
- Species: M. spontanea

Binomial name
- Malus spontanea (Makino) Makino

Synonyms
- Homotypic Synonyms: Malus × floribunda var. spontanea Makino; Malus halliana var. spontanea (Makino) Koidz.; Sinomalus spontanea (Makino) Rushforth

= Malus spontanea =

Species of flowering plant

Malus spontanea, the nokaidō, is a species of crabapple in the family Rosaceae. It is found only in the Ebino-kōgen high plateau of the Kirishima volcanic complex of Kyushu, Japan. It is closely related to Malus halliana, currently found in the wild in China, and considered possibly originally native to Japan. Fewer than 300 individuals survive in the wild.
