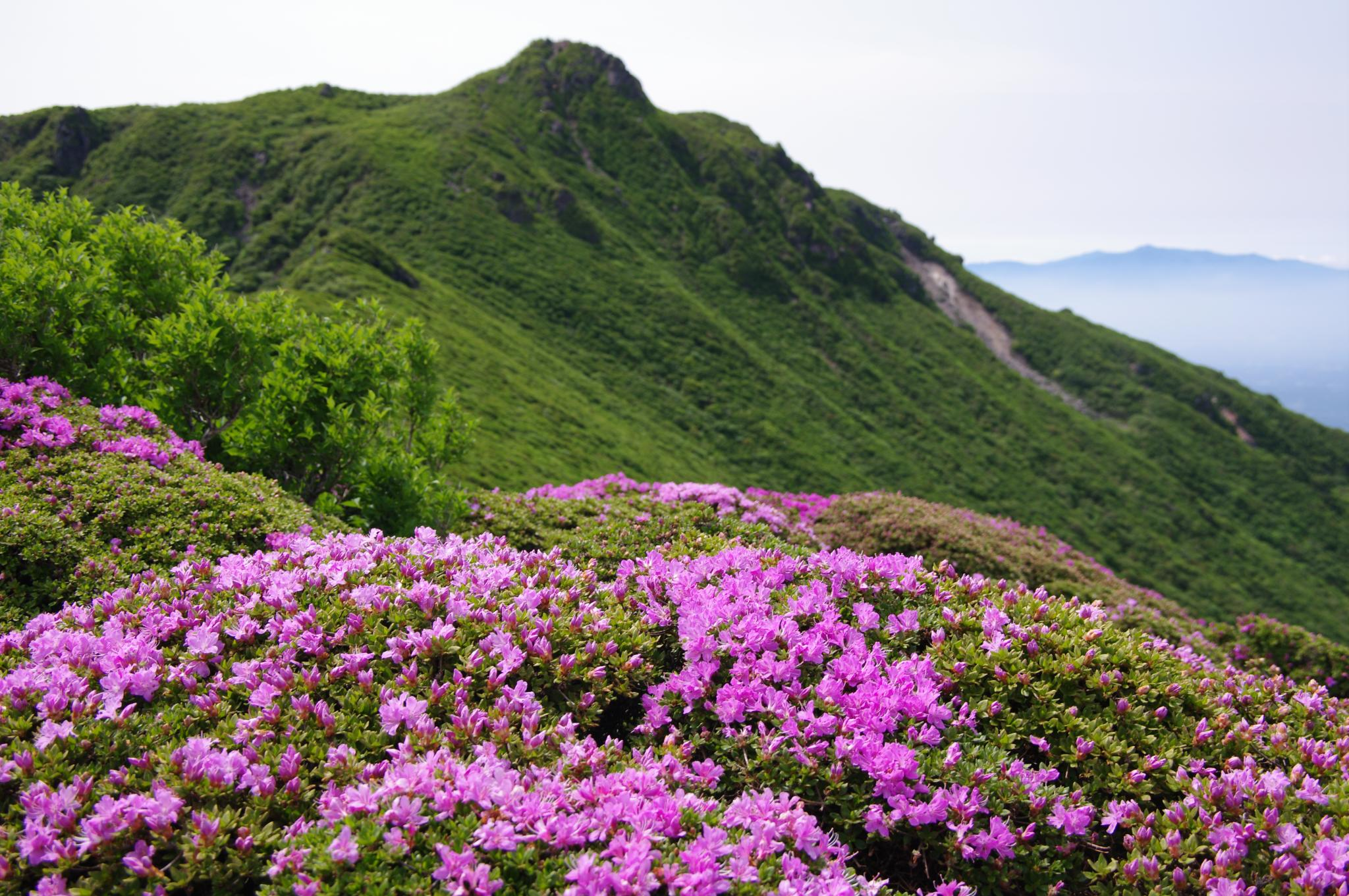
- In bloom on the slopes of Mount Taisen, a volcano in Aso Kujū National Park
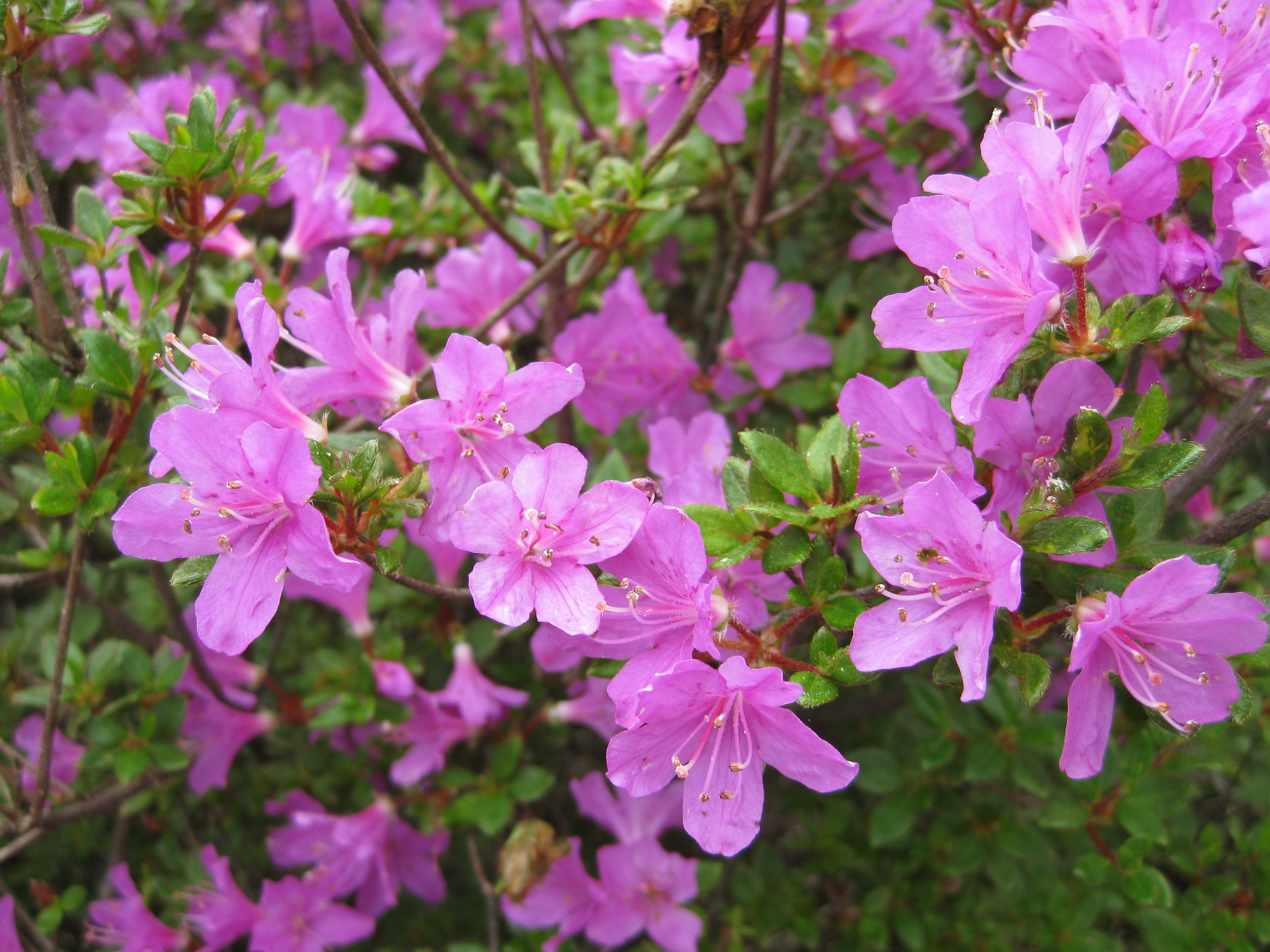
- Close up of flowers on the Ebino Plateau

Scientific classification
- Kingdom: Plantae
- Clade: Embryophytes
- Clade: Tracheophytes
- Clade: Spermatophytes
- Clade: Angiosperms
- Clade: Eudicots
- Clade: Asterids
- Order: Ericales
- Family: Ericaceae
- Genus: Rhododendron
- Species: R. kiusianum

Binomial name
- Rhododendron kiusianum Makino

Synonyms
- Homotypic Synonyms: Rhododendron × amoenum var. japonicum (Maxim.) Bean; Rhododendron indicum f. japonicum Maxim.; Rhododendron indicum var. japonicum (Maxim.) Makino; Rhododendron kaempferi var. japonicum (Maxim.) Rehder; Rhododendron obtusum f. japonicum (Maxim.) E.H.Wilson; Rhododendron obtusum var. japonicum (Maxim.) Kitam.; Heterotypic Synonyms: Rhododendron kiusianum f. albiflorum Honda & Maeda; Rhododendron kiusianum f. maedae Honda

= Rhododendron kiusianum =

Species of flowering plant

Rhododendron kiusianum, the Kyushu azalea or Miyama-Kirishima, is a species of flowering plant in the family Ericaceae, native to Kyushu, Japan. It is a parent of a large number of hybrid dwarf azaleas, drawn from the naturally occurring Kurume azaleas used in bonsai. It is the official flower of Unzen, Nagasaki, and of Kagoshima Prefecture.
