= Ebino Plateau =

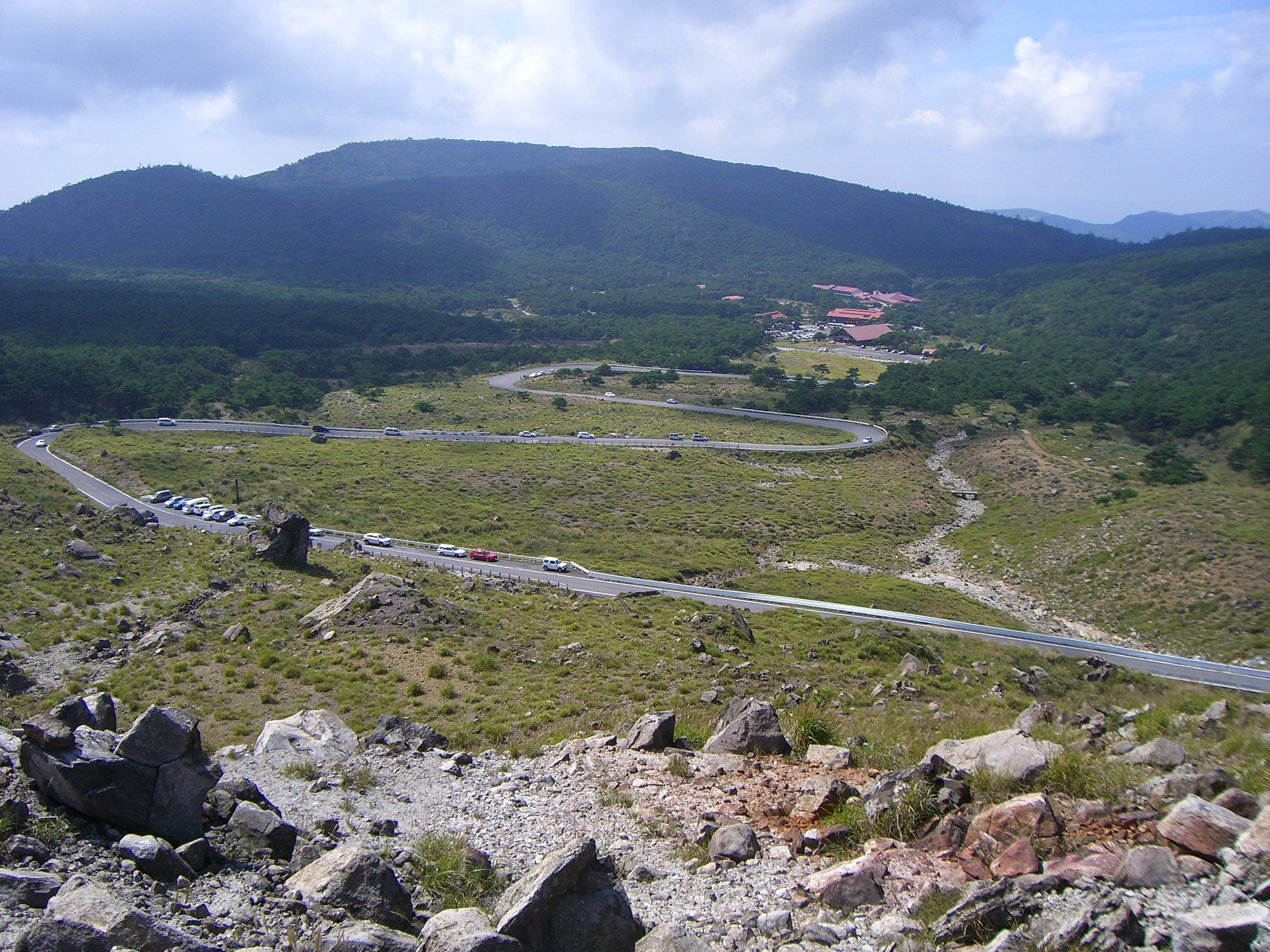
The main road leading to Ebino Plateau

Ebino Plateau (えびの高原 ebinokōgen) is a basin within the Mount Kirishima mountain ranges, situated in southern Kyushu, Japan. It is surrounded by the Mount Shiratori (白鳥山 shiratoriayama), Mount Karakuni (韓国岳 karakunidake), Mount Ebino (蝦野岳 ebinodake) and Mount Koshiki (甑岳 koshikidake) mountain peaks.

== Environment ==
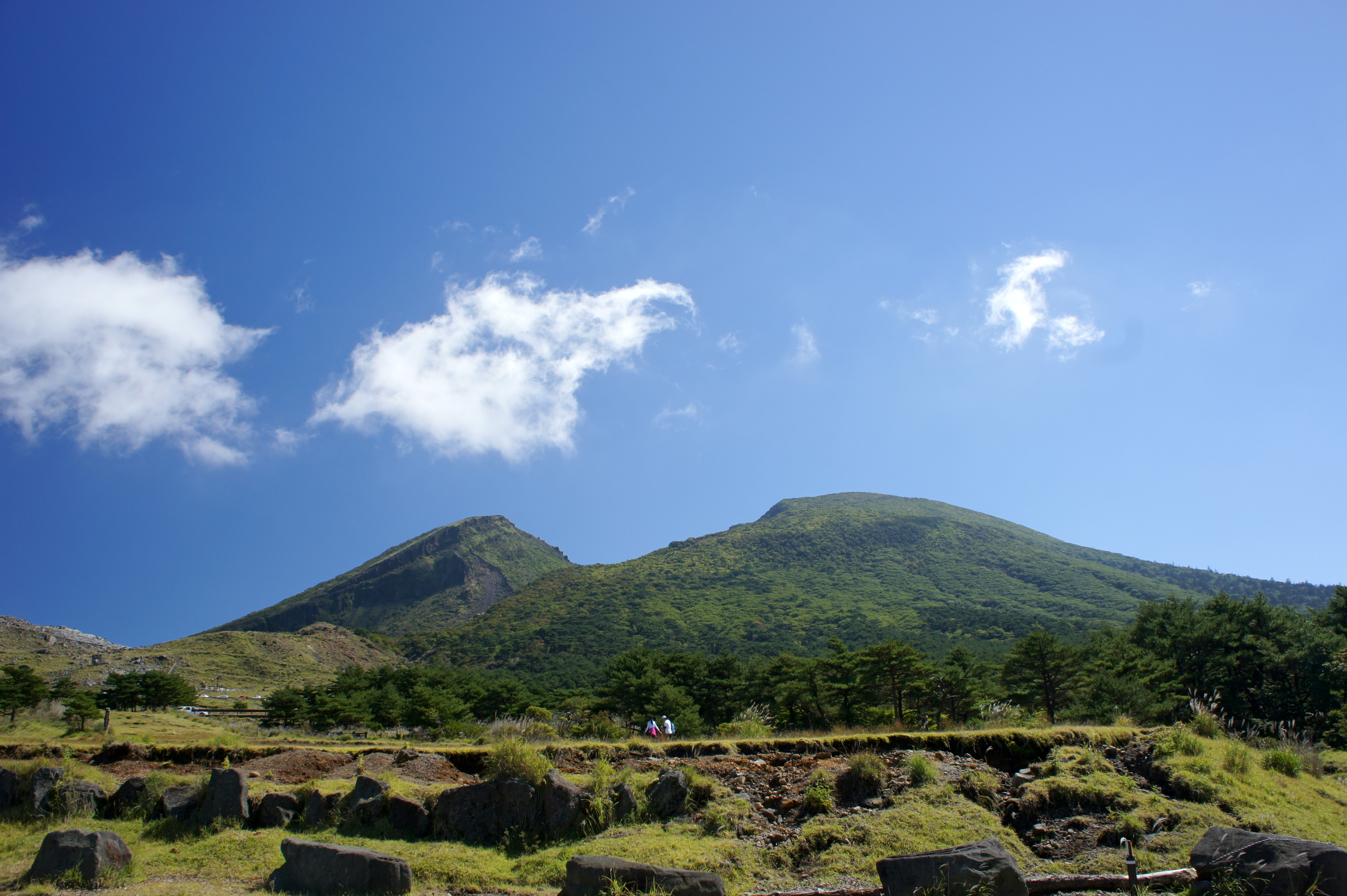
Ebino Plateau, framed by Mount Karakuni.

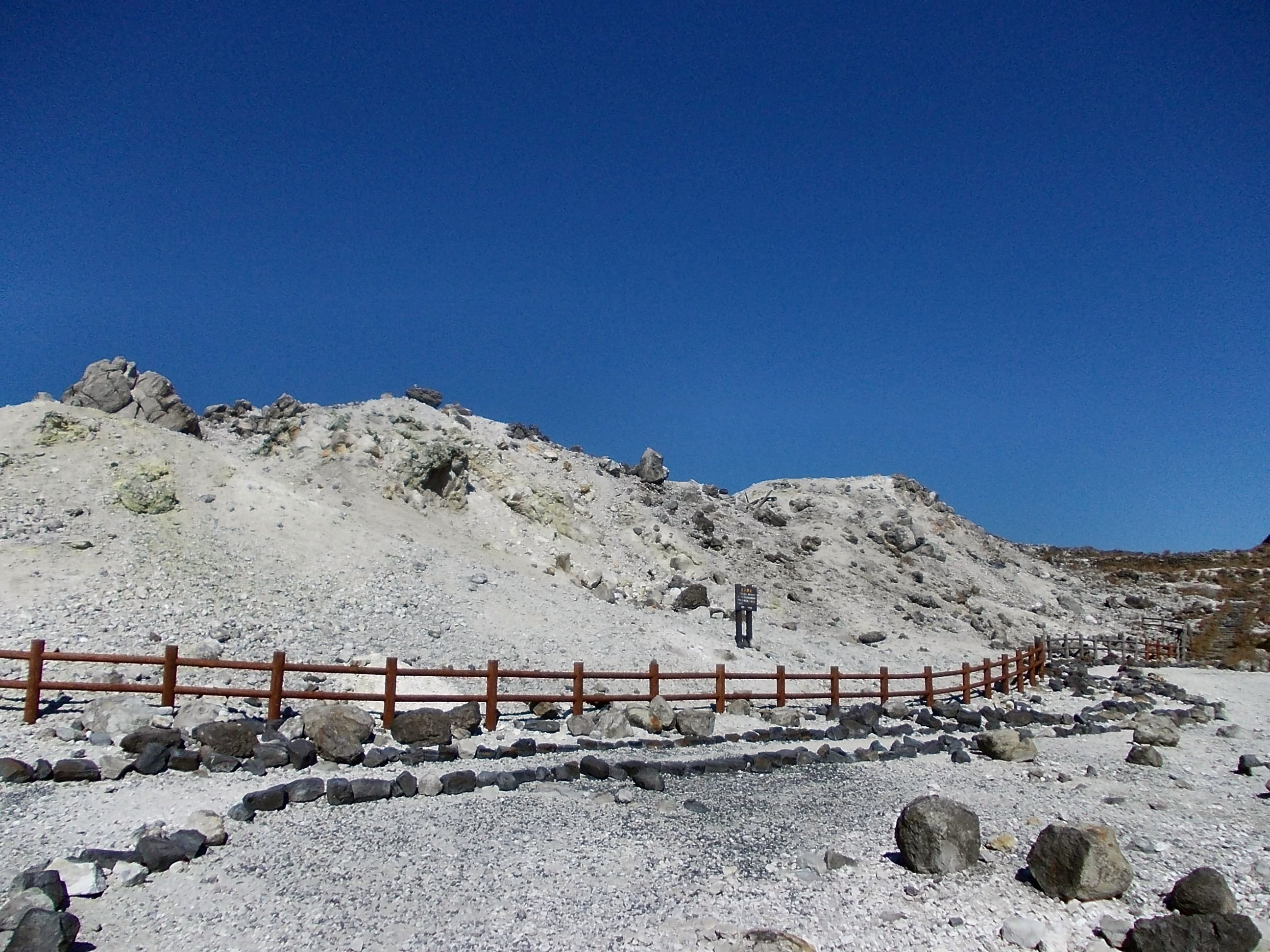
Mount Iō (硫黄山 iōzan, lit. “Sulphur Mountain”)

A field of susuki grass (Miscanthus sinensis) is located on the volcanic alluvial fan of the north-western slope of Mount Karakuni, and blooms red in autumn. The occurrence of the characteristic red hue is the result of a number of factors. Sulfur dioxide emitted from nearby Mount Iō (硫黄山 iōzan) is oxidized to form diluted sulfuric acid, which is absorbed through the soil into the plant and used as anthocyanins. Other factors include the plateau's high level of rainfall, the temperature decrease in autumn, and strong ultraviolet rays.

Forestry in the surrounding hills consists of Japanese red pine trees (Pinus densiflora). The area is known for its beauty, and has been selected as one of Japan's "100 Forest Therapy" forests (森林浴の森100選). A protected species of crab apple known as nokaidou (ノカイドウ, (Malus spontanea) is exclusively native the Ebino Plateau region. Other alpine vegetation found in the region includes clusters of Kyushu azalea (Rhododendron kiusianum), dwarf abelia (Abelia serrata), false lily-of-the-valley (Maianthemum dilatatum), and the perennial plant species Achizocodon soldanelloides.

Local fauna include wild boar (Sus scrofa) and the Kyushu sika deer (Cervus nippon nippon). The autumn mating call of the male deer was selected as one of the "100 Soundscapes of Japan" (日本の音風景100選).

== History ==
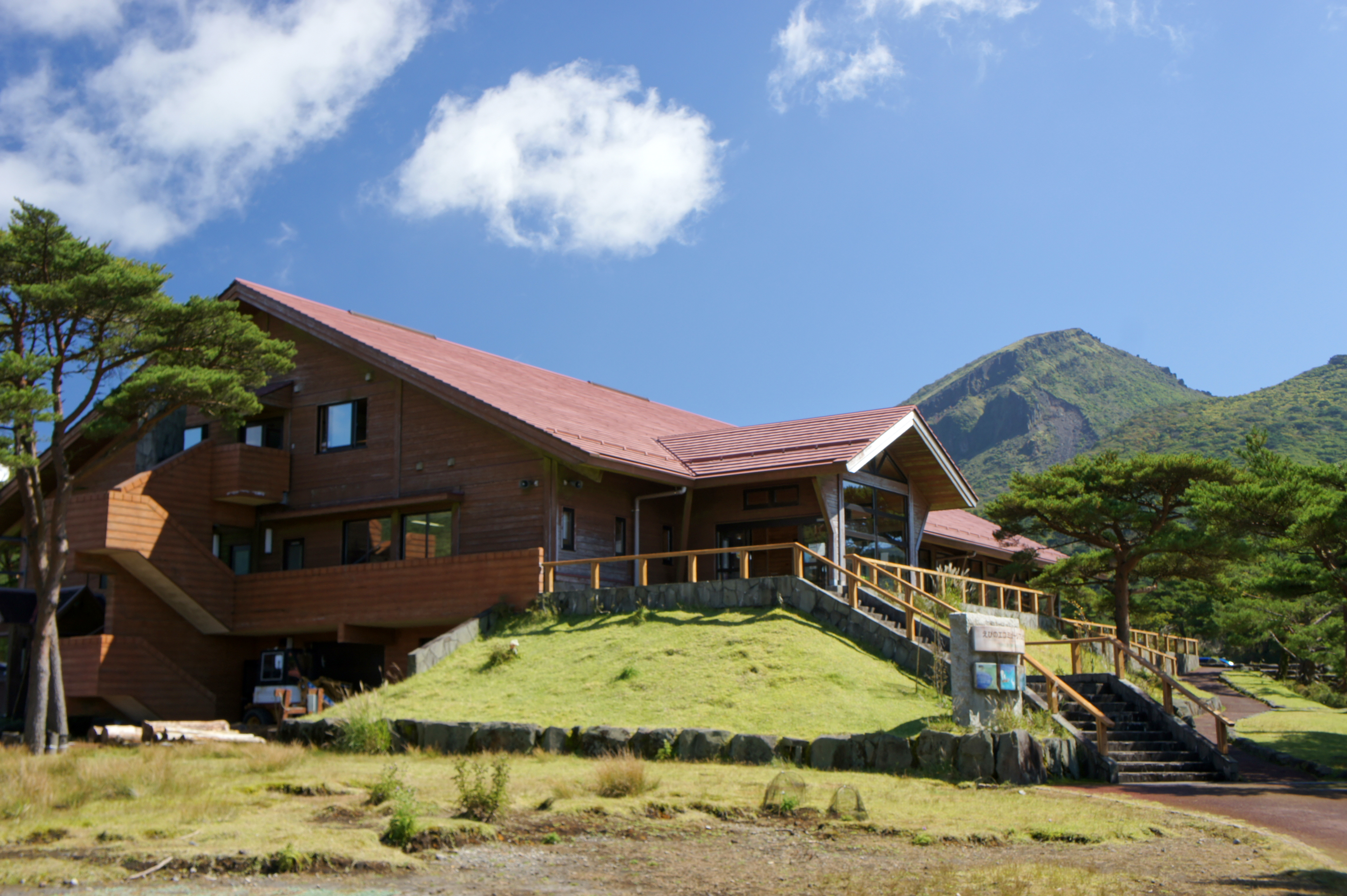
Ebino Eco-Museum Center

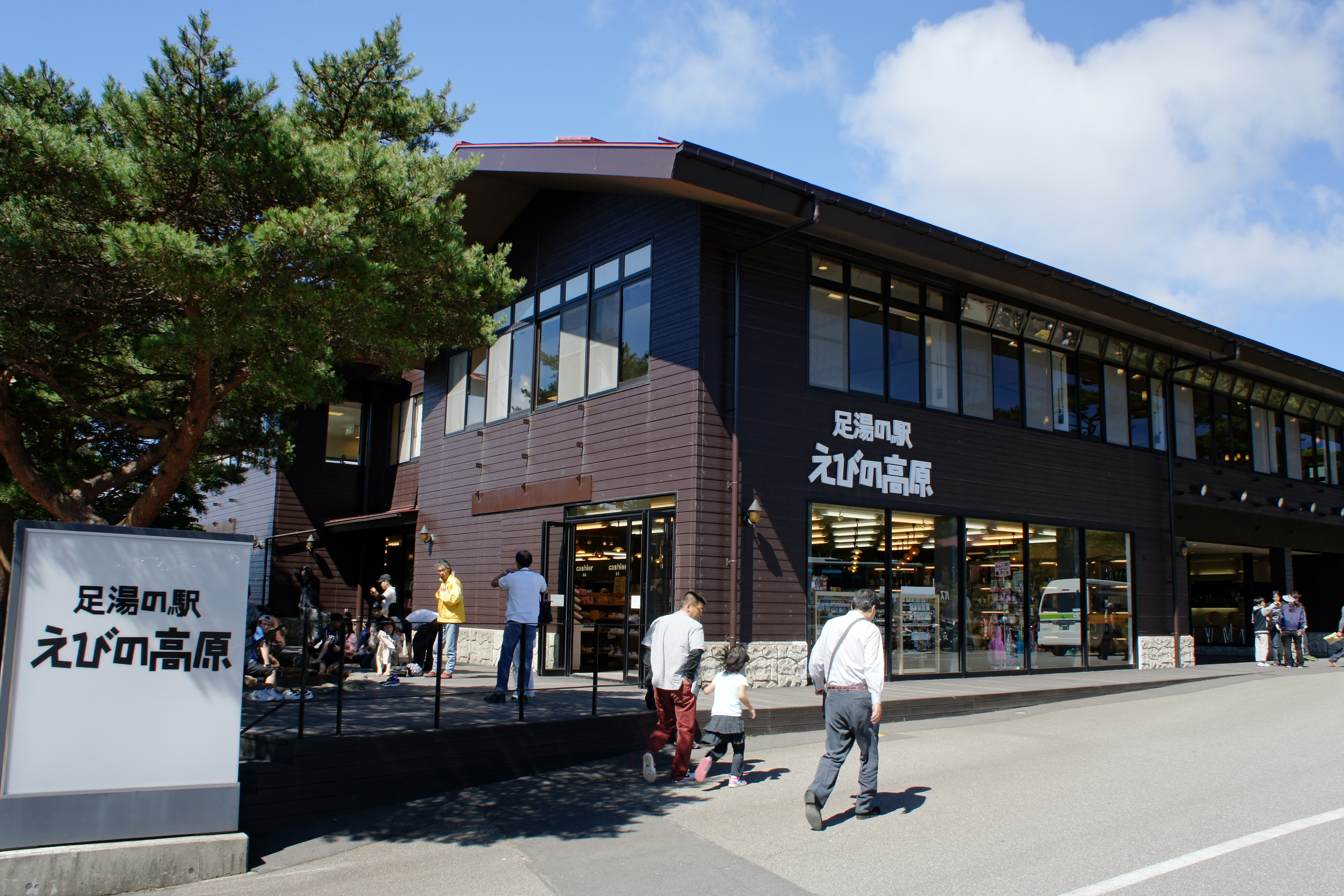
A foot bath, restaurant and gift shop, situated at a popular start and end point for hikers.

According to a common theory, Ebino Plateau was named for the susuki grass fields that bloom red in autumn. The color can be likened to that of shrimp, which are called “ebi” (蝦) in Japanese. However, whether this is true or not is unknown, and an alternate theory suggests that the etymology of the name comes from the area being at the foot of the volcanic Mount Karakuni, which overlooks Kagoshima Bay. If this version were to be taken as true, the name would still have been be read as “ebino” (江火野), but originally written with characters meaning “bay” (江), “fire” (火) (taken from the word “volcano” (火山)), and “field” (野).

During the mid-10th century, the Buddhist monk Shoku (性空 shōkū) went to Ebino Plateau to train. The Shimazu clan (島津氏) were also known to frequently visit the area. Sulfur mining has been carried out in the vicinity of Mount Io since the Edo period.

Since the 1950s, Miyazaki Prefecture (宮崎県 miyazaki ken) has worked to develop Ebino Plateau as one of its key tourist destinations. Though originally there were only cabins designed to accommodate sulfur miners, in 1951 many Russian-style mountain huts were built around Fudo Lake (不動池 fudō ike) and began to attract hikers. Prefectural lodgings and a prefectural road leading from the town of Iinomachi (飯野町 īnomachi) were both opened in 1953.

Access was improved in 1958, when the North Kirishima Toll Road (県道1号) was opened. Additionally, prominent Japanese businessman Shotaro Iwakiri (岩切章太郎 iwakiri shōtarō) commissioned the construction of the Ebino Plateau Hotel (えびの高原ホテル). Known as the Kirishima Plateau Hotel (霧島高原ホテル) at the time, it was developed as a health resort. Initially, there was little public awareness of these tourism developments. This began to change when the western regional director of the now-defunct Japanese National Railways (日本国有鉄道 nihon kokuyū tetsudō) visited the area, and affectionately nicknamed the local express train "Ebino". Following this, the awareness and popularity of Ebino Plateau began to increase nationwide.
