= Kirishima-Kinkowan National Park =

National park in Kyūshū, Japan

- 霧島錦江湾国立公園
- IUCN category II (national park)
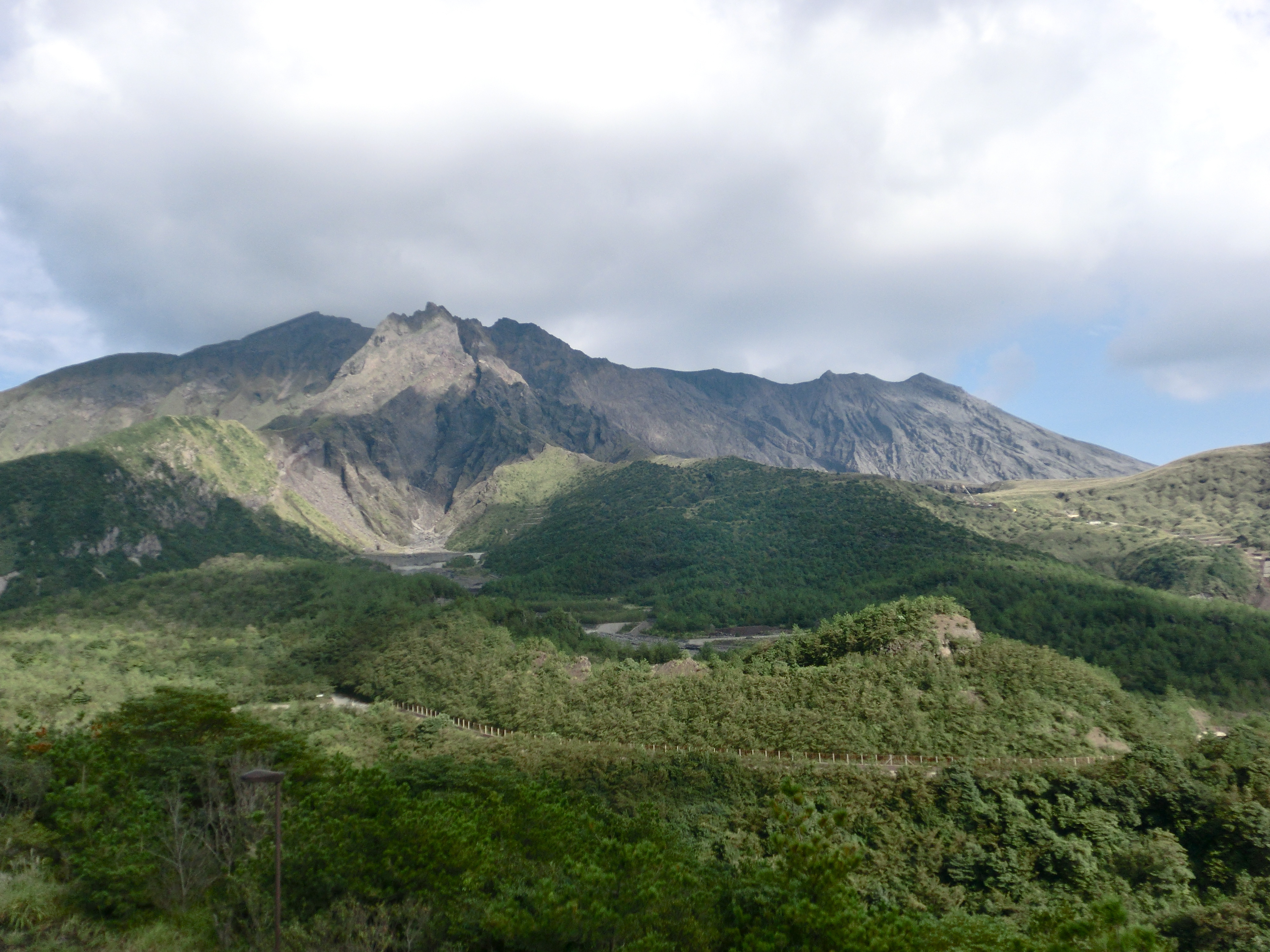
- Summit of Sakurajima from Yunoyori Observatory

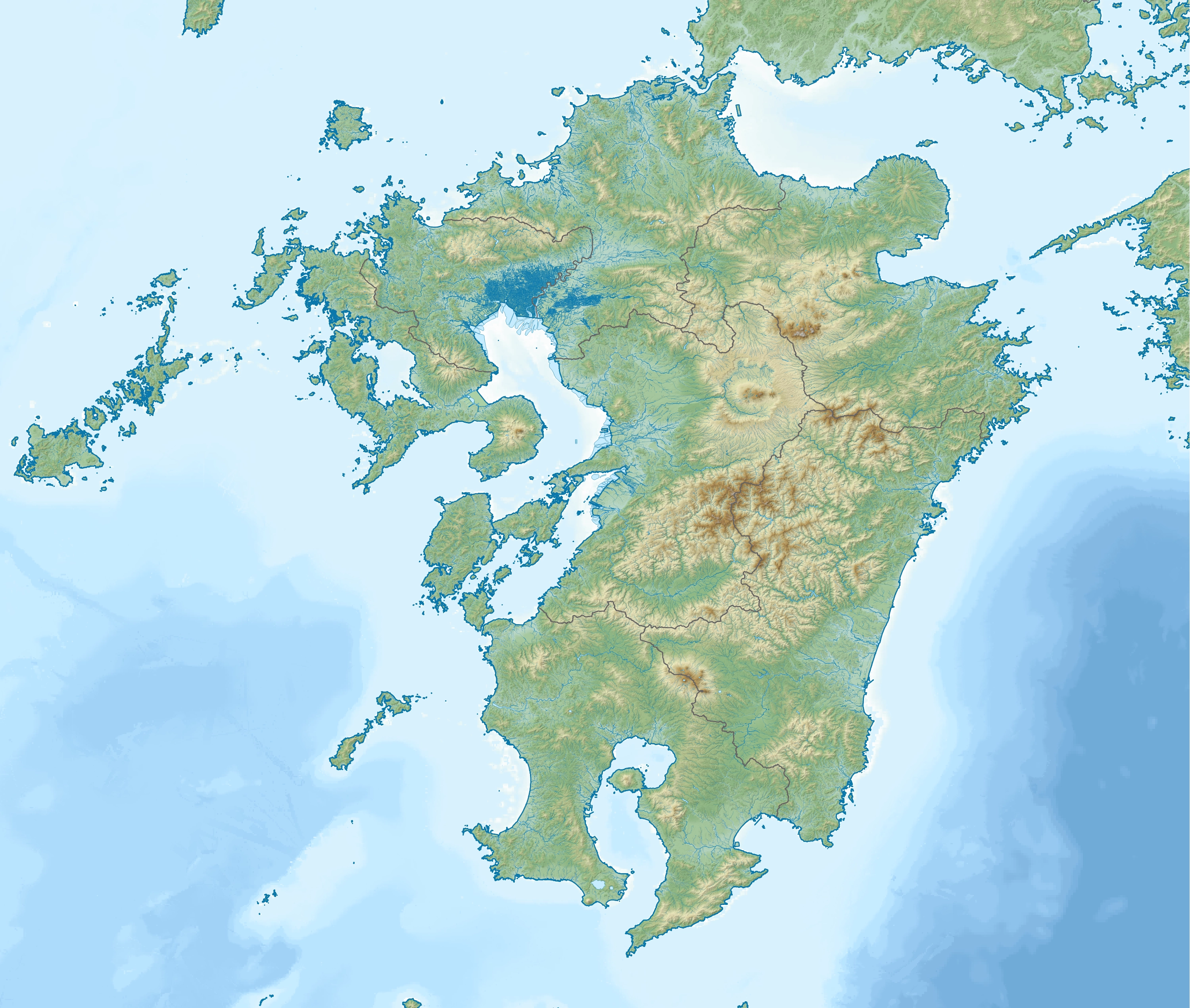
- Location within Kyushu Location within Japan
- Location: Miyazaki, Kagoshima, Kyūshū, Japan
- Coordinates: 31°21′31″N 130°31′43″E
- Area: 365.86 km^{2} (141.26 sq mi)
- Established: March 16, 1934
- Governing body: Ministry of the Environment (Japan)

Kirishima-Kinkowan National Park (霧島錦江湾国立公園, Kirishima-Kinkōwan Kokuritsu Kōen) is a national park in Kyūshū, Japan. It is composed of Kirishima-Kagoshima Bay, an area of Kagoshima Prefecture and Miyazaki Prefecture known for its active volcanoes, volcanic lakes, and onsen. The total area is 365.86 square kilometres (141.26 sq mi).

== History ==
On March 16, 1934, it was first established as Kirishima-Yaku National Park. On March 16, 2012 Yakushima was split off as the separate Yakushima National Park 325.53 square kilometres (125.69 sq mi) and Kirishima-Yaku National Park was renamed to Kirishima-Kinkowan National Park.

The area became famous as Japan's first honeymoon spot, because Ryoma Sakamoto took his wife Oryo there.

Kirishima was used as a filming location for the 1967 James Bond movie You Only Live Twice.

== Kirishima ==
- Mount Kirishima
- Ebino-kōgen
- Takachiho-kawara
- Lake Miike
- Mount Kurino
- Mount Karakuni
- Mount Takachiho
- Cape Sata
- Sakura-jima
- Mount Kaimon
- Lake Ikeda

== Major scenic spots ==
=== Kirishima area ===
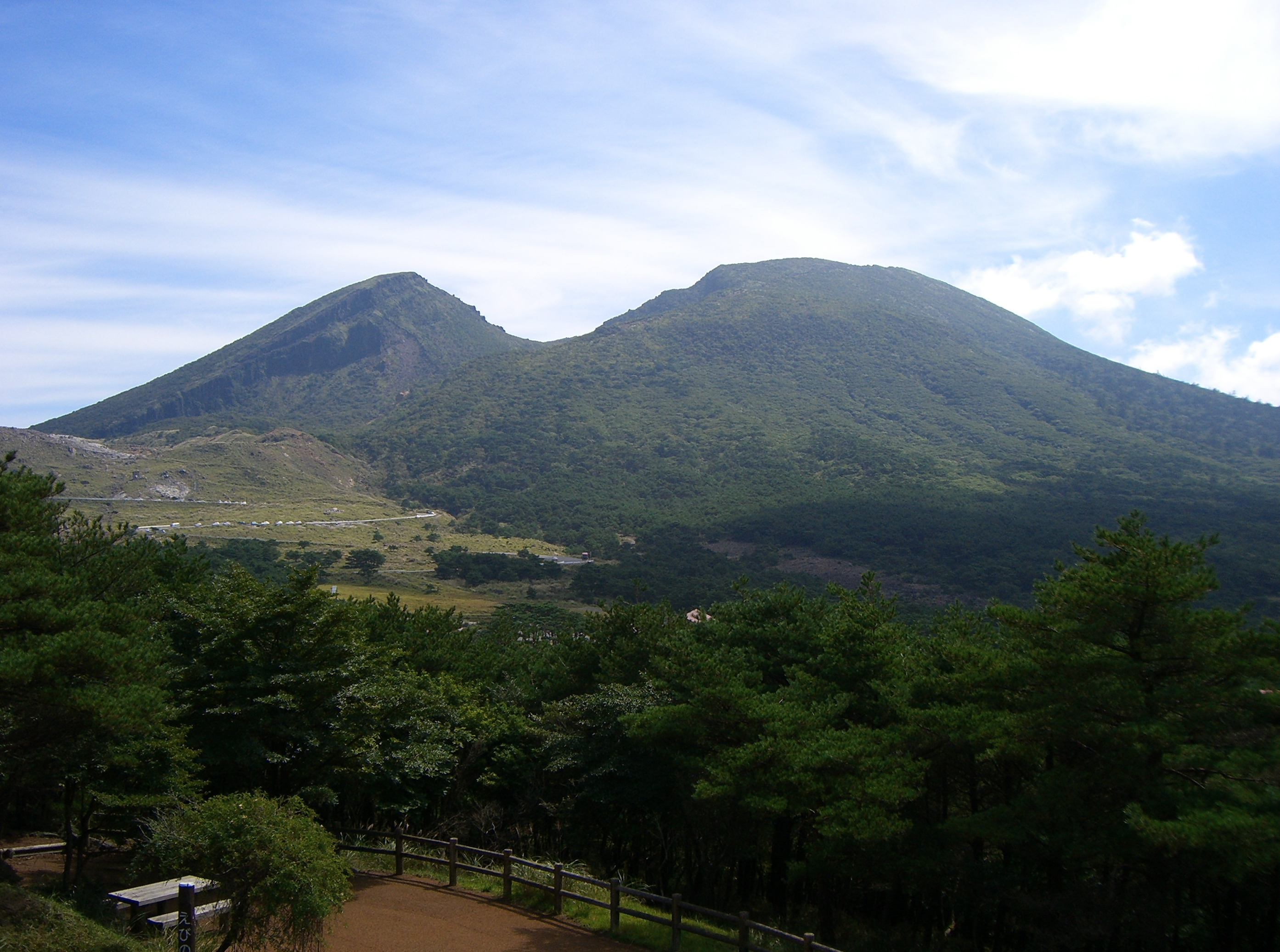
Mount Karakuni

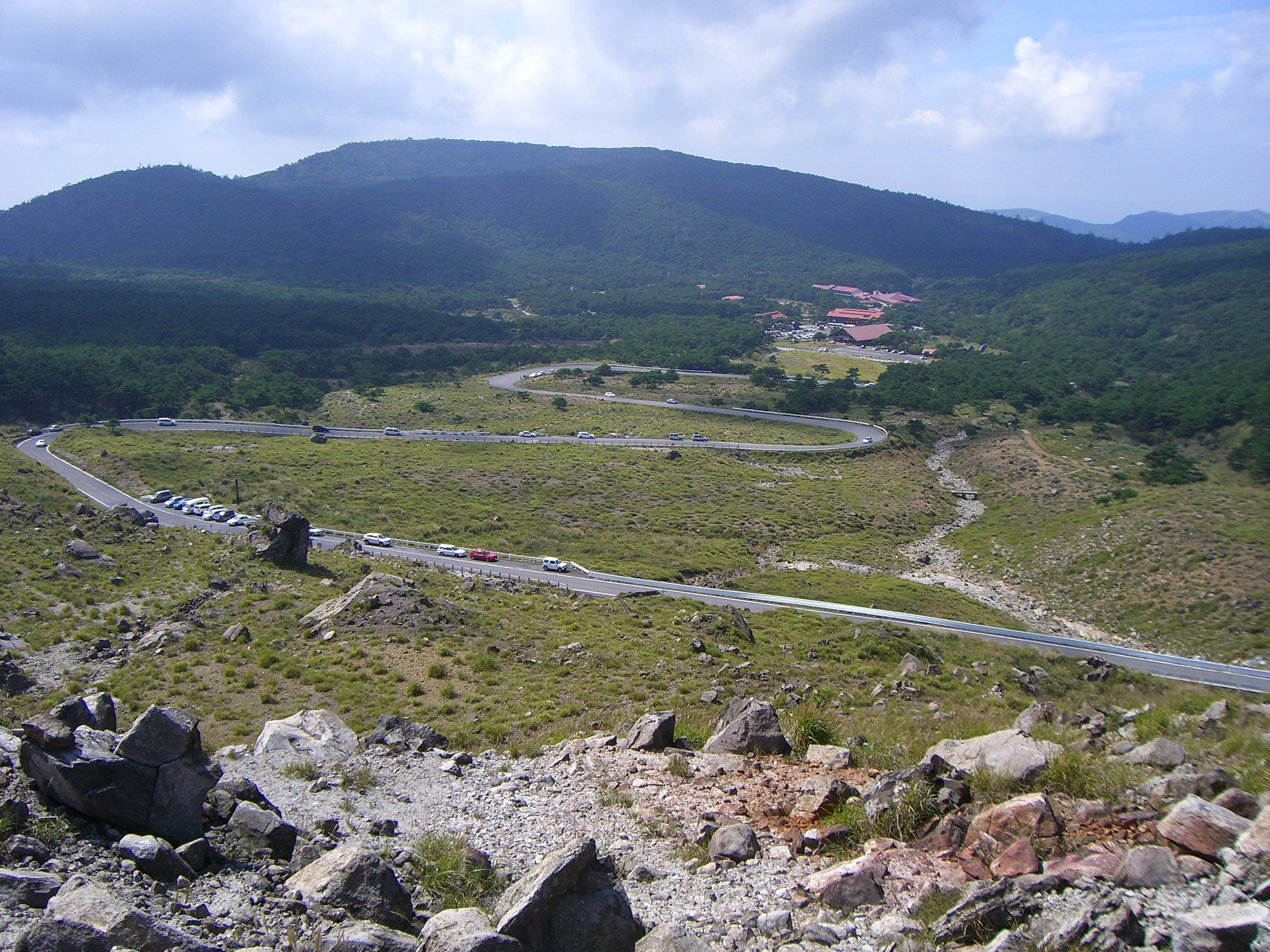
Ebino Plateau

=== Kagoshima Bay area ===
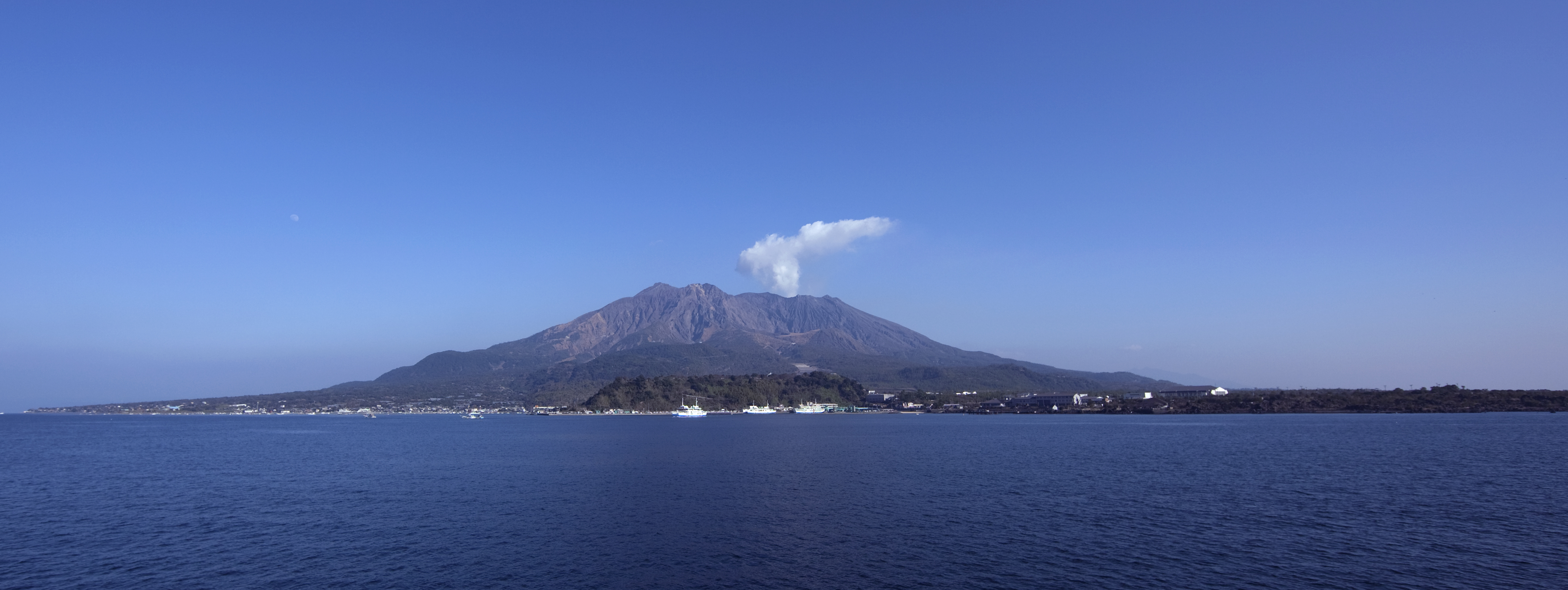
Sakurajima

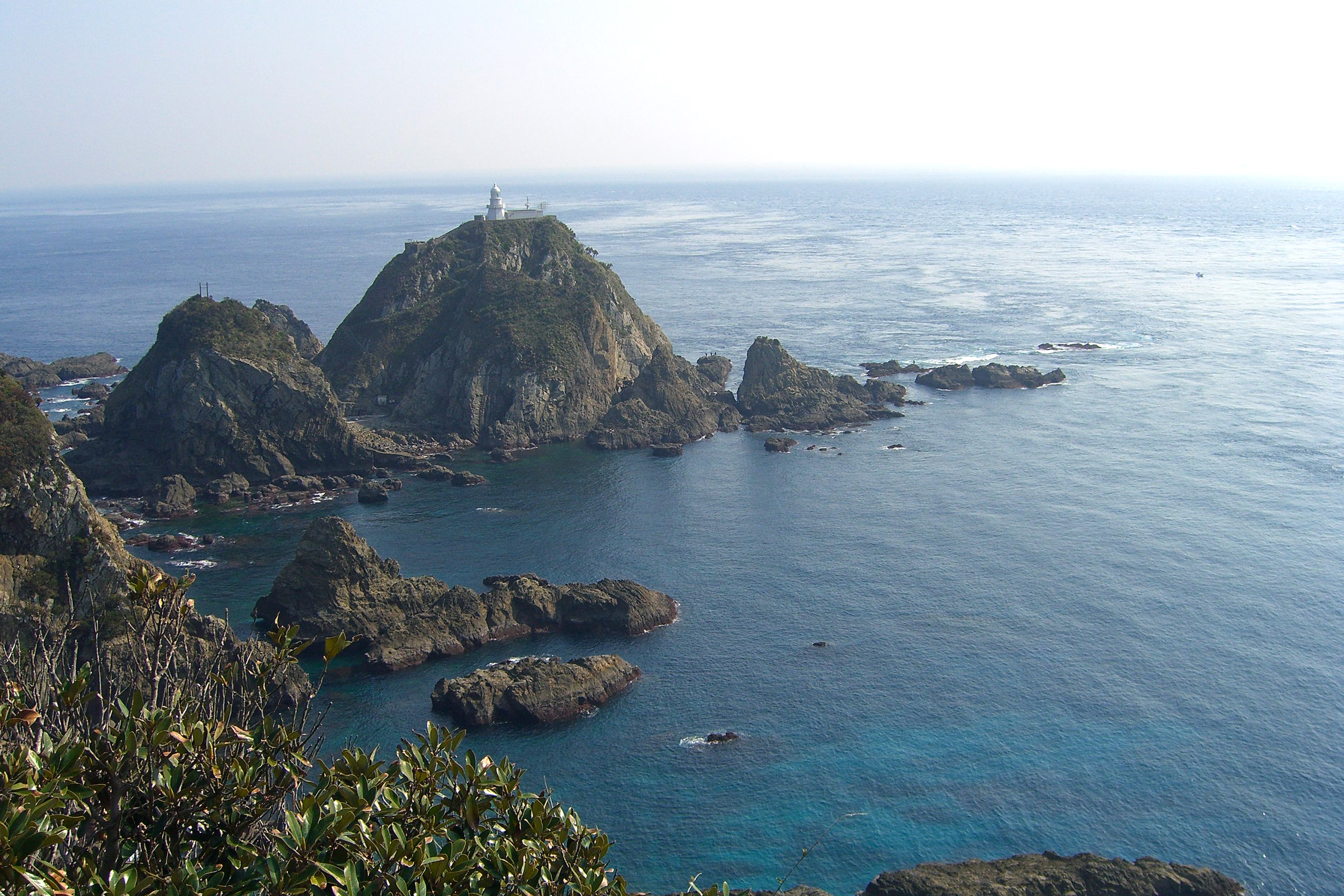
Cape Sata

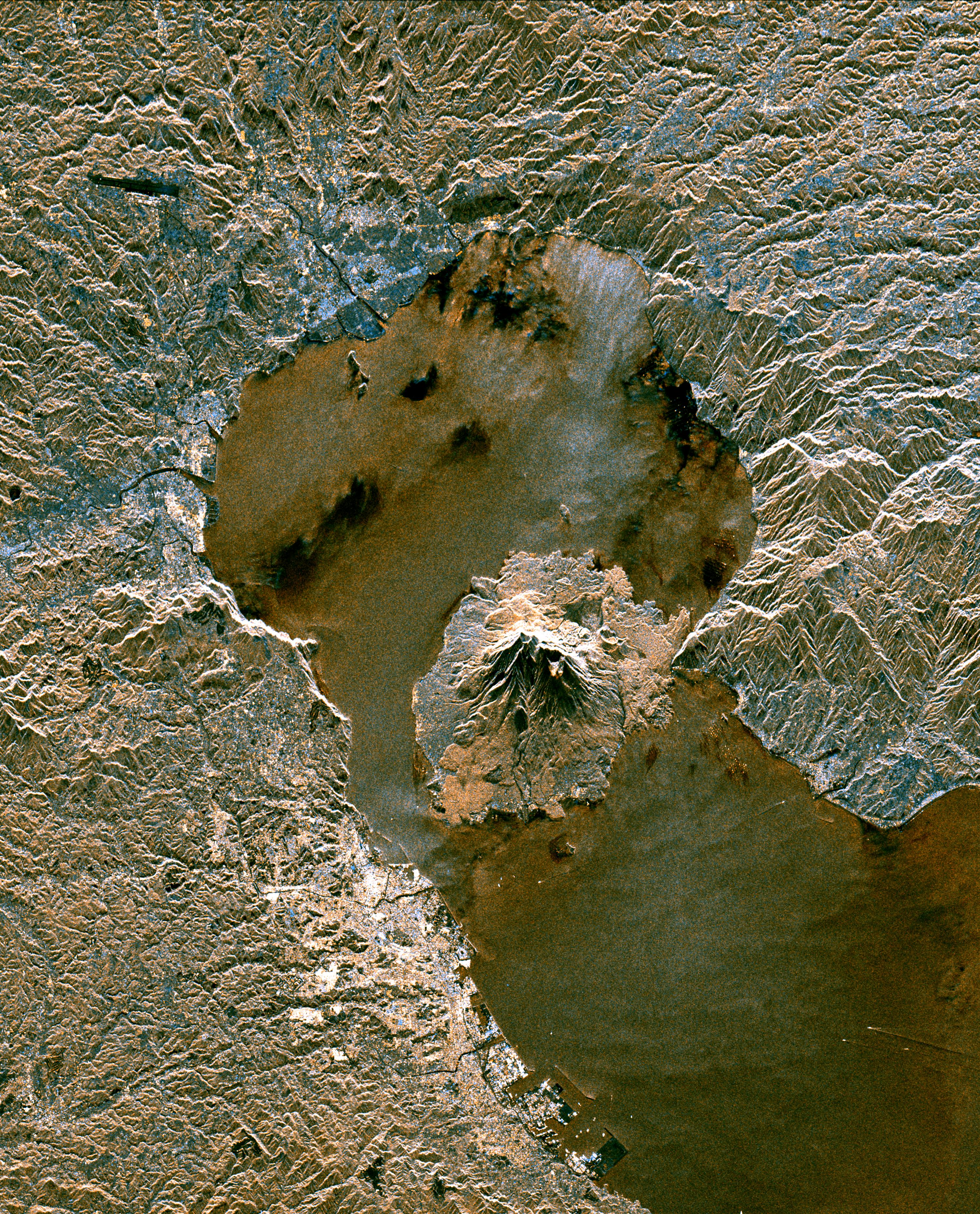
Aira Caldera spreading in the north of Kagoshima

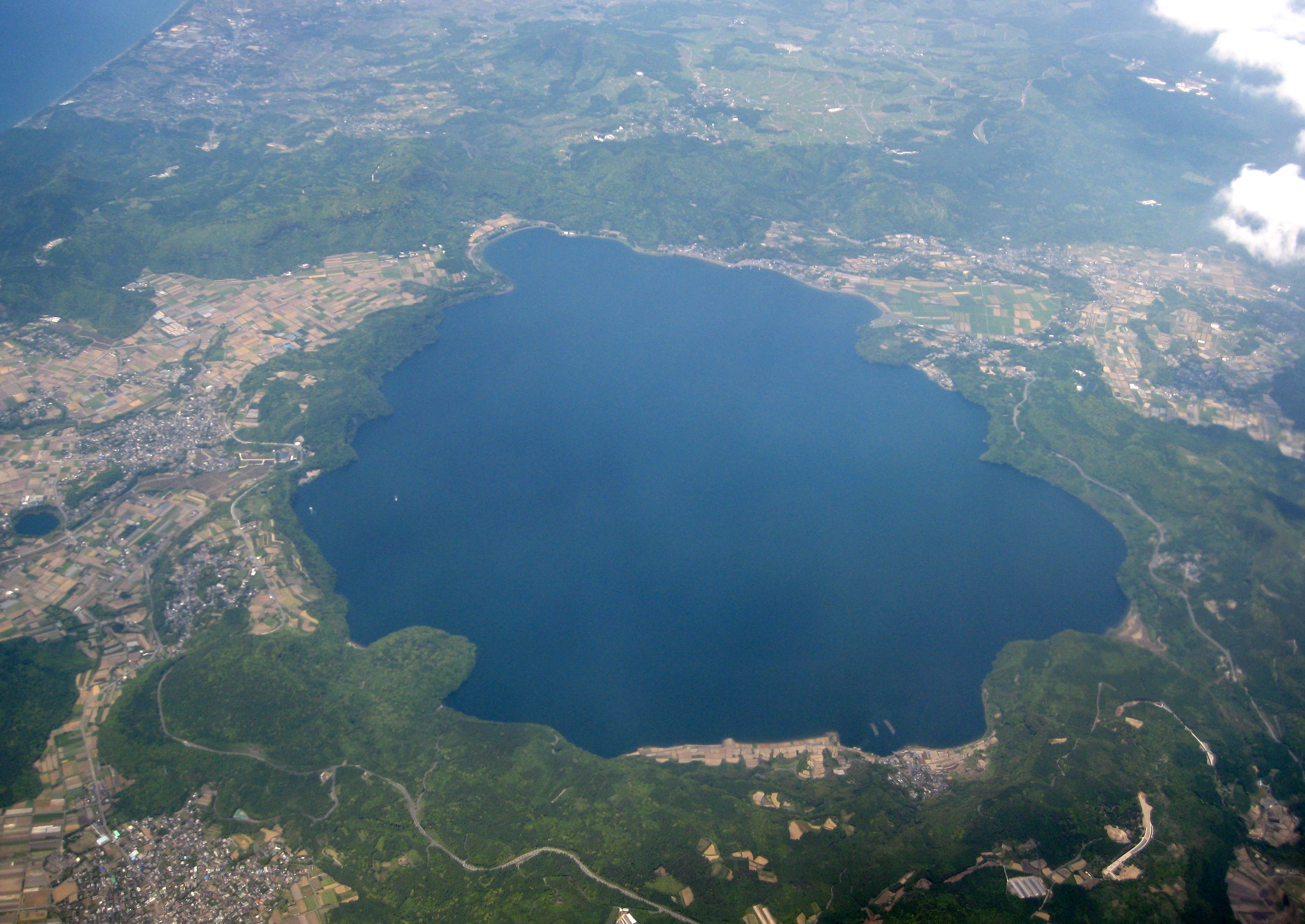
Lake Ikeda

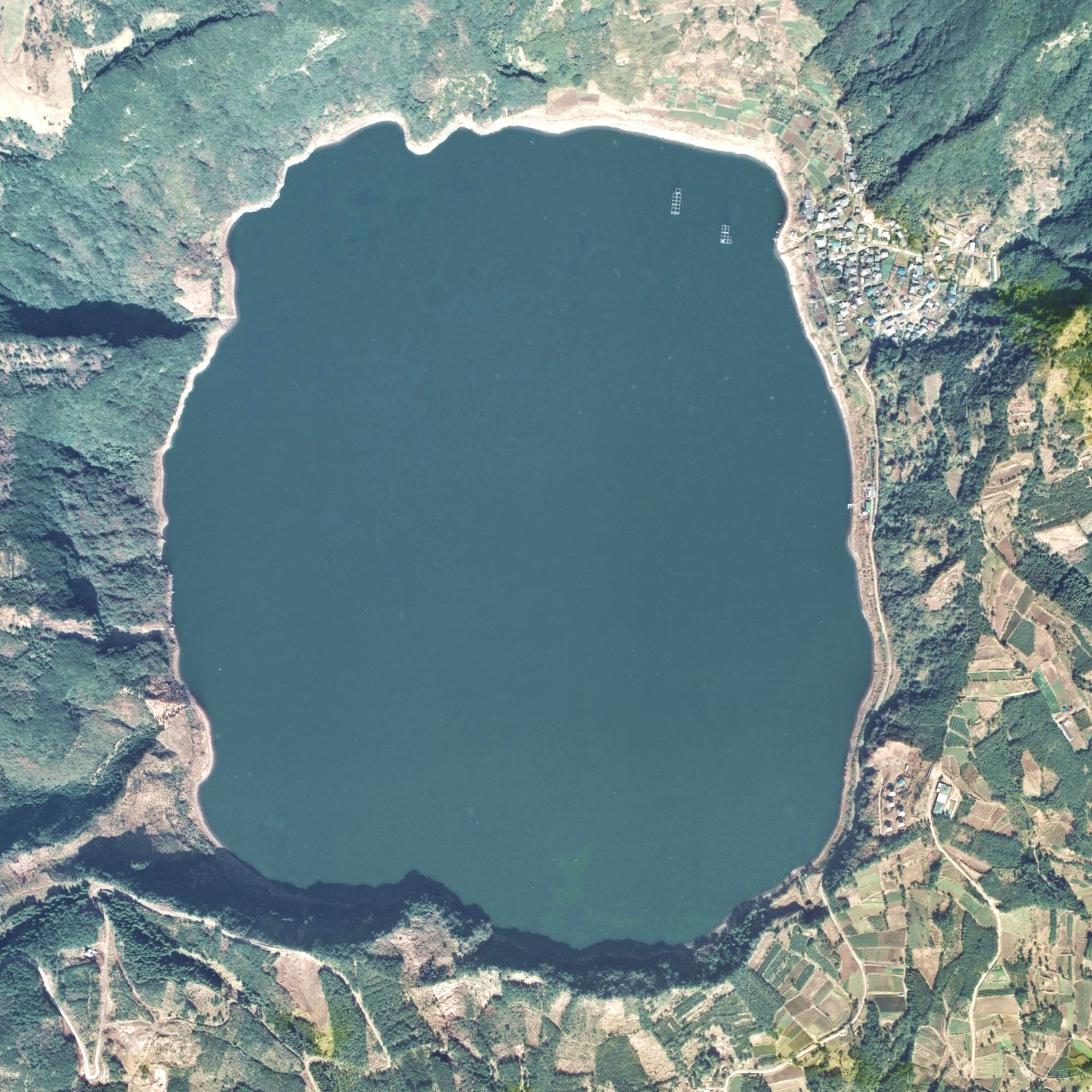
Aerial photo of Unagiike (1974)

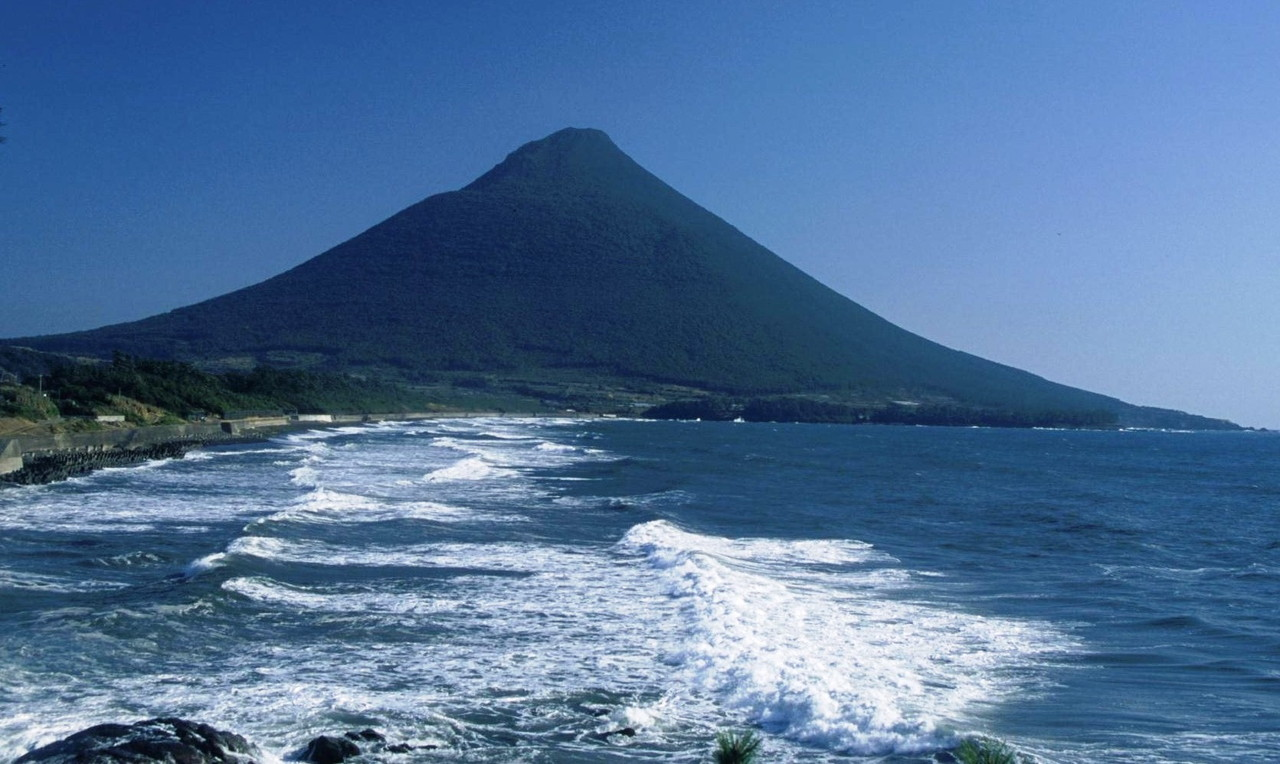
Kaimondake volcano

== Related municipalities ==
- Miyakonojō
- Kobayashi
- Ebino
- Takaharu
- Kagoshima, Kagoshima
- Ibusuki
- Tarumizu
- Kirishima
- Yūsui
- Minamiōsumi

== See also ==
- List of national parks of Japan
