= Shinmoedake =

Volcano on the island of Kyushu, Japan

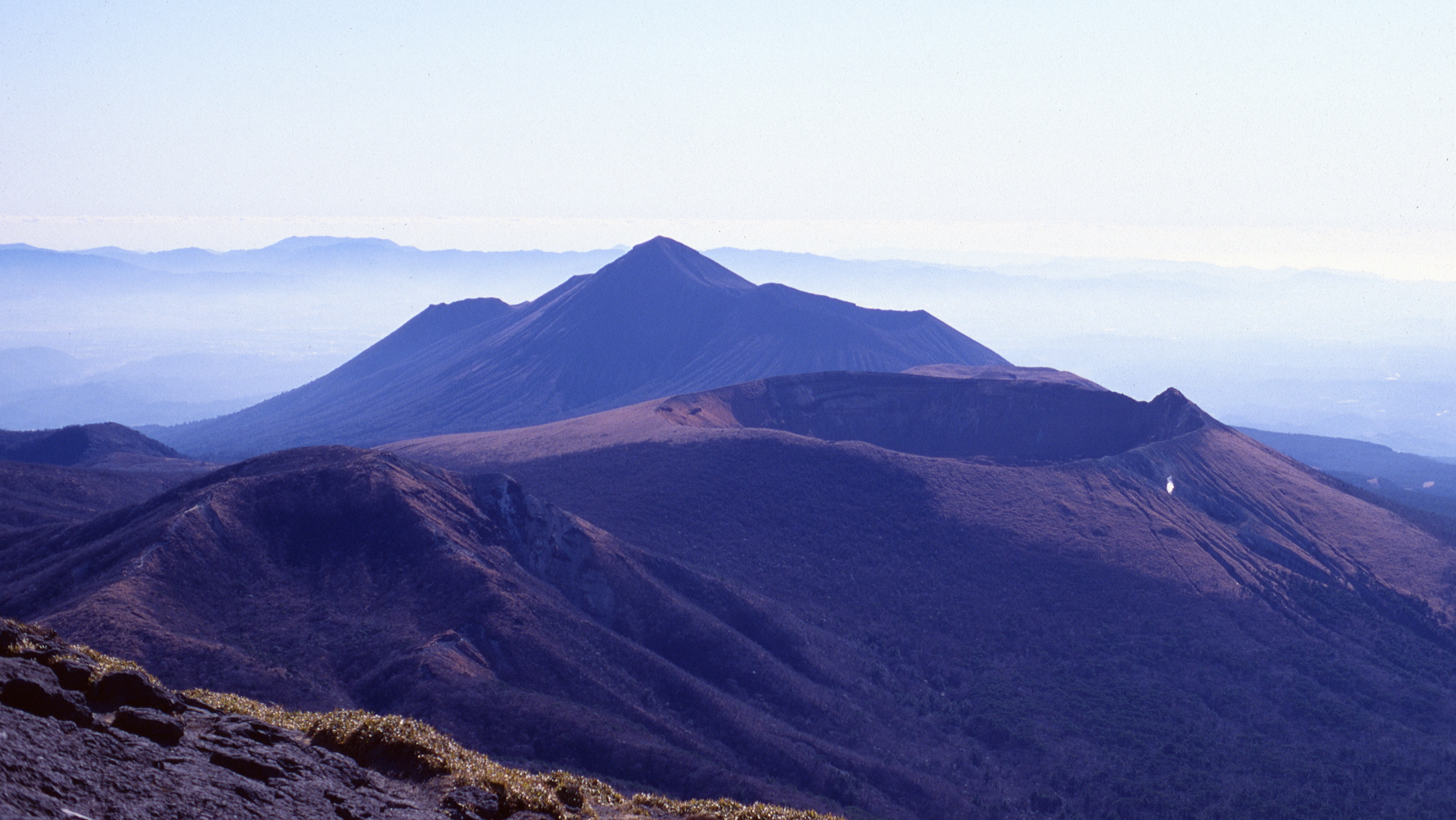
- View of Shinmoedake in December 1998

Highest point
- Elevation: 1,423 m (4,669 ft)
- Coordinates: 31°54′42″N 130°52′59″E

Geography

Geology
- Rock age: Pleistocene (25 ka)
- Mountain type: Stratovolcano
- Last eruption: June 22 to September 7, 2025

Shinmoedake (Japanese: 新燃岳) is a volcano in Kagoshima Prefecture, Kyūshū, Japan, and a part of the Mount Kirishima cluster of volcanoes. It is believed to have formed between 7,300 and 25,000 years ago.

Eruptions from Shinmoedake have been recorded in 1716, 1717, 1771, 1822, 1959, 1991, 2008, 2009, 2011, 2017, 2018 and 2025.

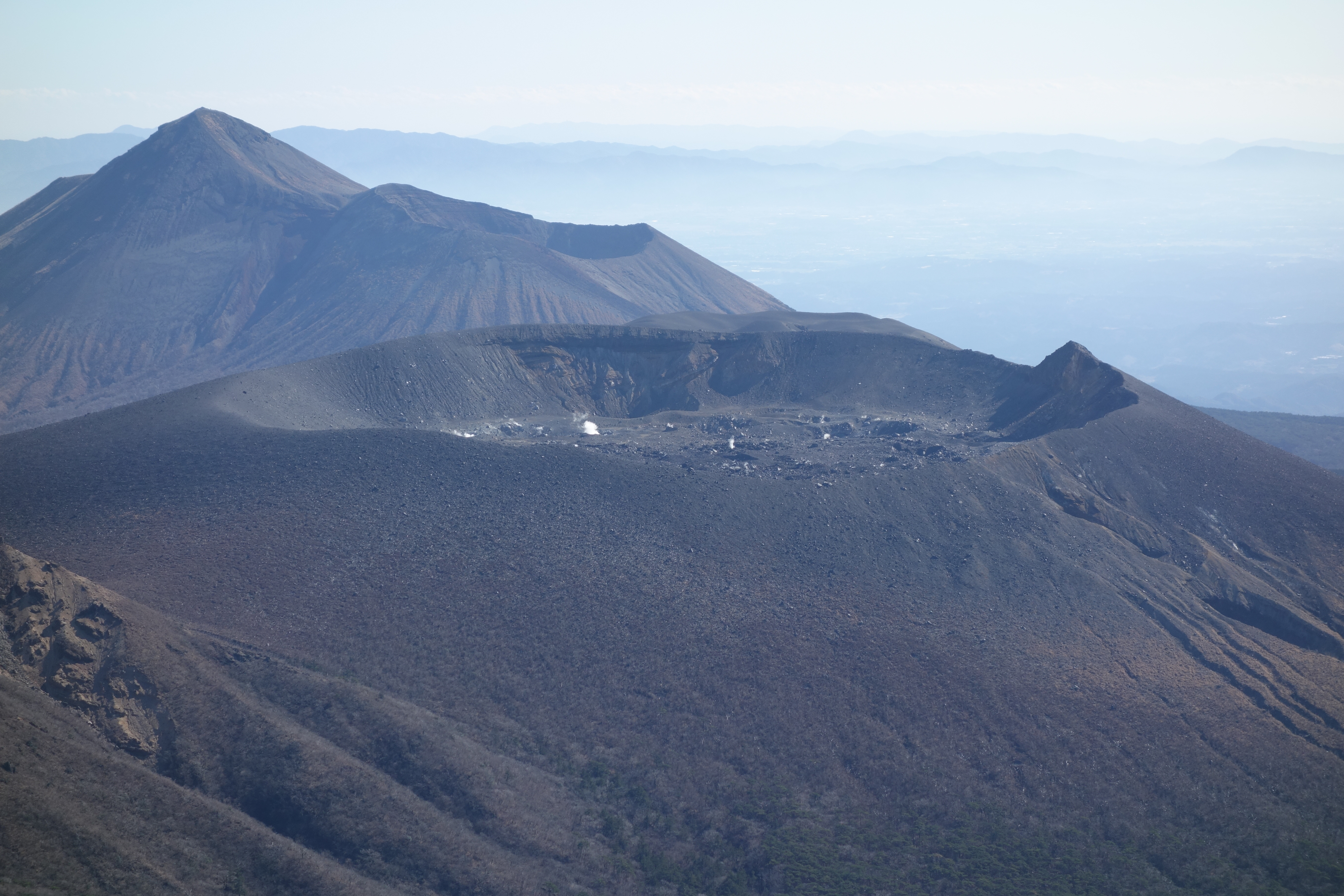
Crater viewed from Mount Karakuni

== 2011 eruptions ==
The 2011 eruptions began on 19 January. On 26 January, at 7:30 AM, increased eruption activity spewed ash over the surrounding area. The ash closed four railroad lines, and some airline service was cancelled due to heavy ash in the air. It was the largest eruption from Shinmoedake since 1959. On 27 January, the volcano alert level was raised to 3.

On 1 February, an even larger eruption sent a column of smoke up to 2.5 km (1.6 mi) into the air and threw volcanic bombs up to 1.5 km (4,900 ft) away from the vent.

During February 2011, a lava dome formed in Shinmoedake's crater. On February 17, an evacuation advisory was put in place for the Miyakonojo area for 2,500 people after heavy rains threatened to produce lahars, and at least 63 people evacuated.

On 13 March, two days after the 2011 Tōhoku earthquake, the volcano once again erupted. The eruption forced the evacuation of several hundred residents.

== 2018 eruptions ==
On 6 March 2018, a large eruption began launching rocks and ash to a height of 4.5 km (2.8 mi). On 22 June 2018, another eruption occurred, four days after a 6.1 Mw earthquake struck Osaka on 18 June, sending smoke and rocks thousands of meters into the air.

== Cultural references ==
Shinmoedake was used as a location in 1967 James Bond film, You Only Live Twice, as the volcano in which the villains' secret rocket base is located.
