= Kirishima Shrine =

Shinto shrine in Kagoshima Prefecture, Japan

Kirishima-Jingū 霧島神宮
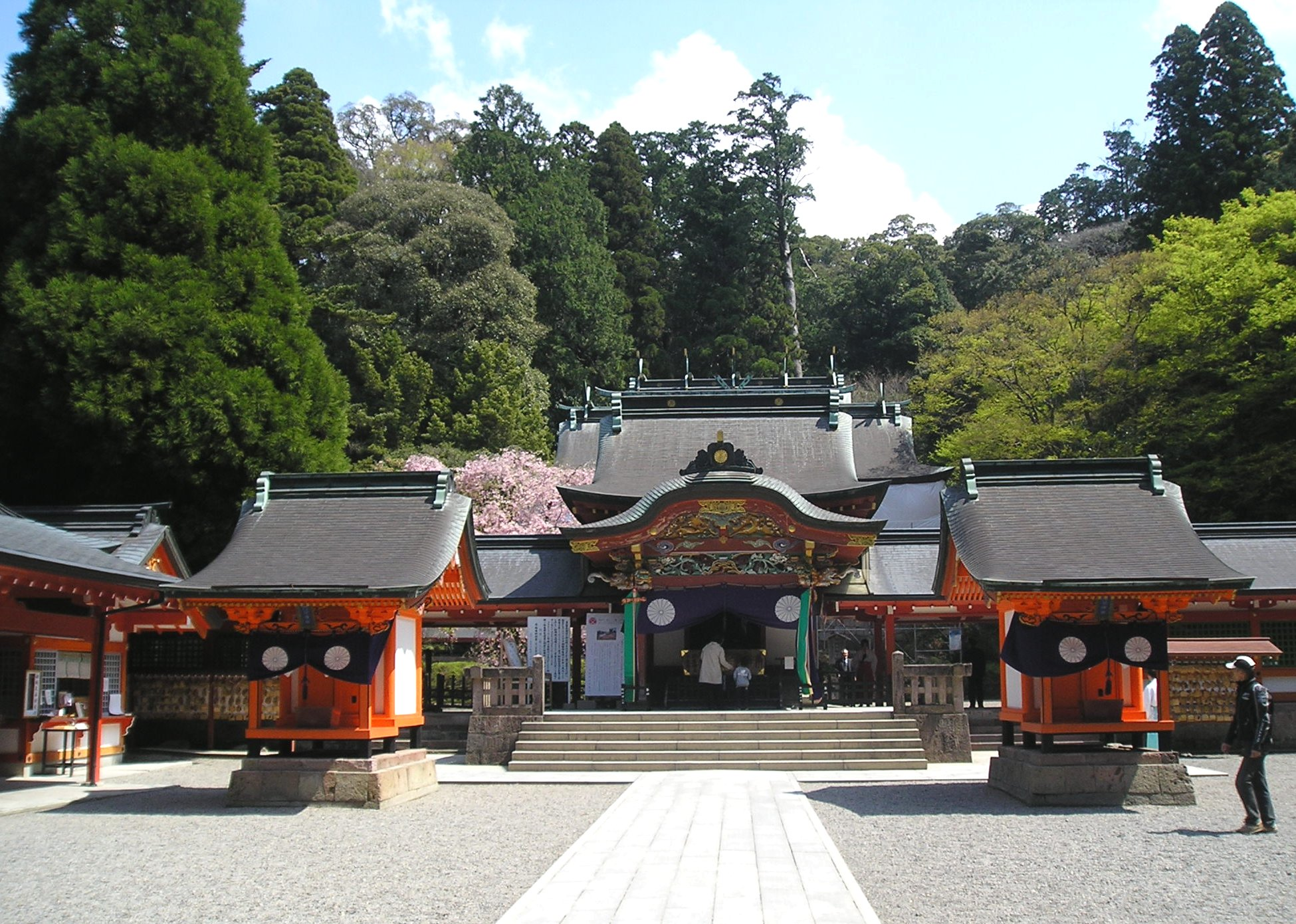
- The honden

- Location within Japan

Religion
- Affiliation: Shinto
- Deity: Konohanasakuya-hime; Hoori; Toyotama-hime; Ugayafukiaezu; Tamayori-bime; Ninigi-no-Mikoto

Location
- Location: 2608-5, Kirishima-Taguchi, Kirishima, Kagoshima Prefecture 899-4201
- Interactive map of Kirishima-Jingū 霧島神宮
- Coordinates: 31°51′32.2″N 130°52′18.7″E

Website
- www.kirishimajingu.or.jp/index.htm

Kirishima-Jingū (霧島神宮) is a Shinto shrine located in Kirishima, Kagoshima Prefecture, Japan.

Takachiho-gawara the location of the descent from heaven is present on the shrine grounds.

Historically, the entire of Mount Kirishima is considered part of the shrine grounds. Today, parts of the mountains where festivals take place and the location of the Tenson kōrin is considered part of the shrine grounds.

It is dedicated to Konohanasakuya-hime, Hoori, Toyotama-hime, Ugayafukiaezu, Tamayori-bime, and Ninigi-no-Mikoto. This shrine holds several Important Cultural Properties, such as the honden, heiden, haiden, tōrōka (登廊下), Chōkushiden (勅使殿), etc. It has been destroyed several times by volcanic eruptions.
