= Takachiho-gawara =

Shinto shrine near Kirishima, Kagoshima Prefecture, Japan

Coordinates: 31.8854°N 130.8957°E

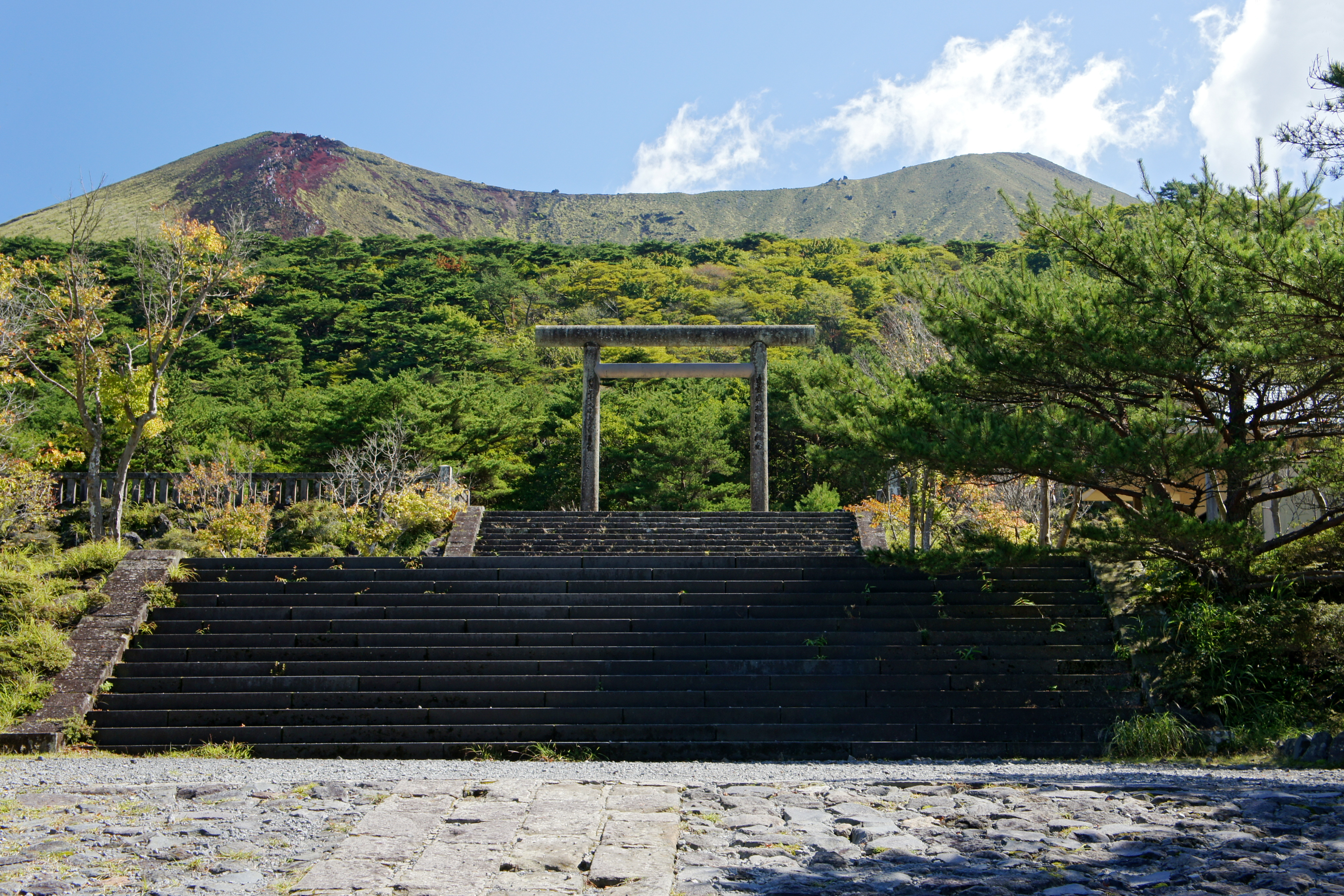
Commemorative location of the old shrine, Ohachi crater of Mt. Takachiho in the background.

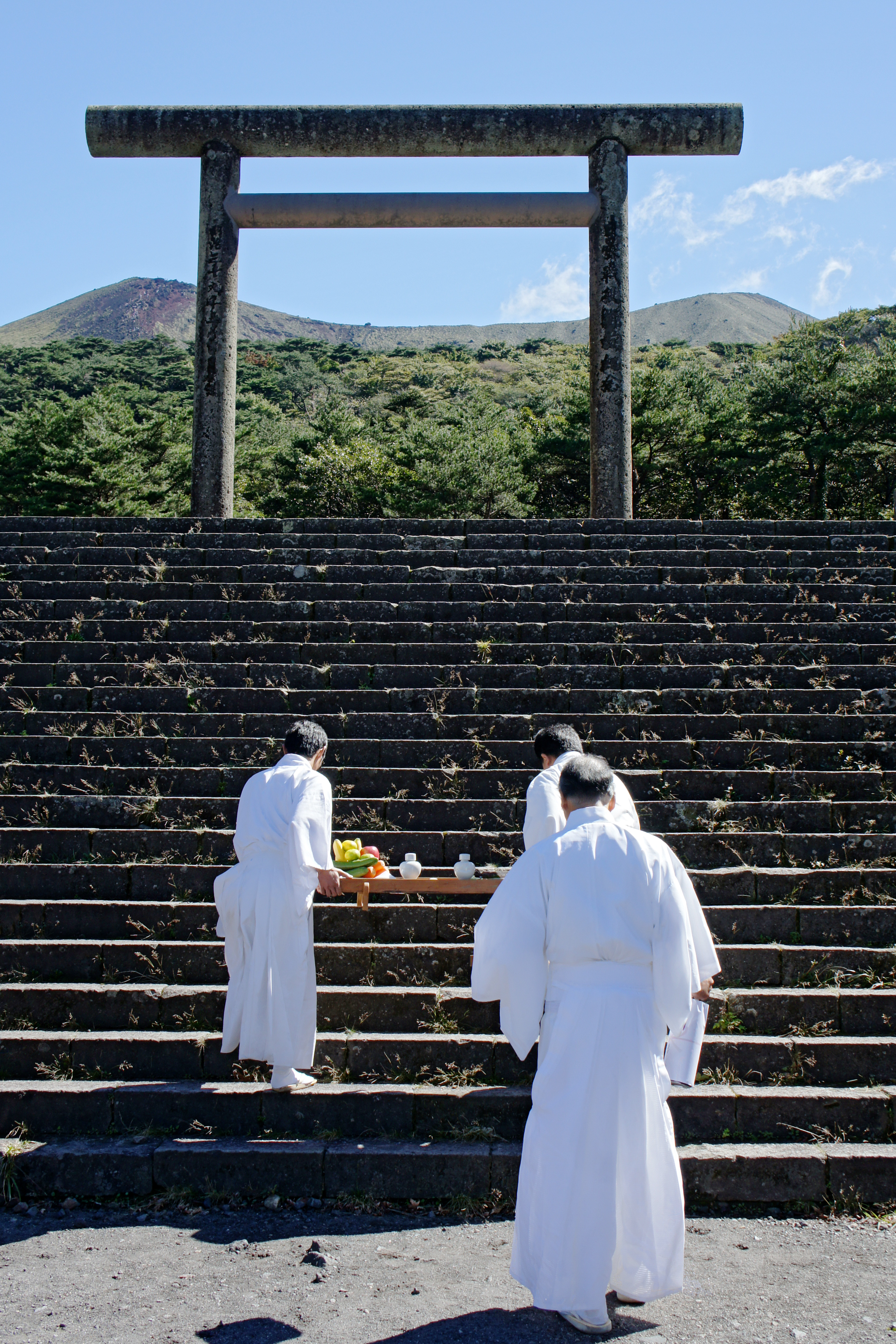
Ritual for Tenson Korin being performed at the Torii.

Takachiho-gawara (高千穂河原) is a small plain located near Kirishima, Kagoshima Prefecture, Japan. Located at the trailheads to Mt. Takachiho and Mt. Kirishima, it is now the site of the visitor center of the Kirshima-Kinkowan National Park.

== Site ==
It is part of the cultural area surrounding Kirishima-Jingū, a national significant cultural property, being a previous site of Kirishima-Jingu. After the shrine in this position was damaged by volcanic eruptions of the Ohachi vent on nearby Mt. Takachiho in 788 CE, it was moved. In November, usually on the 10th, the Tenson kōrin gojinka sai (天孫降臨御神火祭), commemorating Tenson Korin takes place there.

A panorama can be seen from the top (~970 metres), including nearby wildlife and Japanese azaleas, a group of Rhododendron.
