= Mount Karakuni =

Mountain on the island of Kyushu, Japan

- Karakunidake
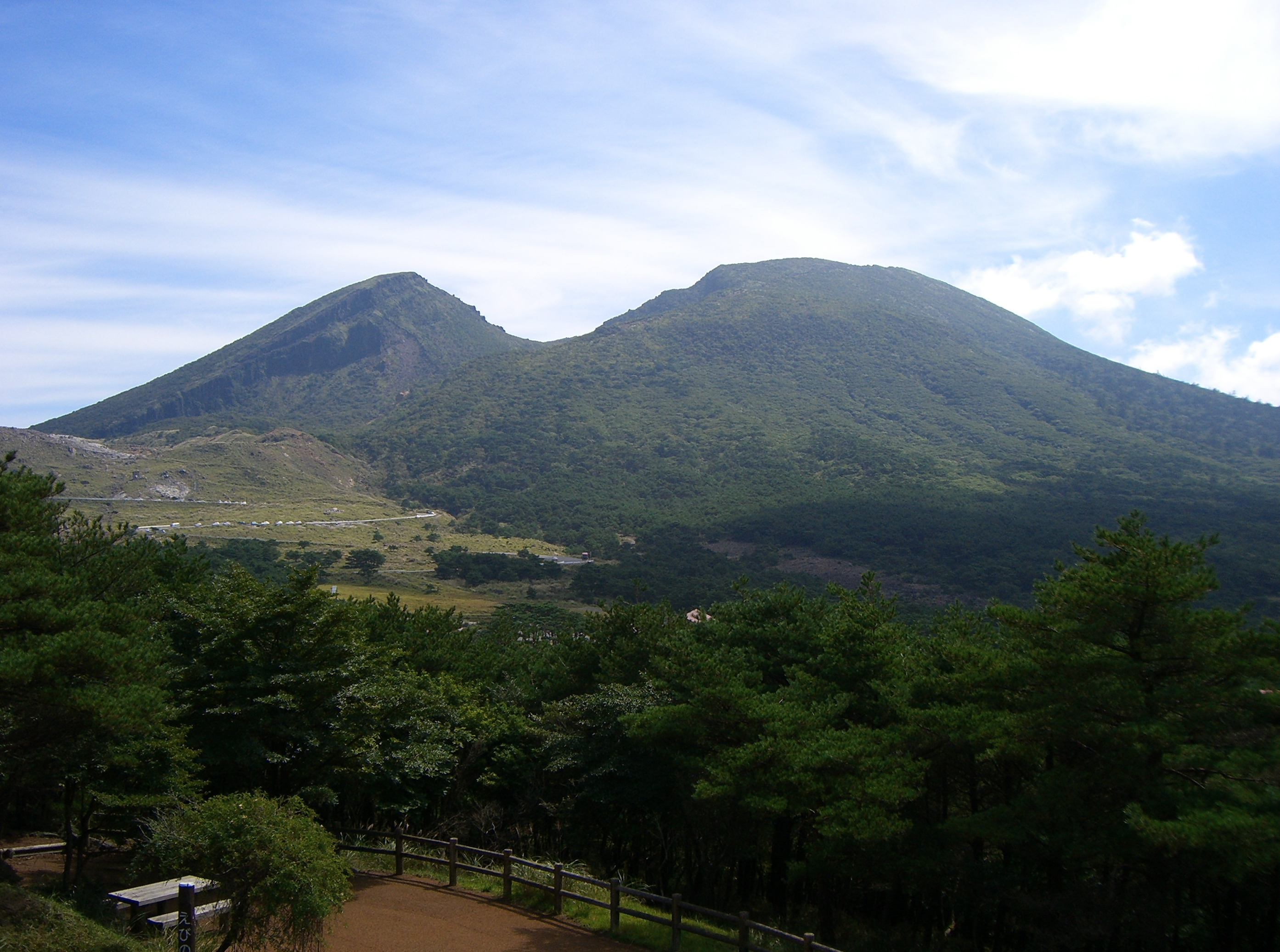
- Mount Karakuni, September 2008

Highest point
- Elevation: 1,700 m (5,600 ft)
- Prominence: 1,391 m (4,564 ft)
- Listing: Ribu
- Coordinates: 31°56′03″N 130°51′42″E

Geography
- Location within Japan
- Location: Kagoshima Prefecture - Miyazaki Prefecture, Japan

Karakunidake (韓国岳) or Mount Karakuni (1,700m) is a volcano in Kagoshima and Miyazaki Prefectures, Japan. It is part of Kirishima-Kinkowan National Park.

== Name ==
Karakunidake was named as such from two accounts before the Edo period: the first of which referred to the mountain's barren surface, and the second which claimed that climbers can see the distant Korean Peninsula across the sea.

Some maps erroneously spell its name as "唐国岳" (Karakunidake), with the kanji "唐" in place of "韓".

== See also ==
- Kirishima-Kinkowan National Park
