= Cape Nagasakibana, Kagoshima =

Cape in Japan

Cape Nagasakibana, Kagoshima 長崎鼻 長崎鼻岬
- Cape
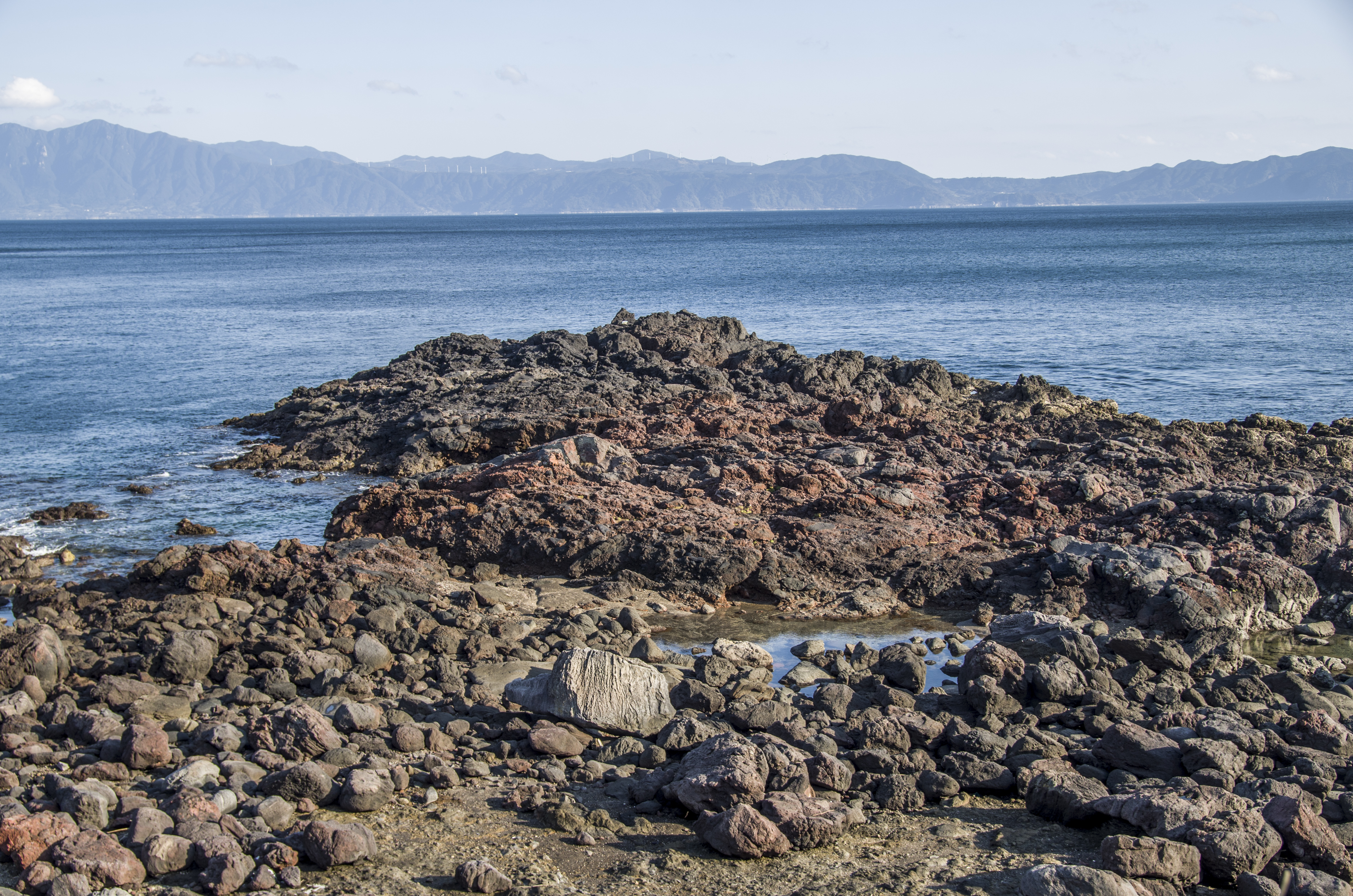
- View from Cape Nagasakibana across Kagoshima Bay entrance to the end of the Ōsumi Peninsula

- Location of Cape Nagasakibana in Japan
- Coordinates: 31°09′19″N 130°35′12″E
- Location: Satsuma Peninsula
- Offshore water bodies: Kagoshima Bay
- Formed by: Volcanic action

Nagasakibana (長崎鼻, Nagasakibana), also known as Cape Nagasakibana (長崎鼻岬, Nagasakibana Misaki) or Cape Ryūgū, is the most southern headland on the Satsuma Peninsula at the entrance to Kagoshima Bay. The cape has a lighthouse, is the location of a statue of Urashima Tarō, the fisherman in a Japanese fairy tale, and the Ryūgū Shrine.

== Geology ==
The cape is volcanic in origin and is at the southern border of the Ibusuki Volcanic Field.

== Tourism ==
There are views from the cape, which is easy to access by car, or train, of both Mount Kaimon and the Satsuma Peninsula and nearby are local botanical and zoological gardens.
