= Lake Unagi =

Maar lake on the island of Kyushu, Japan

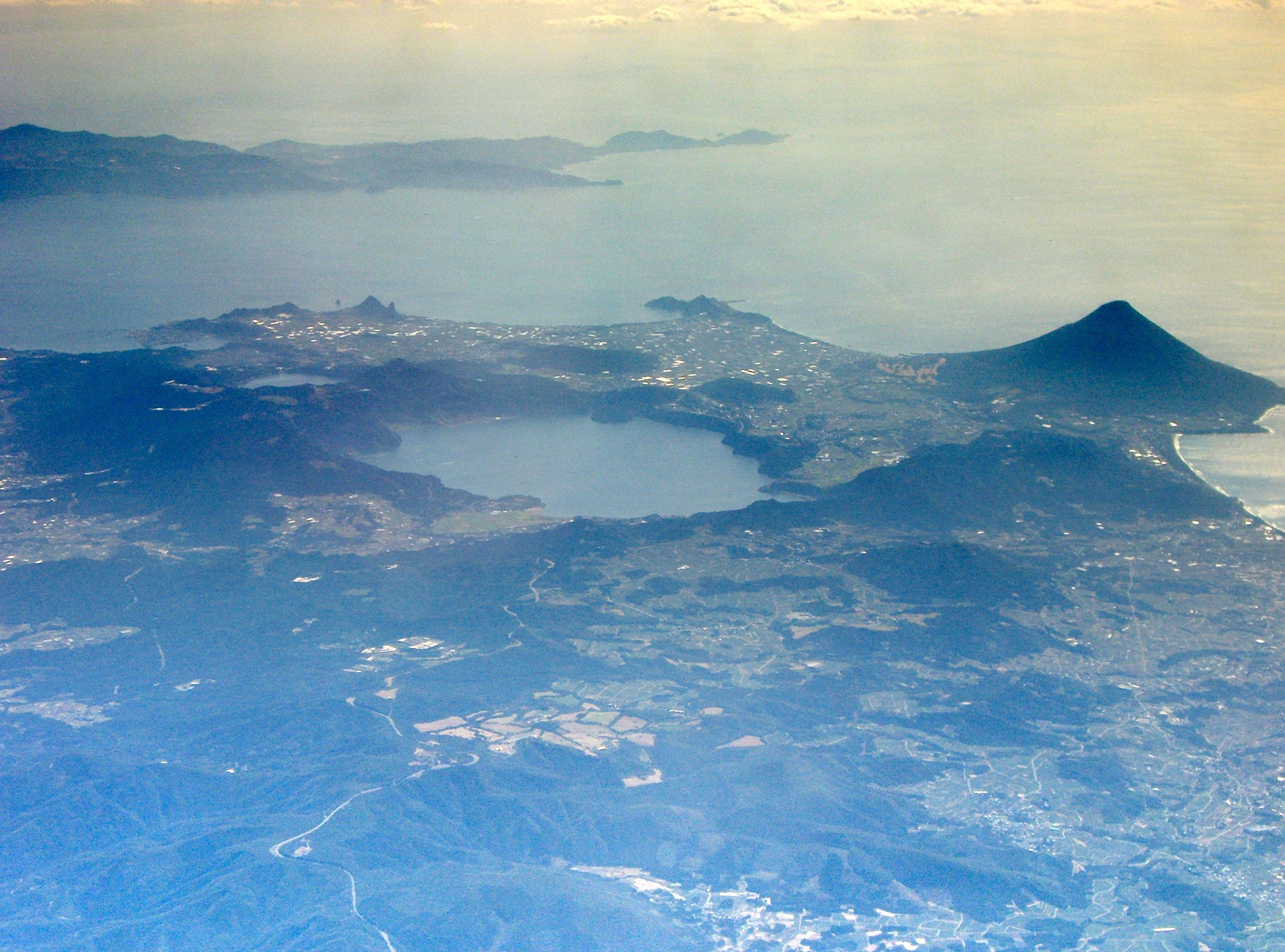
- The large lake in the foreground is Lake Ikeda but beyond it to the east (left of picture) is Lake Unagi with Cape Sata in the far distance over the waters at the head of Kagoshima Bay. The volcanic cone to the right of the picture is Mount Kaimon.
- Unagi maar and other selected volcanic features of the Ibusuki volcanic field.
- Location within Japan
- Location: Kyūshū island
- Coordinates: 31°13′25″N 130°36′21″E
- Type: maar lake
- Basin countries: Japan
- Surface area: 120 ha (300 acres)
- Average depth: 56.5 m (185 ft)
- Shore length^{1}: 4.2 km (2.6 mi)
- Surface elevation: 120 m (390 ft)
- ^{1} Shore length is not a well-defined measure.

Lake Unagi (Unagi pond) (鰻池, Unagi ike) is a Japanese maar lake associated with an eruptive vent line extending towards the sea from the parent volcano Ikeda Caldera which contains Lake Ikeda (池田湖, Ikeda-ko).

== Geography ==
It is located within the city limits of Ibusuki, Kagoshima on Kyūshū island, Japan, and there are associated hot springs.

=== Geology ===
Lake Unagi is within the larger Ibusuki volcanic field and older Ata South Caldera as technically its water fills in Unagi maar. Shortly after or during the Ikeda Caldera forming eruption of 6400 years cal BP ago a fissure vent line southeast of the caldera evolved that produced the maar eruption that formed Lake Unagi and at its far end the pumiceous Yamagawa base surge from Yamagawa maar. Ikezoko maar is more proximal in the vent line from the Ikeda Caldera to the north. Narikawa maar is to the south, between Unagi maar and the Yamagawa maar which is partially backfilled by the sea.

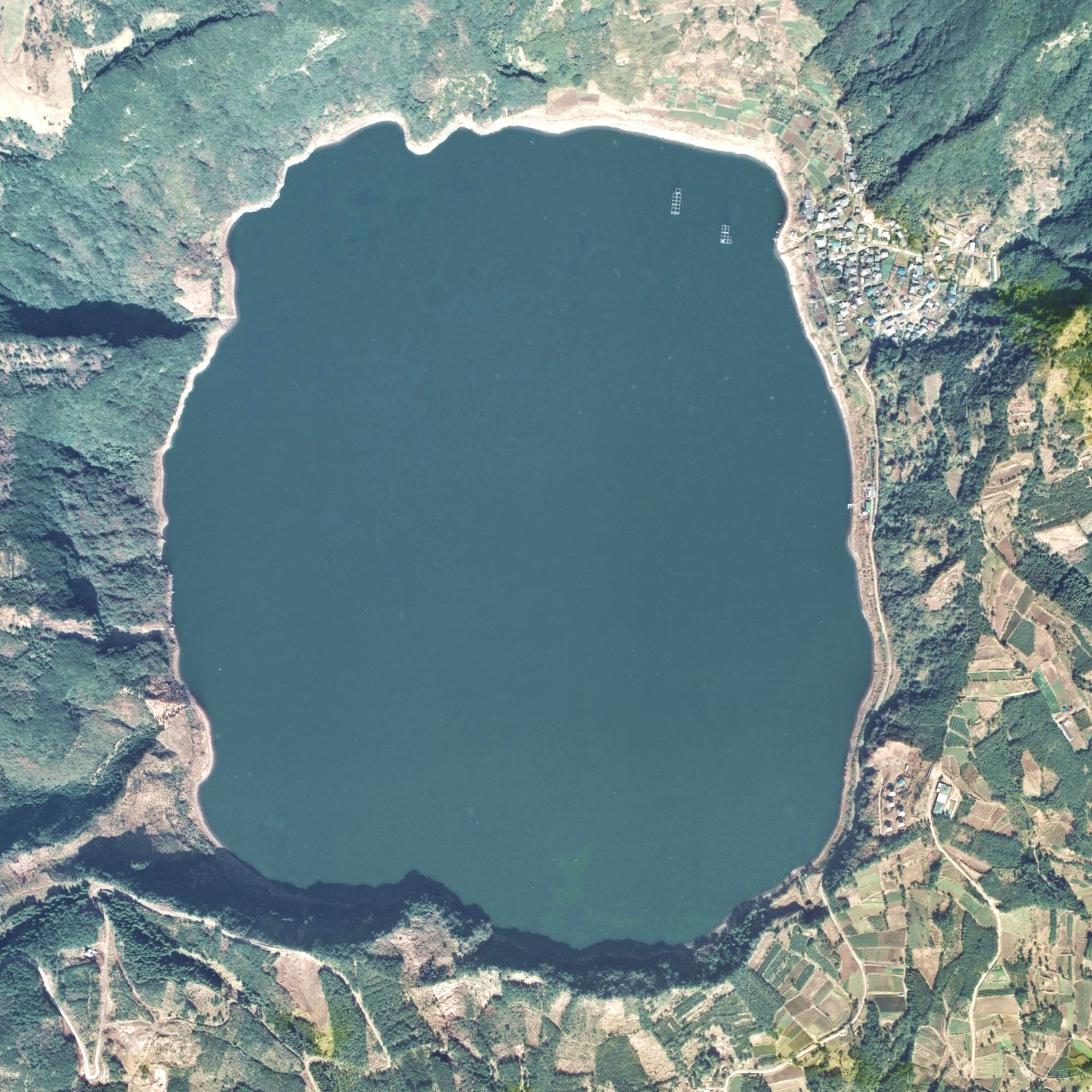
View from directly above Lake Unagi
