= Cape Nagasakibana =

Multiple Capes in Japan and associated areas

Nagasakibana (長崎鼻, Nagasakibana) is a common name used for various headlands in Japan. They may also known as Cape Nagasakibana (長崎鼻岬, Nagasakibana Misaki). The name is also used for the geothermal area in Ibusuki associated with Cape Nagasakibana, Kagoshima, and its coastal area. This coastal area of 55 km^{2} (21 sq mi) is a loggerhead sea turtle feeding ground at the southern limit in Japan of eel grass beds.

The name of the city Nagasaki (長崎, Nagasaki) means long cape and 鼻 means nose in Japanese, so helping to explain further this English language wide use in names of geographical features.

These headlands include:

Headlands in Japan called Cape Nagasakibana / Nagasakibana
Geographical description	Location	Coordinates	Notes	Photo
Cape Nagasakibana, Kagoshima	Ibusuki City, Kagoshima Prefecture	31°09′19″N 130°35′12″E	Southernmost cape of the Satsuma Peninsula at the entrance to Kagoshima Bay, Kyushu.	Cape Nagasakibana
Nagasakibana, Kagawa	Yashima, Takamatsu City, Kagawa Prefecture	34°22′56.4″N 134°05′37.5″E	Nearby there is a 5th-century burial mound	Nagasakibana, Kagawa in foreground and behind Mount Yashima
Nagasakibana, Ukushima	Ukushima, Goto Islands, Sasebo, Nagasaki Prefecture	33°16′18″N 129°06′45.6″E	At the cape there is a lighthouse.	Lighthouse at Nagasakibana, Ukushima
Nagasakibana, Tsushima Island	West coast of Tsushima Island, Nagasaki Prefecture between Korea and Japan	34°24′40″N 129°23′48″E		
Nagasakibana, Shikoku	Adjacent to Minami Bisan-Seto Bridge of Great Seto Bridge from Honshu to Shikoku, Kagawa Prefecture	34°21′10″N 133°49′10″E		
Nagasakibana, Ojika	On Ojika Island, Ojika, Nagasaki Prefecture, Kyushu	33°13′00″N 129°02′49″E		
Nagasakibana, Chiba	Chōshi, Chiba Prefecture	35°41′33″N 140°51′55″E	Projects into Pacific Ocean with a 21 m (69 ft) tower at tip	Nagasakibana, Chōshi.
Nagasakibana, Ōita	Kunisaki Peninsula, Ōita Prefecture	33°41′04″N 131°31′23″E	Described as "cape of flowers and art"	
