= Ikeda Caldera =

Caldera in Kagoshima Prefecture, Japan

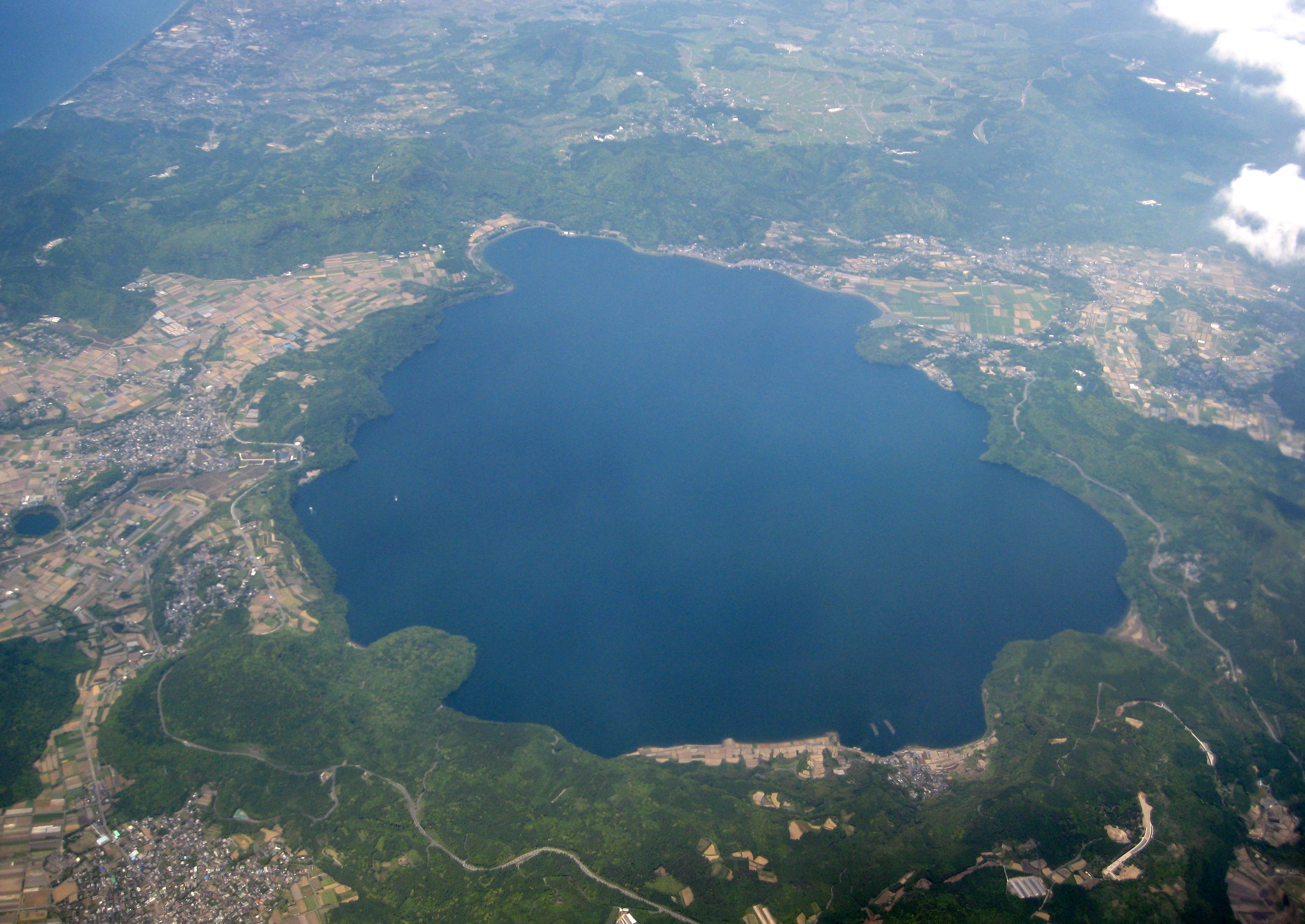
- Lake Ikeda seen from the southeast

Highest point
- Peak: Nabeshimadake, 31°13′12″N 130°34′01″E
- Elevation: 256 m (840 ft)
- Coordinates: 31°14′N 130°34′E

Dimensions
- Length: 4 km (2.5 mi) NS
- Width: 5 km (3.1 mi) EW
- Area: 11 km^{2} (4.2 mi^{2})

Naming
- Native name: 池田カルデラ (Japanese)

Geography
- Location within Japan
- Ikeda Caldera and other selected volcanic features of the Ibusuki volcanic field.
- Location: Ibusuki, Kagoshima, Japan
- Country: Japan
- State: Kagoshima Prefecture
- Region: Ibusuki

Geology
- Rock age: from 20,000 years before present
- Mountain type: Caldera
- Last eruption: 2,800 years before present

Ikeda Caldera (池田カルデラ, Ikeda karudera) is a volcanic caldera filled now with Lake Ikeda and associated with the older Ata Caldera on the Satsuma Peninsula.

== Geology ==
The Ikeda volcano produced about 20,000 years BP the Iwamoto tephra layer found right around the region of Kagoshima Bay but not further. It soon after erupted Senta lava before the about 7300 years BP eruption of the Kikai-Akahoya tephra at the Kikai Caldera.

The caldera-forming eruptions began 6400 years cal BP involving by the time they had finished about 5 km^{3} (1.2 cu mi) of magma and produced local pyroclastic deposits starting with the Ikezaki tephra (Ik-Ikz) and base surge of 0.03 km^{3} (0.0072 cu mi). In subsequent magmatic eruptions deposits were created of Osagari (Ik-Os of 0.16 km^{3} (0.038 cu mi)) and Mizusako scoria (Ik-Mz of 0.002 km^{3} (0.00048 cu mi)), followed by the Ikeda pumice (Ik-Pfa of 2.3 km^{3} (0.55 cu mi)). This tephra has also been called the Ikedako tephra and the eruption assigned a VEI of 5. The present caldera was formed when the Ikeda ignimbrite (2.5 km^{3} (0.60 cu mi)) erupted that reached the eastern and western sides and southern tip of the Satsuma Peninsula. The north western wall of this caldera aligns with the Onkadobira fault scarp, which is also a boundary of the Ata South Caldera.

This was followed closely by later eruptions including the Ikedako tephra (3.5 km^{3} (0.84 cu mi)) and those from a fissure vent line southeast of the caldera that produced the pumiceous Yamagawa base surge (from Yamagawa maar, 0.04 km^{3} (0.0096 cu mi)) in a line of eruptions that also created Ikezoko maar, Unagi maar (now Lake Unagi) and Narikawa maar. A central lava dome was formed within the caldera during the late stage of these eruptions. About 2,800 years ago on part of the margin of the caldera rim the andesitic Nabeshimadake lava dome was formed. During the caldera forming events, and after, about 2.5 km^{3} (0.60 cu mi) of ignimbrite and 7 km^{3} (1.7 cu mi) of tephra was erupted with each of the tephra deposits reaching into the Ōsumi Peninsula due to the prevailing winds.

Ikeda Caldera is associated in the Ibusuki volcanic field with the more recently active Kaimondake stratovolcano. The National Catalogue of the Active Volcanoes of Japan (JMA, 2013) includes features of the Ibusuki volcanic field as part of the Ata post-caldera system.

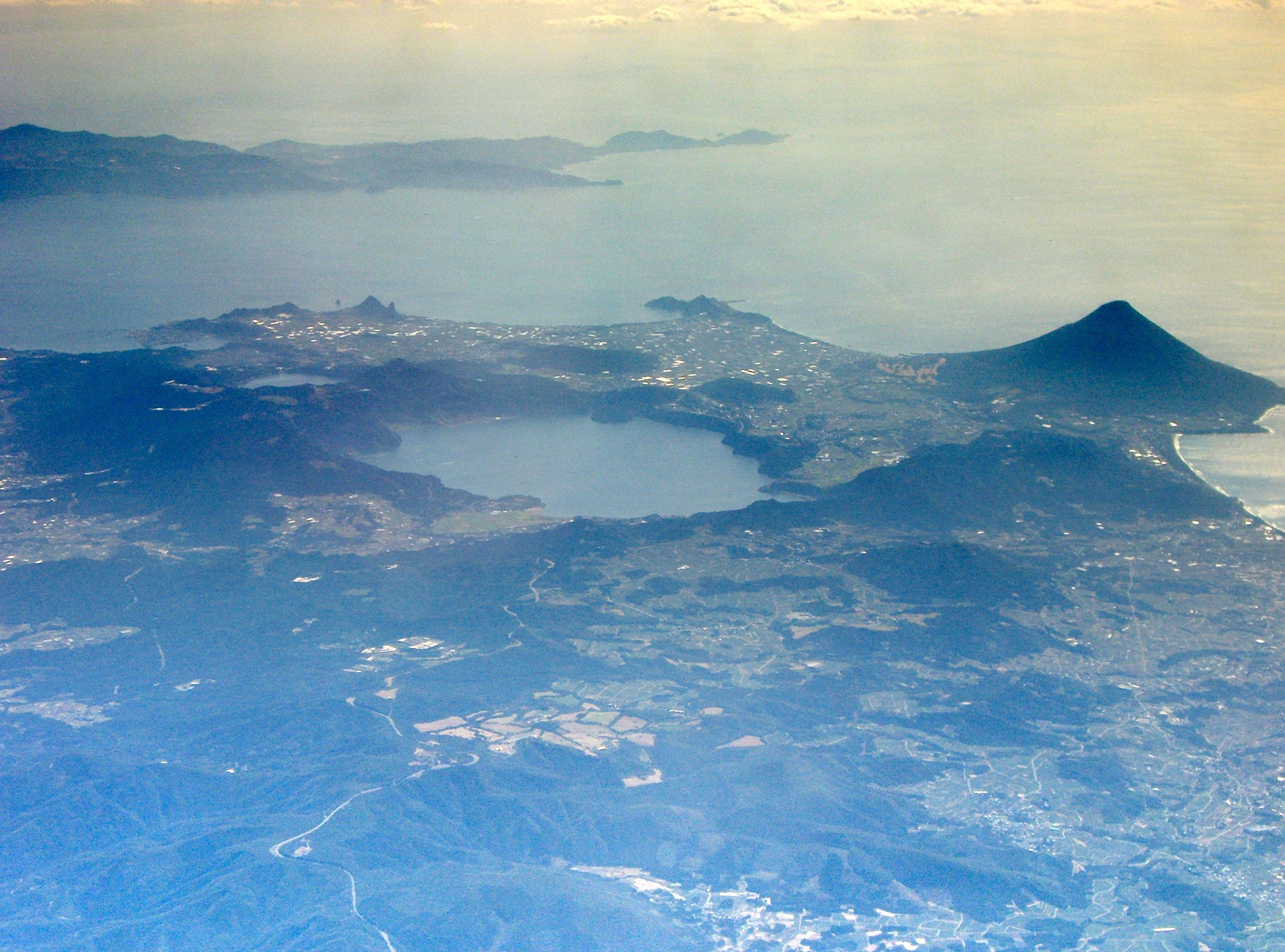
Lake Ikeda seen from NNW

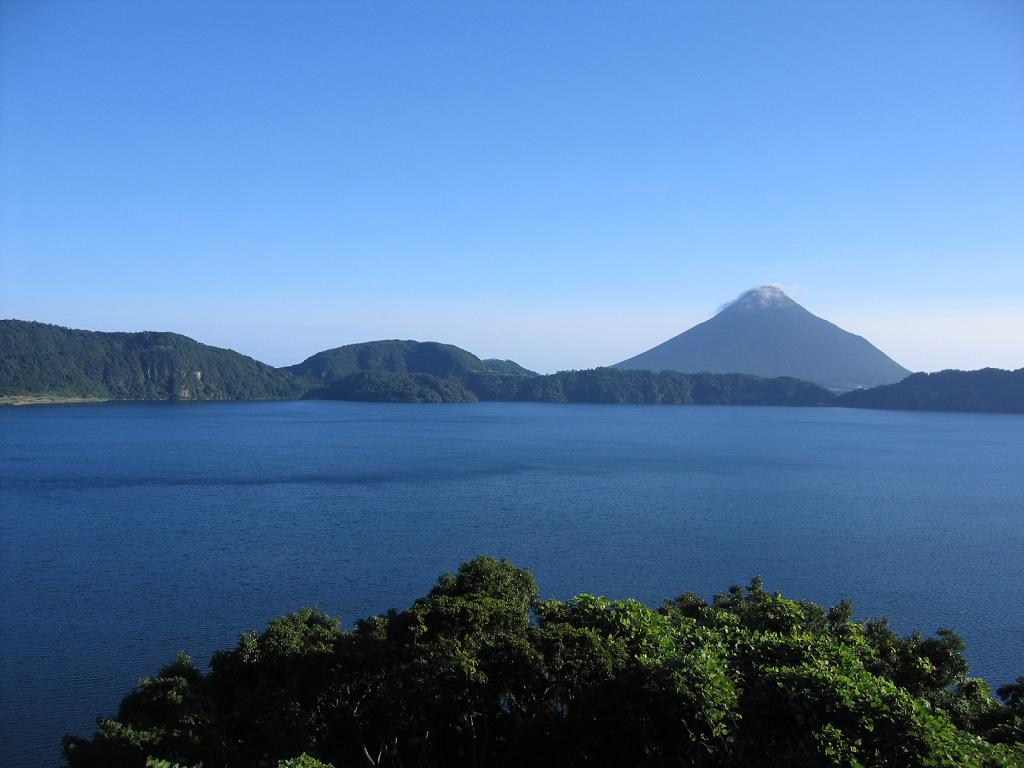
Lake Ikeda with Kaimon Volcano

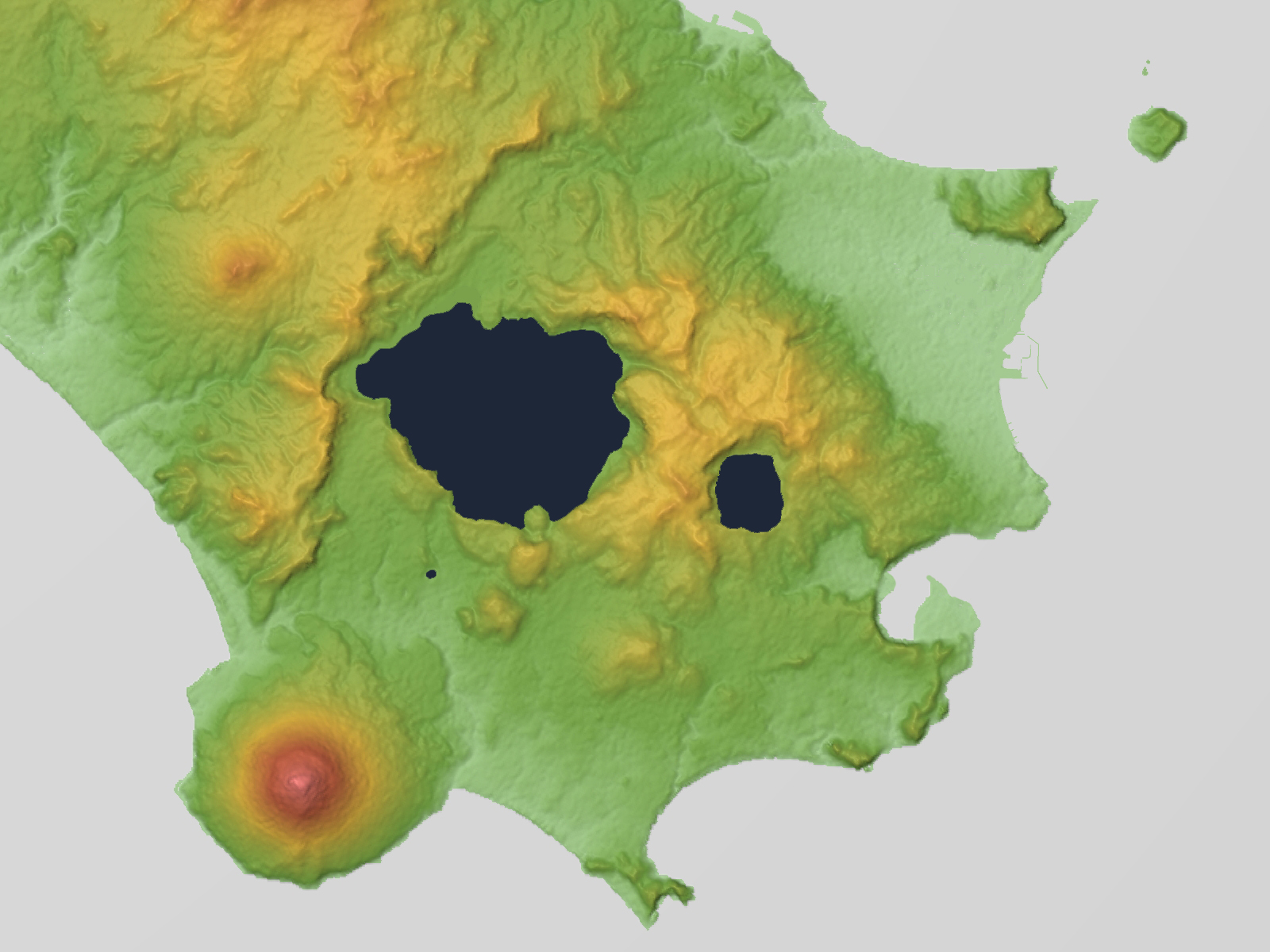
Relief map of the Ibusuki volcanic field. Ikeda Caldera in the center left.
