= Ibusuki volcanic field =

Volcanic area on the island of Kyushu, Japan

Ibusuki volcanic field Ibusuki Volcano, Ibusuki Volcanic Group
- Volcanic area
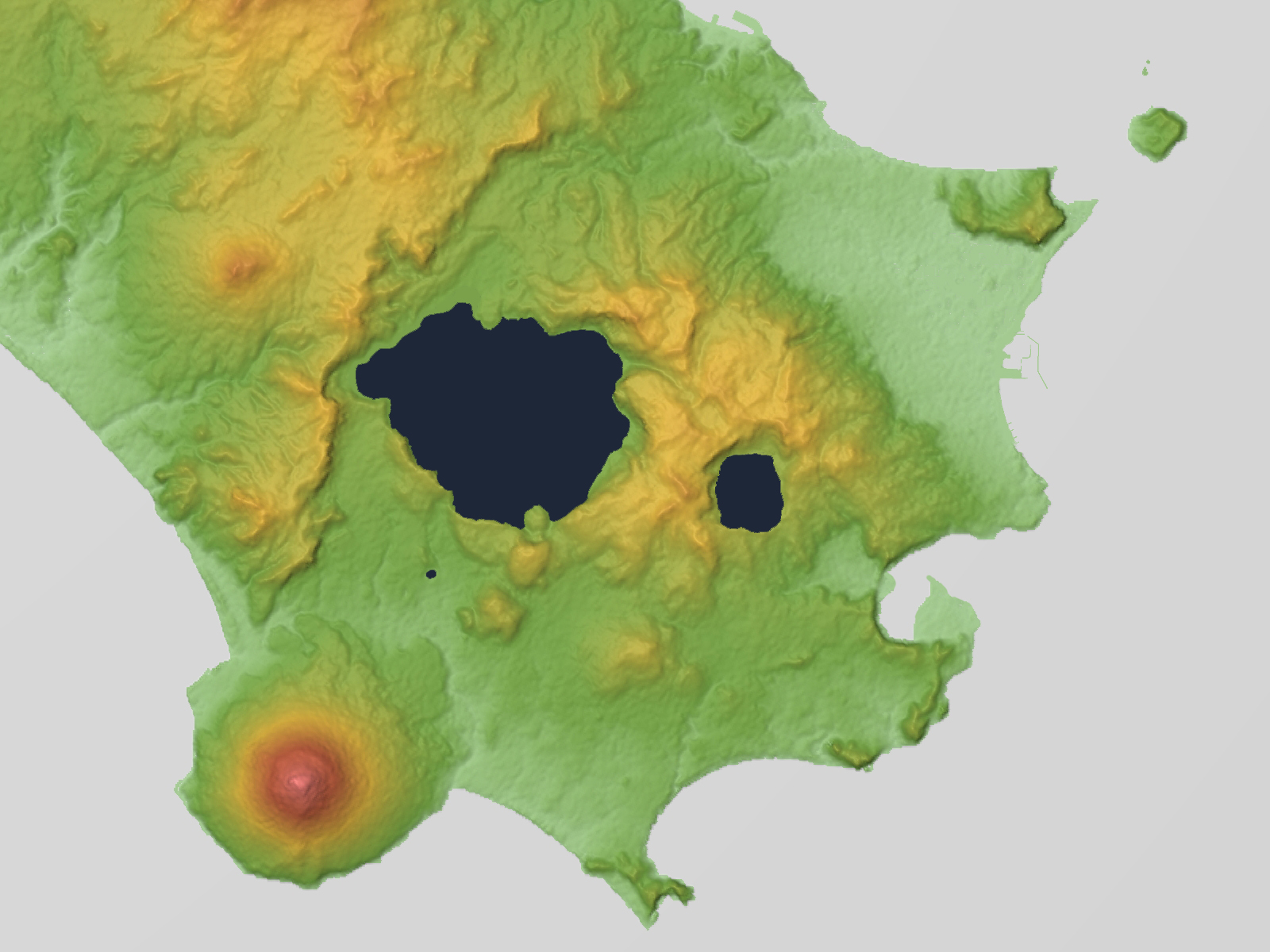
- Ibusuki volcanic field Relief Map
- Map of selected volcanic features of the Ibusuki volcanic field. Location of Ibusuki volcanic field in Japan
- Location within Japan
- Coordinates: 31°14′00″N 130°35′00″E
- Location: Satsuma Peninsula
- Water bodies: Kagoshima Bay, Pacific Ocean
- Age: Holocene
- Formed by: Volcanic action
- Geology: Shimanto supergroup overlaid by volcanic rocks
- Highest elevation: 924 m (3,031 ft) (Mount Kaimon)

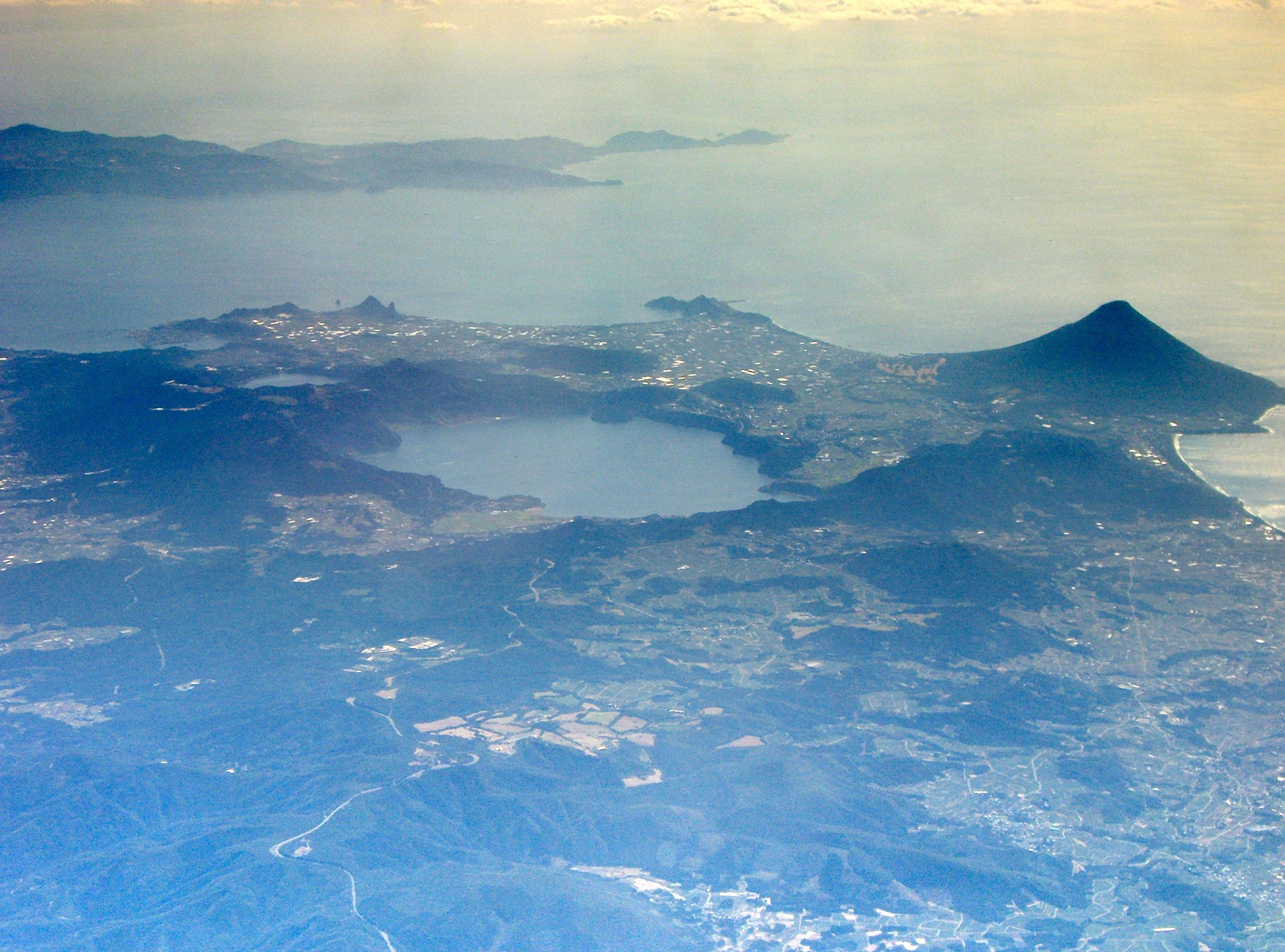
View over the Ibusuki volcanic field with Ikeda Caldera (centre left) and Mount Kaimon (right)

The Ibusuki volcanic field, also known as the Ibusuki Volcano or Ibusuki Volcanic Group (指宿火山群), is an area of current volcanic and geothermal activity at the tip of the Satsuma Peninsula, Kagoshima prefecture, Kyushu, Japan. It is administered as part of Ibusuki City and Kirishima-Kinkowan National Park. Geologically it is usually now regarded as part of the Ata South Caldera.

== Geology ==
The Ibusuki volcanic field is at the eastern margins of the Ata Caldera and has been estimated to contain 54 km^{3} (13 cu mi) of volcanic material. The Ibusuki volcanic field includes the following recent active volcanoes and their vents:

- Mount Kaimon stratovolcano 31°10′48″N 130°31′42″E
  - Last erupted in 885 CE
- Mizunashi maar 31°12′28″N 130°32′47″E
  - Erupted about 2090 BCE
- Kagami maar 31°12′38″N 130°33′02″E
  - Erupted about 2090 BCE
- Kasagadake lava dome
  - Erupted about 5000 BCE
- Tsujinodake lava dome 31°11′57″N 130°35′16″E
  - Erupted about 6000 BCE
- Washiodake lava dome 31°13′22″N 130°35′42″E
  - Erupted about 10000 BCE
- Nabeshimadake lava dome 31°13′12″N 130°34′01″E
  - Formed about 2,800 years ago
- Ikeda Caldera 31°14′N 130°34′E
  - Present caldera was formed 4800 years ago
- Kiyomidake lava dome 31°14′56″N 130°35′10″E
  - Erupted about 8000 BCE
- Karayama stratovolcano 31°15′01″N 130°35′48″E
  - Erupted about 23000 BCE
- Ikezoko maar 31°14′05″N 130°35′57″E
  - Last erupted more recently than 4800 years ago
- Unagi maar 31°49′00″N 130°28′00″E
  - Last erupted more recently than 4800 years ago
- Narikawa maar31°12′25″N 130°37′11″E
  - Last erupted more recently than 4800 years ago
- Yamagawa maar 31°12′28″N 130°38′06″E
  - Last erupted pumice more recently than 4800 years ago

=== Geothermal ===
There are about 800 hot springs within 5 km (3.1 mi) of the sea at the southeastern tip of the Satsuma Peninsula. The relatively recently commissioned Yamagawa Binary Power Station uses local geothermal power to generate up to 4990 kW.

=== Tectonics ===
The north western sector of the zone is limited by the Onkadobira fault scarp which has been interpreted as part of the rim of the Ata Caldera. The volcanism is associated with the subduction of the Philippine Sea Plate under the Eurasian Plate.

== Risk ==
The field has both tectonic and volcanic risks. With regard to volcanic risks currently the area is in the longest period between eruptions for the last 4000 years. Earthquake swarms that do not appear to be related to the volcanoes have been described. Seismic activation of local faults in the area occurred immediately after the megathrust 2011 Tōhoku earthquake which had its epicenter 1,350 km (840 mi) away.
