= Satamisaki Lighthouse =

Satamisaki Lighthouse Sata Misaki 佐多岬灯台
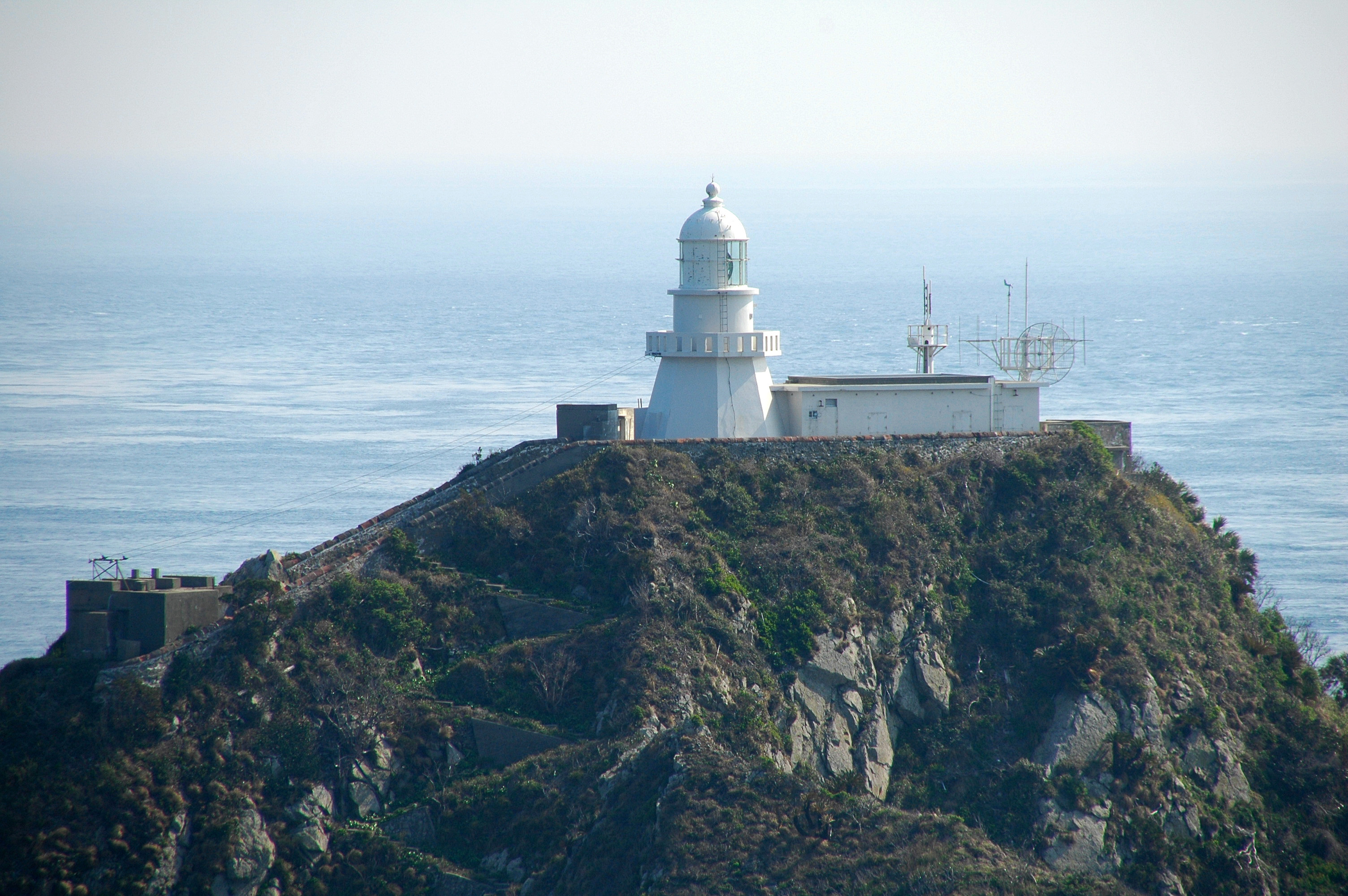
- Satamisaki Lighthouse
- Location: Cape Sata; Minamiōsumi, Kagoshima; Japan
- Coordinates: 30°59′31.6″N 130°39′34″E

Tower
- Constructed: October 18, 1871 (first)
- Construction: concrete tower
- Height: 12.6 metres (41 ft)
- Shape: octagonal tower with balcony and lantern
- Markings: white tower and lantern

Light
- First lit: 1950 (current)
- Focal height: 68 metres (223 ft)
- Lens: Third order Fresnel
- Intensity: 400,000 Candela
- Range: main: 21.5 nautical miles (24.7 mi; 39.8 km) reserve: 12 nautical miles (14 mi; 22 km)
- Characteristic: Fl (2) W 16s.
- Japan no.: JCG-6701

Satamisaki Lighthouse (佐多岬灯台, Satamisaki tōdai) is a lighthouse on Cape Sata, in the town of Minamiōsumi, Kagoshima Prefecture Japan. The lighthouse is located within the borders of the Kirishima-Kinkowan National Park. It has been selected as one of "Japan's 50 best lighthouses".

== History ==
This lighthouse is one of eight lighthouses that were built in Meiji period Japan under the provisions of the Anglo-Japanese Treaty of Amity and Commerce of 1858, signed by the Bakumatsu period Tokugawa Shogunate, the need for a lighthouse at Cape Sata for the safety of vessels was recognized at an early time after Japan was opened to the West. The lighthouse was designed and constructed by British engineer Richard Henry Brunton, born 1841 in Kincardineshire, Scotland, who was under contract by the new Meiji government. Brunton constructed another 25 lighthouses from far northern Hokkaidō to southern Kyūshū during his career in Japan.

This lighthouse stands on the cliffs of Owa Island, off the coast of Cape Sata at the tip of the Ōsumi Peninsula in Kagoshima Prefecture. This cape is located at the southernmost tip of Kyushu, and is considered the southernmost tip of mainland Japan.

Work began in January of 1870. It was first lit on October 18, 1871; 154 years ago. The original lighthouse was made of cast iron. This lighthouse was destroyed by an attack during the Pacific War on March 18, 1945 . The present lighthouse is a replica of the original lighthouse, but constructed of concrete. It was electrified on January 23, 1952. In 1954, rain containing radioactive fallout from nuclear tests in the South Pacific occurred in various parts of Japan. Lighthouse personnel who relied on rainwater for drinking water developed radiation sickness. The lighthouse has been unattended since February 21, 1985.

== See also ==
- List of lighthouses in Japan
