= Unagi (disambiguation) =

Unagi is the Japanese word for freshwater eels.

Unagi may also refer to:

- The Eel (film), a 1997 film originally titled The Eel
- Lake Unagi, a maar lake in Kyūshū, Japan
- Unagi Sayaka (born 1989), Japanese professional wrestler
- Unagi, the codename for the media playback engine derived from Winamp core technologies
- Unagi, a character in the Japanese visual novel Popotan
- A series of episodes ("Unagi", "Unagi II", etc.) in the French TV show Kaamelott
- "The One with Unagi", an episode of Friends
