= Cape Sata =

Cape in Kyūshū island, Japan

Cape Sata (佐多岬, Sata Misaki)
- Cape
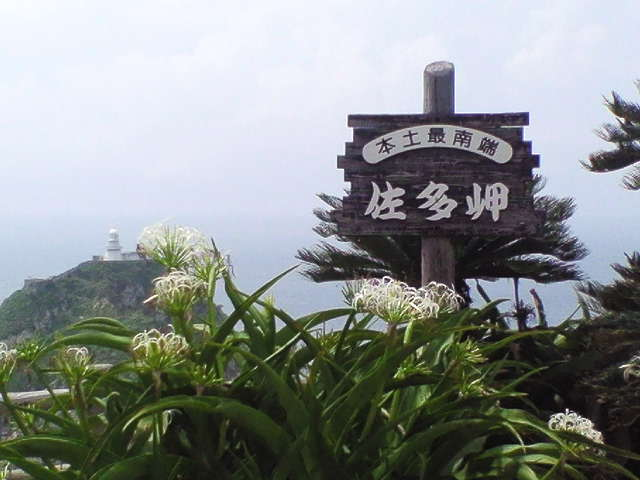
- Cape Sata

- Coordinates: 30°59′39″N 130°39′38.3″E
- Location: Kyūshū island, Japan
- Offshore water bodies: Sea of Japan

Cape Sata (佐多岬, Sata Misaki) is a cape at the southern tip of the Ōsumi Peninsula of Kyūshū island, Japan. It is the southernmost point of the island, and therefore of the overall Japanese Home Islands (Hokkaidō, Honshū, Shikoku, and Kyūshū), just south of 31 degrees latitude. It belongs to the town of Minamiōsumi, Kagoshima Prefecture. It is within the borders of the Kirishima-Kinkōwan National Park, in the town of Minamiōsumi.

The area contains a Shinto shrine, the Misaki Shrine, and is also home to the Satamisaki Lighthouse built in 1871, designed by the Scotsman Richard Henry Brunton.

Until October 29, 2012, the land was under the jurisdiction of a private company, which charged admission for entry to the area; however, the land was sold to the municipality of Minamiōsumi and is now free to enter.

Alan Booth's 1986 book The Roads to Sata details his walk from Cape Sōya at the northern tip of Hokkaidō south to Cape Sata.

== Gallery ==
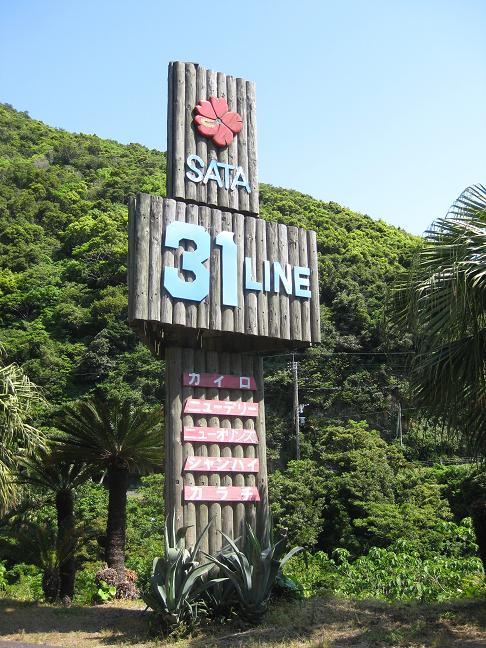
Monument at latitude 31°N

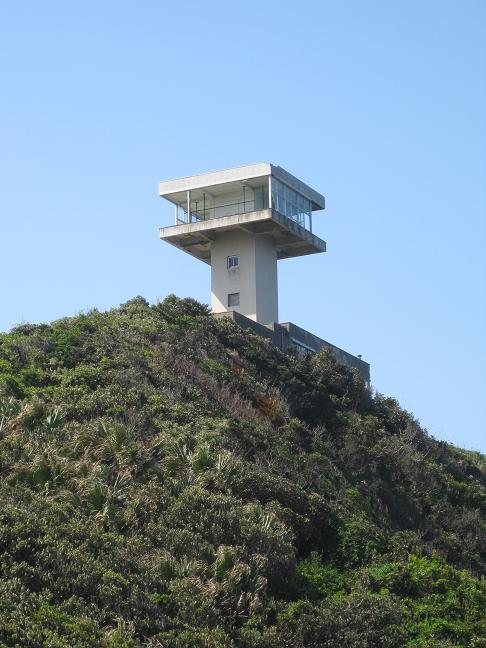
Cape Sata Observatory

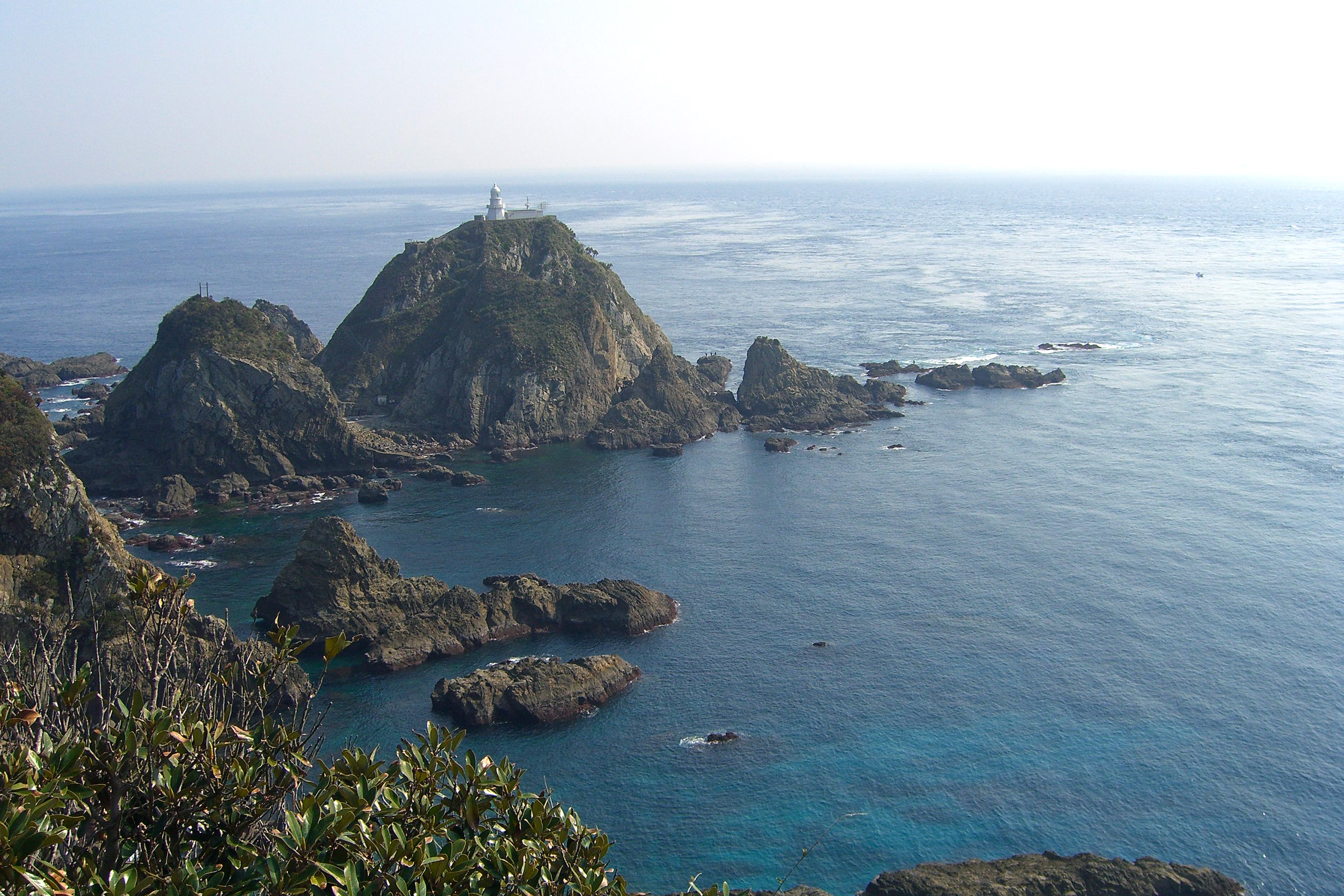
Cape Sata lighthouse from Sata-misaki Observation Park

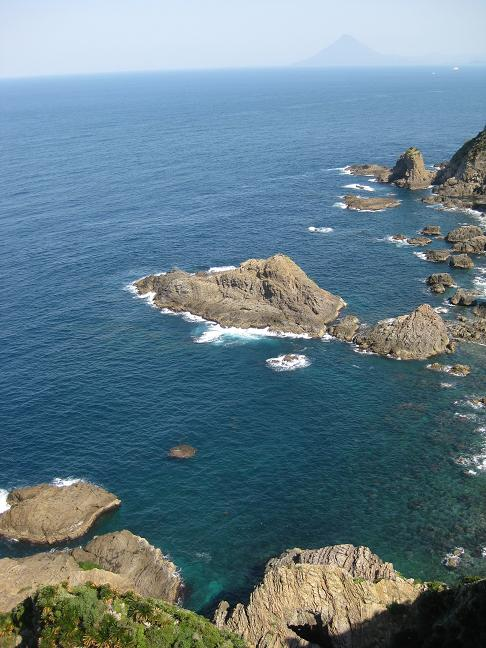
Mount Kaimon on the Satsuma Peninsula over the sea

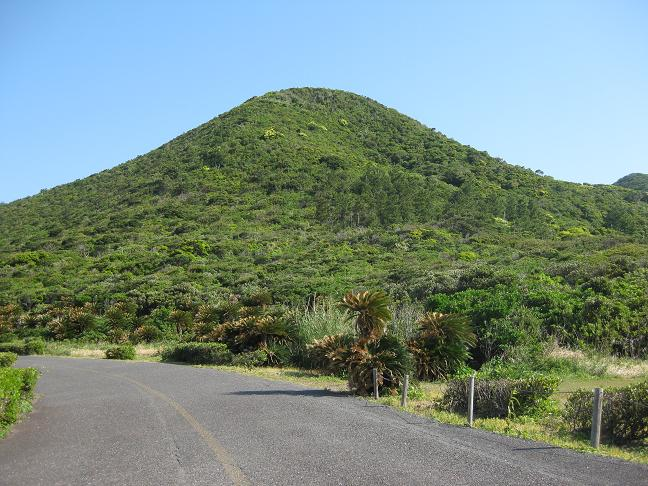
Satamisaki Road Park

== See also ==
- Extreme points of Japan
