= Alan Booth =

English travel writer

- Born: 5 December 1946; London, England
- Died: 24 January 1993 (aged 46); Tokyo, Japan
- Occupation: Writer
- Writing career
- Notable work: The Roads to Sata (1985)

Alan Booth (5 December 1946 – 24 January 1993) was an English writer who wrote two books about his journeys on foot through the Japanese countryside. The better-known of the two, The Roads to Sata, published in 1985, is about his travels in 1977 from Cape Sōya, the northern tip of Hokkaidō, to Cape Sata, the southern tip of Kyūshū. The second, Looking for the Lost, was published posthumously in 1995. Booth also wrote a guidebook to Japan, as well as numerous articles on Japan and other topics.

== Biography ==
Booth was born in Leytonstone, London, and studied drama at Leyton County High School for Boys. While he was still at school he formed and directed the Leyton Youth Theatre Company, for which Leyton Borough Council provided a grant and free use of public buildings for performances, including productions of Hamlet and Othello.

Booth studied drama at the University of Birmingham, where he became a prominent member of its Guild Theatre Group (GTG). Among the plays he directed for the GTG were Hamlet (First Quarto), done in Booth's version of Noh style, and his own translation of Racine's Phèdre, set in a samurai milieu. He also directed an open-air production of Marlowe's Faustus in Cannon Hill Park. He was a regular contributor to Mermaid, the university's magazine of students' verse, and won the Birmingham Post's Annual Poetry Prize.

In 1970 Booth moved to Japan to study Noh theatre, but soon began writing. For the next 20 years he lived in Tokyo and worked for the Macmillan Press, and as a film reviewer for the Asahi Evening News. He also appeared in the BBC Learning Zone programme Japanese Language and People, episode 6, "On the Road", in which he was interviewed about aspects of life in Japan.

Alan Booth died of colon cancer in 1993, leaving his second wife, Su-chzeng Ong, and their daughter, actress Mirai Booth-Ong.
