= Ata Caldera =

Mostly-submerged caldera in Kagoshima Prefecture, Japan

- Location within Japan
- Map showing the Ata calderas (red) within the Kagoshima graben (black) with the other graben caldera (violet) and active volcanoes as symbols

Highest point
- Peak: Mount Kaimon, 31°10′48″N 130°31′42″E
- Elevation: 924 m (3,031 ft)
- Coordinates: 31°24′N 130°38′E

Dimensions
- Length: 25 km (16 mi) NS
- Width: 15 km (9.3 mi) EW

Naming
- Native name: 阿多カルデラ (Japanese)

Geography
- Location: Kagoshima, Japan
- Country: Japan
- State: Kagoshima Prefecture
- Region: Ibusuki, Kagoshima, Kimotsuki District, Tarumizu
- Geological Subdivisions: Ata South Caldera, Ata North Caldera, Ikeda Caldera

Geology
- Rock age: Pleistocene (240,000 years ago) onwards
- Mountain type(s): Caldera; Somma volcano
- Last eruption: 885 CE

Ata Caldera (阿多カルデラ, Ata karudera), containing the Ata North Caldera (AtaN Caldera), and the Ata South Caldera (AtaS Caldera), which in turn contains Mount Kaimon and Ikeda Caldera amongst other volcanoes, is a massive, ill defined, mostly submerged volcanic caldera structure associated with the southern portions of Kagoshima Bay.

== Geology ==
The earliest tephra assigned to the volcano, is the widespread on regional sea bed cores, Ata–Torihama tephra (Ata-Th) at 240,000 years before the present.

The caldera contributed to an eruption which has been dated to about 100,000 years before present (range by various techniques mostly fall 100,000 to 109,000) that generated the Ata tephra in southern Japan. This eruption has been assigned a VEI of 7.5 and generated over 300 km^{3} (72 cu mi) of tephra. This is overlaid in some places in Japan by the more recent Mitake No. 1 (On-Pm1) tephra from an eruption in the Mount Ontake area and K-Tz tephra from the Kikai Caldera. There have been many more lesser eruptions.

=== Structure ===
Increasingly the recent literature separates the caldera into a northern almost completely submerged caldera that generated the Ata tephra and Ata ignimbrite, and a southern caldera which includes the recently active Ikeda Caldera and the Kaimondake stratovolcano in the Ibusuki Volcanic Field. The southern caldera first had the Ata name but is not believed now to be associated with the vents of the major eruption of 100,000 years ago. High resolution Bouguer gravity imaging of Kyushu is consistent with the larger caldera being the Ata North Caldera but suggests it may be centered near the island of Chiringashima, and that the Ata South Caldera is the smaller in size, overlaps it being centred near Yamagawafukumoto district.

The National Catalogue of the Active Volcanoes of Japan (JMA, 2013) included features of the Ibusuki Volcanic Field as part of the Ata post-caldera system. By this definition the single caldera may be a rounded triangle about 30 km (19 mi) in length and up to 25 km (16 mi) in width, although the usual quoted size is smaller.

=== Relationships ===
Immediately adjacent to the north of the caldera is the Sakurajima volcano in Aira Caldera and further away to the south along what has been termed the Kagoshima graben is the Kikai Caldera. This alignment was first described by Tadaiti Matumoto in the 1940s. The alignment extends all the way north past Mount Kirishima to intersect the Aso Caldera by gravitational anomaly. The tectonic processes are rather complex in this region involving the larger Philippine Sea plate and Eurasian plate where the smaller Okinawa plate is colliding with the Amur plate and the larger Pacific plate is subducting under both.
