= The Roads to Sata =

Book by Alan Booth

- First edition
- Author: Alan Booth
- Language: English
- Genre: Travel
- Publisher: John Weatherhill Inc
- Publication date: First published 1985; republished September 1, 1990
- Publication place: British
- Media type: Print Hardcover & Paperback
- Pages: 282 pp
- ISBN: 978-0-670-80776-5 (1st Edition Hardcover)
- OCLC: 14399539

The Roads to Sata, written in 1985 by Alan Booth, tells the story of his journey in 1977, on foot, from Cape Sōya in Hokkaidō, the northernmost point of Japan, to Sata, the southernmost point of the main islands of Japan. Booth's journey lasted 128 days and covered 2,000 miles. The book was originally published by John Weatherhill Inc in 1985 and was republished by Kodansha Globe in 1997 in paperback.
