= Lake Ikeda =

Caldera on the island of Kyushu, Japan

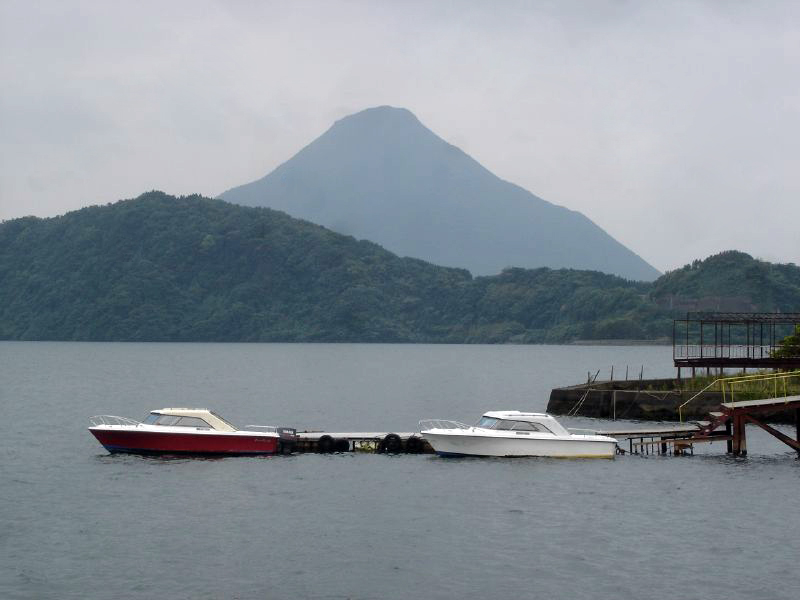
- Lake Ikeda with Mount Kaimon

- Location within Japan
- Location: Kyūshū island
- Coordinates: 31°14′N 130°34′E
- Type: caldera lake
- Catchment area: 41 km^{2} (16 sq mi)
- Basin countries: Japan
- Surface area: 11 km^{2} (4.2 sq mi)
- Average depth: 135 m (443 ft)
- Max. depth: 233 m (764 ft)
- Water volume: 1.47 km^{3} (1,190,000 acre⋅ft)
- Residence time: 1.7 years
- Shore length^{1}: 15.1 km (9.4 mi)
- Surface elevation: 63 m (207 ft)
- ^{1} Shore length is not a well-defined measure.

Lake Ikeda (池田湖, Ikeda-ko) is in Ikeda Caldera located 40 km (25 mi) south of Kagoshima city; Kyūshū island, Japan. It is perhaps best known to tourists as the location of the purported sightings of a monster named Issie, and as the largest lake on Kyūshū island with a surface area of 11 km^{2} (4.2 sq mi) and a shoreline length of 15 km (9.3 mi).

== Deterioration ==
The development of the areas surrounding Lake Ikeda has caused the quality of the water to decline since 1955. An irrigation project developed for agricultural and residential purposes was initiated in 1965, wherein the courses of three nearby rivers were diverted into the lake. The irrigation system has been in operation since 1982, resulting in a considerable improvement of the water quality. However, since the 1950s the transparency of the lake, despite still being ranked No. 7 in the world, has decreased from 26.8 m (88 ft) to approximately 5 m (16 ft).

== Animals ==
Lake Ikeda is known to harbour large eels, some six feet in length. In 1998, a benthological survey was conducted in the lake, which found that there were no zoobenthos, although two tubificid oligochaetes and a chironomid were found. The lake was already considered oligotrophic until the 1940s, but one theory for the further drop in underwater life is that the existing life in Lake Ikeda has been affected by climate change.

== Geology ==
It is within the Ikeda Caldera and surrounded by its rim and associated volcanic domes.

== Mythology ==
Lake Ikeda is important in the local Shinto folklore of the surrounding regions. Local religious tradition originally held the lake as the origin of humankind.

=== Issie ===
Issie (イッシー, Isshī) is a Japanese lake monster said to lurk in Lake Ikeda. It is described as being saurian in appearance. The naming convention is analogous to "Nessie" (the Loch Ness Monster).

According to mythology, Issie was a white mare who lived together with her foal on the shore of Lake Ikeda. However, when the foal was kidnapped by a samurai and Issie was unable to find it, she jumped into the lake and her despair transformed her into a giant, saurian beast, which since then frequently surfaces, trying to find her lost child. The creature was reportedly photographed in 1978 by a man who went by the name "Mr. Matsubara". Twenty other people reportedly also saw the creature swimming in the lake in 1978; they described it as black and having two humps, each about 5 meters (16 feet) long.

== See also ==
- List of lakes in japan
- List of volcanoes in Japan
