= Mount Kaimon =

Volcano on the island of Kyushu, Japan

Kaimondake
- 開聞岳
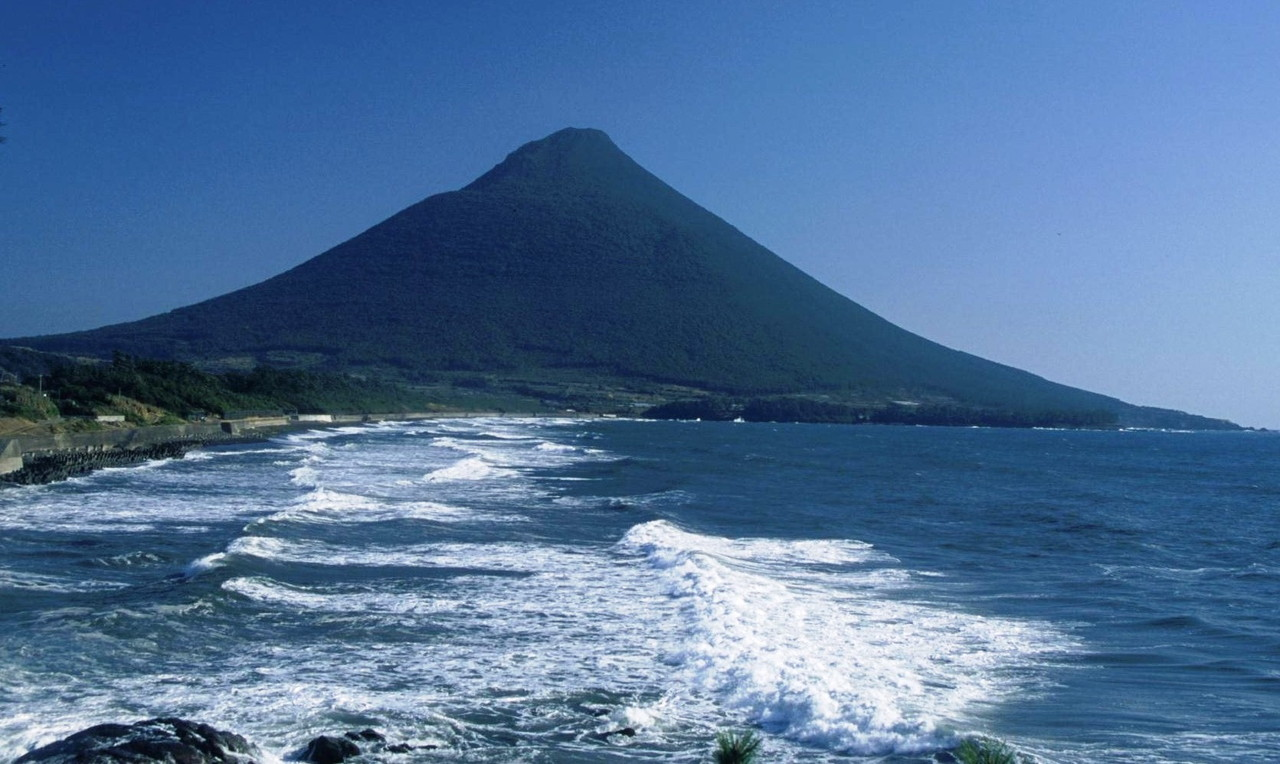
- Seen from the NNW

Highest point
- Elevation: 924 m (3,031 ft)
- Coordinates: 31°10′48″N 130°31′42″E

Geography
- Location within Japan
- Mount Kaimon and other selected volcanic features of the Ibusuki volcanic field.
- Location: Kyūshū, Japan

Geology
- Mountain type: stratovolcano
- Last eruption: 885 CE

Kaimondake (開聞岳, Kaimon-dake), or Mount Kaimon, is an undissected (Note: An undissected volcano is one that is still relatively young, whether active or extinct, and still retains its shape and layering where its original deposited cone has not yet been dissected by any major erosion processes. In a dissected volcano, these deposition layers are cut through and exposed.) volcano – consisting of a basal stratovolcano and a small complex central lava dome – which rises to a height of 924 metres above sea level near the city of Ibusuki in southern Kyūshū, Japan. The last eruption occurred in the year 885 CE. Because of its conic shape, Mt. Kaimon is sometimes referred to as "the Fuji of Satsuma". It is one of the 100 Famous Japanese Mountains.

== Geography ==
Mt. Kaimon is located in the south of Kagoshima prefecture, Kyushu and is an important reference point for marine traffic because it is the southernmost prominence of the Satsuma Peninsula. This is one entrance marker to Kinko Bay (Kagoshima Bay) complimentary to the Ōsumi Peninsula. Together with Mt. Noma and Mt. Kinpo, it is used by marine traffic.

=== Geology ===
Part of the Ibusuki volcanic field, Mt. Kaimon defines the eastern margin of the old Ata Caldera. The total eruptive volume of tephra has been 3.1 km^{3} (0.74 cu mi) and 2.3 km^{3} (0.55 cu mi) of lava.

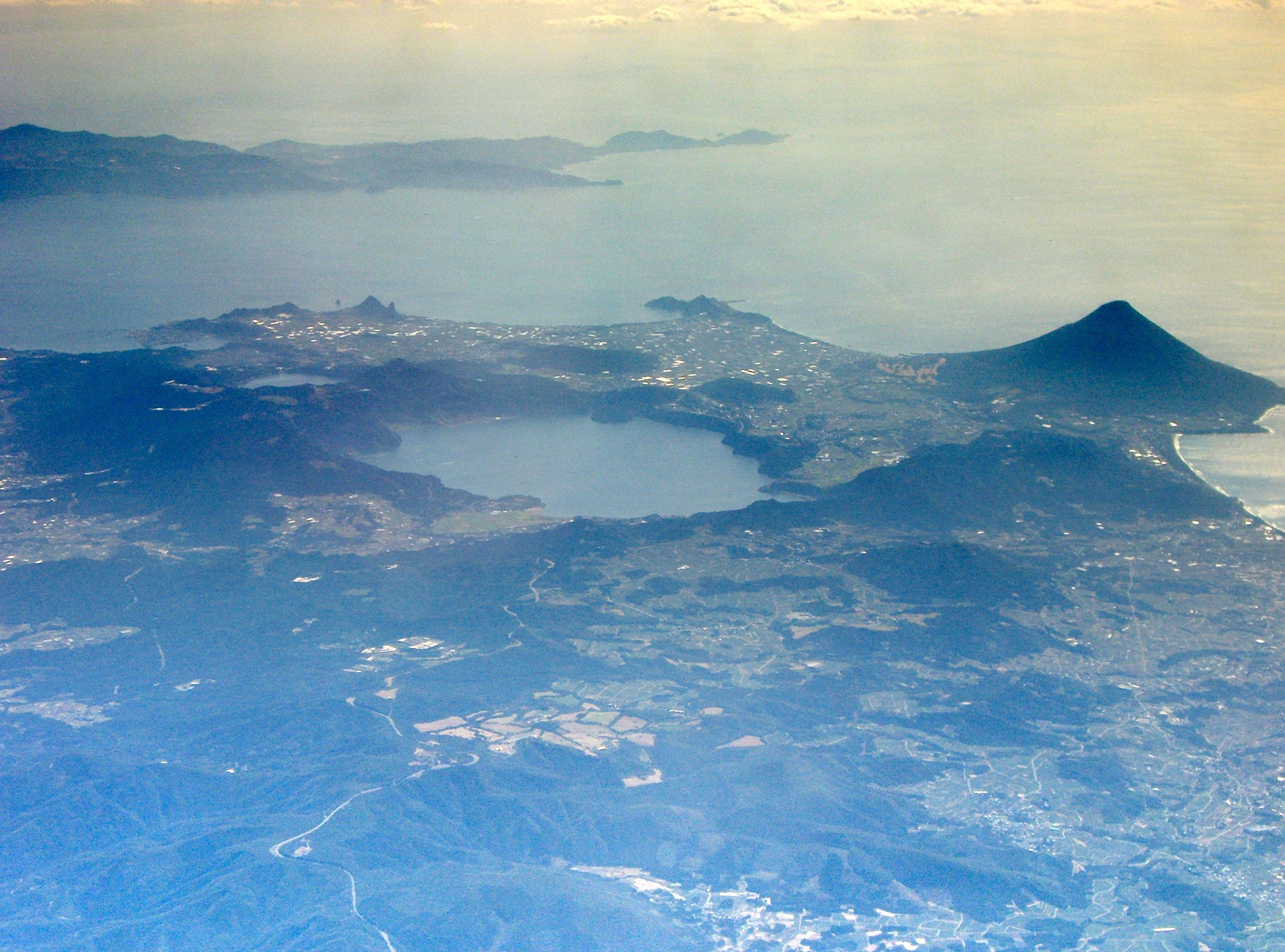
Lake Ikeda (centre left) and Mount Kaimon (right)

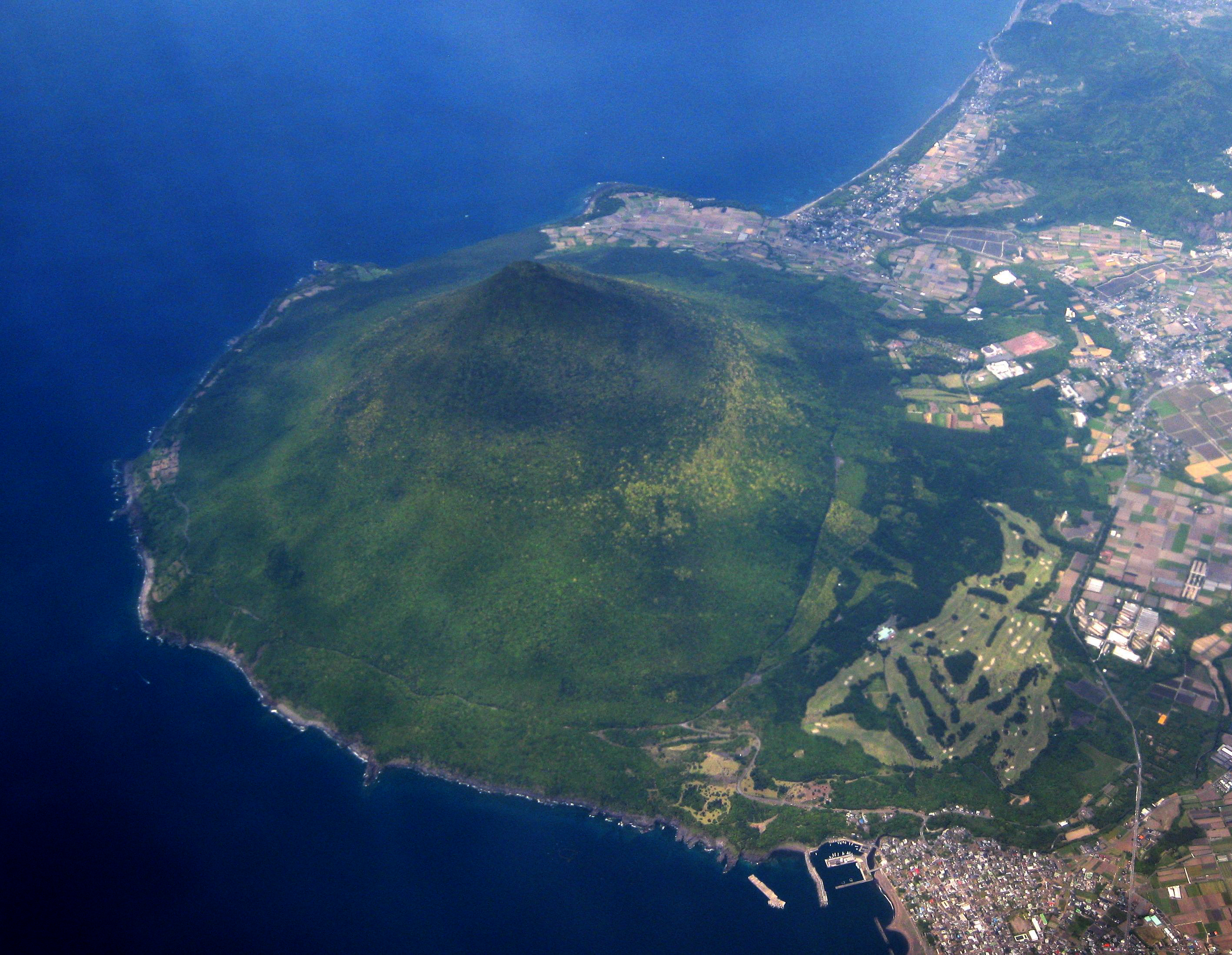
An aerial photograph of Kaimondake

There is a sea scarp which is 7.8 km wide and 9.3 km long, the shape is similar to a horseshoe in the seabed at the southern foot of the mountain. There is a lot of sediment at the foot of the mountain due to submarine landslides. It was found that there is a sea scarp underground on the south side of the mountain and it was caused by pressure from a submarine landslide before Mt. Kaimon was formed.

The sedimentary layer of ejecta from the eruption at the end of the 7th century is called ao-kora (ao means blue and kora is soil consisting of volcanic ash found in the southern part of the Satsuma Peninsula). The sedimentary layer of ejecta by the eruption at the end of the 7th century is called murasaki-kora (Murasaki means purple). These layers are a clue to know the changes in life in this era. It has become clear that a village was isolated by a large eruption with change in life style in the latter part of the 9th century.

=== Eruptive history ===
Mount Kaimon began volcanic activity about 4,000 years ago. From 3,000 years up to 885 years ago, large eruptions occurred 9 times and eruptions resulting in large amounts of lava occurred 10 times making twelve major eruptions to date.

The two large eruptions in the historic written record of “Nihon Sandai Jitsuroku” are in 874 CE (Jogan era) and 885 CE (Nin-na era) The complex layered central dome consists of a scoria cone topped by lava flows and ultimately a lava dome which was penetrated by a plug. However the explosion crater at the top was last enlarged by the 885 CE eruption.

Eruptive history Mount Kaimon (dates approximate before 874 CE)
Date	DRE	Tephra	Lava	Comment
885 CE	0.129 km^{3} (0.031 cu mi)	0.293 km^{3} (0.070 cu mi)	0.007 km^{3} (0.0017 cu mi)	Km-Nn tephra pyroclastic flow to the east. Recorded in “Nihon Sandai Jitsuroku”.
874 CE	0.109 km^{3} (0.026 cu mi)	0.237 km^{3} (0.057 cu mi)	–	Km-Jo tephra. Recorded in “Nihon Sandai Jitsuroku”.
500 CE	0.096 km^{3} (0.023 cu mi)	0.260 km^{3} (0.062 cu mi)	0.19 km^{3} (0.046 cu mi)	Km-11
200 CE	0.02 km^{3} (0.0048 cu mi)	0.041 km^{3} (0.0098 cu mi)	–	Km-10
0 CE	0.368 km^{3} (0.088 cu mi)	0.835 km^{3} (0.200 cu mi)	–	Km-9
– 100 BCE	0.102 km^{3} (0.024 cu mi)	0.220 km^{3} (0.053 cu mi)	0.01 km^{3} (0.0024 cu mi)	Km-8
– 300 BCE	0.097 km^{3} (0.023 cu mi)	0.255 km^{3} (0.061 cu mi)	0.015 km^{3} (0.0036 cu mi)	Km-7
– 500 BCE	0.039 km^{3} (0.0094 cu mi)	0.097 km^{3} (0.023 cu mi)	–	Km-6
– 900 BCE	0.004 km^{3} (0.00096 cu mi)	0.009 km^{3} (0.0022 cu mi)	0.65 km^{3} (0.16 cu mi)	Km-5 under sea lava flows
– 1200 BCE	0.128 km^{3} (0.031 cu mi)	0.266 km^{3} (0.064 cu mi)	–	Km-4 large tephra fall to north west
– 1400 BCE	0.002 km^{3} (0.00048 cu mi)	0.004 km^{3} (0.00096 cu mi)	–	Km-3
– 1600 BCE	0.002 km^{3} (0.00048 cu mi)	0.004 km^{3} (0.00096 cu mi)	–	Km-2
– 2000 BCE	0.274 km^{3} (0.066 cu mi)	0.57 km^{3} (0.14 cu mi)	1.339 km^{3} (0.321 cu mi)	Km-1

=== Transition of height ===
In 1895, the official height of Mt. Kaimon was 922.23 m (3,025.7 ft) from a second triangulation point which was at the summit of the mountain, but this was updated to 924 m (3,031 ft) by the Geospatial Information Authority of Japan in July 2001, because climbers pointed out that the height of the rocks on the top of the mountain were higher than the triangulation point.

== Climbing ==
The spiral-shaped hiking trail climb of Mt. Kaimon takes about 3 hours. Mt. Kaimon is considerably lower than most of the mountains on the 100 famous Japanese Mountains list but as climbing starts from close to sea level there is an ascent of 900 metres (3,000 ft). Mt. Kaimon is a single peak but with summit rocky outcrops that allow views on all sides, such as Lake Ikeda to the north and the Pacific Ocean to the south.

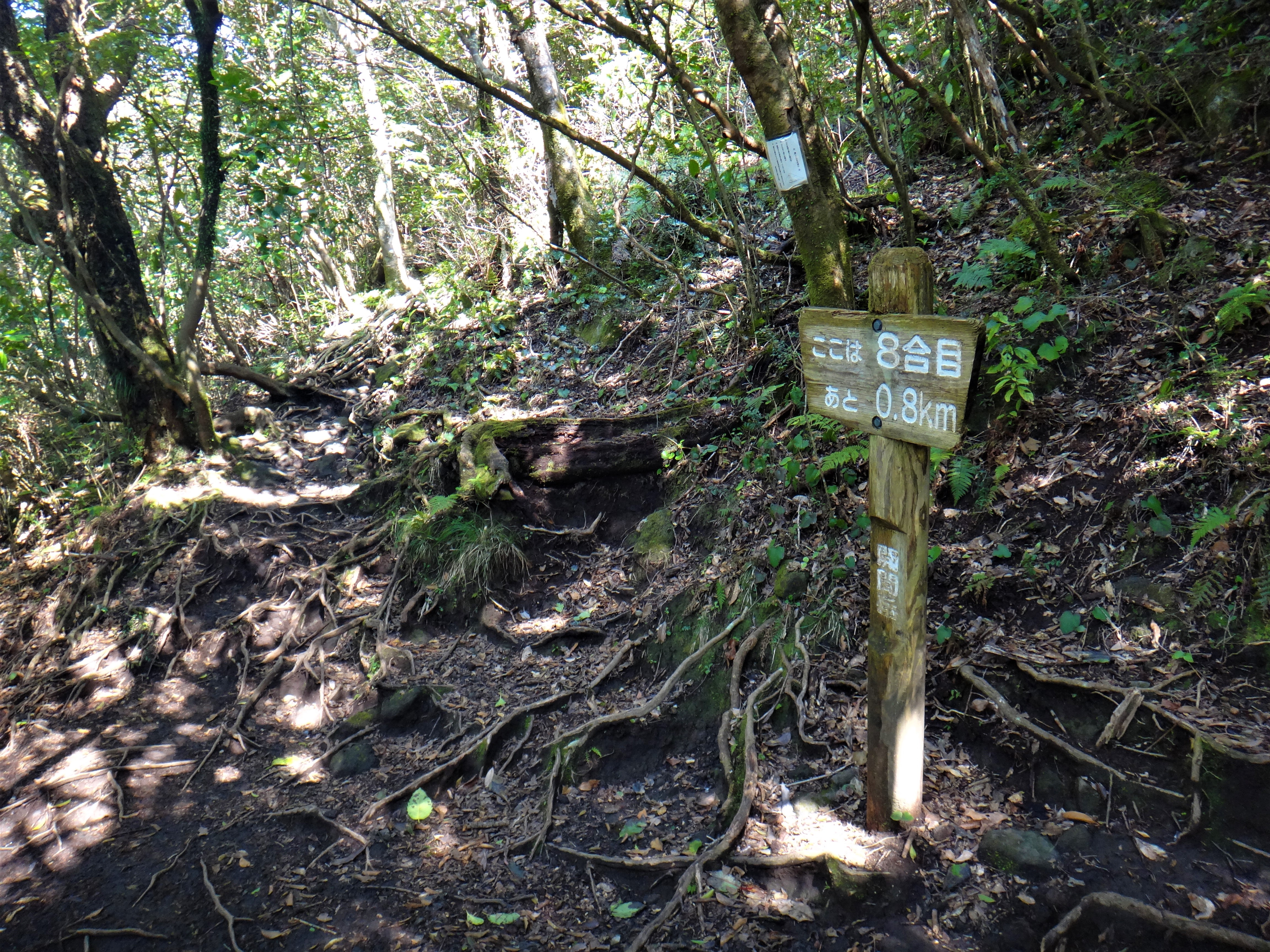
The eighth station of Mt. Kaimon ("station" is unit of itinerary of climbing from the base to the top. Regardless mountain height, all itineraries are divided into 10.)

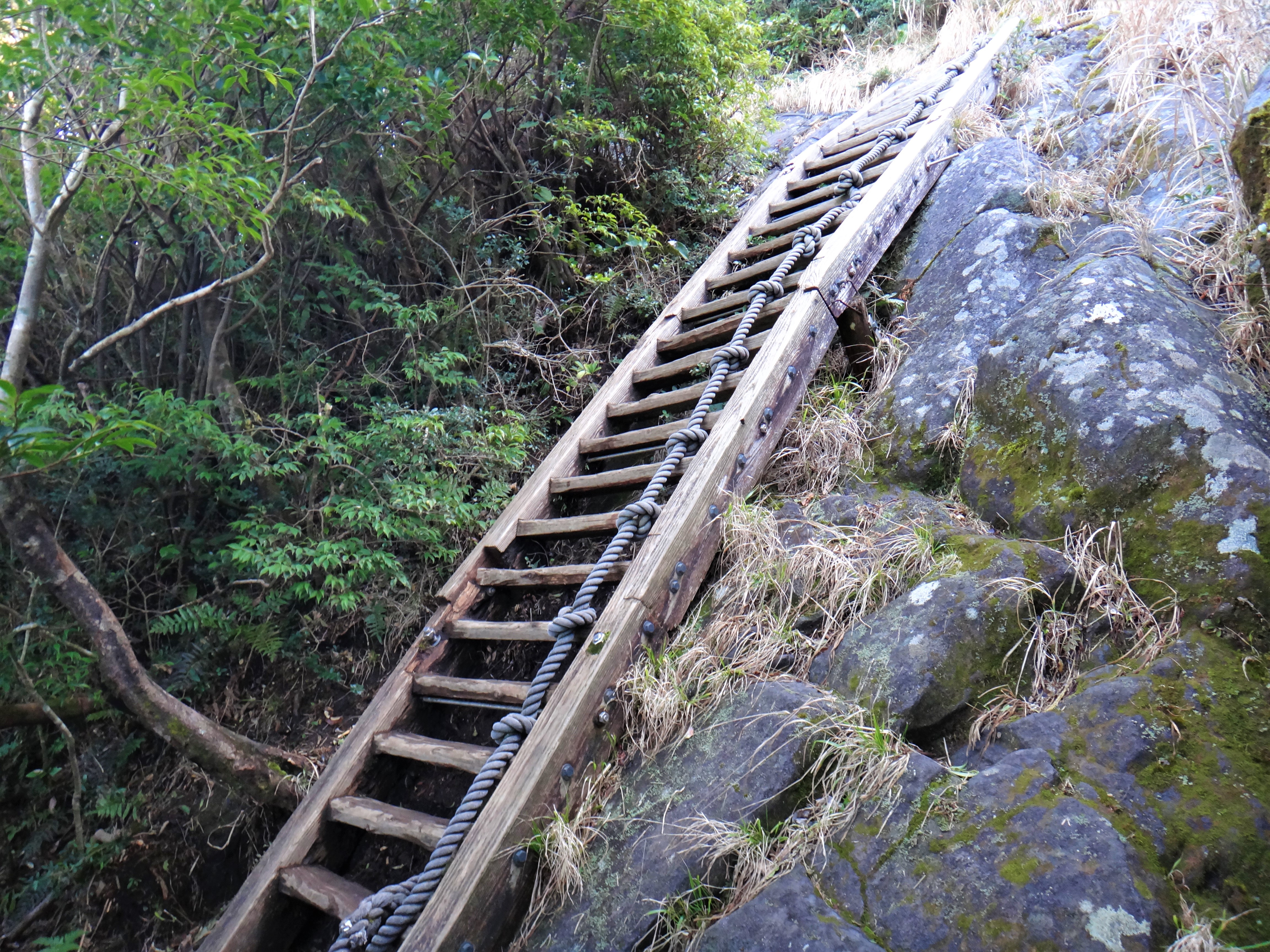
Ladder directly beneath the summit

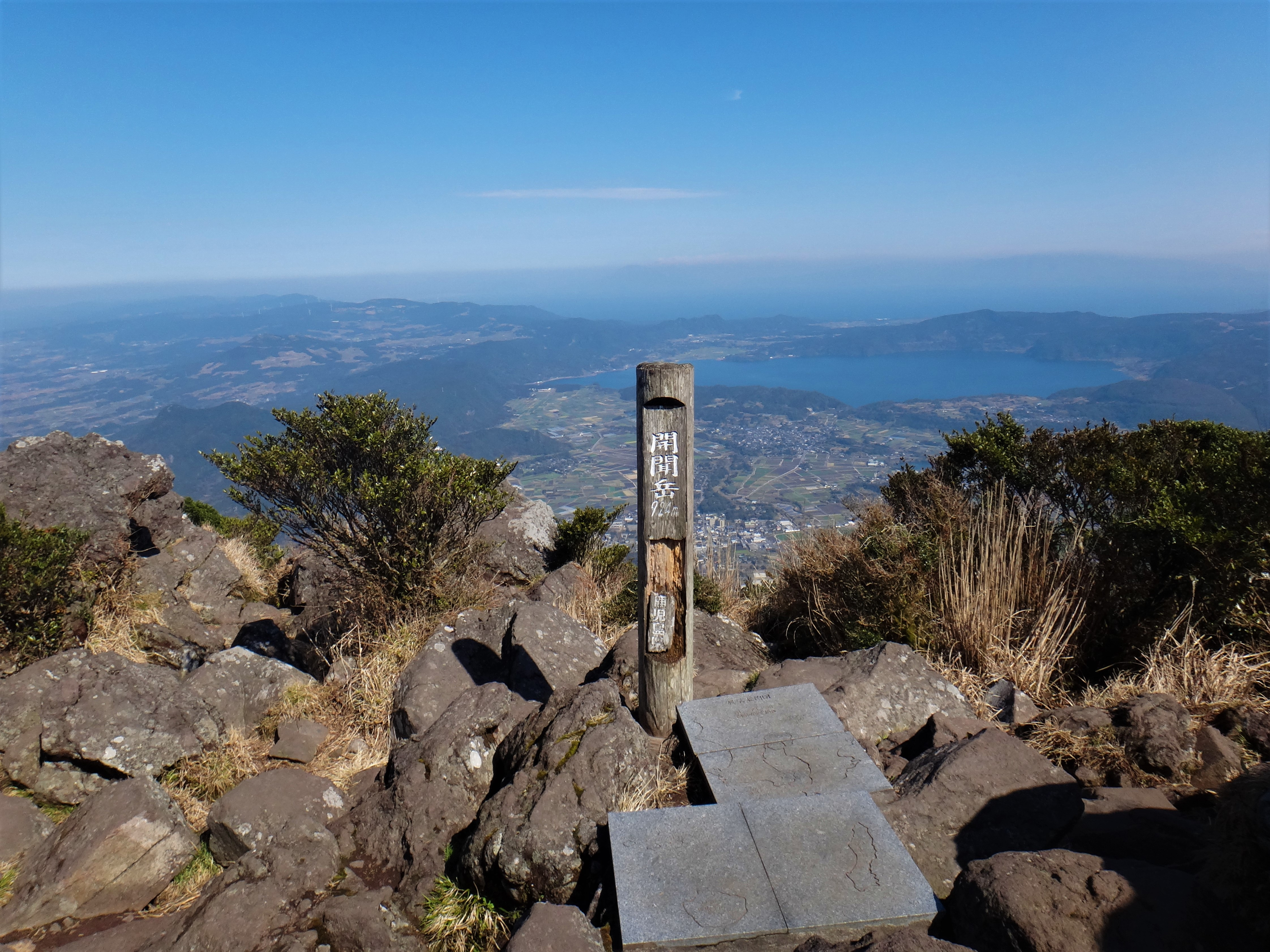
The summit of Mt. Kaimon with Lake Ikeda in the background

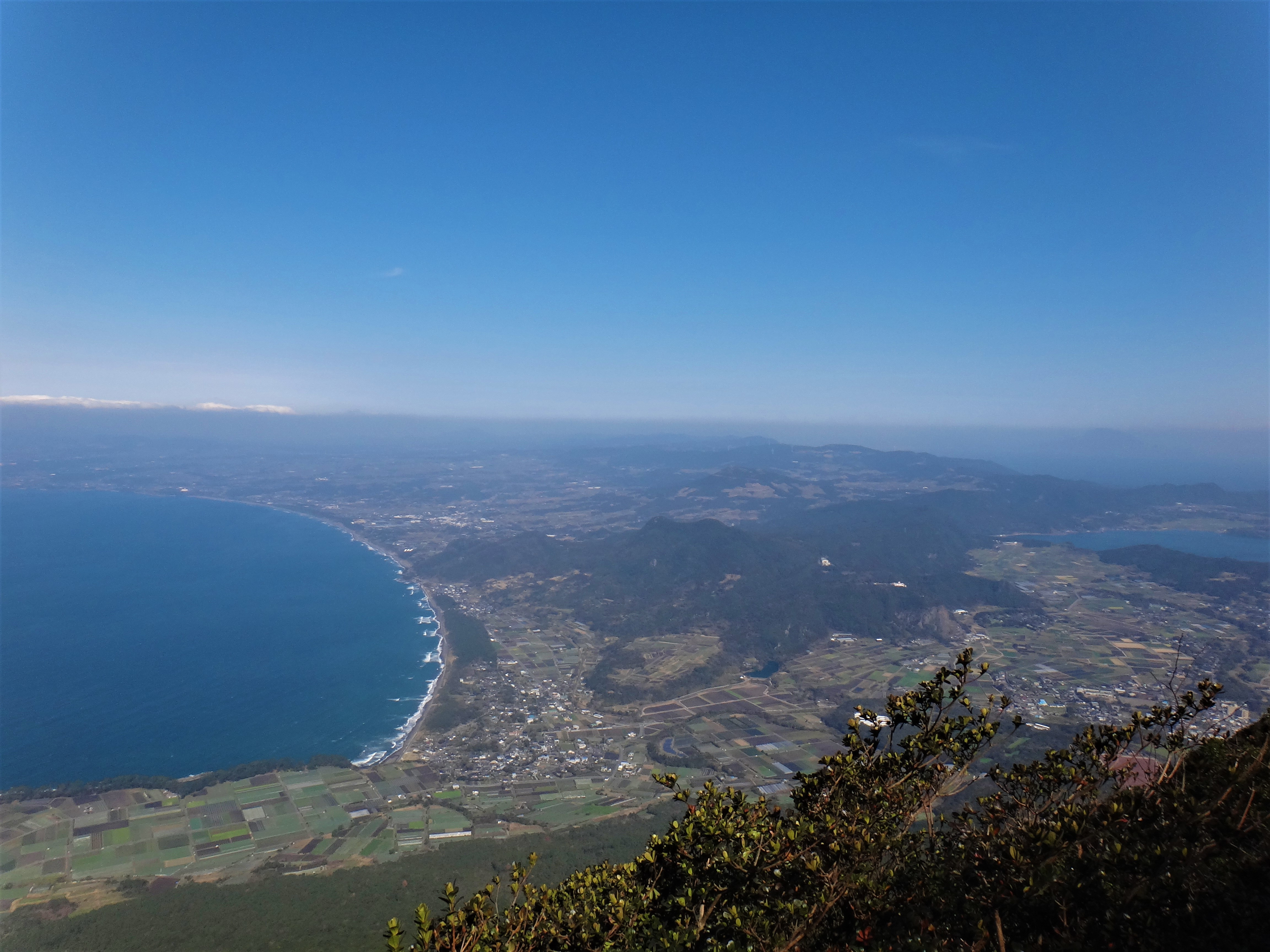
Maehara coast and Lake Ikeda from the summit

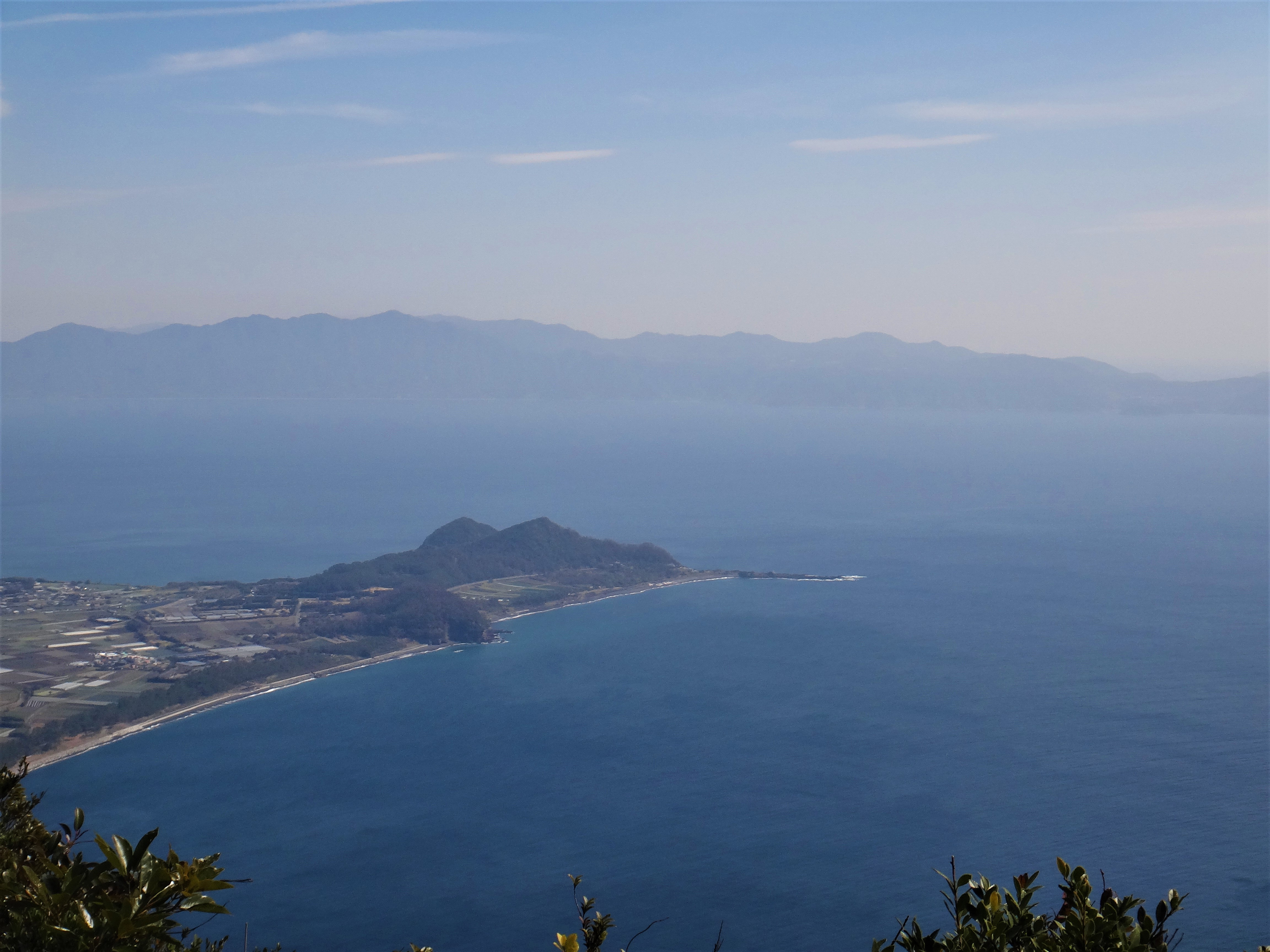
Nagasakibana from the summit

== Tourism ==
- Kaimon Sanroku Nature Park – The Tokara horse is breed at the base of the mountain.
- Kaimon Sanroku Fureai Park – There are log houses as well as camp sites.
- Hirasaki Shrine
- Lake Ikeda – It is said that a mystery creature "Issie" lives there. The rape mustard flowering in January is very attractive.
- Bohi Park – Memorial to those killed in the Pacific War in the Philippines.

== See also ==
- List of volcanoes in Japan
