= Ōsumi Peninsula =

Peninsula in Kagoshima Prefecture, Japan

Coordinates: 30°59′39″N 130°39′39″E

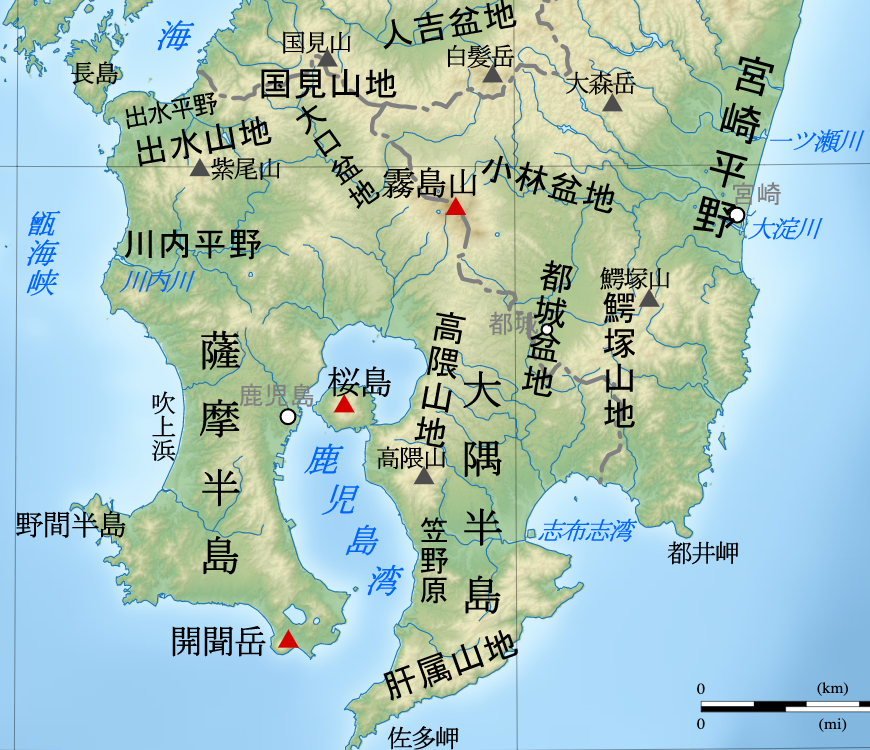
Topographic map of Kagoshima prefecture

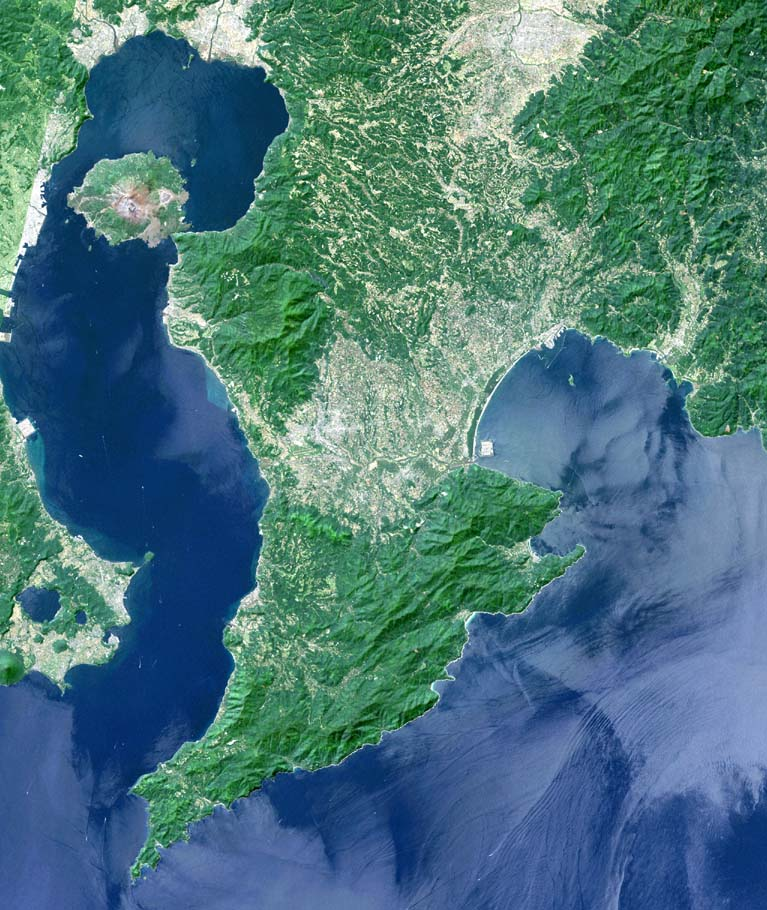
Satellite image of Ōsumi Peninsula

The Ōsumi Peninsula (大隅半島, Ōsumi Hantō (Note: Japanese pronunciation: [ó̞ò̞.sɨ̀.mʲì, ò̞ó̞.sɨ́.mʲí (hä́ǹ.tò̞ò̞), ó̞ó̞.sɨ́.mʲí (hä́ǹ.tò̞ò̞)])) projects south from the Japanese island of Kyūshū and includes the southernmost point on the island, Cape Sata. Its east coast lies on the Pacific Ocean, while to the west it faces the Satsuma Peninsula across Kagoshima Bay. Politically it is part of Kagoshima Prefecture. Lava erupted in 1914 by Sakurajima (previously an island) made a land connection with the northwest of the Ōsumi Peninsula.

Japan's first satellite was named Ohsumi in honour of the people living in the area due their support of the people working on the launch.

== See also ==
- Satamisaki (佐多岬): Southernmost point
