= Satsuma Peninsula =

Peninsula in Kagoshima Prefecture, Japan

Satsuma Peninsula 薩摩半島 (Satsuma-hantō)
- Peninsula
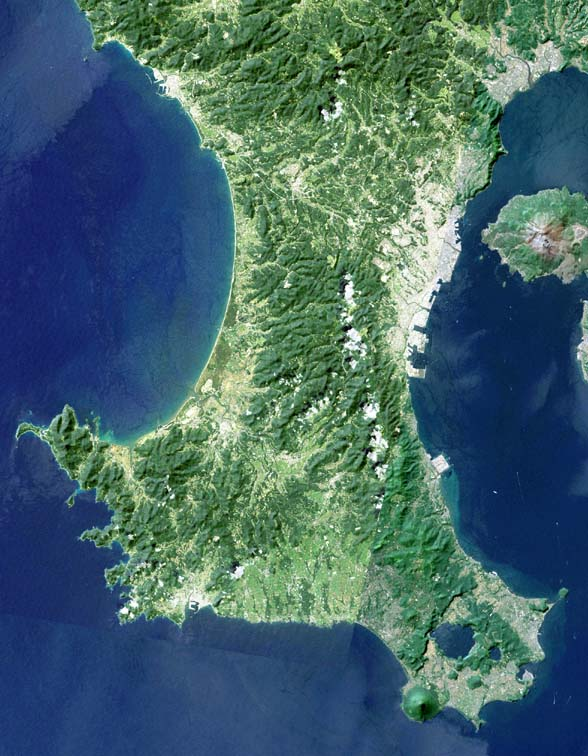
- Landsat image

- Coordinates: 31°09′19″N 130°35′13″E
- Location: Kyūshū Island, Japan
- Offshore water bodies: East China Sea

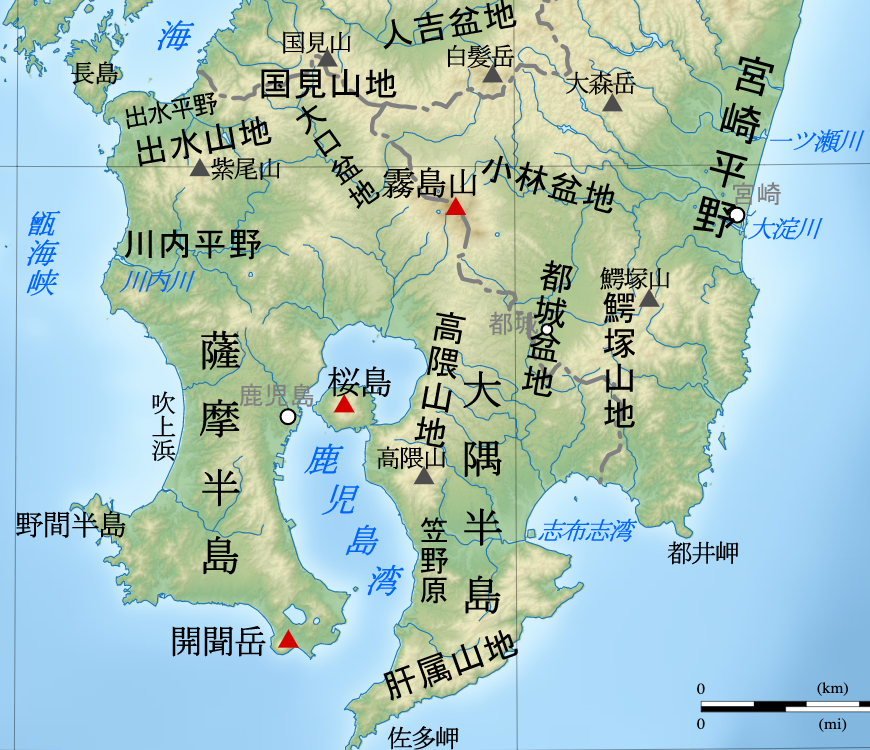
Topographic map of Kagoshima prefecture

The Satsuma Peninsula (薩摩半島 Satsuma-hantō) is a peninsula which projects south from the southwest part of Kyūshū Island, Japan. To the west lies the East China Sea, while to the east it faces the Ōsumi Peninsula across Kagoshima Bay. Politically, it belongs to Kagoshima Prefecture, and it includes the prefectural capital, Kagoshima City. Near the southern tip of the peninsula is the 924 metres (3,031 ft) Mount Kaimon (Kaimon-dake) and the hot springs of Ibusuki Onsen.
