= Kagoshima Bay =

Inlet in Kyūshū, Japan

Coordinates: 31°28′11″N 130°38′08″E

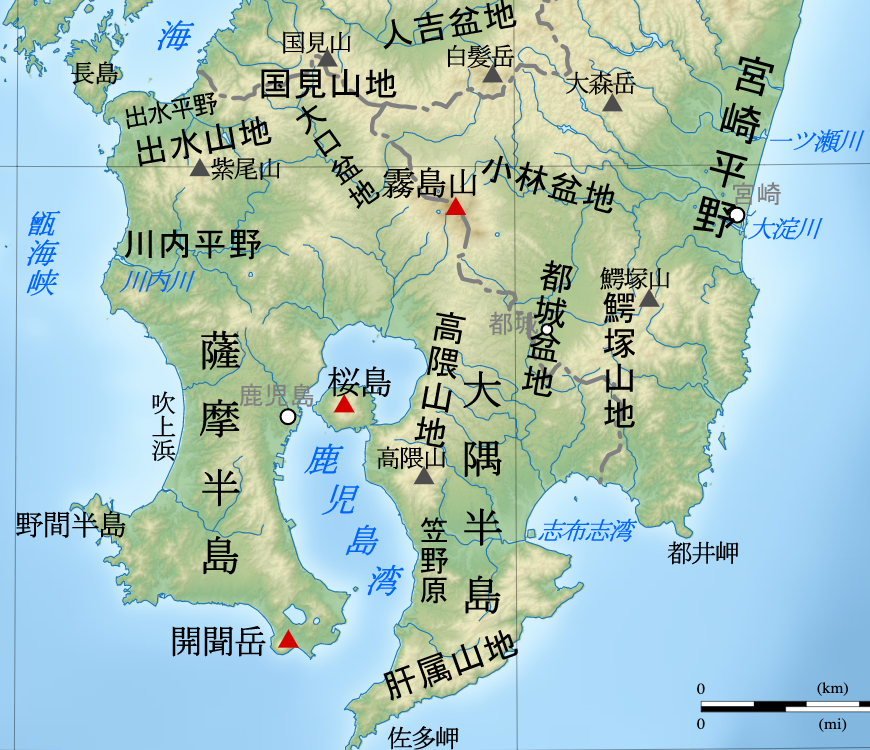
Location of Kagoshima Bay

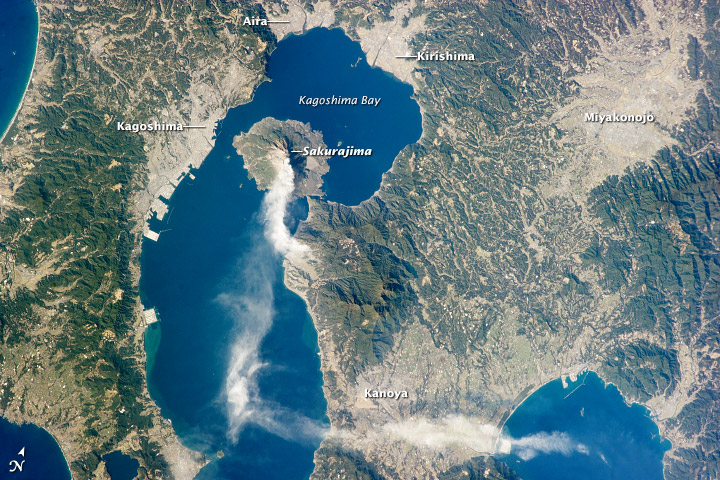
Kagoshima Bay as seen from the International Space Station on January 10, 2013

Kagoshima Bay (鹿児島湾, Kagoshima-wan) also known as Kinkō Bay, Kinko Bay (錦江湾, Kinko-wan) is a deep inlet of the East China Sea on the coast of Japan.

Kagoshima Bay is on the south coast of the island of Kyūshū. The port city of Kagoshima and its well-protected harbor lie on the bay's western coast, just opposite the former island (now peninsula) of Sakurajima.

== Geology ==
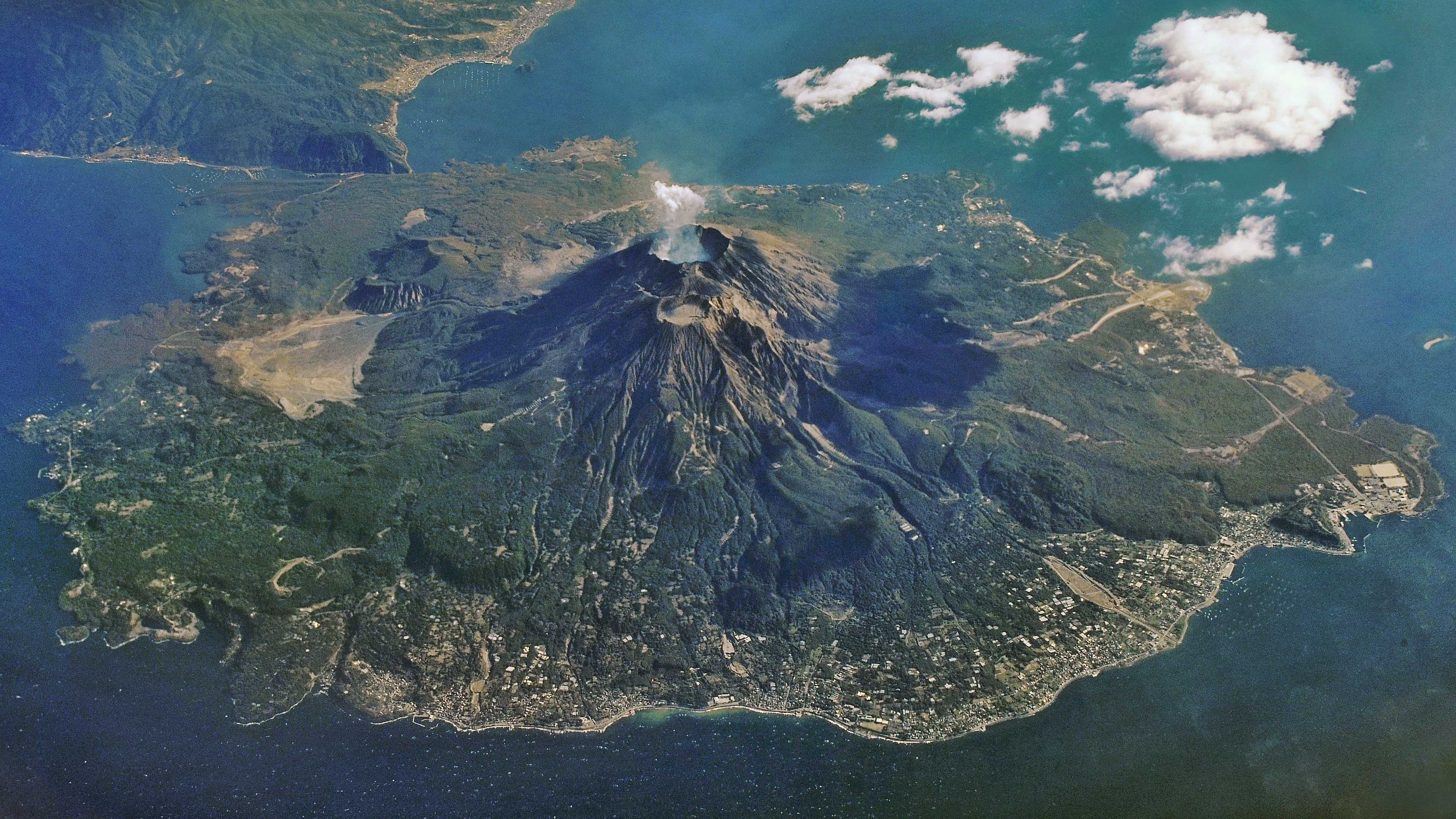
Aerial view of Sakurajima from the north

The bay itself is partially volcanic in origin, with two massive submarine calderas shaping part of the bay's shoreline: The younger Aira Caldera in the northernmost part of the bay, and the older Ata Caldera at the mouth of the bay where it meets the East China Sea. Both calderas formed during the Pleistocene from highly explosive Ultra-Plinian volcanic eruptions, Aira approximately 22,000 years ago and Ata approximately 105,000 years ago. Though such enormous eruptions are extremely infrequent, both volcanoes have remained active with much smaller eruptions in historic times, with Sakurajima in the bay and the Kirishima Mountains north of the bay forming active vents associated with the Aira volcano magma sources, and the smaller 4000-year-old Ikeda Caldera with Mount Kaimon at the southern end of the Satsuma Peninsula forming dormant vents of the Ata volcano. In the inner north of the bay the area of the Wakamiko Caldera within the Aira Caldera erupts volcanic gas which when it reaches the surface of the sea is called Tagiri (which means 'to boil' in Japanese). Hydrothermal vents including volcanic chimneys with rare mineral deposition exist on the bay's sea bottom.

== History ==
The massive Akahoya eruption to the south around 7,300 cal. BP depopulated the bay by pyroclastic flow, tsunami and ash during the earliest stage of the Jōmon period.

Before written records the area was likely repopulated by the Jōmon and then it is likely they were replaced by the Kumaso whose culture was completely suppressed by the 7th century.

Tribes of the Hayato people were long established by the 7th century on either peninsula and had submitted and supported imperial rule as servants to the emperor, although the 720 to 721 CE Hayato Rebellion of the Ōsumi Hayato is an exception. Yamato immigrants only became dominant when the Hayato were made to emigrate to the Kinai region after the end of the 7th century.

Francis Xavier's party of Jesuits, having been first refused the right to land in Japan first went ashore in Kagoshima on 15 August 1549.

From 1602 to 1871 it was part of the Satsuma Domain.

The Bombardment of Kagoshima by British warships in the bay took place in 1863.

The 1914 eruption of the Sakurajima volcano severely damaged Kagoshima.

On June 17, 1945, Kagoshima was attacked by B-29 bombers with 2316 persons killed.

== Biology ==
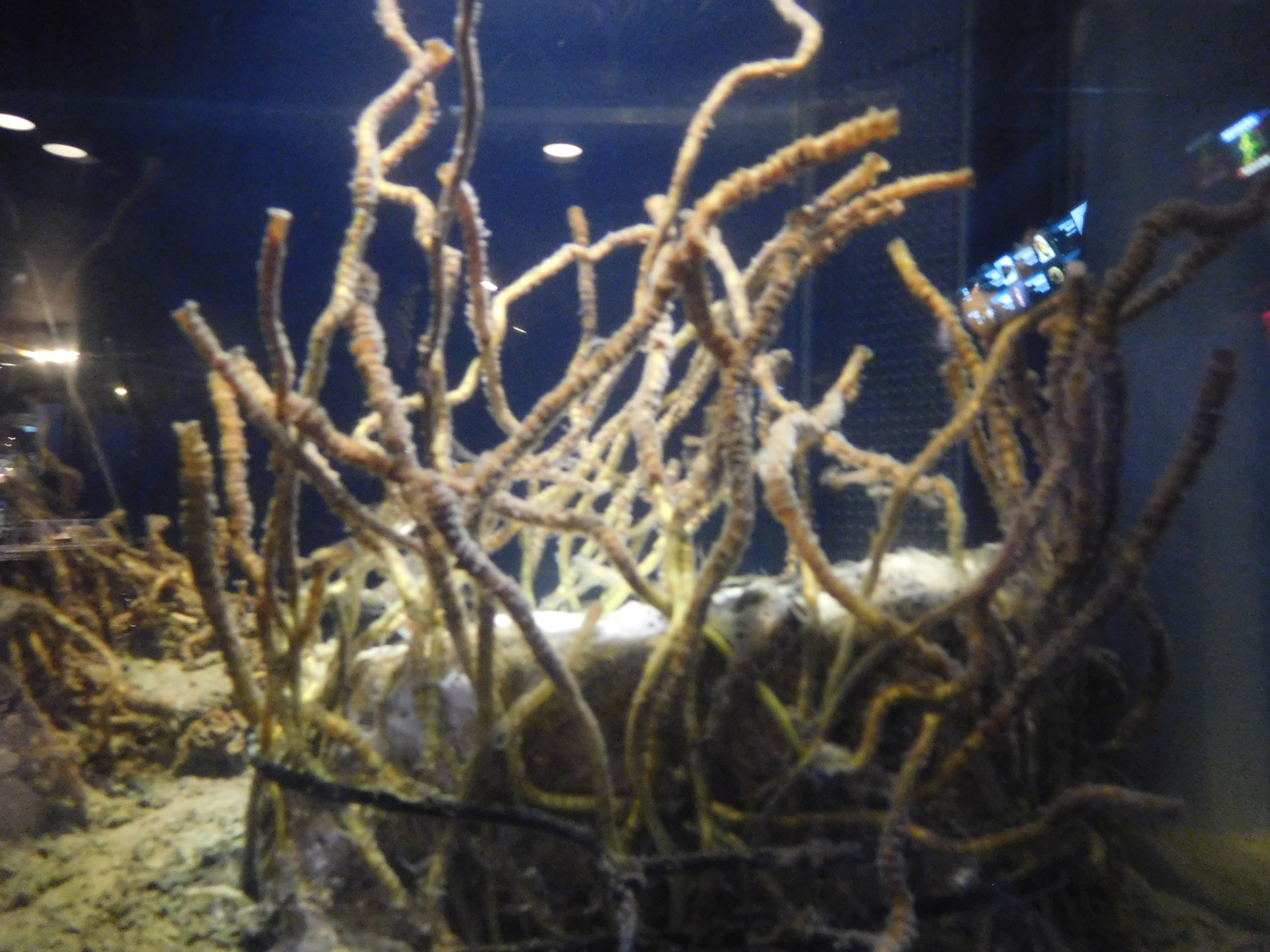
Satsuma Tubeworm (Satsuma-Haorimushi, Lamellibrachia satsuma at Enoshima Aquarium.

The recurrent and continuing volcanic activity contributes to the diversity of wildlife on its shores and within its waters. On its shores are rare flora and fauna, including Japanese bay tree and Japanese black pine such as at Arimura beach. The mangrove is found at the far northern limit of its northern hemisphere distribution. In the Sakurajima Channel, eel grass grows atypically to 2 m (6 ft 7 in) high. Octocorallia coral is found in the deeper southern portions of the bay. A very rare Lamellibrachia tube worm Lamellibrachia satsuma is found in the bay at a very shallow depth for the genus of only 82 m (269 ft). There are many fish and shellfish species and a large pod of dolphins is a tourist attraction within the bay.

== See also ==
- Kirishima-Kinkowan National Park

== Notes ==
- Merriam Webster's Geographical Dictionary, Third Edition. Springfield, Massachusetts: Merriam-Webster, Incorporated, 1997. ISBN 0-87779-546-0.
