= Special =

Special or Specials may refer to:

== Policing ==
- Officer of the Ulster Special Constabulary, Northern Ireland (1920–1970)
- Special Constable, an auxiliary, volunteer or part-time officer
- Special police forces

== Arts and entertainment ==
=== Film ===
- Special (film), a 2006 sci-fi dramedy
- The Specials (2000 film), a superhero comedy
- Special 26, a 2013 Indian period heist
- The Specials (2019 film), a French drama

=== Music albums ===
- Special (Lizzo album) or the title song, 2022
- Special (Vesta Williams album) or the title song, 1991
- Special (The Temptations album), 1989
- Special (Jimmy Cliff album), 1982
- The Specials (album), by the Specials, 1979
- The Specials (Shania Twain video), 2001

=== Songs ===
- "Special" (Garbage song), 1998
- "Special" (SZA song), 2022
- "Special" (Lizzo song), 2023
- "Specialz", by King Gnu, 2023
- "Special", by 21 Savage from Issa Album, 2017
- "Special", by the Game from The Documentary, 2005
- "Special", by Gucci Mane from Delusions of Grandeur, 2019
- "Special", by Janet Jackson from The Velvet Rope, 1997
- "Special", by Lee Hi featuring Jennie from First Love, 2013
- "Special", by the Mekons from I Love Mekons, 1993
- "Special", by Mew from And the Glass Handed Kites, 2005
- "Special", by Monsta X from The Connect: Dejavu, 2018
- "Special", by New Order from Republic, 1993
- "Special", by Shifty Shellshock from Happy Love Sick, 2004
- "Special", by Six60 from Six60, 2015
- "Special", by Stephen Lynch from A Little Bit Special, 2000
- "Special", by Violent Femmes from The Blind Leading the Naked, 1986
- "Special", by Vitamin C from More, 2001
- "Special", from the musical Avenue Q

=== Television ===
- Television special, programming that temporarily replaces scheduled programming
- Special (TV series), a 2019 Netflix Original TV series
- Specials (TV series), 1991, about British Special Constables
- The Specials (TV series), an internet documentary series about 5 friends with learning disabilities
- "Special" (Lost), an episode of the television series Lost

=== Other media ===
- Special (lighting), a stage light for a one-off purpose
- Specials (novel), by Scott Westerfeld
- The Specials, a British 2 tone and ska revival band
- SPECIAL, the Fallout video game series' player stats system
- Specials, the comic book heroes; see Rising Stars (comic)

== Computing ==
- Specials (Unicode block), Unicode codepoints used for special usage
- An escape/extension mechanism in the Device independent file format (DVI)

== Military and weapons ==
- Special forces
- Special operations
- Ammunition such as the .38 Special, .41 Special, .44 Special and .500 S&W Special

== Vehicles ==
- A kit car or one-off home-built vehicle
- Adcox Special, a 1929 biplane
- Ellingston Special, a 1930s variable-geometry aircraft

== Other uses ==
- A special price, a form of discounts and allowances
- Special education, a form of education accommodating the needs of disabled students
- Special needs, the level of assistance required to accommodate individuals with disabilities

== See also ==
- Special attack (disambiguation)
- Special forces (disambiguation)
