= Lunge mine =

Japanese suicidal anti-tank weapon

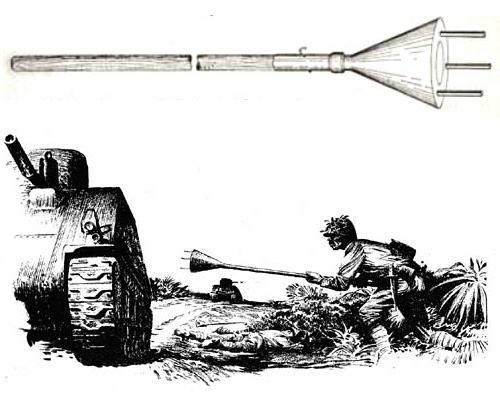
- A drawing of a lunge mine and its operation
- Type: Suicidal anti-tank mine
- Place of origin: Empire of Japan

Service history
- In service: 1944–1948
- Used by: Imperial Japanese Army; Viet Minh
- Wars: World War II; First Indochina War; Vietnam War

Production history
- Designed: World War II

Specifications
- Mass: 14.3 lb (6.5 kg) (overall)
- Length: 78 in (200 cm) (overall)
- Height: 11.6 in (29 cm) (body)
- Diameter: 8 in (20 cm) (body)
- Filling: TNT
- Filling weight: 6.6 lb (3.0 kg)
- Detonation mechanism: Blasting cap

The Shitotsubakurai (Japanese: 刺突爆雷 lit. "Thrusting Depth Charge") or lunge mine was a suicidal anti-tank weapon developed and used by the Empire of Japan during World War II. It used a high-explosive anti-tank charge. It was used by the close-quarters battle units of the Imperial Japanese Army. The weapon was a conical hollow charge anti-tank mine, placed inside a metallic container and attached to the end of a wooden stick. The weapon was officially adopted by the Japanese Army in 1944, with the first noted combat use in Leyte in December 1944. During 1945, it caused additional victims in the Asiatic-Pacific Theater, where it commonly saw action against American armour. Later that year, some Japanese Imperial Army manuals of the weapon were discovered by US troops.

== Design ==
The lunge mine consisted of a conical hollow charge attached to one end of a wooden stick used to hold it during its transport and use. The mine had three equally spaced legs facing forward around the conical explosive base. The detonator was situated at the end of the conical base. The handle was connected to the mine body with a length of tubing through which it could slide once the safety pin was removed and the copper shear wire broken by impact with the target, at which point the steel striker at its end would be driven into the detonator.

The conical mine body was 11.6 inches (29 cm) long and 8 inches (20 cm) in diameter at its base, weighing 11 pounds (5.0 kg), including the 6.6 pounds (3.0 kg) of crude TNT filling. The three metal legs welded to it were 6 inches (15 cm) long, intended to ensure the proper stand-off distance for the shaped charge to achieve maximum penetration. The 1.25-inch (3.2 cm) diameter handle was 59 inches (150 cm) long and weighed 3.3 pounds (1.5 kg), for an overall length of 78 inches (200 cm) including the three legs and weight of 14.3 pounds (6.5 kg).

=== Operation ===
To use a lunge mine, a soldier would remove the security pin, run towards the enemy armoured vehicle as if making a bayonet charge, and thrust the top of the mine against the target. The weapon needed to be held by the center with the left hand and by the bottom with the other hand. When the legs of the mine hit the objective, the handle was pushed forward, cutting a pin and making the striker move forward to the detonator. This would set off the mine, blowing up its user and, presumably, the targeted enemy armour.

=== Armour penetration ===
The mine was capable of penetrating about 6 inches (150 mm) of RHA at an angle of 90 degrees, and up to 4 inches (100 mm) at an angle of 60 degrees. However, the mine would almost always impact at 90 degrees in the event of a successful attack, thanks to the fine control of the impact angle afforded by direct, manual handling of the weapon.

== Combat record ==
The lunge mine was used by the Imperial Japanese Army during the later stages of World War II in the Asiatic-Pacific Theater against American armour. The Intelligence Bulletin reported in March 1945 that United States forces met the weapon for the first time in Leyte Island, The Philippines, during the 1944 invasion. It also reported that "to date all attempts by the enemy to use the Lunge Mine against our tanks have met with failure" and rates it as "perhaps the oddest of these antitank charges."

In Vietnam, the lunge mine became an icon of the First Indochina War, specifically the Battle of Hanoi, during which a platoon leader named Nguyen Van Thieng tried to use it; however, the bomb failed to explode. In the end, Van Thieng was killed in action.

== See also ==
- Fire lance
- Kamikaze
- Banzai charge
- Smertnik
- Fukuryu

== Gallery ==
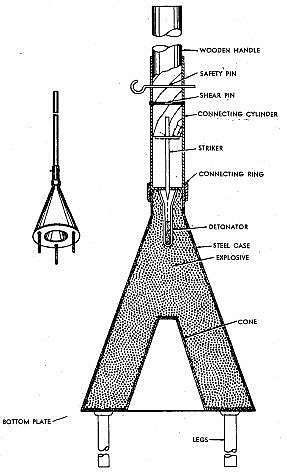
Schematic of the mines components.

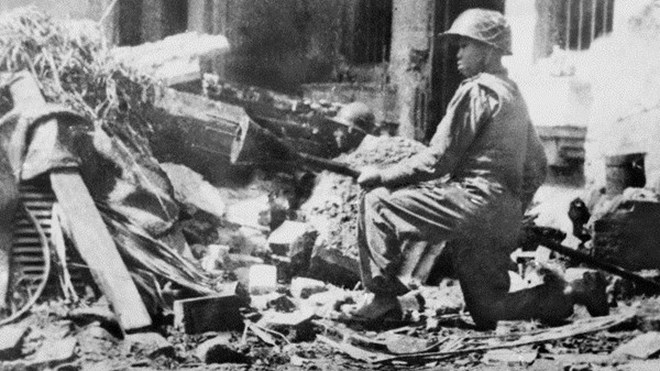
Viet Minh soldier Nguyen Van Thieng holding a lunge mine at Hàng Đậu Street in December 1946.

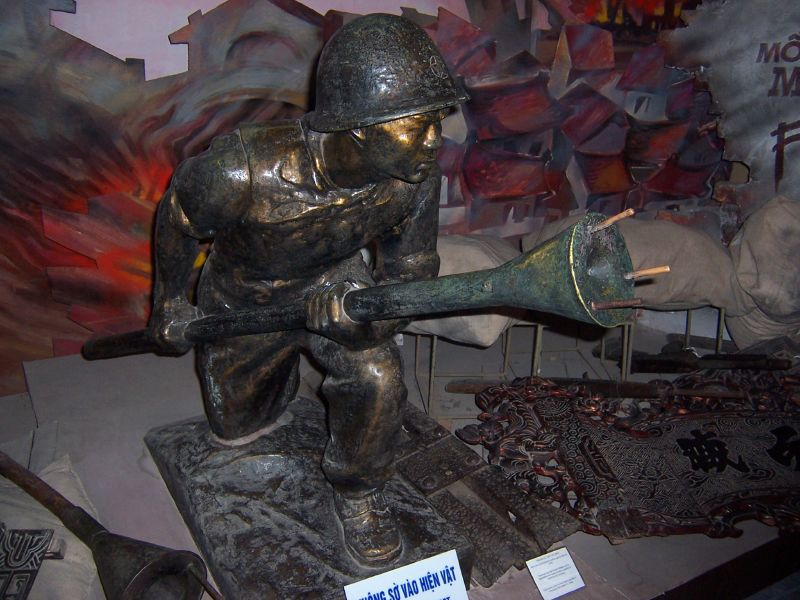
Statue of an anti-tank lunge mine being used by Nguyen Van Thieng in 1946. Military History Museum, Hanoi, Vietnam.
