= Fukuryu =

Japanese divers intended to manually detonate mines on invading ships

Coordinates: 35°06′N 139°43′E

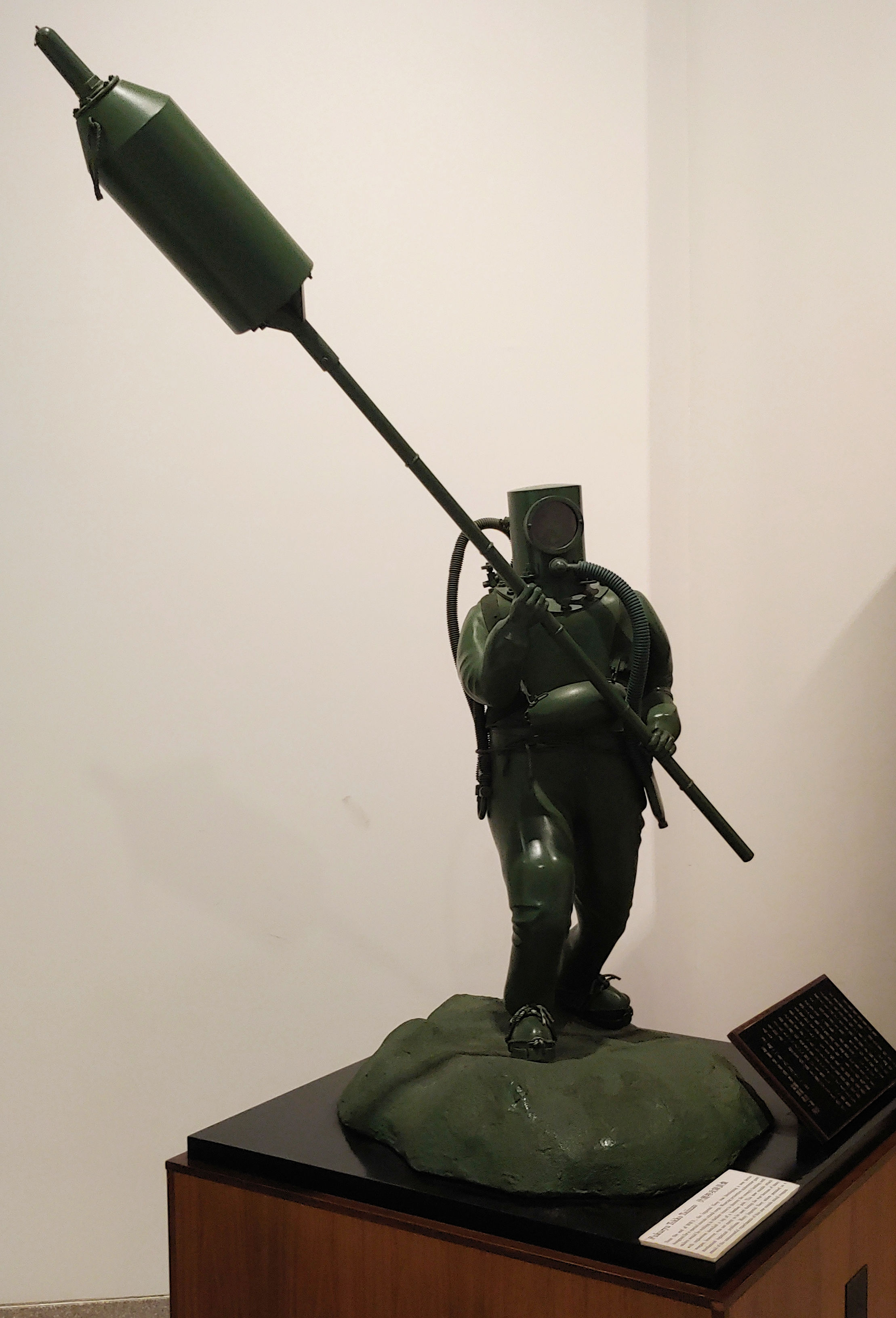
Statue of Fukuryu Diver wielding explosive mine weapon

Fukuryu (Japanese: 伏龍, Hepburn: Fukuryū) (also known as suicide divers and kamikaze frogmen) were a part of the Japanese Special Attack Units prepared to resist the invasion of Japan's Home islands by Allied forces. Six thousand men were planned to be trained and equipped with diving equipment for the role. They would use attack mines affixed to bamboo poles. Plans also included reinforced concrete stations to protect men from the explosions. Only twelve hundred men had been trained when Japan surrendered before the invasion of the Japanese mainland occurred.

== Description ==
Fukuryu were a part of the Japanese Special Attack Units during World War II. They were prepared to resist the invasion of Japan's Home islands by Allied forces.

The name literally means "crouching dragon". The men have also been called "suicide divers" or "kamikaze frogmen" in English texts.

== Personnel ==
Six thousand men were to be trained and equipped with self-contained diving gear including a diving jacket and trousers, diving shoes, and a diving helmet fixed by four bolts. They would be weighed down with 9 kg (20 lb) of lead and be sustained by liquid food and an air purification system with two 3.5-liter bottles of oxygen at 150 bar (2,200 psi). They were expected to be able to walk at a depth of 5–7 m (16–23 ft), for a period of up to ten hours.

Personnel were organized into six-man squads with five squads to a platoon, five platoons plus a maintenance platoon to a company, and three companies to a battalion of approximately 540 men. The 71st Arashi was headquartered at Yokosuka with two trained battalions and four battalions in training. The 81st Arashi at Kure was planned for 1000 men to be trained by 250 men from Yokosuka. A similar 1000-man Kawatana unit was planned for Sasebo.

== Weapon ==
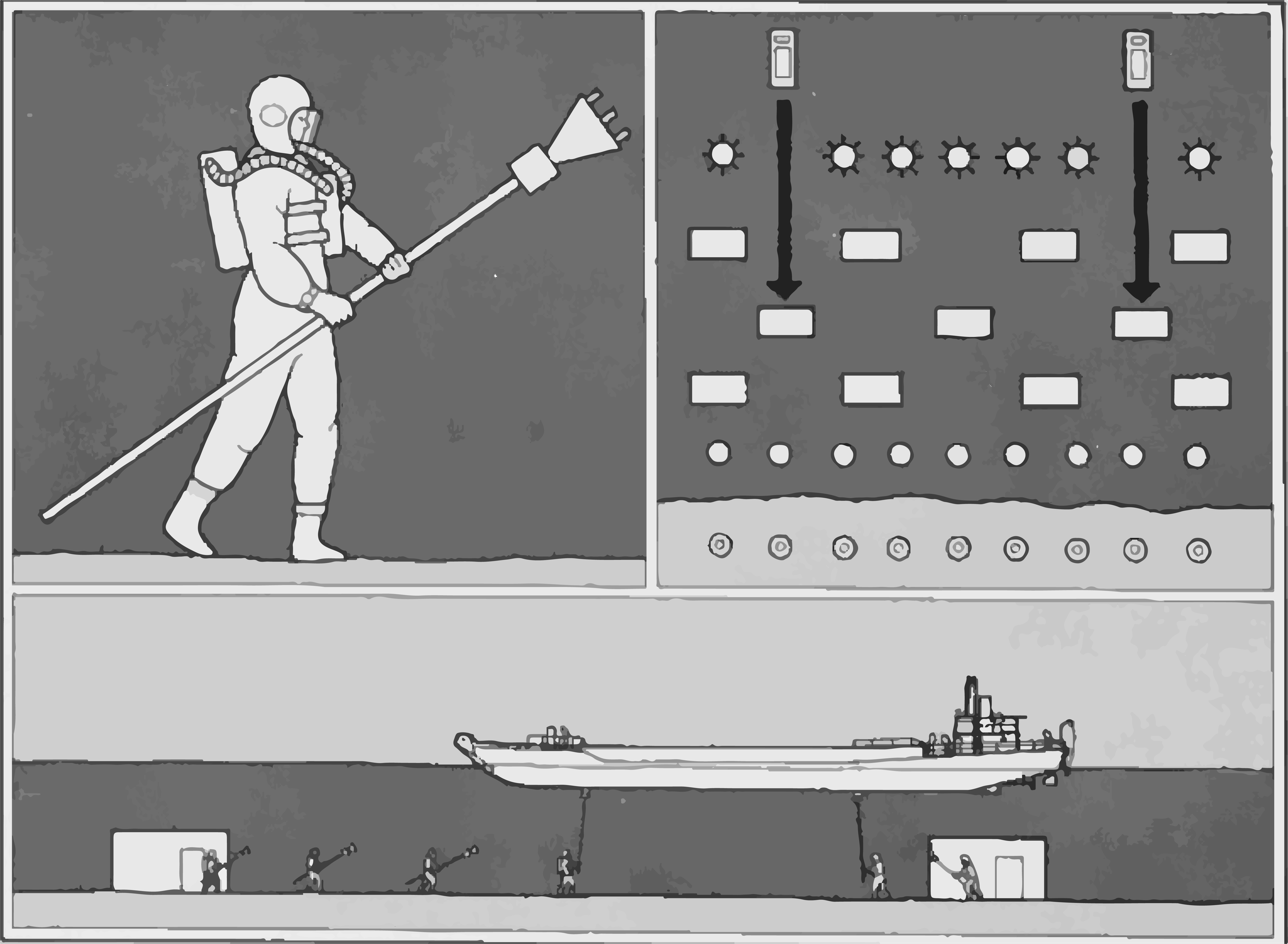
Fukuryu attack diagram

Men were to be armed with a Type 5 attack mine containing 15 kg (33 lb) of explosives, fitted to a 5 m (16 ft) bamboo pole. While concealed underwater, men, expecting to be killed by the resulting explosion, would use the pole to push the contact-fuzed explosive against the hull of a landing craft passing overhead. Off each potential invasion beach, an inventory of mines was anchored to the bottom for use by the submerged men. Three strings of mines were fifty meters apart, and men would be stationed sixty meters apart, staggered so there would be a man for each 20-meter length of beach.

== Concept ==
Surprise was essential to avoid comparatively simple anti-personnel explosive countermeasures previously used to discourage Italian frogmen in the Mediterranean. Experiments were conducted with underwater foxholes of concrete pipe with steel doors. Preliminary tests with dogs indicated these foxholes would reduce the effects of nearby explosions. Plans were made for larger reinforced concrete stations capable of sheltering six to eighteen men. These larger stations would have been manufactured ashore in a variety of shapes to avoid detection, and then sunk at depths of less than fifteen meters. The Fukuryu were part of a three-stage system of mines including an offshore row of bottom mines to be released by trip wires to float up under passing landing craft, and rows of stationary magnetic and contact-fuzed mines in shallow water closer to the beach.

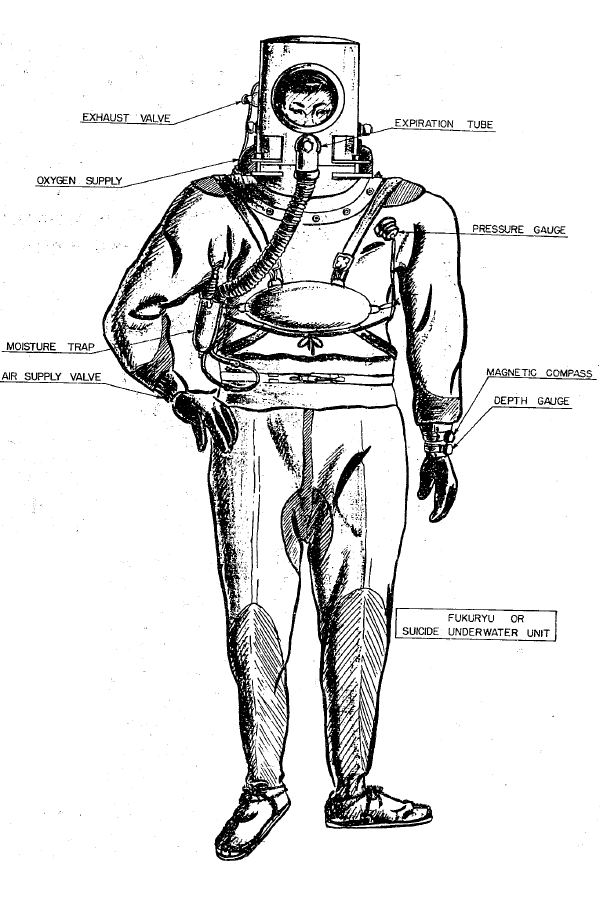
A sketch of a Fukuryu suit by United States Navy personnel (1946)

== Implementation ==
One thousand diving suits were ready by 15 August 1945, and eight thousand more had been ordered. Yokosuka had 450 suits, and both Kure and Sasebo had sixty suits. None of the planned ten thousand Type-5 attack mines had been completed, but four hundred dummy mines had been produced for training. Several deaths occurred during training due to malfunctions. Only twelve hundred men had been trained when Japan surrendered before the invasion of the Japanese mainland occurred. There are reports of some strikes that allegedly made use of similar military tactics:

- The infantry landing craft (gunboat) LCI(G)-404 was damaged by suicide swimmers in Yoo Passage, Palau Islands, on January 8, 1945.
- Three Japanese suicide swimmers attempted an attack upon the surveying ship USS Hydrographer (AGS-2) with an explosive laden raft in Schonian Harbor, Palau Group, on February 10, 1945.

== See also ==
- Kamikaze
- Smertnik
- Lunge mine
- Kaiten
