= Fresnel lantern =

Lantern using a Fresnel lens

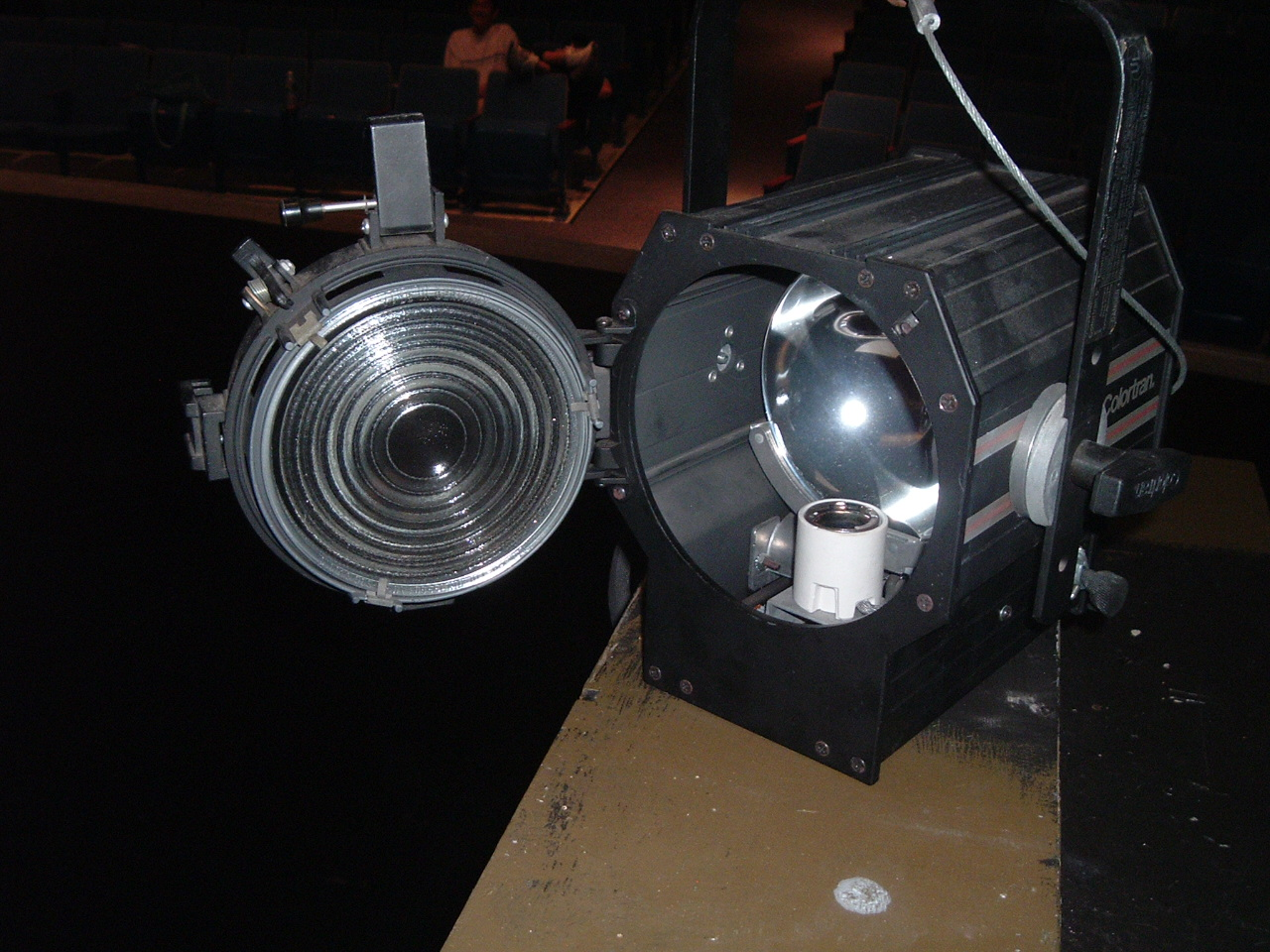
A Fresnel with the lens open to show the ridges. There is no lamp in the instrument

A Fresnel lantern (pronounced frəˈnɛl or fruh-nel) is a common lantern used in theatre that employs a Fresnel lens to wash light over an area of the stage. The lens produces a wider, soft-edged beam than a spotlight or key light, and is commonly used for back light and top light.

== Description ==
1: Cross section of a Fresnel lens 2: Cross section of a conventional plano-convex lens of equivalent power

The distinctive lens used in a Fresnel lantern is named after its inventor, Augustin-Jean Fresnel, who developed it for use in lighthouses. It has a 'stepped' appearance instead of the 'full' or 'smooth' face of other lenses. This allows the lens to focus the light by tilting each successive ring of glass slightly more steeply as its distance increases from the center. If the glass were completely flat, this would cause a corresponding pattern of circles of light, so Fresnel lenses are usually stippled on the flat side. This pattern of small bumps helps to break up the light passing through the lens and gives Fresnels their characteristic soft beam. This means that the intensity of the light is consistent across the spread of the beam of light, as opposed to being less intense around the edges as in an ellipsoidal reflector spotlight (ERS).

The stepped lens design also causes less heat buildup than does a plano-convex lens of the same angle.

== Construction ==
Theatrical Fresnel lanterns are typically made in three-, six-, or eight-inch lens diameters, with lamps ranging in power from 150 W to 2,000 W. The three-inch variety is referred to as an inkie. Fresnel lenses can be placed close to the light source and are inexpensive to produce.

In film lighting lenses range in size from 2 to 24 inches, and lamp power between 150 W and 24,000 W.

Fresnels use a spherical reflector, with the filament of the lamp at its focus point. This effectively doubles the light delivered by the fixture, as all that is emitted backwards into the reflector is reflected back out the front. As with most lighting fixtures, the lamp and reflector cannot move independently, and are moved together as a unit to focus the beam. This is done by a slider on the bottom of the lantern, or a worm track and crank in the back of the unit. The lamps work best with their bases facing up, with bulb life shortened significantly when mounted upside down.

Since the reflector of a Fresnel lantern cannot be larger than its lens aperture, the lamps are not very efficient. Only the light emitted straight forward or backward (and redirected forward by the reflector) is utilized, with the rest absorbed by the casing as waste heat.

The degree to which the lamp may be focused is limited by the length of the housing. To reduce the width of the beam, the lamp and reflector are moved further back from the lens (spot focus). However, the further back in the housing the lamp is placed, the more light is wasted in the housing.

== Use ==
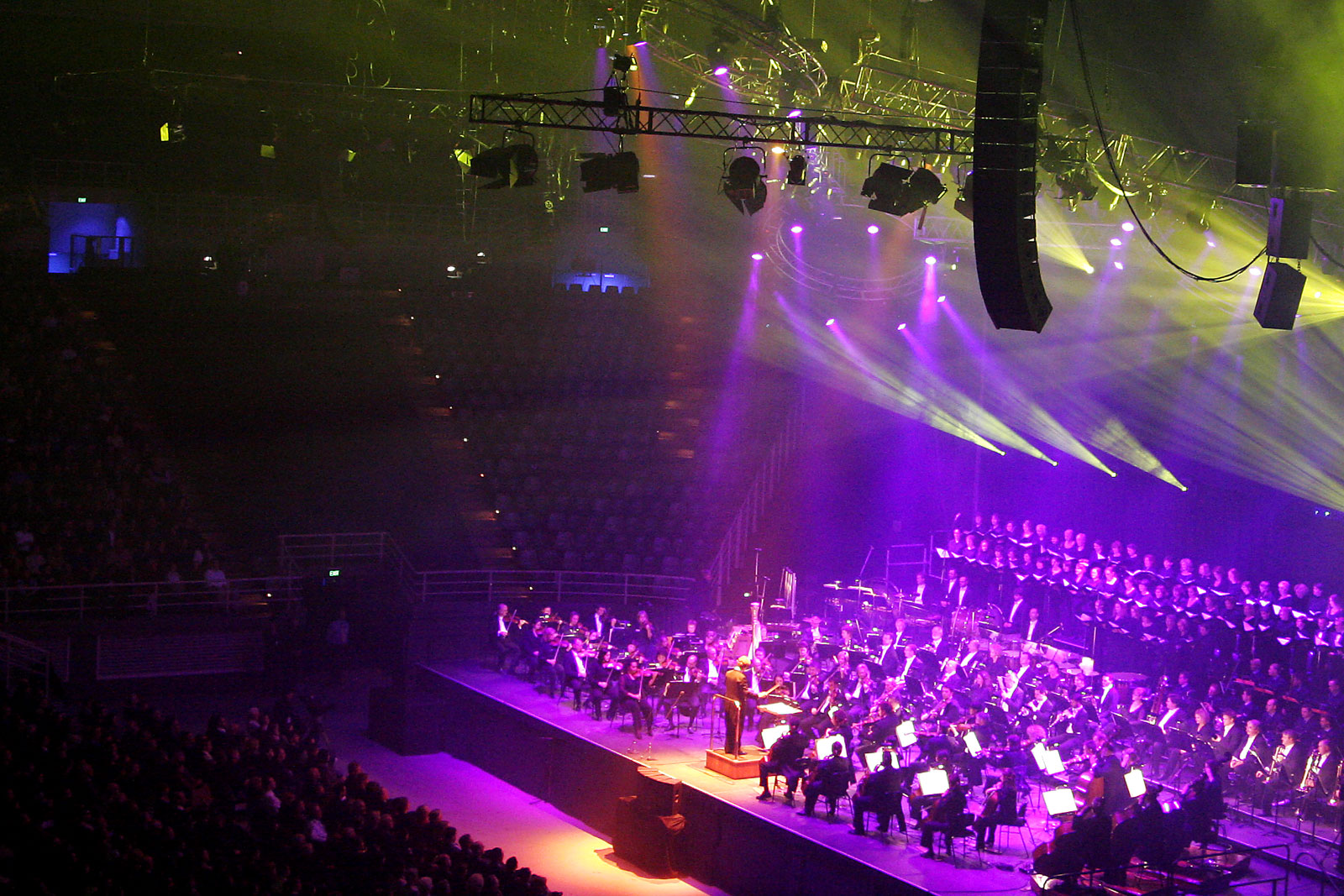
Fresnel lanterns in use at a classical concert; they can be seen silhouetted against the stage and each sports a barn door

In the theater and dance world, Fresnels are most often used for top or backlighting, at medium throw distances. In small venues, they are occasionally used for front light, although the relative lack of control, when compared to an ellipsoidal, is a major disadvantage. The distinctive soft beam of a fresnel can make it very useful as a special in certain situations.

While the focus can alter the size of the beam, the distinctive scatter of light that the Fresnel lens emits also requires a way of controlling its shape. Since Fresnels cannot use internal shutters, such as those found in an ellipsoidal spotlight, they are often fitted with distinctive barn doors to control the spill and shape the beam of light. These are large metal flaps that may be mounted just beyond the color slot at the front of the lantern. They are colloquially known as "Harris Flaps" in the United Kingdom theatre industry.
