= Japanese Special Attack Units =

Japanese military units during World War II

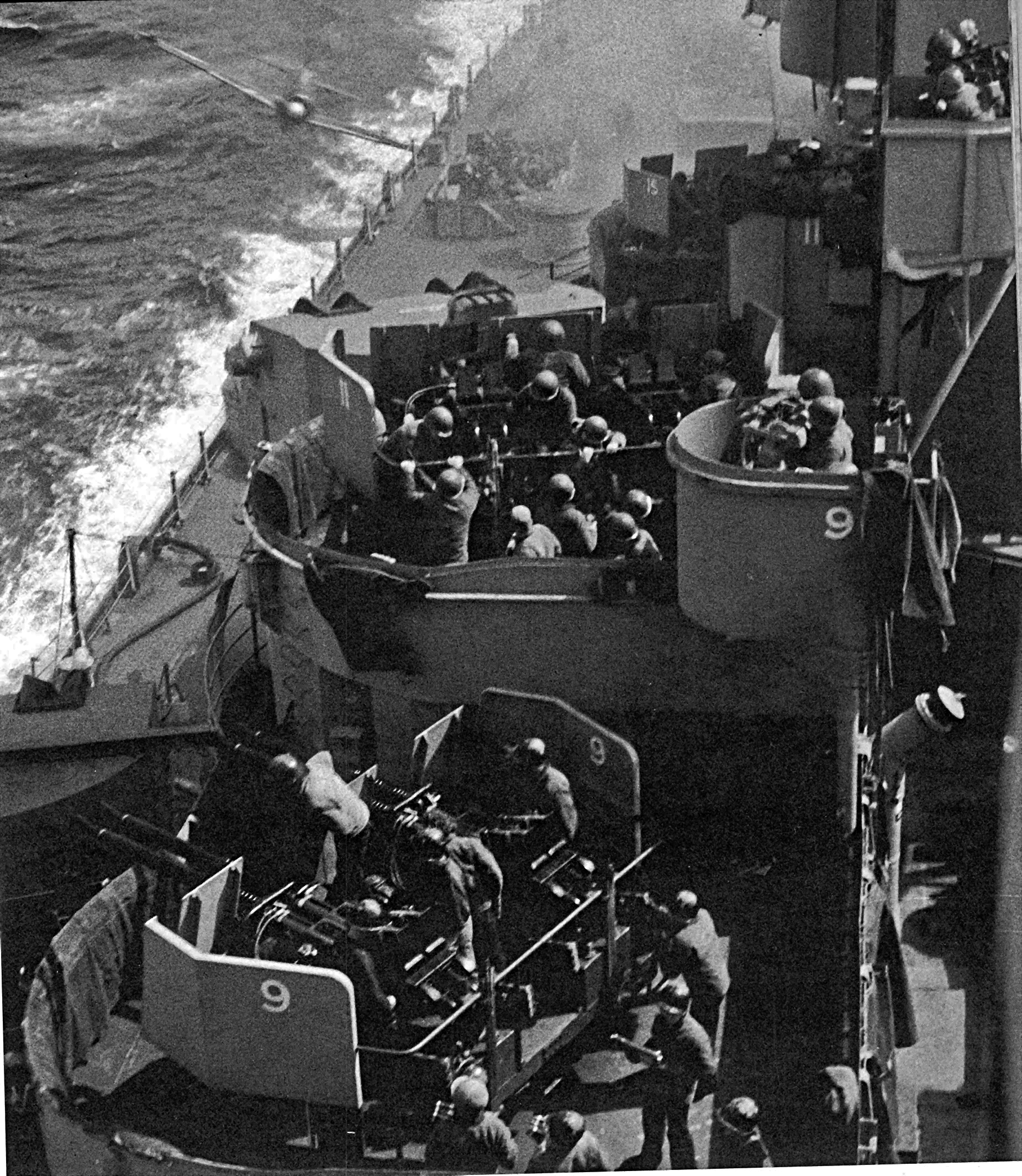
On 11 April 1945, a Navy Type 0 carrier fighter of the Kamikaze Special Attack Squadron's 5th Kemmu Squadron (piloted by Flight Sgt. Setsuo Ishino) just before crashing into the USS Missouri

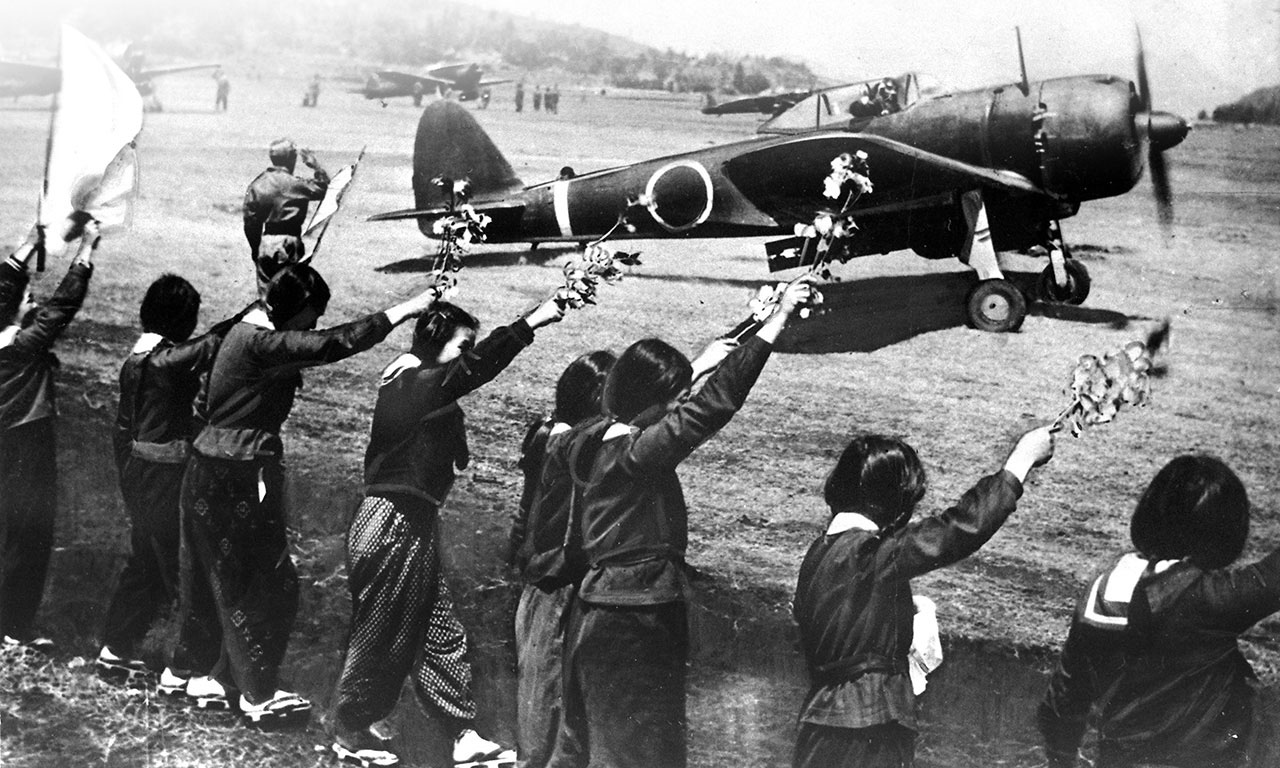
On 12 April 1945, a VBIED variant of fighter plane "Hayabusa" (flown by Sub-lieutenant Toshio Anazawa) of the 20th Shimbu Squadron of the Army Special Attack Unit is seen departing from Chiran Army Airfield, while female students of the Nadeshiko Squadron of Chiran Town High School for Girls look on.

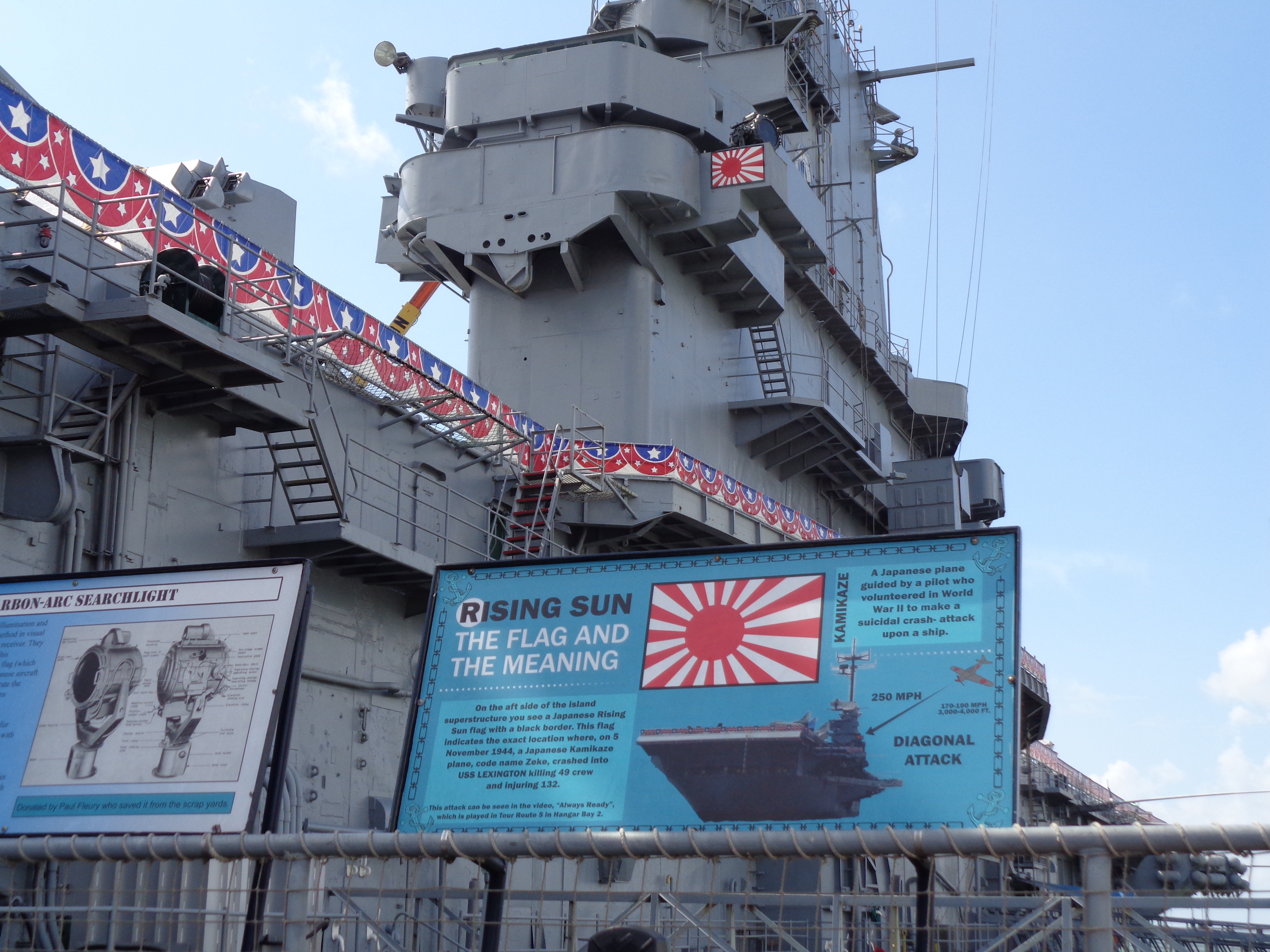
USS Lexington museum in Corpus Christi, Texas. An account of the suicide attack Lexington suffered on 5 November 1944 (a suicide plane hit the Rising Sun Flag spot).

During World War II, Japanese Special Attack Units (特別攻撃隊, tokubetsu kōgeki tai; often abbreviated to 特攻隊 tokkōtai), also called shimbu-tai, were specialized units of the Imperial Japanese Navy and Imperial Japanese Army, normally used for suicide missions (specifically suicide attacks). They included kamikaze aircraft, fukuryu frogmen, and several types of suicide boats and submarines as well as smertnik infantrymen.

Weapons similar in effect to these suicide weapons are used today by modern militaries, though as drones or otherwise automated rather than human-guided. Notable example is loitering munitions and one-way attack drones, which are both popularly known as kamikaze drones. Iranian developed HESA Shahed 136 and its counterparts such as the American reverse-engineered LUCAS became particularly common in the 2020s, used widely in conflicts such as Russian invasion of Ukraine and the 2026 Iran War.

== Background ==
Towards the end of the Pacific War, the Japanese were increasingly anticipating an American attack into the country and preparation was made for its defense. This was called Ketsugō and the operation included the formation of specialized Japanese units. The move was driven by the realization that, in order to defend their homeland, conventional warfare was no longer sufficient. The recruitment of soldiers willing to die in the suicide missions was, therefore, easily carried out. The suicide attack was also an accepted method of fighting and this is largely attributed to Japan's highly militaristic society as demonstrated by the samurai system with its bushido code, which established a legacy that honors and idealizes self-sacrifice.

Japan saw the efficacy of the specialized units during their deployment in the Philippines in summer-fall 1944 when special attack units executed their first missions. Japan saw that they were able to achieve results with limited resources. Historians view the success of the suicide tactics as an important driver to Japanese war policies after 1943. Suicide attacks began in 1944, and British historians describe the campaign as a failure.

== Aircraft ==
=== Ohka suicide rocket aircraft ===
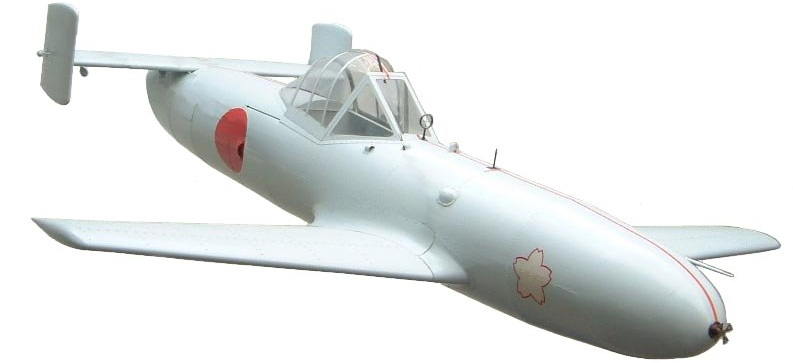
Ohka at the Yasukuni Shrine

The Yokosuka MXY-7 Ohka (櫻花; "cherry blossom") was a purpose-built kamikaze aircraft employed by the Imperial Japanese Navy Air Service towards the end of World War II. The US gave the aircraft the Japanese name Baka ("idiot").

It was a small flying bomb that was carried underneath a Mitsubishi G4M2e "Betty", Yokosuka P1Y Ginga "Frances" (guided Type 22) or planned Heavy Nakajima G8N Renzan "Rita" (transport type 33) bomber to within range of its target; on release, the pilot would first glide towards the target and when close enough he would fire the Ohka's engine(s) and dive onto the ship to destroy it. That final approach was almost unstoppable (especially for Type 11) because the aircraft gained tremendous speed. Later versions were designed to be launched from coastal air bases and caves, and even from submarines equipped with aircraft catapults, although none were actually used this way.

=== Shinryū ===
The Mizuno Shinryū (神龍; "Divine Dragon") was a proposed rocket-powered kamikaze aircraft designed for the Imperial Japanese Navy towards the end of World War II. It never reached production.

=== Tsurugi ===
The Nakajima Ki-115 Tsurugi (剣; "Sword") was a one-man kamikaze aircraft developed by the Imperial Japanese Army Air Force in the closing stages of World War II in late 1945.

=== Kokusai Ta-Go ===
The Kokusai Ta-Go was a prototype kamikaze aircraft developed by Captain Yoshiyuki Mizuyama and Nippon Kokusai in late 1945 as a simpler aircraft than the Nakajima Ki-115.

=== Baika ===
The Kawanishi Baika (梅花; "Ume Blossom") was a pulsejet-powered kamikaze aircraft under development for the Imperial Japanese Navy towards the end of World War II. The war ended before any were built. The design was inspired by the manned version of the German V1 flying bomb, the Fieseler Fi 103R "Reichenberg".

== Boats ==
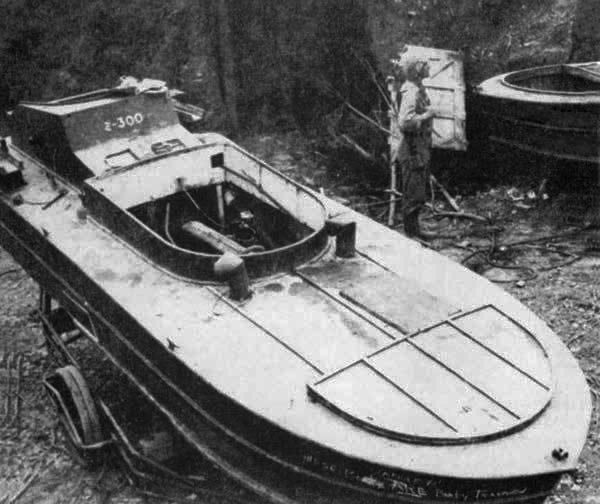
A Shinyo suicide boat

=== Shin'yō and Maru-Ni ===
The Shin'yō (震洋; "Sea Quake") were Japanese suicide boats developed during World War II. They were part of the wider Special Attack Units program. These fast motorboats were piloted by one man, to speeds of around 30 kn (56 km/h; 35 mph). The Maru-Ni was an Army version with two depth charges the operator would drop and try to escape before detonation.

Around 6,200 Shin'yō were produced for the Imperial Japanese Navy and 3,000 Maru-Ni for the Imperial Japanese Army. Around 400 were deployed to Okinawa and Formosa, and the rest were stored on the coast of Japan for the ultimate defense against the invasion of the Home islands.

== Submarines ==
=== Kaiten ===
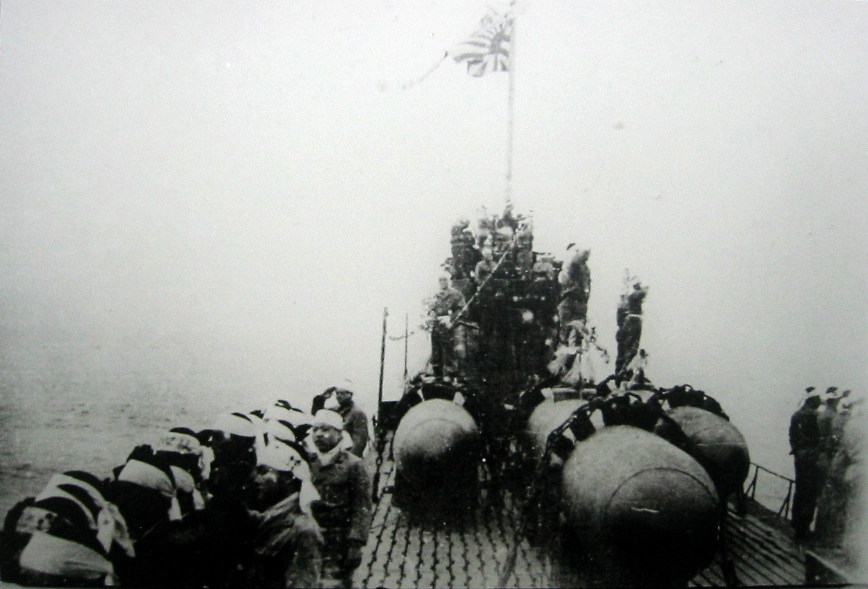
Kaiten manned torpedoes, stacked on top of a departing submarine

The Kaiten (回天; variously translated as "Change the World", "Returning to Heaven" or "Heaven-shaker") was a torpedo modified as a suicide weapon, and used by the Imperial Japanese Navy in the final stages of World War II.

Early designs allowed for the pilot to escape after the final acceleration towards the target, although whether this could have been done successfully is doubtful. There is no record of any pilot attempting to escape or intending to do so, and this provision was dropped from later production Kaitens.

The inventor of the Kaiten, Lt. Hiroshi Kuroki, was lost during one of the first training missions. When the submarine was raised, a note written during his final minutes before death was found, sending his respects to his family and detailing the cause of the accident and how to repair the defect.

=== Kairyū ===
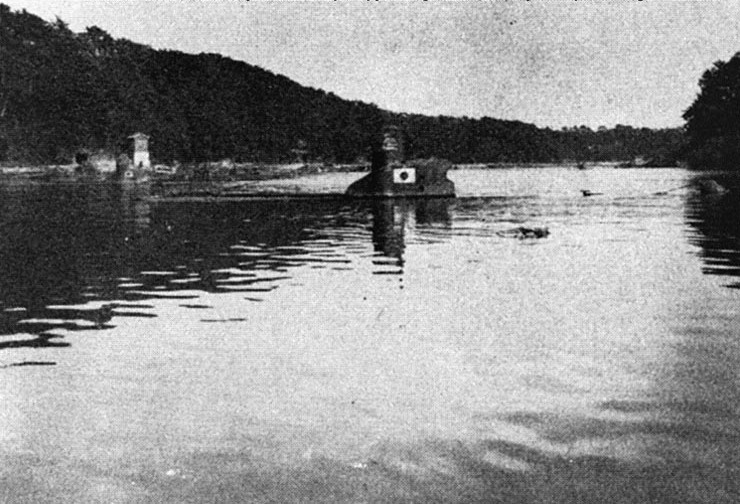
A Kairyū in the Aburatsubo inlet

The Kairyū (海龍; "Sea Dragon") was a class of Suicide midget submarines of the Imperial Japanese Navy, designed in 1943–1944, and produced from the beginning of 1945. These submarines were designed to meet the invading American Naval forces upon their anticipated approach of Tokyo.

These submarines had a two-man crew and were armed with two torpedoes and an internal warhead for suicide missions. Over 760 of these submarines were planned, and by August 1945, 200 had been manufactured, most of them at the Yokosuka shipyard.

== Personnel ==
=== Fukuryu ===
Suicide divers (伏龍, Fukuryū; "Crouching dragons") were a part of the Special Attack Units prepared to resist the invasion of the Home islands by Allied forces. They were armed with a mine containing 15 kg (33 lb) of explosive, fitted to a 5 m (16 ft) bamboo pole. They would dive and stick the pole into the hull of an enemy ship, destroying themselves in the process. They were equipped with a diving jacket and trousers, diving shoes, and a diving helmet fixed by four bolts. They were typically weighed down with 9 kg (20 lb) of lead, and had two bottles of compressed air at 150 bars. They were expected to be able to walk at a depth of 5 to 7 m (16 to 23 ft), for about six hours. Several deaths occurred during training due to malfunctions, but this weapon is only known to have been used a few times operationally:

- 8 January 1945: Damage by suicide divers to Infantry landing craft (gunboat) LCI(G)-404 in Yoo Passage, Palaus.
- 10 February 1945: Attempted attack by suicide divers on surveying ship USS Hydrographer (AGS-2) in Schonian Harbor, Palaus.

=== Smertnik ===
Smertnik, Russian for "condemned man", were Imperial Japanese Army personnel who conducted suicide attacks against tanks and armored personnel. They would use either the Type 99 mine or cardboard boxes full of explosives. Such attacks include:

- 17 April 1945: Three M4 Shermans were defeated by a Type 95 Ha-Go and a Type 97 Chi-Ha, each armed with a one metre rod tipped with 20 kg of explosives, and two soldiers with a sack of depth charges and grenades slung around their waists.
- Burma Campaign: Six M3A3 tanks were destroyed in a month by personnel using the Type 99 mine.
- Battle of Okinawa: Six M4 Shermans were destroyed in one day by men armed with cardboard boxes of explosives.
- Soviet invasion of Manchuria: Japanese soldiers attempted to use satchel charges and other improvised explosives against Soviet tanks, leading to the name smertnik.

== See also ==
- Banzai charge – Term for Japanese human wave attacks during WWII
- Chiran Special Attack Peace Museum – Museum in Kagoshima, Japan
- Jibakutai – Imperial Japanese suicide bombing unit
- Martyrs of Japan
- National Revolutionary Army § Dare to Die Corps, (Chinese nationalists)
- Piso Point – Japanese WWII naval base in the Philippines
- Takasago Volunteers: Kaoru Special Attack Corps
- Suicide attack § During World War II
- Suicide in Japan

=== Lists ===
- List of Imperial Japanese Army air-to-surface special attack units
- List of Imperial Japanese Navy air-to-surface special attack units
