= Smertnik =

Pejorative for Japanese infantrymen

A smertnik (Russian: смертник, lit. 'death-man') was an infantryman of the Imperial Japanese Army that launched suicide attacks against armored columns. The term was a pejorative used by Red Army personnel during the Soviet invasion of Manchuria (August 1945).

== Background ==
Japanese–Soviet relations had been somewhat stable throughout most of World War II. In April 1941, the Soviet Union and the Japanese Empire signed a neutrality treaty that held even after the June 1941 invasion of the Soviet Union by Japan's key European partner, Nazi Germany. This invasion also prevented the Soviet Union from helping the Western Allies fight Japan after the attack on Pearl Harbor on 7 December 1941. Soviet leader Joseph Stalin also believed that Japan would continue to expand southwards and thus away from the USSR, reducing the urgency of committing Soviet troops against Japan. After tentative promises at the 1943 Moscow Conference to Cordell Hull and W. A. Harriman that the USSR would enter the war against Japan once Germany was defeated, Stalin made a full commitment to Winston Churchill and Franklin Roosevelt at the Tehran Conference later that year.

After the German surrender on 8/9 May 1945, the Red Army began moving troops to bolster its forces in the Far East. Shortly after midnight on 9 August 1945, Soviet forces attacked across their own country's border into Manchukuo, a puppet state of the Japanese Empire.

== Combat record ==
Several Japanese suicidal ground attacks had occurred before August 1945, such as during the Battle of Kakazu Ridge and the Battle of Okinawa.

=== Luzon ===
An example of anti-tank suicide attacks by Japanese tanks occurred in April 1945, towards the end of the Battle of Luzon. As Allied forces advanced upon Baguio, where the headquarters of the 14th Area Army were located, a Japanese general ordered the three remaining tanks of the 5th Company, 10th Tank Regiment – a tank unit directly under the command of the headquarters – to halt the advance of the United States Army tank units, which consisted primarily of M4 "Shermans."

Pursuant to this order, company commander Lieutenant Takao Sakurai formed a tank-based suicide unit to ram and repel the U.S. tanks. Sakurai ordered First Lieutenant Niwa and eleven other personnel to form a tank suicide squadron comprising one Type 95 Ha-Go light tank and one Type 97 Chi-Ha medium tank. These two tanks bore an unusual appearance, each fitted with a protruding rod extending 1 metre from the front, tipped with 20 kg of explosives. Furthermore, the four tank crew members who could not fit inside the two tanks were to conduct tank dismounting, two per vehicle. These dismounted crew members each carried a duffel bag filled with depth charges and several hand grenades slung from their waists, intending to carry out a human wave assault by ramming the enemy vehicles. The tank suicide squad, divided between Niwa's two tanks, advanced to Ilisan near Baguio after being seen off by Army Commander Tomoyuki Yamashita. There, they camouflaged their tanks and lay in wait for the American tank column. At 9:00 am on the 17th, Niwa's camouflaged tank unit launched a surprise attack on an American Army M4 medium tank approaching a bend 200 metres northwest of the Ilisan Bridge. Startled by the sudden appearance, the lead American tank missteered and plunged 50 metres down a cliff. The two Niwa tanks then charged to ram the following vehicles. An M4's gunfire struck the turret of Niwa's Type 95 Light Tank, blowing it off, but undeterred, the two Japanese tanks rammed the M4s head-on. The tank crew members, who had been conducting a tank dismount, jumped from the tanks just before the collision. As the tanks charged, they rammed the M4 medium tanks. Surviving Japanese tank crew members threw grenades at American tank crew members attempting to escape from the M4 medium tanks or drew their swords and charged in to slash at them.

Both sides' four tanks exploded and burned, their wreckage obstructing the American tank column's route of advance. As the roads near Ilisan were narrow, removal of the wreckage was difficult. The US Army was delayed for about a week, during which time the Baguio headquarters was able to withdraw in an orderly manner, along with large numbers of wounded and military supplies. Japanese official war histories refer to this as the "tank headbutt".

Japanese infantry had neither sufficient artillery, such as rapid-fire guns and long-range field guns, nor infantry-portable anti-tank equipment, comparable to the American Bazooka, German Panzerfaust, and British PIAT, to halt the large number of tanks deployed by Allied forces. Consequently, the Japanese were compelled to devise methods for close combat against tanks. Various forms of anti-tank suicide attacks were employed, but the standard-issue close-quarters tactic involved attaching the Type 99 mine to a tank's armour plate and detonating it. Japanese infantrymen would close in on enemy tanks carrying the Type 99 Anti-Tank Grenade. They would magnetically attach it to the hull, pull the safety pin from the fuse section, and strike the head. The grenade would then detonate approximately five seconds later. It could also be thrown like a hand grenade. When successfully adhered to armour plates, a single grenade offered only about 20mm penetration, and even two stacked grenades provided merely 30mm penetration – hardly devastating. However, this proved sufficient against light tanks. In Burma alone, six M3A3 tanks were confirmed destroyed within a single month. An analysis by the US Army Intelligence Department stated: "In light of recent combat experience in Burma, this report on damage caused by the Type 99 Anti-Armour Grenade clearly indicates that this weapon will become one of the principal threats to Allied tanks posed by Japanese forces." Furthermore, the Anti-Armour Grenade was also employed by the Giretsu Airborne Unit during their assault on airfields in Okinawa, proving effective in destroying aircraft.

=== Okinawa ===
By late 1944, as concerns grew over an Allied invasion of the Southwestern Islands including Okinawa, the Deputy Chief of Staff for Logistics at the Army General Staff Headquarters instructed senior staff officers of various armies, including Senior Staff Officer Hiromichi Yahara of the 32nd Army: "Our anti-tank guns are few in number and will be destroyed immediately by the enemy's fierce artillery fire. If the poor fight using the same tactics as the rich, defeat is inevitable." Therefore, the Japanese Army devised a 'new patented' anti-tank tactic. This involved soldiers carrying improvised explosive devices containing 10 kg of gunpowder and ramming enemy tanks to detonate them. Experimental results indicated that this 10 kg charge could destroy any type of enemy tank. He thus revealed this suicide attack tactic. Drawing inspiration from the Kamikaze tactic, the 32nd Army prepared numerous improvised explosive devices: cardboard boxes packed with explosives. When Allied forces eventually landed in Okinawa, Japanese soldiers either hurled these improvised explosives at the tracks of American tanks or charged at them, detonating the charges upon impact. This suicide tactic proved effective. During the fierce Battle of Kaju, these infantry suicide charges destroyed six M4 medium tanks in a single day. The US Army's official report noted with caution: "Japanese soldiers carrying explosive boxes, in particular, posed a major threat to (US) tanks." American tank crews were wary of Japanese soldiers launching anti-tank suicide attacks using improvised explosive devices or Type 99 anti-armour grenades. Upon spotting Japanese soldiers attempting to attack a tank, they prioritised firing their vehicle-mounted machine guns. However, if bullets struck the grenades the soldiers were carrying, they would explode, sometimes blowing up the surrounding Japanese soldiers along with them. Furthermore, when spotting trenches where Japanese soldiers might be hiding with multiple grenades for anti-tank suicide attacks, tank crews would open their hatches and throw grenades into the trenches, sweeping out the Japanese soldiers lying in wait for their assault. However, the greatest threat to American tanks was not anti-tank suicide attacks, but rather anti-tank guns such as the Type 1 47mm Field Gun and the Type 90 Field Gun, or the Type 93 Tank Mine. The improvised explosive devices primarily used in anti-tank suicide attacks often failed to inflict significant damage on tanks, as the blast spread outward rather than concentrating on the target. Additionally, a weapon known as the 'spear-type explosive device' was developed and deployed. This involved attaching a cone-shaped shaped charge warhead to the end of a pole, designed to literally spear and detonate enemy tanks. Its effectiveness remains unclear. Through coordinated efforts including anti-tank suicide attacks, the 32nd Army destroyed 272 M4 medium tanks alone during the Battle of Okinawa (Army: 221 tanks; Marines: 51 tanks).

=== Soviet invasion of Manchuria ===
The second-rate troops of the Imperial Japanese Army guarding the Manchurian border found themselves technologically outmatched by Soviet armor; the Type 94 anti-tank guns were only effective against light tank models such as the T-26 or BT-5, but proved subpar when faced with models such as the T-34/85 or the ISU-152. These heavier armored vehicles were used in particularly large numbers by the Far Eastern Front, where the initial fighting of the Soviet invasion was fiercest. Japanese artillery pieces that might have been capable of penetrating stronger Soviet vehicles if given the correct ammunition usually lacked the critical armor-piercing shells that would have been required for their task. Even weakly-armored Soviet models such as the SU-76 light self-propelled gun suffered remarkably low casualty rates (20 casualties from enemy action out of 952 vehicles used), signalling an acute weakness of Japanese anti-tank capabilities in the sector.

As a result, Japanese commanders resorted to kamikaze-esque suicide attacks by infantry squads with satchel charges and improvised explosives. These Japanese soldiers were to charge at the enemy tanks and throw themselves under the vehicles to destroy them with detonations near the weak bottom armor. Attacks of this kind were usually repelled under devastating casualties, though some of the Japanese soldiers, whom their Soviet opponents soon dubbed smertniks ('condemned men'), managed to destroy several T-34s at Mudanjiang. In some cases, the suicide runners reached their targets, but the explosive charges proved too weak to disable the targeted Soviet tank. Smertniks continued their charges against Soviet troops of various types, including against Soviet sappers clearing Japanese minefields. The impact of their attacks on the overall operational situation was marginal; the Soviet advance continued unimpeded.

== See also ==
- Kamikaze
  - Japanese Special Attack Units
- Lunge mine
- Fukuryu
- Banzai charge
