= Piso Point =

Japanese WWII naval base in the Philippines

Coordinates: 7°03′26″N 125°56′50″E

Piso Point is a former Japanese naval base throughout World War II which is located at the eastern portion of Davao Gulf, across from Davao City, Philippines. It was also a harbor for Japanese suicide boats which had been harassing American shipping in Davao Gulf. During the liberation of the Philippines from the Japanese on May 14, 1945, many of the Japanese suicide boats were annihilated by the U.S. Navy.

== History ==
During World War II, When the Japanese invaded the southern Philippines, they occupied Davao City and Piso Point. Piso Point is also strategically located at the south with many overhanging trees which allow the Japanese to initiate camouflage attacks against their enemies.

However, in April 1945, The U.S. Army was given the mission to eradicate Japanese troops in Davao City and in both eastern and western portion of Davao Gulf.

On May 10, 1945], Edgar D. Hoagland, naval commander of the 24th Division of the U.S. army was given a special duty to survey the area for potential Japanese enemies hiding at the Davao valley including Piso Point. Although commander Hoagland did not witness any suspicious acts at first, he continued to patrol at the north leaving behind the LCI vessel. The LCI vessel was abruptly attacked by Japanese suicide boats. No one could trace the whereabouts of the Japanese suicide boats since these boats remained under camouflage with the aid of numerous overhanging trees and maze inlets.

On May 10, 1945, an anonymous tip from the guerillas brought Commander Edgar D. Hoagland together with his Patrol Torpedo boats at Piso Point once more. There, they have discovered that the Japanese have mastered the art of camouflage so well that they hid their suicide boats under mangroves with green, freshly cut palm leaves that enable them to be unseen at a distance greater than 100 yards. Credits are given to Marine Major Richard E. Maulsby, Pilot of a Marine Mitchell bomber and Marine First Lieutenant Doit L. Fish for discovering the hidden Japanese suicide boats.

== Battle at Piso Point ==
On May 14, 1945, Edgar D. Hoagland, naval commander of the 24th Division of the U.S. army together with Ens. John Adams, USNR and their patrol torpedo boats approached Piso Point to destroy the remaining Japanese troops along with their suicide boats. They won the battle against the Japanese troops and destroyed their remaining paraphernalia.

== See also ==
- Japanese Special Attack Units
