= Jibakutai =

Imperial Japanese suicide bombing unit

The Jibakutai (自爆隊, Jibakutai; "Self-explosion Corps") were suicide attack units formed during the Japanese occupation of the Dutch East Indies (present-day Indonesia) of World War II. The corps was created on 8 December 1944, coinciding with the third anniversary of the "Greater East Asia War". The Jibakutai numbered c. 50,000 members who received training in Cibarusah, Bogor Regency for two months, supervised by Imperial Japanese Army Captain Yanagawa.

== Structure ==
The formation of the corps was inspired by the late-war Japanese Special Attack Units. The Japanese word Jibakutai quickly became a loanword in Indonesian, meaning "to attack an enemy with reckless abandon or ramming oneself into the enemy", the latter often referring to an attack with an explosive belt or other explosive device. Jibakutai troops were considered second-rate, who would advance in support of a main force unit withdrawal or to force a breakthrough. These troops were recruited by the Empire of Japan to face the Allies in urban warfare following their anticipated arrival in the Indonesian archipelago. As such, units of Jibakutai accompanied the "Defenders of the Homeland" (PETA; Indonesian: Pembela Tanah Air, Japanese: 郷土防衛義勇軍, romanized: Kyōdo Bōei Giyūgun) and other Giyūgun units, though their position in the military hierarchy was certainly not equal. Jibakutai members did not have military backgrounds or even basic military education; its member base consisted of ordinary native Indonesians with various professions, including teachers, journalists, farmers, and others, who were not given boarding or pay. Instead, they returned to their respective homes and professions after every training session. Training consisted of drill and the use of bamboo spears. Unlike PETA on Java, they were not equipped with firearms, nor the knowledge and skills to handle these. The main weapons in the Jibakutai arsenal were their suicidal courage and fighting spirit (精神, "seishin") to repel the invaders.

== History ==
During the Japanese occupation of the Dutch East Indies, the Jibakutai never attained recognition as a monolithic organization. The corps instead became an expression of the determination of its individual members to defend their homeland from interference from within and without. Following the Proclamation of Indonesian Independence, the PETA Giyūgun and Heiho units, laid the foundation for the Indonesian National Armed Forces. The Jibakutai remained separate and renamed themselves Barisan Berani Mati (BBM; "Dare to Die Front"). The death-defying nature of the unit was on display during the 1945 Battle of Surabaya against the British and British Indian Army. Scores of armored vehicles such as Universal Carriers and even tanks exploded because of the actions of these troops. The members of the BBM operated in small groups. Each group leader carried a bomb, which one of his men would use to attack enemy vehicles or positions at the cost of his own life. These suicide attacks continued until the third day of the battle. Their courage amazed not only their own forces but also the enemy. The British were outraged and accused the Indonesians of soliciting the Japanese to carry out these suicide bombings, believing that only Japanese soldiers were capable of such actions. The Indonesian side instead saw this as proof that they had the same courage required to defend their homeland as the Japanese kamikaze who dared to crash their aircraft into Allied warships.

== See also ==
- Collaboration with the Empire of Japan
- Indonesian National Revolution
- Japanese occupation of the Dutch East Indies
- Japanese Special Attack Units
