= Banzai charge =

Term for Japanese human wave attacks during WWII

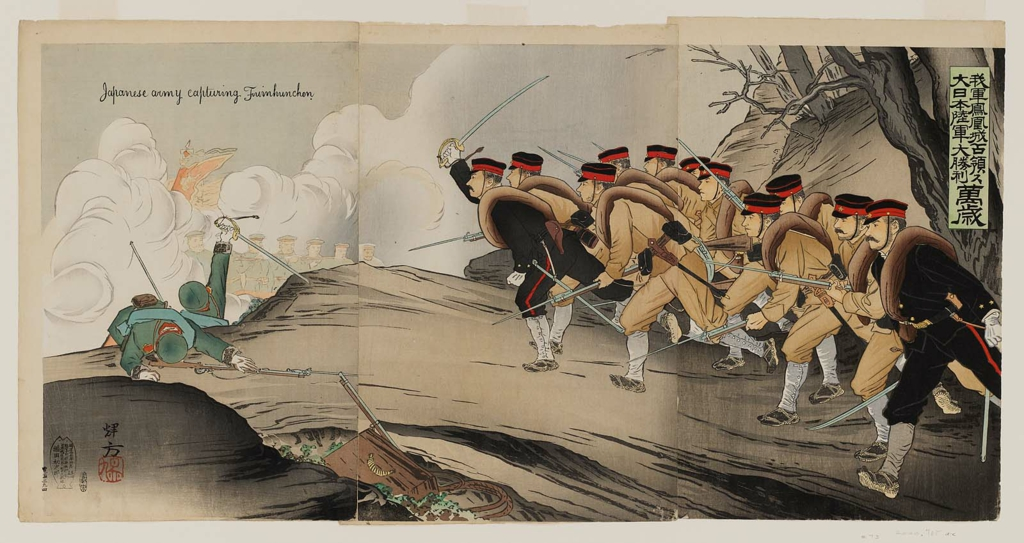
Japanese troops carrying out a human wave attack during the Russo-Japanese War

Banzai charge or Banzai attack (Japanese: バンザイ突撃 or 万歳突撃, banzai totsugeki) is the term that was used by the Allied forces of World War II to refer to Japanese human wave attacks and swarming staged by infantry units. This term came from the Japanese battle cry tennōheika banzai (天皇陛下万歳, 'long live His Imperial Majesty'), and was shortened to banzai, specifically referring to the bayonet charge tactic used by the Imperial Japanese Army during the Pacific War. This tactic was used when the Japanese commanders of infantry battalions foresaw that a battle was about to be lost, as a last ditch effort in thwarting Allied forces.

== Origin ==
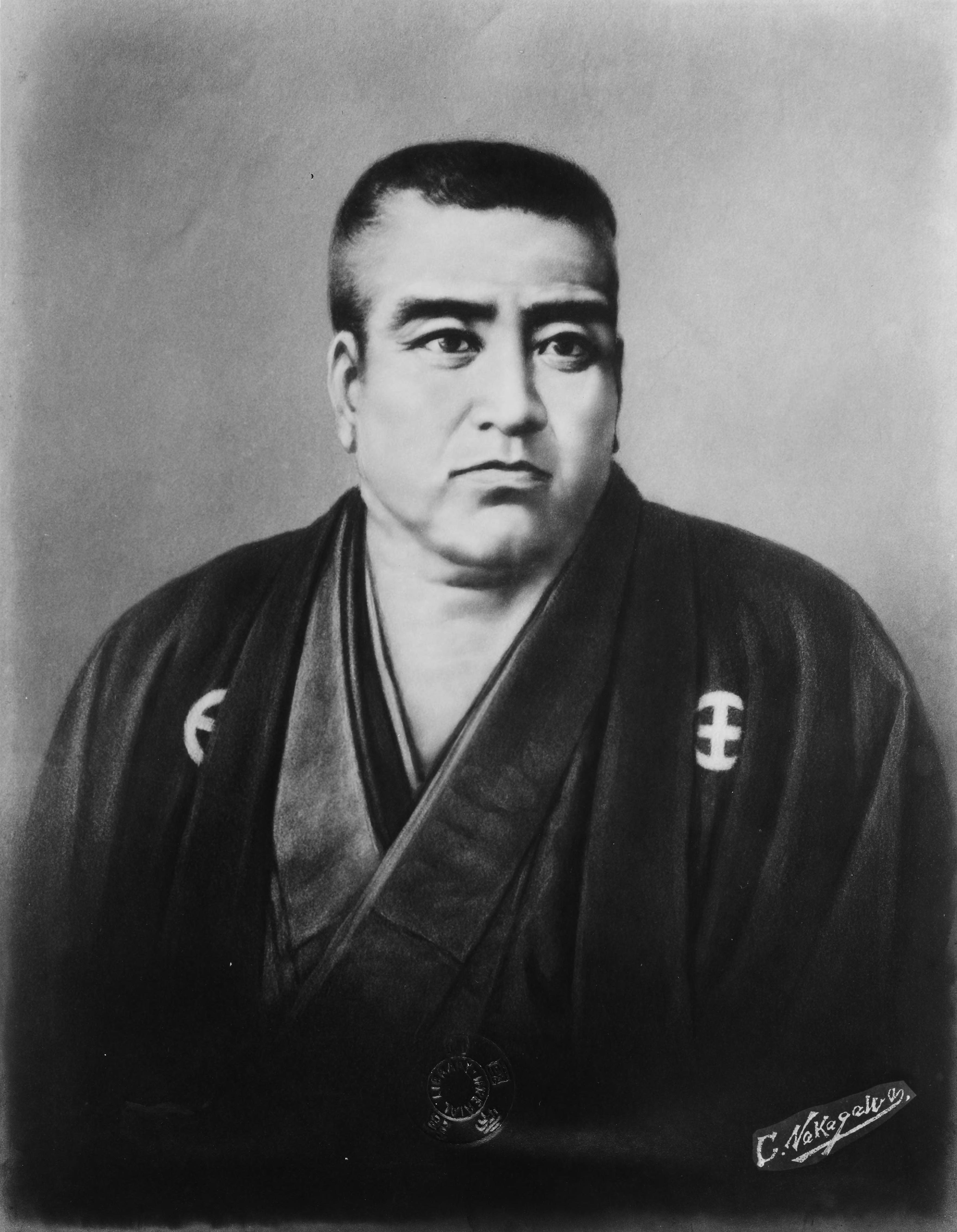
The suicidal charge by the forces of Saigō Takamori at the culmination of the Satsuma Rebellion (1877) inspired the nation of Japan to idealize and romanticize death in battle and to consider suicide an honorable final action.

The banzai charge is considered to be one method of gyokusai (玉砕; 'shattered jewel'; honorable suicide), a suicide attack, or suicide before being captured by the enemy such as seppuku. The origin of the term is a classical Chinese phrase in the 7th-century Book of Northern Qi, which states: 丈夫玉碎恥甎全 ('A true man would [rather] be the shattered jewel, ashamed to be the intact tile'). Among the rules there existed a code of honor that was later used by Japanese military governments.

With the revolutionary change in the Meiji Restoration and frequent wars against China and Russia, the militarist government of Japan adopted the concepts of Bushido to condition the country's population to be ideologically obedient to the emperor. Impressed with how samurai were trained to commit suicide when a great humiliation was about to befall them, the government taught troops that it was a greater humiliation to surrender to the enemy than to die. The suicidal charge by the forces of Saigō Takamori at the culmination of the Satsuma Rebellion (1877) also inspired the nation to idealize and romanticize death in battle and to consider suicide an honorable final action.

During the Siege of Port Arthur human wave attacks were conducted on Russian artillery and machine guns by the Japanese which ended up becoming suicidal. Since the Japanese suffered massive casualties in the attacks, one description of the aftermath was that "[a] thick, unbroken mass of corpses covered the cold earth like a coverlet".

In the 1930s, the Japanese found this type of attack to be effective in China. It became an accepted military tactic in the Imperial Japanese Army, where numerically weaker Japanese forces, using their superior training and bayonets, were able to defeat larger Chinese forces. Due to the low standardisation of Chinese equipment in the National Revolutionary Army, the Japanese here seldom faced massed automatic weapons and more frequently encountered Chinese units armed only with bolt-action rifles, which could not fire as rapidly as a machine gun.

== World War II ==
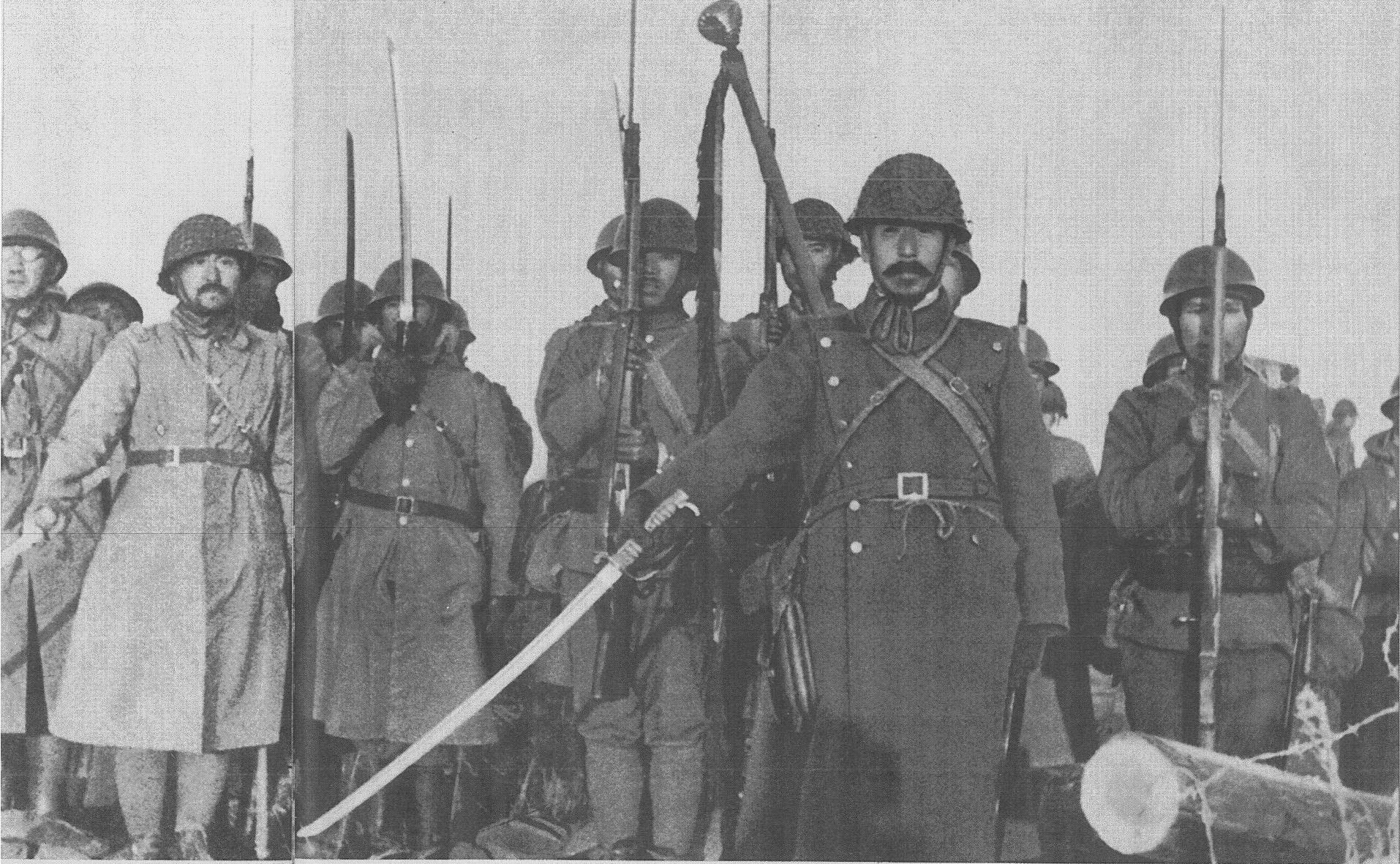
Japanese soldiers honor the Emperor with the shout "Banzai" during the Second Sino-Japanese War (1938).

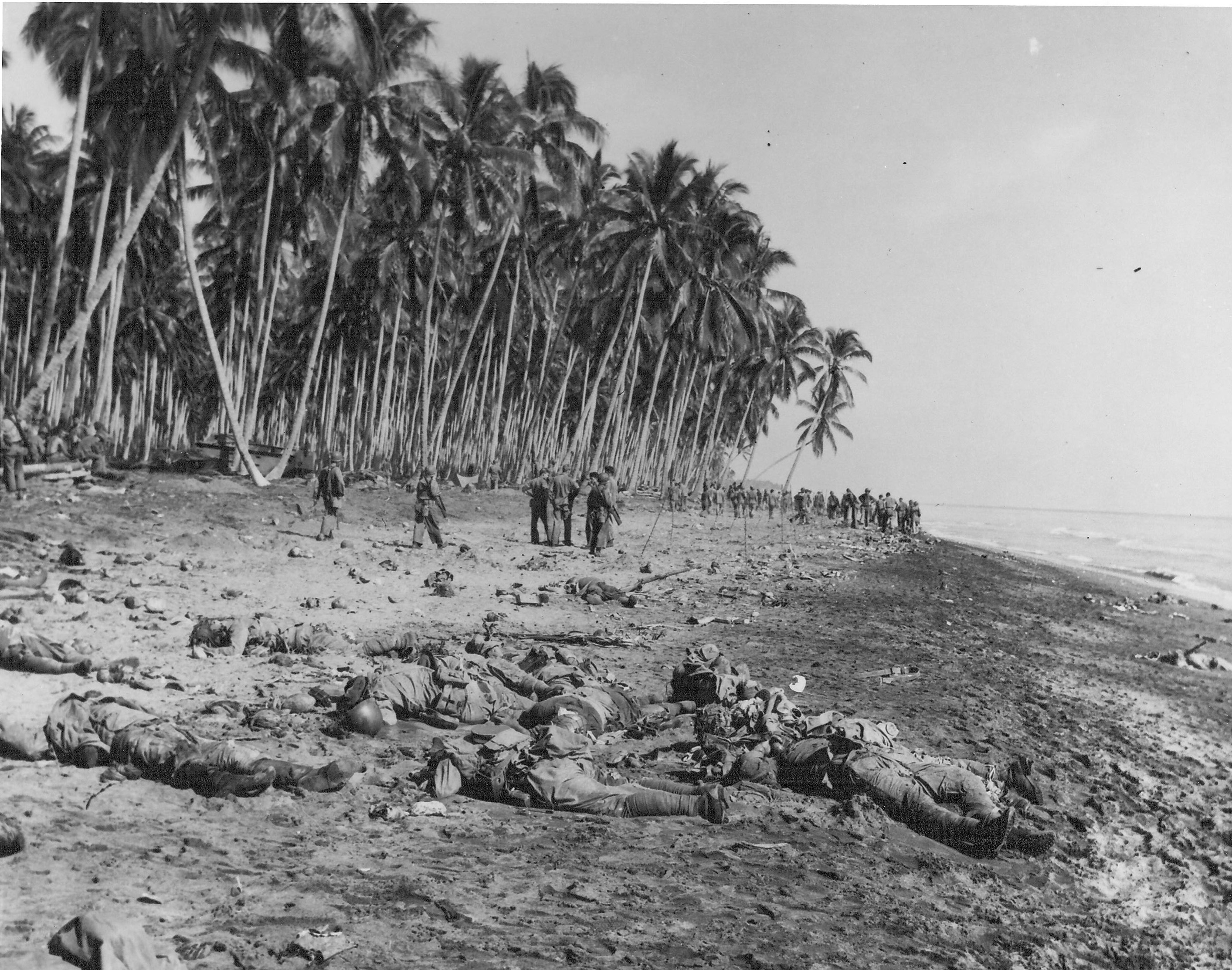
Imperial Japanese soldiers killed during banzai charges against a USMC position during the Battle of the Tenaru, Guadalcanal, 21 August 1942.

During World War II, the Japanese militarist government disseminated propaganda that romanticized suicide attacks, using one of the virtues of Bushido as the basis for the campaign. The Japanese government presented war as purifying, with death defined as a duty. By the end of 1944, the government announced the last protocol, unofficially named ichioku gyokusai (一億玉砕; literally '100 million shattered jewels'), implying the will to sacrifice the entire Japanese population if necessary, for the purpose of resisting opposition forces.

It was used extensively by the Japanese in China, especially against Chinese soldiers without machine guns or automatic weapons, though it was ineffective against those who had machine guns and more entrenched Chinese units.

During the U.S. raid on Makin Island, on August 17, 1942, the U.S. Marine Raiders attacking the island initially spotted and then killed Japanese machine gunners. The Japanese defenders then launched a banzai charge with bayonets and swords, but were stopped by American firepower. The pattern was repeated in further attacks, with similar results.

During the Guadalcanal campaign, on August 21, 1942, Colonel Kiyonao Ichiki led 800 soldiers in a direct attack on the American line guarding Henderson Field in the Battle of the Tenaru. After small-scale combat engagement in the jungle, Ichiki's army mounted a banzai charge on the enemy; however, against an organized American defense line, most of the Japanese soldiers were killed and Ichiki was himself killed although whether by suicide or American action is unclear.

On May 29, 1943, at the end of the Battle of Attu, the remaining Japanese on Attu Island, Alaska, led by Colonel Yasuyo Yamasaki, advanced on American lines near Massacre Bay. The Japanese force broke through the American front line and reached the rear echelon troops on Engineer Hill. In intense fighting which lasted all day, the Japanese force was wiped out. By the following day, only 28 remained of the Japanese force which had originally numbered roughly 2,600 - the rest having been killed in battle or committed suicide, while the Americans lost 549 combatants out of the 15,000 of the 7th Infantry Division which had landed to retake the island.

The largest banzai charge of the war took place during the Battle of Saipan. General Yoshitsugu Saitō gathered almost 4,300 Japanese soldiers, walking wounded, and some civilians, many unarmed, and ordered the charge. On July 7, 1944, it slammed directly into the Army's 1st and 2nd Battalions of the 105th Infantry Regiment, which lost almost 1,000 men killed and wounded in the 15-hour pitched battle. The attack was ultimately repelled and almost all the Japanese soldiers taking part in the charge were killed.

During the Soviet invasion of Manchuria, as the 1st Red Banner Army invaded Mutanchiang, the Soviet 5th Combined Arms Army to the south continued its advance westward, enveloping and destroying the Japanese 278th Infantry Regiment, the survivors of which mounted a last-ditch banzai charge rather than surrender. By the end of the day, all of Mutanchiang had fallen into Soviet hands, and the battle for the city was over. Shortly afterward, the main strength of the Kwantung Army laid down its arms in surrender as per Emperor Hirohito's broadcast. The Battle of Mutanchiang, and World War II, had come to an end.

During the Battle of Shumshu, the 11th Tank Regiment, consisting of Type 97 medium tanks, Type 97 medium tanks with a new turret (Chi-Ha), and Type 95 light tanks, worked in cooperation with the naval guard force's Type 2 internal combustion boats (Type 2 tanks). Around 6:50 a.m. on the 18th, the regiment’s commanding officer led a banzai charge against the Soviet forces on Mount Shirane and drove them back, then advanced further up the northern slope of Mount Shirane. The Soviet forces fiercely resisted by concentrating anti-tank weapons (4 anti-tank guns, about 100 anti-tank rifles, and anti-tank phosphorus grenades), destroying Japanese tanks one by one. However, after being hit by anti-aircraft fire from the Japanese forces stationed southeast of Mount Shirane and with reinforcements from the Independent Infantry Battalion 283 joining the fight, the Soviet forces retreated to the north side of Mount Shirane, leaving behind numerous abandoned bodies. The 11th Tank Regiment lost 27 tanks, and 97 soldiers, including Colonel Ikeda and many officers, were killed in action. The naval guard force's Type 2 internal combustion boats also suffered losses, but several remained, and after the war, they were captured by the Soviet forces and displayed at the Kubinka Tank Museum.

Some Japanese commanders, such as General Tadamichi Kuribayashi, forbade their men from carrying out banzai charges. Indeed, the Americans were surprised that the Japanese did not employ banzai charges at the Battle of Iwo Jima.

== See also ==
- Ten thousand years
- Banzai Cliff
- Suicide Cliff
- Siege of Port Arthur § Battle of 203 Meter Hill
- Kamikaze – aerial suicide attacks used by the Japanese in WWII
  - Japanese Special Attack Units
  - Smertnik
- Jibakutai
- Bayonet charge
- Highland charge
- Human wave attack
