= Special attack =

Special attack may refer to:

- Suicide attack, a deliberate attack in which the perpetrators intentionally end their own lives as part of the attack
  - Japanese Special Attack Units, specialized units of the Imperial Japanese Navy and Imperial Japanese Army, normally used for suicide missions and attacks
    - Kamikaze, a part of the Japanese Special Attack Units of military aviators who flew suicide attacks for the Empire of Japan against Allied naval vessels in the closing stages of the Pacific War
  - Sonderkommando Elbe, a World War II Luftwaffe task force assigned to bring down heavy bombers by ramming them in mid-air
- Special attack (video games), a feature of fighting games

== See also ==
- Attack (disambiguation)
