= List of Japanese loanwords in Indonesian =

Japanese is an East Asian language spoken by about 126 million people, primarily in Japan, where it is the official language and national language. The influx of Japanese loanwords can be classified into two periods, Japanese colonial administration period (1942–1945) and globalisation of Japanese popular culture (1980-now). As Indonesian is written using Latin script, Japanese romanisation systems influence the spelling in Indonesian.

== Spelling ==
=== Consonants ===
Consonants
Japanese IPA	Example, Hiragana	Example, Romanization	Indonesian IPA	Indonesian	Indonesian Example	Notes
b	ばしょ, かびん	basho, kabin	b	b	bola	
bʲ	びょうき	byōki	bʲ	by		
ç	ひと, ひょう	hito, hyō	h	h	habis, tokoh	
ɕ	した, いっしょう	shita, isshō	ʃ	sy	syarat	
ɕ	した, いっしょう	shita, isshō	ʃ	sh		
d	どうも, どうどう	dōmo, dōdō	d	d	dari	
dz	ずっと, ぜんぜん, キッズ	zutto, zenzen, kizzu	z	z	zaman	
z	あざ, つづく	aza, tsuzuku	z	z	zaman	
dʑ	じぶん, じょじょ, エッジ	jibun, jojo, ejji	dʒ	j	jari	
ʑ	みじかい, じょじょ	mijikai, jojo	dʒ	j	jari	
ɸ	ふじ	fuji	f	f	fikir, visa	
ɡ	がっこう, ごご, ぎんこう	gakkō, gogo, ginkō	ɡ	g	galah	
ɡʲ	きぎょう	kigyō	ɡʲ	gy		
h	ほん, はは	hon, haha	h	h	habis, tokoh	
j	やくしゃ, ゆゆしい	yakusha, yuyushii	j	y	yakin, kaya	
k	くる, はっき	kuru, hakki	k	k	kalah	
kʲ	きょうかい, けっきょく	kyōkai, kekkyoku	kʲ	ky		
m	みかん, せんぱい, もんもん	mikan, senpai, monmon	m	m	makan	
mʲ	みゃく	myaku	mʲ	my		
n	なっとう, かんたん	nattō, kantan	n	n	nakal	
ɲ	にわ, こんにゃく, きんちょう	niwa, konnyaku, kinchō	ɲ	ny	nyaman	
ŋ	りんご, なんきょく	ringo, nankyoku	ŋ	ng	ngarai	
ɴ	にほん	nihon	n	n	nakal	
p	パン, たんぽぽ	pan, tampopo	p	p	pola	
pʲ	はっぴょう	happyō	pʲ	py		
ɾ	ろく, そら	roku, sora	r	r	raja, dari, pasar	
ɾʲ	りょうり	ryōri	rʲ	ry		
s	する, さっそう	suru, sassō	s	s	saya	
t	たべる, とって	taberu, totte	t	t	tari	
ts	つなみ, いっつい	tsunami, ittsui	s	ts		
ts	つなみ, いっつい	tsunami, ittsui	ʃ	ts		
tɕ	ちかい, けっちゃく	chikai, ketchaku	tʃ	c	cari	
ɰ	わさび	wasabi	w	w	waktu, Jawa	
ɰ̃	ふんいき, でんわ, あんしん	fun'iki, denwa, anshin	n	n	nakal	
ʔ	あつっ！	atsu'!	ʔ	k	bapak, rakyat	

=== Vowels ===
Most vowels are retained without significant change in Indonesian, except in vowels length and pitch accent (there are no vowels length distinction and no pitch accent in Indonesian).

Vowels
Japanese IPA	Hiragana	Transliteration	Indonesian IPA	Indonesian Transliteration
a	あ	a	a	a
e	え	e	e	é
e	え	e	ɛ	è
i	い	i	i	i
i̥	い	i	i	i
o	お	o	o	o
ɯ	う	u	u	u
ɯ̥	う	u	u	u

== Loanwords ==
=== A ===
Indonesian Word	Indonesian Meaning	Japanese New Form	Japanese Old Form	Japanese Transliteration	Japanese Meaning	Note	Ref
aikido	aikido	合気道	合氣道	aikidō	aikido		
ajinomoto	flavour enhancer	味の素	味の素	ajinomoto	ajinomoto	the trademarked product name for monosodium glutamate (MSG), a flavour enhancer, held by Ajinomoto Co.	
anata	second-person pronoun	あなた	あなた	anata	second-person pronoun		
anata	second-person pronoun	貴方	貴方	anata	second-person pronoun		
anata	second-person pronoun	貴女	貴女	anata	second-person pronoun		
anata	second-person pronoun	貴男	貴男	anata	second-person pronoun		
animé	anime	アニメ	アニメ	anime	animation	contraction from アニメーション (animēshon), a loanword from English for animation	
arigato	thank you	ありがとう	ありがとう	arigatō	thank you		
arigato	thank you	有り難う	有り難う	arigatō	thank you		
arigato	thank you	有難う	有難う	arigatō	thank you		
aza	hamlet	字	字	aza	a section of a village		

=== B ===
Indonesian Word	Indonesian Meaning	Japanese New Form	Japanese Old Form	Japanese Transliteration	Japanese Meaning	Note	Ref
bakéro	stupid, Japanese swear word	ばかやろう	ばかやろう	bakayarō	stupid	1. see baka.; 2. also variously written as バカやろう, バカヤロウ, バカヤロオ and バカヤロー.; 3. ultimately from Portuguese vaqueiro or Spanish vaquero	
bakéro	stupid, Japanese swear word	馬鹿野郎	馬鹿野郎	bakayarō	stupid	1. see baka.; 2. also variously written as バカやろう, バカヤロウ, バカヤロオ and バカヤロー.; 3. ultimately from Portuguese vaqueiro or Spanish vaquero	
banggo	number	番号	番號	bangō	number	(Military-related term)	
banzai	long life cheers	万歳	萬歲	banzai	long life cheers	lit. "ten thousand years," such as 天皇陛下万歳 (Tennōheika Banzai!) "Long live His Majesty the Emperor"	
bento	bento	弁当	辨當	bento	lunch box		
bogodan	Japanese police assistant in Sumatra	防護団	防護團	bōgodan	protection + unit	(Military-related term)	
bokugo	air-raid shelter	防空壕	防空壕	bōkūgō	air-raid shelter	(Military-related term)	
boshi	hat, cap	帽子	帽子	bōshi	hat, cap	(Military-related term)	
bonsai	miniature potted plant	盆栽	盆栽	bonsai	tray plantting, bonsai		
buco	departmental head	部長	部長	buchō	departmental head		
budan	platoon	分団	分團	budan	platoon	(Military-related term) 分隊 (buntai) = platoon	
budanco	platoon commander	分団長	分團長	budanchō	platoon commander	(Military-related term) 分隊 (buntai) = platoon	
bupin	goods, material	物品	物品	buppin	goods, material	(Military-related term)	
bushido	bushido	武士道	武士道	bushidō	bushido	(Military-related term) 1. way of warrior, 2. code of conduct for Japanese samurai	
butai	troops, a unit	部隊	部隊	butai	troops, a unit	(Military-related term)	

=== C ===
Indonesian Word	Indonesian Meaning	Japanese New Form	Japanese Old Form	Japanese Transliteration	Japanese Meaning	Note	Ref
canoyu	Japanese tea ceremony	茶の湯	茶の湯	chanoyu	tea ceremony	The Japanese tea ceremony, also called the Way of Tea, is a Japanese cultural activity involving the ceremonial preparation and presentation of matcha (抹茶), powdered green tea.	
cudan	company	中団	中團	chūdan	company	(Military-related term)	
cudanco	company commander	中団長	中團長	chūdanchō	company commander	(Military-related term)	
cugako	junior high school	中学校	中學校	chūgakkō	junior high school		
cusetsu	submission to the fatherland	忠節	忠節	chūsetsu	loyalty; allegiance; fidelity	(Military-related term)	
cuto	secondary, intermediate	中等	中等	chūtō	medium, middle		

=== D ===
Indonesian Word	Indonesian Meaning	Japanese New Form	Japanese Old Form	Japanese Transliteration	Japanese Meaning	Note	Ref
dai	great, large	大	大	dai	great, large	such as 大日本 (dai nippon)	
daidan	battalion	大団	大團	daidan	battalion		
daidanco	battalion commander	大団長	大團長	daidanchō	battalion commander		
daihonéi	imperial headquarter	大本営	大本營	daihonei	imperial headquarter	(Military-related term)	
dakocan	air-filled black plastic dolls	ダッコ -ちゃん	ダッコ -ちゃん	dakko-chan	a mascot	the company mascot of Takara	
dan	rank for judo, karate, and kenpo	段	段	dan	dan, an East Asia ranking system		
dan	unit	団	團	dan	unit		
danco	unit commander	団長	團長	danchō	unit commander		
dohyo	dohyō	土俵	土俵	dohyō	dohyō	dohyō, sumo ring	
dokuritsu	independence	独立	獨立	dokuritsu	independence, separation	such as in Badan Penyelidik Usaha Persiapan Kemerdekaan Indonesia (独立準備調査会, Dokuritsu Junbi Chōsa-kai) and Panitia Persiapan Kemerdekaan Indonesia (独立準備委員会, Dokuritsu Junbi Inkai)	
doméi	dōmei	同盟	同盟	dōmei	union, alliance	shorthand of 同盟通信社 (dōmei tsūshinsha, lit. Federated News Agency) Imperial Japanese News Agency	
dojo	dojo	道場	道場	dōjō	dojo	karate training place	
doyo	dojo	道場	道場	dōjō	dojo	karate training place	

=== E ===
Indonesian Word	Indonesian Meaning	Japanese New Form	Japanese Old Form	Japanese Transliteration	Japanese Meaning	Note	Ref
ebi	dried shrimp	えび	えび	ebi	prawn, shrimp, lobster, crayfish		
ebi	dried shrimp	蝦	蝦	ebi	prawn, shrimp, lobster, crayfish		
ebi	dried shrimp	海老	海老	ebi	prawn, shrimp, lobster, crayfish		
éisé	hygiene, health	衛生	衛生	eisei	hygiene, sanitary, health		
emoji	Japanese emoticon, emoji	絵文字	繪文字	emoji	emoji	Emoji are ideograms and smileys used in electronic messages and web pages.	
éndaka	strong yen	円高	圓高	endaka	strong yen		
énsyu	practice, training	演習	演習	enshū	exercise, drill, practice		

=== F ===
Indonesian Word	Indonesian Meaning	Japanese New Form	Japanese Old Form	Japanese Transliteration	Japanese Meaning	Note	Ref
fujinkai	women association	婦人会	婦人會	fujinkai	women association		
fukan	adjutant	副官	副官	fukkan	adjutant, aide-de-camp	Adjutant is a military appointment given to an officer who assists the commanding officer with unit administration.	
fungkaico	assistant chairperson	副会長	副會長	fukukaichou	assistant chairperson		
fusimban	night guard	不寝番	不寢番	fushinban	night watch; vigilance		

=== G ===
Indonesian Word	Indonesian Meaning	Japanese New Form	Japanese Old Form	Japanese Transliteration	Japanese Meaning	Note	Ref
gakari	duty	係	係	kakari	(person in) charge, duty	through rendaku form -gakari	
gakari	duty	掛	掛	kakari	(person in) charge, duty	through rendaku form -gakari	
gako	school	学校	學校	gakko	school		
gakutotai	student militia	学徒隊	學徒隊	gakutotai	student militia	(Military-related term)	
geisha	geisha	芸者	藝者	geisha	geisha	traditional Japanese female entertainer	
génjumin	native (pejorative)	原住民	原住民	genjūmin	aborigine	sensitive. 先住民 is more acceptable.	
gigaku	gigaku	伎楽	伎樂	gigaku	gigaku	Gigaku refers to an extinct genre of masked drama-dance performance, imported into Japan during the Asuka period.	
giyugun	Pembela Tanah Air	義勇軍	義勇軍	giyūgun	volunteer army	see Pembela Tanah Air (郷土防衛義勇軍, kyōdo bōei giyūgun)	
giyuhéi	volunteer	義勇兵	義勇兵	giyūhei	volunteer soldier		
go	go	囲碁	圍碁	i-go	go	Go is an abstract strategy board game for two players, in which the aim is to surround more territory than the opponent.	
gobo	Arctium lappa	牛蒡	牛蒡	gobō	Arctium lappa		
gobo	Arctium lappa	ゴボウ	ゴボウ	gobō	Arctium lappa		
gongyo	buddhist liturgy	勤行	勤行	gon-gyō	buddhist liturgy		
gun	district	郡	郡	gun	district	see Administrative divisions of Japan	
gunco	district chief (wedana)	郡長	郡長	gunchō	district chief	see Administrative divisions of Japan	
gunséibu	Japanese military administration	軍政部	軍政部	gunseibu	military government	refers to Japanese occupation of the Dutch East Indies	
gunseikan	Japanese military government (chief)	軍政官	軍政官	gunseikan	military government official	refers to Japanese occupation of the Dutch East Indies	
gunsyiréikan	army commander	軍司令官	軍司令官	gunshireikan	army commander	(Military-related term)	

=== H ===
Indonesian Word	Indonesian Meaning	Japanese New Form	Japanese Old Form	Japanese Transliteration	Japanese Meaning	Note	Ref
haiku	haiku	俳句	俳句	haiku	haiku	Haiku (俳句) is a very short Japan poem with seventeen syllables and three verses.	
hakugékiho	trench mortar	迫撃砲	迫撃砲	hakugekihō	mortar	(Military-related term)	
hanco	squad leader	班長	班長	hanchō	squad leader	(Military-related term)	
hanséi	reflection, reconsideration	反省	反省	hansei	reflection, reconsideration		
harakiri	harakiri	腹切	腹切	harakiri	harakiri	Seppuku, sometimes referred to as harakiri, is a form of Japanese ritual suicide by disembowelment.	
hayabusa	type of Japanese warplane	隼	隼	hayabusa	peregrine falcon	(Military-related term)	
heiho	Japanese colonial auxiliaries	兵補	兵補	heiho	auxiliaries		
hentai	1. pornographic (adj.); 2. pornographic anime, manga or Japanese computer game.	変態	變態	hentai	1. metamorphosis, transformation 2. abnormality 3. pervert, hentai	1. Pervert meaning in Japanese based on contraction of 変態性欲 (hentai seiyoku, lit. perverse sexual desire).; 2. The original meaning in the Japanese language is transformation or metamorphosis.	
hikoki	aeroplane	飛行機	飛行機	hikōki	aeroplane		
hinomaru	national flag of Japan	日の丸	日の丸	hinomaru	national flag of Japan		
hiragana	hiragana	平仮名	平仮名	hiragana	hiragana	Hiragana is a Japanese syllabary.	
hiragana	hiragana	ひらがな	ひらがな	hiragana	hiragana	Hiragana is a Japanese syllabary.	
hokokai	Japanese colonial mobilisation group	奉公会	奉公會	hōkōkai	public service association	such as Jawa Hokokai.	
honbu	headquarters	本部	本部	honbu	headquarters		
honda	moped, autocycle; pickup truck	本田	本田	honda	Honda, name of vehicle manufacturer.		
hoso kyoku	broadcasting station	放送局	放送局	hōsōkyoku	broadcasting station		

=== I ===
Indonesian Word	Indonesian Meaning	Japanese New Form	Japanese Old Form	Japanese Transliteration	Japanese Meaning	Note	Ref
iaido	iaido	居合道	居合道	iaidō	iaido	Iaidō (居合道), abbreviated with iai (居合), is a Japanese martial art that emphasizes being aware and capable of quickly drawing the sword and responding to a sudden attack.	
iaidoka	iaido practitioner	居合道家	居合道家	iaidōka	iaido practitioner		
ici	one	一	一	ichi	one		
iciban	most	一番	一番	ichiban	most		
ikebana	ikebana	生花	生花	ikebana	ikebana	Ikebana (生け花, "living flowers") is the Japanese art of flower arrangement.	
ipon	crushing victory	一本	一本	ippon	1. one point, 2. a blow	see ippon	

=== J ===
Indonesian Word	Indonesian Meaning	Japanese New Form	Japanese Old Form	Japanese Transliteration	Japanese Meaning	Note	Ref
jibaku, berjibaku	1. suicide bomber 2. reckless, desperate attack	自爆	自爆	jibaku	suicide bombing, self-destruction	1. see also kamikaze.; 2. Common use with prefix ber- in form of berjibaku.	
jibakutai	suicide squad	自爆隊	自爆隊	jibakutai	suicide squad		
jinci	fortification, position	陣地	陣地	jinchi	encampment, position		
johobu	intelligence section	情報部	情報部	jōhōbu	1. information bureau, 2. intelligence department		
joto	first class	上等	上等	jōtō	first class		
ju	rifle, gun	銃	銃	jū	gun		
judo	judo	柔道	柔道	jūdō	judo	Judo (柔道 jūdō, meaning "gentle way") was created as a physical, mental and moral pedagogy in Japan, in 1882, by Jigoro Kano (嘉納治五郎). Its most prominent feature is its competitive element, where the objective is to either throw or takedown an opponent to the ground, immobilize or otherwise subdue an opponent with a pin, or force an opponent to submit with a joint lock or a choke.	
judogi	judo uniform	柔道着	柔道着	jūdōki	judo uniform		
judoka	judo practitioner	柔道家	柔道家	jūdōka	judo practitioner		
judokang	judo hall	柔道館	柔道館	jūdōkan	judo hall		
jugun-ianfu	comfort women	従軍慰安婦	從軍慰安婦	jūgun-ianfu	comfort women		
jujitsu	jujutsu	柔術	柔術	jujutsu	jujutsu	see also yuyitsu.	
juki	rifle, firearm; heavy machine-gun	銃器		jūki	small arms		
jukikanju	heavy machine-gun	重機関銃		jūkikanjū	heavy machine gun		
jukén	bayonet	銃剣	銃劍	jūken	bayonet		

=== K ===
Indonesian Word	Indonesian Meaning	Japanese New Form	Japanese Old Form	Japanese Transliteration	Japanese Meaning	Note	Ref
kabuki	kabuki	歌舞伎	歌舞伎	kabuki	kabuki	A form of Japanese theatre in which elaborately costumed male performers use stylized movements, dances, and songs in order to enact tragedies and comedies.	
kaigun	navy	海軍	海軍	kaigun	navy		
kaitén	human (suicide) torpedo	回天	回天	kaiten	torpedo modified as a suicide weapon		
kamikazé	1. divine wind (typhoon), 2. suicide attacks by military aviators from Japan in World War 2	神風	神風	kamikaze	1. divine wind, 2. suicide attacks by military aviators from Japan in World War 2		
kampai	lie supine, stretched out, irregular, powerless	完敗	完敗	kanpai	complete defeat, utter defeat, annihilation		
kanji	kanji	漢字	漢字	kanji	kanji	1. Kanji (漢字) are the adopted logographic Chinese characters that are used in the Japanese writing system.; 2. see also Honji, from Chinese	
karakuri	karakuri, machine mechanism	絡繰り	絡繰り	karakuri	karakuri (lit. mechanism)		
karaoke	karaoke	空オケ	空オケ	karaoke	karaoke	clipped compound of 空 (kara) empty and orchestra.	
karate	karate	空手	空手	karate	karate		
karate	karate	唐手	唐手	karate	karate		
karategi	karate uniform	空手着	空手着	karateki	karate uniform		
karategi	karate uniform	唐手着	唐手着	karateki	karate uniform		
karateka	karate practitioner	空手家	空手家	karateka	karate practitioner		
karateka	karate practitioner	唐手家	唐手家	karateka	karate practitioner		
kata	kata	型	型	kata	kata	Kata are detailed choreographed patterns of movements practiced either solo or in pairs.	
kata	kata	形	形	kata	kata	Kata are detailed choreographed patterns of movements practiced either solo or in pairs.	
kéibitai	guard troops, garrison unit	警備隊	警備隊	keibitai	guard troops, garrison unit		
kéibodan	Japanese colonial police assistant	警防団	警防團	keibōdan	civil defense unit		
kéiri	finance	経理	經理	keiri	finance		
kéiréi	salute	敬礼	敬禮	keirei	salute		
kéisatsu	police	警察	警察	keisatsu	police		
kéisatsutai	police force	警察隊	警察隊	keisatsutai	police force		
keki	light machine gun	軽機	輕機	keiki	light machine gun		
kémpého	kempeitai auxiliaries	憲兵補	憲兵補	kenpeiho	kempeitai auxiliaries		
kémpétai	Japanese military police	憲兵隊	憲兵隊	kenpeitai	kempeitai	1. The Kenpeitai (憲兵隊, "Military Police Corps") was the military police arm of the Imperial Japanese Army from 1881 to 1945.; 2. current Japan military police is called 警務隊 (keimutai)	
ken	fist, clench	拳	拳	ken	fist, clench		
ken	regency (large district)	県	縣	ken	1. prefecture (of Japan), 2. county (of China)	see Administrative divisions of Japan	
kenco	regent (large district)	県長	縣長	kenchō	1. prefecture (of Japan), head of, 2. county (of China), head of	see Administrative divisions of Japan	
kèndo	kendo	剣道	劍道	kendō	kendo	lit. sword way	
kénpéi	military police	憲兵	憲兵	kenpei	military police		
kénpéitaico	head of kempeitai	憲兵隊長	憲兵隊長	kenpeitaichō	head of kempeitai		
kenpo, kempo	kenpō	拳法	拳法	kenpō	kenpō	lit. fist method	
kiai	kiai	気合	氣合	kiai	kiai	Kiai is a Japanese term used in martial arts for the short yell or shout uttered when performing an attacking move.	
kidobutai	special task force	機動部隊	機動部隊	kidōbutai	mobile troops; mechanized unit		
kimigayo	kimigayo, national anthem of Japan	君が代	君が代	kimigayo	kimigayo, national anthem of Japan		
kimono	1. Japanese traditional dress, 2. Bathrobe	着物	着物	kimono	1. cloth 2. kimono		
kinrohosyi	labour service	勤労奉仕	勤勞奉仕	kinrōhōshi	labour service		
kiotsuké	attention!	気を付け	気を付け	kiwotsuke	attention!		
koo	term of address for a sultan, prince, etc.	侯	侯	kō	marquis, lord, daimyo, prince		
koo	term of address for a sultan, prince, etc.	公	公	kō	marquis, lord, daimyo, prince		
kooa	cigarettes	興亜	興亜	kōa	Asia development		
koci	special area, principality	侯地	侯地	kōchi	"marquis, lord, daimyo, prince"+land		
koci	special area, principality	公地	公地	kōchi	"marquis, lord, daimyo, prince"+land		
kodo	imperial rule	皇道	皇道	kōdō	imperial rule	Imperial means Empire of Japan	
kodomo	children	子供	子供	kodomo	children		
koi	koi carp	鯉	鯉	koi	carp		
kokang	bolt lever of a rifle	鋼管	鋼管	kōkan	steel pipe		
kotai	change, relief (of guard) (mil.)	交代	交代	kōtai	alternation, change, relief, relay, shift, substitution		
kotai	change, relief (of guard) (mil.)	交替	交替	kōtai	alternation, change, relief, relay, shift, substitution		
koto	high	高等	高等	kōtō	high class		
kotsubu	registration of motor vehicles department	皇道部	皇道部	kōtsūbu	transportation department		
kozan	mine	鉱山	鉱山	kōzan	mine		
ku	sub-district	区	區	ku	ward, district	see Administrative divisions of Japan	
kuco	head of sub-district	区長	區長	kuchō	head of ward, district	see Administrative divisions of Japan	
kumiai	association, union	組合	組合	kumiai	association, union		
kumico	people association leader	組長	組長	kumichō	association leader		
kyoikutai	education branch	教育隊	教育隊	kyōikutai	education unit		
kyorén	training, instruction	教練	教練	kyōren	drill		

=== M ===
Indonesian Word	Indonesian Meaning	Japanese New Form	Japanese Old Form	Japanese Transliteration	Japanese Meaning	Note	Ref
manga	manga, Japanese-style comics	漫画	漫畫	manga	manga, refer to cartooning, comics, and animation	1. lit. impromptu sketches 2. sometimes, manga-influenced comics, such as Chinese manhua (漫畫, 漫画) and Korean manhwa (만화), are included in.	
mangaka	mangaka	漫画家	漫畫家	mangaka	manga artist	Mangaka is the Japanese word for manga artist.	
mikado	Emperor of Japan	御門	御門	mikado	Emperor of Japan	The literal meaning of 御門 is "the honorable gate", that is, the gate of the Japanese imperial palace.	
minséibu	civil administration department	民生部	民生部	minseibu	civil administration department		
minséifu	civil administration department (naval zone)	民生府	民生府	minseifu	civil administration		
mirin	mirin	味醂	味醂	mirin	mirin	Mirin (味醂 or みりん) is an essential condiment used in Japanese cuisine from a type of rice wine similar to sake, but with a lower alcohol content and higher sugar content.	
mitamasyiro	spirit substitute	御霊代	御霊代	mitamashiro	spirit substitute		
moci	mochi	餅	餅	mochi	mochi	Mochi (Japanese: 餅, もち) is Japanese rice cake made of mochigome, a short-grain japonica glutinous rice.	
mocitsuki	mochi preparation for Japanese new year	餅搗き	餅搗き	mochitsuki	mochi preparation for Japanese new year		
mokto	silent prayer	黙祷	默禱	mokutō	silent prayer		
mokuju	wooden gun, rifle	木銃	木銃	mokujū	wooden gun		

=== N ===
Indonesian Word	Indonesian Meaning	Japanese New Form	Japanese Old Form	Japanese Transliteration	Japanese Meaning	Note	Ref
naimubu	internal affairs department	内務部	内務部	naimubu	internal affairs department		
nansyinron	nanshin-ron	南進論	南進論	nanshin-ron	nanshin-ron	The Southern Expansion Doctrine (南進論 Nanshin-ron) was a political doctrine in the Empire of Japan which stated that Southeast Asia and the Pacific Islands were Japan's sphere of interest and that the potential value to the Japanese Empire for economic and territorial expansion in those areas was greater than elsewhere.	
nanyo	nanyang	南洋	南洋	nanyō	nanyang	Nanyang is a sinocentric Chinese term for the warmer and fertile geographical region south of China, otherwise known as the 'South Sea' or Southeast Asia.	
naoré	eyes front!	名折れ	名折れ	naore	blot; disgrace; dishonor		
nikkeiren	Japanese labour union	日経連	日経連	nikkeiren	Japan Federation of Employers' Associations	Nikkeiren is short form of Japan Federation of Employers' Associations (日本経営者団体連盟) which merged into Japan Business Federation.	
ninja	1. ninja.; 2. Unidentified killer with black clothes and mask	忍者	忍者	ninja	ninja	A ninja (忍者) or shinobi (忍び) was a covert agent or mercenary in feudal Japan.	
noh	noh	能	能	nō	noh	Noh (能 Nō), derived from the Sino-Japanese word for "skill" or "talent", is a major form of classical Japanese musical drama that has been performed since the 14th century.	
nipon, nippon	Japan	日本	日本	nippon	Japan	nippon is more related to World War II and before; current reading prefers nihon than nippon.	
nipongo	Japanese language	日本語	日本語	nippongo	Japanese language		
niponjin	Japanese people	日本人	日本人	nipponjin	Japanese people		
niponséishin	Japanese spirit	日本精神	日本精神	nipponseishin	Japanese spirit		
nogyo kumiai	agricultural cooperative	農業組合	農業組合	nōgyō kumiai	agricultural cooperative		
nori	nori	海苔	海苔	nori	nori		

=== O ===
Indonesian Word	Indonesian Meaning	Japanese New Form	Japanese Old Form	Japanese Transliteration	Japanese Meaning	Note	Ref
obi	obi	帯	帶	obi	obi	Obi is a sash for traditional Japanese dress, keikogi (uniforms for Japanese martial arts), and part of kimono outfits.	
okura	okra	オクラ	オクラ	okura	okra		
okura	okra	秋葵	秋葵	okura	okra		
onagata	male actor in female kabuki roles	女形	女形	onnagata	male actor in female kabuki roles		
onagata	male actor in female kabuki roles	女方	女方	onnagata	male actor in female kabuki roles		
onigiri	onigiri	御握	御握	onigiri	onigiri	Onigiri, also known as o-musubi, nigirimeshi or rice ball, is a Japanese food made from white rice formed into triangular or cylindrical shapes and often wrapped in nori (seaweed).	
onsèn	onsen	温泉	溫泉	onsen	onsen	An onsen (温泉) is a Japanese hot spring; the term also extends to cover the bathing facilities and traditional inns frequently situated around a hot spring.	
origami	origami	折紙	折紙	origami	origami	Origami is the art of paper folding, which is often associated with Japanese culture.	
oritsuru	crane-shaped origami	折鶴	折鶴	oriduru	crane-shaped origami	In Japanese, rendaku is applied so ori+tsuru changed into oriduru, while Indonesian kept non-rendaku pronunciation.	

=== P ===
Indonesian Word	Indonesian Meaning	Japanese New Form	Japanese Old Form	Japanese Transliteration	Japanese Meaning	Note	Ref
panko	bread crumbs	パン粉	パン粉	panko	bread crumbs	Panko (パン粉) is a variety of flaky bread crumb used in Japanese cuisine as a crunchy coating for fried foods, such as tonkatsu.	
pesinban	night guard	不寝番	不寢番	fushinban	night watch; vigilance		

=== R ===
Indonesian Word	Indonesian Meaning	Japanese New Form	Japanese Old Form	Japanese Transliteration	Japanese Meaning	Note	Ref
ramen	ramen	ラーメン	拉麵	ramen	soup noodle	~~a kind of Japanese-style soup noodle originated from China~~	
rengo	trade union	連合	連合	rengo	RENGO	RENGO (連合 Rengō), which stands for Japanese Trade Union Confederation (日本労働組合総連合会 Nihon Rōdōkumiai Sōrengōkai), is a national trade union center in Japan.	
rénséitai	training units	錬成隊	錬成隊	renseitai	training units		
rénséitai	training units	練成隊	練成隊	renseitai	training units		
rikugun	army	陸軍	陸軍	rikugun	army		
romukyokai	rōmusha recruitment committee	労務協会	勞務協會	rōmukyōkai	rōmusha committee	see Rōmusha (労務者).	
romusa, romusha, romusya	rōmusha	労務者	勞務者	rōmusha	rōmusha	Rōmusha (労務者) is a Japanese language word for "laborer", but has come to specifically denote forced laborers during the Japanese occupation of Indonesia in World War II.	

=== S ===
Indonesian Word	Indonesian Meaning	Japanese New Form	Japanese Old Form	Japanese Transliteration	Japanese Meaning	Note	Ref
sabo	erosion, sedimentation, landslide control system	砂防	砂防	sabō	erosion control		
saikosyikikan	Commander-in-chief	最高指揮官	最高指揮官	saikōshikikan	Commander-in-chief		
sake	sake	酒	酒	sake	sake	Sake, Japanese rice wine, is made by fermenting rice that has been polished to remove the bran.	
sakura	cherry blossom	桜	櫻	sakura	cherry blossom	A cherry blossom is the flower of any of several trees of genus Prunus, particularly the Japanese cherry, Prunus serrulata, which is called sakura after the Japanese (桜 or 櫻; さくら).	
samurai	samurai	侍	侍	samurai	samurai	Samurai (侍) were the military nobility and officer caste of medieval and early-modern Japan.	
sangyobu	industrial department	産業部	産業部	sangyōbu	industrial department		
sashimi	sashimi	刺身	刺身	sashimi	sashimi	Sashimi is a Japanese delicacy consisting of very fresh raw meat or fish sliced into thin pieces.	
satori	free from discrimination condition	悟り	悟り	satori	1. comprehension, understanding 2. enlightenment (Buddhism)		
satori	free from discrimination condition	覚り	覚り	satori	1. comprehension, understanding 2. enlightenment (Buddhism)		
sayonara	good bye	さようなら	さようなら	sayōnara	formal, final good bye		
seikeirei	profound obeisance	最敬礼	最敬礼	saikeirei	a low, deep bow, a respectful bow		
seko	observer, scout, spy	斥候	斥候	sekkō	scout, patrol, spy		
sendenbu	Japanese colonial propaganda office	宣伝部	宣伝部	sendenbu	public relation departement		
sensei	Japanese teacher, including Japanese martial arts teacher	先生	先生	sensei	elder, scholar, teacher, doctor	see also sinse, Chinese loanword.	
seinendan	Japanese colonial youth association	青年団	青年團	seinendan	youth association	青年 (seinen) = youth.	
shinkansen	1. high-speed passenger train, bullet train 2. shinkansen	新幹線	新幹線	shinkansen	shinkansen	The Shinkansen, means new trunkline or new main line, colloquially known in English as the bullet train, is a network of high-speed railway lines in Japan.	
Shinto	shinto	神道	神道	shintō	shinto	Shinto is the traditional religion of Japan that focuses on ritual practices to be carried out diligently to establish a connection between present-day Japan and its ancient past.	
soba	soba, a buckwheat noodle	蕎麦	蕎麦	soba	1. buckwheat, 2. buckwheat noodle		
Son Goku	Son Goku	孫悟空	孫悟空	Son Gokū	Sun Wukong, Goku	see also Sun Go Kong from Chinese.	
sogi	shogi	将棋	將棋	shōgi	shogi	Shogi, also known as Japanese chess or the Game of Generals, is a two-player strategy board game native to Japan in the same family as chess.	
sogo	1. a giant trading company whose sales in retail, 2. Sogo, departement store chain	そごう	そごう	sogō	Sogo, a department store chain	Sogo is department store chain which was founded Ihei Sogo (十合 伊兵衛, Sogou Ihei).	
soroban	soroban	算盤	算盤	soroban	soroban	The soroban (算盤, そろばん, counting tray) is an abacus developed in Japan. see suanpan, Chinese loanword.	
somubu	general affairs department	総務部	総務部	sōmubu	general affairs department		
subuco	Japanese colonial officer	候部長	候部長	subucho	head of auxiliary departement		
sudoku	sudoku	数独	數獨	sūdoku	sudoku	Sudoku (数独 sūdoku, digit-single) ( originally called Number Place) is a logic-based, combinatorial number-placement puzzle.	
suiseki	suiseki	水石	水石	suiseki	suiseki	Suiseki (水石) are small naturally occurring or shaped rocks which are traditionally appreciated.	
sukiyaki	sukiyaki	鋤焼	鋤燒	sukiyaki	sukiyaki	Sukiyaki is a Japanese dish that is prepared and served in the nabemono (Japanese hot pot) style.	
sukiyaki	sukiyaki	すき焼き		sukiyaki	sukiyaki	Sukiyaki is a Japanese dish that is prepared and served in the nabemono (Japanese hot pot) style.	
sumubu	religious affairs department	宗務部	宗務部	shūmubu	religious affairs department		
susyi	sushi	すし	すし	sushi	sushi	Sushi is a Japanese dish of specially prepared vinegared rice (鮨飯 sushi-meshi), usually with some sugar and salt, combined with a variety of ingredients (ネタ neta), such as seafood, vegetables, and occasionally tropical fruits.	
susyi	sushi	寿司	寿司	sushi	sushi	Sushi is a Japanese dish of specially prepared vinegared rice (鮨飯 sushi-meshi), usually with some sugar and salt, combined with a variety of ingredients (ネタ neta), such as seafood, vegetables, and occasionally tropical fruits.	
susyi	sushi	鮨	鮨	sushi	sushi	Sushi is a Japanese dish of specially prepared vinegared rice (鮨飯 sushi-meshi), usually with some sugar and salt, combined with a variety of ingredients (ネタ neta), such as seafood, vegetables, and occasionally tropical fruits.	
sumo	sumo	相撲	相撲	sumō	sumo	Sumo (wrestling) is a competitive full-contact wrestling sport where a rikishi (wrestler) attempts to force another wrestler out of a circular ring (dohyō) or into touching the ground with anything other than the soles of his feet.	
syi	municipality	市	市	shi	municipality		
syico	mayor	市長	市長	shichō	mayor		
syihobu	judicial affairs department	司法部	司法部	shihōbu	judicial affairs department		
syodanco	platoon commander	小団長	小團長	shōdanchō	platoon commander		
syogun, shogun	shōgun	将軍	将軍	shōgun	shōgun	The shōgun was the military dictator of Japan during the period from 1185 to 1868 (with exceptions).	
syu	residency	州	州	shū	state		
syuco	resident; residency	州長	州長	shūchō			
syucokan	resident; administrator	州長官	州長官	shūchōkan			
syurikèn	shuriken	手裏剣	手裏劍	shuriken	shuriken	A shuriken (Japanese 手裏剣; literally: "hidden hand blade") is a Japanese concealed weapon that was used as a hidden dagger to distract or misdirect.	

=== T ===
Indonesian Word	Indonesian Meaning	Japanese New Form	Japanese Old Form	Japanese Transliteration	Japanese Meaning	Note	Ref
taico	unit commander	隊長	隊長	taichō	leader, captain		
taiho	gun, cannon	大砲	大砲	taihō	gun, cannon		
taikén	sword-armed	帯剣	帶劍	taiken	sword-armed		
taisa	colonel	大佐	大佐	taisa	colonel		
taiso	Japanese gymnastics	体操	體操	taisho	gymnastics, physical exercises, calisthenics		
takeyari	bamboo spear	竹槍	竹槍	takeyori	bamboo spear		
takoyaki	takoyaki	たこ焼き		takoyaki	takoyaki	Takoyaki (たこ焼き or 蛸焼) is a ball-shaped Japanese snack made of a wheat flour-based batter and cooked in a special molded pan.	
takoyaki	takoyaki	蛸焼	蛸焼	takoyaki	takoyaki	Takoyaki (たこ焼き or 蛸焼) is a ball-shaped Japanese snack made of a wheat flour-based batter and cooked in a special molded pan.	
tama	bullet, shell	弾	彈	tama	bullet, shell		
tatami	sport play area	畳	疊	tatami	tatami	Tatami (畳) is a type of mat used as a flooring material in traditional Japanese-style rooms.	
taté	Stand up!	立て	立て	tate	Stand up!		
téikoku	empire	帝国	帝國	teikoku	empire		
tempura	tempura	天ぷら		tenpura	tempura	Tempura is Japanese dish usually consisting of seafood or vegetables that have been battered and deep fried.	
tempura	tempura	天麩羅	天麩羅	tenpura	tempura	Tempura is Japanese dish usually consisting of seafood or vegetables that have been battered and deep fried.	
téncosétsu	Emperor's Birthday	天長節	天長節	tenchōsetsu	Emperor's Birthday	Emperor's Birthday was named 天長節 from 1868 to 1948, has been named 天皇誕生日 (tennōtanjōbi) since 1948.	
ténko	roll call	点呼	点呼	tenko	roll call		
tenno heika	1. Emperor of Japan, 2. Hirohito, Emperor Shōwa	天皇陛下	天皇陛下	tennō heika	His Imperial Majesty (of Japan)	1. originally refer to current Emperor in Japan; 2. as the term introduced at World War II, the phrase refers to Hirohito, Emperor Shōwa (April 29, 1901 – January 7, 1989), the Emperor of Japan at that time.; 3. 天皇 (tennō) = Japanese emperor, 陛下 (heika) = majesty	
teno	Emperor of Japan	天皇	天皇	tennō	Emperor of Japan		
teriyaki	teriyaki	照り焼き		teriyaki	teriyaki	Teriyaki is a cooking technique used in Japanese cuisine in which foods are broiled or grilled with a glaze of soy sauce, mirin, and sugar.	
teriyaki	teriyaki	照焼	照燒	teriyaki	teriyaki	Teriyaki is a cooking technique used in Japanese cuisine in which foods are broiled or grilled with a glaze of soy sauce, mirin, and sugar.	
tekidanto	grenade launcher	擲弾筒	擲彈筒	tekidantō	grenade launcher		
tépo	gun, rifle	鉄砲	鐵砲	teppō	gun		
tépo	gun, rifle	鉄炮	鐵炮	teppō	gun		
tobang	military or police helper (or lackey)	当番	当番	tōban	being on duty		
tobiko	tobiko	飛び子	飛び子	tobiko	tobiko	Tobiko (とびこ) is the Japanese word for flying fish roe.	
tofu	extra soft tofu	豆腐	豆腐	tōfu	tofu	see also tahu, loan word from Chinese.	
tokubetsuhan	special squad of staff officers	特別班	特別班	tokubetsuhan	special unit		
tomare	Halt!	止まれ	止まれ	tomare	Halt!		
tonarigumi	neighbourhood association	隣組	隣組	tonarigumi	neighbourhood association		
toyota	a Toyota jeep	トヨタ	トヨタ	toyota		Toyota Motor Corporation, usually shortened to Toyota, is a Japanese multinational automotive manufacturer headquartered in Toyota, Aichi, Japan which founded by Toyoda, Kiichirō (豊田 喜一郎).	
tsunami	tsunami	津波	津波	tsunami	1. tsunami, tidal wave, 2. tidal bore		
tsuru	crane-shaped origami	鶴	鶴	tsuru	crane		

=== U ===
Indonesian Word	Indonesian Meaning	Japanese New Form	Japanese Old Form	Japanese Transliteration	Japanese Meaning	Note	Ref
udon	udon	うどん		udon	udon	Udon is a type of thick wheat flour noodle, used frequently in Japanese cuisine.	
udon	udon	饂飩	饂飩	udon	udon	Udon is a type of thick wheat flour noodle, used frequently in Japanese cuisine.	
umami	umami	旨味	旨味	umami	umami	Umami, lit. "pleasant savory taste", is one of the five basic tastes, has been described as savory, and characteristic of broths and cooked meats.	

=== W ===
Indonesian Word	Indonesian Meaning	Japanese New Form	Japanese Old Form	Japanese Transliteration	Japanese Meaning	Note	Ref
wagyu	wagyu	和牛	和牛	wagyū	wagyu	Wagyu (和牛 Wagyū, "Japanese cow") is any of four Japanese breeds of beef cattle.	
wasabi	wasabi	わさび		wasabi	wasabi	Wasabi (Eutrema japonicum or Wasabia japonica) is a plant of the family Brassicaceae, which also includes horseradish and mustard.	
wasabi	wasabi	山葵	山葵	wasabi	wasabi	Wasabi (Eutrema japonicum or Wasabia japonica) is a plant of the family Brassicaceae, which also includes horseradish and mustard.	
wazari	winning score in judo	技あり		waza-ari	waza-ari, half-point		
wazari	winning score in judo	技有り		waza-ari	waza-ari, half-point		

=== Y ===
Indonesian Word	Indonesian Meaning	Japanese New Form	Japanese Old Form	Japanese Transliteration	Japanese Meaning	Note	Ref
yakitori	yakitori	焼き鳥	焼き鳥	yakitori	yakitori	Yakitori is a Japanese type of skewered chicken.	
yamaha		ヤマハ	ヤマハ	yamaha		Yamaha Corporation is a Japanese multinational corporation and conglomerate with a very wide range of products and services, predominantly musical instruments, electronics and power sports equipment which established by Torakusu Yamaha (山葉寅楠) in 1867.	
yamato	yamato	大和	大和	yamato	yamato	Yamato (大和) was originally the area around today's Sakurai City in Nara prefecture of Japan which became the Yamato Province and by extension a name for the whole of Japan.	
yasume	(Stand) at ease!	休め	休め	yasume	(Stand) at ease!		
yen	yen	円	圓	en	1. yen, money, 2. circle		
yugékitai	guerilla task force	遊撃隊	遊擊隊	yūgekitai	commando unit		
yuyitsu	jujutsu	柔術	柔術	jujutsu	jujutsu	see also jujitsu.	

=== Z ===
Indonesian Word	Indonesian Meaning	Japanese New Form	Japanese Old Form	Japanese Transliteration	Japanese Meaning	Note	Ref
zaibatsu	zaibatsu	財閥	財閥	zaibatsu	zaibatsu	zaibatsu (財閥, "financial clique") is a Japanese term referring to industrial and financial business conglomerates in the Empire of Japan.	
zaimubu	financial department	財務部	財務部	zaimubu	financial department		
zen	zen	禅	禪	zen	zen	Zen is the Japanese variant of Chan Buddhism, a Mahayana school that strongly emphasizes dhyana concentration-meditation.	
zimukyokuco	head of the administrative section	事務局長	事務局長	jimukyokuchō	head of secretariat		
zinkozosan	raising local production	人工増産	人工增産	jinkōzōsan	artificial production increase		

== Bibliography ==
- Badudu, J.S; Kamus Kata-kata Serapan Asing Dalam Bahasa Indonesia; Kompas, Jakarta, 2003
- Kamus Besar Bahasa Indonesia, Departemen Pendidikan dan Kebudayaan, Jakarta, Balai Pustaka: 1999, halaman 1185 s.d. 1188 berisikan Pendahuluan buku Senarai Kata Serapan dalam Bahasa Indonesia, Departemen Pendidikan dan Kebudayaan, Jakarta, 1996 (dengan sedikit penyaduran tanpa mengubah maksud dan tujuan seseungguhnya dari buku ini).
