= Type 99 mine =

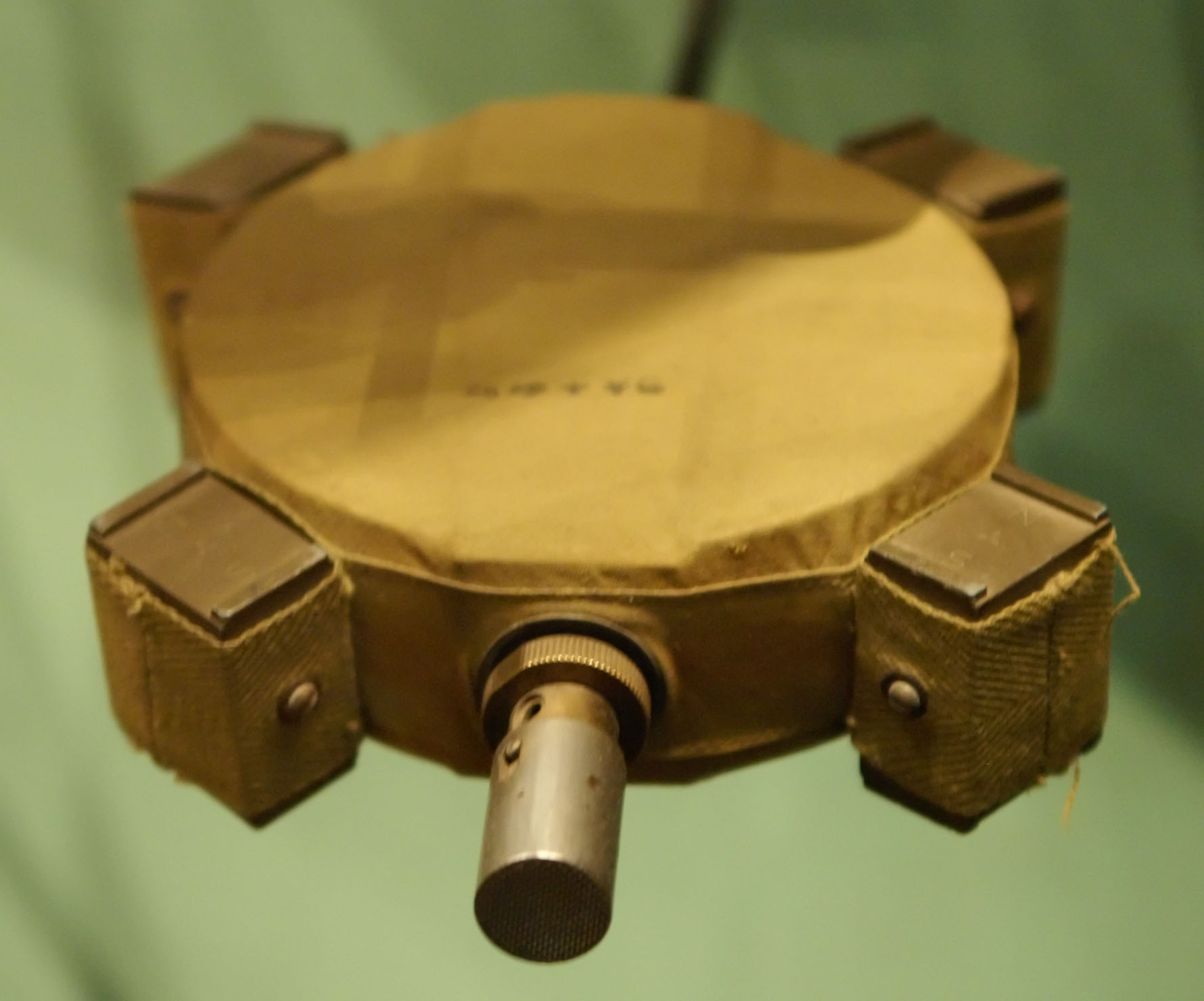
- A Type 99 mine at the Imperial War Museum in London. Note the four magnets and the protruding fuze, and the missing safety pin.
- Type: Antitank, vehicle mine
- Place of origin: Empire of Japan

Service history
- In service: 1939–1945
- Wars: Second Sino-Japanese War, World War II, Chinese Civil War

Specifications
- Mass: 1.21 kg
- Height: 4 cm
- Diameter: 12 cm
- Filling: TNT/RDX
- Filling weight: 1.5 lb (680 g)
- Detonation mechanism: Timed fuse, magnetic starter

The Type 99 (Hako-Baku-Rai) mine was a Japanese anti-tank weapon used during the Second World War. It entered service in 1939. Four magnets were attached to the casing made of hemp cloth, along with an external fuze. The fuze had a time delay, which enabled it to be used as an anti-tank hand grenade, or a demolition charge. Once the safety pin was removed, it was armed, striking the fuze ignited a powder delay train. The mine detonated after a five to ten seconds delay, giving enough time for it to be thrown.

The mines could be stacked, held together by the magnets for greater effect. When used individually the mine could penetrate approximately 0.75 inches (19 mm) of steel, with two mines stacked it can penetrate 1.25 inches (32 mm) of steel.

Burma-based British forces carried out tests of captured Type 99 mines on Stuart and Lee tanks and found the mine to be extremely effective against armor of 20 mm or less but largely ineffective against armor of 35 mm or higher. Japanese doctrine called for infantry, usually hiding along the side of the road, to throw the Type 99 mine against horizontal surfaces at a distance of 2 to 3 meters. Usually infantry would emplace the mine on top metallic surfaces, such as a tank engine deck

== Specifications ==
- Length of fuse: 5.25 inches (133 mm)
