= USS Hydrographer (AGS-2) =

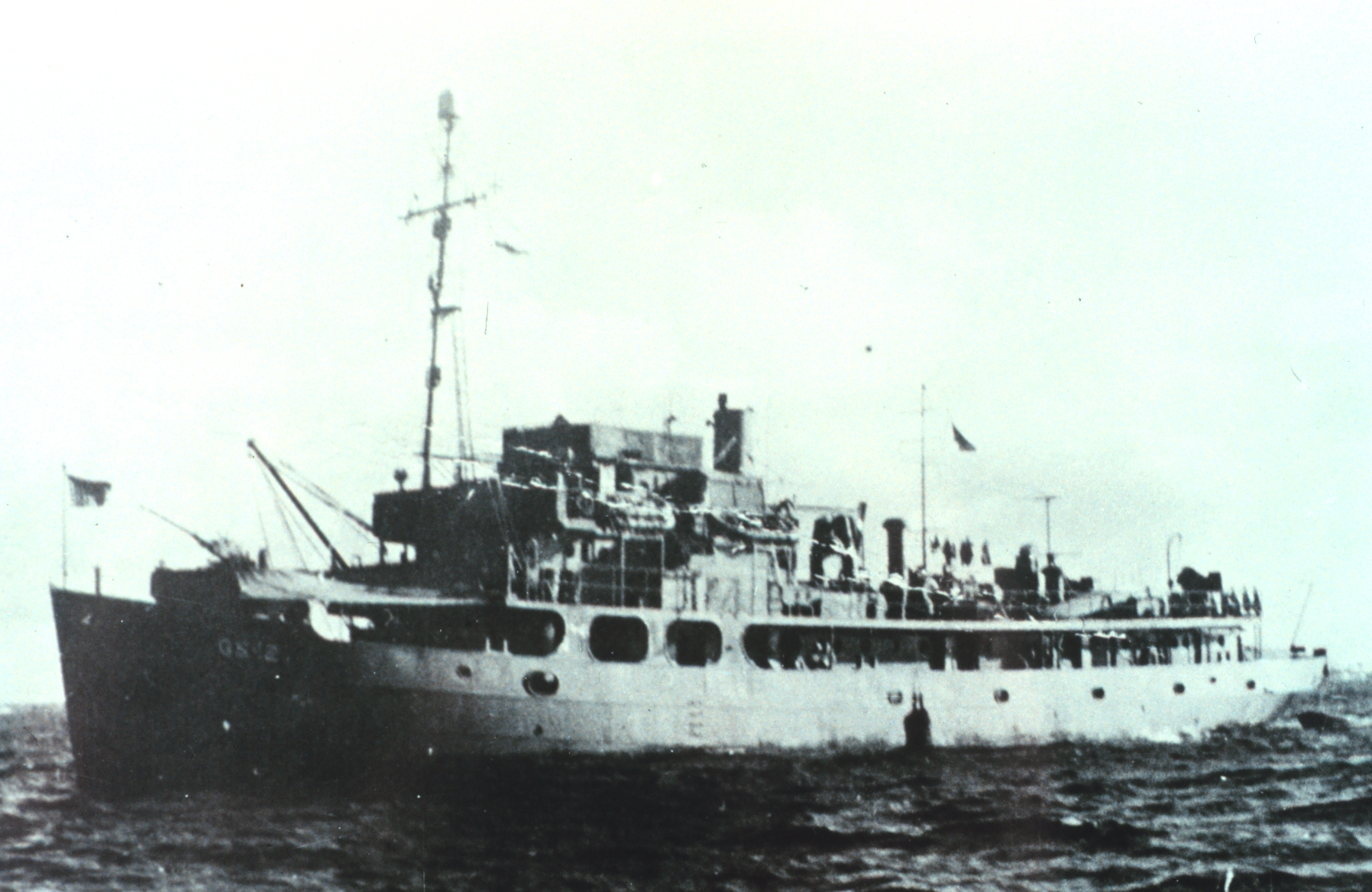
- The U.S. Coast and Geodetic Survey Ship Hydrographer in U.S. Navy service as USS Hydrographer (AGS-2).

History

United States
- Name: USS Hydrographer (AGS-2)
- Namesake: Hydrographer
- Builder: Spear Engine Works
- Launched: 1928
- Acquired: April 1942
- Commissioned: 20 May 1942
- Decommissioned: 1 July 1946
- Reclassified: AGS-2 20 May 1942
- Refit: Choctaw Boat Works May 1942
- Honors and awards: Three battle stars
- Fate: Returned to the U.S. Coast and Geodetic Survey

General characteristics
- Displacement: 1,044 tons (full)
- Length: 164 ft 11 in (50.27 m)
- Beam: 31 ft 6 in (9.60 m)
- Draft: 11 ft 6 in (3.51 m)
- Speed: 10 kn (19 km/h)
- Armament: 2 x 3 in (76 mm)

USS Hydrographer (AGS-2), briefly classified PY-30 before commissioning, was built in 1928 by the Spear Engine Works in Norfolk, Virginia, and operated as a survey ship along the Atlantic coast and in the Caribbean for the United States Coast and Geodetic Survey. Acquired by the United States Navy in April 1942, she was converted for U.S. Navy service by the Choctaw Boat Works in Alabama and commissioned as AGS-2 at Mobile, Alabama on 20 May 1942.

Immediately after commissioning, Hydrographer steamed to Newfoundland, where she spent the remainder of 1942 charting the approaches and harbor to the important Allied base at Argentia. She returned to the Norfolk Navy Yard 7 November 1942; and, after alterations to fit her for duty in the Pacific, sailed 30 December for San Diego, via the Canal Zone. The survey ship got underway 26 February 1943 for Atka Island, in the Aleutians, and arrived 22 March to carry out a survey of Korovin Bay, in preparation for the spring offensive to come. In April, she moved to Adak for more survey work.

As combined forces moved on Attu 11 May, Hydrographer moved into the assault area. Steaming into Massacre Bay 12 May, she sent out survey parties to outline transport anchorages and chart shoals. Late in May, she landed parties on tiny Shemya Island to begin work on a bomber strip, after which she returned to Adak. Hydrographer also took part in the occupation of Kiska, sailing 13 August and reaching the island 2 days later, only to find that the Japanese had completely evacuated. With the Aleutians secured, the ship continued her survey and sounding work until returning San Diego 22 September 1943.

Hydrographer arrived Pearl Harbor 10 November 1943 to take part in the push across the Pacific to Japan. She arrived Abemama, in the Gilberts, 24 December and made surveys of the lagoon and anchorages. Makin Island was also surveyed before she moved on to the Marshalls, as the survey ship followed closely behind the amphibious groups. She remained at Kwajalein until May preparing charts; and, after survey work at Roi, sailed 24 July to Guam. Arriving 3 August 1944, Hydrographer surveyed Apra Harbor and other coves in the vicinity. During these operations the ship's shore parties were often fired upon by Japanese snipers; but, undaunted, carried out their hydrographic work.

As the fleet continued to press toward Japan in a series of amphibious landings, Hydrographer sailed from Guam 1 October bound for the Palaus. En route she rode out a large typhoon and arriving safely Kossel Passage, 14 October 1944. In the months that followed, the ship charted and surveyed many islands in the southern Palaus, helped to establish anchorages and seaplane landing areas, and buoyed channels. She was occasionally harassed by night raids from the Japanese-held island, and on the night of 9–10 February 1945 helped destroy two swimmers approaching with an explosive raft.

Her work completed 25 February, she sailed via Guam and Pearl Harbor for San Francisco, where she arrived 22 April. The survey ship trained off the West Coast until the end of the war. Getting underway again 16 August 1945, she made further surveys at Eniwetok, Wake Island, and Kwajalein before sailing from Pearl Harbor for the United States 3 January 1946. Transiting the Panama Canal, she arrived at Norfolk 6 March and decommissioned 1 July 1946. She was simultaneously returned to the Coast and Geodetic Survey for peacetime operations.

Hydrographer received three battle stars for World War II Service.
