= Special (lighting) =

In stage lighting, a special is a lighting instrument used for a very specific purpose, rather than as part of a system such as an area light or color wash. It is typically used alone, or at a higher level than the other instruments. They can be used to highlight specific objects onstage, such as pieces of furniture, or to fill gaps not covered by less-specific area lights. They can also create a very specific effect onstage, such as sunlight through a window, or gobo rotation. They are generally wired to their own circuits, dimmers and channels, to be independently controlled.
