= Shinbu =

Shinbu (Japanese: 神武) is a Japanese word, meaning "military might" or, in the narrow sense, "sublime martial moral power". The most common orthography of the word consists of the characters shin/kami (神), meaning "deity" or "something divine", and bu (武), denoting military, chivalry or arms. The idea of shinbu embraces physical, spiritual and ethical issues and denotes the condition when all basic principles of martial art are applied simultaneously and in balance. The phrase shinbu ni shite fusetsu ("to attain shinbu and kill not") appears in a number of treatises from Tokugawa era, the best known of which is Neko no myōjutsu.

The word attached to kamikaze squadrons of the Imperial Japanese Army Air Force, such as the 72nd Shinbu Squadron, is a different word written as 振武.

== See also ==
- Budō
- Bushido
- Fudoshin
- Kendo
- Mushin
- Zen Buddhism
