= Mushin =

Mushin may refer to:

- Mushin (mental state) ("no-mind"), a concept in East Asian religions and arts
- Mushin, Lagos
