= Ippon =

Best score in Japanese martial arts

Ippon (一本; lit. "one full point") is the highest score a fighter can achieve in a Japanese martial arts ippon-wazari contest, usually kendo, judo, karate or jujitsu.

== In judo ==
In judo, an ippon may be scored for a throw, a pin, a choke or a jointlock. For throws, the four granting criteria are speed, force, landing on the back and skilful control until the end of the landing. For pinning techniques, the pin must be held continuously for 20 seconds. For chokes and locks, it is scored when the opponent gives up or is incapacitated.

Two consecutive waza-ari by the same athlete also add up to an ippon (waza-ari awasete ippon).

An ippon in judo is often compared to a knockout punch in boxing.

== In karate ==
In shobu ippon kumite, a method of karate competition, an ippon is awarded for a technique judged as decisive. This is usually a move that connects cleanly, with good form and with little opportunity for the opponent to defend against it. Kicks to the head of an opponent or judo throws followed up with a strike to the downed opponent are particularly likely to be considered a winning ippon technique. A competitor is declared the winner upon achieving a judgment of ippon.

Occasionally, shobu nihon kumite is used, in which two decisive strikes (or four less-decisive strikes, scored as waza-ari) are required for a win. In many tournaments, sanbon scoring is used. This promotes a flashier style of fighting more suited to a spectator sport. More traditional tournaments usually use ippon scoring.

== In kendo ==
In a kendo shiai (match), an ippon is awarded when a competitor who strikes their opponent achieves yuko-datotsu (a valid strike). The criteria for yuko-datotsu is defined as striking a valid part of the bogu, with the striking part of the shinai, in high spirits, with correct posture and demonstrating zanshin. Alternatively, an ippon is also awarded if a competitor's opponent receives two hansoku (penalties). Hansoku are variously given for (among other things) stepping out of the court, touching the opponent's shinai or deliberately striking the opponent on an unprotected part of the body.

Kendo shiai are variously run as ippon-shobu (one point match) or sanbon-shobu (three point match). In ippon-shobu, the first person to score ippon will win the match. In sanbon-shobu, the first person to score two ippon, or is leading when the time limit is reached, will win the match.

== See also ==
- Waza-ari
- Ippon seoi nage
