= Yukio Araki =

Japanese kamikaze pilot (1928–1945)

- 荒木 幸雄
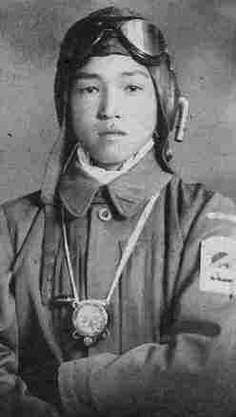
- Araki c. 1943
- Born: March 10, 1928; Miyamae-cho, Kiryū, Gunma, Japan
- Died: May 27, 1945 (aged 17); USS Braine (DD-630), off Okinawa, Japan
- Cause of death: Suicide by kamikaze
- Military career
- Allegiance: Empire of Japan
- Branch: Imperial Japanese Army
- Service years: 1944–1945
- Rank: Corporal
- Unit: 72nd Shinbu Squadron
- Conflicts: World War II; Battle of Okinawa †

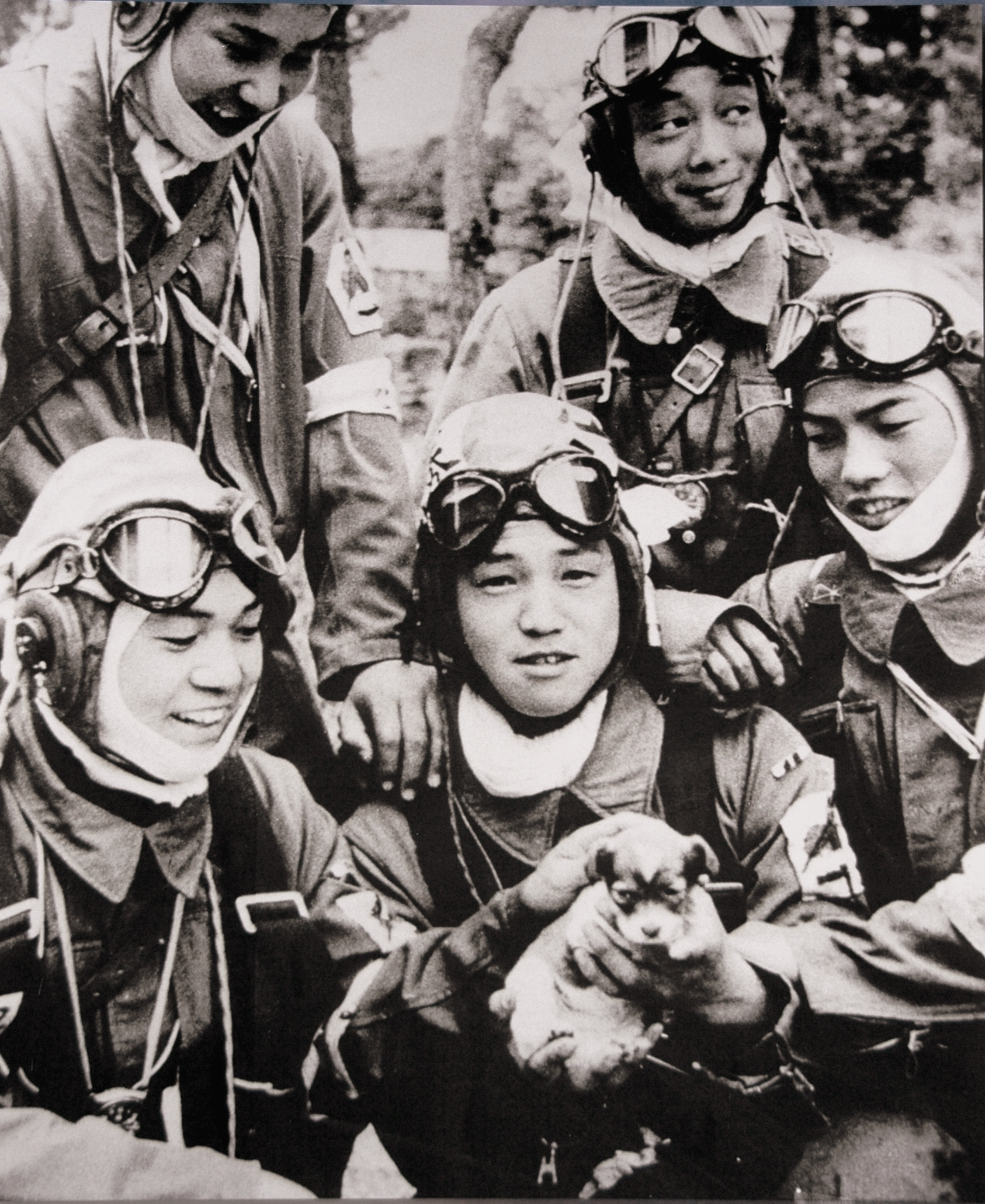
Corporal Yukio Araki (centre) holds a puppy in a group photo taken one day before his death, 26 May 1945.

Yukio Araki (荒木 幸雄, Araki Yukio; March 10, 1928 – May 27, 1945) was a Japanese aviator of the Imperial Japanese Army during World War II. As a kamikaze pilot and member of the 72nd Shinbu Squadron, Araki died on May 27, 1945, during the Battle of Okinawa when he deliberately crashed his bomb-laden Mitsubishi Ki-51 into the USS Braine. It is speculated that Araki and one other pilot hit and damaged the ship, killing 66 of its crew. At 17, Araki was one of the youngest kamikaze pilots.

== Biography ==
Araki Yukio was born on March 10, 1928, in Miyamae, Kiryu, Gunma Prefecture. At the age of fifteen he joined the Imperial Japanese Army Air Service's Youth Pilot Training Program. In or around September 1943, he began training at the Tachiarai Air Base. After he graduated he started working at Metabaru Air Field, and in 1944 he got work at Heijo (now known as Pyongyang), Korea. On 27 May 1945, Araki took off from Bansei Airfield, at Bansei (now part of Minamisatsuma), Kawanabe District, Kagoshima Prefecture in a Mitsubishi Ki-51 on a kamikaze mission. At the age of seventeen, Araki is one of the youngest known kamikaze pilots. It has been speculated that his plane was one of two that struck the USS Braine, killing 66 of its crew; however, the ship did not sink.

Araki had been home in April 1945, and left letters for his family, to be opened upon the news of his death. The letter to his parents noted:

Please find pleasure in your desire for my loyalty to the emperor and devotion to parents.

I have no regrets. I just go forward on my path.

Prior to his mission, and in accordance with the custom of the kamikaze pilots, Araki cut a lock of his hair and clipped his fingernails, which together were to be sent to his parents following his death. These were sent to his family for burial in a cemetery in Kiryu.

== Cultural references ==
In 2004, Tsuneyuki Mori published Araki's biography, entitled Yuki Died at 17 in a Kamikaze Attack - Farewell Puppy, Beloved Soul (ユキは十七歳 特攻で死んだ – 子犬よさらば、愛しきいのち). Mori is a screenwriter and novelist whose bibliography's most often theme are kamikaze pilots and their world.

== See also ==
- Bansei Tokkō Peace Museum
- 72nd Shinbu Squadron
