= Shoshin =

Zen Buddhism concept of the beginner's mind

Shoshin (Japanese: 初心) is a concept from Zen Buddhism meaning beginner's mind. It refers to having an attitude of openness, eagerness, and lack of preconceptions when studying, even at an advanced level, just as a beginner would. The term is especially used in the study of Zen Buddhism and Japanese martial arts, and was popularized outside of Japan by Shunryū Suzuki's 1970 book Zen Mind, Beginner's Mind.

The practice of shoshin acts as a counter to the hubris and closed-mindedness often associated with thinking of oneself as an expert. This includes the Einstellung effect, where a person becomes so accustomed to a certain way of doing things that they do not consider or acknowledge new ideas or approaches. The word shoshin is a combination of sho (Japanese: 初), meaning "beginner" or "initial", and shin (Japanese: 心), meaning "mind".

== History ==
The concept was taught in the thirteenth century by Dōgen Zenji, the founder of the Sōtō Zen school of Buddhism. Shoshin is discussed in his collected works, the Shōbōgenzō. Shoshin was popularized outside of Japan by the 1970 book Zen Mind, Beginner's Mind by Shunryū Suzuki, a Zen teacher. Suzuki outlines the framework behind shoshin, noting that "in the beginner's mind there are many possibilities, but in the expert's mind there are few" which has become a popular quote when discussing shoshin.

Shoshin wasuru bekarazu (or sometimes variously Shoshin wo wasuru bekarazu) is a Japanese proverb about shoshin coined by Japanese playwright Zeami in 1424. The phrase is typically translated into English as some variation of "never forget the beginner's mind" or "never forget your original intent" and persists as a common proverb amongst practitioners of Budō and in Japanese business and entrepreneurship. The concept of shoshin is seen in works such as the eighteenth century book Budôshoshinshû by Daidōji Yūzan, which is a collection of works about Bushidō and the warrior class in Tokugawa-period Japan. The word shoshin within the title refers to the concept of the beginner's mind.

== Other uses ==
The concept of shoshin is used in the art of Japanese calligraphy in the context of Zen, where each stroke is made as though the calligrapher were a beginner to the art. In Japanese calligraphy shoshin is not an aesthetic choice, but rather a state of mind of the practitioner, one that addresses and counters the paradox within calligraphy where the more one practices, the more the quality of the calligraphy may suffer.

Shoshin is described as the first of the states of mind or stages of Budō. Shoshin (beginner's mind) is followed by Mushin (empty mind), Fudōshin (immovable mind), and Zanshin (remaining mind). A fifth state is sometimes also added as Senshin (enlightened mind). In Budō the practitioner is advised to retain shoshin throughout their training and practice of the martial arts; it is not reserved only for those beginning to practice but is maintained even when reaching the higher levels of mastery. Shoshin-sha is a term used in martial arts to indicate a novice.

Shoshin is an influence on the Japanese Metabolism style of architecture, which incorporates concepts from Zen Buddhism and other Asian philosophical traditions into the architectural process and allows those concepts to help shape the design process. Many businesses and people who work in the field of business have adopted or advocate for practicing the concept of shoshin in the business environment, including top executives such as Apple Inc.'s founder and CEO Steve Jobs, and Salesforce CEO Marc Benioff. It is also used or proposed as a way of general living or a way to approach specific fields of life including social work, medical care, teaching, computer programming, gardening, sports, and dealing with chronic diseases such as phenylketonuria.

== See also ==
- Beginner's luck
- Curse of knowledge
- Kenshō
- Samyama
- Satori
