= List of Imperial Japanese Army air-to-surface special attack units =

This article handles air-to-surface special attack units by "Action Order only" and does not cover air-to-air suicide attack groups like the Shinten Air Superiority Group (Shinten Seikūtai)m Type 4 suicide boat group the Army Maritime Assault Squadron (Rikugun Kaijō Teishin Sentai) and other voluntary special/suicide attacks.

Air unit names in this article.
Japanese military unit names have various translations

Japanese (Kanji)	Rōmaji	Abbreviation code in IJA	English
航空総軍	Kōkū Sōgun	FSA	Supreme Army Air force
航空軍	Kōkūgun	FA	Army Air Force
教導航空軍	Kyōdō Kōkūgun	KFA	Instructing Army Air Force
飛行集団	Hikō Shūdan	FC	Flying Corps
戦闘飛行集団	Sentō Hikō Shūdan	FC	Fighter Corps
航空師団	Kōkū Shidan	KD	Air Division
飛行師団	Hikō Shidan	FD	Flying Division
教導飛行師団	Kyōdō Hikō Shidan	KFD	Instructing Flying Division
教育飛行師団	Kyōiku Hikō Shidan	KED	Educational Flying Division
飛行団	Hikōdan	FB	Flying Brigade
教育飛行団	Kyōiku Hikōdan	KFB	Educational Flying Brigade
飛行戦隊	Hikō Sentai	F or FR	Flying Regiment
教育飛行隊	Kyōiku Hikōtai	FRK	Educational Squadron
練習飛行隊	Renshū Hikōtai	FRF	Training Squadron
錬成飛行隊	Rensei Hikōtai	FRL	Learning Squadron
野戦補充飛行隊	Yasen Hojū Hikōtai		Field Supply Squadron
独立飛行団	Dokuritsu Hikōdan	FBs	Independent Flying Brigade
独立教育飛行団	Dokuritsu Kyōiku Hikōdan	KFBs	Independent Educational Flying Brigade
独立飛行隊	Dokuritsu Hikōtai	Fs	Independent Squadron
独立飛行中隊	Dokuritsu Hikō Chūtai	Fcs	Independent Chūtai
挺進集団	Teishin Shūdan	RD	Raiding Division
挺進飛行団	Teishin Hikōdan	RFB	Raiding Flying Brigade
挺進飛行戦隊	Teishin Hikō Sentai	RFR	Raiding Flying Regiment
滑空飛行戦隊	Kakkū Hikō Sentai	KFR	Gliding Flying Regiment
陸軍飛行学校	Rikugun Hikō Gakkō		Army Flying School

== Hakkō Unit ==
- Hakkō Unit No. 1, "Hakkō Unit" (八紘第一隊 八紘隊,, Hakkō Dai 1-tai, "Hakkō-tai")
  - Original unit; Akeno Instructing Flying Division
  - 27 November 1944
    - 11× Ki-43 III; U.S. convoy in Leyte Gulf.
  - 7 December 1944
    - 1× Ki-43 III; U.S. convoy in Ormoc Bay.
  - 12 December 1944
    - 1× Ki-43 III; U.S. convoy off Baybay.
- Hakkō Unit No. 2, "Ichiu Unit" (八紘第二隊 一宇隊,, Hakkō Dai 2-tai, "Ichiu-tai")
  - Original unit; Hitachi Instructing Flying Division
  - 5 December 1944
    - 3× Ki-43 III; U.S. ship in Surigao Strait.
  - 7 December 1944
    - 2× Ki-43 III; U.S. convoy in Ormoc Bay.
  - 13 December 1944
    - 1× Ki-43 III; U.S. ship off Mindanao.
- Hakkō Unit No. 3, "Yasukuni Unit" (八紘第三隊 靖國隊,, Hakkō Dai 3-tai, "Yasukuni-tai")
  - Original unit; 51st Educational Flying Division
  - 24 November 1944
    - 3× Ki-43 III; U.S. ship off Manicani.
  - 26 November 1944
    - 2× Ki-43 III; U.S. ship in Leyte Gulf.
  - 29 November 1944
    - 6× Ki-43 III; U.S. ship in Leyte Gulf.
  - 7 December 1944
    - 1× Ki-43 III; U.S. ship in Ormoc Bay.
- Hakkō Unit No. 4, "Gokoku Unit" (八紘第四隊 護國隊,, Hakkō Dai 4-tai, "Gokoku-tai")
  - Original unit; 10th Flying Division
  - 7 December 1944
    - 7× Ki-43 III; U.S. ship in Ormoc Bay.
  - 10 January 1945
    - 1× Ki-43 III; U.S. ship in Lingayen Gulf.
- Hakkō Unit No. 5, "Tesshin Unit" (八紘第五隊 鐵心隊,, Hakkō Dai 5-tai, "Tesshin-tai")
  - Original unit; Hokota Instructing Flying Division
  - 5 December 1944
    - 3× Ki-51; U.S. ship off Suluan Island.
  - 16 December 1944
    - 2× Ki-51; U.S. ship off Mindoro.
  - 18 December 1944
    - 1× Ki-51; U.S. ship off Mindoro.
  - 29 December 1944
    - 3× Ki-51; U.S. ship off Mindoro.
  - 6 January 1945
    - 2× Ki-51; U.S. ship West of Luzon.
- Hakkō Unit No. 6, "Sekichō Unit" (八紘第六隊 石腸隊,, Hakkō Dai 6-tai, "Sekichō-tai")
  - Original unit; Shimoshizu Instructing Flying Division
  - 5 December 1944
    - 7× Ki-51; U.S. ship in Surigao Strait.
  - 8 December 1944
    - 1× Ki-51; U.S. ship in Ormoc Bay.
  - 12 December 1944
    - 1× Ki-51; U.S. convoy off Baybay.
  - 22 December 1944
    - 1× Ki-51; U.S. ship off San Jose.
  - 5 January 1945
    - 3× Ki-51; U.S. carrier task force West of Luzon.
  - 6 January 1945
    - 1× Ki-51; U.S. ship off San Fernando.
  - 8 January 1945
    - 3× Ki-51; U.S. ship in Lingayen Gulf.
- Hakkō Unit No. 7, "Tanshin Unit" (八紘第七隊 丹心隊,, Hakkō Dai 7-tai, "Tanshin-tai")
  - Original unit; Akeno Instructing Flying Division
  - 10 December 1944
    - 6× Ki-43 III; U.S. ship in Surigao Strait.
  - 12 December 1944
    - 1× Ki-43 III; U.S. convoy off Baybay.
  - 17 December 1944
    - 2× Ki-43 III; U.S. ship off Mindoro.
- Hakkō Unit No. 8, "Kinnō Unit" (八紘第八隊 勤皇隊,, Hakkō Dai 8-tai, "Kinnō-tai")
  - Original unit; Hokota Instructing Flying Division
  - 7 December 1944
    - 9× Ki-45 Kai c; U.S. ship in Ormoc Bay.
  - 10 December 1944
    - 3× Ki-45 Kai c; U.S. ship in Leyte Gulf.
- Hakkō Unit No. 9, "Ichisei Unit" (八紘第九隊 一誠隊,, Hakkō Dai 9-tai, "Ichisei-tai")
  - Original unit; Akeno Instructing Flying Division
  - 22 December 1944
    - 1× Ki-43 III; U.S. ship off Mindoro.
  - 4 January 1945
    - 2× Ki-43 III; U.S. ship in Sulu Sea.
  - 5 January 1945
    - 3× Ki-43 III; U.S. carrier task force West of Luzon.
  - 8 January 1945
    - 3× Ki-43 III; U.S. carrier task force West of Luzon.
  - 9 January 1945
    - 2× Ki-43 III; U.S. ship in Leyte Gulf.
- Hakkō Unit No. 10, "Jungi Unit" (八紘第十隊 殉義隊,, Hakkō Dai 10-tai, "Jungi-tai")
  - Original unit; Hitachi Instructing Flying Division
  - 21 December 1944
    - 5× Ki-43 III; U.S. ship off Mindoro.
  - 22 December 1944
    - 2× Ki-43 III; U.S. ship West of Panay.
  - 29 December 1944
    - 1× Ki-43 III; U.S. ship off Mindoro.
  - 7 January 1945
    - 1× Ki-43 III; U.S. ship in Lingayen Gulf.
- Hakkō Unit No. 11, "Kōkon Unit" (八紘第十一隊 皇魂隊,, Hakkō Dai 11-tai, "Kōkon-tai")
  - Original unit; Hokota Instructing Flying Division
  - 6 January 1945
    - 1× Ki-45 Kai c; U.S. ship in Lingayen Gulf.
  - 8 January 1945
    - 4× Ki-45 Kai c; U.S. ship in Lingayen Gulf.
  - 10 January 1945
    - 1× Ki-45 Kai c; U.S. ship in Lingayen Gulf.
- Hakkō Unit No. 12, "Shinshū Unit" (八紘第十二隊 進襲隊,, Hakkō Dai 12-tai, "Shinshū-tai")
  - Original unit; Shimoshizu Instructing Flying Division
  - 30 December 1944
    - 5× Ki-51; U.S. convoy off San Jose.
  - 4 January 1945
    - 1× Ki-51; U.S. ship West of Luzon.
  - 5 January 1945
    - 1× Ki-51; U.S. ship West of Luzon.
  - 8 January 1945
    - 2× Ki-51; U.S. ship West of Luzon.

== Shinbu Unit ==
- Special Shinbu Unit No. 1 (第一特別振武隊,, Dai 1 Tokubetsu Shinbu-tai)
  - Original unit; 100th Flying Brigade, 101st Flying Regiment, 102nd Flying Regiment
  - 6 April 1945
    - 8× Ki-84 I; Allied ship West of Okinawa Island.
  - 12 April 1945
    - 2× Ki-84 I; Allied ship West of Okinawa Island.
- Command Reconnaissance Shinbu Unit, "Shinbu Sakura Special Attack Unit" (司偵振武隊 振武櫻特別攻撃隊,, Shitei Shinbu-tai, "Shinbu Sakura Tokubetsu Kōgeki-tai")
  - Original unit; 4th Flying Division, Navy 3rd Air Fleet
  - 7 April 1945
    - 1× Ki-46 III, 1× D4Y2;Allied ship off Kadena.
  - 12 April 1945
    - 1× Ki-46 III; Allied ship West of Okinawa Island.
  - 14 May 1945
    - 2× Ki-46 III; Allied ship West of Okinawa Island.
- 6th Army Air Force Attack Coommando, Shinbu Special Attack Unit, "Kakegawa Unit" (第六航空軍攻撃集団 振武特別攻撃隊 掛川隊,, Dai 6 Kōkūgun Kōgekishūdan, Shinbu Tokubetsu Kōgeki-tai, "Kakegawa-tai")
  - Original unit; Utsunomiya Instructing Flying Division
  - 30 March 1945
    - 1× Ki-21; Allied ship off Okinawa Island.
- Shinbu Unit No. 1 (第一振武隊,, Dai 1 Shinbu-tai)
  - Original unit; 10th Flying Division
    - 12× Ki-43 III; No-sorties, renamed Shinbu Unit No. 18 on 29 January 1945.
- Shinbu Unit No. 2 (第二振武隊,, Dai 2 Shinbu-tai)
  - Original unit; 10th Flying Division
    - 12× Ki-43 III; No-sorties, renamed Shinbu Unit No. 19 on 29 January 1945.
- Shinbu Unit No. 3 (第三振武隊,, Dai 3 Shinbu-tai)
  - Original unit; 11th Flying Division
    - 12× Ki-43 III; No-sorties, renamed Shinbu Unit No. 20 on 29 January 1945.
- Shinbu Unit No. 4 (第四振武隊,, Dai 4 Shinbu-tai)
  - Original unit; 12th Flying Division
    - 12× Ki-43 III; No-sorties, renamed Shinbu Unit No. 21 on 29 January 1945.
- Shinbu Unit No. 18 (第十八振武隊,, Dai 18 Shinbu-tai)
  - Original unit; 10th Flying Division
  - 29 April 1945
    - 6× Ki-43 III; Allied ship off Okinawa Island.
  - 4 May 1945
    - 1× Ki-43 III; Allied ship West of Okinawa Island.
- Shinbu Unit No. 19 (第十九振武隊,, Dai 19 Shinbu-tai)
  - Original unit; 10th Flying Division
  - 29 April 1945
    - 5× Ki-43 III; Allied ship off Okinawa Island.
  - 4 May 1945
    - 4× Ki-43 III; Allied ship West of Okinawa Island.

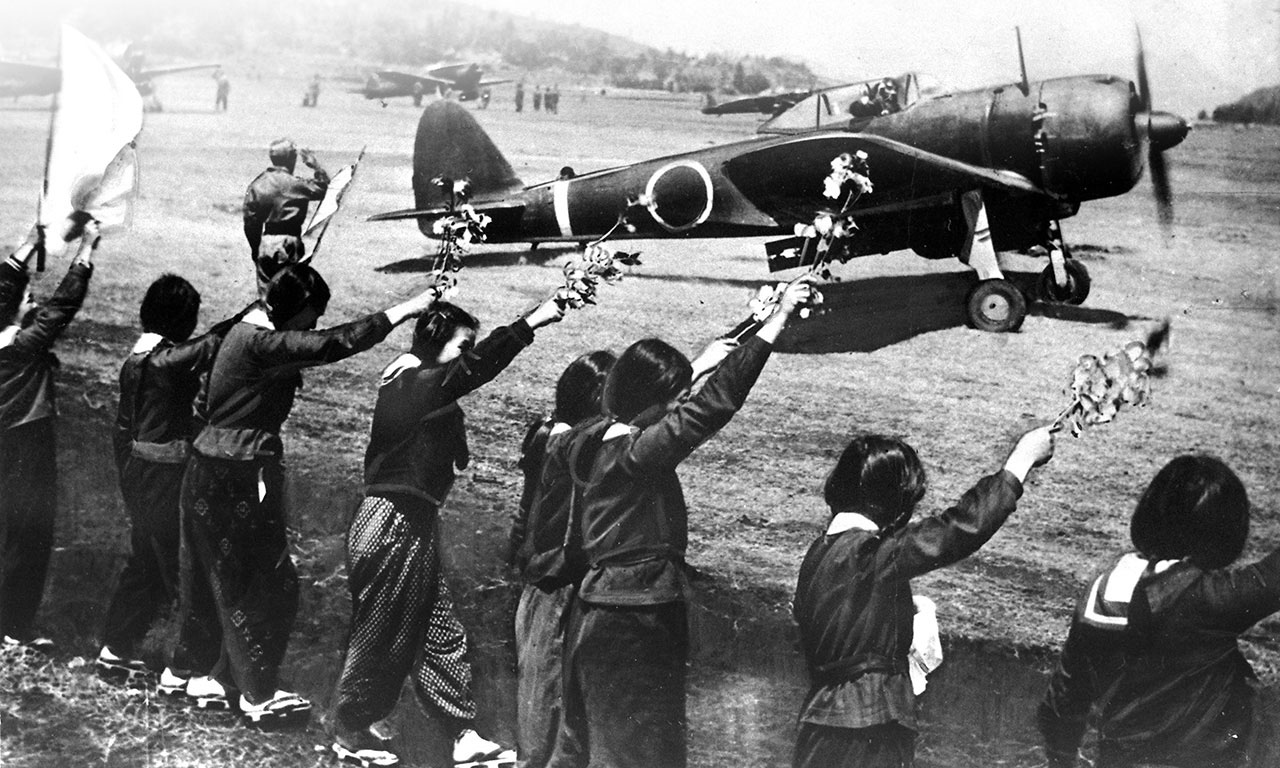
Ki-43 IIIa "Oscar" of Shinbu Unit No. 20, Chiran airfield, 12 April 1945.

- Shinbu Unit No. 20 (第二十振武隊,, Dai 20 Shinbu-tai)
  - Original unit; 11th Flying Division
  - 1 April 1945
    - 1× Ki-43 IIIa; Allied ship North of Kerama Islands.
  - 2 April 1945
    - 2× Ki-43 IIIa; Allied ship North of Kerama Islands.
  - 12 April 1945
    - 3× Ki-43 IIIa; Allied ship West of Okinawa Island.
  - 4 May 1945
    - 1× Ki-43 IIIa; Allied ship West of Okinawa Island.
- Shinbu Unit No. 21 (第二十一振武隊,, Dai 21 Shinbu-tai)
  - Original unit; 12th Flying Division
  - 5 April 1945
    - 1× Ki-43 III; Allied ship West of Okinawa Island.
  - 26 May 1945
    - 1× Ki-27 (Note: All Ki-27s were the description may include Ki-79.); Allied ship West of Okinawa Island.
- Shinbu Unit No. 22 (第二十二振武隊,, Dai 22 Shinbu-tai)
  - Original unit; Akeno Instructing Flying Division
  - 3 April 1945
    - 1× Ki-43 III; Allied ship West of Okinawa Island.
    - 1× Ki-43 III; Allied ship West of Tokunoshima.
  - 6 April 1945
    - 2× Ki-43 III; Allied ship South-West of Okinawa Island.
  - 7 April 1945
    - 1× Ki-43 III; Allied ship South-West of Okinawa Island.
  - 11 April 1945
    - 1× Ki-43 III; Allied ship South of Kerama Islands.
- Shinbu Unit No. 23 (第二十三振武隊,, Dai 23 Shinbu-tai)
  - Original unit; Shimoshizu Instructing Flying Division
  - 1 April 1945
    - 5× Ki-51; Allied ship South of Kerama Islands.
  - 3 April 1945
    - 5× Ki-51; Allied ship West of Okinawa Island.
- Shinbu Unit No. 24, "Shinbu Nishiki Unit" (第二十四振武隊 振武錦隊,, Dai 24 Shinbu-tai, "Shinbu Nishiki-tai")
  - Original unit; Hitachi Instructing Flying Division
  - 28 April 1945
    - 3× Ki-45 Kai c; Allied ship West of Okinawa Island.
  - 4 May 1945
    - 2× Ki-45 Kai c; Allied ship West of Okinawa Island.
- Shinbu Unit No. 25 (第二十五振武隊,, Dai 25 Shinbu-tai)
  - Original unit; Hokota Instructing Flying Division
    - Ki-48 II; No-sorties or unfinished organization. (Note: Their action records were not discovered. The same shall apply hereinafter.)
- Shinbu Unit No. 26, "Seii Unit" (第二十六振武隊 征夷隊,, Dai 26 Shinbu-tai, "Seii-tai")
  - Original unit; Akeno Instructing Flying Division
  - 25 May 1945
    - 2× Ki-84 I; Allied ship West of Okinawa Island.
  - 21 June 1945
    - 4× Ki-84 I; Allied ship West of Okinawa Island.
- Shinbu Unit No. 27, "Hayabusa Shippū Unit" (第二十七振武隊 隼疾風隊,, Dai 27 Shinbu-tai, "Hayabusa Shippū-tai")
  - Original unit; Akeno Instructing Flying Division
  - 22 June 1945
    - 6× Ki-84 I; Allied ship West of Okinawa Island.
- Shinbu Unit No. 28 (第二十八振武隊,, Dai 28 Shinbu-tai)
  - Original unit; 1st Army Air Force
    - Ki-51; No-sorties or unfinished organization.
- Shinbu Unit No. 29, "Kudan Special Attack Unit" (第二十九振武隊 九段特別攻撃隊,, Dai 29 Shinbu-tai, "Kudan Tokubetsu Kōgeki-tai")
  - Original unit; First Army Air Force, 2nd Learning Squadron
  - 7 April 1945
    - 1× Ki-43 III; Allied ship in Nakagusuku Bay.
  - 8 April 1945
    - 3× Ki-43 III; Allied ship West of Okinawa Island.
  - 18 April 1945
    - 2× Ki-43 III; Allied ship West of Okinawa Island.
  - 25 May 1945
    - 2× Ki-43 III; Allied ship West of Okinawa Island.
- Shinbu Unit No. 30 (第三十振武隊,, Dai 30 Shinbu-tai)
  - Original unit; First Army Air Force, 30th Educational Squadron
  - 10 April 1945
    - 1× Ki-51; Allied ship West of Okinawa Island.
  - 13 April 1945
    - 2× Ki-51; Allied ship West of Okinawa Island.
- Shinbu Unit No. 31 (第三十一振武隊,, Dai 31 Shinbu-tai)
  - Original unit; Second Army Air Force
    - Ki-51; No-sorties or unfinished organization.
- Shinbu Unit No. 32 (第三十二振武隊,, Dai 32 Shinbu-tai)
  - Original unit; Second Army Air Force
    - Ki-51; No-sorties or unfinished organization.
- Shinbu Unit No. 33 (第三十三振武隊,, Dai 33 Shinbu-tai)
  - Original unit; Akeno Instructing Flying Division
    - Ki-84 I; No-sorties or unfinished organization.
- Shinbu Unit No. 34 (第三十四振武隊,, Dai 34 Shinbu-tai)
  - Original unit; Akeno Instructing Flying Division
    - Ki-84 I; No-sorties or unfinished organization.
- Shinbu Unit No. 35 (第三十五振武隊,, Dai 35 Shinbu-tai)
  - Original unit; Hitachi Instructing Flying Division
    - Ki-84; No-sorties or unfinished organization.
- Shinbu Unit No. 36 (第三十六振武隊,, Dai 36 Shinbu-tai)
  - Original unit; Tachiarai Army Flying School
    - Ki-36; No-sorties or unfinished organization.
- Shinbu Unit No. 37 (第三十七振武隊,, Dai 37 Shinbu-tai)
  - Original unit; Tachiarai Army Flying School
    - Ki-36; No-sorties or unfinished organization.
- Shinbu Unit No. 38 (第三十八振武隊,, Dai 38 Shinbu-tai)
  - Original unit; Tachiarai Army Flying School
    - Ki-36; No-sorties or unfinished organization.
- Shinbu Unit No. 39 (第三十九振武隊,, Dai 39 Shinbu-tai)
  - Original unit; 2nd Army Air Force
    - Ki-43 III; No-sorties or unfinished organization.
- Shinbu Unit No. 40 (第四十振武隊,, Dai 40 Shinbu-tai)
  - Original unit; Akeno Instructing Flying Division
  - 16 April 1945
    - 6× Ki-27; Allied ship West of Okinawa Island.
- Shinbu Unit No. 41 (第四十一振武隊,, Dai 41 Shinbu-tai)
  - Original unit; Second Army Air Force
    - Ki-27; No-sorties or unfinished organization.
- Shinbu Unit No. 42 (第四十二振武隊,, Dai 42 Shinbu-tai)
  - Original unit; Akeno Instructing Flying Division
  - 8 April 1945
    - 4× Ki-27; Allied ship West of Okinawa Island.
  - 9 April 1945
    - 3× Ki-27; Allied ship West of Okinawa Island.
  - 16 April 1945
    - 1× Ki-27; Allied ship West of Okinawa Island.
  - 4 May 1945
    - 1× Ki-27; Allied ship West of Okinawa Island.
- Shinbu Unit No. 43 (第四十三振武隊,, Dai 43 Shinbu-tai)
  - Original unit; Akeno Instructing Flying Division
  - 6 April 1945
    - 5× Ki-43 III; Allied ship West of Okinawa Island.
  - 12 April 1945
    - 3× Ki-43 III; Allied ship West of Okinawa Island.
- Shinbu Unit No. 44 (第四十四振武隊,, Dai 44 Shinbu-tai)
  - Original unit; Hitachi Instructing Flying Division
  - 6 April 1945
    - 4× Ki-43 III; Allied ship West of Okinawa Island.
  - 7 April 1945
    - 2× Ki-43 III; Allied ship West of Okinawa Island.
  - 11 May 1945
    - 1× Ki-43 III; Allied ship West of Okinawa Island.
  - 3 June 1945
    - 1× Ki-43 III; Allied ship West of Okinawa Island.
- Shinbu Unit No. 45, "Kaishin Unit" (第四十五振武隊 快心隊,, Dai 45 Shinbu-tai, "Kaishin-tai")
  - Original unit; Hokota Instructing Flying Division
  - 28 May 1945
    - 9× Ki-45 Kai c; Allied ship West of Okinawa Island.
- Shinbu Unit No. 46 (第四十六振武隊,, Dai 46 Shinbu-tai)
  - Original unit; Hokota Instructing Flying Division
  - 6 April 1945
    - 4× Ki-51; Allied ship West of Okinawa Island.
  - 11 April 1945
    - 1× Ki-51; Allied ship West of Okinawa Island.
  - 12 April 1945
    - 1× Ki-51; Allied ship off Kadena.
  - 13 April 1945
    - 1× Ki-51; Allied ship West of Okinawa Island.
  - 15 April 1945
    - 1× Ki-51; Allied ship West of Okinawa Island.
- Shinbu Unit No. 47 (第四十七振武隊,, Dai 47 Shinbu-tai)
  - Original unit; Hamamatsu Instructing Flying Division
  - Ki-49; No-sorties or unfinished organization.
- Shinbu Unit No. 48, "Kamurai Unit" (第四十八振武隊 惟神隊,, Dai 48 Shinbu-tai, "Kamurai-tai")
  - Original unit; Akeno Instructing Flying Division
  - 28 May 1945
    - 2× Ki-43 III; Allied ship West of Okinawa Island.
  - 3 June 1945
    - 4× Ki-43 III; Allied ship West of Okinawa Island.
  - 8 June 1945
    - 2× Ki-43 III; Allied ship West of Okinawa Island.
- Shinbu Unit No. 49 (第四十九振武隊,, Dai 49 Shinbu-tai)
  - Original unit; Akeno Instructing Flying Division
  - 6 May 1945
    - 3× Ki-43 III; Allied ship West of Okinawa Island.
  - 11 May 1945
    - 2× Ki-43 III; Allied ship West of Okinawa Island.
  - 25 May 1945
    - 2× Ki-43 III; Allied ship West of Okinawa Island.
- Shinbu Unit No. 50, "Yamabuki Unit" (第五十振武隊 山吹隊,, Dai 50 Shinbu-tai, "Yamabuki-tai")
  - Original unit; Akeno Instructing Flying Division
  - 20 May 1945
    - 9× Ki-43 III; Allied ship West of Okinawa Island.
  - 25 May 1945
    - 2× Ki-43 III; Allied ship West of Okinawa Island.
  - 28 May 1945
    - 1× Ki-43 III; Allied ship West of Okinawa Island.
- Shinbu Unit No. 51, "Yūkyū Unit" (第五十一振武隊 悠久隊,, Dai 51 Shinbu-tai, "Yūkyū-tai")
  - Original unit; Akeno Instructing Flying Division
  - 6 May 1945
    - 1× Ki-43 III; Allied ship West of Okinawa Island.
  - 11 May 1945
    - 7× Ki-43 III; Allied ship West of Okinawa Island.
  - 28 May 1945
    - 1× Ki-43 III; Alliedship West of Okinawa Island.
- Shinbu Unit No. 52 (第五十二振武隊,, Dai 52 Shinbu-tai)
  - Original unit; Hitachi Instructing Flying Division
  - 11 May 1945
    - 3× Ki-43 III; Allied ship West of Okinawa Island.
  - 25 May 1945
    - 5× Ki-43 III; Allied ship West of Okinawa Island.
  - 28 May 1945
    - 3× Ki-43 III; Allied ship West of Okinawa Island.
- Shinbu Unit No. 53, "Tenchū Unit" (第五十三振武隊 天誅隊,, Dai 53 Shinbu-tai, "Tenchū-tai")
  - Original unit; Hitachi Instructing Flying Division
  - 18 May 1945
    - 8× Ki-43 III; Allied ship West of Okinawa Island.
  - 8 June 1945
    - 1× Ki-43 III; Allied ship West of Okinawa Island.
- Shinbu Unit No. 54 (第五十四振武隊,, Dai 54 Shinbu-tai)
  - Original unit; Akeno Instructing Flying Division
  - 25 May 1945
    - 6× Ki-61 Id; Allied ship West of Okinawa Island.
  - 28 May 1945
    - 3× Ki-61 Id; Allied ship West of Okinawa Island.
  - 6 June 1945
    - 1× Ki-61 Id; Allied ship West of Okinawa Island.
- Shinbu Unit No. 55 (第五十五振武隊,, Dai 55 Shinbu-tai)
  - Original unit; Akeno Instructing Flying Division
  - 6 May 1945
    - 3× Ki-61 Id; Allied ship West of Okinawa Island.
  - 11 May 1945
    - 3× Ki-61 Id; Allied ship West of Okinawa Island.
  - 25 May 1945
    - 2× Ki-61 Id; Allied ship West of Okinawa Island.
  - 28 May 1945
    - 1× Ki-61 Id; Allied ship West of Okinawa Island.
- Shinbu Unit No. 56 (第五十六振武隊,, Dai 56 Shinbu-tai)
  - Original unit; Hitachi Instructing Flying Division
  - 6 May 1945
    - 4× Ki-61 Id; Allied ship West of Okinawa Island.
  - 11 May 1945
    - 3× Ki-61 Id; Allied ship West of Okinawa Island.
  - 25 May 1945
    - 2× Ki-61 Id; Allied ship West of Okinawa Island.
  - 11 June 1945
    - 1× Ki-61 Id; Allied ship West of Okinawa Island.
- Shinbu Unit No. 57 (第五十七振武隊,, Dai 57 Shinbu-tai)
  - Original unit; Akeno Instructing Flying Division
  - 25 May 1945
    - 10× Ki-84 I; Allied ship West of Okinawa Island.
- Shinbu Unit No. 58, "Dokuro Unit" (第五十八振武隊 髑髏隊,, Dai 58 Shinbu-tai, "Dokuro-tai")
  - Original unit; Akeno Instructing Flying Division
  - 25 May 1945
    - 9× Ki-84 I; Allied ship West of Okinawa Island.
  - 28 May 1945
    - 1× Ki-84 I; Allied ship West of Okinawa Island.
- Shinbu Unit No. 59 (第五十九振武隊,, Dai 59 Shinbu-tai)
  - Original unit; Akeno Instructing Flying Division
  - 28 May 1945
    - 3× Ki-84 I; Allied ship West of Okinawa Island.
  - 8 June 1945
    - 6× Ki-84 I; Allied ship West of Okinawa Island.
- Shinbu Unit No. 60 (第六十振武隊,, Dai 60 Shinbu-tai)
  - Original unit; Akeno Instructing Flying Division
  - 4 May 1945
    - 6× Ki-84 I; Allied ship West of Okinawa Island.
  - 11 May 1945
    - 3× Ki-84 I; Allied ship West of Okinawa Island.
  - 25 May 1945
    - 1× Ki-84 I; Allied ship West of Okinawa Island.
- Shinbu Unit No. 61 (第六十一振武隊,, Dai 61 Shinbu-tai)
  - Original unit; Hitachi Instructing Flying Division
  - 28 April 1945
    - 7× Ki-84 I; Allied ship West of Okinawa Island.
  - 11 May 1945
    - 3× Ki-84 I; Allied ship West of Okinawa Island.
  - 25 May 1945
    - 1× Ki-84 I; Allied ship West of Okinawa Island.
- Shinbu Unit No. 62, "Shiraume Unit" (第六十二振武隊,, Dai 62 Shinbu-tai, "Shiraume-tai")
  - Original unit; Shimoshizu Instructing Flying Division
  - 3 April 1945
    - 1× Ki-51; Allied ship West of Okinawa Island.
  - 6 April 1945
    - 4× Ki-51; Allied ship West of Okinawa Island.
  - 12 April 1945
    - 2× Ki-51; Allied ship West of Okinawa Island.
- Shinbu Unit No. 63 (第六十三振武隊,, Dai 63 Shinbu-tai)
  - Original unit; Hokota Instructing Flying Division
  - 7 June 1945
    - 6× Ki-51; Allied ship West of Okinawa Island.
- Shinbu Unit No. 64, "Kokka Unit" (第六十四振武隊 國華隊,, Dai 64 Shinbu-tai, "Kokka-tai")
  - Original unit; Hokota Instructing Flying Division
  - 11 June 1945
    - 9× Ki-51; Allied ship West of Okinawa Island.
- Shinbu Unit No. 65 (第六十五振武隊,, Dai 65 Shinbu-tai)
  - Original unit; Akeno Instructing Flying Division
  - 11 May 1945
    - 3× Ki-27; Allied ship West of Okinawa Island.
- Shinbu Unit No. 66 (第六十六振武隊,, Dai 66 Shinbu-tai)
  - Original unit; Akeno Instructing Flying Division
  - 4 May 1945
    - 3× Ki-27; Allied ship West of Okinawa Island.
  - 25 May 1945
    - 2× Ki-27; Allied ship West of Okinawa Island.
- Shinbu Unit No. 67 (第六十七振武隊,, Dai 67 Shinbu-tai)
  - Original unit; Akeno Instructing Flying Division
  - 28 April 1945
    - 6× Ki-27; Allied ship West of Okinawa Island.
- Shinbu Unit No. 68 (第六十八振武隊,, Dai 68 Shinbu-tai)
  - Original unit; Akeno Instructing Flying Division
  - 8 April 1945
    - 2× Ki-27; Allied ship West of Okinawa Island.
  - 9 April 1945
    - 1× Ki-27; Allied ship off Okinawa Island.
- Shinbu Unit No. 69 (第六十九振武隊,, Dai 69 Shinbu-tai)
  - Original unit; Akeno Instructing Flying Division
  - 12 April 1945
    - 3× Ki-27; Allied ship West of Okinawa Island.
  - 16 April 1945
    - 1× Ki-27; Allied ship West of Okinawa Island.
- Shinbu Unit No. 70 (第七十振武隊,, Dai 70 Shinbu-tai)
  - Original unit; First Army Air Force, 53rd Air Division
  - 11 May 1945
    - 3× Ki-43 III; Allied ship West of Okinawa Island.
  - 25 May 1945
    - 3× Ki-43 III; Allied ship West of Okinawa Island.
  - 28 May 1945
    - 3× Ki-43 III; Allied ship West of Okinawa Island.
- Shinbu Unit No. 71 (第七十一振武隊,, Dai 71 Shinbu-tai)
  - Original unit; First Army Air Force
  - Ki-51; No-sorties or unfinished organization.

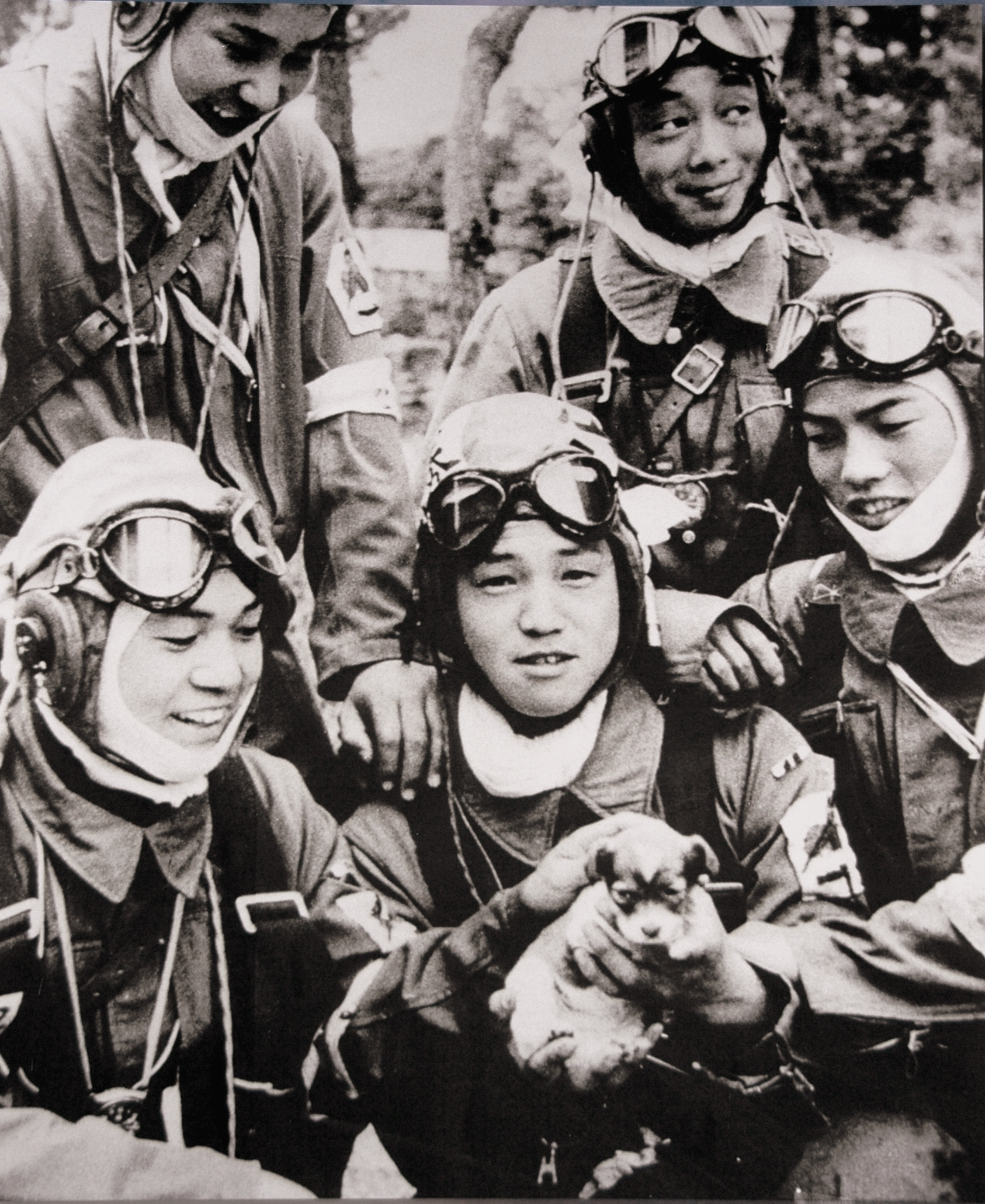
Shinbu Unit No. 72 pilots, 26 May 1945.

- Shinbu Unit No. 72 (第七十二振武隊,, Dai 72 Shinbu-tai)
  - Original unit; First Army Air Force, 53rd Air Division
  - 27 May 1945
    - 9× Ki-51; Allied ship South of Okinawa Island.
- Shinbu Unit No. 73 (第七十三振武隊,, Dai 73 Shinbu-tai)
  - Original unit; First Army Air Force, 53rd Air Division
  - 6 April 1945
    - 12× Ki-51; Allied ship West of Okinawa Island.
- Shinbu Unit No. 74 (第七十四振武隊,, Dai 74 Shinbu-tai)
  - Original unit; First Army Air Force, 53rd Air Division
  - 7 April 1945
    - 7× Ki-51; Allied ship West of Okinawa Island.
  - 12 April 1945
    - 1× Ki-51; Allied ship West of Okinawa Island.
  - 13 April 1945
    - 4× Ki-51; Allied ship West of Okinawa Island.
- Shinbu Unit No. 75 (第七十五振武隊,, Dai 75 Shinbu-tai)
  - Original unit; First Army Air Force, 53rd Air Division
  - 7 April 1945
    - 4× Ki-51; Allied ship in Nakagusuku Bay.
  - 12 April 1945
    - 4× Ki-51; Allied ship West of Okinawa Island.
  - 13 April 1945
    - 1× Ki-51; Allied ship West of Okinawa Island.
  - 16 April 1945
    - 1× Ki-51; Allied ship West of Okinawa Island.
- Shinbu Unit No. 76 (第七十六振武隊,, Dai 76 Shinbu-tai)
  - Original unit; First Army Air Force, 51st Air Division
  - 28 April 1945
    - 6× Ki-27; Allied ship West of Okinawa Island.
  - 11 May 1945
    - 3× Ki-27; Allied convoy off Kadena.
- Shinbu Unit No. 77 (第七十七振武隊,, Dai 77 Shinbu-tai)
  - Original unit; First Army Air Force
  - 28 April 1945
    - 6× Ki-27; Allied ship West of Okinawa Island.
  - 29 April 1945
    - 1× Ki-27; Allied ship West of Okinawa Island.
  - 4 May 1945
    - 1× Ki-27; Allied convoy off Kadena.
- Shinbu Unit No. 78, "Ōka Unit" (第七十八振武隊 櫻花隊,, Dai 78 Shinbu-tai, "Ōka-tai")
  - Original unit; First Army Air Force, 51st Air Division, 40th Educational Squadron
  - 4 May 1945
    - 6× Ki-27; Allied ship West of Okinawa Island.
  - 11 May 1945
    - 1× Ki-27; Allied ship West of Okinawa Island.
  - 25 May 1945
    - 3× Ki-27; Allied ship West of Okinawa Island.
  - 26 May 1945
    - 1× Ki-27; Allied ship West of Okinawa Island.
- Shinbu Unit No. 79 (第七十九振武隊,, Dai 79 Shinbu-tai)
  - Original unit; 1st Army Air Force
  - 16 April 1945
    - 10× Ki-36; Allied ship West of Okinawa Island.
  - 22 April 1945
    - 1× Ki-36; Allied ship West of Okinawa Island.
- Shinbu Unit No. 80 (第八十振武隊,, Dai 80 Shinbu-tai)
  - Original unit; First Army Air Force, 52nd Air Division
  - 22 April 1945
    - 11× Ki-55; Allied ship West of Okinawa Island.
  - 27 April 1945
    - 1× Ki-55; Allied ship West of Okinawa Island.
- Shinbu Unit No. 81 (第八十一振武隊,, Dai 81 Shinbu-tai)
  - Original unit; First Army Air Force, 52nd Air Division
  - 22 April 1945
    - 11× Ki-55; Allied ship in Nago Bay.
  - 26 April 1945
    - 1× Ki-55; Allied ship West of Okinawa Island.
- Shinbu Unit No. 82 (第八十二振武隊,, Dai 82 Shinbu-tai)
  - Original unit; First Army Air Force
  - Ki-55; No-sorties or unfinished organization.
- Shinbu Unit No. 83 (第八十三振武隊,, Dai 83 Shinbu-tai)
  - Original unit; First Army Air Force
  - Ki-55; No-sorties or unfinished organization.
- Shinbu Unit No. 84 (第八十四振武隊,, Dai 84 Shinbu-tai)
  - Original unit; First Army Air Force
  - Ki-55; No-sorties or unfinished organization.
- Shinbu Unit No. 85 (第八十五振武隊,, Dai 85 Shinbu-tai)
  - Original unit; First Army Air Force
  - Ki-55; No-sorties or unfinished organization.
- Shinbu Unit No. 86 (第八十六振武隊,, Dai 86 Shinbu-tai)
  - Original unit; First Army Air Force
  - Ki-55; No-sorties or unfinished organization.
- Shinbu Unit No. 87 (第八十七振武隊,, Dai 87 Shinbu-tai)
  - Original unit; First Army Air Force
  - Ki-55; No-sorties or unfinished organization.
- Shinbu Unit No. 88 (第八十八振武隊,, Dai 88 Shinbu-tai)
  - Original unit; First Army Air Force
  - Ki-55; No-sorties or unfinished organization.
- Shinbu Unit No. 89 (第八十九振武隊,, Dai 89 Shinbu-tai)
  - Original unit; First Army Air Force
  - Ki-9; No-sorties or unfinished organization.
- Shinbu Unit No. 90 (第九十振武隊,, Dai 90 Shinbu-tai)
  - Original unit; First Army Air Force
  - Ki-9; No-sorties or unfinished organization.
- Shinbu Unit No. 91 (第九十一振武隊,, Dai 91 Shinbu-tai)
  - Original unit; First Army Air Force
  - Ki-9; No-sorties or unfinished organization.
- Shinbu Unit No. 92 (第九十二振武隊,, Dai 92 Shinbu-tai)
  - Original unit; First Army Air Force
  - Ki-9; No-sorties or unfinished organization.
- Shinbu Unit No. 93 (第九十三振武隊,, Dai 93 Shinbu-tai)
  - Original unit; First Army Air Force
  - Ki-9; No-sorties or unfinished organization.
- Shinbu Unit No. 94 (第九十四振武隊,, Dai 94 Shinbu-tai)
  - Original unit; First Army Air Force
  - Ki-9; No-sorties or unfinished organization.
- Shinbu Unit No. 95 (第九十五振武隊,, Dai 95 Shinbu-tai)
  - Original unit; First Army Air Force
  - Ki-9; No-sorties or unfinished organization.
- Shinbu Unit No. 96 (第九十六振武隊,, Dai 96 Shinbu-tai)
  - Original unit; First Army Air Force
  - Ki-9; No-sorties or unfinished organization.
- Shinbu Unit No. 97 (第九十七振武隊,, Dai 97 Shinbu-tai)
  - Original unit; First Army Air Force
  - Ki-9; No-sorties or unfinished organization.
- Shinbu Unit No. 98 (第九十八振武隊,, Dai 98 Shinbu-tai)
  - Original unit; First Army Air Force
  - Ki-9; No-sorties or unfinished organization.
- Shinbu Unit No. 99 (第九十九振武隊,, Dai 99 Shinbu-tai)
  - Original unit; First Army Air Force
  - Ki-9; No-sorties or unfinished organization.
- Shinbu Unit No. 100 (第百振武隊,, Dai 100 Shinbu-tai)
  - Original unit; First Army Air Force
  - Ki-9; No-sorties or unfinished organization.
- Shinbu Unit No. 101 (第百一振武隊,, Dai 101 Shinbu-tai)
  - Original unit; First Army Air Force
  - Ki-9; No-sorties or unfinished organization.
- Shinbu Unit No. 102, "Kōma Unit No. 1" (第百二振武隊 第一降魔隊,, Dai 102 Shinbu-tai, "Dai 1 Kōma-tai")
  - Original unit; Second Army Air Force
  - 12 April 1945
    - 11× Ki-51; Allied ship West of Okinawa Island.
  - 28 April 1945
    - 1× Ki-51; Allied ship West of Okinawa Island.
- Shinbu Unit No. 103, "Kōma Unit No. 2" (第百三振武隊 第二降魔隊,, Dai 103 Shinbu-tai, "Dai 2 Kōma-tai")
  - Original unit; Second Army Air Force
  - 12 April 1945
    - 11× Ki-51; Allied ship West of Okinawa Island.
  - 13 April 1945
    - 1× Ki-51; Allied ship West of Okinawa Island.
  - 23 April 1945
    - 1× Ki-51; Allied ship West of Okinawa Island.
- Shinbu Unit No. 104, "Kōma Unit No. 3" (第百四振武隊 第三降魔隊,, Dai 104 Shinbu-tai, "Dai 3 Kōma-tai")
  - Original unit; Second Army Air Force
  - 12 April 1945
    - 4× Ki-51; Allied ship West of Okinawa Island.
  - 13 April 1945
    - 5× Ki-51; Allied ship West of Okinawa Island.
  - 6 June 1945
    - 1× Ki-51; Allied ship West of Okinawa Island.
- Shinbu Unit No. 105, "Kōma Unit No. 4" (第百五振武隊 第四降魔隊,, Dai 105 Shinbu-tai, "Dai 4 Kōma-tai")
  - Original unit; Second Army Air Force
  - 22 April 1945
    - 6× Ki-27; Allied ship West of Okinawa Island.
    - 1× Ki-27; Allied ship West of Tokunoshima.
  - 23 April 1945
    - 1× Ki-27; Allied ship West of Okinawa Island.
  - 4 May 1945
    - 2× Ki-27; Allied ship West of Okinawa Island.
  - 25 May 1945
    - 2× Ki-27; Allied ship West of Okinawa Island.
- Shinbu Unit No. 106, "Kōma Unit No. 5 [Byakko Unit]" (第百六振武隊 第五降魔隊 [白虎隊],, Dai 106 Shinbu-tai, "Dai 5 Kōma-tai", [Byakko-tai])
  - Original unit; Second Army Air Force
  - 16 April 1945
    - 9× Ki-27; Allied ship West of Okinawa Island.
  - 28 April 1945
    - 3× Ki-27; Allied ship West of Okinawa Island.
  - 4 May 1945
    - 1× Ki-27; Allied ship West of Okinawa Island.
- Shinbu Unit No. 107, "Kōma Unit No. 6" (第百七振武隊 第六降魔隊,, Dai 107 Shinbu-tai, "Dai 6 Kōma-tai")
  - Original unit; Second Army Air Force
  - 13 April 1945
    - 5× Ki-27; Allied ship West of Okinawa Island.
  - 16 April 1945
    - 9× Ki-27; Allied ship West of Okinawa Island.
- Shinbu Unit No. 108, "Kōma Unit No. 7" (第百八振武隊 第七降魔隊,, Dai 108 Shinbu-tai, "Dai 7 Kōma-tai")
  - Original unit; Second Army Air Force
  - 16 April 1945
    - 11× Ki-27; Allied ship West of Okinawa Island.
  - 28 April 1945
    - 1× Ki-27; Allied ship West of Okinawa Island.
- Shinbu Unit No. 109, "Kōma Unit No. 8" (第百九振武隊 第八降魔隊,, Dai 109 Shinbu-tai, "Dai 8 Kōma-tai")
  - Original unit; Second Army Air Force, 42nd Educational Squadron
  - 22 April 1945
    - 4× Ki-27; Allied ship West of Okinawa Island.
  - 27 April 1945
    - 1× Ki-27; Allied ship West of Okinawa Island.
  - 28 April 1945
    - 2× Ki-27; Allied ship West of Okinawa Island.
  - 4 May 1945
    - 1× Ki-27; Allied ship West of Okinawa Island.
- Shinbu Unit No. 110, "Keppū Unit" (第百十振武隊 血風隊,, Dai 110 Shinbu-tai, "Keppū-tai")
  - Original unit; Fifth Army Air Force, 5th Learning Squadron
  - 26 May 1945
    - 7× Ki-61; Allied ship West of Okinawa Island.
- Shinbu Unit No. 111, "Wakazakura Unit" (第百十一振武隊 若櫻隊,, Dai 111 Shinbu-tai, "Wakazakura-tai")
  - Original unit; Fifth Army Air Force, 14th Educational Squadron
  - 3 June 1945
    - 8× Ki-27; Allied ship West of Okinawa Island.
- Shinbu Unit No. 112, "Hissatsu Unit" (第百十二振武隊 必殺隊,, Dai 112 Shinbu-tai, "Hissatsu-tai")
  - Original unit; Fifth Army Air Force, 18th Educational Squadron
  - 3 June 1945
    - 9× Ki-27; Allied ship West of Okinawa Island.
  - 10 June 1945
    - 2× Ki-27; Allied ship West of Okinawa Island.
- Shinbu Unit No. 113, "Tenken Unit" (第百十三振武隊 天剣隊,, Dai 113 Shinbu-tai, "Tenken-tai")
  - Original unit; Fifth Army Air Force, 28th Educational Squadron
  - 6 June 1945
    - 10× Ki-79b; Allied ship West of Okinawa Island.
- Shinbu Unit No. 114 (第百十四振武隊,, Dai 114 Shinbu-tai)
  - Original unit; 8th Flying Division
  - Ki-45 Kai; No-sorties or unfinished organization.
- Shinbu Unit No. 115 (第百十五振武隊,, Dai 115 Shinbu-tai)
  - Original unit; 8th Flying Division
  - Ki-27; No-sorties or unfinished organization.
- Shinbu Unit No. 116 (第百十六振武隊,, Dai 116 Shinbu-tai)
  - Original unit; 8th Flying Division
  - Ki-27; No-sorties or unfinished organization.
- Shinbu Unit No. 141 (第百四十一振武隊,, Dai 141 Shinbu-tai)
  - Original unit; Akeno Instructing Flying Division
  - 8 June 1945
    - 2× Ki-43 III; Allied ship West of Okinawa Island.
- Shinbu Unit No. 144 (第百四十四振武隊,, Dai 144 Shinbu-tai)
  - Original unit; Akeno Instructing Flying Division
  - 8 June 1945
    - 2× Ki-43 III; Allied ship West of Okinawa Island.
  - 11 June 1945
    - 1× Ki-43 III; Allied ship West of Okinawa Island.
- Shinbu Unit No. 159 (第百五十九振武隊,, Dai 159 Shinbu-tai)
  - Original unit; Fourth Army Air Force, 30th Fighter Corps
  - 6 June 1945
    - 5× Ki-61 I; Allied ship West of Okinawa Island.
  - 11 June 1945
    - 1× Ki-61 I; Allied ship West of Okinawa Island.
- Shinbu Unit No. 160 (第百六十振武隊,, Dai 160 Shinbu-tai)
  - Original unit; Fourth Army Air Force, 30th Fighter Corps
  - 6 June 1945
    - 3× Ki-61 I; Allied ship West of Okinawa Island.
- Shinbu Unit No. 165 (第百六十五振武隊,, Dai 165 Shinbu-tai)
  - Original unit; Akeno Instructing Flying Division
  - 6 June 1945
    - 5× Ki-61 I; Allied ship West of Okinawa Island.
- Shinbu Unit No. No. 179, "Kenshō Unit" (第百七十九振武隊 顕正隊,, Dai 179 Shinbu-tai, "Kenshō-tai")
  - Original unit; Fourth Army Air Force, 30th Fighter Corps
  - 22 June 1945
    - 5× Ki-84 I; Allied ship West of Okinawa Island.
- Shinbu Unit No. No. 180, "Tenshō Unit" (第百八十振武隊 天翔隊,, Dai 180 Shinbu-tai, "Tenshō-tai")
  - Original unit; Fourth Army Air Force, 30th Fighter Corps
  - 1 July 1945
    - 2× Ki-84 I; Allied ship West of Okinawa Island.
- Shinbu Unit No. No. 213 (第二百十三振武隊,, Dai 213 Shinbu-tai)
  - Original unit; First Army Air Force, 51st Air Division, 1st Educational Squadron
  - 28 May 1945
    - 2× Ki-27; Allied ship West of Okinawa Island.
- Shinbu Unit No. No. 214 (第二百十四振武隊,, Dai 214 Shinbu-tai)
  - Original unit; 1st Army Air Force, 51st Air Division, 1st Educational Squadron
  - 3 June 1945
    - 4× Ki-27; Allied ship West of Okinawa Island.
  - 10 June 1945
    - 1× Ki-27; Allied ship West of Okinawa Island.
- Shinbu Unit No. No. 215 (第二百十五振武隊,, Dai 215 Shinbu-tai)
  - Original unit; 1st Army Air Force, 51st Air Division, 40th Educational Squadron
  - 11 June 1945
    - 1× Ki-27; Allied ship West of Okinawa Island.
- Shinbu Unit No. No. 431 (第四百三十一振武隊,, Dai 431 Shinbu-tai)
  - Original unit; 2nd Army Air Force
  - 27 May 1945
    - 5× Ki-27; Allied ship West of Okinawa Island.
  - 28 May 1945
    - 2× Ki-27; Allied ship West of Okinawa Island.
  - 3 June 1945
    - 1× Ki-27; Allied ship West of Okinawa Island.
- Shinbu Unit No. No. 432 (第四百三十二振武隊,, Dai 432 Shinbu-tai)
  - Original unit; 2nd Army Air Force
  - 25 May 1945
    - 2× Ki-79; Allied ship West of Okinawa Island.
  - 28 May 1945
    - 8× Ki-79; Allied ship West of Okinawa Island.
- Shinbu Unit No. No. 433 (第四百三十三振武隊,, Dai 433 Shinbu-tai)
  - Original unit; 2nd Army Air Force
  - 25 May 1945
    - 5× Ki-79; Allied ship West of Okinawa Island.
  - 28 May 1945
    - 5× Ki-79; Allied ship West of Okinawa Island.
  - 1 June 1945
    - 1× Ki-79; Allied ship West of Okinawa Island.

== Sei Squadron ==
- 15th Sei Squadron, "Byakko Unit" (誠第十五飛行隊 白虎隊,, Sei Dai 15 Hikōtai, "Byakko-tai")
  - Original unit; Hokota Instructing Flying Division
  - 31 May 1945
    - 1× Ki-48; Allied ship West of Okinawa Island.
- 16th Sei Squadron, "Genbu Unit" (誠第十六飛行隊 玄武隊,, Sei Dai 16 Hikōtai, "Genbu-tai")
  - Original unit; 2nd Army Air Force
  - 12 April 1945
    - 1× Ki-43; Allied carrier task force West of Hualien.
- 17th Sei Squadron (誠第十七飛行隊,, Sei Dai 17 Hikōtai)
  - Original unit; 8th Flying Division, 9th Flying Brigade
  - 26 March 1945
    - 4× Ki-51; Allied ship South-West of Naha, Okinawa|Naha.
  - 29 March 1945
    - 1× Ki-51; Allied ship off Okinawa Island.
  - 1 April 1945
    - 2× Ki-51; Allied ship West of Okinawa Island.
  - 8 April 1945
    - 1× Ki-51; Allied ship in Nakagusuku Bay.
  - 22 April 1945
    - 1× Ki-51; Allied ship West of Okinawa Island.
- 26th Sei Squadron (誠第二十六飛行隊,, Sei Dai 26 Hikōtai)
  - Original unit; 8th Flying Division, 22nd Flying Brigade, 20th Flying Regiment
  - 12 April 1945
    - 1× Ki-43; Allied carrier task force West of Hualien.
  - 13 May 1945
    - 3× Ki-43; Allied ship South-West of Naha.
  - 17 May 1945
    - 4× Ki-43; Allied ship East of Kerama Islands.
- 31st Sei Squadron, "Buyō Unit" (誠第三十一飛行隊 武揚隊,, Sei Dai 31 Hikōtai, "Buyō-tai")
  - Original unit; 2nd Army Air Force
  - 1 April 1945
    - 7× Ki-51; Allied ship West of Okinawa Island.
  - 13 May 1945
    - 3× Ki-51; Allied ship West of Okinawa Island.
  - 17 May 1945
    - 2× Ki-51; Allied ship West of Okinawa Island.
  - 19 July 1945
    - 1× Ki-51; Allied ship West of Okinawa Island.
- 32nd Sei Squadron, "Bukoku Unit" (誠第三十二飛行隊 武剋隊,, Sei Dai 32 Hikōtai, "Bukoku-tai")
  - Original unit; 2nd Army Air Force
  - 27 March 1945
    - 9× Ki-51; Allied ship North-East of Kerama Islands.
  - 3 April 1945
    - 6× Ki-51; Allied ship off Kadena.
- 33rd Sei Squadron (誠第三十三飛行隊,, Sei Dai 33 Hikōtai)
  - Original unit; Akeno Instructing Flying Division
  - 16 April 1945
    - 1× Ki-84; Allied ship off Kadena.
  - 27 April 1945
    - 5× Ki-84; Allied ship off Kadena.
  - 9 May 1945
    - 1× Ki-84; Allied ship West of Naha.
  - 9 June 1945
    - 1× Ki-84; Allied ship West of Okinawa Island.
- 34th Sei Squadron (誠第三十四飛行隊,, Sei Dai 34 Hikōtai)
  - Original unit; Akeno Instructing Flying Division
  - 28 April 1945
    - 4× Ki-84; Allied ship South of Kerama Islands.
  - 4 May 1945
    - 6× Ki-84; Allied ship off Kadena.
  - 9 May 1945
    - 1× Ki-84; Allied ship West of Naha.
- 35th Sei Squadron (誠第三十五飛行隊,, Sei Dai 35 Hikōtai)
  - Original unit; Hitachi Instructing Flying Division
  - 3 May 1945
    - 5× Ki-84; Allied ship West of Okinawa Island.
  - 9 May 1945
    - 3× Ki-84; Allied ship West of Naha.
- 36th Sei Squadron (誠第三十六飛行隊,, Sei Dai 36 Hikōtai)
  - Original unit; Tachiarai Army Flying School
  - 6 April 1945
    - 10× Ki-84; Allied ship West of Okinawa Island.
  - 16 April 1945
    - 1× Ki-84; Allied ship West of Okinawa Island.
  - 27 April 1945
    - 1× Ki-84; Allied ship West of Okinawa Island.
- 37th Sei Squadron (誠第三十七飛行隊,, Sei Dai 37 Hikōtai)
  - Original unit; Tachiarai Army Flying School
  - 6 April 1945
    - 9× Ki-36; Allied ship West of Okinawa Island.
- 38th Sei Squadron (誠第三十八飛行隊,, Sei Dai 38 Hikōtai)
  - Original unit; Tachiarai Army Flying School
  - 6 April 1945
    - 7× Ki-36; Allied ship West of Okinawa Island.
  - 16 April 1945
    - 1× Ki-36; Allied ship West of Okinawa Island.
- 39th Sei Squadron, "Sōryū Unit" (誠第三十九飛行隊 蒼龍隊,, Sei Dai 39 Hikōtai, "Sōryū-tai")
  - Original unit; 2nd Army Air Force
  - 31 March 1945
    - 3× Ki-43; Allied ship West of Okinawa Island.
  - 1 April 1945
    - 6× Ki-43; Allied ship West of Okinawa Island.
- 41st Sei Squadron, "Fuyō Unit" (誠第四十一飛行隊 扶揺隊,, Sei Dai 41 Hikōtai, "Fuyō-tai")
  - Original unit; 2nd Army Air Force
  - 29 March 1945
    - 3× Ki-27; Allied ship West of Kadena.
  - 11 May 1945
    - 1× Ki-27; Allied ship West of Okinawa Island.
- 71st Sei Squadron (誠第七十一飛行隊,, Sei Dai 71 Hikōtai)
  - Original unit; 1st Army Air Force
  - 29 March 1945
    - 6× Ki-51; Allied ship West of Okinawa Island.
  - 19 June 1945
    - 1× Ki-51; Allied ship West of Okinawa Island.
- 114th Sei Squadron (誠第百十四飛行隊,, Sei Dai 114 Hikōtai)
  - Original unit; 1st Army Air Force
  - 2 April 1945
    - 8× Ki-45 Kai; Allied ship West of Kerama Islands.
- 116th Sei Squadron (誠第百十六飛行隊,, Sei Dai 116 Hikōtai)
  - Original unit; 8th Flying Division
  - 28 April 1945
    - 1× Ki-27; Allied ship west in Kerama Bay.
- 119th Sei Squadron (誠第百十九飛行隊,, Sei Dai 119 Hikōtai)
  - Original unit; 8th Flying Division
  - 22 April 1945
    - 5× Ki-45 Kai; Allied ship South-West of Aguni Island.
  - 28 April 1945
    - 4× Ki-45 Kai; Allied ship West of Kume Island.
- 120th Sei Squadron (誠第百二十飛行隊,, Sei Dai 120 Hikōtai)
  - Original unit; 8th Flying Division
  - 4 May 1945
    - 3× Ki-84; Allied ship West of Kume Island.
  - 12 May 1945
    - 2× Ki-84; Allied ship West of Kerama Islands.
- 123rd Sei Squadron (誠第百二十三飛行隊,, Sei Dai 123 Hikōtai)
  - Original unit; 8th Flying Division
  - 3 May 1945
    - 1× Ki-45 Kai; Allied ship West of Okinawa Island.
  - 4 May 1945
    - 1× Ki-45 Kai; Allied ship off Kadena.
  - 9 May 1945
    - 1× Ki-45 Kai; Allied ship West of Naha.
  - 12 May 1945
    - 1× Ki-45 Kai; Allied ship West of Kerama Islands.

== Shinshō Unit ==
- Shinshō Attack Unit (神翔攻撃隊,, Shinshō Kōgekitai)
  - Original unit; 3rd Army Air Force, 58th Flying Regiment
  - 11 April 1945
    - 2× Ki-51; British ship off Nicobar Islands.
- Shinshō Unit, 1st Kōjun Unit (神翔隊 第一皇楯隊,, Shinshō-tai, Dai 1 Kōjun-tai)
  - Original unit; 3rd Army Air Force, 58th Flying Regiment
  - Ki-67; No-sorties.
- Shinshō Unit, 2nd Kōjun Unit (神翔隊 第二皇楯隊,, Shinshō-tai, Dai 2 Kōjun-tai)
  - Original unit; 3rd Army Air Force, 1st Field Supply Squadron
  - Ki-67; No-sorties.

== Shichisei Unit ==
- Shichisei Shinchū Unit (七生盡忠隊,, Shichisei Shinchū-tai)
  - Original unit; 3rd Army Air Force, 8th Flying Regiment
  - Ki-48; No-sorties.
- Shichisei Shōki Unit (七生翔輝隊,, Shichisei Shōki-tai)
  - Original unit; 3rd Army Air Force, 21st Flying Regiment
  - 24 January 1945
    - Ki-45 Kai; British carrier task force off Sumatra, mission failed and aircraft returned to base.
- Shichisei Shōju Unit (七生翔寿隊,, Shichisei Shōju-tai)
  - Original unit; 3rd Army Air Force, 26th Flying Regiment
  - 24 January 1945
    - Ki-43; British carrier task force off Sumatra, mission failed and aircraft returned to base.
- Shichisei Junkoku Unit (七生殉國隊,, Shichisei Junkoku-tai)
  - Original unit; 3rd Army Air Force, 64th Flying Regiment
  - Ki-43; No-sorties.
- Shichisei Kyokkō Unit (七生旭光隊,, Shichisei Kyokkō-tai)
  - Original unit; 3rd Army Air Force, 44th Independent Chūtai
  - Ki-51; No-sorties.
- Shichisei Shōken Unit (七生翔顕隊,, Shichisei Shōken-tai)
  - Original unit; 3rd Army Air Force, 71st Independent Chūtai
  - 1 March 1945
    - 1× Ki-43; British ship off Nicobar Islands.
- Shichisei Kōjun Unit, 1st Squadron (七生皇楯第一飛行隊,, Shichisei Kōjun Dai 1 Hikōtai)
  - Original unit; 3rd Army Air Force, 58th Flying Regiment
  - 24 January 1945
    - Ki-67; British carrier task force off Sumatra, mission failed and aircraft returned to base.
- Shichisei Kōjun Unit, 2nd Squadron (七生皇楯第二飛行隊,, Shichisei Kōjun Dai 2 Hikōtai)
  - Original unit; 3rd Army Air Force, 1st Field Supply Squadron
  - 24 January 1945
    - 5 (?)× Ki-67; British carrier task force off Sumatra.
- Shichisei Kōjun Unit, 3rd Squadron (七生皇楯第三飛行隊,, Shichisei Kōjun Dai 3 Hikōtai)
  - Original unit; 3rd Army Air Force, 1st Field Supply Squadron
  - Ki-48; No-sorties.
- Shichisei Shōbu Unit (七生昭武隊,, Shichisei Shōbu-tai)
  - Original unit; 3rd Army Air Force, 17th Educational Squadron
  - 28 June 1945
    - 1× Ki-27; Allied submarine near Jakarta.
- Shichisei Jinrai Unit (七生神雷隊,, Shichisei Jinrai-tai)
  - Original unit; 3rd Army Air Force, 61st Flying Regiment
  - 19 June 1945
    - 8× Ki-67; British ship off Balikpapan.
- Shichisei Ichisei Unit (七生一誠隊,, Shichisei Ichisei-tai)
  - Original unit; 3rd Army Air Force, 83rd Flying Regiment
  - Ki-51; No-sorties.
- Shichisei Shōdō Unit (七生昭道隊,, Shichisei Shōdō-tai)
  - Original unit; 3rd Army Air Force, 3rd Educational Squadron
  - 25 July 1945
    - 9× Ki-51; British carrier task force off Phuket
- Shichisei Shōretsu Unit (七生昭烈隊,, Shichisei Shōretsu-tai)
  - Original unit; 3rd Army Air Force, 12th Educational Squadron
  - No-sorties.
- Shichisei Shōkyū Unit (七生昭久隊,, Shichisei Shōkyū-tai)
  - Original unit; 3rd Army Air Force, 26th Educational Squadron
  - No-sorties.
- Shichisei Shōten Unit (七生昭天隊,, Shichisei Shōten-tai)
  - Original unit; 3rd Army Air Force, 35th Educational Squadron
  - No-sorties.
- Shichisei Shōgi Unit (七生昭義隊,, Shichisei Shōgi-tai)
  - Original unit; 3rd Army Air Force, 44th Educational Squadron
  - No-sorties.
- Shichisei Shōsetsu Unit (七生昭節隊,, Shichisei Shōsetsu-tai)
  - Original unit; 3rd Army Air Force, 45th Educational Squadron
  - No-sorties.
- Shichisei Shōkoku Unit (七生昭國隊,, Shichisei Shōkoku-tai)
  - Original unit; 3rd Army Air Force, 1st Training Squadron
  - No-sorties.
- Shichisei Shōshin Unit (七生昭真隊,, Shichisei Shōshin-tai)
  - Original unit; 3rd Army Air Force, 2nd Training Squadron
  - No-sorties.
- Shichisei Shōjun Unit (七生昭純隊,, Shichisei Shōjun-tai)
  - Original unit; 3rd Army Air Force, 2nd Training Squadron
  - No-sorties.

== Shinshū Unit ==
- Shinshū Unit No. 201 (第二百一神鷲隊,, Dai 201 Shinshū-tai)
  - Original unit; Hokota Instructing Flying Division
  - 13 August 1945
    - 5× Ki-45 Kai; U.S. carrier task force East of Cape Inubō.
- Shinshū Unit No. 202 (第二百二神鷲隊,, Dai 202 Shinshū-tai)
  - Original unit; Hokota Instructing Flying Division
  - Ki-45 Kai; No-sorties.
- Shinshū Unit No. 203 (第二百三神鷲隊,, Dai 203 Shinshū-tai)
  - Original unit; Hokota Instructing Flying Division
  - Ki-45 Kai; No-sorties.
- Shinshū Unit No. 204 (第二百四神鷲隊,, Dai 204 Shinshū-tai)
  - Original unit; Hokota Instructing Flying Division
  - Ki-45 Kai; No-sorties.
- Shinshū Unit No. 205 (第二百五神鷲隊,, Dai 205 Shinshū-tai)
  - Original unit; Hokota Instructing Flying Division
  - Ki-45 Kai; No-sorties.
- Shinshū Unit No. 206 (第二百六神鷲隊,, Dai 206 Shinshū-tai)
  - Original unit; Hokota Instructing Flying Division
  - Ki-45 Kai; No-sorties.
- Shinshū Unit No. 207 (第二百七神鷲隊,, Dai 207 Shinshū-tai)
  - Original unit; Hokota Instructing Flying Division
  - Ki-45 Kai; No-sorties.
- Shinshū Unit No. 208 (第二百八神鷲隊,, Dai 208 Shinshū-tai)
  - Original unit; Hokota Instructing Flying Division
  - Ki-45 Kai; No-sorties.
- Shinshū Unit No. 253 (第二百五十三神鷲隊,, Dai 253 Shinshū-tai)
  - Original unit; 1st Army Air Force
  - Ki-48; No-sorties, all Ki-48s were lost by air raid in Nasu airfield on 13 August 1945.
- Shinshū Unit No. 255 (第二百五十五神鷲隊,, Dai 255 Shinshū-tai)
  - Original unit; 1st Army Air Force
  - 9 August 1945
    - 1× Ki-48; Allied ship off Kamaishi.
- Shinshū Unit No. 398 (第三百九十八神鷲隊,, Dai 398 Shinshū-tai)
  - Original unit; 10th Flying Division
  - 13 August 1945
    - 1× Ki-9; Allied ship South of Shimoda.

== Other named unit ==
- Banda Unit (万朶隊,, Banda-tai)
  - Original unit; Hokota Instructing Flying Division
  - 12 November 1944
    - 4× Ki-48 II Kai; U.S. convoy in Leyte Gulf.
  - 15 November 1944
    - 1× Ki-48 II Kai; U.S. convoy in Leyte Gulf.
  - 20 December 1944
    - 1× Ki-48 II Kai; U.S. convoy in Leyte Gulf.
- Fugaku Unit (富嶽隊,, Fugaku-tai)
  - Original unit; Hamamatsu Instructing Flying Division
  - 7 November 1944
    - 5× Ki-67 "To-Gō"; U.S. carrier task force East of Philippines.
  - 11 November 1944
    - 5× Ki-67 "To-Gō"; U.S. carrier task force East of Philippines.
  - 13 November 1944
    - 4× Ki-67 "To-Gō"; U.S. carrier task force East of Clark Air Base.
  - 15 November 1944
    - 3× Ki-67 "To-Gō"; U.S. ship South of Mindanao.
  - 16 December 1944
    - 1× Ki-67 "To-Gō"; U.S. ship South of Mindoro.
  - 9 January 1945
    - 2× Ki-67 "To-Gō"; U.S. convoy in Lingayen Gulf.
  - 10 January 1945
    - 1× Ki-67 "To-Gō"; U.S. convoy in Lingayen Gulf.
  - 11 January 1945
    - 1× Ki-67 "To-Gō"; U.S. convoy in Lingayen Gulf.
  - 12 January 1945
    - 1× Ki-67 "To-Gō"; U.S. convoy in Lingayen Gulf.
- Kikusui Unit (菊水隊,, Kikusui-tai)
  - Original unit; 5th Flying Division, 74th Flying Regiment, 95th Flying Regiment
  - 14 December 1944
    - 9× Ki-49; U.S. ship off Negros.
- Koizumi Unit (小泉隊,, Koizumi-tai)
  - Original unit; 83rd Flying Regiment
  - 21 December 1944
    - 1× Ki-51; U.S. ship off Bacolod.
  - 12 January 1945
    - 1× Ki-51; U.S. ship in Lingayen Gulf.
- Kyokkō Unit (旭光隊,, Kyokkō-tai)
  - Original unit; 75th Flying Regiment
  - 13 December 1944
    - ?× Ki-48 II; U.S. ship off Mindoro.
  - 15 December 1944
    - 1× Ki-48 II; U.S. ship off Mindoro.
  - 16 December 1944
    - 1× Ki-48 II; U.S. ship off Mindoro.
  - 21 December 1944
    - 1× Ki-48 II; U.S. ship off Bacolod.
  - 29 December 1944
    - 1× Ki-48 II; U.S. ship off Mindoro.
  - 6 January 1945
    - 1× Ki-48 II; U.S. ship in Lingayen Gulf.
  - 12 January 1945
    - 5× Ki-48 II; U.S. ship in Lingayen Gulf.
- Ōka Unit (皇華隊,, Ōka-tai)
  - Original unit; 45th Flying Regiment, 208th Flying Regiment
  - 30 December 1944
    - 1× Ki-45 Kai; U.S. ship off San Jose.
  - 4 January 1945
    - ?× Ki-45 Kai; U.S. ship off Mindoro.
  - 6 January 1945
    - 1× Ki-45 Kai; U.S. ship in Lingayen Gulf.
  - 9 January 1945
    - 1× Ki-45 Kai; U.S. ship in Lingayen Gulf.
  - 12 January 1945
    - 2× Ki-45 Kai; U.S. ship in Lingayen Gulf.
- Seika Unit (精華隊,, Seika-tai)
  - Original unit; 4th Army Air Force
  - 17 December 1944
    - 1× Ki-84 Ia; U.S. ship off Mindoro.
  - 20 December 1944
    - 2× Ki-84 Ia; U.S. ship off San Jose.
  - 25 December 1944
    - 1× Ki-84 Ia; U.S. ship in Lingayen Gulf.
  - 8 January 1945
    - 3× Ki-43 II; U.S. ship in Lingayen Gulf.
  - 10 January 1945
    - 4× Ki-43 II; U.S. ship in Lingayen Gulf.
  - 12 January 1945
    - 21× Ki-84 Ia; U.S. ship in Lingayen Gulf.
  - 13 January 1945
    - 2× Ki-84 Ia; U.S. ship in Lingayen Gulf.
- Sekishin Unit (赤心隊,, Sekishin-tai)
  - Original unit; 8th Army Air Force, 49th Independent Chūtai
  - 27 March 1945
    - 2× Ki-51; Allied ship West of Naha.
  - 28 March 1945
    - 5× Ki-51; Allied ship West of Kerama Islands.
- Wakazakura Unit (若櫻隊,, Wakazakura-tai)
  - Original unit; 75th Flying Regiment
  - 20 December 1944
    - 1× Ki-48 II; U.S. ship in Leyte Gulf.
  - 7 January 1945
    - 4× Ki-48 II; U.S. ship in Lingayen Gulf.

== Flying Regiment and other air unit ==
- 17th Flying Regiment (飛行第十七戦隊,, Hikō Dai 17 Sentai)
  - 1 April 1945
    - 7× Ki-61 I; Allied ship West of Okinawa Island.
  - 3 May 1945
    - 4× Ki-61 I; Allied ship off Kadena.
  - 5 June 1945
    - 4× Ki-61 I; Allied ship off Kadena.
- 19th Flying Regiment (飛行第十九戦隊,, Hikō Dai 19 Sentai)
  - 11 April 1945
    - 3× Ki-61 I; Allied ship West of Naha.
  - 18 April 1945
    - 2× Ki-61 I; Allied ship West of Naha.
  - 22 April 1945
    - 3× Ki-61 I; Allied ship in Kerama Bay.
  - 30 April 1945
    - 1× Ki-61 I; Allied ship West of Okinawa Island.
  - 4 May 1945
    - 2× Ki-61 I; Allied ship South of Miyako-jima.
  - 18 May 1945
    - 3× Ki-61 I; Allied ship West of Kadena.
  - 21 May 1945
    - 2× Ki-61 I; Allied ship West of Kadena.
- 20th Flying Regiment (飛行第二十戦隊,, Hikō Dai 20 Sentai)
  - 3 May 1945
    - 5× Ki-43; Allied ship off Kadena.
  - 29 May 1945
    - 5× Ki-43; Allied ship West of Okinawa Island.
  - 1 June 1945
    - 2× Ki-43; Allied ship West of Okinawa Island.
  - 6 June 1945
    - 4× Ki-43; Allied ship West of Kerama Islands.
- 29th Flying Regiment (飛行第二十九戦隊,, Hikō Dai 29 Sentai)
  - 21 May 1945
    - 3× Ki-84 I; Allied ship West of Okinawa Island.
  - 6 June 1945
    - 3× Ki-84 I; Allied ship West of Okinawa Island.
- 31st Flying Regiment (飛行第三十一戦隊,, Hikō Dai 31 Sentai)
  - 13 September 1944
    - 2× Ki-43; U.S. ship East of Leyte.
- 62nd Flying Regiment (飛行第六十二戦隊,, Hikō Dai 62 Sentai)
  - 2 April 1945
    - 1× Ki-67 "To-Gō", 1× Ki-167 "Sakura-dan"; Allied ship East of Kikai Island.
  - 25 May 1945
    - 3× Ki-67 "To-Gō", 1× Ki-167 "Sakura-dan"; Allied ship West of Naha.
- 66th Flying Regiment (飛行第六十六戦隊,, Hikō Dai 66 Sentai)
  - 2 April 1945
    - 1× Ki-51; Allied ship West of Okinawa Island.
- 105th Flying Regiment (飛行第百五戦隊,, Hikō Dai 105 Sentai)
  - 3 April 1945
    - 6× Ki-61 I; Allied ship South-West of Cape Zampa.
  - 9 April 1945
    - 1× Ki-61 I; Allied ship in Nakagusuku Bay.
  - 11 April 1945
    - 2× Ki-61 I; Allied ship in Nakagusuku Bay.
  - 12 April 1945
    - 1× Ki-61 I; Allied ship West of Taiwan.
  - 28 April 1945
    - 4× Ki-61 I; Allied ship South-West of Kerama Islands.
  - 4 May 1945
    - 2× Ki-61 I; Allied ship West of Kadena.
- 110th Flying Regiment (飛行第百十戦隊,, Hikō Dai 110 Sentai)
  - 25 April 1945
    - 4× Ki-67; Allied ship South-West of Kadena.
- 200th Flying Regiment (飛行第二百戦隊,, Hikō Dai 200 Sentai)
  - 18 November 1944
    - 4× Ki-84 I; U.S. ship in Leyte Gulf.
- 204th Flying Regiment (飛行第二百四戦隊,, Hikō Dai 204 Sentai)
  - 20 May 1945
    - 5× Ki-43; Allied ship West of Kadena.
  - 19 July 1945
    - 4× Ki-43; Allied ship West of Naha.
- 23rd Independent Chūtai (独立飛行第二十三中隊,, Dokuritsu Hikō Dai 23 Chūtai)
  - 26 March 1945
    - 6× Ki-61 I; Allied ship West of Naha.
  - 1 May 1945
    - 3× Ki-61 I; Allied ship off Kadena.
- 48th Independent Chūtai (独立飛行第四十八中隊,, Dokuritsu Hikō Dai 48 Chūtai)
  - 8 April 1945
    - 1× Ki-51; Allied ship off Nakagusuku Bay.
- 71st Independent Chūtai (独立飛行第七十一中隊,, Dokuritsu Hikō Dai 71 Chūtai)
  - 1 March 1945
    - 2× Ki-43; British ship off Sabang.
- 1st Field Supply Squadron (第一野戦補充飛行隊,, Dai 1 Yasen Hōju Hikōtai)
  - 19 October 1944
    - 9× Ki-43; British ship off Car Nicobar.

== Airborne and ground attack ==
- Kaoru Airborne Unit (薫空挺隊,, Kaoru Kūteitai)
  - Original unit; 4th Army Air Force, 208th Flying Regiment
  - 26 November 1944
    - 4× L2D (airborne); Burauen airfield.
- Takachiho Airborne Unit (高千穂空挺隊,, Takachiho Kūteitai)
  - Original unit; 1st Raiding Flying Regiment, 74th Flying Regiment, 95th Flying Regiment
  - 6 December 1944
    - 11× Ki-49 (bombing), 4× Ki-49 (airborne), 32× Ki-57 (airborne); Burauen airfield, Dulag airfield, San Pablo airfield and Tacloban airfield.
- Giretsu Airborne Unit (義烈空挺隊,, Giretsu Kūteitai)
  - Original unit; 1st Raiding Flying Regiment, 3rd Independent Squadron, 60th Flying Regiment
  - 24 May 1945
    - 12× Ki-21 (airborne), 1× Ki-67 (guidance); Yomitan airfield and Kadena airfield.
- Shinshūfumetsu Special Attack Unit (神州不滅特別攻撃隊,, Shinshūfumetsu Tokubetsu Kōgekitai)
  - Original unit; 2nd Army Air Force, 5th Training Squadron
  - 19 August 1945
    - 10× Ki-36/Ki-79; Soviet Red Army near Xinmin.

== Footnote ==
Notes

== See also ==
- Kamikaze
- Japanese Special Attack Units
- List of Imperial Japanese Navy air-to-surface special attack units

== Bibliography ==
- Kamikaze, 2005 Kazuhiko Osuo, Kōjinsha, Tōkyō, Japan ISBN 4-7698-1226-4.
- Shinbu, 2005, Kazuhiko Osuo, Kōjinsha, Tōkyō, JapanISBN 4-7698-1227-2.
- Makoto Ikuta (1977). Histories of Army Aerial Special Attack Unit. Tōkyō, Japan: Business-sha Co., Ltd.
- Navy Bomber "Ginga" [Frances]. Famous Airplanes of the World, Special Edition Vol. 1. Tōkyō: Bunrin-Dō Co., Ltd. 2000. ISBN 4-89319-081-4..
- No. 416, Special issue Medaled Pilots of Japanese Air Force in World War II, 1993. Model Art, Model Art Co. Ltd., Tōkyō, Japan.
- No. 439, Special issue Heroes of the Imperial Japanese Navy Air Force in 1937–1945, 1994. Model Art, Model Art Co. Ltd., Tōkyō, Japan.
- No. 451, Special issue Imperial Japanese Air Force Suicide Attack Unit, 1995. Model Art, Model Art Co. Ltd., Tōkyō, Japan.
- No. 458, Special issue Imperial Japanese Navy Air Force Suicide Attack Unit "Kamikaze", 1995. Model Art, Model Art Co. Ltd., Tōkyō, Japan.
- The Maru Special No. 108, Kamikaze Special Attack Forces, 1986. Ushio Shobō (Ushioshobokojinsha Co., Ltd.), Tōkyō, Japan.
- The Maru Mechanic No. 2, Type 3 Fighter 'Hien', 1977. Ushio Shobō (Ushioshobokojinsha Co., Ltd.), Tōkyō, Japan.
- Rekishi Dokuhon, Document of the war No. 42 Overview of Imperial Japanese Army Units, Shin-Jinbutsuoraisha Co., Ltd., Tōkyō, Japan, 1998, ISBN 4-404-02639-0.
