= 72nd Shinbu Squadron =

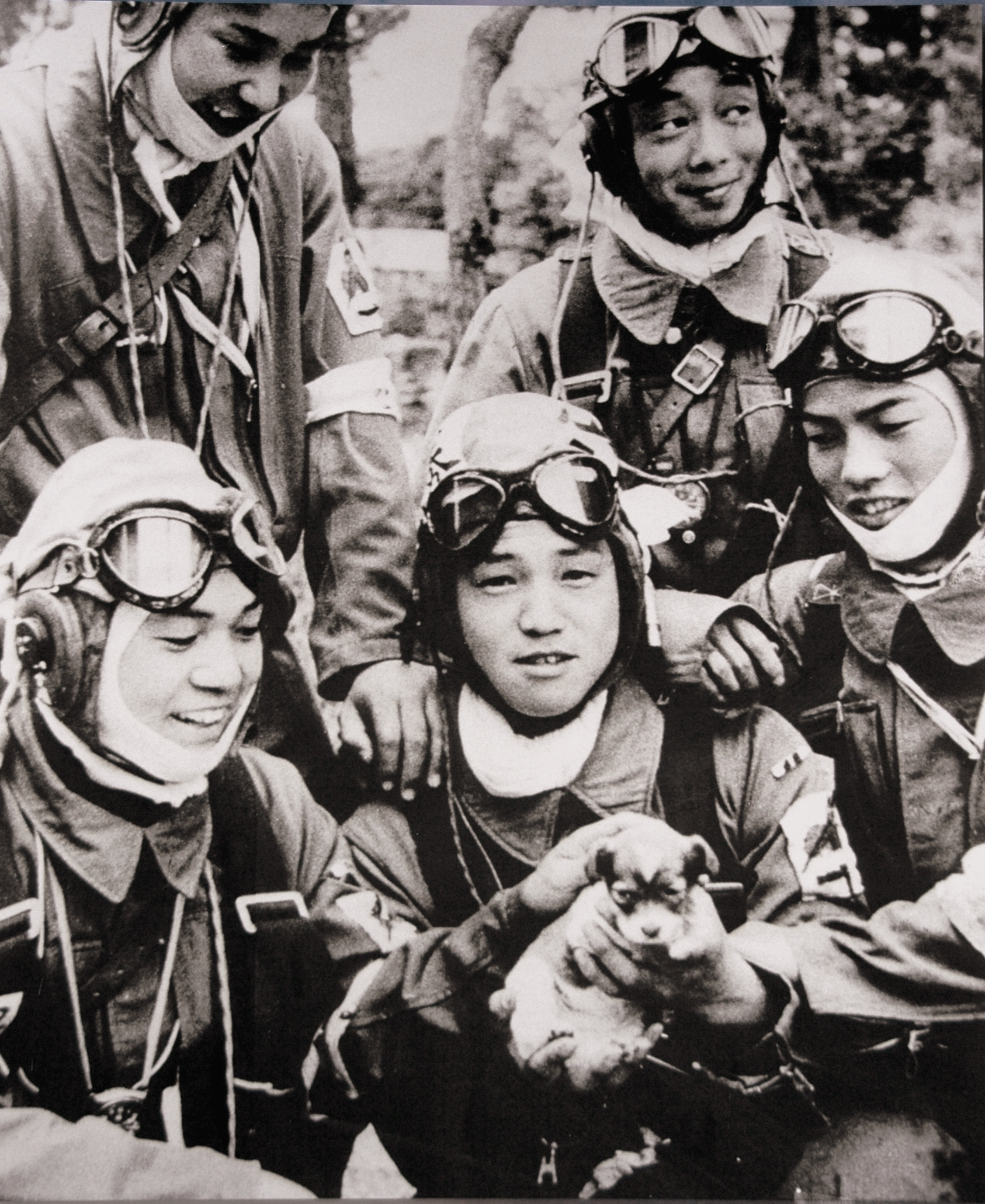
Members of the 72nd Shinbu Squadron the day before their mission. All five died.

The 72nd Shinbu Squadron (第72振武隊, Dai Nanajūni Shinbu-tai) of the Imperial Japanese Army Air Force was formed on January 30, 1945, as the 113 Educational Flight Corps. On March 30 of the same year the unit gained its final name, the 72nd Shinbu Squadron.

On May 25, 1945, the 72nd Shinbu Squadron departed from Metabaru Air Field to the secret air base at Bansei, which is now part of the city of Minamisatsuma (南さつま市) in Kagoshima Prefecture, located on the southwestern tip of Kyūshū. Two Type 99 assault planes of the 72nd Shinbu Squadron damaged American destroyer USS Braine, on which 66 men were killed and 78 wounded. Following the attacks the twelve men from the Squadron left for Korea to wait for orders.

== See also ==
- Yukio Araki (1928-1945)
- Bansei Tokkō Peace Museum
- Kamikaze
- Japanese Special Attack Units
- List of Imperial Japanese Army air-to-surface special attack units
