= Fudōshin =

Stable mental state in Japanese martial arts

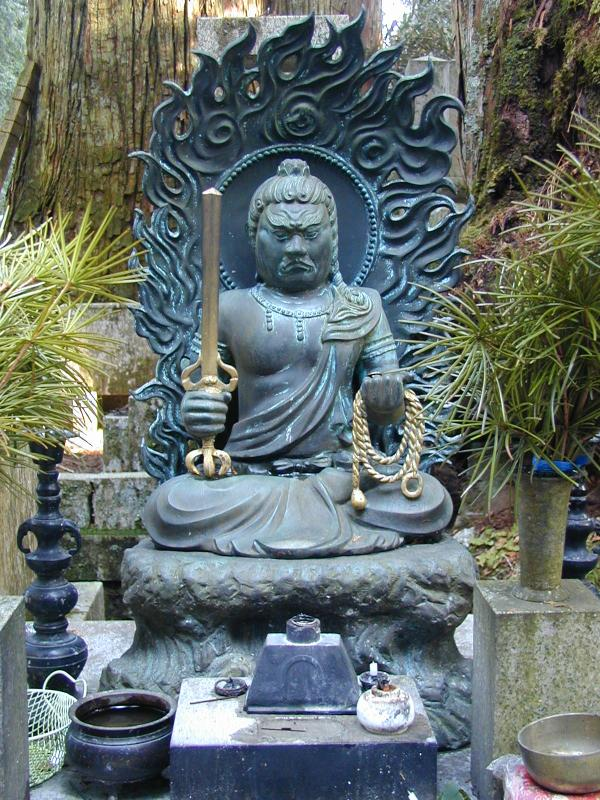
Statue of Fudō Myōō (Acala), guardian deity

Fudōshin (Japanese: 不動心) is a state of equanimity or imperturbability (literally and metaphorically, "immovable mind", "immovable heart" or "unmoving heart"). It is a philosophical or mental dimension to Japanese martial arts which contributes to the effectiveness of the advanced practitioner.

Fudō Myōō is found in Shingon Buddhism as a guardian deity (and patron of martial arts), who is portrayed as carrying a sword in his right hand (to cut through delusions and ignorance) and a rope in his left (to bind "evil forces" and violent or uncontrolled passions and emotions). Despite a fearsome appearance, his attributes of benevolence and servitude to living beings are symbolized by a hairstyle associated with the servant class.

== See also ==
- Martial arts
- Bushido
- Mushin mental state
- Zanshin
- Shoshin
- Religions of Japan
