= Zanshin =

State of awareness in Japanese martial arts

Zanshin (Japanese: 残心) is a state of awareness; of relaxed alertness, in Japanese martial arts. A literal translation of zanshin is "remaining mind".

In several martial arts, zanshin refers specifically to the body's posture after a technique is executed.

== In various martial arts ==
In kyūdō, zanshin means the body posture after the loosing of an arrow; the posture is intended to reflect the higher meaning of zanshin, which is a mental aspect maintained before, during, and after an action.

In karate, zanshin is the state of total awareness. It means being aware of one's surroundings and enemies, while being prepared to react.

In the context of kendō, zanshin is the continued state of spirit, mental alertness and physical readiness to meet the situation (such as an opposing attack) that must be maintained when one returns to kamae after attacking. It is one of the essential elements that define a good attack.

During the practice of aikidō, the usual method of practicing zanshin is to focus on the just-thrown uke, or opponent, while holding kamae and maintaining awareness in case there are additional attacks or attackers. In Iwama Style training, zanshin is practiced as general awareness of one's surroundings, of which uke is just a small part. In Yōseikan-style aikidō, students are trained to maintain that continued state of mental awareness and physical readiness beyond the dōjō walls and into daily life.

== See also ==
- Fudoshin
- Mushin (mental state)
- Shoshin
