= Metabaru Air Field =

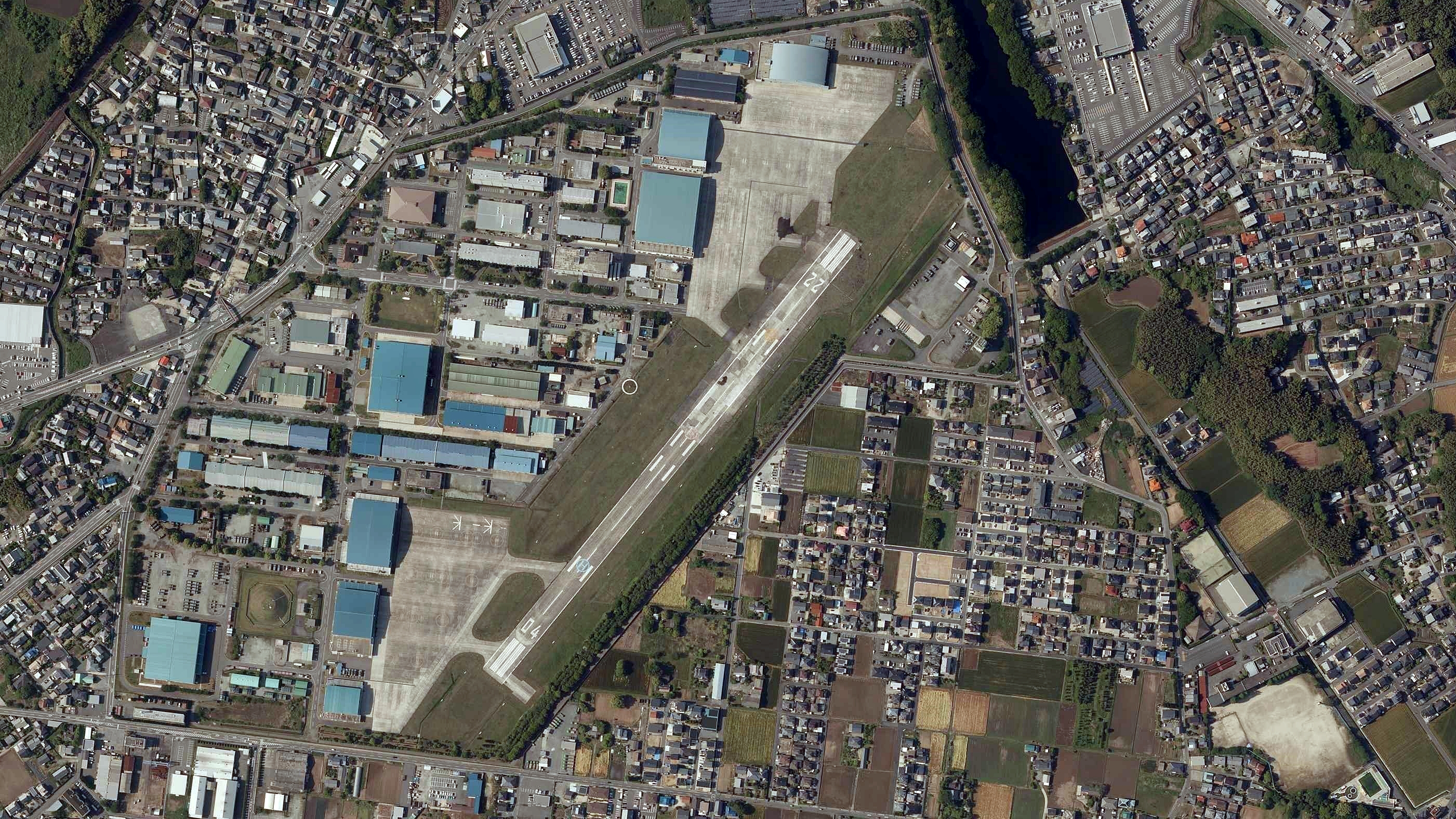
- IATA: none; ICAO: RJDM

Summary
- Airport type: Military
- Operator: Japan Ground Self-Defense Force
- Location: JGSDF Camp Metabaru, Japan
- Elevation AMSL: 53 ft / 16 m
- Coordinates: 33°19′31″N 130°24′49″E

Map
- Location in Japan

Runways
Direction	Length		Surface
Direction	m	ft	Surface
04/22	660	2,165	Paved
- Source: Japanese AIP at AIS Japan

Metabaru Air Field (目達原飛行場, Metabaru Hikōjō) (ICAO: RJDM) is a military aerodrome of the Japan Ground Self-Defense Force (JGSDF). It is located at JGSDF Camp Metabaru (目達原駐屯地, Metabaru Chūtonchi), in Yoshinogari, Saga Prefecture, Japan.

== History ==
Metabaru Air Field was opened in 1943 as a branch of the Imperial Japanese Army Air Service Tachiarai Training School with the specific task of training pilots for the Japanese Special Attack Units. In 1954, it became a supply depot for the Japan Ground Self-Defense Force, with the 4th Air Corps relocating from Ozuki Garrison in 1956.The 4th Air Corps became the 4th Squadron, a subordinate unit of the Western Air Corps in 1962. In 1968, the Western Helicopter Squadron was established. This was followed by the 3rd Anti-Tank Helicopter Squadron in 1990. The squadron was equipped with AH-64D Apache from 2010.

On February 5, 2018 an AH-64D Apache based at Metabaru crashed in nearby Kanzaki, Saga. Both crew members were killed in the crash, a local person was injured and a house was destroyed.
