= 721st Naval Air Group =

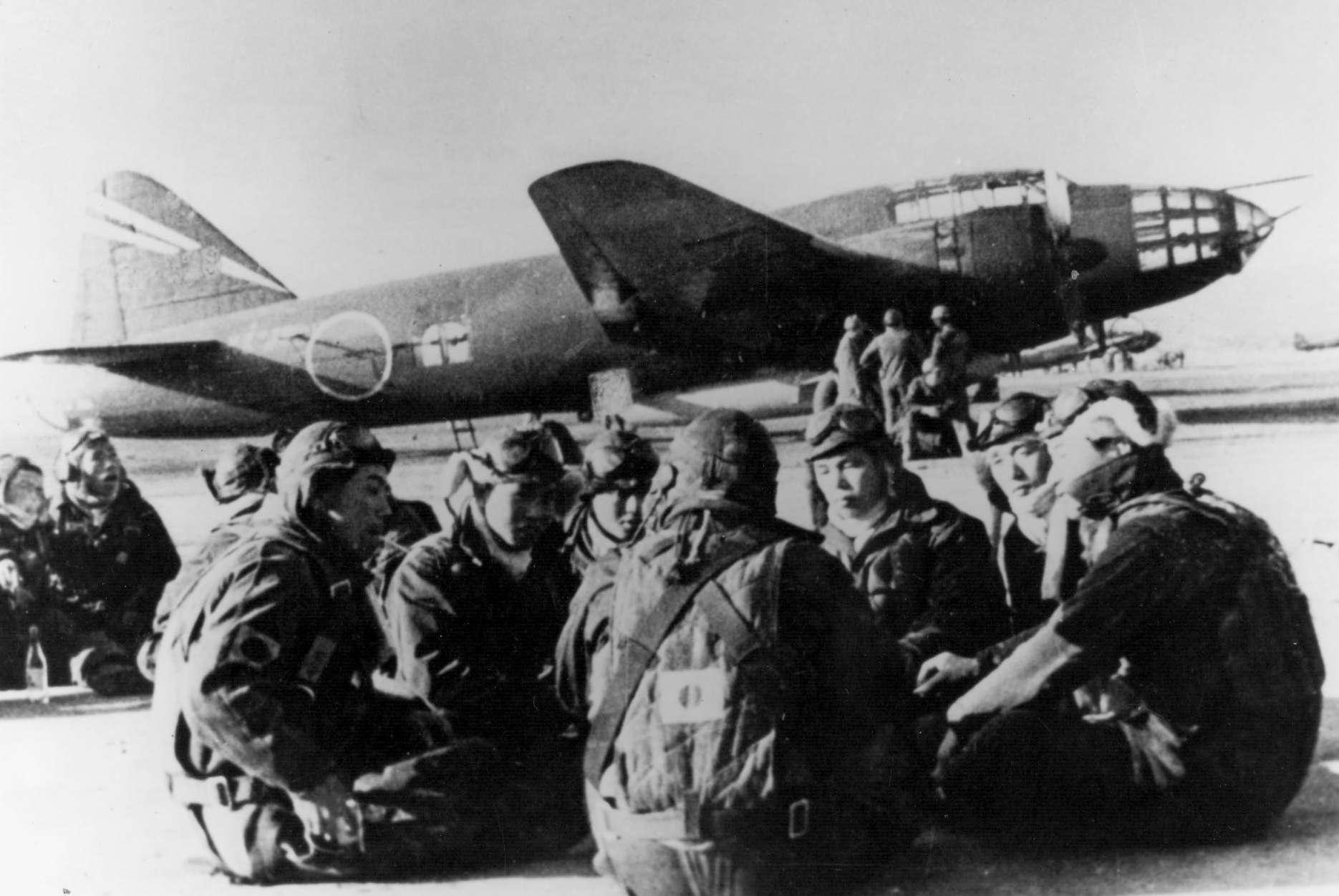
- Mitsubishi G4M2E 721-328 of the 711th Attack Squadron (Kōnoike Air Base, Japan, February 1945)
- Active: October 1, 1944–August 21, 1945
- Country: Empire of Japan
- Allegiance: Empire of Japan
- Branch: (Empire of Japan) Imperial Japanese Navy
- Type: Naval aviation unit
- Role: Bomber, manned bomb, fighter
- Size: 72 (1 October 1944)
- Part of: Yokosuka Naval District; Combined Fleet; 11th Air Flotilla; 5th Air Fleet
- Garrison/HQ: Hyakurigahara, Japan; Komatsu, Japan; Kōnoike, Japan; Kanoya, Japan; Tomitaka, Japan; Matsuyama, Japan; Kan'onji, Japan; Misawa, Japan; Chitose, Japan
- Nicknames: 神雷部隊 Jinrai Butai (God thunder Corps)
- Aircraft flown: G4M Type 1 "Betty"; MXY7 Ohka "Baka"; A6M Type 0 "Zeke"; D4Y Suisei "Judy"
- Engagements: World War II: Battle of Okinawa

Insignia
- Identification symbol: ヨF (YoF, October 1944); 721 (November 1944); 721 K (708th AS, 1945) 神 (Jin, fighter squadron, 1945)

The 721st Naval Air Group (第七二一海軍航空隊, Dai Nana-Futa-Hito Kaigun Kōkūtai) was an aircraft and airbase garrison unit of the Imperial Japanese Navy (IJN) during the Pacific campaign of World War II. This air group was organised for use in suicide attacks. It was otherwise known as the God Thunder Corps (神雷部隊, Jinrai Butai).

== Structure ==
- Higher unit
  - Yokosuka Naval District (1 October 1944–14 November 1944)
  - Combined Fleet (15 November 1944–19 December 1944)
  - 11th Air Flotilla (20 December 1944–9 February 1945)
  - 5th Air Fleet (10 February 1945–21 August 1945, dissolved.)
- Lower unit
  - Attack bomber Squadron (1 October 1944–14 November 1944)
    - Renamed 711th Attack Squadron on 15 November 1944.
  - Ohka Squadron (1 October 1944–21 August 1945)
  - Suisei Squadron (15 November 1944–14 February 1945)
    - Aircraft and airmen were moved to 722nd Naval Air Group on 15 February 1945.
  - 305th Fighter Squadron (1 February 1945–19 August 1945)
  - 306th Fighter Squadron (15 November 1944–19 August 1945)
  - 307th Fighter Squadron (1 February 1945–19 August 1945)
  - 708th Attack Squadron (20 December 1944–21 August 1945)
  - 711th Attack Squadron (15 November 1944–5 May 1945, dissolved.)
    - Aircraft and airmen were moved to the 708th Attack Squadron on 5 May 1945.
  - Kamikaze
    - Shinken Unit
    - Shichisei Unit
    - Tsukuba Unit
    - Shōwa Unit
- Commanding officer
  - Capt. Motoharu Okamura (50) - 1 October 1944 - 30 September 1945

== See also ==
- List of Imperial Japanese Navy air-to-surface special attack units
- Mitsubishi G4M
- Yokosuka MXY7 Ohka

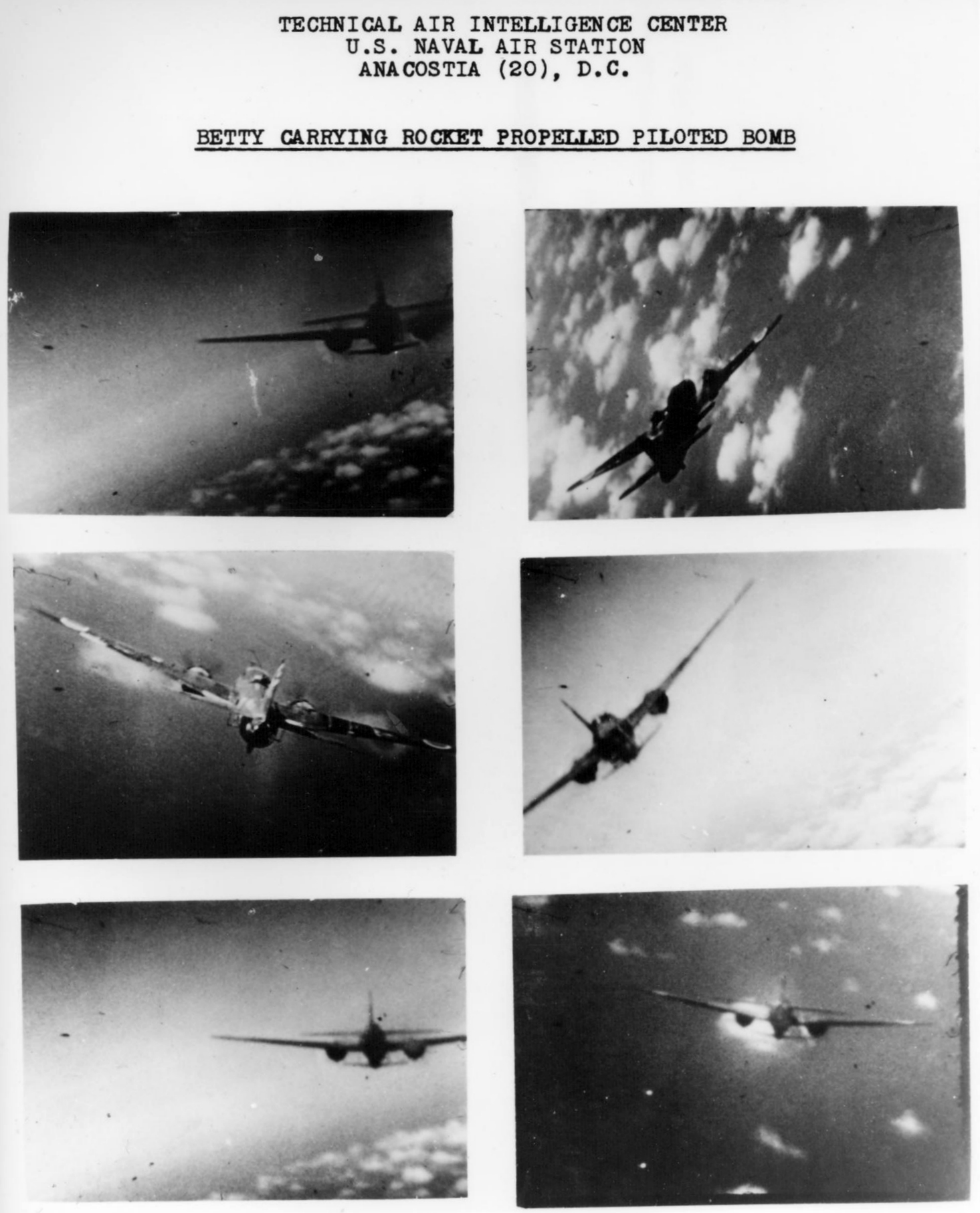
Mitsubishi G4M2E "Betty" of the 711th Attack Squadron/721st Naval Air Group under attack on 21 March 1945.

== Bibliography ==
- Atene Shobō, Tōkyō, Japan.
  - Navy battle record of special attack units, Author: each air unit of the Imperial Japanese Navy, reprinted in 2001, ISBN 4-87152-220-2.
- Bunrin-Dō Co., Ltd., Tōkyō, Japan.
  - Famous Airplanes of the World No. 59, Type 1 Attack Bomber, 1996, ISBN 4-89319-056-3.
  - Famous Airplanes of the World, Special Edition Vol. 6, Type Zero Carrier Fighter, 2012, ISBN 4-89319-208-6.
  - Koku-Fan Illustrated No. 42, Japanese Imperial Army & Navy Aircraft Color, Marking, 1988.
  - Koku-Fan Illustrated Special, Japanese Military Aircraft Illustrated Vol. 2, "Bombers", 1982.
- Gakken, Tōkyō, Japan.
  - Hiroshi Katō, How the Gods of Thunder unit turned out (Jinrai Butai shimatsuki), 2009, ISBN 978-4-05-404202-5.
- Model Art Co. Ltd., Tōkyō, Japan.
  - Model Art No. 406, Special issue Camouflage & Markings of Imperial Japanese Navy Bombers in W.W.II, 1993.
  - Model Art No. 458, Special issue Imperial Japanese Navy Air Force Suicide Attack Unit "Kamikaze", 1995.
  - Model Art No. 510, Special issue Camouflage & Markings of the I.J.N. Fighters, 1998.
  - Model Art No. 525, Special issue Shūsui and Jet aircraft / Rocket aircraft of the Imperial Japanese Army and Navy, 1998.
  - Model Art No. 847, Special issue Model Art Profile No. 12, "A6M of IJN (Part 1)", 2012.
  - Model Art No. 857, Special issue Model Art Profile No. 13, "A6M of IJN (Part 2)", 2012.
- Ushio Shobō, Tōkyō, Japan.
  - The Maru Special No. 108, Kamikaze Special Attack Forces, 1986.
  - The Maru Mechanic No. 46, Naval Aero-Technical Arsenal Bomber "Ginga" P1Y / Mitsubishi Type 1 Attack Bomber G4M (Betty), 1984.
