= List of Imperial Japanese Navy air-to-surface special attack units =

This article handles air-to-surface special attack units by Action Order only. Therefore, this article does not handle other suicide attack groups using Ko-hyoteki, Kaiten or Shinyo (suicide boat) and other voluntary special/suicide attack forces.

Air unit names in this article.
Japanese military unit names have various translations on en.Wikipedia. This article uses the following side-by-side translations to avoid confusion.

Japanese (Kanji)	Rōmaji	English (Use in this article)	Example
航空艦隊	Kōkū Kantai	Air Fleet	第一航空艦隊 (Dai 1 Kōkū Kantai) is 1st Air Fleet.
航空戦隊	Kōkū Sentai	Air Flotilla	第二十五航空戦隊 (Dai 25 Kōkū Sentai) is 25th Air Flotilla.
航空戦隊	Kōkū Sentai	Carrier Division	第一航空戦隊 (Dai 1 Kōkū Sentai) is 1st Carrier Division.
聯合航空隊	Rengō Kōkūtai	Combined Air Group (CAG)	第十一聯合航空隊 (Dai 11 Rengō Kōkūtai) is 11th Combined Air Group.
海軍航空隊	Kaigun Kōkūtai	Naval Air Group (NAG)	第二〇一海軍航空隊 (Dai Futa-Maru-Ichi Kaigun Kōkūtai) is 201st Naval Air Group.
航空隊	Kōkūtai	Air Group (AG)	第一二航空隊 (Dai 12 Kōkūtai) is 12th Air Group.
戦闘飛行隊	Sentō Hikōtai	Fighter Squadron (FS)	戦闘第三〇一飛行隊 (Sentō Dai 301 Hikōtai) is 301st Fighter Squadron.
攻撃飛行隊	Kōgeki Hikōtai	Attack Squadron (AS)	攻撃第一飛行隊 (Kōgeki Dai 1 Hikōtai) is 1st Attack Squadron.
偵察飛行隊	Teisatsu Hikōtai	Reconnaissance Squadron (RS)	偵察第一三一飛行隊 (Teisatsu Dai 131 Hikōtai) is 131st Reconnaissance Squadron.

== Kamikaze Special Attack Group ==
=== 1st Kamikaze Special Attack Group ===
- Shikishima Unit (第一神風特別攻撃隊 敷島隊,, Dai 1 Kamikaze Tokubetsu Kōgekitai, Shikishima-tai)
  - Original unit; 201st NAG (301st FS, 305th FS, 311th FS), 203rd NAG (303rd FS)
  - 21 October 1944
    - 3× A6M2b (attack), 3× A6M (escort); Search and attack U.S. carrier task force east off Philippines.
  - 23 October 1944
    - ?× A6M2b; Search and attack U.S. carrier task force east off Philippines, mission failed and all surviving aircraft returned to base.
  - 25 October 1944
    - 5× A6M2b (attack), 3× A6M (escort); U.S. carrier task force, TA 85°, 30 nmi from Tacloban.

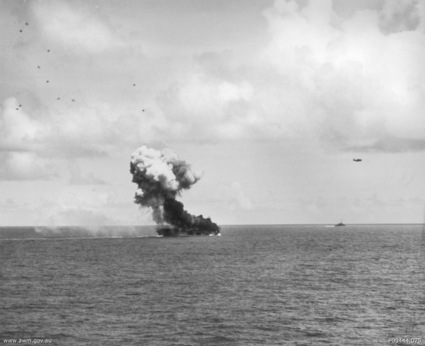
Yamato Unit hit to USS Suwannee, 26 October 1944.

- Yamato Unit (第一神風特別攻撃隊 大和隊,, Dai 1 Kamikaze Tokubetsu Kōgekitai, Yamato-tai)
  - Original unit; 201st NAG (301st FS, 305th FS, 306th FS, 311th FS)
  - 21 October 1944
    - 3× A6M (attack); U.S. carrier task force east off Leyte Gulf.
  - 23 October 1944
    - 2× A6M (attack); Search and attack U.S. carrier task force off Suluan Island.
  - 25 October 1944
    - 2× A6M (attack), 1× D4Y (guidance); U.S. carrier task force, TA 85°-90 nmi from Tacloban.
  - 26 October 1944
    - 5× A6M (attack), 3× A6M (escort); U.S. carrier task force, east of 80 nmi from Surigao.
  - 27 October 1944
    - 2× A6M (attack); U.S. carrier task force, TA 87°-20 nmi from Surigao.
- Asahi Unit (第一神風特別攻撃隊 朝日隊,, Dai 1 Kamikaze Tokubetsu Kōgekitai, Asahi-tai)
  - Original unit; 201st NAG (301st FS)
  - 21 October 1944
    - ?× A6M (attack); Search and attack off Philippines, mission failed and aircraft returned to base.
  - 25 October 1944
    - 2× A6M (attack), 1× A6M (escort); U.S. carrier task force, TA 28°-263 nmi from Leyte.
- Yamazakura Unit (第一神風特別攻撃隊 山櫻隊,, Dai 1 Kamikaze Tokubetsu Kōgekitai, Yamazakura-tai)
  - Original unit; 201st NAG (301st FS)
  - 22 October 1944
    - 2× A6M (attack), 2× A6M (escort); Search and attack east off Tacloban, mission failed and aircraft returned to base.
  - 25 October 1944
    - 2× A6M (attack), 2× A6M (escort); U.S. ship east off Mindanao.
- Kikusui Unit (第一神風特別攻撃隊 菊水隊,, Dai 1 Kamikaze Tokubetsu Kōgekitai, Kikusui-tai)
  - Original unit; 201st NAG (301st FS)
  - 25 October 1944
    - 3× A6M (attack), 1× A6M (escort); U.S. carrier task force, east of 40 nmi from Surigao Strait.
- Wakazakura Unit (第一神風特別攻撃隊 若櫻隊,, Dai 1 Kamikaze Tokubetsu Kōgekitai, Wakazakura-tai)
  - Original unit; 201st NAG (306th FS)
  - 25 October 1944
    - 4× A6M (attack), 2× A6M (escort); U.S. carrier task force, east of 90 nmi from Badubg.
- Hazakura Unit (第一神風特別攻撃隊 葉櫻隊,, Dai 1 Kamikaze Tokubetsu Kōgekitai, Hazakura-tai)
  - Original unit; 201st NAG (301st FS, 305th FS, 306th FS, 311th FS), 252nd NAG (317th FS)
  - 30 October 1944
    - 6× A6M (attack), 5× A6M (escort), U.S. carrier task force, TA 150°-40 nmi from Suluan Island.
- Hatsuzakura Unit (第一神風特別攻撃隊 初櫻隊,, Dai 1 Kamikaze Tokubetsu Kōgekitai, Hatsuzakura-tai)
  - Original unit; 201st NAG (311th FS)
  - 29 October 1944
    - 3× A6M (attack); U.S. carrier task force, TA 74°-180 nmi from Manila.
- Suisei Unit (第一神風特別攻撃隊 彗星隊,, Dai 1 Kamikaze Tokubetsu Kōgekitai, Suisei-tai)
  - Original unit; 761st NAG (105th AS)
  - 25 October 1944
    - 1× D4Y (attack); Search and attack in Leyte Gulf.

=== 2nd Kamikaze Special Attack Group ===
- Chūyū Unit (第二神風特別攻撃隊 忠勇隊,, Dai 2 Kamikaze Tokubetsu Kōgekitai, Chūyū-tai)
  - Original unit; 701st NAG (5th AS)
  - 27 October 1944
    - 3× D4Y3 (attack); Search and attack in Leyte Gulf.
  - 29 October 1944
    - 1× D4Y3 (attack); U.S. carrier task force, TA 80°-200 nmi from Manila.
- Giretsu Unit (第二神風特別攻撃隊 義烈隊,, Dai 2 Kamikaze Tokubetsu Kōgekitai, Giretsu-tai)
  - Original unit; 701st NAG (5th AS)
  - 27 October 1944
    - 2× D4Y3 (attack); Search and attack in Leyte Gulf.
  - 29 October 1944
    - 1× D4Y3 (attack); U.S. carrier task force, TA 80°-200 nmi from Manila.
- Junchū Unit (第二神風特別攻撃隊 純忠隊,, Dai 2 Kamikaze Tokubetsu Kōgekitai, Junchū-tai)
  - Original unit; 701st NAG (102nd AS)
  - 27 October 1944
    - 3× D3A2 (attack); U.S. ship in Leyte Gulf.
  - 28 October 1944
    - 1× D3A2 (attack); U.S. ship in Leyte Gulf
- Shisei Unit (第二神風特別攻撃隊 至誠隊,, Dai 2 Kamikaze Tokubetsu Kōgekitai, Shisei-tai)
  - Original unit; 701st NAG (102nd AS)
  - 29 October 1944
    - 1× D3A2 (attack); U.S. carrier task force, TA 80°-200 nmi from Manila.
    - 3× D3A2 (attack); U.S. carrier task force east off Manila.
  - 1 November 1944
    - 1× D3A2 (attack); U.S. ship off Tacloban.
- Seichū Unit (第二神風特別攻撃隊 誠忠隊,, Dai 2 Kamikaze Tokubetsu Kōgekitai, Seichū-tai)
  - Original unit; 701st NAG (103rd AS)
  - 27 October 1944
    - 3× D3A2 (attack); U.S. ship in Leyte Gulf.
- Jinmu Unit (第二神風特別攻撃隊 神武隊,, Dai 2 Kamikaze Tokubetsu Kōgekitai, Jinmu-tai)
  - Original unit; 701st NAG (103rd AS)
  - 29 October 1944
    - 3× D3A2 (attack); U.S. carrier task force, TA 80°-200 nmi from Manila.
  - 11 November 1944
    - 1× D3A2 (attack); U.S. convoy, south 20 nmi from Suluan Island.
- Shinpei Unit (第二神風特別攻撃隊 神兵隊,, Dai 2 Kamikaze Tokubetsu Kōgekitai, Shinpei-tai)
  - Original unit; 701st NAG (103rd AS)
  - 29 October 1944
    - 3× D3A2 (attack); U.S. carrier task force, TA 80°-200 nmi from Manila.
  - 1 November 1944
    - 1× D3A2 (attack); U.S. ship off Tacloban.
- Tenpei Unit (第二神風特別攻撃隊 天兵隊,, Dai 2 Kamikaze Tokubetsu Kōgekitai, Tenpei-tai)
  - Original unit; 701st NAG (102nd AS)
  - 1 November 1944
    - 3× D3A2 (attack); U.S. ship off Tacloban.
- Reisen Unit (第二神風特別攻撃隊 零戦隊,, Dai 2 Kamikaze Tokubetsu Kōgekitai, Reisen-tai)
  - Original unit; 221st NAG, 653rd NAG (166th FS)
  - 29 October 1944
    - 3× A6M (escort); Escorting Shisei Unit and Jinmu Unit, suicide attack after escorting.
  - 1 November 1944
    - 1× A6M (escort); Escorting Tenpei Unit, suicide attack after escorting.

=== 3rd Kamikaze Special Attack Group ===
- Baika Unit (第三神風特別攻撃隊 梅花隊,, Dai 3 Kamikaze Tokubetsu Kōgekitai, Baika-tai)
  - Original unit; 201st NAG (305th FS), 221st NAG (312th FS), 634th NAG (163rd FS)
  - 1 November 1944
    - 1× A6M (attack); U.S. ship in Leyte Gulf.
  - 12 November 1944
    - 3× A6M (attack), 1× A6M5a (escort); U.S. convoy off Tacloban.
- Sakon Unit (第三神風特別攻撃隊 左近隊,, Dai 3 Kamikaze Tokubetsu Kōgekitai, Sakon-tai)
  - Original unit; 203rd NAG (304th FS)
  - 5 November 1944
    - 2× A6M (attack); U.S. carrier task force, TA 90°-140 nmi from Cape Encanto.
- Ōka Unit (第三神風特別攻撃隊 櫻花隊,, Dai 3 Kamikaze Tokubetsu Kōgekitai, Ōka-tai)
  - Original unit; 201st NAG
  - 1 November 1944
    - 1× A6M (attack); U.S. convoy in Leyte Gulf.
- Ōka Unit No. 2 (第三神風特別攻撃隊 第二櫻花隊,, Dai 3 Kamikaze Tokubetsu Kōgekitai, Dai 2 Ōka-tai)
  - Original unit; 201st NAG, 203rd NAG (303rd FS)
  - 12 November 1944
    - 4× A6M (attack); U.S. convoy in Leyte Gulf.
- Byakko Unit (第三神風特別攻撃隊 白虎隊,, Dai 3 Kamikaze Tokubetsu Kōgekitai, Byakko-tai)
  - Original unit; 221st NAG (407th FS)
  - 5 November 1944
    - 2× A6M (attack); U.S. carrier task force, TA 70°-180 nmi from Cape Encanto.
- Byakko Unit No. 2 (第三神風特別攻撃隊 第二白虎隊,, Dai 3 Kamikaze Tokubetsu Kōgekitai, Dai 2 Byakko-tai)
  - Original unit; 201st NAG (311th FS), 203rd NAG (308th FS), 221st NAG (316th FS, 407th FS)
  - 12 November 1944
    - 6× A6M (attack), 1× A6M (escort); U.S. convoy in Leyte Gulf.
- Tokimune Unit (第三神風特別攻撃隊 時宗隊,, Dai 3 Kamikaze Tokubetsu Kōgekitai, Tokimune-tai)
  - Original unit; 201st NAG, 221st NAG (312th FS), 341st NAG (402nd FS)
  - 12 November 1944
    - 3× A6M (attack), 1× A6M (escort); U.S. convoy in Leyte Gulf.
- Seikō Unit (第三神風特別攻撃隊 正行隊,, Dai 3 Kamikaze Tokubetsu Kōgekitai, Seikō-tai)
  - Original unit; 201st NAG, 221st NAG (304th FS)
  - 13 November 1944
    - 3× A6M (attack), 1× A6M (escort); U.S. carrier task force, TA 60°-140 nmi from Manila.
- Yamamoto Unit (第三神風特別攻撃隊 山本隊,, Dai 3 Kamikaze Tokubetsu Kōgekitai, Yamamoto-tai)
  - Original unit; 221st NAG (308th FS, 313th FS)
  - 14 November 1944
    - 1× A6M (attack), 1× A6M (escort); U.S. carrier task force east off Lamon Bay.
- Shōmu Unit No. 5 (第三神風特別攻撃隊 第五聖武隊,, Dai 3 Kamikaze Tokubetsu Kōgekitai, Dai 5 Shōmu-tai)
  - Original unit; 201st NAG (305th FS, 306th FS, 311th FS)
  - 12 November 1944
    - 3× A6M (attack); U.S. convoy in Leyte Gulf.
- Shōmu Unit No. 8 (第三神風特別攻撃隊 第八聖武隊,, Dai 3 Kamikaze Tokubetsu Kōgekitai, Dai 8 Shōmu-tai)
  - Original unit; 201st NAG (305th FS, 306th FS)
  - 18 November 1944
    - 3× A6M (attack): U.S. convoy off Tacloban.
- Shōmu Unit No. 9 (第三神風特別攻撃隊 第九聖武隊,, Dai 3 Kamikaze Tokubetsu Kōgekitai, Dai 9 Shōmu-tai)
  - Original unit; 201st NAG (303rd FS, 306th FS)
  - 19 November 1944
    - 3× A6M (attack): U.S. convoy off Tacloban.
- Shōmu Unit No. 10 (第三神風特別攻撃隊 第十聖武隊,, Dai 3 Kamikaze Tokubetsu Kōgekitai, Dai 10 Shōmu-tai)
  - Original unit; 201st NAG (301st FS, 305th FS), 221st NAG (304th FS)
  - 26 November 1944
    - 2× A6M (attack), 2× A6M (escort); U.S. ship south off Tacloban Channel.
- Shōmu Unit No. 11 (第三神風特別攻撃隊 第十一聖武隊,, Dai 3 Kamikaze Tokubetsu Kōgekitai, Dai 11 Shōmu-tai)
  - Original unit; 201st NAG (316th FS)
  - 5 December 1944
    - 2× A6M (attack); U.S. convoy, TA 100°-170 nmi from Surigao.
- Suzaku Unit No. 2 (第三神風特別攻撃隊 第二朱雀隊,, Dai 3 Kamikaze Tokubetsu Kōgekitai, Dai 2 Suzaku-tai)
  - Original unit; 221st NAG (313th FS, 407th FS)
  - 9 November 1944
    - 1× A6M (attack), 1× A6M (escort); Search and attack U.S. carrier task force east off Lamon Bay.
- Kōtoku Unit (第三神風特別攻撃隊 高徳隊,, Dai 3 Kamikaze Tokubetsu Kōgekitai, Kōtoku-tai)
  - Original unit; 221st NAG (308th FS)
  - 19 November 1944
    - 1× A6M (escort); U.S. carrier task force east off Manila.
- Kōtoku Unit No. 3 (第三神風特別攻撃隊 第三高徳隊,, Dai 3 Kamikaze Tokubetsu Kōgekitai, Dai 3 Kōtoku-tai)
  - Original unit; 201st NAG (302nd FS, 316th FS)
  - 25 November 1944
    - 2× A6M (attack), 3× A6M (escort); U.S. carrier task force, TA 10°-100 nmi from Cape Naga.
- Kasagi Unit (第三神風特別攻撃隊 笠置隊,, Dai 3 Kamikaze Tokubetsu Kōgekitai, Kasagi-tai)
  - Original unit; 201st NAG (302nd FS), 221st NAG (304th FS, 315th FS)
  - 25 November 1944
    - 2× A6M (attack), 2× A6M (escort); U.S. carrier task force, TA 70°-150 nmi from Clark Field.
- Yoshino Unit (第三神風特別攻撃隊 吉野隊,, Dai 3 Kamikaze Tokubetsu Kōgekitai, Yoshino-tai)
  - Original unit; 201st NAG (302nd FS), 221st NAG (304th FS, 315th FS)
  - 25 November 1944
    - 6× A6M (attack), 2× A6M (escort); U.S. carrier task force, TA 75°-100 nmi from Clark Field.
- Ukon Unit (第三神風特別攻撃隊 右近隊,, Dai 3 Kamikaze Tokubetsu Kōgekitai, Ukon-tai)
  - Original unit; 221st NAG (304th FS)
  - 26 November 1944
    - 2× A6M (attack), 2× A6M (escort); U.S. ship south off Tacloban Channel.
- Kasuga Unit (第三神風特別攻撃隊 春日隊,, Dai 3 Kamikaze Tokubetsu Kōgekitai, Kasuga-tai)
  - Original unit; 201st NAG (303rd FS, 316th FS), 221st NAG (304th FS), 604th NAG (5th AS), 701st (3rd AS)
  - 27 November 1944
    - 1× A6M, 2× D4Y3 (attack), 3× A6M (escort); U.S. convoy in Leyte Gulf.
- Sakurai Unit No. 1 (第三神風特別攻撃隊 第一櫻井隊,, Dai 3 Kamikaze Tokubetsu Kōgekitai, Dai 1 Sakurai-tai)
  - Original unit; 201st NAG (302nd FS, 316th FS)
  - 6 December 1944
    - 1× A6M (attack), 1× A6M (escort); U.S. ship in Leyte Gulf.
- Sakurai Unit No. 5 (第三神風特別攻撃隊 第五櫻井隊,, Dai 3 Kamikaze Tokubetsu Kōgekitai, Dai 5 Sakurai-tai)
  - Original unit; 201st NAG (316th FS), 341st NAG (401st FS)
  - 7 December 1944
    - 4× A6M (attack), 1× N1K1-J (escort); U.S. convoy in Ormoc.
- Sakurai Unit No. 7 (第三神風特別攻撃隊 第七櫻井隊,, Dai 3 Kamikaze Tokubetsu Kōgekitai, Dai 7 Sakurai-tai)
  - Original unit; 201st NAG (305th FS, 316th FS), 341st NAG (401st FS)
  - 7 December 1944
    - 3× A6M (attack), 3× N1K1-J (escort); U.S. ship in Camotes Sea.
- Chihaya Unit (第三神風特別攻撃隊 千早隊,, Dai 3 Kamikaze Tokubetsu Kōgekitai, Chihaya-tai)
  - Original unit; 201st NAG (316th FS)
  - 7 December 1944
    - 4× A6M, 1× D4Y (attack); U.S. ship off Camotes Islands.

=== 4th Kamikaze Special Attack Group ===
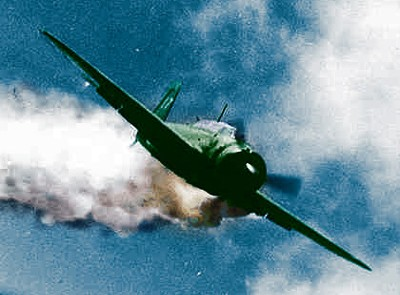
Yokosuka D4Y3 "Judy" 701-17 of Katori Unit, 25 November 1944.

- Kashima Unit (第四神風特別攻撃隊 鹿島隊,, Dai 4 Kamikaze Tokubetsu Kōgekitai, Kashima-tai)
  - Original unit; 701st NAG (102nd AS)
  - 6 November 1944
    - 3× D3A2 (attack); U.S. carrier task force east off Luzon.
  - 7 November 1944
    - 2× D3A2 (attack); Search and attack off Philippines, mission failed and aircraft returned to base.
  - 11 November 1944
    - 1× D3A2 (attack); U.S. convoy, south of 20 nmi from Suluan Island.
- Kanzaki Unit (第四神風特別攻撃隊 神崎隊,, Dai 4 Kamikaze Tokubetsu Kōgekitai, Kanzaki-tai)
  - Original unit; 701st NAG (103rd AS)
  - 3 November 1944
    - 3× D3A2 (attack); Search and attack off Philippines, mission failed and aircraft returned to base.
  - 11 November 1944
    - 3× D3A2 (attack); U.S. convoy, south of 20 nmi from Suluan Island.
- Minatogawa Unit (第四神風特別攻撃隊 湊川隊,, Dai 4 Kamikaze Tokubetsu Kōgekitai, Minatogawa-tai)
  - Original unit; 701st NAG (102nd AS)
  - 14 November 1944
    - 3× D4Y3 (attack); Mission was canceled, return to Japan homeland.
- Katori Unit (第四神風特別攻撃隊 香取隊,, Dai 4 Kamikaze Tokubetsu Kōgekitai, Katori-tai)
  - Original unit; 701st NAG (3rd AS)
  - 25 November 1944
    - 2× D4Y3 (attack); U.S. carrier task force, TA 75°-150 nmi from Clark Field.
- Reisen Unit (第四神風特別攻撃隊 零戦隊,, Dai 4 Kamikaze Tokubetsu Kōgekitai, Reisen-tai)
  - Original unit; 653rd NAG
  - 6 November 1944
    - 1× A6M (escort); Escorting Kashima Unit, suicide attack after escorting.

=== 5th Kamikaze Special Attack Group ===
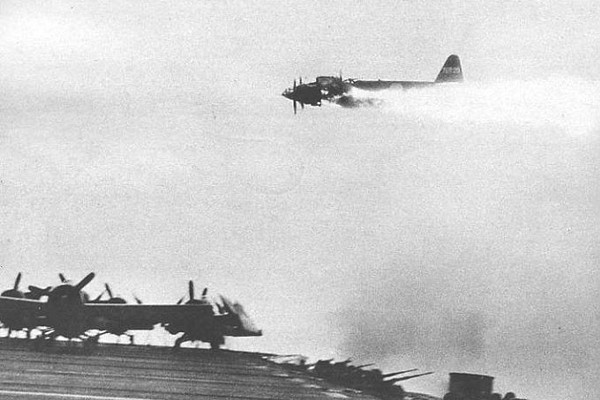
Yokosuka P1Y1 "Frances" 763-29 of Kusanagi Unit No. 1, 15 December 1944.

- Reppū Unit (第五神風特別攻撃隊 烈風隊,, Dai 5 Kamikaze Tokubetsu Kōgekitai, Reppū-tai)
  - Original unit; 763rd NAG
  - 14 November 1944
    - 2× P1Y1 (attack); U.S. carrier task force, east of 210 nmi from Manila, mission failed and aircraft returned to base.
- Shippū Unit (第五神風特別攻撃隊 疾風隊,, Dai 5 Kamikaze Tokubetsu Kōgekitai, Shippū-tai)
  - Original unit; 763rd NAG (501st AS), 341st NAG (402nd FS, 701st FS)
  - 25 November 1944
    - 4× P1Y1 (attack), 2× N1K1-J (escort); U.S. carrier task force east off Lamon Bay.
- Kyōfū Unit (第五神風特別攻撃隊 強風隊,, Dai 5 Kamikaze Tokubetsu Kōgekitai, Kyōfū-tai)
  - Original unit; 763rd NAG (405th AS)
  - 25 November 1944
    - 2× P1Y1 (attack); U.S. carrier task force east off Lamon Bay.
- Dotō Unit (第五神風特別攻撃隊 怒濤隊,, Dai 5 Kamikaze Tokubetsu Kōgekitai, Dotō-tai)
  - Original unit; 763rd NAG (405th AS)
  - 4 December 1944
    - 1× P1Y1 (attack); U.S. aircraft carrier in Kossol Roads.
- Gufū Unit (第五神風特別攻撃隊 颶風隊,, Dai 5 Kamikaze Tokubetsu Kōgekitai, Gufū-tai)
  - Original unit; 763rd NAG (405th AS)
  - 7 December 1944
    - 5× P1Y1 (attack); U.S. ship west off Leyte.
- Kusanagi Unit No. 1 (第五神風特別攻撃隊 第一草薙隊,, Dai 5 Kamikaze Tokubetsu Kōgekitai, Dai 1 Kusanagi-tai)
  - Original unit; 763rd NAG (405th AS)
  - 15 December 1944
    - 2× P1Y1 (attack); U.S. carrier task force in Sulu Sea.
- No name unit
  - Original unit; 763rd NAG (405th AS)
  - 21 November 1944
    - 3× P1Y1 (attack); U.S. carrier task force, northeast of 230 nmi from Davao.

=== Kamikaze Special Attack Group "Kongō Unit" ===
- Kongō Unit No. 1 (神風特別攻撃隊 第一金剛隊,, Kamikaze Tokubetsu Kōgekitai, Dai 1 Kongō-tai)
  - Original unit; 201st NAG (302nd FS)
  - 11 December 1944
    - 4× A6M (attack), 2× A6M (escort); U.S. ship near Surigao Straits.
- Kongō Unit No. 2 (神風特別攻撃隊 第二金剛隊,, Kamikaze Tokubetsu Kōgekitai, Dai 2 Kongō-tai)
  - Original unit; 201st NAG (302nd FS, 316th FS)
  - 13 December 1944
    - 4× A6M (attack), 1× A6M (escort); U.S. ship in Murcielagos Bay.
- Kongō Unit No. 3 (神風特別攻撃隊 第三金剛隊,, Kamikaze Tokubetsu Kōgekitai, Dai 3 Kongō-tai)
  - Original unit; 201st NAG (302nd FS)
  - 14 December 1944
    - 3× A6M (attack), 2× A6M (escort); U.S. convoy, TA 240°-80 nmi from Bacolod.
- Kongō Unit No. 5 (神風特別攻撃隊 第五金剛隊,, Kamikaze Tokubetsu Kōgekitai, Dai 5 Kongō-tai)
  - Original unit; 201st NAG (316th FS)
  - 14 December 1944
    - 2× A6M (attack), 1× A6M (escort); U.S. invasion force off Negros Island.
- Kongō Unit No. 6 (神風特別攻撃隊 第六金剛隊,, Kamikaze Tokubetsu Kōgekitai, Dai 6 Kongō-tai)
  - Original unit; 201st NAG
  - 14 December 1944
    - 6× A6M (attack), 3× D4Y (attack); U.S. convoy south off Dumagueted.
- Kongō Unit No. 7 (神風特別攻撃隊 第七金剛隊,, Kamikaze Tokubetsu Kōgekitai, Dai 7 Kongō-tai)
  - Original unit; 201st NAG (302nd FS, 316th FS)
  - 15 December 1944
    - 6× A6M (attack), 4× A6M (escort); U.S. ship TA 90°, 45 nmi from Nano.
- Kongō Unit No. 9 (神風特別攻撃隊 第九金剛隊,, Kamikaze Tokubetsu Kōgekitai, Dai 9 Kongō-tai)
  - Original unit; 201st NAG (316th FS)
  - 15 December 1944
    - 12× A6M, 1× D4Y (attack); U.S. invasion force off Mindoro.
- Kongō Unit No. 10 (神風特別攻撃隊 第十金剛隊,, Kamikaze Tokubetsu Kōgekitai, Dai 10 Kongō-tai)
  - Original unit; 201st NAG (316th FS)
  - 15 December 1944
    - 2× A6M (attack); U.S. ship in Murcielagos Bay.
- Kongō Unit No. 11 (神風特別攻撃隊 第十一金剛隊,, Kamikaze Tokubetsu Kōgekitai, Dai 11 Kongō-tai)
  - Original unit; 201st NAG (316th FS)
  - 16 December 1944
    - 11× A6M, 1× D4Y (attack); U.S. invasion force off San Jose.
- Kongō Unit No. 12 (神風特別攻撃隊 第十二金剛隊,, Kamikaze Tokubetsu Kōgekitai, Dai 12 Kongō-tai)
  - Original unit; 201st NAG
  - 16 December 1944
    - 2× A6M (attack), 4× A6M (escort); U.S. carrier task force in northern Sulu Sea, mission failed and aircraft returned to base.
- Kongō Unit No. 13 (神風特別攻撃隊 第十三金剛隊,, Kamikaze Tokubetsu Kōgekitai, Dai 13 Kongō-tai)
  - Original unit; 201st NAG
  - 24 December 1944
    - 8× A6M (attack), 8× A6M (escort); U.S. carrier task force TA 78°, 138 nmi from Manila, mission failed and aircraft returned to base.
- Kongō Unit No. 14 (神風特別攻撃隊 第十四金剛隊,, Kamikaze Tokubetsu Kōgekitai, Dai 14 Kongō-tai)
  - Original unit; 201st NAG (316th FS)
  - 28 December 1944
    - 3× A6M (attack); U.S. convoy east off Siquijor.
- Kongō Unit No. 15 (神風特別攻撃隊 第十五金剛隊,, Kamikaze Tokubetsu Kōgekitai, Dai 15 Kongō-tai)
  - Original unit; 201st NAG (316th FS)
  - 29 December 1944
    - 4× A6M (attack); U.S. convoy south south off Mindoro.
- Kongō Unit No. 16 (神風特別攻撃隊 第十六金剛隊,, Kamikaze Tokubetsu Kōgekitai, Dai 16 Kongō-tai)
  - Original unit; 201st NAG
  - 31 December 1944
    - 8× A6M (attack), 6× A6M (escort), 2× D4Y (guidance); U.S. carrier task force TA 88°, 200 nmi from Manila, mission failed and aircraft returned to base.
- Kongō Unit No. 17 (神風特別攻撃隊 第十七金剛隊,, Kamikaze Tokubetsu Kōgekitai, Dai 17 Kongō-tai)
  - Original unit; 201st NAG
  - 31 December 1944
    - 4× A6M (attack), 3× A6M (escort), 1× D4Y (guidance); U.S. carrier task force TA 88°, 200 nmi from Manila, mission failed and aircraft returned to base.
- Kongō Unit No. 18 (神風特別攻撃隊 第十八金剛隊,, Kamikaze Tokubetsu Kōgekitai, Dai 18 Kongō-tai)
  - Original unit; 201st NAG (302nd FS, 316th FS)
  - 5 January 1945
    - 16× A6M (attack), 4× A6M (escort); U.S. invasion force west off Lubang Island.
- Kongō Unit No. 19 (神風特別攻撃隊 第十九金剛隊,, Kamikaze Tokubetsu Kōgekitai, Dai 19 Kongō-tai)
  - Original unit; 201st NAG
  - 6 January 1945
    - 15× A6M (attack), 2× A6M (escort); U.S. invasion force in Lingayen Gulf.
- Kongō Unit No. 20 (神風特別攻撃隊 第二十金剛隊,, Kamikaze Tokubetsu Kōgekitai, Dai 20 Kongō-tai)
  - Original unit; 201st NAG (316th FS)
  - 6 January 1945
    - 5× A6M (attack), 1× D4Y (result confirm); U.S. invasion force in Lingayen Gulf.
- Kongō Unit No. 22 (神風特別攻撃隊 第二十二金剛隊,, Kamikaze Tokubetsu Kōgekitai, Dai 22 Kongō-tai)
  - Original unit; 201st NAG (316th FS)
  - 6 January 1945
    - 4× A6M (attack); U.S. convoy in Lingayen Gulf.
- Kongō Unit No. 23 (神風特別攻撃隊 第二十三金剛隊,, Kamikaze Tokubetsu Kōgekitai, Dai 23 Kongō-tai)
  - Original unit; 201st NAG (316th FS)
  - 6 January 1945
    - 8× A6M (attack), 4× A6M (escort), 1× D4Y (guidance); U.S. invasion force off Iba.
- Kongō Unit No. 24 (神風特別攻撃隊 第二十四金剛隊,, Kamikaze Tokubetsu Kōgekitai, Dai 24 Kongō-tai)
  - Original unit; 201st NAG (316th FS)
  - 9 January 1945
    - 1× A6M (attack); U.S. convoy in Lingayen Gulf.
- Kongō Unit No. 25 (神風特別攻撃隊 第二十五金剛隊,, Kamikaze Tokubetsu Kōgekitai, Dai 25 Kongō-tai)
  - Original unit; 201st NAG (316th FS)
  - 9 January 1945
    - 2× A6M (attack); U.S. ship in Lingayen Gulf.
- Kongō Unit No. 26 (神風特別攻撃隊 第二十六金剛隊,, Kamikaze Tokubetsu Kōgekitai, Dai 26 Kongō-tai)
  - Original unit; 201st NAG (316th FS), 221st NAG (407th FS)
  - 9 January 1945
    - 2× A6M (attack), 1× A6M (escort); U.S. ship in Lingayen Gulf.
- Kongō Unit No. 27 (神風特別攻撃隊 第二十七金剛隊,, Kamikaze Tokubetsu Kōgekitai, Dai 27 Kongō-tai)
  - Original unit; 201st NAG
  - 25 January 1945
    - 4× A6M (attack); U.S. ship in Lingayen Gulf.
- Kongō Unit No. 28 (神風特別攻撃隊 第二十八金剛隊,, Kamikaze Tokubetsu Kōgekitai, Dai 28 Kongō-tai)
  - Original unit; 201st NAG (316th FS)
  - 7 January 1945
    - 3× A6M (attack), 2× A6M (escort); U.S. convoy in Lingayen Gulf.
- Kongō Unit No. 29 (神風特別攻撃隊 第二十九金剛隊,, Kamikaze Tokubetsu Kōgekitai, Dai 29 Kongō-tai)
  - Original unit; 201st NAG (302nd FS, 316th FS)
  - 7 January 1945
    - 2× A6M (attack), 1× A6M (escort); U.S. convoy in Lingayen Gulf.
- Kongō Unit No. 30 (神風特別攻撃隊 第三十金剛隊,, Kamikaze Tokubetsu Kōgekitai, Dai 30 Kongō-tai)
  - Original unit; 201st NAG
  - 3 January 1945
    - 2× A6M (attack); U.S. convoy in Bohol Sea.
  - 6 January 1945
    - 2× A6M (attack); U.S. ship in Lingayen Gulf.
    - 1× A6M (attack); U.S. ship in Leyte Gulf.

=== Kamikaze Special Attack Group "Niitaka Unit" ===
- Niitaka Unit No. 1 (神風特別攻撃隊 第一新高隊,, Kamikaze Tokubetsu Kōgekitai, Dai 1 Niitaka-tai)
  - Original unit; 221st NAG (317th FS)
  - 15 January 1945
    - 1× A6M (attack); U.S. carrier task force, TA 195°-150 nmi from Magong.
- Niitaka Unit No. 2 (神風特別攻撃隊 第二新高隊,, Kamikaze Tokubetsu Kōgekitai, Dai 2 Niitaka-tai)
  - Original unit; 765th NAG (102nd AS)
  - 21 January 1945
    - 5× D4Y3 (attack); U.S. carrier task force, TA 115°-60 nmi from Taitung.
- Niitaka Unit No. 3 (神風特別攻撃隊 第三新高隊,, Kamikaze Tokubetsu Kōgekitai, Dai 3 Niitaka-tai)
  - Original unit; 221st NAG (316th FS, 317th FS)
  - 21 January 1945
    - 3× A6M (attack), 1× A6M (escort); U.S. carrier task force east off Taiwan.

=== Kamikaze Special Attack Group "Taigi Unit" ===
- Taigi Unit No. 1 (神風特別攻撃隊 第一大義隊,, Kamikaze Tokubetsu Kōgekitai, Dai 1 Taigi-tai)
  - Original unit; 205th NAG (317th FS)
  - 1 April 1945
    - 3× A6M (attack), 1× A6M (escort); Allies carrier task force south off Miyako-jima.
- Taigi Unit No. 2 (神風特別攻撃隊 第二大義隊,, Kamikaze Tokubetsu Kōgekitai, Dai 2 Taigi-tai)
  - Original unit; 205th NAG (317th FS)
  - 2 April 1945
    - 1× A6M (attack);; Allies carrier task force off Okinawa.
- Taigi Unit No. 3 (神風特別攻撃隊 第三大義隊,, Kamikaze Tokubetsu Kōgekitai, Dai 3 Taigi-tai)
  - Original unit; 205th NAG
  - 3 April 1945
    - 1× A6M (escort);; Escorting Chūsei Unit, suicide attack after escorting.
    - 2× A6M (escort);; Escorting Ginga Unit No. 3, suicide attack after escorting.
- Taigi Unit No. 4 (神風特別攻撃隊 第四大義隊,, Kamikaze Tokubetsu Kōgekitai, Dai 4 Taigi-tai)
  - Original unit; 205th NAG
  - 4 April 1945
    - 1× A6M (attack);; Allies carrier task force south off Okinawa.
- Taigi Unit No. 5 (神風特別攻撃隊 第五大義隊,, Kamikaze Tokubetsu Kōgekitai, Dai 5 Taigi-tai)
  - Original unit; 205th NAG
  - 5 April 1945
    - 1× A6M (attack), 1× A6M (escort); Allies carrier task force south off Miyako-jima.
- Taigi Unit No. 9 (神風特別攻撃隊 第九大義隊,, Kamikaze Tokubetsu Kōgekitai, Dai 9 Taigi-tai)
  - Original unit; 205th NAG
  - 13 April 1945
    - 1× A6M (attack), 1× A6M (escort); Allies carrier task force south off Yonaguni.
- Taigi Unit No. 10 (神風特別攻撃隊 第十大義隊,, Kamikaze Tokubetsu Kōgekitai, Dai 10 Taigi-tai)
  - Original unit; 205th NAG
  - 14 April 1945
    - 1× A6M (attack), 1× A6M (escort); Allies ship off Okinawa.
- Taigi Unit No. 12 (神風特別攻撃隊 第十二大義隊,, Kamikaze Tokubetsu Kōgekitai, Dai 12 Taigi-tai)
  - Original unit; 205th NAG
  - 17 April 1945
    - 2× A6M (attack); Allies carrier task force east off Taiwan.
- Taigi Unit No. 15 (神風特別攻撃隊 第十五大義隊,, Kamikaze Tokubetsu Kōgekitai, Dai 15 Taigi-tai)
  - Original unit; 205th NAG
  - 28 April 1945
    - 1× A6M (attack); Allies carrier task force south off Miyako-jima.
- Taigi Unit No. 16 (神風特別攻撃隊 第十六大義隊,, Kamikaze Tokubetsu Kōgekitai, Dai 16 Taigi-tai)
  - Original unit; 205th NAG (302nd FS)
  - 28 April 1945
    - 1× A6M (attack); Allies carrier task force south off Miyako-jima.
- Taigi Unit No. 17 (神風特別攻撃隊 第十七大義隊,, Kamikaze Tokubetsu Kōgekitai, Dai 17 Taigi-tai)
  - Original unit; 205th NAG (315th FS, 317th FS)
  - 4 May 1945
    - 6× A6M (attack), 2× A6M (escort); Allies carrier task force south off Miyako-jima.
- Taigi Unit No. 18 (神風特別攻撃隊 第十八大義隊,, Kamikaze Tokubetsu Kōgekitai, Dai 18 Taigi-tai)
  - Original unit; 205th NAG (302nd FS)
  - 9 May 1945
    - 4× A6M (attack), 1× A6M (escort); Allies carrier task force south off Miyako-jima.
- Taigi Unit No. 21 (神風特別攻撃隊 第二十一大義隊,, Kamikaze Tokubetsu Kōgekitai, Dai 21 Taigi-tai)
  - Original unit; 205th NAG (302nd FS)
  - 7 June 1945
    - 2× A6M (attack); Allies carrier task force east off Miyako-jima.

=== Kamikaze Special Attack Group "Tsukuba Unit" ===
- Tsukuba Unit No. 1 (神風特別攻撃隊 第一筑波隊,, Kamikaze Tokubetsu Kōgekitai, Dai 1 Tsukuba-tai)
  - Original unit; Tsukuba NAG
  - 6 April 1945
    - 17× A6M2 (attack); Allies convoy off Okinawa.
- Tsukuba Unit No. 2 (神風特別攻撃隊 第二筑波隊,, Kamikaze Tokubetsu Kōgekitai, Dai 2 Tsukuba-tai)
  - Original unit; Tsukuba NAG
  - 14 April 1945
    - 3× A6M2 (attack); Allies carrier task force off Tokunoshima.
- Tsukuba Unit No. 3 (神風特別攻撃隊 第三筑波隊,, Kamikaze Tokubetsu Kōgekitai, Dai 3 Tsukuba-tai)
  - Original unit; Tsukuba NAG
  - 16 April 1945
    - 7× A6M2 (attack); Allies carrier task force, southeast of 50 nmi and south of 100 nmi from Tokunoshima.
- Tsukuba Unit No. 4 (神風特別攻撃隊 第四筑波隊,, Kamikaze Tokubetsu Kōgekitai, Dai 4 Tsukuba-tai)
  - Original unit; Tsukuba NAG
  - 29 April 1945
    - 5× A6M2 (attack); Allies carrier task force, TA 120°-60 nmi and TA 90°-70 nmi from Okinawa Island.
- Tsukuba Unit No. 5 (神風特別攻撃隊 第五筑波隊,, Kamikaze Tokubetsu Kōgekitai, Dai 5 Tsukuba-tai)
  - Original unit; 721st NAG (306th FS)
  - 11 May 1945
    - 9× A6M5 (attack); Search and attack Allies carrier task force off Okinawa.
- Tsukuba Unit No. 6 (神風特別攻撃隊 第六筑波隊,, Kamikaze Tokubetsu Kōgekitai, Dai 6 Tsukuba-tai)
  - Original unit; 721st NAG (306th FS)
  - 14 May 1945
    - 14× A6M5 (attack); Search and attack Allies carrier task force east off Tanegashima.

=== Kamikaze Special Attack Group "Shichisei Unit" ===
- Shichisei Unit No. 1 (神風特別攻撃隊 第一七生隊,, Kamikaze Tokubetsu Kōgekitai, Dai 1 Shichisei-tai)
  - Original unit; Genzan NAG
  - 6 April 1945
    - 12× A6M2 (attack); Allies convoy off Okinawa.
- Shichisei Unit No. 2 (神風特別攻撃隊 第二七生隊,, Kamikaze Tokubetsu Kōgekitai, Dai 2 Shichisei-tai)
  - Original unit; Genzan NAG
  - 12 April 1945
    - 17× A6M2 (attack); Allies carrier task force east off Yoronjima.
- Shichisei Unit No. 3 (神風特別攻撃隊 第三七生隊,, Kamikaze Tokubetsu Kōgekitai, Dai 3 Shichisei-tai)
  - Original unit; Genzan NAG
  - 16 April 1945
    - 3× A6M2 (attack); Allies ship off Naha.
- Shichisei Unit No. 4 (神風特別攻撃隊 第四七生隊,, Kamikaze Tokubetsu Kōgekitai, Dai 4 Shichisei-tai)
  - Original unit; Genzan NAG
  - 16 April 1945
    - 9× A6M2 (attack); Allies carrier task force, southeast of 50 nmi and south of 50 nmi from Kikai Island.
- Shichisei Unit No. 5 (神風特別攻撃隊 第五七生隊,, Kamikaze Tokubetsu Kōgekitai, Dai 5 Shichisei-tai)
  - Original unit; Genzan NAG
  - 29 April 1945
    - 4× A6M2 (attack); Allies carrier task force, TA 120°-60 nmi and TA 90°-70 nmi from northern Okinawa Island.
- Shichisei Unit No. 6 (神風特別攻撃隊 第六七生隊,, Kamikaze Tokubetsu Kōgekitai, Dai 6 Shichisei-tai)
  - Original unit; 721st NAG (306th FS)
  - 11 May 1945
    - 3× A6M5 (attack); Mission failed and aircraft returned to base.
- Shichisei Unit No. 7 (神風特別攻撃隊 第七七生隊,, Kamikaze Tokubetsu Kōgekitai, Dai 7 Shichisei-tai)
  - Original unit; 721st NAG (306th FS)
  - 11 May 1945
    - 1× A6M5 (attack); Search and attack U.S. carrier task force off Okinawa.
- Shichisei Unit No. 8 (神風特別攻撃隊 第八七生隊,, Kamikaze Tokubetsu Kōgekitai, Dai 8 Shichisei-tai)
  - Original unit; 721st NAG (306th FS)
  - 14 May 1945
    - 3× A6M5 (attack); Search and attack Allies carrier task force east off Tanegashima.

=== Kamikaze Special Attack Group "Shinken Unit" ===
- Shinken Unit No. 1 (神風特別攻撃隊 第一神剣隊,, Kamikaze Tokubetsu Kōgekitai, Dai 1 Shinken-tai)
  - Original unit; Ōmura NAG
  - 6 April 1945
    - 16× A6M2 (attack); Allies convoy off Okinawa.
- Shinken Unit No. 2 (神風特別攻撃隊 第二神剣隊,, Kamikaze Tokubetsu Kōgekitai, Dai 2 Shinken-tai)
  - Original unit; Ōmura NAG
  - 14 April 1945
    - 9× A6M2 (attack); Allies carrier task force off Kerama Islands.
- Shinken Unit No. 3 (神風特別攻撃隊 第三神剣隊,, Kamikaze Tokubetsu Kōgekitai, Dai 3 Shinken-tai)
  - Original unit; Ōmura NAG
  - 16 April 1945
    - 3× A6M2 (attack); Allies ship off Naha.
- Shinken Unit No. 4 (神風特別攻撃隊 第四神剣隊,, Kamikaze Tokubetsu Kōgekitai, Dai 4 Shinken-tai)
  - Original unit; Ōmura NAG
  - 16 April 1945
    - 1× A6M2 (attack); Allies carrier task force, southeast of 55 nmi and south of 50 nmi from Kikai Island.
- Shinken Unit No. 5 (神風特別攻撃隊 第五神剣隊,, Kamikaze Tokubetsu Kōgekitai, Dai 5 Shinken-tai)
  - Original unit; Ōmura NAG
  - 4 May 1945
    - 14× A6M2-K (attack); Allies picket vessels off Okinawa Island.
- Shinken Unit No. 6 (神風特別攻撃隊 第六神剣隊,, Kamikaze Tokubetsu Kōgekitai, Dai 6 Shinken-tai)
  - Original unit; 721st NAG (306th FS)
  - 11 May 1945
    - 4× A6M5 (attack); Allies ship off Okinawa Island.

=== Kamikaze Special Attack Group "Shōwa Unit" ===
- Shōwa Unit No. 1 (神風特別攻撃隊 第一昭和隊,, Kamikaze Tokubetsu Kōgekitai, Dai 1 Shōwa-tai)
  - Original unit; Yatabe NAG
  - 14 April 1945
    - 10× A6M2 (attack); Allies carrier task force east off Tokunoshima.
- Shōwa Unit No. 2 (神風特別攻撃隊 第二昭和隊,, Kamikaze Tokubetsu Kōgekitai, Dai 2 Shōwa-tai)
  - Original unit; Yatabe NAG
  - 16 April 1945
    - 4× A6M2 (attack); Allies ship off Naha.
- Shōwa Unit No. 3 (神風特別攻撃隊 第三昭和隊,, Kamikaze Tokubetsu Kōgekitai, Dai 3 Shōwa-tai)
  - Original unit; Yatabe NAG
  - 16 April 1945
    - 4× A6M2 (attack); Allies carrier task force, southeast of 55 nmi and south of 50 nmi from Kikai Island.
- Shōwa Unit No. 4 (神風特別攻撃隊 第四昭和隊,, Kamikaze Tokubetsu Kōgekitai, Dai 4 Shōwa-tai)
  - Original unit; Yatabe NAG
  - 16 April 1945
    - 2× A6M2 (attack); Allies carrier task force, southeast of 50 nmi and south of 100 nmi from Kikai Island.
- Shōwa Unit No. 5 (神風特別攻撃隊 第五昭和隊,, Kamikaze Tokubetsu Kōgekitai, Dai 5 Shōwa-tai)
  - Original unit; Yatabe NAG
  - 29 April 1945
    - 7× A6M2-K (attack); Allies carrier task force, TA 120°-60 nmi and TA 90°-70 nmi from northern Okinawa Island.
- Shōwa Unit No. 6 (神風特別攻撃隊 第六昭和隊,, Kamikaze Tokubetsu Kōgekitai, Dai 6 Shōwa-tai)
  - Original unit; 721st NAG (306th FS)
  - 11 May 1945
    - 2× A6M5 (attack); Allies ship off Okinawa Island.
- Shōwa Unit No. 7 (神風特別攻撃隊 第七昭和隊,, Kamikaze Tokubetsu Kōgekitai, Dai 7 Shōwa-tai)
  - Original unit; 721st NAG (306th FS)
  - 11 May 1945
    - 6× A6M5 (attack); Search and attack Allies carrier task force off Okinawa Island.

=== Kamikaze Special Attack Group "Hachiman Unit" ===
- Hachiman-Gokō Unit No. 1 (神風特別攻撃隊 第一八幡護皇隊,, Kamikaze Tokubetsu Kōgekitai, Dai 1 Hachiman-Gokō-tai)
  - Original unit; Usa NAG
  - 6 April 1945
    - 14× B5N, 15× D3A2 (attack); Allies ship off Okinawa Island.
- Hachiman-Gokō Unit No. 2 (神風特別攻撃隊 第二八幡護皇隊,, Kamikaze Tokubetsu Kōgekitai, Dai 2 Hachiman-Gokō-tai)
  - Original unit; Usa NAG
  - 12 April 1945
    - 10× B5N, 16× D3A2 (attack); Allies ship off Okinawa Island.
- Hachiman-Gokō Unit No. 3 (神風特別攻撃隊 第三八幡護皇隊,, Kamikaze Tokubetsu Kōgekitai, Dai 3 Hachiman-Gokō-tai)
  - Original unit; Usa NAG
  - 16 April 1945
    - 2× B5N, 18× D3A2 (attack); Allies ship off Kadena.
- Hachiman-Gokō Unit No. 4 (神風特別攻撃隊 第四八幡護皇隊,, Kamikaze Tokubetsu Kōgekitai, Dai 4 Hachiman-Gokō-tai)
  - Original unit; Usa NAG
    - No sorties.
- Hachiman-Gokō Unit No. 5 (神風特別攻撃隊 第五八幡護皇隊,, Kamikaze Tokubetsu Kōgekitai, Dai 5 Hachiman-Gokō-tai)
  - Original unit; Usa NAG
    - No sorties.
- Hachiman-Gokō Unit No. 6 (神風特別攻撃隊 第六八幡護皇隊,, Kamikaze Tokubetsu Kōgekitai, Dai 6 Hachiman-Gokō-tai)
  - Original unit; Usa NAG
    - No sorties.
- Hachiman-Gokō Unit No. 7 (神風特別攻撃隊 第七八幡護皇隊,, Kamikaze Tokubetsu Kōgekitai, Dai 7 Hachiman-Gokō-tai)
  - Original unit; Usa NAG
    - No sorties.
- Hachiman-Gokō Unit No. 8 (神風特別攻撃隊 第八八幡護皇隊,, Kamikaze Tokubetsu Kōgekitai, Dai 8 Hachiman-Gokō-tai)
  - Original unit; Usa NAG
    - No sorties.
- Hachiman-Gokō Unit No. 9 (神風特別攻撃隊 第九八幡護皇隊,, Kamikaze Tokubetsu Kōgekitai, Dai 9 Hachiman-Gokō-tai)
  - Original unit; Usa NAG
    - No sorties.
- Hachiman-Shinchū Unit (神風特別攻撃隊 八幡神忠隊,, Kamikaze Tokubetsu Kōgekitai, Hachiman-Shinchū-tai)
  - Original unit; Usa NAG
  - 28 April 1945
    - 3× B5N (attack); Allies ship off Naha.
- Hachiman-Shinbu Unit (神風特別攻撃隊 八幡振武隊,, Kamikaze Tokubetsu Kōgekitai, Hachiman-Shinbu-tai)
  - Original unit; Usa NAG
  - 4 May 1945
    - 3× B5N (attack); Allies ship off Okinawa Island.

=== Kamikaze Special Attack Group "Shirasagi Unit" ===
- Gokō-Shirasagi Unit No. 1 (神風特別攻撃隊 第一護皇白鷺隊,, Kamikaze Tokubetsu Kōgekitai, Dai 1 Gokō-Shirasagi-tai)
  - Original unit; Himeji NAG
  - 6 April 1945
    - 13× B5N (attack); Allies ship off Okinawa Island.
- Gokō-Shirasagi Unit No. 2 (神風特別攻撃隊 第二護皇白鷺隊,, Kamikaze Tokubetsu Kōgekitai, Dai 2 Gokō-Shirasagi-tai)
  - Original unit; Himeji NAG
  - 12 April 1945
    - 3× B5N (attack); Allies ship off Okinawa Island.
- Gokō-Shirasagi Unit No. 3 (神風特別攻撃隊 第三護皇白鷺隊,, Kamikaze Tokubetsu Kōgekitai, Dai 3 Gokō-Shirasagi-tai)
  - Original unit; Himeji NAG
  - 16 April 1945
    - 2× B5N (attack); Allies ship off Kadena.
- Shirasagi-Sekichū Unit (神風特別攻撃隊 白鷺赤忠隊,, Kamikaze Tokubetsu Kōgekitai, Shirasagi-Sekichū-tai)
  - Original unit; Himeji NAG
  - 28 April 1945
    - 1× B5N (attack); Allies ship off Naha.
- Shirasagi-Yōbu Unit (神風特別攻撃隊 白鷺揚武隊,, Kamikaze Tokubetsu Kōgekitai, Shirasagi-Yōbu-tai)
  - Original unit; Himeji NAG
  - 4 May 1945
    - 1× B5N (attack); Allies ship off Okinawa Island.

=== Kamikaze Special Attack Group "Seitō Unit" ===
- Seitō Unit No. 1 (神風特別攻撃隊 第一正統隊,, Kamikaze Tokubetsu Kōgekitai, Dai 1 Seitō-tai)
  - Original unit; Hyakurihara NAG
  - 6 April 1945
    - 14× D3A2 (attack); Allies convoy off Okinawa Island.
- Seitō Unit No. 2 (神風特別攻撃隊 第二正統隊,, Kamikaze Tokubetsu Kōgekitai, Dai 2 Seitō-tai)
  - Original unit; Hyakurihara NAG
  - 28 April 1945
    - 6× D3A2 (attack); Allies ship off Okinawa Island.
- Seitō Unit No. 3 (神風特別攻撃隊 第三正統隊,, Kamikaze Tokubetsu Kōgekitai, Dai 3 Seitō-tai)
  - Original unit; Hyakurihara NAG
  - 25 May 1945
    - 1× D3A2 (attack); Allies ship off Okinawa Island.
- Seitō Unit No. 4 (神風特別攻撃隊 第四正統隊,, Kamikaze Tokubetsu Kōgekitai, Dai 4 Seitō-tai)
  - Original unit; Hyakurihara NAG
  - 3 June 1945
    - 3× D3A2 (attack); Allies ship off Okinawa Island.

=== Kamikaze Special Attack Group "Seiki Unit" ===
- Seiki Unit No. 1 (神風特別攻撃隊 第一正気隊,, Kamikaze Tokubetsu Kōgekitai, Dai 1 Seiki-tai)
  - Original unit; Hyakurihara NAG
  - 28 April 1945
    - 2× B5N (attack); Allies ship off Naha.
- Seiki Unit No. 2 (神風特別攻撃隊 第二正気隊,, Kamikaze Tokubetsu Kōgekitai, Dai 2 Seiki-tai)
  - Original unit; Hyakurihara NAG
  - 4 May 1945
    - 1× B5N (attack); Allies ship off Okinawa Island.
- Seiki Unit No. 3 (神風特別攻撃隊 第三正気隊,, Kamikaze Tokubetsu Kōgekitai, Dai 3 Seiki-tai)
  - Original unit; Hyakurihara NAG
  - 12 May 1945
    - 1× B5N (attack); Allies ship off Okinawa Island.

=== Kamikaze Special Attack Group "Kusanagi Unit" ===
- Kusanagi Unit No. 1 (神風特別攻撃隊 第一草薙隊,, Kamikaze Tokubetsu Kōgekitai, Dai 1 Kusanagi-tai)
  - Original unit; Nagoya NAG
  - 6 April 1945
    - 13× D3A2 (attack); Allies convoy off Okinawa Island.
- Kusanagi Unit No. 2 (神風特別攻撃隊 第二草薙隊,, Kamikaze Tokubetsu Kōgekitai, Dai 2 Kusanagi-tai)
  - Original unit; Nagoya NAG
  - 12 April 1945
    - 2× D3A2 (attack); Allies convoy off Okinawa Island.
- Kusanagi Unit No. 3 (神風特別攻撃隊 第三草薙隊,, Kamikaze Tokubetsu Kōgekitai, Dai 3 Kusanagi-tai)
  - Original unit; Nagoya NAG
  - 28 April 1945
    - 13× D3A2 (attack); Allies convoy off Okinawa Island.

=== Kamikaze Special Attack Group "Mitate Unit" ===
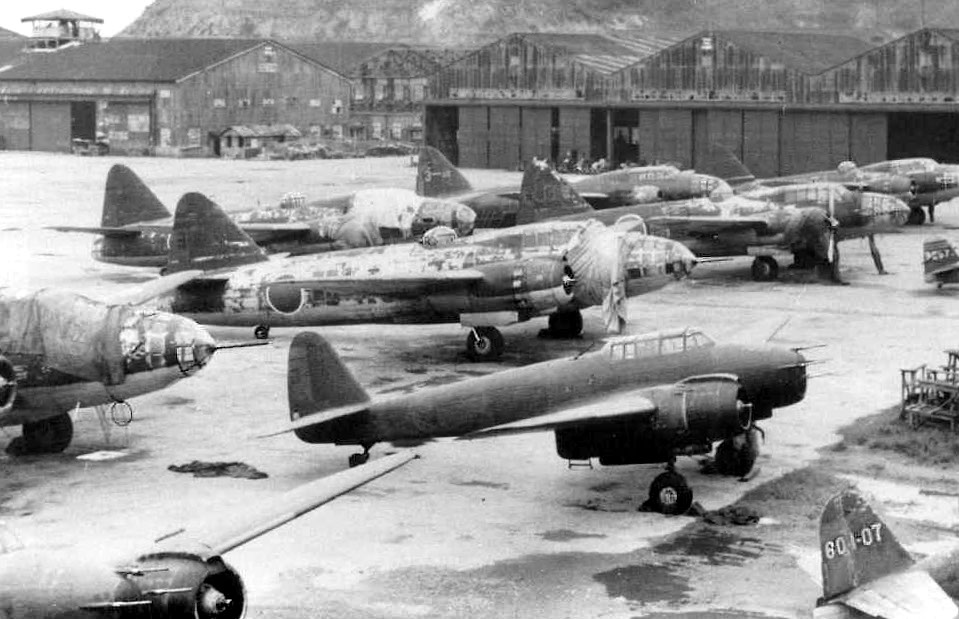
Mitsubishi G4M3 "Betty" 3-Ha (back row center) of Mitate Unit No. 6, October 1945.

- 1st Mitate Special Attack Group, Special Strafing Unit (第一御楯特別攻撃隊 特別銃撃隊,, Dai 1 Mitate Tokubetsu Kōgekitai, Tokubetsu Jūgeki-tai)
  - Original unit; 252nd NAG (317th FS), 752nd NAG (12th RS)
  - 26 November 1944
    - 12× A6M5c (strafe), 2× C6N1 (guidance); B-29's base the Isely Field and Kobler Field in Saipan.
- Mitate Unit No. 2 (神風特別攻撃隊 第二御楯隊,, Kamikaze Tokubetsu Kōgekitai, Dai 2 Mitate-tai)
  - Original unit; 601st NAG (310th FS, 1st AS, 254th AS)
  - 21 February 1945
    - 12× D4Y3, 8× B5N2 (attack), 12× A6M5c (escort); U.S. ship off Iwo Jima.
  - 1 March 1945
    - 1× D4Y3 (attack); U.S. ship off Iwo Jima.
- Mitate Unit No. 3,"252nd Group" (神風特別攻撃隊 第三御楯隊 "第二五二部隊",, Kamikaze Tokubetsu Kōgekitai, Dai 3 Mitate-tai, "Dai Futa-Go-Futa Butai")
  - Original unit; 252nd NAG (304th FS, 313th FS, 3rd AS, 5th AS)
  - 3 April 1945
    - 2× D4Y, 2× A6M (attack); Allies carrier task force south off Amami Ōshima.
  - 6 April 1945
    - 1× D4Y, 3× A6M (attack); Allies carrier task force, TA 142°-70 nmi from Amami Ōshima.
    - 3× D4Y (attack), Allies carrier task force, TA 100°-75 nmi from Naha.
  - 7 April 1945
    - 5× A6M (attack); Allies carrier task force, TA 132°-90 nmi from Amami Ōshima.
  - 11 April 1945
    - 3× D4Y, 2× A6M (attack); Allies carrier task force, TA 132°-100 nmi from Amami Ōshima.
  - 17 April 1945
    - 4× D4Y (attack); Allies carrier task force, TA 132°-100 nmi from Amami Ōshima.
  - 22 April 1945
    - 2× D4Y, 2× A6M (attack); Allies carrier task force, TA 145-90 nmi from Amami Ōshima.
- Mitate Unit No. 3, "601st Group" (神風特別攻撃隊 第三御楯隊 "第六〇一部隊",, Kamikaze Tokubetsu Kōgekitai, Dai 3 Mitate-tai, "Dai Roku-Maru-Hito Butai")
  - Original unit; 601st NAG (308th FS, 310th FS, 1st AS)
  - 3 April 1945
    - 4× D4Y3 (attack); Allies carrier task force, TA 97°-60 nmi from northern Okinawa Island.
  - 6 April 1945
    - 2× D4Y3 (attack); Allies carrier task force, TA 90°-85 nmi from northern Okinawa Island.
  - 7 April 1945
    - 11× D4Y3 (attack); Allies carrier task force, TA 90°-110 nmi from northern Okinawa Island.
  - 11 April 1945
    - 2× A6M (attack); Allies carrier task force, TA 155°-80 nmi from Kikai Island.
  - 15 April 1945
    - 2× A6M (strafing run); Naka Air Field, Okinawa Island.
  - 16 April 1945
    - 2× A6M (attack); Allies carrier task force, TA 140°-60 nmi from Kikai Island.
  - 17 April 1945
    - 4× D4Y3 (attack); Allies carrier task force, TA 155°-80 nmi from Kikai Island.
    - 2× A6M (attack); Allies carrier task force, TA 140°-60 nmi from Kikai Island.
    - 1× A6M (attack); Allies carrier task force, TA 150°-90 nmi from Kikai Island.
- Mitate Unit No. 3, "706th Group" (神風特別攻撃隊 第三御楯隊 "第七〇六部隊",, Kamikaze Tokubetsu Kōgekitai, Dai 3 Mitate-tai, "Dai Nana-Maru-Roku Butai")
  - Original unit; 706th NAG (405th AS)
  - 7 April 1945
    - 5× P1Y1 (attack); Allies ship off Okinawa Island.
- Mitate Unit No. 3, "Tenzan Group" (神風特別攻撃隊 第三御楯隊 "天山隊",, Kamikaze Tokubetsu Kōgekitai, Dai 3 Mitate-tai, "Tenzan-tai")
  - Original unit; 210th NAG
  - 6 April 1945
    - 1× B6N2 (attack); Allies ship off Okinawa Island.
- 4th Mitate Special Attack Group (第四御楯特別攻撃隊,, Dai 4 Mitate Tokubetsu Kōgekitai)
  - Original unit; 3rd Air Fleet (706th NAG), 5th Air Fleet (762nd NAG)
  - May 1945
    - 19× P1Y1 (attack), 2× H8K (guidance); No sorties, attack planes were used for the Operation Tan No. 3 at first. However, the Operation Tan No. 3 was canceled.
- Mitate Unit No. 4 (神風特別攻撃隊 第四御楯隊,, Kamikaze Tokubetsu Kōgekitai, Dai 4 Mitate-tai)
  - Original unit; 601st NAG (1st AS)
  - 9 August 1945
    - 6× D4Y (attack); U.S. carrier task force east off Cape Inubō.
    - 1× D4Y (attack); U.S. carrier task force, TA 105°-90 nmi from Kinkasan.
  - 13 August 1945
    - 4× D4Y (attack); U.S. carrier task force east off Cape Inubō.
  - 15 August 1945
    - 11× D4Y (attack); U.S. carrier task force east off Cape Inubō.
- Mitate Unit No. 5 (神風特別攻撃隊 第五御楯隊,, Kamikaze Tokubetsu Kōgekitai, Dai 5 Mitate-tai)
  - Original unit; 706th NAG (405th AS)
    - No sorties, all planes were use for the Operation Tan No. 4 at first. However, the Operation Tan No. 4 was canceled.
- Mitate Unit No. 6 (神風特別攻撃隊 第六御楯隊,, Kamikaze Tokubetsu Kōgekitai, Dai 6 Mitate-tai)
  - Original unit; 706th NAG (405th AS, 704th AS, 708th AS)
    - 36× P1Y1 (bombing), 36× P1Y1 (strafing run), 30× G4M (airborne); Use for Operation Ken-Gō (剣号作戦,, Ken-Gō Sakusen) at first, no sorties. Another known as Tenrai Special Attack Unit (天雷特別攻撃隊,, Tenrai Tokubetsu Kōgekitai).
- Mitate Unit No. 7, "Ryūsei Group" (神風特別攻撃隊 第七御楯隊 "流星隊",, Kamikaze Tokubetsu Kōgekitai, Dai 7 Mitate-tai, "Ryūsei-tai")
  - Original unit; 752nd NAG (5th AS)
  - 25 July 1945
    - 12× B7A2 (attack); U.S. carrier task force, TA 135°-200 nmi from Cape Daiō.
  - 9 August 1945
    - 5× B7A2 (attack); U.S. carrier task force, TA 90°-100 nmi from Kinkasan.
  - 13 August 1945
    - 3× B7A2 (attack); U.S. carrier task force, TA 70°-110 nmi from Cape Inubō.
  - 15 August 1945
    - 2× B7A2 (attack); U.S. carrier task force, TA 130°-200 nmi from Katsuura.

=== Kamikaze Special Attack Group "Ginga Unit" ===
- Ginga Unit No. 1 (神風特別攻撃隊 第一銀河隊,, Kamikaze Tokubetsu Kōgekitai, Dai 1 Ginga-tai)
  - Original unit; 762nd NAG (501st AS)
  - 27 March 1945
    - 5× P1Y1 (attack); Allies ship off Okinawa.
- Ginga Unit No. 2 (神風特別攻撃隊 第二銀河隊,, Kamikaze Tokubetsu Kōgekitai, Dai 2 Ginga-tai)
  - Original unit; 762nd NAG (501st AS)
  - 2 April 1945
    - 1× P1Y1 (attack); Allies ship southwest off Kyūshū.
- Ginga Unit No. 3 (神風特別攻撃隊 第三銀河隊,, Kamikaze Tokubetsu Kōgekitai, Dai 3 Ginga-tai)
  - Original unit; 762nd NAG (262nd AS)
  - 3 April 1945
    - 3× P1Y1 (attack); Allies ship south off Okinawa.
- Ginga Unit No. 4 (神風特別攻撃隊 第四銀河隊,, Kamikaze Tokubetsu Kōgekitai, Dai 4 Ginga-tai)
  - Original unit; 762nd NAG (262nd AS, 501st AS)
  - 7 April 1945
    - 4× P1Y1 (attack); Allies ship off Ryukyu Islands.
- Ginga Unit No. 5 (神風特別攻撃隊 第五銀河隊,, Kamikaze Tokubetsu Kōgekitai, Dai 5 Ginga-tai)
  - Original unit; 762nd NAG (262nd AS, 501st AS)
  - 11 April 1945
    - 5× P1Y1 (attack); Allies carrier task force south off Kikai Island.
- Ginga Unit No. 6 (神風特別攻撃隊 第六銀河隊,, Kamikaze Tokubetsu Kōgekitai, Dai 6 Ginga-tai)
  - Original unit; 762nd NAG (262nd AS)
  - 16 April 1945
    - 8× P1Y1 (attack); Allies carrier task force south off Kikai Island.
- Ginga Unit No. 7 (神風特別攻撃隊 第七銀河隊,, Kamikaze Tokubetsu Kōgekitai, Dai 7 Ginga-tai)
  - Original unit; 762nd NAG (406th AS)
  - 16 April 1945
    - 4× P1Y1 (attack); Allies carrier task force, TA 155°-50 nmi from Kikai Island.
- Ginga Unit No. 8 (神風特別攻撃隊 第八銀河隊,, Kamikaze Tokubetsu Kōgekitai, Dai 8 Ginga-tai)
  - Original unit; 762nd NAG (406th AS)
  - 17 April 1945
    - 1× P1Y1 (attack); Allies carrier task force off Kikai Island.
- Ginga Unit No. 9 (神風特別攻撃隊 第九銀河隊,, Kamikaze Tokubetsu Kōgekitai, Dai 9 Ginga-tai)
  - Original unit; 762nd NAG (406th AS, 501st AS)
  - 11 May 1945
    - 6× P1Y1 (attack); Allies ship south off Okinawa.
- Ginga Unit No. 10 (神風特別攻撃隊 第十銀河隊,, Kamikaze Tokubetsu Kōgekitai, Dai 10 Ginga-tai)
  - Original unit; 752nd NAG (705th AS), 762nd NAG (406th AS)
  - 25 May 1945
    - 2× P1Y1 (attack); Allies ship off Okinawa.
    - 1× P1Y1 (attack); Allies ship east off Okinawa.

=== Kamikaze Special Attack Group "Sakigake Unit" ===
- Sakigake Unit No. 1 (神風特別攻撃隊 第一魁隊,, Kamikaze Tokubetsu Kōgekitai, Dai 1 Sakigake-tai)
  - Original unit; Kitaura NAG
  - 4 May 1945
    - 2× E13A, 3× E7K2 (attack); Allies ship off Okinoerabujima.
    - 3× E7K2 (attack); Allies ship off Okinawa.
- Sakigake Unit No. 2 (神風特別攻撃隊 第二魁隊,, Kamikaze Tokubetsu Kōgekitai, Dai 2 Sakigake-tai)
  - Original unit; Kashima NAG
  - 4 May 1945
    - 1× E13A, 1× E7K (attack); Allies ship off Okinawa.

=== Kamikaze Special Attack Group "Kotohira Unit" ===
- Kotohira-Suishin Unit (神風特別攻撃隊 琴平水心隊,, Kamikaze Tokubetsu Kōgekitai, Kotohira-Suishin-tai)
  - Original unit; Takuma NAG
  - 29 April 1945
    - 4×E13A, 16× E7K (attack); Allies ship off Okinawa.
  - 4 May 1945
    - 3× E13A, 12× E7K (attack); Allies ship off Okinawa.
  - 10 May 1945
    - 1× E13A (attack); Allies ship off Okinawa, mission failed and aircraft was return to base.
  - 28 May 1945
    - 1× E13A, 4× E7K (attack); Allies ship off Okinawa.
- Kotohira-Reconnaissance seaplane Unit (神風特別攻撃隊 琴平水偵隊,, Kamikaze Tokubetsu Kōgekitai, Kotohira-Suitei-tai)
  - Original unit; Fukuyama NAG
  - 25 June 1945
    - 5× F1M2 (attack); Allies ship off Okinawa.
  - 27 June 1945
    - 1× F1M2 (attack); Allies ship off Okinawa.
  - 28 June 1945
    - 1× F1M2 (attack); Allies ship off Okinawa.

=== Kamikaze Special Attack Group "Tokushima-Shiragiku Unit" ===
- Tokushima-Shiragiku Unit No. 1 (神風特別攻撃隊 徳島第一白菊隊,, Kamikaze Tokubetsu Kōgekitai, Tokushima Dai 1 Shiragiku-tai)
  - Original unit; Tokushima NAG
  - 24 May 1945
    - 11× K11W (attack); Allies ship off Okinawa.
- Tokushima-Shiragiku Unit No. 2 (神風特別攻撃隊 徳島第二白菊隊,, Kamikaze Tokubetsu Kōgekitai, Tokushima Dai 2 Shiragiku-tai)
  - Original unit; Tokushima NAG, Kōchi NAG
  - 27 May 1945
    - 7× K11W (attack); Allies ship off Okinawa.
- Tokushima-Shiragiku Unit No. 3 (神風特別攻撃隊 徳島第三白菊隊,, Kamikaze Tokubetsu Kōgekitai, Tokushima Dai 3 Shiragiku-tai)
  - Original unit; Tokushima NAG, Kōchi NAG
  - 28 May 1945
    - 4× K11W (attack); Allies ship off Okinawa.
- Tokushima-Shiragiku Unit No. 4 (神風特別攻撃隊 徳島第四白菊隊,, Kamikaze Tokubetsu Kōgekitai, Tokushima Dai 4 Shiragiku-tai)
  - Original unit; Tokushima NAG
  - 21 June 1945
    - 3× K11W (attack); Allies ship off Okinawa.
- Tokushima-Shiragiku Unit No. 5 (神風特別攻撃隊 徳島第五白菊隊,, Kamikaze Tokubetsu Kōgekitai, Tokushima Dai 5 Shiragiku-tai)
  - Original unit; Tokushima NAG, Kōchi NAG
  - 25 June 1945
    - 5× K11W (attack); Allies ship off Okinawa.

=== Kamikaze Special Attack Group "Ryūko Unit" ===
- Ryūko Unit No. 1 (神風特別攻撃隊 第一龍虎隊,, Kamikaze Tokubetsu Kōgekitai, Dai 1 Ryūko-tai)
  - Original unit; 205th NAG
    - 8× K5Y; No sorties.
- Ryūko Unit No. 2 (神風特別攻撃隊 第二龍虎隊,, Kamikaze Tokubetsu Kōgekitai, Dai 2 Ryūko-tai)
  - Original unit; 205th NAG
    - 8× K5Y; No sorties.
- Ryūko Unit No. 3 (神風特別攻撃隊 第三龍虎隊,, Kamikaze Tokubetsu Kōgekitai, Dai 3 Ryūko-tai)
  - Original unit; 205th NAG
  - 29 July 1945
    - 6× K5Y (attack); U.S. ship in Kerama Islands.

== Kamikaze Special Attack Group "Kikusui Corps" ==
- Kikusui Corps, Azusa Special Attack Unit (菊水部隊 梓特別攻撃隊,, Kikusui Butai, Azusa Tokubetsu Kōgekitai)
  - Original unit; 762nd NAG (262nd AS), 801st NAG
  - 11 March 1945
    - 24× P1Y1 (attack), 3× H8K2 (guidance); U.S. aircraft carrier in Ulithi atoll under the Operation Tan No. 2.
- Kamikaze Special Attack Group, Kikusui Corps, Ginga Unit (神風特別攻撃隊 菊水部隊 銀河隊,, Kamikaze Tokubetsu Kōgekitai, Kikusui Butai, Ginga-tai)
  - Original unit; 762nd NAG (262nd AS, 406th AS, 501st AS)
  - 18 March 1945
    - 9× P1Y1 (attack), 1× P1Y1 (radar); Allies carrier task fore east off Kyūshū.
  - 19 March 1945
    - 5× P1Y1 (attack); Allies carrier task fore east off Kyūshū.
  - 20 March 1945
    - 2× P1Y1 (attack); Allies carrier task fore east off Kyūshū.
  - 21 March 1945
    - 14× P1Y1 (attack); Allies carrier task fore east off Kyūshū.
- Kamikaze Special Attack Group, Kikusui Corps, Suisei Unit (神風特別攻撃隊 菊水部隊 彗星隊,, Kamikaze Tokubetsu Kōgekitai, Kikusui Butai, Suisei-tai)
  - Original unit; 701st NAG (103rd AS, 105th AS)
  - 18 March 1945
    - 18× D4Y3 (attack), 3× A6M (escort); Allies carrier task fore east off Kyūshū.
  - 19 March 1945
    - 14× D4Y3 (attack); Allies carrier task fore east off Kyūshū.
  - 20 March 1945
    - 7× D4Y3 (attack), 2× A6M (escort); Allies carrier task fore east off Kyūshū.
- Kamikaze Special Attack Group, Kikusui Corps, Suisei Unit No. 2 (神風特別攻撃隊 菊水部隊 第二彗星隊,, Kamikaze Tokubetsu Kōgekitai, Kikusui Butai, Dai 2 Suisei-tai)
  - Original unit; 701st NAG (311th FS, 5th AS, 103rd AS, 105th AS)
  - 27 March 1945
    - 10× D4Y3 (attack); Allies carrier task fore off Okinawa.
  - 29 March 1945
    - 2× D4Y3 (attack); Allies carrier task fore south of 30 nmi from Tanegashima.
  - 16 April 1945
    - 3× D4Y3 (attack); Allies carrier task fore southeast of 50 nmi from Kikai Island.
- Kamikaze Special Attack Group, Kikusui Corps, Tenzan Unit (神風特別攻撃隊 菊水部隊 天山隊,, Kamikaze Tokubetsu Kōgekitai, Kikusui Butai, Tenzan-tai)
  - Original unit; 131st NAG (254th AS, 256th AS), 701st NAG (251st AS)
  - 6 April 1945
    - 10× B6N2 (attack); Allies carrier task fore off Okinawa.
- Kamikaze Special Attack Group, Kikusui Corps, Ten'ō Unit (神風特別攻撃隊 菊水部隊 天櫻隊,, Kamikaze Tokubetsu Kōgekitai, Kikusui Butai, Ten'ō-tai)
  - Original unit; 701st NAG (251st AS), 901st NAG
  - 16 April 1945
    - 7× B6N2 (attack); Allies ship off Okinawa.
- Kamikaze Special Attack Group, Kikusui Raiō Unit (神風特別攻撃隊 菊水雷櫻隊,, Kamikaze Tokubetsu Kōgekitai, Kikusui Raiō-tai)
  - Original unit; 931st NAG (251st AS)
  - 11 May 1945
    - 10× B6N2 (attack); Allies ship off Okinawa.
- Kamikaze Special Attack Group, Kikusui Corps, Shiragiku Unit (神風特別攻撃隊 菊水部隊 白菊隊,, Kamikaze Tokubetsu Kōgekitai, Kikusui Butai, Shiragiku-tai)
  - Original unit; Kōchi NAG
  - 24 May 1945
    - 8× K11W (attack); Allies ship off Okinawa.
  - 25 May 1945
    - 1× K11W (attack); Allies ship off Okinawa.
  - 27 May 1945
    - 9× K11W (attack); Allies ship off Okinawa.
- Kamikaze Special Attack Group, Kikusui Corps, Shiragiku Unit No. 2 (神風特別攻撃隊 菊水部隊 第二白菊隊,, Kamikaze Tokubetsu Kōgekitai, Kikusui Butai, Dai 2 Shiragiku-tai)
  - Original unit; Kōchi NAG
  - 21 June 1945
    - 5× K11W (attack); Allies ship off Okinawa.
- Kamikaze Special Attack Group, Kikusui Corps, Shiragiku Unit No. 3 (神風特別攻撃隊 菊水部隊 第三白菊隊,, Kamikaze Tokubetsu Kōgekitai, Kikusui Butai, Dai 3 Shiragiku-tai)
  - Original unit; Kōchi NAG
  - 26 June 1945
    - 1× K11W (attack); Allies ship off Okinawa.

== Kamikaze Special Attack Group "Jinrai Corps" ==
- 1st Kamikaze Ōka Special Attack Group, Jinrai Corps, Attack Unit (第一神風櫻花特別攻撃隊 神雷部隊 攻撃隊,, Dai 1 Kamikaze-Ōka Tokubetsu Kōgekitai, Jinrai Butai, Kōgeki-tai)
- 1st Kamikaze Ōka Special Attack Group, Jinrai Corps, Ōka Unit (第一神風櫻花特別攻撃隊 神雷部隊 櫻花隊,, Dai 1 Kamikaze-Ōka Tokubetsu Kōgekitai, Jinrai Butai, Ōka-tai)
- 1st Kamikaze Ōka Special Attack Group, Jinrai Corps, Fighter Unit (第一神風櫻花特別攻撃隊 神雷部隊 戦闘隊,, Dai 1 Kamikaze-Ōka Tokubetsu Kōgekitai, Jinrai Butai, Sentō-tai)
  - Original unit; 721st NAG (306th FS, 307th FS, 711th AS)
  - 21 March 1945
    - 3× G4M2 (guidance), 15× G4M2E (MXY7 mothership), 15× MXY7 (attack), 32× A6M (escort); U.S. aircraft carrier southeast off 320 nmi from Cape Toi.
- 2nd Kamikaze Ōka Special Attack Group, Jinrai Corps, Ōka Attack Unit (第二神風櫻花特別攻撃隊 神雷部隊 櫻花隊攻撃隊,, Dai 2 Kamikaze-Ōka Tokubetsu Kōgekitai, Jinrai Butai, Ōka-tai Kōgeki-tai)
  - Original unit; 721st NAG (708th AS)
  - 1 April 1945
    - 6× G4M2E (MXY7 mothership), 6× MXY7 (attack); Allies carrier task force off Okinawa.
- 3rd Kamikaze Ōka Special Attack Group, Jinrai Corps, Ōka Attack Unit (第三神風櫻花特別攻撃隊 神雷部隊 櫻花隊攻撃隊,, Dai 3 Kamikaze-Ōka Tokubetsu Kōgekitai, Jinrai Butai, Ōka-tai Kōgeki-tai)
  - Original unit; 721st NAG (708th AS)
  - 12 April 1945
    - 8× G4M2E (MXY7 mothership), 8× MXY7 (attack); Allies carrier task force off Okinawa.
- 4th Kamikaze Ōka Special Attack Group, Jinrai Corps, Ōka Attack Unit (第四神風櫻花特別攻撃隊 神雷部隊 櫻花隊攻撃隊,, Dai 4 Kamikaze-Ōka Tokubetsu Kōgekitai, Jinrai Butai, Ōka-tai Kōgeki-tai)
  - Original unit; 721st NAG (708th AS)
  - 14 April 1945
    - 7× G4M2E (MXY7 mothership), 7× MXY7 (attack); Allies carrier task force east off Tokunoshima.
- 5th Kamikaze Ōka Special Attack Group, Jinrai Corps, Ōka Attack Unit (第五神風櫻花特別攻撃隊 神雷部隊 櫻花隊攻撃隊,, Dai 5 Kamikaze-Ōka Tokubetsu Kōgekitai, Jinrai Butai, Ōka-tai Kōgeki-tai)
  - Original unit; 721st NAG (708th AS)
  - 16 April 1945
    - 6× G4M2E (MXY7 mothership), 6× MXY7 (attack); Allies ship off Okinawa.
- 6th Kamikaze Ōka Special Attack Group, Jinrai Corps, Ōka Unit (第六神風櫻花特別攻撃隊 神雷部隊 櫻花隊,, Dai 6 Kamikaze-Ōka Tokubetsu Kōgekitai, Jinrai Butai, Ōka-tai)
  - Original unit; 721st NAG
  - 28 April 1945
    - 4× G4M2E (MXY7 mothership), 4× MXY7 (attack); Allies ship off Okinawa.
- 7th Kamikaze Ōka Special Attack Group, Jinrai Corps, Ōka Attack Unit (第七神風櫻花特別攻撃隊 神雷部隊 櫻花隊攻撃隊,, Dai 7 Kamikaze-Ōka Tokubetsu Kōgekitai, Jinrai Butai, Ōka-tai Kōgeki-tai)
  - Original unit; 721st NAG (708th AS, 711th AS)
  - 4 May 1945
    - 7× G4M2E (MXY7 mothership), 7× MXY7 (attack); Allies ship off Okinawa.
- 8th Kamikaze Ōka Special Attack Group, Jinrai Corps, Ōka Attack Unit (第八神風櫻花特別攻撃隊 神雷部隊 櫻花隊攻撃隊,, Dai 8 Kamikaze-Ōka Tokubetsu Kōgekitai, Jinrai Butai, Ōka-tai Kōgeki-tai)
  - Original unit; 721st NAG (708th AS)
  - 11 May 1945
    - 4× G4M2E (MXY7 mothership), 4× MXY7 (attack); Allies ship off Okinawa.
- 9th Kamikaze Ōka Special Attack Group, Jinrai Corps, Attack Unit (第九神風櫻花特別攻撃隊 神雷部隊 攻撃隊,, Dai 9 Kamikaze-Ōka Tokubetsu Kōgekitai, Jinrai Butai, Kōgeki-tai)
- 9th Kamikaze Ōka Special Attack Group, Jinrai Corps, Ōka Unit (第九神風櫻花特別攻撃隊 神雷部隊 櫻花隊,, Dai 9 Kamikaze-Ōka Tokubetsu Kōgekitai, Jinrai Butai, Ōka-tai)
  - Original unit; 721st NAG (708th AS)
  - 25 May 1945
    - 3× G4M2E (MXY7 mothership), 3× MXY7 (attack); Allies ship off Okinawa.
- 10th Kamikaze Ōka Special Attack Group, Jinrai Corps, Attack Unit (第十神風櫻花特別攻撃隊 神雷部隊 攻撃隊,, Dai 10 Kamikaze-Ōka Tokubetsu Kōgekitai, Jinrai Butai, Kōgeki-tai)
- 10th Kamikaze Ōka Special Attack Group, Jinrai Corps, Ōka Unit (第十神風櫻花特別攻撃隊 神雷部隊 櫻花隊,, Dai 10 Kamikaze-Ōka Tokubetsu Kōgekitai, Jinrai Butai, Ōka-tai)
  - Original unit; 721st NAG (708th AS)
  - 22 June 1945
    - 6× G4M2E (MXY7 mothership), 6× MXY7 (attack); Allies ship off Okinawa.
- Kamikaze Special Attack Group, Jinrai Corps, Kenmu Unit No. 1 (神風特別攻撃隊 神雷部隊 第一建武隊,, Kamikaze Tokubetsu Kōgekitai, Jinrai Butai, Dai 1 Kenmu-tai)
  - Original unit; 721st NAG
  - 2 April 1945
    - 30× A6M5 (attack); Allies ship off Okinawa.
- Kamikaze Special Attack Group, Jinrai Corps, Kenmu Unit No. 2 (神風特別攻撃隊 神雷部隊 第二建武隊,, Kamikaze Tokubetsu Kōgekitai, Jinrai Butai, Dai 2 Kenmu-tai)
  - Original unit; 721st NAG
  - 3 April 1945
    - 22× A6M5 (attack); Allies carrier task force south off Amami Ōshima.
- Kamikaze Special Attack Group, Jinrai Corps, Kenmu Unit No. 3 (神風特別攻撃隊 神雷部隊 第三建武隊,, Kamikaze Tokubetsu Kōgekitai, Jinrai Butai, Dai 3 Kenmu-tai)
  - Original unit; 721st NAG
  - 6 April 1945
    - 19× A6M5 (attack); Allies carrier task force, TA 190°-76 nmi from Kikai Island.
- Kamikaze Special Attack Group, Jinrai Corps, Kenmu Unit No. 4 (神風特別攻撃隊 神雷部隊 第四建武隊,, Kamikaze Tokubetsu Kōgekitai, Jinrai Butai, Dai 4 Kenmu-tai)
  - Original unit; 721st NAG
  - 7 April 1945
    - 12× A6M5 (attack); Allies carrier task force south off Kikai Island.
- Kamikaze Special Attack Group, Jinrai Corps, Kenmu Unit No. 5 (神風特別攻撃隊 神雷部隊 第五建武隊,, Kamikaze Tokubetsu Kōgekitai, Jinrai Butai, Dai 5 Kenmu-tai)
  - Original unit; 721st NAG
  - 11 April 1945
    - 13× A6M5 (attack); Allies carrier task force south off Kikai Island.
- Kamikaze Special Attack Group, Jinrai Corps, Kenmu Unit No. 6 (神風特別攻撃隊 神雷部隊 第六建武隊,, Kamikaze Tokubetsu Kōgekitai, Jinrai Butai, Dai 6 Kenmu-tai)
  - Original unit; 721st NAG
  - 14 April 1945
    - 6× A6M5 (attack); Allies carrier task force east off Tokunoshima.
- Kamikaze Special Attack Group, Jinrai Corps, Kenmu Unit No. 7 (神風特別攻撃隊 神雷部隊 第七建武隊,, Kamikaze Tokubetsu Kōgekitai, Jinrai Butai, Dai 7 Kenmu-tai)
  - Original unit; 721st NAG
  - 16 April 1945
    - 12× A6M5 (attack); Allies carrier task force, southeast of 55 nmi and south of 50 nmi from Kikai Island.
- Kamikaze Special Attack Group, Jinrai Corps, Kenmu Unit No. 8 (神風特別攻撃隊 神雷部隊 第八建武隊,, Kamikaze Tokubetsu Kōgekitai, Jinrai Butai, Dai 8 Kenmu-tai)
  - Original unit; 721st NAG
  - 16 April 1945
    - 12× A6M5 (attack); Allies carrier task force, east of 50 nmi and south of 100 nmi from Kikai Island.
- Kamikaze Special Attack Group, Jinrai Corps, Kenmu Unit No. 9 (神風特別攻撃隊 神雷部隊 第九建武隊,, Kamikaze Tokubetsu Kōgekitai, Jinrai Butai, Dai 9 Kenmu-tai)
  - Original unit; 721st NAG
  - 29 April 1945
    - 12× A6M5 (attack); Allies carrier task force, TA 120°-60 nmi and TA 90°-70 nmi from northern Okinawa Island.
- Kamikaze Special Attack Group, Jinrai Corps, Kenmu Unit No. 10 (神風特別攻撃隊 神雷部隊 第十建武隊,, Kamikaze Tokubetsu Kōgekitai, Jinrai Butai, Dai 10 Kenmu-tai)
  - Original unit; 721st NAG
  - 11 May 1945
    - 4× A6M5 (attack); Search and attack Allies carrier task force off Okinawa.
- Kamikaze Special Attack Group, Jinrai Corps, Kenmu Unit No. 11 (神風特別攻撃隊 神雷部隊 第十一建武隊,, Kamikaze Tokubetsu Kōgekitai, Jinrai Butai, Dai 11 Kenmu-tai)
  - Original unit; 721st NAG
  - 14 May 1945
    - 5× A6M5 (attack); Search and attack Allies carrier task force east off Tanegashima.
- Kamikaze Special Attack Group, Jinrai Fighter-Bomber Unit No. 1 (神風特別攻撃隊 第一神雷爆戦隊,, Kamikaze Tokubetsu Kōgekitai, Dai 1 Jinrai Bakusen-tai)
  - Original unit; 721st NAG (306th FS)
  - 22 June 1945
    - 7× A6M5 (attack); Allies ship off Okinawa.
- Kamikaze Special Attack Group, Jinrai Fighter-Bomber Unit No. 2 (神風特別攻撃隊 第二神雷爆戦隊,, Kamikaze Tokubetsu Kōgekitai, Dai 2 Jinrai Bakusen-tai)
  - Original unit; 721st NAG (306th FS)
  - 13 August 1945
    - 2× A6M5 (attack); Allies ship off Okinawa.

== Other Kamikazes ==
- Gekkō Unit (神風特別攻撃隊 月光隊,, Kamikaze Tokubetsu Kōgekitai, Gekkō-tai)
  - Original unit; 153rd NAG (812th FS), 765th NAG (804th FS)
  - 28 December 1944
    - 1× J1N1-S (attack); U.S. convoy in Bohol Sea.
  - 3 January 1945
    - 1× J1N1-S (guidance); Guiding for Kongō Unit No. 30, suicide attack after guiding.
- Kyokujitsu Unit (神風特別攻撃隊 旭日隊,, Kamikaze Tokubetsu Kōgekitai, Kyokujitsu-tai)
  - Original unit; 765th NAG (102nd AS)
  - 3 January 1945
    - 1× D4Y (attack); U.S. carrier task force in Bohol Sea.
  - 5 January 1945
    - 1× D4Y (attack); U.S. convoy off Iba.
  - 6 January 1945
    - 1× D4Y (attack); U.S. convoy west of Bohol Sea.
    - 1× D4Y (attack); U.S. aircraft carrier off Lingayen Gulf.
  - 7 January 1945
    - 1× D4Y (attack); U.S. ship in Lingayen Gulf.
- Hachiman Unit (神風特別攻撃隊 八幡隊,, Kamikaze Tokubetsu Kōgekitai, Hachiman-tai)
  - Original unit; 761st NAG (252nd AS)
  - 6 January 1945
    - 1× B6N (attack); U.S. ship in Lingayen Gulf.
  - 8 January 1945
    - 1× B6N (attack); U.S. ship in Lingayen Gulf.
- 1st Air Fleet Reisen Unit (神風特別攻撃隊 第一航空艦隊零戦隊,, Kamikaze Tokubetsu Kōgekitai, Dai 1 Kōkū Kantai Reisen-tai)
  - Original unit; 221st NAG (317th FS)
  - 21 January 1945
    - 2× A6M (attack); U.S. carrier task force, TA 93°-93 nmi from Taitung.
- Koroku-Suisei Unit (神風特別攻撃隊 小禄彗星隊,, Kamikaze Tokubetsu Kōgekitai, Koroku-Suisei-tai)
  - Original unit; 701st NAG (103rd AS)
  - 24 March 1945
    - 1× D4Y3 (attack); Allies carrier task force off Okinawa.
  - 25 March 1945
    - 1× D4Y3 (attack); Allies ship off Okinawa.
- Yūbu Unit (神風特別攻撃隊 勇武隊,, Kamikaze Tokubetsu Kōgekitai, Yūbu-tai)
  - Original unit; 765th NAG (102nd AS, 401st AS)
  - 25 March 1945
    - 3× P1Y1 (attack), 1× D4Y3 (escort); Allies carrier task force south off Okinawa.
  - 6 April 1945
    - 3× P1Y1 (attack); Allies ship off Okinawa.
- Chūsei Unit (神風特別攻撃隊 忠誠隊,, Kamikaze Tokubetsu Kōgekitai, Chūsei-tai)
  - Original unit; 765th NAG (102nd AS)
  - 1 April 1945
    - 1× D4Y3 (attack); Allies carrier task force south off Ishigaki Island.
  - 3 April 1945
    - 1× D4Y3 (attack); Allies carrier task force south off Okinawa.
  - 6 April 1945
    - 3× D4Y3 (attack); Allies carrier task force south off Ishigaki Island.
  - 16 April 1945
    - 1× D4Y3 (attack); Allies carrier task force south off Ishigaki Island.
  - 28 April 1945
    - 1× D4Y3 (attack); Allies carrier task force east off Miyako-jima.
  - 4 May 1945
    - 1× D4Y3 (attack); Allies carrier task force south off Miyako-jima.
  - 9 May 1945
    - 1× D4Y3 (attack); Allies ship off Kadena.
    - 1× D4Y3, 1× D1A2 (attack); Allies ship off Kerama Islands.
  - 13 May 1945
    - 7× D1A2 (attack); Allies ship off Kerama Islands.
  - 15 May 1945
    - 1× D4Y3 (attack); Allies ship off Kerama Islands.
  - 17 May 1945
    - 1× D1A2 (attack); Allies ship off Kerama Islands.
- 210th Naval Air Group, Reisen Unit (神風特別攻撃隊 第二一〇部隊 零戦隊,, Kamikaze Tokubetsu Kōgekitai, Dai Futa-Hito-Maru Butai, Reisen-tai)
  - Original unit; 210th NAG
  - 6 April 1945
    - 12× A6M (attack), 10× N1K1-J (escort); Allies carrier task force south of 80 nmi from Tokunoshima.
  - 11 April 1945
    - 3× A6M (attack); Allies carrier task force east off Okinawa.
- 210th Naval Air Group, Suisei Unit (神風特別攻撃隊 第二一〇部隊 彗星隊,, Kamikaze Tokubetsu Kōgekitai, Dai Futa-Hito-Maru Butai, Suisei-tai)
  - Original unit; 210th NAG
  - 6 April 1945
    - 13× D4Y3 (attack); Allies carrier task force, TA 91°-85 nmi from Okinawa Island.
  - 11 April 1945
    - 2× D4Y3 (attack); Allies carrier task force south off Tokunoshima.
- Shisei Unit No. 2 (神風特別攻撃隊 第二至誠隊,, Kamikaze Tokubetsu Kōgekitai, Dai 2 Shisei-tai)
  - Original unit; 951st NAG
  - 12 April 1945
    - 1× D3A (attack); Allies ship west off Okinawa.
- Kiichi Unit (神風特別攻撃隊 帰一隊,, Kamikaze Tokubetsu Kōgekitai, Kiichi-tai)
  - Original unit; 763rd NAG (252nd AS)
  - 3 May 1945
    - 1× B6N2 (attack); Allies ship off Okinawa.
- Shinten Unit (神風特別攻撃隊 振天隊,, Kamikaze Tokubetsu Kōgekitai, Shinten-tai)
  - Original unit; 12th AG, 331st NAG (253rd AS), 381st NAG, 765th NAG (102nd AS)
  - 3 May 1945
    - 1× B5N, 2× D3A2 (attack); Allies ship off Okinawa Island.
  - 4 May 1945
    - 1× D3A2 (attack); Allies ship off Okinawa.
  - 9 May 1945
    - 3× D3A2 (attack); Allies ship off Okinawa.
  - 13 May 1945
    - 1× B5N (attack); Allies ship off Okinawa.
  - 15 May 1945
    - 2× B5N (attack); Allies ship off Okinawa.
  - 29 May 1945
    - 2× B5N (attack); Allies ship off Okinawa.
- Tokiwachūka Unit (神風特別攻撃隊 常盤忠華隊,, Kamikaze Tokubetsu Kōgekitai, Tokiwachūka-tai)
  - Original unit; Hyakurihara NAG
  - 12 April 1945
    - 6× B5N (attack); Allies ship off Okinawa.
- Kōka Unit (神風特別攻撃隊 皇花隊,, Kamikaze Tokubetsu Kōgekitai, Kōka-tai)
  - Original unit; Hyakurihara NAG
  - 16 April 1945
    - 4× B5N (attack); Allies ship off Kadena.
- 12th Air Flotilla, Two-Seat Reconnaissance seaplane Unit (神風特別攻撃隊 第十二航空戦隊 二座水偵隊,, Kamikaze Tokubetsu Kōgekitai, Dai 12 Kōkū Sentai, 2-Za Suitei-tai)
  - Original unit; Amakusa NAG
  - 24 May 1945
    - 2× F1M2 (attack); Allies ship off Okinawa.
  - 21 June 1945
    - 5× F1M2 (attack); Allies ship off Okinawa.
  - 25 June 1945
    - 1× F1M2 (attack); Allies ship off Okinawa.
  - 3 July 1945
    - 1× F1M2 (attack); Allies ship off Okinawa.
- Ōyashima Unit (神風特別攻撃隊 大八州隊,, Kamikaze Tokubetsu Kōgekitai, Ōyashima-tai)
  - Original unit; Ōi NAG
    - K11W; No sorties.
- Kuroshio Unit (神風特別攻撃隊 黒潮隊,, Kamikaze Tokubetsu Kōgekitai, Kuroshio-tai)
  - Original unit; 903rd NAG
    - 5× E13A; No sorties, disbanded after the Operation Kikusui No. 1.
- Sairyū Unit (神風特別攻撃隊 彩流隊,, Kamikaze Tokubetsu Kōgekitai, Sairyū-tai)
  - Original unit; 752nd NAG (5th AS, 102nd RS)
    - B7A, C6N1; No sorties.
- Saiun Unit (神風特別攻撃隊 彩雲隊,, Kamikaze Tokubetsu Kōgekitai, Saiun-tai)
  - Original unit; 723rd NAG
    - C6N1; No sorties.
- Hishin Unit (神風特別攻撃隊 飛神隊,, Kamikaze Tokubetsu Kōgekitai, Hishin-tai)
  - Original unit; Mineyama NAG
    - K5Y; No sorties.
- Chihaya Unit (神風特別攻撃隊 千早隊,, Kamikaze Tokubetsu Kōgekitai, Chihaya-tai)
  - Original unit; Yamato NAG
    - K5Y; No sorties.
- Kaiten Unit (神風特別攻撃隊 回天隊,, Kamikaze Tokubetsu Kōgekitai, Kaiten-tai)
  - Original unit; Okazaki NAG
    - K5Y; No sorties.
- Shinryū Special Attack Unit (神風特別攻撃隊 神龍特別攻撃隊,, Kamikaze Tokubetsu Kōgekitai, Shinryū Tokubetsu Kōgekitai)
  - Original unit; 631st NAG, 1st Submarine Flotilla (Submarine I-400, I-401, I-13 and I-14)
    - 10× M6A1; Operation Hikari (光作戦,, Hikari Sakusen) at first. No sorties.
- Ōtsu Special Attack Unit (神風特別攻撃隊 大津特別攻撃隊,, Kamikaze Tokubetsu Kōgekitai, Ōtsu Tokubetsu Kōgekitai)
  - Original unit; Ōtsu NAG
    - 7× E7K; No sorties.
- Kashima Special Attack Unit (神風特別攻撃隊 鹿島特別攻撃隊,, Kamikaze Tokubetsu Kōgekitai, Kashima Tokubetsu Kōgekitai)
  - Original unit; Kashima NAG
    - F1M2; No sorties.

== Other Special Attack Unit ==
=== Jinmu Special Attack Group ===
- Jinmu Special Attack Group (神武特別攻撃隊,, Jinmu Tokubetsu Kōgekitai)
  - Original unit; 1st Air Fleet, 1st Carrier Division (Aircraft carrier Unryū and Amagi)
    - Use for the Operation Jinmu No. 1 (第一次神武作戦,, Dai 1 Ji Jinmu Sakusen) at first. No sorties, all planes were incorporated to each Kamikaze Special Attack Group "Kongō Unit".
- No name unit
  - Original unit; 1st Carrier Division (Aircraft carrier Katsuragi)
    - Use for the Operation Jinmu No. 2 (第二次神武作戦,, Dai 2 Ji Jinmu Sakusen) at first, scrapped plan in early 1945.

=== Others ===
- 501st Attack Squadron Special Attack Unit (攻撃第五〇一飛行隊特別攻撃隊,, Kōgeki Dai 501 Hikōtai Tokubetsu Kōgekitai)
  - Original unit; 762nd NAG (501st AS), Army 7th Flying Regiment
    - 6 January 1945; 5× P1Y1, 6× G4M, 4× Ki-67 I (attack); U.S. carrier task force east off Taiwan.
- 2nd Fleet Reconnaissance seaplane Unit (第二艦隊水偵隊,, Dai 2 Kantai Suitei-tai)
  - Original unit; 2nd Fleet (Battleship Yamato and cruiser Yahagi)
  - 3× E13A (attack); Allies ship off Okinawa. No sorties, because the Yamato and the Yahagi had been sunk.
- Kasumigaura Naval Air Group, Fighter Special Attack Unit (霞ヶ浦航空隊 戦闘機特別攻撃隊,, Kasumigaura Kōkūtai, Sentōki Tokubetsu Kōgekitai)
  - Original unit; Kasumigaura NAG
    - 20× A6M2-K; No sorties.

== See also ==
- List of Imperial Japanese Army air-to-surface special attack units

== Bibliography ==
- Kazuhiko Osuo, Kōjinsha, Tōkyō, Japan.
  - Kamikaze, 2005 ISBN 4-7698-1226-4.
  - Shinbu, 2005, ISBN 4-7698-1227-2.
- Atene Shobō, Tōkyō, Japan.
  - Detailed battle report of Combined Fleet, Author: each unit of the Imperial Japanese Navy, reprinted in 1995, ISBN 4-87152-020-X.
    - Vol. 10 Land based air units (1).
    - Vol. 11 Land Based air units (2).
    - Vol. 17 Special attack units (1).
    - Vol. 18 Special attack units (2).
  - Navy battle record of special attack units, Author: each air unit of the Imperial Japanese Navy, reprinted in 2001, ISBN 4-87152-220-2.
- Famous Airplanes of the World, Bunrin-Dō Co., Ltd., Tōkyō, Japan.
  - No. 17 Army Type 3 Fighter "Hien", 1989, ISBN 978-4-89319-014-7.
  - Special Edition Vol. 1 Navy Bomber "Ginga" [Frances], 2000, ISBN 4-89319-081-4.
  - And other each volume.
- Model Art, Model Art Co. Ltd., Tōkyō, Japan.
  - No. 416, Special issue Medaled Pilots of Japanese Air Force in World War II, 1993.
  - No. 439, Special issue Heroes of the Imperial Japanese Navy Air Force in 1937–1945, 1994.
  - No. 451, Special issue Imperial Japanese Army Air Force Suicide Attack Unit, 1995.
  - No. 458, Special issue Imperial Japanese Navy Air Force Suicide Attack Unit "Kamikaze", 1995.
  - And other each volume.
- Ushio Shobō (Ushioshobokojinsha Co., Ltd.), Tōkyō, Japan.
  - Monthly The Maru No. 755, 2009.
  - The Maru Special No. 108, Kamikaze Special Attack Forces, 1986.
  - The Maru Mechanic No. 1, Shiden Kai", 1976.
  - And other each volume.
- Navy, Seibunsha K.K., Tōkyō, Japan.
  - Vol. 1, Dawning of the Navy, 1981.
  - Vol. 5, Pacific War #1, 1981.
  - Vol. 6, Pacific War #2, 1981.
  - Vol. 13, Naval Aviation, Naval Air Group and Aircraft, 1981.
- Japan Center for Asian Historical Records (http://www.jacar.go.jp/english/index.html), National Archives of Japan, Tokyo, Japan.
  - Reference code: C08051618300, Tactical operation records from April to May 1945, Flying Squad, Takuma Air Unit.
  - And other each record.
