= Insular Japonic languages =

Branch of the Japonic languages

Insular Japonic
- Japonic-Ryukyu, Japonic proper
- Geographic distribution: Japan, Taiwan (Yilan) and hypothetically formerly South Korea (Jeju Island)
- Linguistic classification: Japonic: Insular Japonic
- Subdivisions: Japanese; Ryukyuan; Hachijō; ?Tamna †

Language codes
- ISO 639-3: None (mis)
- Glottolog: None
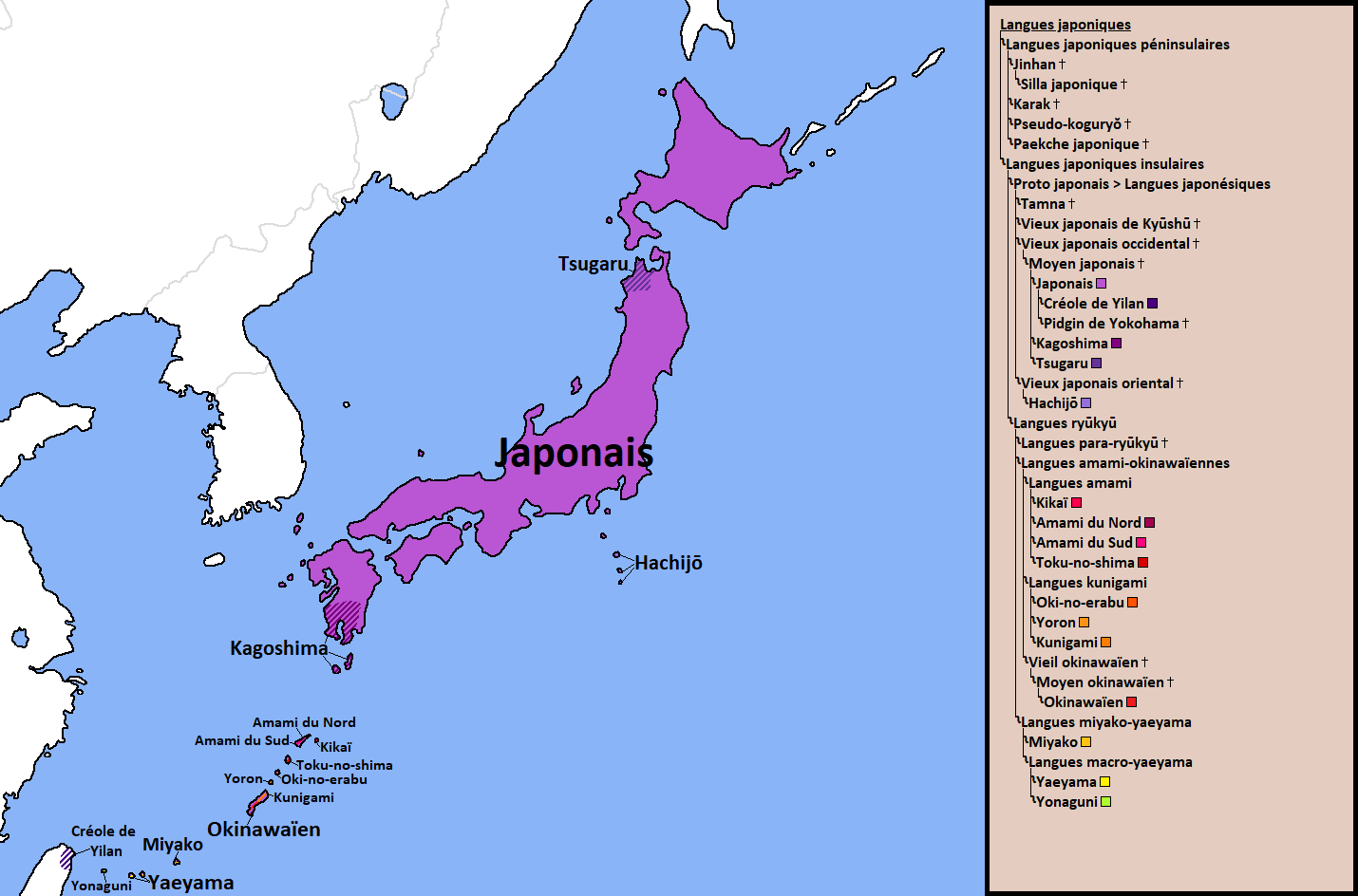
- Map of the modern Japonic languages, including Insular Japonic languages.

The Insular Japonic languages or Japonic-Ryukyu languages are a subdivision of the Japonic languages, as opposed to the hypothetical Peninsular Japonic languages formerly spoken in central and southern Korea. This grouping, originally proposed by Vovin, has been taken up several times subsequently.

== History ==
Currently, most scholars agree that the Japonic languages were brought to the Japanese archipelago between the 7th and 3rd centuries BC by wet rice farmers of the Yayoi culture from northern Kyushu, replacing the indigenous Jōmon people. Toponyms indicate that the Ainu language were formerly spoken in eastern Japan. Later, Japonic speakers settled on the Ryukyu Islands.

Linguistically, there is disagreement over the location and date of separation from the continental branch. Martine Robbeets argues that the two branches of the "Japonic" (Japonic) family split when their speakers moved from Shandong around 1500 BC to central and southern Korea. According to her, the Insular Japonic languages entered the archipelago around 700 BC, with some remaining in the southern Mahan and Byeonhan confederations. This theory has little support. Vovin and Whitman instead argue that the Insular Japonic languages split from the Peninsular Japonic languages upon arriving in Kyūshū between 1000 and 800 BC.

There is also disagreement regarding the separation of Old Japanese and the Ryukyu languages. One theory suggests that when taking into account innovations in Old Japanese not shared with the Ryukyu languages, the two branches must have separated before the 7th century, with the Ryukyus migrating from southern Kyushu to the Ryukyus with the expansion of the Gusuku culture around the 10th–11th century. Old Japanese is thought to have emerged during the Nara period. Robbeets proposes a similar theory, but places the separation date in the 1st century BC. Boer proposes that the Ryukyu languages are descended from the Kyushuan dialect of Old Japanese. One theory also suggests that Ryukyus remained in Kyushu until the 12th century.

== Internal classification ==
The relationship between Japanese and the Ryukyu languages was established in the 19th century by Basil Hall Chamberlain in his comparison of Okinawan and Japanese.

=== Standard classification ===
This classification below is the most widely used. Vovin classifies the Tamna language as part of the Insular Japonic branch. Hachijō, spoken in the Southern Izu Islands and formerly in the Daitō Islands iss sometimes considered a separate language due to its divergence from modern Japanese. Robbeets (2020) treats the Fukuoka and Kagoshima dialects as independent languages. Dialects are indicated in italics.

- Insular Japonic Languages
  - Old Japanese †
    - Tamna †
    - Old Kyushu Japanese †
      - Fukuoka
      - Kagoshima
    - Old Western Japanese †
      - Japanese
        - Yilan Creole Japanese
        - Japanese dialects
          - Kyushu dialects
            - Satsuma
            - Hichiku
              - Hakata
              - Tsushima
            - Hōnichi
          - Western Japanese dialects
            - Chūgoku
              - Hiroshima
              - Okayama
            - Umpaku
            - Shikoku
            - Kansai
            - Hokuriku
          - Eastern Japanese dialects
            - Izu
            - Kantō-echigo
              - Kantō
                - West Kantō
                  - Okinawan Japanese
                  - Amani
                  - Interior Hokkaido
                  - Standard Japanese
                - East Kantō
              - Echigo
            - Tōkai–Tōsan
              - Gifu–Aichi
                - Nagoya
              - Nagano–Yamanashi–Shizuoka
            - Tōhoku
              - Southern Tōhoku
                - Yamagata
              - Northern Tōhoku
                - Tsugaru
              - Coastal Hokkaido
    - Eastern Old Japanese †
      - Hachijō
  - Ryukyuan
    - Northern Ryukyuan
      - Amami
        - Amami Ōshima
          - Naze
          - Sani
        - Southern Amami Ōshima
        - Kikai
          - Onotsu
        - Tokunoshima
          - Kametsu
      - Kunigami
        - Yoron
        - Kunigami
          - Nago
        - Oki-no-Erabu
          - Western Oki-no-Erabu
          - Eastern Oki-no-Erabu
      - Okinawan
        - Kudaka
        - Naha
        - Shuri
        - Torishima
    - Southern Ryukyuan
      - Miyakoan
        - Miyako Island
          - Kurima
          - Miyako-jima
          - Ogami
        - Ikema-Irabu
          - Ikema-jima
          - Irabu-jima
        - Tarama-Minna
      - Macro-Yaeyama
        - Yaeyama
          - Hateruma
          - Hatoma
          - Ishigaki
          - Kabira
          - Kohama
          - Kuroshima
          - Shiraho
          - Sonai
          - Taketomi
        - Yonaguni

=== Alternative classification ===
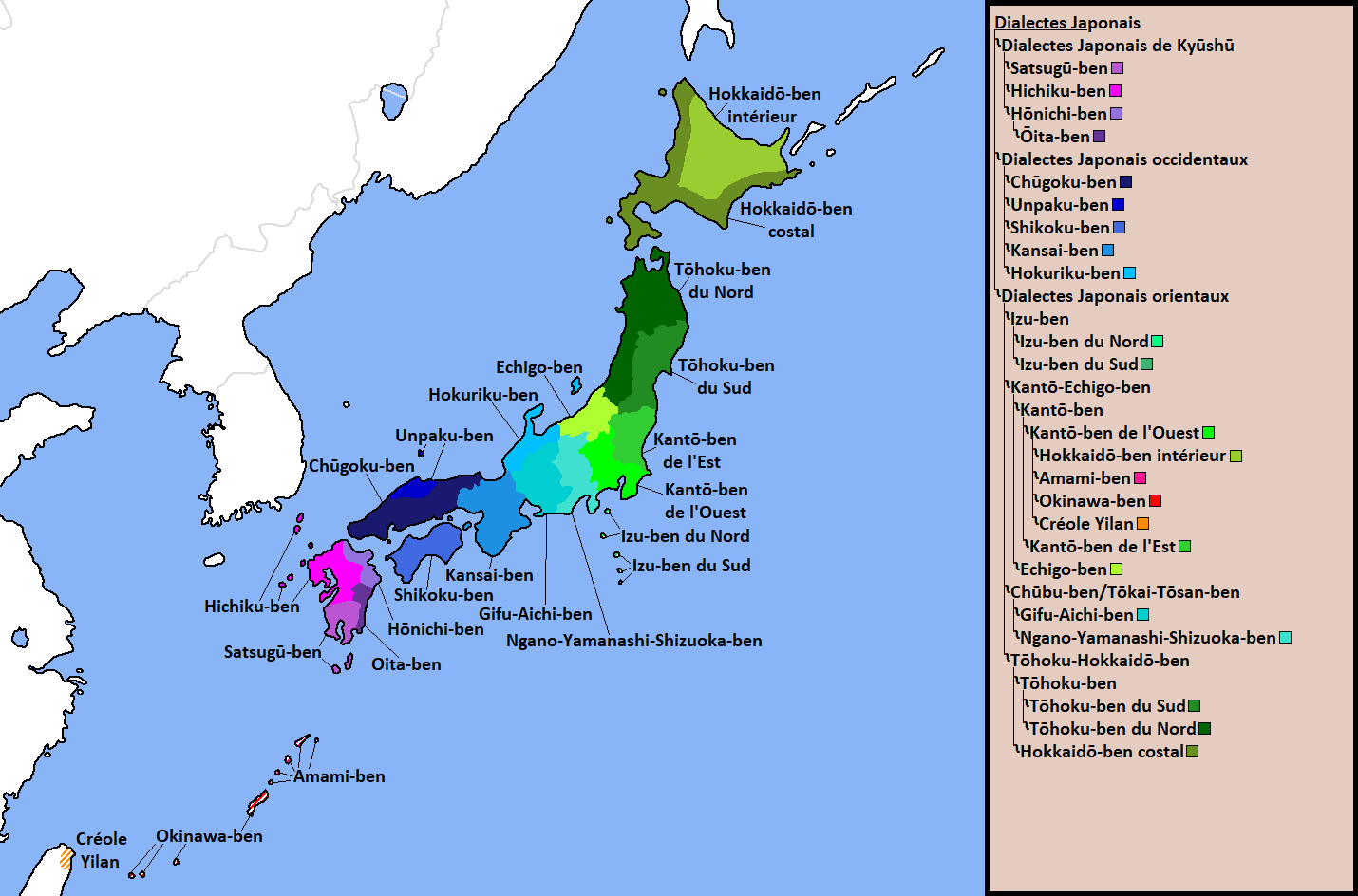
Map of the Japanese dialects.

Another classification based on pitch accents has been proposed. According to this, Japanese is paraphyletic within Insular Japonic.

- Insular Japonic Languages
  - Old Japanese
    - Izu
      - Hachijo/South Izu
      - North Izu
    - Kanto-Echigo
      - Kanto
      - Echigo
    - Nagano-Yamanashi-Shizuoka
  - Old Central Japanese
    - Ishikawa-Toyama
    - Gifu-Aichi
    - Kinki-Totsukawa
    - Shikoku
    - Chūgoku
  - Izumo-Tohoku
    - Conservative Izumo-Tohoku
      - Shimokita/Eastern Iwate
      - Peripheral Izumo
    - Innovative Izumo-Tohoku
      - Tohoku
      - Central Izumo
  - Kyushu-Ryukyu
    - Northeastern Kyushu
    - Southeastern Kyushu
    - Southwestern Kyushu-Ryukyu
      - Western Kyushu
      - South Kyushu-Ryukyu
        - South Kyushu
        - Ryukyuan

== Japanese–Ryūkyū lexical comparison ==
The first ten numbers.

English	Insular Proto-Japonic	Old Japanese	Japanese (Kun'yomi)	Hachijō	Proto-Ryukyuan	Okinawan	Miyakoan
one	*pitə	pitötu	hito(tsu)	tetsu	*pito	tiːtɕi	pi̥tiitsɿ
two	*puta	putatu	futa(tsu)	ɸu̥tatsu	*puta	taːtɕi	fu̥taatsɿ
three	*mi(t)	mitu	mi(ttsu)	mittsu	*mi	miːtɕi	miitsɿ
four	*jə	yötu	yon(tsu)	jottsu	*yo	juːtɕi	juutsɿ
five	*itu, *etu	itutu	itsu(tsu)	itsutsu	*etu	itɕitɕi	itsɿtsɿ
six	*mu(t)	mutu	mu(tsu)	muttsu	*mu	muːtɕi	mmtsɿ
seven	*nana	nanatu	nana(tsu)	nanatsu	*nana	nanatɕiː	nanatsɿ
eight	*ja	yatu	ya(tsu)	jattsu	*ya	jaːtɕi	jaatsɿ
nine	*kəkənə	kökönötu	kokono(tsu)	kokonotsu	*kokono	kukunutɕi	ku̥kunutsɿ
ten	*təwə	tö	tō	tou	*towa	tuː	tuu
