= Kunigami dialect =

Kunigami dialect may refer to:

- Eastern Okinoerabu spoken in the community of Kunigami
- Kunigami language

== See also ==
- Ryukyuan languages
- Northern Ryukyuan languages
