= Okinawan Japanese =

Regional variant of the Japanese language

- Native to: Japan
- Region: Okinawa Islands
- Ethnicity: Okinawans
- Native speakers: (undated figure of 1,000,000+)
- Language family: Japonic: Japanese; Eastern Japanese; Kantō; Western; Tokyo; Okinawan Japanese
- Writing system: Japanese writing system

Language codes
- ISO 639-3: –
- IETF: ja-u-sd-jp47

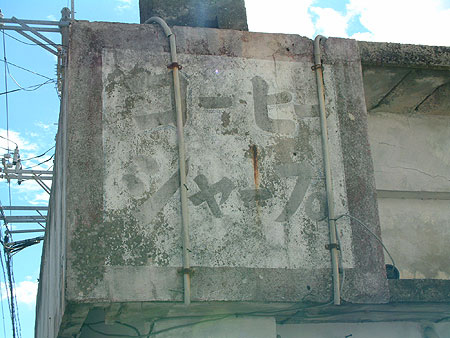
An example of Okinawan Japanese Koohii shaapu, from English "coffee shop", instead of Koohii shoppu in standard Japanese

Okinawan Japanese (ウチナーヤマトゥグチ, 沖縄大和口, Uchinaa Yamatu-guchi) is the Japanese language as spoken by the people of Okinawa Islands. The name Uchinaa Yamatu-guchi is composed of Uchinaa meaning "Okinawa", Yamatu referring to mainland Japan, and the suffix -guchi approximately meaning "language". Okinawan Japanese's pronunciation and words are influenced by the Northern Ryukyuan Okinawan and Kunigami languages spoken on the islands. However, the amount of influence Ryukyuan has on the Japanese spoken by Okinawans varies by family and age, as well as by region. Because of the many US military bases found in Okinawa, Okinawan Japanese has incorporated some English loanwords. Okinawan Japanese is a dialect of Japanese, unlike the Okinawan and Kunigami languages. Standard Japanese is used in formal settings while Ryukyuan languages and Okinawan Japanese are used in informal settings.

== History ==
In the Okinawa Islands, many learners of Japanese spoke it with a substrate from the Okinawan languages, causing a distinct variety of Japanese to form. This was a result of the language shift the Ryukyu Islands went through in the 20th century. The Ryukyuan languages were once widely spoken throughout the Ryukyu Islands, but saw a decline in speakers as a result of assimilation policies during much of pre-WW2 Japan. In 1907, the Japanese government passed the "Ordinance to Regulate Dialects" to ban the teaching of Ryukyuan in schools. Then, in 1939, the Japanese government made it compulsory for government offices and institutions in Okinawa to use standard Japanese. This event caused the Ryukyuan people to experience a language shift towards Japanese. Many Ryukyuan-influenced Japanese dialects emerged from the post-war generations who learned Ryukyuan as a first language and Japanese as a second language.

== Differences from Standard Japanese ==
The Okinawan language shares about 70% of its lexicon with Standard Japanese, resulting in loaning of Okinawan words into Japanese speech. Okinawan Japanese has borrowed many words from Standard Japanese, some of which are used with slightly different meanings. For example, a number of verb inflections and words indicating aspect and mood are the same in Standard Japanese and Okinawan Japanese, but have different uses. Hazu means "due, scheduled, or supposed to occur", which indicates a high degree of probability in Standard Japanese. Yet in Okinawan Japanese it indicates a much lower degree of probability, more like "probably" or "may occur". In Standard Japanese, the auxiliaries mashou, you, and ou are combined with the particle ne after a verb and used to make a suggestion. An example is ikimashou ne (Let's go). In Okinawan Japanese, this would express a speaker's will. It would mean "I will go" instead.

Particles and demonstratives are another aspect of Okinawan Japanese grammar that differ from Japanese. The particle kara which means "from" or "since" in Japanese, means "as" or "because" in Okinawan Japanese. So, kara is used in Okinawan Japanese where wo or de is used in Japanese.

Some words have different meanings in Standard Japanese. For example, aruku means "go around" or "work" in Okinawan Japanese, but means "walk" in Standard. Korosu means "hit" in Okinawan Japanese and "kill" in Standard.

Many Okinawan youth use words borrowed from Japanese slang, such as metchaa (very) and dasadasa (country bumpkin).

== English borrowings ==
Okinawan Japanese has some loanwords from American English due to the United States administration after the Battle of Okinawa. Okinawan Japanese has English loanwords exclusive to it. Examples are paaraa (parlor), biichii paatii (beach party), and takoraisu (taco rice). One word combines the English word 'rich' with the Okinawan suffix -aa to create ricchaa (a rich person).

== See also ==
- Amami Japanese, the equivalent of Okinawan Japanese spoken in Amami Ōshima
- Okinawan language

== Bibliography ==
- Ōsumi, Midori (2001). "Language and identity in Okinawa today". In Mary Noguchi; Sandra Fotos (eds.). Studies in Japanese Bilingualism. Multilingual Matters Ltd. pp. 68–97. ISBN 978-1853594892.
- Gibo, Lucille (2013). 言語接触論から見たブラジル沖縄コロニア語 [Language Contact and Brazil-Okinawan Colonia]. Immigration Studies (Thesis) (in Japanese). Vol. 9. University of the Ryukyus. pp. 19–40. doi:10.24564/0002010102. hdl:20.500.12000/29154.
- Heinrich, Patrick (2004). "Language Planning and Language Ideology in the Ryūkyū Islands". Language Policy. 3 (2): 153–179. doi:10.1023/B:LPOL.0000036192.53709.fc.
- Heinrich, Patrick (2022). "Language communities of the Northern Ryukyus". Language Communities in Japan. pp. 43–50. doi:10.1093/oso/9780198856610.003.0004. hdl:10278/3741706. ISBN 978-0-19-885661-0.
- Matsuno, Yuko (2004). A study of Okinawan language shift and ideology (Thesis). hdl:10150/291630. ProQuest 305215031.
- Heinrich, Patrick; Ohara, Yumiko, eds. (2019). Routledge Handbook of Japanese Sociolinguistics. doi:10.4324/9781315213378. hdl:10278/3712529. ISBN 978-1-315-21337-8.
