= Amami Ōshima language =

Ryukyuan language spoken in Japan

Amami Ōshima
- Amami
- 島口/シマユムタ Shimayumuta
- Native to: Japan
- Region: Amami Ōshima and neighboring islands, Kagoshima Prefecture
- Native speakers: ca. 12,000 (2004)
- Language family: Japonic: Ryukyuan; Northern Ryukyuan; Amami; Amami Ōshima
- Writing system: Japanese

Language codes
- ISO 639-3: Either: ryn – Northern ams – Southern (Setouchi)
- Glottolog: oshi1235
- Tan in south: Southern Amami. Green, pink, and tan in north: Northern Amami. Each orange area indicates where people characterize the local dialect as being the same language as they speak.

The Amami language or languages (島口, シマユムタ, Shimayumuta), also known as Amami Ōshima or simply Ōshima ('Big Island'), is a Ryukyuan language spoken in the Amami Islands south of Kyūshū. The southern variety of the Setouchi township may be a distinct language more closely related to Okinawan than it is to northern Ōshima.

As Amami does not have recognition within Japan as a language, it is officially known as the Amami dialect (奄美方言, Amami Hōgen).

== Speakers ==
The number of native speakers is uncertain, but they are predominantly elderly. It is estimated that there are approximately 10,000 speakers of the Northern dialect and approximately 2,000 speakers of the Southern (Setouchi) dialect. The Japanese government, via the Ministry of Education, is implementing measures to protect these endangered languages.

== Classification ==
Linguists mostly agree on the validity of the Amami–Okinawan languages as a family. The subdivisions of Amami–Okinawan, however, remain a matter of scholarly debate, with two major hypotheses:

- In a two-branch hypothesis, posited by Nakasone (1961), Hirayama (1964) and Nakamoto (1990), among others, Amami–Okinawan divides into Amami and Okinawan, with the northern and southern varieties of Amami Ōshima both falling within the Amami branch.
- In a three-subdivision hypothesis, proposed by Uemura (1972) as one of several possible classifications and supported by Karimata (2000), Northern Amami Ōshima (perhaps together with Kikai) and Central/Southern Okinawa form two branches, while the intervening varieties – Southern Amami Ōshima (Setouchi), Kunigami, and the dialects/languages of the islands between – form a third branch. In this proposal, Amami Ōshima does not constitute a single language, and the northern and southern varieties are not even more closely related to each other than they are to other Ryukyuan languages.

The two-subdivision hypothesis is convenient for discussing the modern languages since the posited linguistic boundary corresponds to the centuries-old administrative boundary that today separates Kagoshima and Okinawa Prefectures. In addition, several isoglosses do group Northern and Southern Amami together. In Amami, word-medial /k/ is changed to /h/ or even dropped when it is surrounded by /a/, /e/ or /o/. This can rarely be observed in Okinawan. Japanese /-awa/ becomes /-oː/ in Amami and /-aː/ in Okinawan.

The three-subdivision hypothesis is more phylogenetically-oriented. A marked isogloss is the vowel systems. Japanese language /e/ corresponds to /ɨ/ in Northern Amami Ōshima while it was merged into /i/ in Southern Amami Ōshima through Okinawan.

The vowel system-based classification is not without complication. The northern three communities of Kikai Island share the seven-vowel system with Amami Ōshima and Tokunoshima to the south, while the rest of Kikai falls in with Okinoerabu and Yoron even further south. Based on other evidence, however, Karimata (2000) and Lawrence (2011) tentatively group Kikai dialects together.

== Dialects ==
Amami Ōshima can be divided into Northern Amami Ōshima and Southern Amami Ōshima despite conflicting patterns of isoglosses. The distribution of Southern Amami Ōshima roughly corresponds to Setouchi Town, including offshore islands. The rest of the main island speaks Northern Amami Ōshima.

Shibata et al. (1984) takes a lexicostatistic approach to subgrouping Northern Amami Ōshima dialects:

- East China Sea side
  - Akatana
  - Yamato Village
  - Uken Village
- Pacific Ocean side
  - Komi (Kominato)
  - Northern Sumiyō
  - Southern Sumiyō

In addition, Sani, a small community on a peninsula at the northern tip of the island, is known to have distinct phonology.

Based on phonetic and lexical evidence, Shibata et al. (1984) subdivide Southern Amami Ōshima into

- Higashi (Eastern) Magiri
- Nishi (Western) Magiri

reflecting the administrative divisions during the Edo period. While Uke Island belonged to the Nishi Magiri district, its dialect is closer to that of Higashi Magiri.

Southern Amami Ōshima contrasts with Northern Amami Ōshima in its final unreleased consonants. For example, "shrimp" is [ʔip] in Ōshama (Southern) and [ʔibi] in Tatsugō (Northern); "blade" is [katna] in Ōshama and [katana] in Tatsugō.

== Names ==
According to Osada Suma (1902–1998), the dialect of Yamatohama, Yamato Village of Amami Ōshima had yumuta /ˈjumuθa/ for 'language', shimayumuta /simaˈjumuθa/ for 'island language' (i.e. Amami Ōshima) and Yamatoguchi /ˈjamaθoɡuci/ for the language of mainland Japan (i.e. Japanese). Another term, shimaguchi /simaɡuci/, is absent from Osada's dictionary. According to Kurai Norio (b. 1923), a local historian from Amami Ōshima, shimaguchi contrasted with Yamatoguchi, while shimayumuta was associated with accentual and intonational differences among various shima (villages). Ebara Yoshimori (1905–1988), a folklorist from Naze, Amami Ōshima, conjectured that shimaguchi was of relatively recent origin, possibly made through analogy with Yamatoguchi. He thought that the dialect of one's home community was better referred to as shimayumuta.

== Phonology ==
=== Consonants ===
Historically, vowel-initial words acquired an epenthetic glottal stop. When *wo and *we later became /u/ and /i/ without an initial glottal stop, the glottal stop elsewhere became phonemic. When still later initial vowels were elided, an initial glottal stop merged with the following consonant, establishing a series of "glottalized" consonants. While the nasals are truly glottalized, the "glottalized" stops are merely tenuis [C˭], contrasting with the default aspirated stops [Cʰ].

Northern (Naze dialect)
Southern (Koniya dialect)

Consonant phonemes
		Bilabial	Alveolar	Post- alveolar	Palatal	Velar	Glottal
Nasal	plain	m	n				
Nasal	glottalized	mˀ	nˀ				
Plosive/ Affricate	aspirated	pʰ (Note: In the southern Shodon dialect (just off Kakeroma Island), *pʰ has become /ɸ/.)	tʰ	t͡ʃʰ		kʰ	
Plosive/ Affricate	tenuis	p˭	t˭	t͡ʃ˭		k˭	ʔ
Plosive/ Affricate	voiced	b	d			ɡ	
Fricative	voiceless		s				h
Fricative	voiced		(z) (Note: /z/ is only found in recent loans from Japanese.)				
Approximant					j	w	
Flap				ɾ			

==== Closed syllables ====
In the southern Shodon dialect, the consonants /p t tɕ k ɕ ɾ m n/ occur at the end of a word or syllable, as in /k˭upʰ/ 'neck', /sakʰɾa/ 'cherry blossom' and /t˭ɨɾɡjo/ 'well'. Other dialects are similar. Final consonants are usually the result of eliding high front vowels. Elision is partly conditioned by pitch accent. In Shodon dialect, for example, the noun with accent classes 2.1 and 2.2 are realized as [mɨtʰ] (water, 2.1) and [ʔiʃ] (stone, 2.2) while 2.3-5 nouns retain final vowels, e.g. [mimiː] (ear, 2.3), [haɾiː] (needle, 2.4) and [haɾuː] (spring, 2.5).

=== Vowels ===
There are seven distinct vowel qualities in Amami Ōshima, in addition to a phonemic distinction between long and short vowels and in some dialects oral and nasal vowels.

Ōshima vowel qualities
	Front	Central	Back
High	i	ɨ	u
Mid	e	ɘ	o
Low		a	

/ɨ/ and /ɘ/ are generally transcribed "ï" and "ë" in the literature.

/ɨ/ derives from *e and merges with /i/ after alveolar consonants. /ɘ/ mostly derives from a merger of *ae and *ai, and so is usually long. In several northern dialects, the nasal vowels /ã õ ɨ̃ ɘ̃/ developed from the loss of a word-medial /m/:

*pama > pʰaã 'shore', *jome > juw̃ɨ̃ 'bride', *kimo > k˭joõ 'liver', *ɕima > ɕoõ 'island', *mimidzu > mɘɘ̃dza 'earthworm'

Kasarisani dialect has 11 oral and nasal vowels, while Sani dialect adds long vowels for a total of 18, the largest inventory of any Ryukyuan languages.

== Resources ==
- Amami hōgen bunrui jiten (1977–1980) by Osada Suma, Suyama Nahoko and Fujii Misako. A dictionary for the dialect of Osada's home community, Yamatohama, Yamato Village of Amami Ōshima (part of Northern Amami Ōshima). Its phonemic romanization was designed by Hattori Shirō. He also supervised the early compilation process. This dictionary is partially available online as the Amami Dialect Dictionary.
- The Phonetics and Vocabulary of the Sani Dialect (Amami Oshima Island, Ryukyuan language group)' (2003) by Karimata Shigehisa. Sani is known as a language island.
- Kikaijima hōgen-shū (1977 [1941]) by Iwakura Ichirō. A dictionary for the author's home community, Aden, and a couple of other southern communities on Kikai Island of the Amami Islands (its membership disputed). Can also be accessed at the NDL Digital Collections here.
- Samuel E. Martin, 1970. Shodon: A Dialect of the Northern Ryukyus
- Shigehisa Karimata, 1995–1996. The Phonemes of the Shodon dialect in Amami-Oshima
