= Kikai =

Kikai is a Japanese name and may refer to:

== Places in Japan ==
- Kikai Caldera, Ōsumi Islands of Kagoshima Prefecture
- Kikaijima, one the Amami Islands
- Kikai, Kagoshima, a town on Kikaijima, Kagoshima Prefecture

== Other uses ==
- Kikai language, a dialect cluster spoken on Kikai Island, Japan
- Hiroh Kikai (1945–2020), Japanese photographer
