= Ryukyuan languages =

Subfamily of the Japonic languages

Ryukyuan
- Lewchewan, Luchuan
- Geographic distribution: Ryukyu Islands (Okinawa Prefecture, Amami Islands of Kagoshima Prefecture)
- Ethnicity: Ryukyuan
- Linguistic classification: Japonic: Insular; Ryukyuan
- Proto-language: Proto-Ryukyuan
- Subdivisions: Northern Ryukyuan; Southern Ryukyuan

Language codes
- Glottolog: ryuk1243
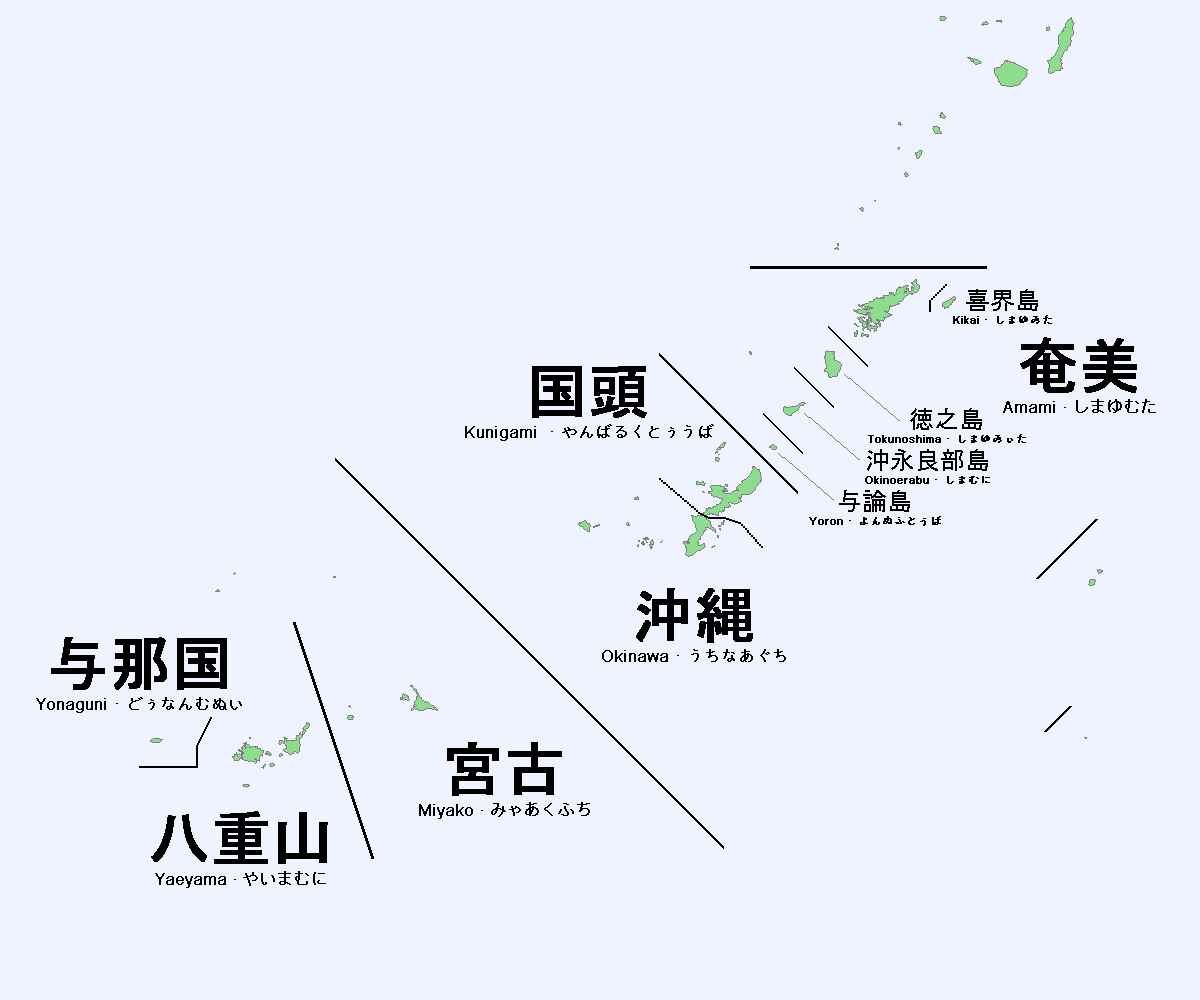
- Map of Ryukyuan languages

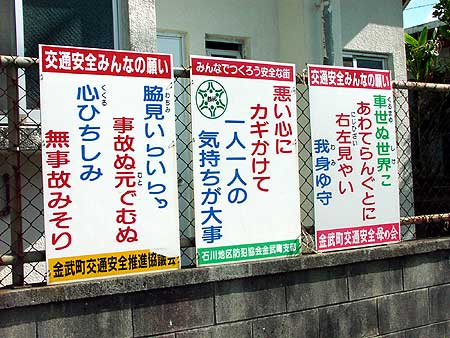
Traffic safety slogan signs in Kin, Okinawa, written in Japanese (center) and Okinawan (left and right)

The Ryukyuan languages (琉球語派, Ryūkyū-goha; also 琉球諸語, Ryūkyū-shogo or 島言葉 in Ryukyuan, Shima kotoba, literally "Island Speech"), also Lewchewan or Luchuan (/luː.ˈtʃuː.ən/), are the indigenous languages of the Ryukyu Islands, the southernmost part of the Japanese archipelago. Along with the Japanese language and the Hachijō language, they make up the Japonic language family.

Just as among Japanese dialects, which can have low mutual intelligibility, the Ryukyuan and mainland Japanese languages are not mutually intelligible. It is not known how many speakers of these languages remain, but language shift toward the use of Standard Japanese and dialects like Okinawan Japanese has resulted in these languages becoming endangered; UNESCO labels four of the languages "definitely endangered" and two others "severely endangered".

== Overview ==
Phonologically, the Ryukyuan languages have some cross-linguistically unusual features. Southern Ryukyuan languages have a number of syllabic consonants, including unvoiced syllabic fricatives (e.g. Ōgami Miyako /kss/ [ksː] 'breast'). Glottalized consonants are common (e.g. Yuwan Amami /ʔma/ [ˀma] "horse"). Some Ryukyuan languages have a central close vowel rather than the more common front and back close vowels [i] and [u], e.g. Yuwan Amami /kɨɨ/ "tree". Ikema Miyako has a voiceless nasal phoneme /n̥/. Many Ryukyuan languages have contrastive pitch accent.

Ryukyuan languages are generally subject–object–verb (SOV) order, dependent-marking, modifier-head, nominative-accusative languages. Adjectives are generally bound morphemes, occurring either with noun compounding or using verbalization. Many Ryukyuan languages mark both nominatives and genitives with the same marker. This marker has the unusual feature of changing form depending on an animacy hierarchy. The Ryukyuan languages have topic and focus markers, which may take different forms depending on the sentential context. Ryukyuan also preserves a special verbal inflection for clauses with focus markers—this unusual feature was also found in Old Japanese, but lost in Modern Japanese.

== Classification and varieties ==
The Ryukyuan languages belong to the Japonic language family, related to the Japanese language. The Ryukyuan languages are not mutually intelligible with Japanese—indeed, Ryukyuan languages are largely not mutually intelligible with each other—and thus are usually considered separate languages. However, for socio-political and ideological reasons, they have often been classified within Japan as dialects of Japanese. Since the beginning of World War II, most mainland Japanese have regarded the Ryukyuan languages as a dialect or group of dialects of Japanese.

The Okinawan language is only 71% lexically similar to, or cognate with, standard Japanese. Even the southernmost Japanese dialect (Kagoshima dialect) is only 72% cognate with the northernmost Ryukyuan language (Amami). The Kagoshima dialect of Japanese, however, is 80% lexically similar to Standard Japanese. There is general agreement among linguistics experts that Ryukyuan varieties can be divided into six languages, conservatively, with dialects unique to islands within each group also sometimes considered languages.

A widely accepted hypothesis among linguists categorizes the Ryukyuan languages into two groups, Northern Ryukyuan (Amami–Okinawa) and Southern Ryukyuan (Miyako–Yaeyama). Many speakers of the Amami, Miyako, Yaeyama and Yonaguni languages may also be familiar with Okinawan since Okinawan has the most speakers and once acted as the regional standard. Speakers of Yonaguni are also likely to know the Yaeyama language due to its proximity. Since Amami, Miyako, Yaeyama, and Yonaguni are less urbanized than the Okinawan mainland, their languages are not declining as quickly as that of Okinawa proper, and some children continue to be brought up in these languages.

- Ryukyuan
  - Northern Ryukyuan languages
    - Amami
      - Kikai
      - Amami Ōshima
        - Northern
        - Southern
      - Tokunoshima
    - Kunigami
      - Okinoerabu
      - Yoron
      - Kunigami
    - Okinawan
  - Southern Ryukyuan languages
    - Miyakoan
      - Central Miyako
      - Irabu
      - Tarama
    - Yaeyama
    - Yonaguni

Language	Local name	Geographic distribution	Speakers	Standard dialect	ISO 639-3
Kikai	しまゆみた; Shimayumita	Kikaijima	13,000	Onotsu	kzg
Amami	島口 / シマユムタ; Shimayumuta	Amami Ōshima and surrounding minor islands	12,000	Setouchi (Southern), Naze (Northern)	ams, ryn
Tokunoshima	シマユミィタ; Shimayumiita	Tokunoshima	5,100	Kametsu, Tokunoshima	tkn
Okinoerabu	島ムニ; Shimamuni	Okinoerabujima	3,200	Kunigami	okn
Yoron	ユンヌフトゥバ; Yunnu Futuba	Yoronjima	950	Higashi Mugiya-ku, Yoron	yox
Kunigami	山原言葉 / ヤンバルクトゥーバ; Yanbaru Kutūba	Northern Okinawa Island (Yanbaru region), and surrounding minor islands	5,000	Nakijin, but the largest community is Nago	xug
Okinawan	沖縄口 / ウチナーグチ; Uchināguchi	Central and southern Okinawa Island and surrounding minor islands	228,000 native, 1,143,000 total speakers	Traditionally Shuri, modern Naha	ryu
Miyako	宮古口 / ミャークフツ; Myākufutsu 島口 / スマフツ; Sumafutsu	Miyako Islands	50,000	Hirara	mvi
Yaeyama	八重山物言 / ヤイマムニ; Yaimamuni	Yaeyama Islands (except Yonaguni)	47,600	Ishigaki	rys
Yonaguni	与那国物言 / ドゥナンムヌイ; Dunan Munui	Yonaguni Island	400	Yonaguni	yoi

Each Ryukyuan language is generally unintelligible to others in the same family. There is wide diversity among them. For example, Yonaguni has only three vowels, whereas varieties of Amami may have up to seven, excluding length distinctions. The table below illustrates the different phrases used in each language for "thank you" and "welcome", with standard Japanese provided for comparison.

Language	Thank you	Welcome
Standard Japanese	Arigatō gozaimasu	Yōkoso
Amami	Arigatesama ryōta Arigassama ryōta	Imōre
Kunigami (Okinoerabu)	Mihediro	Ugamiyabura; Menshōri
Okinawan	Nifēdēbiru	Mensōrē
Miyako	Tandigātandi; Maifuka	Nmyāchi
Yaeyama	Mīfaiyū; Fukōrasān	Ōritōri
Yonaguni	Fugarasa	Wāri

"Welcome" signs in each language
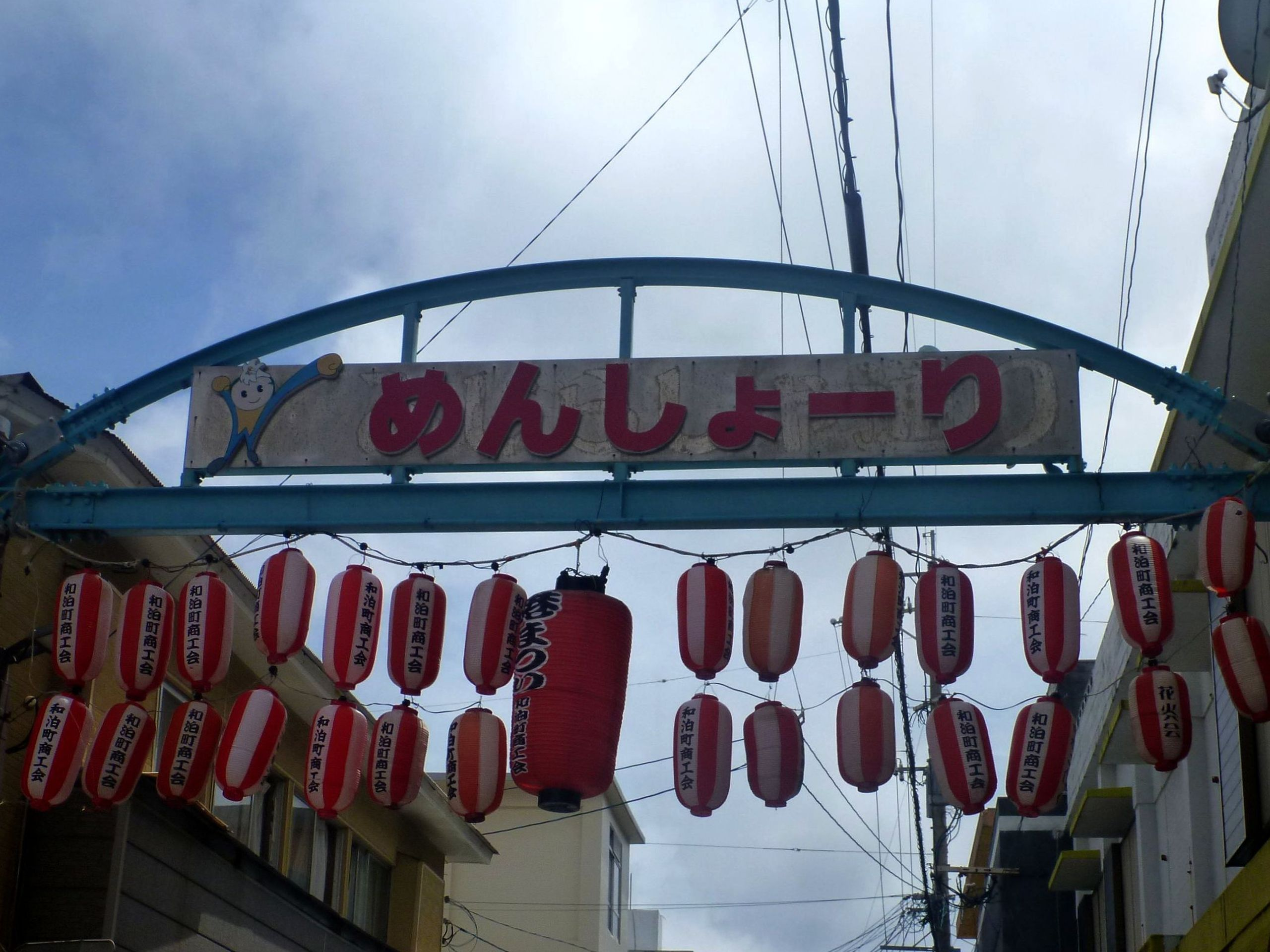
Menshōri (めんしょーり), Kunigami (Okinoerabu)

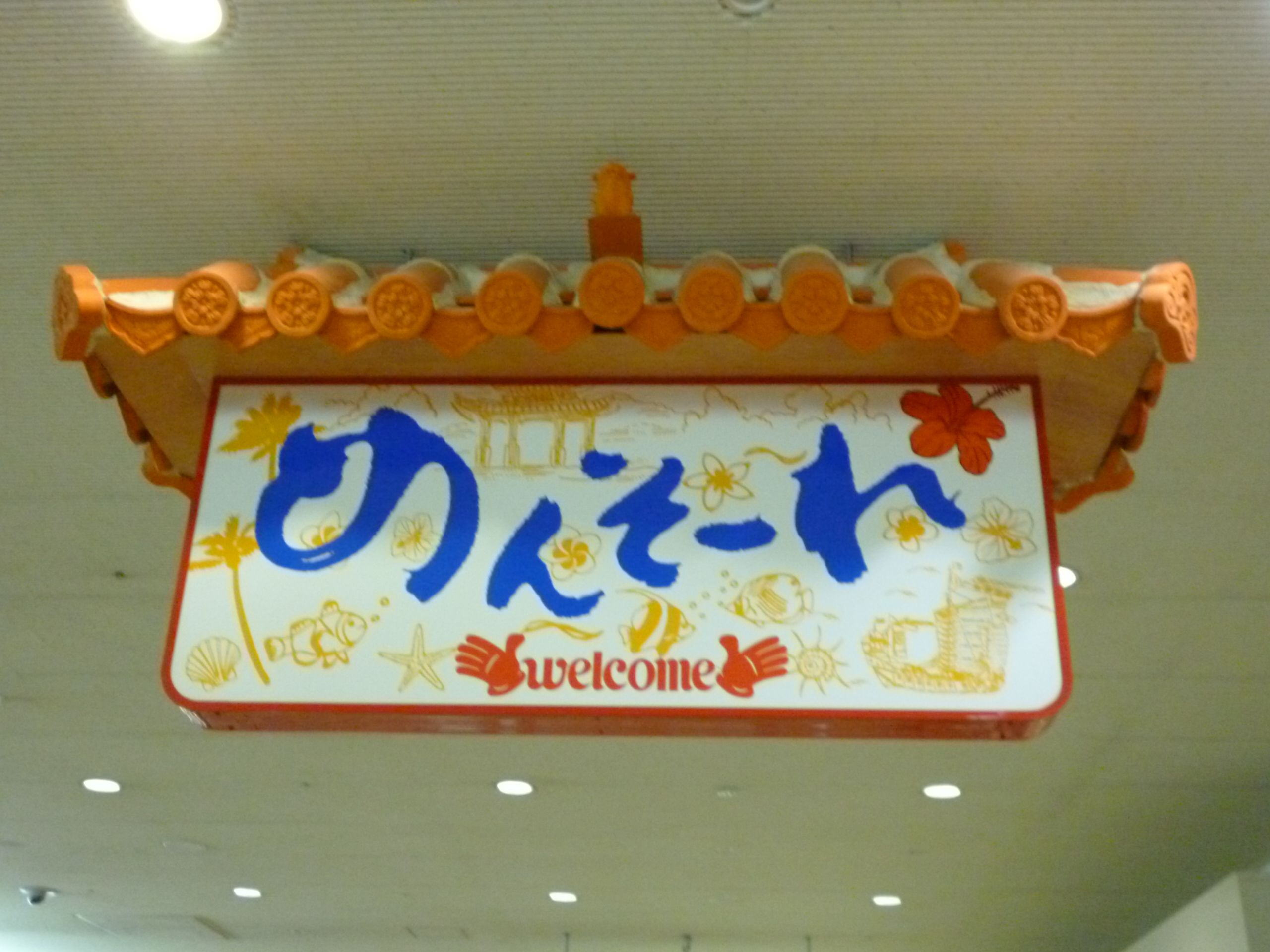
Mensōre (めんそーれ), Okinawan

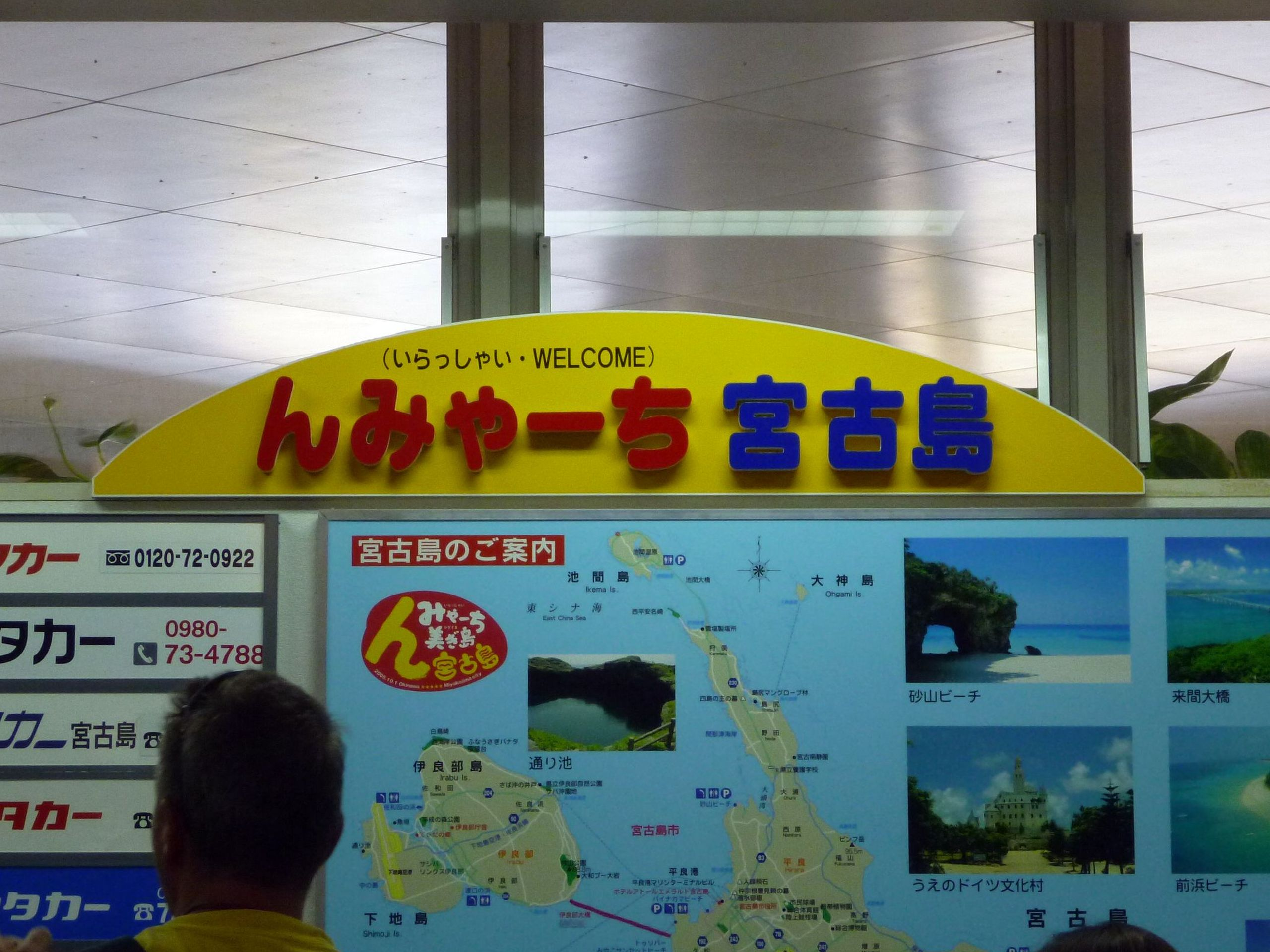
Nmyāchi (んみゃーち), Miyako

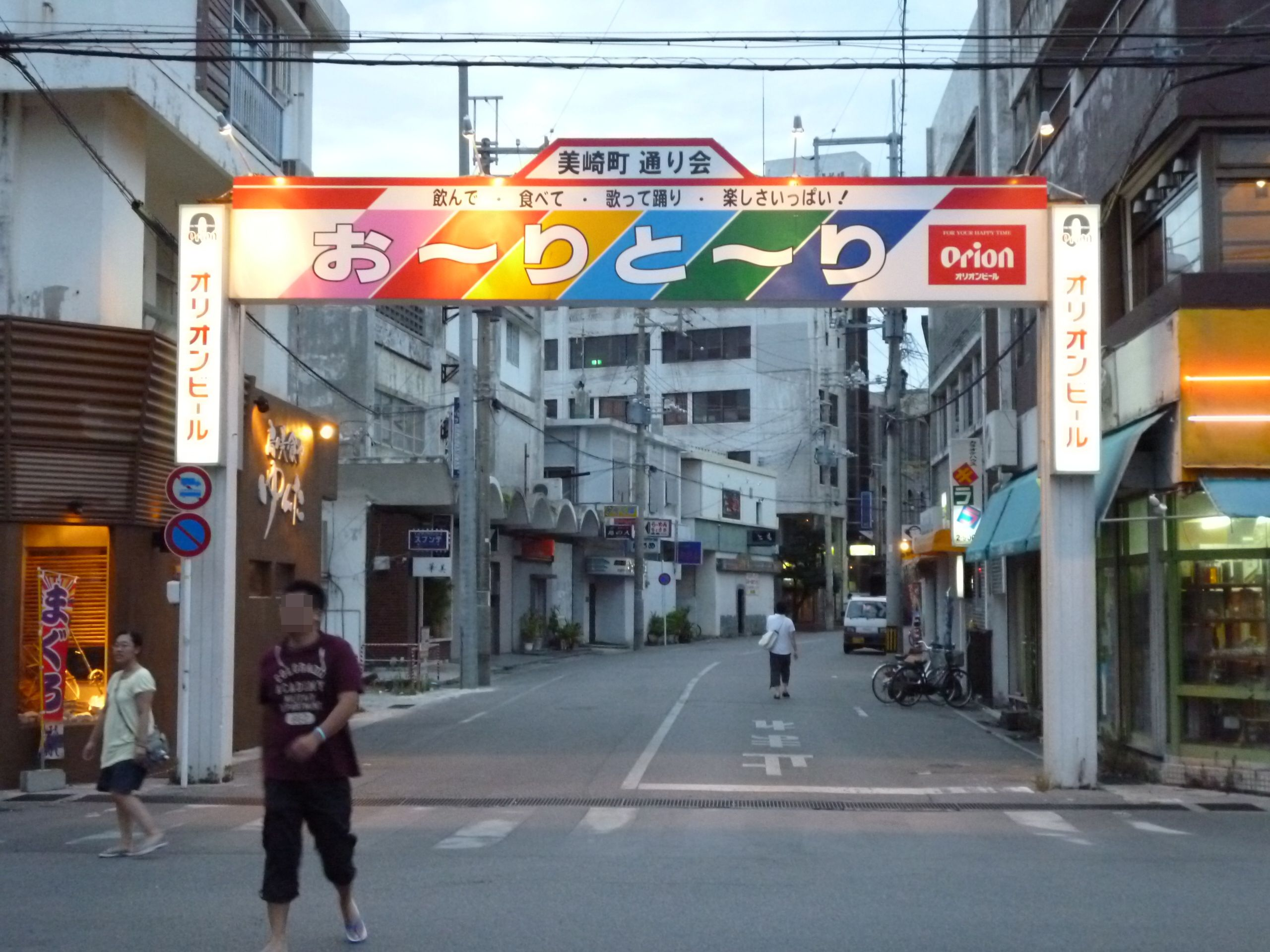
Ōritōri (おーりとーり), Yaeyama

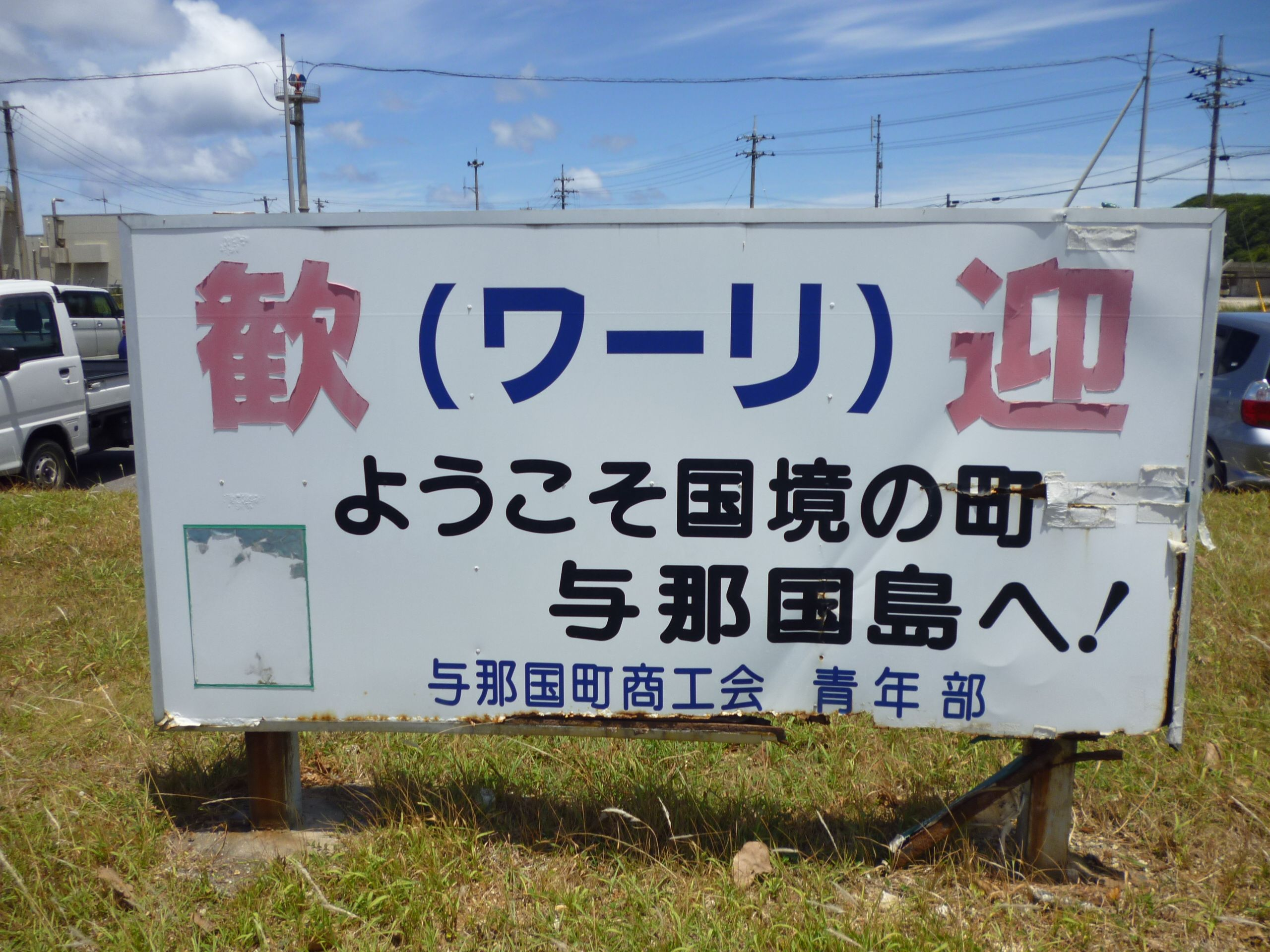
Wāri (ワーリ), Yonaguni

== Status ==
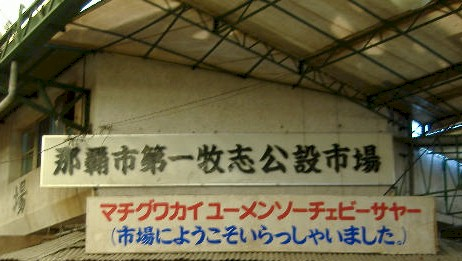
A market sign in Naha, written in Okinawan (red) and Japanese (blue)

There is no census data for the Ryukyuan languages, and the number of speakers is unknown. As of 2005, the total population of the Ryukyu region was 1,452,288, but fluent speakers are restricted to the older generation, generally in their 50s or older, and thus the true number of Ryukyuan speakers is likely much lower.

The six Ryukyuan languages are listed in the UNESCO Atlas of the World's Languages in Danger. UNESCO said all Ryukyuan languages are on course for extinction by 2050.

Starting in the 1890s, the Japanese government began to suppress the Ryukyuan languages as part of their policy of forced assimilation in the islands.

Children being raised in the Ryukyuan languages are becoming increasingly rare throughout the islands, and usually occurs only when the children are living with their grandparents. The Ryukyuan languages are still used in traditional cultural activities, such as folk music, folk dance, poem and folk plays. There has also been a radio news program in the Naha dialect since 1960.

Circa 2007, in Okinawa, people under the age of 40 have little proficiency in the native Okinawan language. A new mixed language, based on Japanese and Okinawan, has developed, known as "Okinawan Japanese". Although it has been largely ignored by linguists and language activists, this is the language of choice among the younger generation.

Similarly, the common language now used in everyday conversations in Amami Ōshima is not the traditional Amami language, but rather a regional variation of Amami-accented Japanese, known as Amami Japanese. It is locally known as トン普通語 (Ton Futsūgo, literally meaning "potato [i.e. rustic] common language").

To try to preserve the language, the Okinawan Prefectural government proclaimed on March 31, 2006, that September 18 would be commemorated as Shimakutuba no Hi "Island Languages Day" (しまくとぅばの日), as the day's numerals in goroawase spell out ku (9), tu (10), ba (8); kutuba is one of the few words common throughout the Ryukyuan languages meaning "word" or "language" (a cognate of the Japanese word kotoba (言葉, "word")). A similar commemoration is held in the Amami region on February 18 beginning in 2007, proclaimed as Hōgen no Hi (方言の日, "Dialect Day") by Ōshima Subprefecture in Kagoshima Prefecture. Each island has its own name for the event:

- Amami Ōshima: Shimayumuta no Hi (シマユムタの日) or Shimakutuba no Hi (シマクトゥバの日) (also written 島口の日)
- Kikaijima: Shimayumita no Hi (シマユミタの日)
- Tokunoshima: Shimaguchi no Hi (シマグチ（島口）の日) or Shimayumiita no Hi (シマユミィタの日)
- Okinoerabujima: Shimamuni no Hi (島ムニの日)
- Yoronjima: Yunnufutuba no Hi (ユンヌフトゥバの日).

Yoronjima's fu (2) tu (10) ba (8) is the goroawase source of the February 18 date, much like with Okinawa Prefecture's use of kutuba.

== History ==
It is generally accepted that the Ryukyu Islands were populated by Proto-Japonic speakers in the first millennium, and since then relative isolation allowed the Ryukyuan languages to diverge significantly from the varieties of Proto-Japonic spoken in Mainland Japan, which would later be known as Old Japanese. However, the discoveries of the Pinza-Abu Cave Man, the Minatogawa Man, and the Yamashita Cave Man as well as the Shiraho Saonetabaru Cave Ruins suggest an earlier arrival to the island by modern humans. Some researchers suggest that the Ryukyuan languages are most likely to have evolved from a "pre-Proto-Japonic language" from the Korean peninsula. However, Ryukyuan may have already begun to diverge from Proto-Japonic before this migration, while its speakers still dwelt in the main islands of Japan. After this initial settlement, there was little contact between the main islands and the Ryukyu Islands for centuries, allowing Ryukyuan and Japanese to diverge as separate linguistic entities from each other. This situation lasted until the Kyushu-based Satsuma Domain conquered the Ryukyu Islands in the 17th century.

In 1846–1849 first Protestant missionary in Ryukyu Bernard Jean Bettelheim studied local languages, partially translated the Bible into them and published first grammar of Shuri Ryukyuan.

The Ryukyu Kingdom retained its autonomy until 1879, when it was annexed by Japan. The Japanese government adopted a policy of forced assimilation, appointing mainland Japanese to political posts and suppressing native culture and language. Students caught speaking the Ryukyuan languages were made to wear a dialect card (方言札 hōgen fuda), a method of public humiliation. (Note: This punishment was taken from the 19th French language policy of Vergonha, especially by Jules Ferry, where the regional languages such as Occitan (Provençal), Catalan, or Breton were suppressed in favor of French; see also Welsh Not, for a similar system in Wales. The same system was also used in other parts of Japan, such as the Tōhoku region.) Students who regularly wore the card would receive corporal punishment. In 1940, there was a political debate amongst Japanese leaders about whether or not to continue the oppression of the Ryukyuan languages, although the argument for assimilation prevailed. In the World War II era, speaking the Ryukyuan languages was officially illegal, although in practice the older generation was still monolingual. During the Battle of Okinawa, many Okinawans were labeled as spies and executed for speaking the Okinawan language. This policy of linguicide lasted into the post-war occupation of the Ryukyu Islands by the United States. As the American occupation forces generally promoted the reforming of a separate Ryukyuan culture, many Okinawan officials continued to strive for Japanification as a form of defiance.

Nowadays, in favor of multiculturalism, preserving Ryukyuan languages has become the policy of Okinawa Prefectural government, as well as the government of Kagoshima Prefecture's Ōshima Subprefecture. However, the situation is not very optimistic, since the vast majority of Okinawan children are now monolingual in Japanese.

== Geographic distribution ==
The Ryukyuan languages are spoken on the Ryukyu Islands, which comprise the southernmost part of the Japanese archipelago. There are four major island groups which make up the Ryukyu Islands: the Amami Islands, the Okinawa Islands, the Miyako Islands, and the Yaeyama Islands. The former is in the Kagoshima Prefecture, while the latter three are in the Okinawa Prefecture.

== Orthography ==
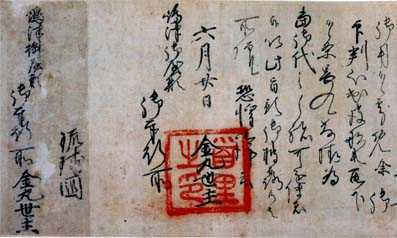
A letter from King Shō En to Shimazu oyakata (1471); an example of written Ryukyuan

Older Ryukyuan texts are often found on stone inscriptions. Tamaudun-no-Hinomon (玉陵の碑文 "Inscription of Tamaudun tomb") (1501), for example. Within the Ryukyu Kingdom, official texts were written in kanji and hiragana, derived from Japan. However, this was a sharp contrast from Japan at the time, where classical Chinese writing was mostly used for official texts, only using hiragana for informal ones. Classical Chinese writing was sometimes used in Ryukyu as well, read in kundoku (Ryukyuan) or in Chinese. In Ryukyu, katakana was hardly used.

Historically, official documents in Ryukyuan were primarily written in Japanese Epistolary style (候文) with Hentaigana. However, after the Satsuma invasion, Japanese culture was banned as part of the policy of exoticizing Ryukyu, and under the policy of Haneji Ōji Chōshū, documents within Ryukyu also began to be written in classical Chinese known as Kanbun while poetry and songs were often written in the Shuri dialect of Okinawan.

Chuzan-Dengon-Roku written in 1721 by a Chinese diplomat follows Iroha Order for Okinawan phonetic system. Iroha order is traditional phonetic system used in Japan.

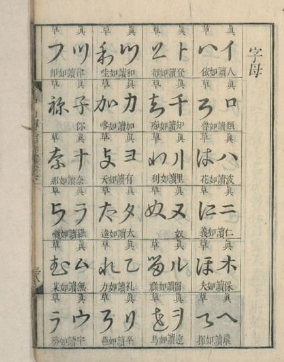
Chinese translation of Okinawan Script (Japanese Hiragana and Katakana）

Commoners did not learn kanji. Omoro Sōshi (1531–1623), a noted Ryukyuan song collection, was mainly written in hiragana. Other than hiragana, they also used Suzhou numerals (sūchūma すうちゅうま in Okinawan), derived from China. In Yonaguni in particular, there was a different writing system, the Kaidā glyphs (カイダー字 or カイダーディー). Under Japanese influence, all of those numerals became obsolete.

Nowadays, perceived as "dialects", Ryukyuan languages are not often written. When they are, Japanese characters are used in an ad hoc manner. There are no standard orthographies for the modern languages. Sounds not distinguished in the Japanese writing system, such as glottal stops, are not properly written. Sometimes local kun'yomi are given to kanji, such as agari (あがり "east") for 東, iri (いり "west") for 西, thus 西表 is Iriomote.

Okinawa Prefectural government set up the investigative commission for orthography of shimakutuba (しまくとぅば正書法検討委員会, Shimakutuba seishohō kentō iinkai) in 2018, and the commission proposed an unified spelling rule based on katakana for languages of Kunigami, Okinawa, Miyako, Yaeyama and Yonaguni on May 30, 2022.

== Literature ==
=== Omoro Sōshi ===
The Omoro Sōshi is a compilation of ancient poems and songs from Okinawa and the Amami Islands, collected into 22 volumes and written primarily in hiragana with some simple kanji. The Omoro Sōshi was first compiled in 1531.

More than 80% of the words used in Omoro are common with the Yamato language and were used in the Muromachi period. This usage of language Indicates that the people who carried Omoro poems were those who migrated south from Yamato to Okinawa in the late Heian to Muromachi periods.

== Phonology ==
Ryukyuan languages often share many phonological features with Japanese, including a voicing opposition for obstruents, CV(C) syllable structure, moraic rhythm, and pitch accent. However, many individual Ryukyuan languages diverge significantly from this pan-Japonic base. For instance, Ōgami does not have phonemic voicing in obstruents, allows CCVC syllables, and has unusual syllabic consonants such as /kff/ [kf̩ː] "make".

=== Consonants ===
The Northern Ryukyuan (Amami-Okinawa) languages are notable for having glottalic consonants. Phonemically these are analyzed of consisting of a cluster /ʔ/ + C, where the consonant /ʔ/ consists of its own mora. For instance, in the Amami dialect Yuwan the word /ʔma/ [ˀma] "horse" is bimoraic. Tsuken (Central Okinawan) restricts glottalization to glides and the vowels /a i/. Southern Ryukyuan mostly has little to no glottalization, with some exceptions (e.g. Yonaguni). For instance, the Irabu dialect of the Miyako language only allows glottalization with /t/ and /c/: /ttjaa/ [ˀtʲaː] "then", /ccir/ [ˀtɕiɭ] "pipe".

Southern Ryukyuan stands out in having a number of syllabic consonants. These consonants are contextually nucleic, becoming syllabic when not adjacent to a vowel. Examples:

Irabu Miyako:

- /nam/ [nam] "wave"
- /mna/ [mna] "shell"
- /mm/ [mː] "potato"
- /pžtu/ [ps̩tu] "man"
- /prrma/ [pɭːma] "daytime"

Ōgami Miyako

- /us/ [us] "cow"
- /ss/ [sː] "dust"
- /kss/ [ksː] "breast"

Ōgami even shows a three-way length distinction in fricatives, though across a syllable boundary:

- /fɑɑ/ [fɑː] "child"
- /f.fɑ/ [fːɑ] "grass"
- /ff.fɑ/ [fːːɑ] "comb", "top"

Ikema (a Miyako dialect) has a voiceless moraic nasal phoneme /n̥/, which always precedes another nasal onset and assimilates its place of articulation to the following nasal.

=== Vowels ===
Amami has high and mid central vowels. Yonaguni only has three contrasting vowels, /i/, /u/ and /a/.

=== Suprasegmentals ===
The Ryukyuan languages operate based on the mora. Most Ryukyuan languages require words to be at least bimoraic, thus for example in Hateruma the underlying noun root /si/ "hand" becomes /sii/ when it is an independent noun, though it remains as /si/ when attached to a clitic, e.g. /si=nu/. (Note: In fact, in Irabu Miyako lengthening occurs even before a clitic, thus underlying /ti/ "hand" becomes /tiː/ independently and /tiː=nu/ with attached clitic.) However, the syllable may still sometimes be relevant—for instance, the Ōgami topic marker takes a different form after open syllables with short vowels:

- "staff" /pɑu + =ɑ/ → /pɑu=iɑ/
- "vegetable" /suu + =ɑ/ → /suu=iɑ/
- "person" /pstu + =ɑ/ → /pstɑ=ɑ/

Ryukyuan languages typically have a pitch accent system where some mora in a word bears the pitch accent. They commonly either have two or three distinctive types of pitch accent which may be applied. The category of foot also has relevance to the accentual systems of some Ryukyuan languages, and some Miyako varieties have a cross-linguistically rare system of tonal foot. However, Irabu Miyakoan does not have lexical accent.

== Grammar ==
=== Morphology ===
The Ryukyuan languages consistently distinguish between the word classes of nouns and verbs, distinguished by the fact that verbs take inflectional morphology. Property-concept (adjectival) words are generally bound morphemes. One strategy they use is compounding with a free-standing noun:

imi- + ffa → imi-ffa
small {} child {} {small child}

kjura- + ʔkin → kjura-gin
beautiful {} kimono {} {beautiful kimono}

Compounding is found in both Northern and Southern Ryukyuan, but is mostly absent from Hateruma (Yaeyama).

Another way property stems are used is by verbalization:

an kɨɨ=ja taa-sar-oo
that tree=TOP tall-VLZ-SUPP
"That tree is supposed to be tall."

Miyako is unique in having stand-alone adjectives. These may be formed by reduplication of the root, e.g. Irabu Miyako imi- "small" → imii-imi "small (adj.)". They may also be compounded with a grammaticalized noun munu "thing", e.g. Irabu imi-munu 'small (thing)'.

=== Syntax ===
Ryukyuan languages are generally SOV, dependent-marking, modifier-head, nominative-accusative languages. They are also pro-drop languages. All of these features are shared with the Japanese language.

In many Ryukyuan languages, the nominative and genitive are marked identically, a system also found, for example, in Austronesian languages. However, Ryukyuan has the unusual feature that these markers vary based on an animacy hierarchy. Typically there are two markers of the form =ga and =nu, which are distinguished based on animacy and definiteness. In Yuwan Amami, for instance, the nominative is marked with =ga / =nu and the genitive by =ga / =nu / =Ø based on the following hierarchy:

Yuwan Amami nominative marker
human pronouns	=ga
demonstratives	=ga
elder kinship terms	=ga
other nouns	=nu

Yuwan Amami genitive marker
human pronouns, adnominal	=ga
demonstratives	=ga
human names	=Ø
elder kinship terms	=Ø
other nouns	=nu

In the Miyako varieties, the object in a dependent clause of clause-chaining constructions has a special marker, homophonous to a topic marker. This might even be interpreted as another function of the topic marker.

Hateruma Yaeyama stands out in that it is a zero-marking language, where word order rather than case marking is important:

pïtu=Ø budur-ja-ta-n
person=CORE dance-PRF-PAST-REAL
"People danced."

aboa=Ø ija=Ø mir-i bir-ja-ta-n
mother=CORE father=CORE look-MED PROG-PRF-PAST-REAL
"(My) mother was looking at (my) father."

The Ryukyuan languages mark both topic and focus grammatically. The typical form of the topic marker is =(j)a, or in Southern Ryukyuan =ba; the typical focus marker is =du. In some Ryukyuan languages there are many focus markers with different functions; for instance, Irabu has =du in declarative clauses, =ru in yes-no interrogative clauses, and =ga in wh-interrogative clauses. The focus markers trigger a special verbal inflection—this typologically unusual focus construction, known as kakari-musubi, was also found in Old Japanese, but has been lost in Modern Japanese.

Examples from Yuwan Amami:

kurɨ=ba=du jum-ju-i
this=ACC-FOC read=IPFV-NPST
"(I) read this."

uroo kun hon=ba=du jum-jur-ui?
2SG.NHON this book=ACC-FOC read=IPFV-FOC.YNQ
"Will you read this book?" (yes–no question)

uroo nuu=ba=ga jum-jur-u?
2SG.NHON.TOP what=ACC-FOC read=IPFV-FOC.WHQ
"What will you read?" (wh-question)

While in many Japonic languages this special inflection is often identical to the verbal inflection in relative clauses, in Yuwan Amami is different (the relative inflection is -n / -tan). There is some variation among the Ryukyuan languages as to the form of kakari-musubi—for example, in Irabu Miyako a focus marker blocks a specific verb form, rather than triggering a special inflection.

== Vocabulary ==
Thorpe (1983) reconstructs the following pronouns in Proto-Ryukyuan. For the first person, the singular and plural are assumed based on the Yonaguni reflex.

- *a, 'I' (singular)
- *wa 'we' (plural)
- *u, *e 'you' (singular)
- *uya, *ura 'you' (plural)

Ryukyuan numerals
	Proto-Ryukyuan	Amami Ōshima (Note: Numerals for counting inanimates.)	Shuri (Okinawa)	Hatoma (Yaeyama)	Miyako	Yonaguni
1	*pito	tïï-	tii-	pusu-	pitii-	tʼu-
2	*puta	taa-	taa-	huta-	ftaa-	tʼa-
3	*mi	mii-	mii-	mii-	mii-	mii-
4	*yo	juu-	juu-	juu-	juu-	duu-
5	*etu	ïcï-	ici-	ici-	itss-	ici-
6	*mu	muu-	muu-	muu-	mm-	muu-
7	*nana	nana-	nana-	nana-	nana-	nana-
8	*ya	jaa-	jaa-	jaa-	jaa-	daa-
9	*kokono	kuunu-	kukunu-	(ku)kunu-	kkunu-	kuɡunu-
10	*towo	tuu	tuu	tuu	tuu	tuu

Pellard (2015) reconstructs the following cultural vocabulary words for Proto-Ryukyuan.

Gloss	Proto-Ryukyuan
rice	*kome B
rice	*mai A
rice plant	*ine B
unhulled rice	*momi A
wheat	*mogi B
foxtail millet	*awa B
broomcorn millet	*kimi B
taro, yam	*umo B
field	*patake C
rice paddy	*ta B
cow	*usi A
pig	*uwa C
horse	*uma B
pot	*tubo A
jar	*kame C
boat	*pune C
sail	*po A
paddle	*ijako B

== See also ==
- Ryūka
- Jōmon

== Bibliography ==
- Izuyama, Atsuko (2012). "Yonaguni". In Tranter, Nicolas (ed.). The Languages of Japan and Korea. Routledge. pp. 412–457. ISBN 978-0-415-46287-7.
- Lawrence, Wayne P. (2012). "Southern Ryukyuan". In Tranter, Nicolas (ed.). The Languages of Japan and Korea. Routledge. pp. 381–411. ISBN 978-0-415-46287-7.
- Pellard, Thomas (2015). "The Linguistic archeology of the Ryukyu Islands". In Heinrich, Patrick; Miyara, Shinsho; Shimoji, Michinori (eds.). Handbook of the Ryukyuan languages: History, structure, and use (PDF). Berlin: De Mouton Gruyter. pp. 13–37. doi:10.1515/9781614511151.13. ISBN 978-1-61451-115-1. S2CID 54004881.
- Shimoji, Michinori (2012). "Northern Ryukyuan". In Tranter, Nicolas (ed.). The Languages of Japan and Korea. Routledge. pp. 351–380. ISBN 978-0-415-46287-7.
- Shimoji, Michinori; Pellard, Thomas, eds. (2010). An Introduction to Ryukyuan languages (PDF). Tokyo: ILCAA. ISBN 978-4-86337-072-2.
- Sugita, Yuko (2007). Language revitalization or language fossilization? Some suggestions for language documentation from the viewpoint of interactional linguistics (PDF). Proceedings of Conference on Language Documentation and Linguistic Theory. London: SOAS. ISBN 978-0-7286-0382-0.
- Takara, Ben (February 2007). "On Reclaiming a Ryukyuan Culture" (PDF). Connect. 10 (4). Irifune: IMADR: 14–16. Archived from the original (PDF) on May 20, 2011.
