= Amami languages =

Northern Ryukyuan dialect clusters

- Geographic distribution: Amami Islands, Japan
- Ethnicity: Ryukyuan
- Linguistic classification: Japonic: Ryukyuan; Northern; Amami languages
- Subdivisions: Amami Ōshima; Southern Amami Ōshima; Kikai?; Tokunoshima; Okinoerabu?; Yoron?

Language codes
- Glottolog: amam1245
- ELP: Amami

The Amami languages are a collection of dialect clusters spoken across the Amami Islands of Kagoshima Prefecture, Japan. All dialects are members of the Ryukyuan languages, specifically its northern branch.

== Classification ==
There are many distinct clusters of the Amami languages, most of which have their own ISO 639-3 codes:

- Amami languages
  - Amami Ōshima
    - Northern Amami Ōshima
    - Southern Amami Ōshima
  - Kikai
  - Tokunoshima
  - Okinoerabu
  - Yoron

Scholars are divided on the specific subgrouping of these dialects. The Okinoerabu and Yoron clusters may be grouped within the Kunigami language.
