= Kikai language =

Dialect cluster of Northern Ryukyuan

Kikai
- シマユミタ
- Native to: Japan
- Region: Kikai Island of the Amami Islands, Kagoshima Prefecture
- Native speakers: (13,000 cited 2000)
- Language family: Japonic: Ryukyuan; Northern Ryukyuan; Amami; Kikai
- Writing system: Japanese

Language codes
- ISO 639-3: kzg
- Glottolog: kika1239

Park sign in Kikaijima

The Kikai language is spoken on Kikai Island, Kagoshima Prefecture of southwestern Japan. It is debated whether it is a single dialect cluster. Regardless, all Kikai dialects are members of the Amami–Okinawan languages, which are part of the Japonic languages.

== Classification ==
The classification of Kikai is disputed. Some even dispute the existence of the Kikai cluster.

The languages of the Amami Islands can be divided into the conservative northern group (Northern Amami Ōshima, Southern Amami Ōshima and Tokunoshima) and the innovative southern group (Okinoerabu and Yoron). The problem here is which Kikai belongs to.

It has been noted that northern communities of Kikai are phonologically more conservative and show some similarity to Amami Ōshima and Tokunoshima while the rest of the island is closer to Southern Amami. For example, Northern Kikai retains seven vowels, /a/, /e/, /i/, /o/, /u/, /ɨ/ and /ɘ/ while South–Central Kikai only has five vowels. /k/ is palatalized into /t͡ɕ/ before /i/ in South–Central Kikai but not in Northern Kikai.

For this reason, Nakamoto (1976) disassembled Kikai into two:

- Amami dialect
  - Northern Amami dialect
    - Northern Amami Ōshima
    - Southern Amami Ōshima
    - Northern Kikai
  - Southern Amami dialect
    - Southern Kikai
    - Okinoerabu
    - Yoron

By contrast, Karimata (2000) tentatively supported the Kikai cluster in consideration of other shared phonological features. Lawrence (2011) argued that lexical evidence supported the Kikai cluster although he refrained from determining its phylogenetic relationship with other Amami dialects.

Pellard (2018) presented a drastically different classification. Based on the irregular sound change *kaja>gja for thatch, he grouped Tokunoshima, Okinoerabu, and Yoron into a clade, and treated Amami Ōshima, Kikai, and the resultant clade as the primary branches of Amami.

- Amami
  - Ōshima
  - Kikai
  - - Tokunoshima
    - Okinoerabu
    - Yoron

== Internal classification ==
There are 33 local communities on Kikai Island. Despite being a small, flat island, Kikai shows considerable variations in lexicon, phonology and morphology. The languages on the island are mutually intelligible. The northern communities of Onotsu, Shitooke (and Sateku) are phonologically more conservative than the rest of the island.

== Folk terminology ==
Iwakura Ichirō (岩倉市郎, 1904–1943), a folklorist from the village of Aden (阿伝), stated that a language of Kikai Island was called /simajumita/ in the language of Aden.

== Phonology ==
The following is the phonology of the Onotsu dialect, which is based on Shirata (2013b).

As with most Ryukyuan languages to the north of Central Okinawan, stops are described as "plain" C’ and "glottalized" C‘. Phonetically, the two series are aspirated [Cʰ] and tenuis [C˭], respectively.

=== Northern Kikai ===
==== Consonants ====
Consonant phonemes
	Bilabial			Alveolar			Post- alveolar			Palatal	Velar			Glottal
	LEN	FOR	VOX	LEN	FOR	VOX	LEN	FOR	VOX	Palatal	LEN	FOR	VOX	Glottal
Nasal			m			n							ŋ	
Stop	pʰ	(p˭)	b	tʰ	t˭	d					kʰ	k˭	ɡ	
Affricate				t͡sʰ										
Fricative				s		z								h
Approximant										j			w	
Flap									ɾ					

==== Vowels ====
According to Shirata (2013b), Onotsu dialect has /a/, /e/, /i/, /o/ and /u/. In more conventional interpretations, two more vowels /ɨ/ and /ɘ/ are added. Following Hattori (1999), Shirata analyzes conventional /Ci/ and /Cɨ/ as /Cji/ and /Ci/, respectively. Similarly, /Ce/ and /Cɘ/ are interpreted as /Cje/ and /Ce/.

=== South–Central Kikai ===
The following is the phonology of the Kamikatetsu dialect, which is based on Shirata (2013a).

==== Consonants ====
Consonant phonemes
	Bilabial			Alveolar			Post- alveolar			Palatal	Velar			Glottal
	LEN	FOR	VOX	LEN	FOR	VOX	LEN	FOR	VOX	Palatal	LEN	FOR	VOX	Glottal
Nasal			m			n							ŋ	
Stop		(p˭)	b	tʰ	t˭	d					kʰ	k˭	ɡ	
Affricate				(t͡sʰ)			t͡ɕʰ							
Fricative				s		z			(ʑ)					h
Approximant										j			w	
Flap									ɾ					

==== Vowels ====
Kamikatetsu has /a/, /e/, /i/, /o/ and /u/.

== Sources ==
- Kikaijima hōgen-shū (1977[1941]) by Iwakura Ichirō. A dictionary for the author's home community, Aden, and a couple of other southern communities on Kikai Island of the Amami Islands. Can also be accessed at the NDL Digital Collections here.
- Research Data on the Kikaijima Dialects Written in Kana (2012) edited by Ogawa Shinji. Contains basic vocabulary and sentences collected in nine communities of Kikai.
