= Japonic languages =

Language family of Japan

Japonic
- Japanese–Ryukyuan
- Geographic distribution: Japanese archipelago, Ryukyu Islands, possibly formerly on the Korean Peninsula
- Linguistic classification: One of the world's primary language families
- Proto-language: Proto-Japonic
- Subdivisions: Japanese; Ryukyuan; Hachijō; †Peninsular ?

Language codes
- ISO 639-5: jpx
- Glottolog: japo1237
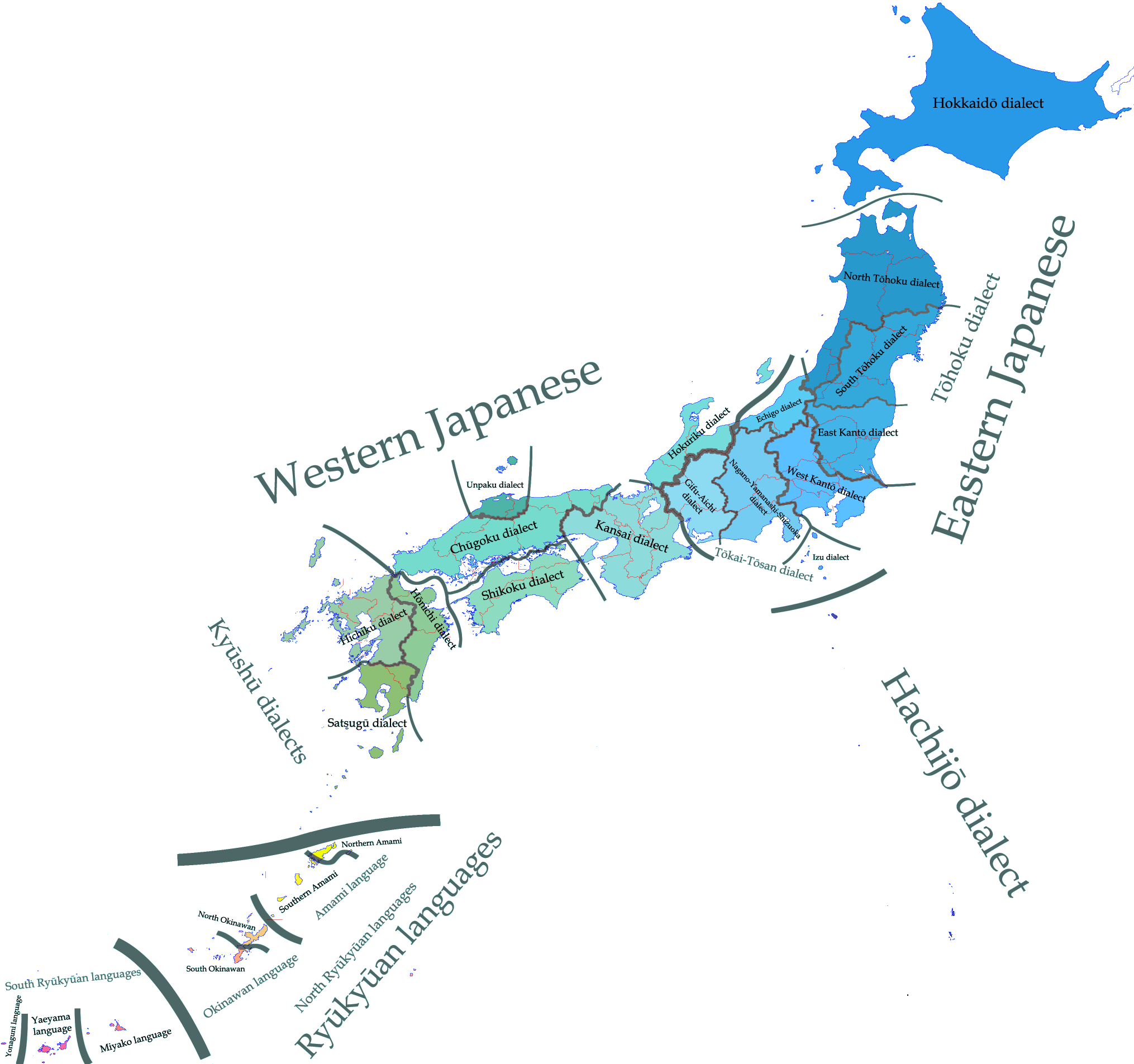
- Modern Japonic languages and dialects

Japonic or Japanese–Ryukyuan (Japanese: 日琉語族, romanized: Nichiryū gozoku) is a language family comprising Japanese, spoken in the main islands of Japan, and the Ryukyuan languages, spoken in the Ryukyu Islands. The family is universally accepted by linguists, and significant progress has been made in reconstructing the proto-language, Proto-Japonic. The reconstruction implies a split between all dialects of Japanese and all Ryukyuan varieties, probably before the 7th century. The Hachijō language, spoken on the Izu Islands, is also included, but its position within the family is unclear.

Most scholars believe that Japonic was brought to the Japanese archipelago from the Korean Peninsula with the Yayoi culture during the 1st millennium BC. Fragmentary evidence suggests that Japonic languages may still have been spoken in central and southern parts of the Korean Peninsula (see Peninsular Japonic) in the early centuries AD. Possible genetic relationships with many other language families have been proposed, most systematically with Koreanic, but no genetic relationship has been conclusively demonstrated.

Syllables in Japonic languages have the form (C)V, with optional nasal coda, geminate consonant or lengthened vowel. Most Japonic languages have voicing opposition for obstruents. As in Koreanic and Ainu, there is a single liquid consonant phoneme. A five-vowel system is most common. Most Japonic varieties have a lexical pitch accent (as do Ainu and some Korean varieties), but the structure of the accent system varies between varieties. Japonic languages, again like Ainu and Korean, are left-branching, with a basic subject–object–verb word order. Verbs which have extensive inflectional morphology, while nominals have agglutinative suffixing morphology.

== Classification ==
The extant Japonic languages belong to two well-defined branches: Japanese and Ryukyuan. Most scholars believe that Japonic was brought to northern Kyushu from the Korean Peninsula around 700 to 300 BC by wet-rice farmers of the Yayoi culture and spread throughout the Japanese archipelago, replacing indigenous languages. (Note: Roy Andrew Miller identified the arrival of Japonic with the Early Jōmon period (c. 3000 BC), but this is difficult to reconcile with the relatively shallow depth of Japonic and the presence of Japonic placenames on the Korean peninsula in the 1st millennium AD.) The former wider distribution of Ainu languages is confirmed by placenames in northern Honshu ending in -betsu (from Ainu pet 'river') and -nai (from Ainu nai 'stream'). Somewhat later, Japonic languages also spread southward to the Ryukyu Islands. There is fragmentary placename evidence that now-extinct Japonic languages were still spoken in central and southern parts of the Korean peninsula several centuries later.

=== Japanese ===
Japanese is the de facto national language of Japan, where it is spoken by about 126 million people. The oldest attestation is Old Japanese, which was recorded using Chinese characters in the 7th and 8th centuries. It differed from Modern Japanese in having a simple (C)V syllable structure and avoiding vowel sequences. The script also distinguished eight vowels (or diphthongs), with two each corresponding to modern i, e and o. Most of the texts reflect the speech of the area around Nara, the eighth-century Japanese capital, but over 300 poems were written in eastern dialects of Old Japanese.

The language experienced a massive influx of Sino-Japanese vocabulary after the introduction of Buddhism in the 6th century and peaking with the wholesale importation of Chinese culture in the 8th and the 9th centuries. The loanwords now account for about half the lexicon. They also affected the sound system of the language by adding compound vowels, syllable-final nasals, and geminate consonants, which became separate morae. Most of the changes in morphology and syntax reflected in the modern language took place during the Late Middle Japanese period (13th to 16th centuries).

Modern mainland Japanese dialects, spoken on Honshu, Kyushu, Shikoku, and Hokkaido, are generally grouped as follows:

- Eastern Japanese, including most dialects from Nagoya east, including the modern standard Tokyo dialect.
- Western Japanese, including most dialects west of Nagoya, including the Kyoto dialect.
- Kyushu dialects, spoken on the island of Kyushu, including the Kagoshima dialect/Satsugū dialect, spoken in Kagoshima Prefecture in southern Kyushu.

The early capitals of Nara and Kyoto lay within the western area, and their Kansai dialect retained its prestige and influence long after the capital was moved to Edo (modern Tokyo) in 1603. Indeed, the Tokyo dialect has several western features not found in other eastern dialects.

Post-war geolinguistic studies have identified bundles of isoglosses, often coinciding with geographic features.

- A large bundle, running north–south through the Japanese Alps, forms the basis of the traditional East–West dialect division.
- Another set of isoglosses separates peripheral areas, mainly northern Honshu and western Kyushu but also Izumo and the southern part of the Kii Peninsula, from the central area. Numerous innovations have spread through the central area, with the peripheral areas preserving older forms. Researchers have found it more difficult to explain other isoglosses in which peripheral areas share mergers of pitch accent classes and reduction of vowel sequences that are preserved in the central area, particularly the Kansai region.
- Several isoglosses run roughly east–west, from Fukushima to the western end of Honshu, and corresponding to the 0 °C isotherm and 1000 mm isohyet.

The Hachijō language, spoken on Hachijō-jima and the Daitō Islands, including Aogashima, is highly divergent and varied. It has a mix of conservative features inherited from Eastern Old Japanese and influences from modern Japanese, making it difficult to classify. Hachijō is an endangered language, with a small population of elderly speakers.

=== Ryukyuan ===
Southern and central Ryukyu islands

The Ryukyuan languages were originally and traditionally spoken throughout the Ryukyu Islands, an island arc stretching between the southern Japanese island of Kyushu and the island of Taiwan. Most of them are considered "definitely" or "critically endangered" because of the spread of mainland Japanese.

Since Old Japanese displayed several innovations that are not shared with Ryukyuan, the two branches must have separated before the 7th century. The move from Kyushu to the Ryukyus may have occurred later and possibly coincided with the rapid expansion of the agricultural Gusuku culture in the 10th and 11th centuries. Such a date would explain the presence in Proto-Ryukyuan of Sino-Japanese vocabulary borrowed from Early Middle Japanese. After the migration to the Ryukyus, there was limited influence from mainland Japan until the conquest of the Ryukyu Kingdom by the Satsuma Domain in 1609.

Ryukyuan varieties are considered dialects of Japanese in Japan but have little intelligibility with Japanese or even among one another. They are divided into northern and southern groups, corresponding to the physical division of the chain by the 250 km-wide Miyako Strait.

Northern Ryukyuan languages are spoken in the northern part of the chain, including the major Amami and Okinawa Islands. They form a single dialect continuum, with mutual unintelligibility between widely separated varieties. The major varieties are, from northeast to southwest:

- Kikai, on the island of Kikaijima.
- Northern Amami Ōshima, spoken in most of Amami Ōshima
- Southern Amami Ōshima, spoken in Setouchi on the southern end of Amami Ōshima.
- Tokunoshima, on the island of Tokunoshima.
- Okinoerabu, on the island of Okinoerabujima
- Yoron, on the island of Yoronjima.
- Kunigami or Northern Okinawan, spoken in the northern part of Okinawa Island, including the cities of Nakijin and Nago.
- (Central) Okinawan, spoken in the central and southern parts of Okinawa Island, and neighboring islands. The prestige dialect is spoken in Naha, and the former city of Shuri. The Shuri dialect was the lingua franca of the Ryukyuan Kingdom, and was first recorded in the 16th century, particularly in the Omoro Sōshi anthology.

There is no agreement on the subgrouping of the varieties. One proposal, adopted by the UNESCO Atlas of the World's Languages in Danger, has three subgroups, with the central "Kunigami" branch comprising varieties from Southern Amami to Northern Okinawan, based on similar vowel systems and patterns of lenition of stops. Pellard suggests a binary division based on shared innovations, with an Amami group including the varieties from Kikai to Yoron, and an Okinawa group comprising the varieties of Okinawa and smaller islands to its west.

Southern Ryukyuan languages are spoken in the southern part of the chain, the Sakishima Islands. They comprise three distinct dialect continua:

- Miyako is spoken in the Miyako Islands, with dialects on Irabu and Tarama.
- Yaeyama is spoken in the Yaeyama Islands (except Yonaguni), with dialects on each island, but primarily Ishigaki Island, Iriomote Island, and Taketomi Island.
- Yonaguni, spoken on Yonaguni Island, is phonologically distinct but lexically closer to other Yaeyama varieties.

The southern Ryukyus were settled by Japonic-speakers from the northern Ryukyus in the 13th century, leaving no linguistic trace of the indigenous inhabitants of the islands.

=== Alternative classifications ===
An alternative classification, based mainly on the development of the pitch accent, groups the highly divergent Kagoshima dialects of southwestern Kyushu with Ryukyuan in a Southwestern branch. Kyushu and Ryukyuan varieties also share some lexical items, some of which appear to be innovations. The internal classification by Elisabeth de Boer includes Ryukyuan as a deep subbranch of a Kyūshū–Ryūkyū branch:

- Japonic
  - Eastern
  - Central
  - Izumo–Tōhoku
  - Kyūshū–Ryūkyū

She also proposes a branch consisting of the Izumo dialect (spoken on the northern coast of western Honshu) and the Tōhoku dialects (northern Honshu), which show similar developments in the pitch accent that she attributes to sea-borne contacts.

=== Peninsular Japonic ===
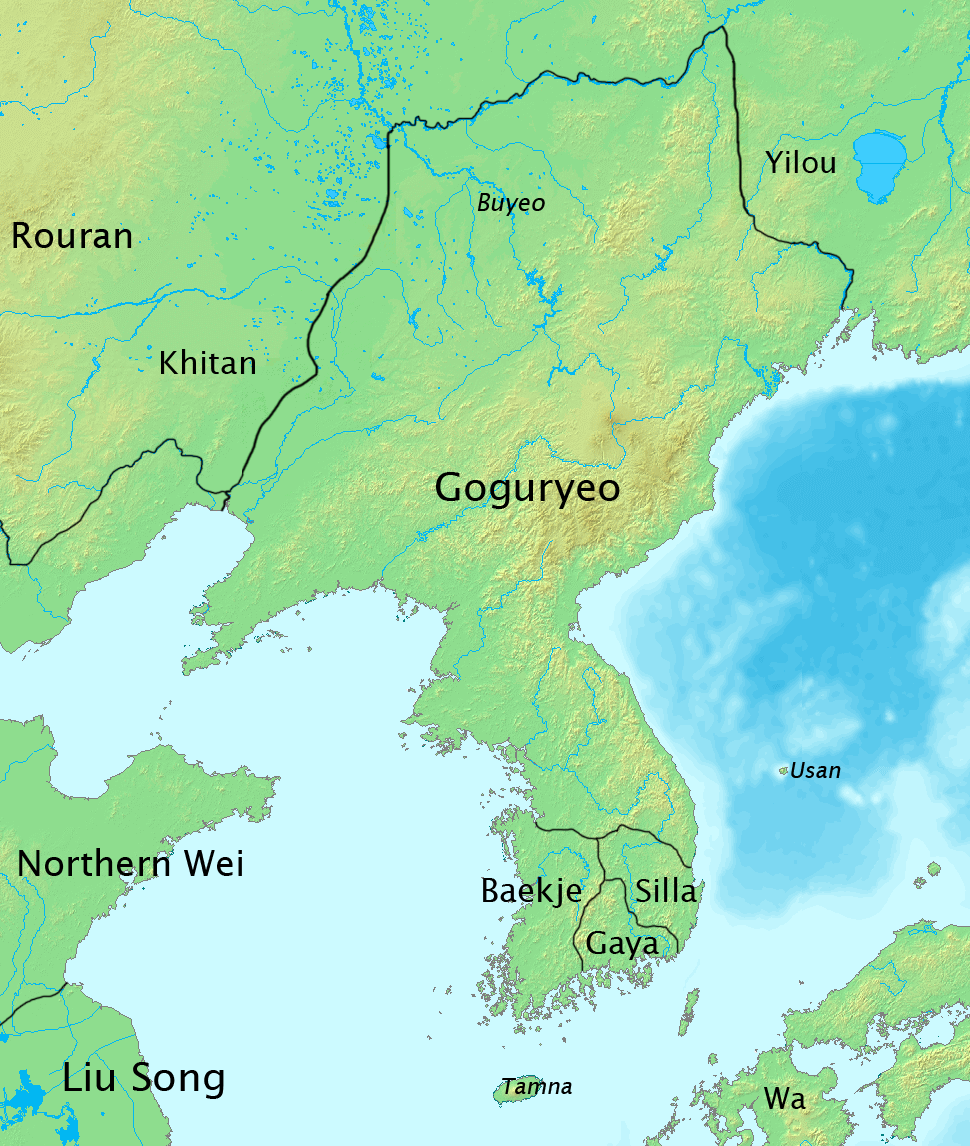
Korea in the late 5th century

There is fragmentary evidence suggesting that now-extinct Japonic languages were spoken in the central and southern parts of the Korean peninsula. Vovin calls these languages Peninsular Japonic and groups Japanese and Ryukyuan as Insular Japonic.

The most-cited evidence comes from chapter 37 of the Samguk sagi (compiled in 1145), which contains a list of pronunciations and meanings of placenames in the former kingdom of Goguryeo. As the pronunciations are given using Chinese characters, they are difficult to interpret, but several of those from central Korea, in the area south of the Han River captured from Baekje in the 5th century, seem to correspond to Japonic words. Scholars differ on whether they represent the language of Goguryeo or the people that it conquered.

Japonic etymologies have been proposed for a few words from the south of the peninsula:

- The Silla placenames listed in Chapter 34 of the Samguk sagi are not glossed, but many of them can be explained as Japonic words.
- Alexander Vovin proposes Japonic etymologies for two of four Baekje words given in the Book of Liang (635).
- A single word is explicitly attributed to the language of the southern Gaya confederacy, in Chapter 44 of the Samguk sagi. It is a word for 'gate' and appears to have a similar form to the Old Japanese word to₂, with the same meaning.
- Vovin suggests that the ancient name for the kingdom of Tamna on Jeju Island, tammura, may have a Japonic etymology tani mura 'valley settlement' or tami mura 'people's settlement'. He also proposes Japonic etymologies for two other local words.

=== Proposed external relationships ===
According to Shirō Hattori, more attempts have been made to link Japanese with other language families than for any other language. None of the attempts has succeeded in demonstrating a common descent for Japonic and any other language family.

The most systematic comparisons have involved Korean, which has a very similar grammatical structure to Japonic languages. Common vocabulary between the two languages was noted in 1719 by Arai Hakuseki, who listed 82 items. Samuel Elmo Martin, J. Marshall Unger, John Whitman and others have proposed hundreds of possible cognates, with sound correspondences. However, Alexander Vovin points out that Old Japanese contains several pairs of words of similar meaning in which one word matches a Korean form, and the other is also found in Ryukyuan and Eastern Old Japanese, suggesting that the former is an early loan from Korean. He suggests that to eliminate such early loans, Old Japanese morphemes should not be assigned a Japonic origin unless they are also attested in Southern Ryukyuan or Eastern Old Japanese. That criterion leaves fewer than a dozen possible cognates, which may have been borrowed by Korean from Peninsular Japonic. In response, Whitman narrowed his list of cognates, and also identified 12 common inflectional morphemes, but Vovin has identified problems with these morphemes. A serious problem for proposals to link the two languages is the lack of shared basic vocabulary. Even scholars who argue for a relationship agree that it would be distant.

== Typology ==
Most Japonic languages have voicing opposition for obstruents, with exceptions such as the Miyako dialect of Ōgami. Glottalized consonants are common in North Ryukyuan languages but are rarer in South Ryukyuan. Proto-Japonic had only voiceless obstruents, like Ainu and proto-Korean. Japonic languages also resemble Ainu and modern Korean in having a single liquid consonant phoneme. A five-vowel system like Standard Japanese /a/, /i/, /u/, /e/ and /o/ is common, but some Ryukyuan languages also have central vowels /ə/ and /ɨ/, and Yonaguni has only /a/, /i/, and /u/.

In most Japonic languages, speech rhythm is based on a subsyllabic unit, the mora. Each syllable has a basic mora of the form (C)V but a nasal coda, geminate consonant, or lengthened vowel counts as an additional mora. However, some dialects in northern Honshu or southern Kyushu have syllable-based rhythm.

Like Ainu, Middle Korean, and some modern Korean dialects, most Japonic varieties have a lexical pitch accent, which governs whether the moras of a word are pronounced high or low, but it follows widely-different patterns. In Tokyo-type systems, the basic pitch of a word is high, with an accent (if present) marking the position of a drop to low pitch. In Kyushu dialects, the basic pitch is low, with accented syllables given high pitch. In Kyoto-type systems, both types are used.

Japonic languages, again like Ainu and Korean, are left-branching (or head-final), with a basic subject–object–verb word order, modifiers before nouns, and postpositions. There is a clear distinction between verbs, which have extensive inflectional morphology, and nominals, with agglutinative suffixing morphology. Ryukyuan languages inflect all adjectives in the same way as verbs, while mainland varieties have classes of adjectives that inflect as nouns and verbs respectively.

Most Japonic languages mark singular and plural number, but some Northern Ryukyuan languages also have the dual. Most Ryukyuan languages mark a clusivity distinction in plural (or dual) first-person pronouns, but no Mainland varieties do so. The most common type of morphosyntactic alignment is nominative–accusative, but neutral (or direct), active–stative and (very rarely) tripartite alignment are found in some Japonic languages.

== Proto-Japonic ==
The proto-language of the family has been reconstructed by using a combination of internal reconstruction from Old Japanese and by applying the comparative method to Old Japanese (including eastern dialects) and Ryukyuan. The major reconstructions of the 20th century were produced by Samuel Elmo Martin and Shirō Hattori.

Proto-Japonic words are generally polysyllabic, with syllables having the form (C)V. The following proto-Japonic consonant inventory is generally agreed upon, except that some scholars argue for voiced stops *b and *d instead of glides *w and *j:

Proto-Japonic consonants
	Bilabial	Alveolar	Palatal	Velar
Stop	*p	*t		*k
Nasal	*m	*n		
Fricative		*s		
Tap		*r		
Approximant	*w		*j	

The Old Japanese voiced consonants b, d, z and g, which never occurred word-initially, are derived from clusters of nasals and voiceless consonants arising from the loss of an intervening vowel.

Most authors accept six Proto-Japonic vowels:

Proto-Japonic vowels
	Front	Central	Back
Close	*i		*u
Mid	*e	*ə	*o
Open		*a	

Some authors also propose a high central vowel *ɨ. The mid vowels *e and *o were raised to Old Japanese i and u respectively, except word-finally. Other Old Japanese vowels arose from sequences of Proto-Japonic vowels.

It is generally accepted that a lexical pitch accent should be reconstructed for Proto-Japonic, but its precise form is controversial.
