= Shirō Hattori =

Japanese linguist (1908–1995)

Shirō Hattori (服部四郎, Hattori Shirō; May 29, 1908 – January 29, 1995) was a Japanese academic and writer. Born in Kameyama, Mie, Hattori was a linguist known particularly for his work on premodern Japanese and Japonic languages and the Ainu language. He was a professor at the University of Tokyo.

== Selected works ==
In a statistical overview derived from writings by and about Shiro Hattori, OCLC/WorldCat encompasses roughly 150+ works in 200+ publications in 8 languages and 1,300+ library holdings.

- 音聲學 (1951)
- Genealogy of the Japanese Language (日本語の系統, Nihongo no keitō) (1959)
- Dictionary of Ainu Dialects (アイヌ語方言辞典, Ainu Go Hōgen Jiten) (1964)
- 音韻論と正書法: 新日本式つづり方の提唱 (1979)

== Awards and honors ==
- Order of Culture
- Indiana University Prize for Altaic Studies, 1983
- Australian Academy of the Humanities, Honorary Fellow, 1984
