= Southern Amami Ōshima language =

Ryukyuan language spoken in Japan

Southern Amami Ōshima
- Native to: Japan
- Region: Setouchi, Kagoshima
- Ethnicity: Ryukyuan
- Native speakers: 1,800 (2004)
- Language family: Japonic: Ryukyuan; Northern Ryukyuan; Amami; Amami Ōshima; Southern Amami Ōshima
- Writing system: Japanese

Language codes
- ISO 639-3: ams
- Glottolog: sout2954

The Southern Amami Ōshima language is a Ryukyuan language spoken in Setouchi, Kagoshima Prefecture, Japan. It is generally considered to be the southern variety of the Amami Ōshima language, whereas a separate northern variety exists.

According to Ethnologue, there are 1,800 speakers of Southern Amami Ōshima. The northern variety has 10,000 speakers. Both of these languages are endangered, as younger generations either speak Japanese or a local variety of Japanese known as Ton-futsūgo.

== See also ==
- Amami Ōshima language
- Ryukyuan languages
- Amami Ōshima
