= Okinoerabu dialect cluster =

Dialect cluster of Northern Ryukyuan

Okinoerabu
- 島ムニ; Shimamuni
- Native to: Japan
- Region: Okinoerabu Island of the Amami Islands, Kagoshima Prefecture
- Native speakers: 3,200 (2004)
- Language family: Japonic: Ryukyuan; Northern Ryukyuan; Amami or Kunigami; Okinoerabu
- Writing system: Japanese

Language codes
- ISO 639-3: okn
- Glottolog: okin1246

The Okinoerabu dialect cluster (島ムニ Shimamuni), also Oki-no-Erabu, is a dialect cluster spoken on Okinoerabu Island, Kagoshima Prefecture of southwestern Japan. It is part of the Amami–Okinawan languages, which are part of the Japonic languages.

== Dialects ==
Isoglosses

Okinoerabu dialects are classified into two groups:

- Eastern Okinoerabu
- Western Okinoerabu

The linguistic boundary between Eastern and Western Okinoerabu roughly corresponds to the administrative boundary between Wadomari (east) and China (west). In addition, the eastern community of Kunigami (part of Eastern Okinoerabu and not to be confused with Northern Okinawa) is known for sporadically retaining a centralized vowel, which is a characteristic of Northern Amami. For example, [nɨː] ("root", Japanese /ne/) is contrasted with [niː] ("loads", Japanese /ni/). The northwestern community of Tamina (part of Western Okinoerabu) has a distinctive accentual system.

Uwano (1998:131-133) gives the following dialects list of Okinoerabu:

- Kunigami
  - Kunigami
  - Nishibaru
- Wadomari
  - Degi
  - Kibiru
  - Uetedechina
  - Wadomari
  - Azefu
  - Wa
- Ōjiro
  - Tamajiro
  - Ōjiro
  - Furusato
  - Neori
  - Sena
- Uchijiro
  - Uchijiro
  - Goran
  - Nagamine
  - Taniyama
- Shimohirakawa
  - Amata
  - Yaja
  - Saozu
  - Gushiken
  - Kamihirakawa (Hyōmuni)
  - Shimohirakawa
- Ashikiyora
- Kamishiro
  - Shinjō
  - Kamishiro (also part of China)
- China
  - Kuronuki
  - Serikaku
  - China
  - Yakomo
- Shimajiri
  - Ōtsukan
  - Tokudoki
  - Sumiyoshi
  - Masana
  - Tamina

== Folk terminology ==
Takahashi Takayo (b. 1967), a cultural anthropologist from the island, stated that the language of each community or the island as a whole was called shimamuni. Each language variety within the island had distinctive characteristics. The language of the community of Kunigami on the island, for example, was referred to as Kunigami-bushi. It retained mutually intelligibility with the languages of the island's other communities. It is said that Okinoerabu was mutually unintelligible with neighboring Yoron and Tokunoshima.

== Phonology ==
=== Eastern Okinoerabu ===
The following is the phonology of the Wadomari dialect (part of Eastern Okinoerabu), which is based on Hirayama et al. (1986).

As with most Ryukyuan languages to the north of Central Okinawan, stops are described as "plain" C’ and "glottalized" C‘. Phonetically, the two series are lightly aspirated [Cʰ] and tenuis [C˭], respectively.

==== Consonants ====
Consonant phonemes
	Bilabial			Alveolar			Post- alveolar			Palatal	Velar			Glottal	Moraic
	LEN	FOR	VOX	LEN	FOR	VOX	LEN	FOR	VOX	Palatal	LEN	FOR	VOX	Glottal	Moraic
Nasal		mˀ	m		nˀ	n									N
Stop	pʰ		b	tʰ	t˭	d					kʰ	k˭	ɡ	ʔ	Q
Affricate							t͡ʃʰ	t͡ʃ˭	dz						Q
Fricative				s										h	Q
Approximant										j			w		Q
Flap									r						Q

Notes

- The zero onset /'/ may be added. It contrasts with glottal /h/ and /ʔ/. A minimal pair is /ʔiː/ [ʔiː] ("stomach"), /hiː/ [çiː] ("day") and /'iː/ [iː] ("soft rush").
- "Tense" /k˭/, /t˭/ and /t͡ʃ˭/ are in process of merging into "plain" /kʰ/, /tʰ/ and /t͡ʃʰ/, respectively.
- /h/ is [ç] before /i/ and /j/, and [ɸ] before /u/ and /w/.
- /pʰ/ is new and infrequent.
- /si/ and /t͡ʃʰu/ are realized as [ʃi] and [t͡sʰu], respectively.
- /dz/ is [d͡ʒ] before /i/ and /j/, and [d͡z] elsewhere.
- [ʃa], [ʃu] and [ʃo] are phonemically analyzed as /sja/, /sju/ and /sjo/, respectively.
- [t͡ʃʰa], [t͡ʃʰu] and [t͡ʃʰo] are phonemically analyzed as /t͡ʃʰja/, /t͡ʃʰju/ and /t͡ʃʰjo/, respectively.
- [t͡ʃa], [t͡ʃu] and [t͡ʃo] are phonemically analyzed as /t͡ʃ˭ja/, /t͡ʃ˭ju/ and /t͡ʃ˭jo/, respectively.

==== Vowels ====
Eastern Okinoerabu has /a/, /e/, /i/, /o/ and /u/, long and short.

==== Correspondences to Japanese ====
Only major sound correspondences are listed.

- Japanese /e/ is merged into /i/.
- Japanese /o/ is merged into /u/.
- Eastern Okinoerabu /e/ and /o/ are of secondary origin and mostly correspond to Japanese diphthongs.
- Japanese /t͡ʃu/, /su/ and /zu/ correspond to /t͡ʃʰi/ [t͡ʃʰi], /si/ [ʃi] and /dzi/ [dʒi].
- Japanese /k/ corresponds to /h/ by default. Japanese /ki/ and /ku/ are usually /kʰ/ in Eastern Okinoerabu, but some words have /t͡ʃʰi/ for Japanese /ki/. Reflexes in /k˭/ is occasionally found as well.
- Historical /r/ is dropped when it appears between any vowel and /i/.
- /kʰ/ and /g/ palatalized before /i/. Japanese /ki/ and /gi/ correspond to Eastern Okinoerabu /t͡ʃʰi/ and /dzi/.
- Japanese /ke/ corresponds to /hi/ in the word-initial position and to /kʰi/ elsewhere.
- The fusion of consecutive morae resulted in the glottalized and 'tense' consonants in Eastern Okinoerabu.

=== Western Okinoerabu ===
The following is the phonology of the China dialect (part of Western Okinoerabu), which is based on Hirayama et al. (1986).

==== Consonants ====
Consonant phonemes
	Bilabial			Alveolar			Post- alveolar		Palatal	Velar		Glottal	Moraic
	ASP	GLOT	VOX	ASP	GLOT	VOX	ASP	VOX	Palatal	ASP	VOX	Glottal	Moraic
Nasal		mˀ	m		nˀ	n							N
Stop	pʰ		b	tʰ		d				kʰ	ɡ	ʔ	Q
Affricate							t͡ʃʰ	dz					Q
Fricative				s								h	Q
Approximant									j		w		Q
Flap								r					Q

Notes

- The zero onset /'/ may be added. It contrasts with glottal /h/ and /ʔ/.
- /h/ is [ç] before /i/ and /j/, and [ɸ] before /u/ and /w/.
- /pʰ/ is new and infrequent.
- /si/ and /t͡ʃʰu/ are realized as [ʃi] and [t͡sʰu], respectively.
- /dz/ is [d͡ʒ] before /i/ and /j/, and [d͡z] elsewhere.
- [ʃa], [ʃe], [ʃu] and [ʃo] are phonemically analyzed as /sja/, /sje/, /sju/ and /sjo/, respectively.
- [t͡ʃʰa], [t͡ʃʰu] and [t͡ʃʰo] are phonemically analyzed as /t͡ʃʰja/, /t͡ʃʰju/ and /t͡ʃʰjo/, respectively.

==== Vowels ====
Western Okinoerabu has /a/, /e/, /i/, /o/ and /u/, long and short.

==== Differences between Eastern and Western Okinoerabu ====
- Japanese /gi/ and /ge/ are merged into /gi/ in Western Okinoerabu while they correspond to /dzi/ and /gi/ in Eastern Okinoerabu.
- Similarly, Western Okinoerabu /kʰ/ has not undergone palatalization.
- Western Okinoerabu does not have /k˭/, /t˭/ or /t͡ʃ˭/.
