= Kunigami language =

Northern Ryukyuan language

Kunigami
- 山原言葉; ヤンバルクトゥーバ; Yanbaru Kutūba
- Native to: Japan
- Region: Northern Okinawa Islands
- Native speakers: 5,000 (2004)
- Language family: Japonic: Ryukyuan; Northern; Kunigami
- Writing system: Japanese

Language codes
- ISO 639-3: xug
- Glottolog: kuni1268
- Kunigami

Kunigami, also known as Northern Okinawan or Yanbaru (山原言葉, ヤンバルクトゥーバ, Yanbaru Kutūba) is a Ryukyuan language of northern Okinawa Island in Kunigami District and the city of Nago, otherwise known as the Yanbaru region and historically encompassing the territory of the kingdom of Hokuzan.

The Nakijin dialect is often considered representative of Kunigami, analogous to the Shuri-Naha dialect of Central Okinawan. The number of fluent native speakers of Kunigami is not known. As a result of Japanese language policy, the younger generation mostly speaks Japanese as their first language.

== Location ==
In addition to the northern portion of Okinawa Island, Kunigami is spoken on the small neighboring islands of Ie, Tsuken and Kudaka.

== Scope and classification ==
Glottolog, following Pellard (2009), classifies Kunigami with Central Okinawan as the two Okinawan languages. Ethnologue adds Okinoerabu and Yoron; these (along with all other languages of the northern Ryukyu Islands) are classified as Amami languages by Glottolog. The UNESCO Atlas of the World's Languages in Danger, following Uemura (2003), includes Okinoerabu and Yoron as varieties of Kunigami.

== Folk terminology ==
The speakers of Kunigami have various words for "language", "dialect", and "style of speech". For example, linguist Nakasone Seizen (1907–1995) stated that the dialect of his home community Yonamine, Nakijin Village had (corresponding Standard Japanese word forms in parentheses): /kʰu⸢tsʰii/ (kuchi), /hut˭uu⸢ba/ (kotoba) and /munu⸢ʔii/ (monoii). The language of one's own community was referred to as /simaagu⸢tsʰii/ or /sima(a)kʰu⸢t˭uu⸣ba/. The Yonamine dialect was part of Nakijin's western dialect called /ʔirinsimaa kʰut˭uba/. The northern part of Okinawa was colloquially known as Yanbaru and hence its language was sometimes called /jˀan⸢ba⸣rukʰut˭uuba/.

== Phonology ==
Like most Ryukyuan languages north of Central Okinawan, Kunigami has series of so-called "tensed" or "glottalized" consonants. While the nasals and glides are truly glottalized, the stops are tenuis [C˭], in contrast to the aspiration of the "plain" stops [Cʰ]. Kunigami is also notable for the presence of an /h/ phoneme separate from the /p/ phoneme that is believed to be the historical source of /h/ in most other Japonic languages; Kunigami /h/ instead has two different sources: Proto-Japonic /*k/ or otherwise the zero initial in certain conditioning environments. Thus, for example, the Nakijin dialect of Kunigami has /hak˭áí/ (light, a lamp, a shōji), which is cognate with Japanese /akárí/ (light, a lamp); the Kunigami form is distinguished from its Japanese cognate by the initial /h/, tenuis /k˭/, and elision of Proto-Japonic *r before *i. The Kunigami language also makes distinctions in certain word pairs, such as Nakijin dialect /k˭umuú/ (cloud) and /húbu/ (spider), which in Japanese are almost homophonic (/kúmo/ and /kumó/).

== Morphology ==
One notable difference in the use of certain morphological markers between Kunigami language and Standard Japanese is the use of the /-sa/ form as an adverb in Kunigami: e.g. Nakijin dialect /tʰuusá pʰanaaɽít˭un/, which is equivalent to Standard Japanese toókú hanárete irú ("It is far away"). In Standard Japanese, the /-ku/ form is used adverbially, while the /-sa/ form is used exclusively to derive abstract nouns of quality and amount ("-ness" forms) from adjectival stems.

== Resources ==
- Okinawa Nakijin Hōgen Jiten by Seizen Nakasone. A dictionary of the Yonamine dialect of Nakijin village.
- Okinawa Iejima Hōgen Jiten by Mutsuko Oshio. A dictionary of the Ie dialect.
