= Northern Ryukyuan languages =

Branch of the Ryukyuan language family

Northern Ryukyuan
- Amami–Okinawan
- Geographic distribution: The Amami Islands, Kagoshima Prefecture, Okinawa Islands (Okinawa Prefecture, Japan)
- Linguistic classification: Japonic: Ryukyuan; Northern Ryukyuan
- Proto-language: Proto-Northern Ryukyuan
- Subdivisions: Amami; Kunigami; Central Okinawan

Language codes
- Glottolog: nort3255
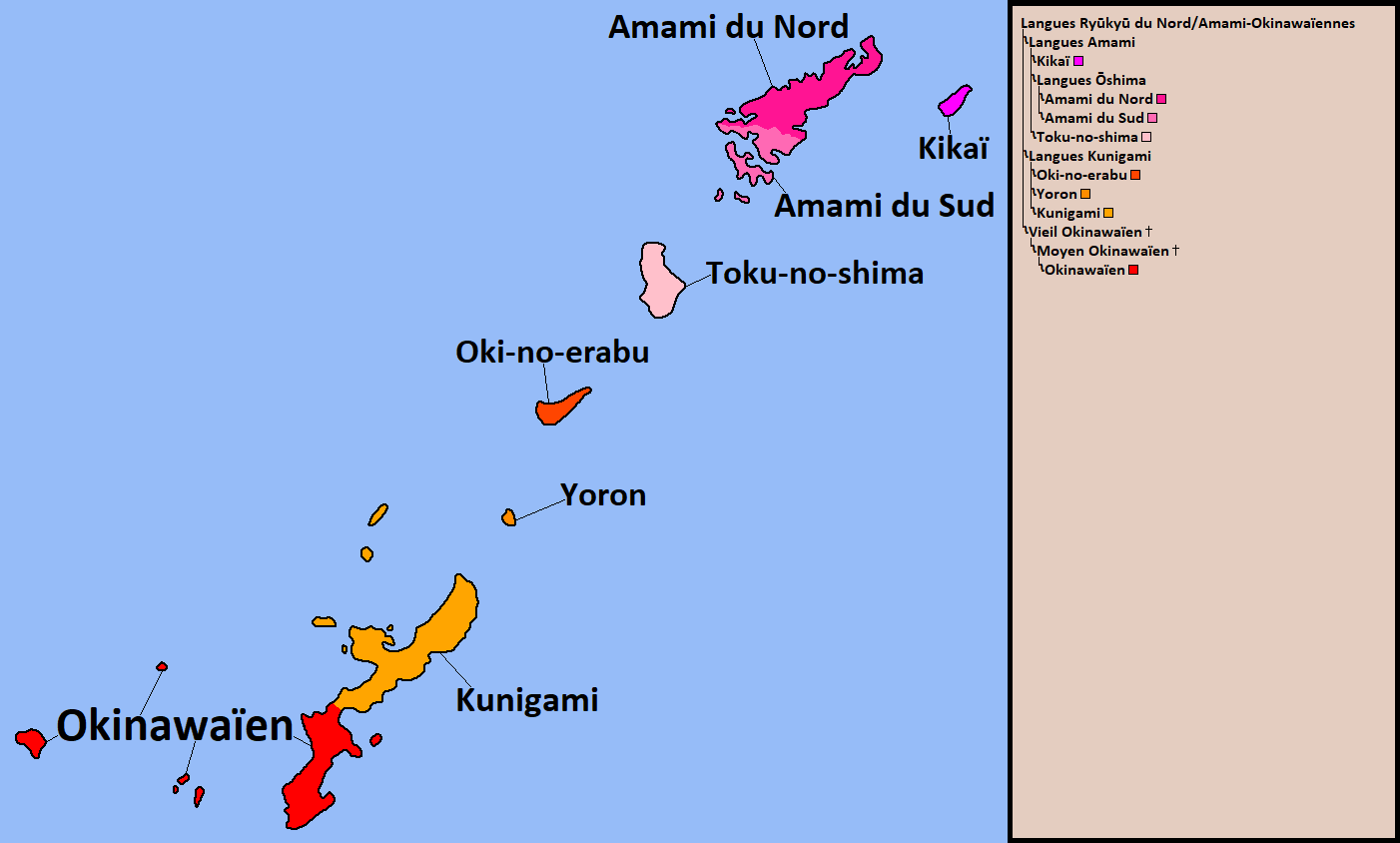

The Northern Ryukyuan languages, also known as the Amami–Okinawan languages, are a group of languages spoken in the Amami Islands, Kagoshima Prefecture and the Okinawa Islands, Okinawa Prefecture of southwestern Japan. It is one of two primary branches of the Ryukyuan languages, which are then part of the Japonic languages. The subdivisions of Northern Ryukyuan are a matter of scholarly debate.

== Internal classification ==
Within the Ryukyu Kingdom, a magiri was comparable to a Japanese prefecture while shima were individual villages. There were about 800 shima in the Ryukyu Kingdom. Linguists Seizen Nakasone and Satoshi Nishioka have proposed that each shima developed their own distinct dialects or accents due to people very rarely traveling outside of their shima.

At high level, linguists mostly agree to make the north–south division. In this framework, Northern Ryukyuan covers the Amami Islands, Kagoshima Prefecture and the Okinawa Islands, Okinawa Prefecture. The subdivision of Northern Ryukyuan, however, remains a matter of scholarly debate.

In the Okinawa-go jiten (1963), Uemura Yukio simply left its subgroups flat:

- Amami–Okinawan dialect group
  - Kikai language
  - Amami Ōshima language
    - Northern dialect
    - Southern dialect
  - Tokunoshima language
  - Okinoerabu language
    - Eastern dialect
    - Western dialect
  - Yoron language
  - Northern Okinawan (Kunigami dialect)
  - Southern Okinawan

Several others have attempted to create intermediate groups. One of two major hypotheses divides Northern Ryukyuan into Amami and Okinawan, drawing a boundary between Amami's Yoron Island and Okinawa Island. The same boundary was also set by early studies including Nakasone (1961) and Hirayama (1964). Nakamoto (1990) offered a detailed argument for it. He proposed the following classification.

- Northern Ryukyuan dialect
  - Amami dialect
    - Northern Amami
    - Southern Amami
  - Okinawan dialect
    - Northern Okinawan
    - Southern Okinawan

The other hypothesis, the three-subdivision hypothesis, is proposed by Uemura (1972). He first presented a flat list of dialects and then discussed possible groupings, one of which is as follows:

- Amami–Okinawan dialect group
  - Ōshima–Tokunoshima group
    - Ōshima
    - Tokunoshima
  - Okinoerabu–Northern Okinawan group
    - Okinoerabu
    - Northern Okinawan
  - South–Central Okinawan dialects

The difference between the two hypotheses is whether Southern Amami and Northern Okinawan form a cluster. Thorpe (1983) presented a "tentative" classification similar to Uemura's:

- Amami–Okinawa
  - North Amami
    - Kikai
    - North Ōshima
    - South Ōshima (with Kakeroma, Yoro, Uke)
    - Tokunoshima
  - South Amami–North Okinawa
    - Okierabu
    - Yoron
    - North Okinawa
    - Motobu Peninsula
    - Ieshima [sic]
    - Izena, Iheya
    - Kudaka
  - Central and South Okinawa
    - Central Okinawa
    - Kume, Aguni, Kerama
    - South Okinawa

Karimata (2000) investigated Southern Amami in detail and found inconsistency among isoglosses. Nevertheless, he favored the three-subdivision hypothesis:

- Amami–Okinawan dialect group
  - Amami–Tokunoshima dialects
  - Okinoerabu–Yoron–Northern Okinawan dialects
  - South–Central Okinawan dialects

Karimata (2000)'s proposal is based mostly on phonetic grounds. Standard Japanese /e/ corresponds to /ɨ/ in Northern Amami while it was merged into /i/ in Southern Amami and Okinawan.

	eye	hair	front
Itsubu, Naze (Amami Ōshima)	mɨ	k˭ɨ	mɘ
Shodon, Setouchi	mɨː	k˭ɨː	mɘː
Inokawa, Tokunoshima	mɨː	k˭ɨː	mɘː
Inutabu, Isen (Tokunoshima)	mɨː	k˭ɨː	mɘː
Nakazato, Kikai (Southern Kikai)	miː	k˭iː	meː
Kunigami, Wadomari (Eastern Okinoerabu)	miː	k˭iː	meː
Gushiken, China (Western Okinoerabu)	miː	kʰiː	meː
Jana, Nakijin (Northern Okinawa)	miː	k˭iː	meː
Shuritonokura, Naha (Southern Okinawa)	miː	kʰiː	meː

Word-initial /kʰ/ changed to /h/ before certain vowels in Southern Amami and several Northern Okinawan dialects while Northern Amami has /k˭/. The boundary between Northern and Southern Amami is clear while Southern Amami and Northern Okinawan have no clear isogloss.

Japanese	/ka/	/ko/	/ke/	/ku/	/ki/
Itsubu, Naze (Amami Ōshima)	k˭			kʰ	
Shodon, Setouchi	k˭			kʰ	
Inokawa, Tokunoshima	k˭			kʰ	
Inutabu, Isen (Tokunoshima)	k˭			kʰ	
Shitooke, Kikai (Northern Kikai)	h			kʰ	
Nakazato, Kikai (Southern Kikai)	h			kʰ	t͡ʃʰ
Kunigami, Wadomari (Eastern Okinoerabu)	h			kʰ	t͡ʃʰ
Wadomari, Wadomari (Eastern Okinoerabu)	h			kʰ	t͡ʃʰ
Gushiken, China (Okinoerabu)	h			kʰ	
Gusuku, Yoron	h			kʰ	
Benoki, Kunigami (Northern Okinawa)	h			kʰ	
Ōgimi, Ōgimi (Northern Okinawa)	h			kʰ	
Yonamine, Nakijin (Northern Okinawa)	h		k˭	kʰ	tʒ
Kushi, Nago (Northern Okinawa)	k˭			kʰ	
Onna, Onna (Northern Okinawa)	k˭			kʰ	
Iha, Ishikawa (Southern Okinawa)	kʰ				t͡ʃʰ
Shuri, Naha (Southern Okinawa)	kʰ				t͡ʃʰ

The pan-Japonic shift of /p > ɸ > h/ can be observed at various stages in Amami–Okinawan. Unlike Northern Amami and Southern Okinawan, Southern Amami and Northern Okinawan tend to maintain labiality, though the degree of preservation varies considerably.

Japanese	/ha/	/he/	/ho/	/hu/	/hi/
Itsubu, Naze (Amami Ōshima)	h				
Shodon, Setouchi	h				
Inokawa, Tokunoshima	h				
Inutabu, Isen (Tokunoshima)	h				
Shitooke, Kikai (Northern Kikai)	p˭		ɸ		p˭
Nakazato, Kikai (Southern Kikai)	ɸ	h	ɸ		
Kunigami, Wadomari (Eastern Okinoerabu)	ɸ				
Gushiken, China (Western Okinoerabu)	ɸ	h	ɸ		h
Gusuku, Yoron	ɸ				
Benoki, Kunigami (Northern Okinawa)	ɸ				
Ōgimi, Ōgimi (Northern Okinawa)	ɸ	pʰ	ɸ		pʰ
Yonamine, Nakijin (Northern Okinawa)	p˭			p˭	pʰ
Kushi, Nago (Northern Okinawa)	ɸ			pʰ	
Onna, Onna (Northern Okinawa)	p˭			pʰ	
Iha, Ishikawa (Southern Okinawa)	h				
Shuri, Naha (Southern Okinawa)	h	ɸ	h		ɸ

These shared features appear to support the three-subdivision hypothesis. However, Karimata also pointed out several features that group Northern and Southern Amami together. In Amami, word-medial /kʰ/ changed to /h/ or even dropped entirely when it was surrounded by /a/, /e/ or /o/. This can rarely be observed in Okinawan dialects. Japanese /-awa/ corresponds to /-oː/ in Amami and /-aː/ in Okinawan. Uemura (1972) also argued that if the purpose of classification was not of phylogeny, the two-subdivision hypothesis of Amami and Okinawan was also acceptable.

Pellard (2009) took a computational approach to the classification problem. His phylogenetic inference was based on phonological and lexical traits. The results dismissed the three-subdivision hypothesis and re-evaluated the two-subdivision hypothesis although the internal classification of Amami is substantially different from conventional ones. The renewed classification is adopted in Heinrich et al. (2015).

The membership of Kikai Island remains highly controversial. The northern three communities of Kikai Island share the seven-vowel system with Amami Ōshima and Tokunoshima while the rest is grouped with Okinoerabu and Yoron for their five-vowel systems. For this reason, Nakamoto (1990) subdivided Kikai:

- Amami dialect
  - Northern Amami dialect
    - Northern Amami Ōshima
    - Southern Amami Ōshima
    - Northern Kikai
  - Southern Amami dialect
    - Southern Kikai
    - Okinoerabu
    - Yoron

Based on other evidence, however, Karimata (2000) tentatively grouped Kikai dialects together. Lawrence (2011) argued that lexical evidence supported the Kikai cluster although he refrained from determining its phylogenetic relationship with other Amami dialects.

As of 2014, Ethnologue presents another two-subdivision hypothesis: it groups Southern Amami, Northern Okinawa and Southern Okinawa to form Southern Amami–Okinawan, which is contrasted with Northern Amami–Okinawan. It also identifies Kikai as Northern Amami–Okinawan.

Heinrich et al. (2015) refers to the subdivisions of Northern Ryukyuan as only "Amami" and "Okinawan". There is a note that other languages, specifically within the Yaeyama language, should be recognized as independent due to mutual unintelligibility.
