= Tokunoshima =

Island within the Amami Islands of Japan

Native name: Tukunushima (徳之島)
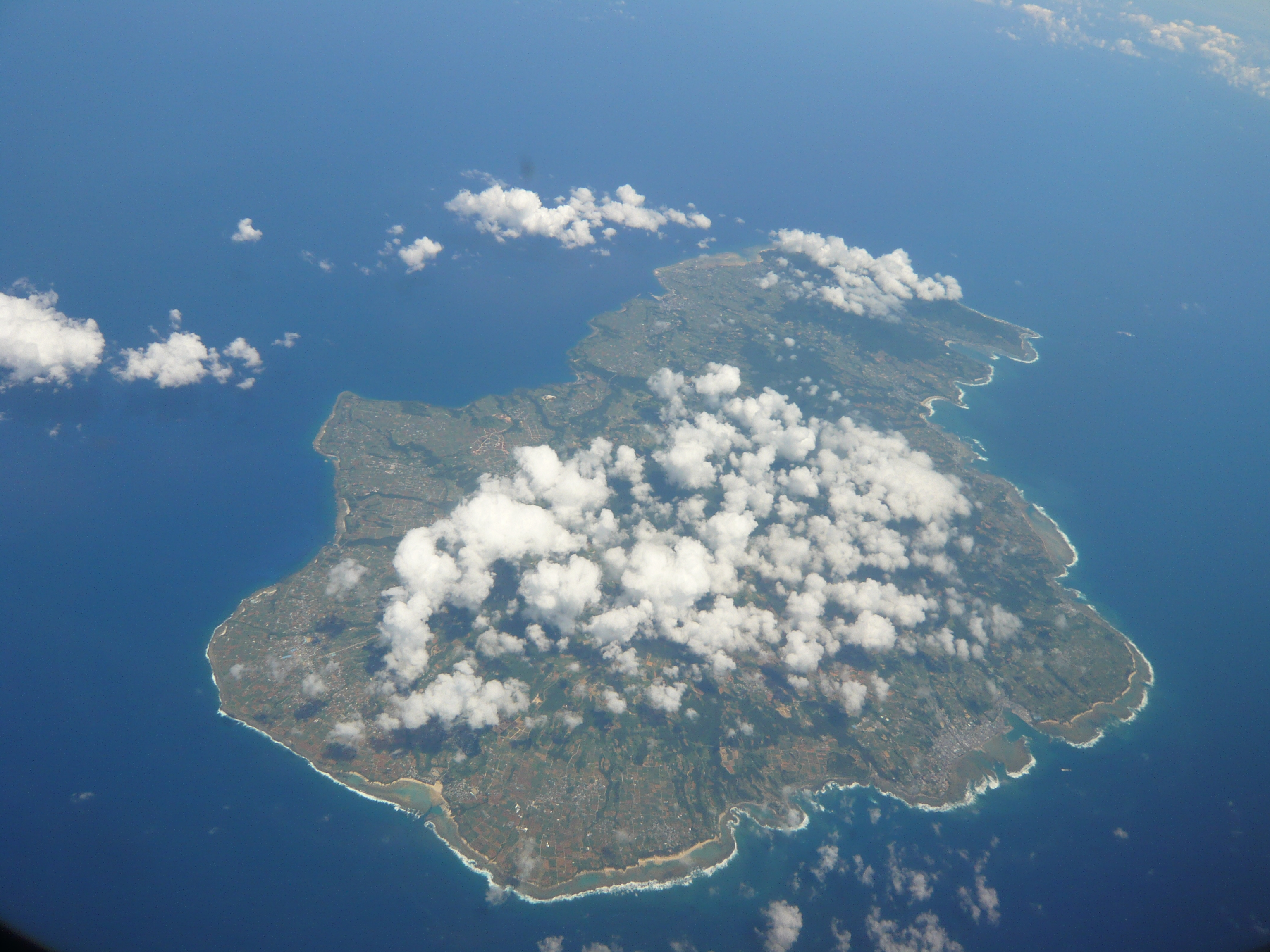
- Aerial view of the island. (2011)

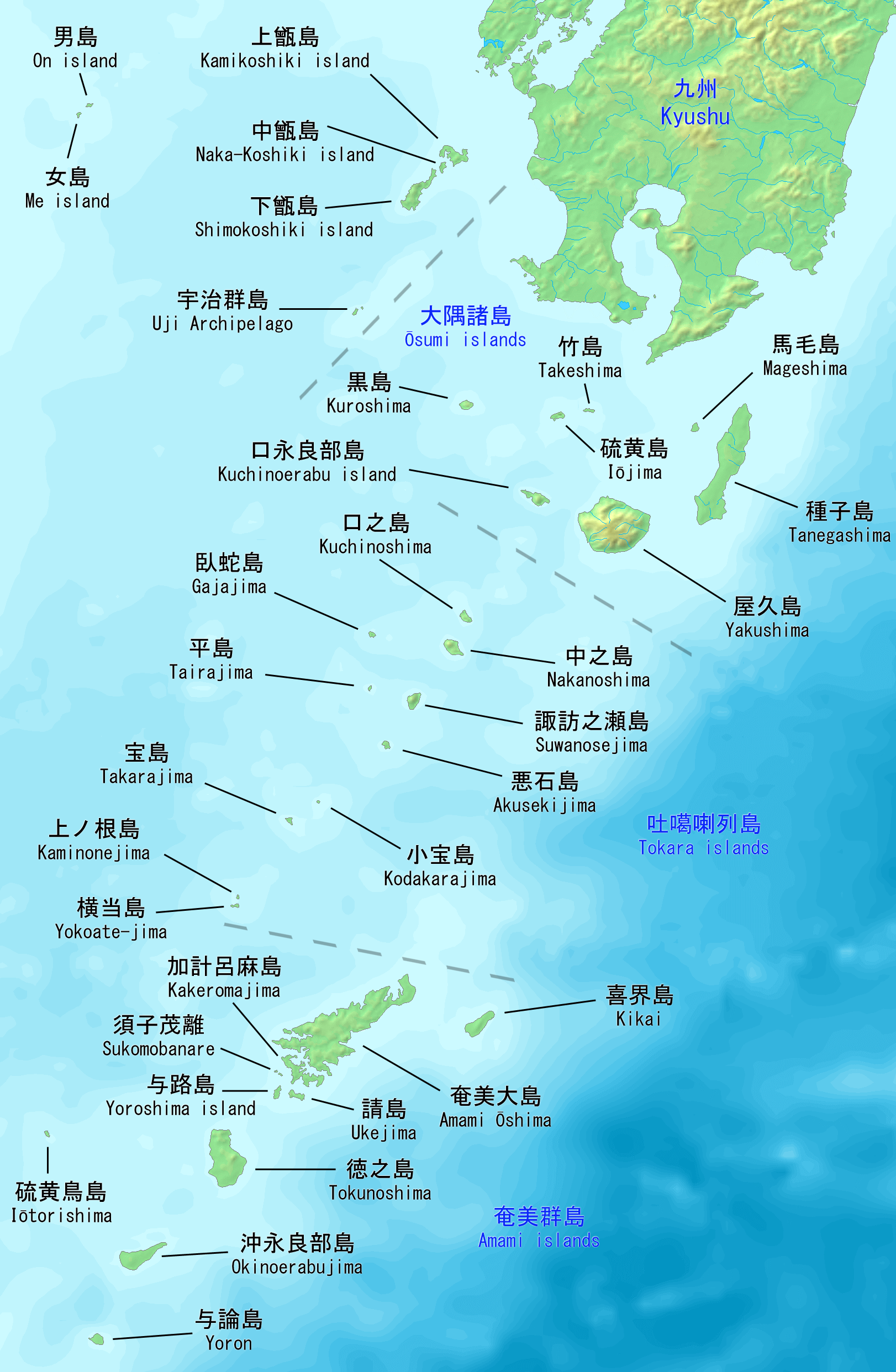

Geography
- Location: East China Sea
- Coordinates: 27°49′12″N 128°55′56″E
- Archipelago: Amami Islands
- Area: 247.77 km^{2} (95.66 sq mi)
- Length: 25 km (15.5 mi)
- Width: 18 km (11.2 mi)
- Coastline: 80 km (50 mi)
- Highest elevation: 645 m (2116 ft)
- Highest point: Inokawadake

Administration
- Japan
- Prefectures: Kagoshima Prefecture
- District: Ōshima District

Demographics
- Population: 27,000 (2013)
- Pop. density: 108.97/km^{2} (282.23/sq mi)
- Ethnic groups: Ryukyuan, Japanese

UNESCO World Heritage Site
- Part of: Amami-Ōshima Island, Tokunoshima Island, northern part of Okinawa Island, and Iriomote Island
- Criteria: Natural: x
- Reference: 1574-002
- Inscription: 2021 (44th Session)

Tokunoshima (Japanese: 徳之島; Tokunoshima: Tukunushima), or Tokuno Island, is an island in the Amami archipelago of the southern Satsunan Islands of Kagoshima Prefecture, Japan.

The island has a population of approximately 27,000 in an area od 247.85 km^{2} (95.70 sq mi). The island is divided into three administrative towns: Tokunoshima, Isen, and Amagi. The largest population centre on the island is the town of Kametsu, located along the eastern shore of the island within the administrative town of Tokunoshima. Much of the island is within the borders of Amami Guntō National Park.

The island is known for having the highest fertility rate in Japan (2.25 between 2018 and 2022) as well as a significant population of supercentenarians (people living beyond the age of 110).

== Geography ==
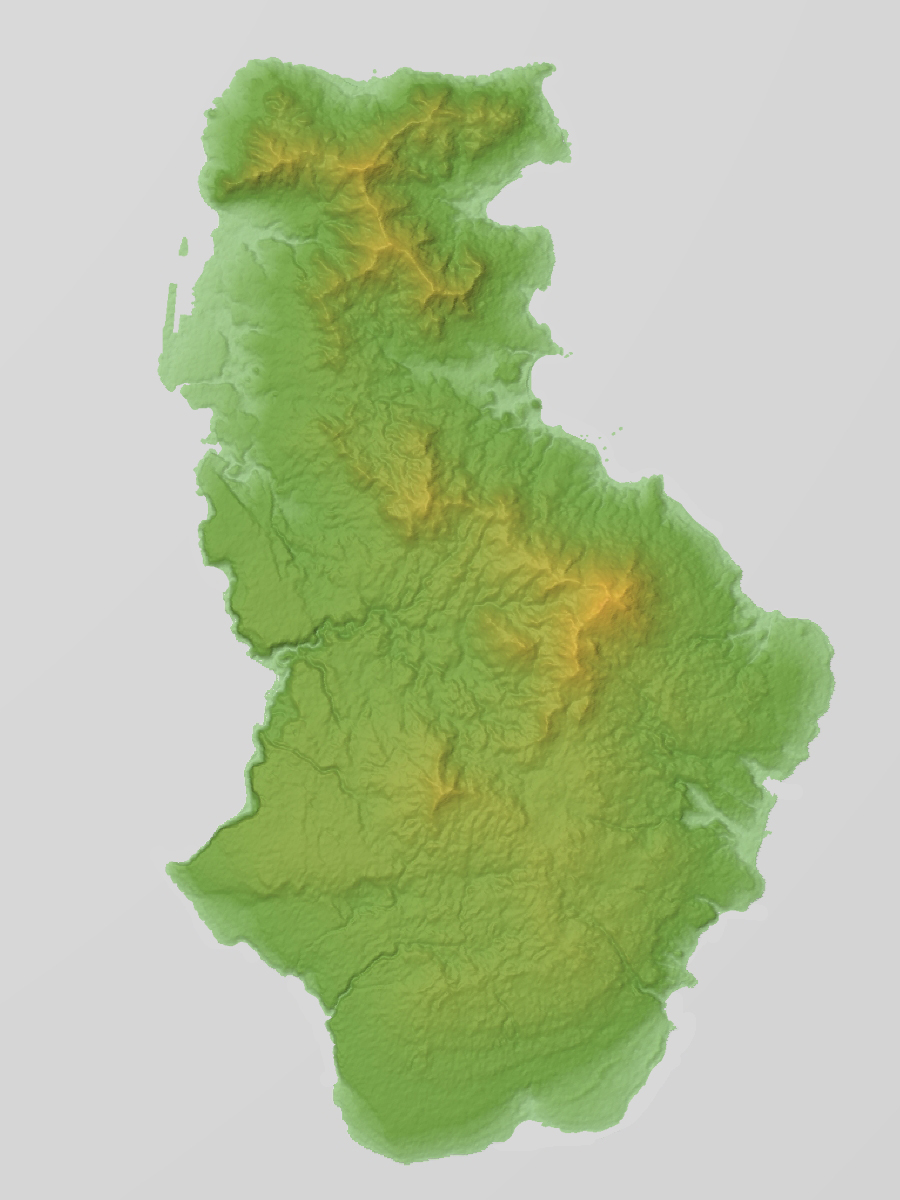
Tokunoshima relief map

Tokunoshima is the second largest island in the Amami Islands, after Amami Ōshima, and the 15th largest island in Japan. It is generally considered part of the Satsunan and Ryukyu archipelagos. Separated from the other Amami Islands, Tokunoshima lies halfway between Amami Ōshima and Okinoerabujima.

The volcanic Island measures approximately 25 kilometers (16 mi) by 18 kilometers (11 mi) at its widest point. Most of the administrative towns of Tokunoshima and Amagi are covered in mountains and rolling hills, with Mount Inokawadake at 645 meters (2,116 ft) above sea level as the island's highest peak. Mount Amagidake in the north has a height of 533 meters (1,749 ft). The administrative town of Isen along the southwestern slope of the island is flatter, with fertile soil suitable for agriculture. The coast of the island is largely rugged and rocky with areas of tall cliffs and small sandy beaches. The island is surrounded by a coral reef.

A series of large offshore rocks known as Tonbura Rocks are a prominent feature in the ocean off the northeastern coast of the island. The neighboring islands of Amami Ōshima, Kakeromajima, Yoroshima, Ukejima to the northeast and Okinoerabujima to the southwest are all visible from the island. On clear days, the twin volcanoes of Iōtorishima, in Okinawa Prefecture, can be seen to the west.

The island falls within a subtropical moist broadleaf forest ecoregion. Although Tokunoshima is subtropical, it receives sufficient rainfall that it has rainforests. Much of the island remains covered in laurel forests, although many areas have been extensively cleared for agriculture. There are many caves on the island, the longest of which measures 2,052 meters (6,732 ft) and is located in the area of Isen.

The climate of Tokunoshima is classified as a humid subtropical climate (Köppen climate classification Cfa) with very warm summers and mild winters. The rainy season lasts from May through September. The island is subject to frequent typhoons.

== Fauna ==
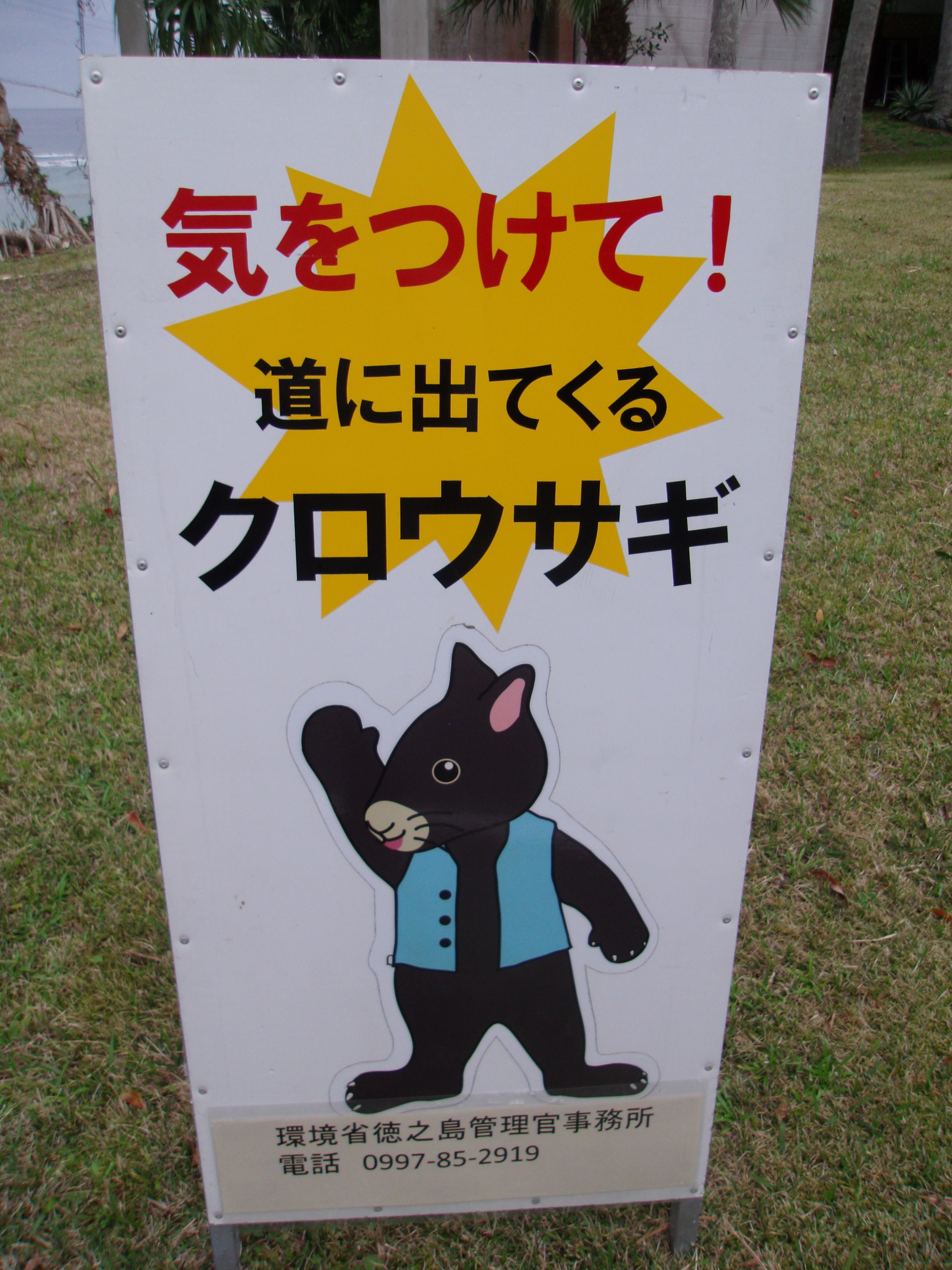
A sign warning of Amami rabbits crossing the road

Tokunoshima is home to several rare species endemic to the island itself or more generally to the Amami Islands. The Amami rabbit is found only on Tokunoshima and Amami Ōshima and is listed as endangered. The Amami rabbit is sometimes called a living fossil because it represents an ancient Asian lineage that has disappeared elsewhere. Also endangered is the Tokunoshima spiny rat, found only on the island. Several bird species endemic to Tokunoshima and Amami Ōshima, such as Lidth's jay, are also found. The island is also home to the venomous habu snake. The presence of habu has kept the forests on the island largely unvisited and more rugged areas relatively untouched.

== History ==
It is uncertain when Tokunoshima was first settled. It is mentioned in the ancient Japanese chronicle Nihon Shoki in the 720s.

Starting in the 11th century, Tokunoshima was the primary producer of a grey stoneware called Kamui ware that has been found in hundreds of archaeological sites throughout the Ryukyu Islands and southern Kyūshū. Several archaeological sites where Kamui ware was produced have been found on the island. These sites are now national historic sites.

Until 1624, Tokunoshima was part of the Ryukyu Kingdom. The island was invaded by samurai from Satsuma Domain in 1609 and its incorporation into the official holdings of that domain was recognized by the Tokugawa shogunate in 1624. Satsuma rule was harsh, with the inhabitants of the island reduced to serfdom and forced to raise sugar cane to meet high taxation, which often resulted in famine. In a famine in 1755, some 3000 islanders perished. Saigō Takamori was exiled to Tokunoshima in 1862 for less than two months, before he was resentenced to harsher conditions on Okinoerabujima.

After the Meiji Restoration, Tokunoshima was incorporated into Ōsumi Province and later became part of Kagoshima Prefecture. Following World War II, with the other Amami Islands, it was occupied by the United States until 1953, at which time it reverted to the control of Japan.

In 2006, an agreement was drafted to allow the United States to relocate Marine Corps Air Station Futenma to Tokunoshima. In 2010, reports emerged that Prime Minister Yukio Hatoyama's government had decided to resolve outstanding disputes regarding the agreement, leading to widespread protests and opposition from local officials. A protest against this plan drew over 10,000 people, nearly half of the island's population.

== Culture ==
Tokunoshima has a culture that reflects a mix of Japanese and Ryukyuan influences, with much influence from the neighboring Amami islands and from Okinawa to the south. The local cuisine of the island combines standard Japanese fare with Okinawan dishes such as goya chanpurū. A popular musical instrument on the island is the sanshin, an Okinawan relative of the Japanese shamisen, and the Okinawan folk dance eisa is practiced.

The indigenous language of the island, the Ryukyuan language called Tokunoshima, is known on the island as sïmagucï or, in Japanese, shimaguchi ("island language"). However, the language has now largely been supplanted by Japanese. The Tokunoshima words for "thank you," oboradaren (Tokunoshima and Amagi towns) and oboradanii (Isen town) are widely known even among Japanese speakers.

Tokunoshima is known for tōgyū, a Japanese style of bullfighting in which human coaches encourage bulls with locked horns to push each other out of a ring. Tōgyū is a major event on the island and much of the island's culture revolves around the bullfights. Because of the importance of tōgyū, Tokunoshima's mascot and main icon is a tōgyū bull.

== Economy ==
The economy of the island revolves around agriculture, primarily the growth of sugar cane. Sweet potatoes, rice, ginger, and tropical fruit, such as mangoes, papaya, and bananas, are also grown. Sugar cane is processed at several factories into brown sugar and at several distilleries into brown sugar shōchū. Commercial fishing is also important, as is tourism and some light manufacturing.

== Transportation ==
The port of Kametoku, located adjacent to Kametsu in the administrative town of Tokunoshima, has regular ferry service to the towns of Naze on Amami and Wadomari on Okinoerabu. From Amami, the ferry continues to Kagoshima. From Okinoerabu, the ferry continues to Yoron and Okinawa. Ferries exist to Kobe as well. The smaller port of Hetono, in the town of Amagi, has ferries to Kagoshima and to Setouchi on Amami. When waves are too strong on the Pacific side of the island, where Kametoku is located, the Kametoku ferries will instead dock at Hetono port. Small ports primarily used by fishing or sightseeing boats exist elsewhere along the shoreline.

Tokunoshima Airport, located in Amagi, is connected to Kagoshima, Amami, and Okinoerabu (with the flight continuing to Okinawa) by Japan Airlines and Japan Air Commuter.

The main highway on the island is Kagoshima Prefecture Highway 80, which traverses the island from Tokunoshima Airport and Amagi to Kametsu and then follows the southeastern coast of the island to Isen. From Isen, Highway 83 crosses the southeast area of the island to Amagi. Highway 629 follows the northern coast of the island from Tokunoshima Airport to the village of Kedoku. Highway 617 is an inland route between Kametsu and the village of Itokina, while Highway 618 connects Kedoku to the village of Matsubara through the village of Todoroki.

== Notable landmarks ==
Mushiroze, on the island's north coast, contains large granite slabs which have been shaped by wind and waves. The area is named for the way the flat stone slabs resemble mushiro, a Japanese term for woven straw mats.

Cape Inutabu, the westernmost point of the island, features a panoramic ocean view and a memorial, built in April 1968, to the Japanese battleship Yamato and her escorts, which were sunk near Tokunoshima during the final stages of World War II. A memorial service is held annually on April 7.

Much of the island is included within Amami Guntō National Park, established in 2017 to replace Amami Guntō Quasi-National Park, established in 1974.
