= Yoron =

Yoron may refer to:

- Yoronjima, Yorontō, or Yoron Island (与論島), part of Amami Islands in Kagoshima Prefecture, Japan
- Yoron, Kagoshima (与論町, Yoronchō), the town that makes up the island
- the Yoron language of Yoronjima
