= Amami Guntō National Park =

Japanese national park

- 奄美群島国立公園
- IUCN category II (national park)
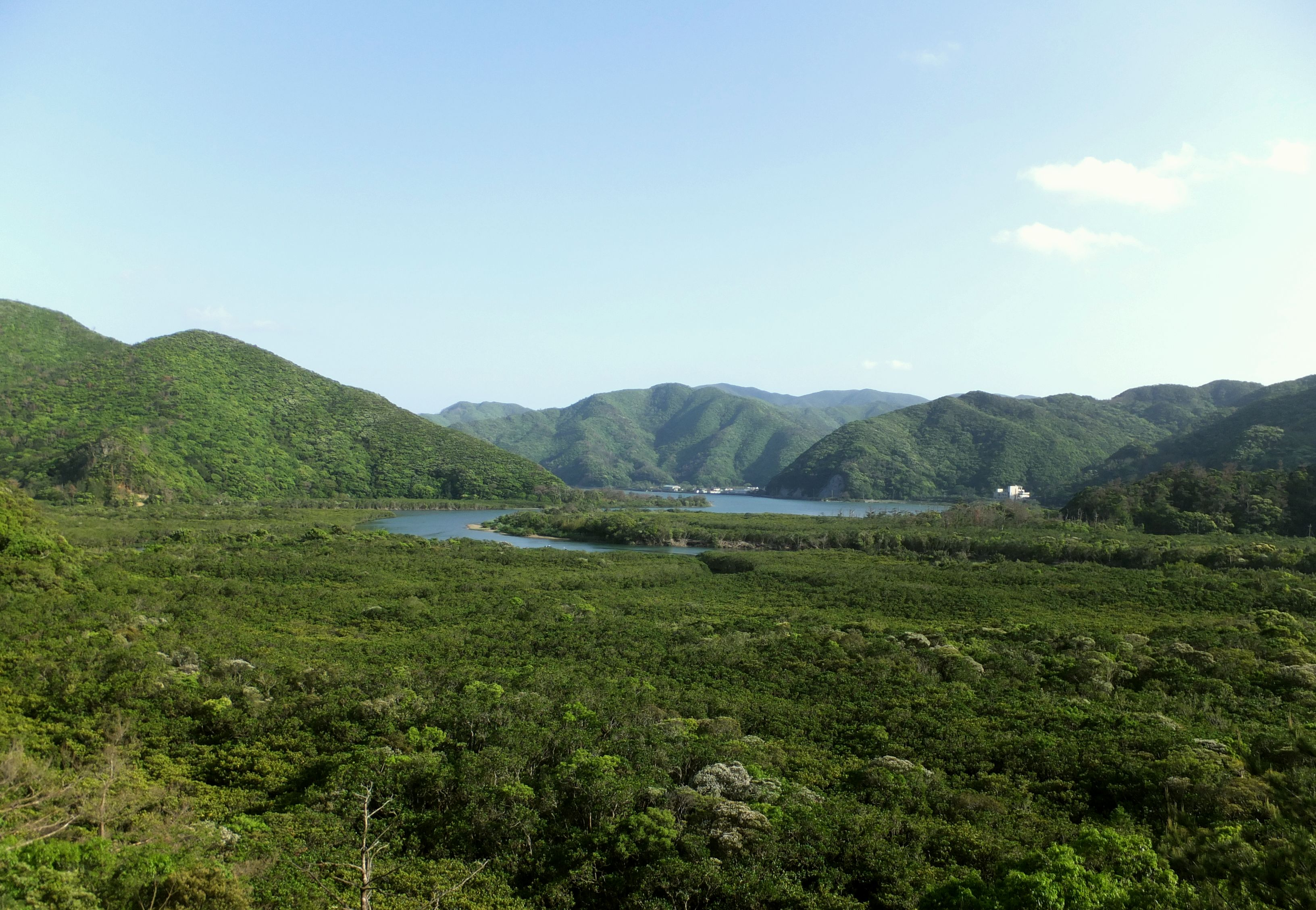
- Mangrove forest in Amami Guntō National Park
- Location of Amami Guntō National Park
- Location: Japan: Amami Islands, Kagoshima
- Nearest city: Amami
- Coordinates: 27°46′48″N 128°54′54″E
- Area: 75,263 ha (185,980 acres) (land: 42,181 ha, water: 33,082 ha)
- Established: March 7, 2017
- Governing body: Ministry of the Environment (Japan)

Amami Guntō National Park (奄美群島国立公園, Amami Guntō Kokuritsu Kōen) is a national park in Kagoshima Prefecture, Japan. Established in 2017, the park comprises a land area of 42,181 ha (104,230 acres) and a sea area of 33,082 ha (81,750 acres). The national park includes areas of these islands: Tokunoshima, Kikai, Amami, Yoron, Okinoerabujima, Uke Island, Kakeromajima and Yoroshima.

== History ==
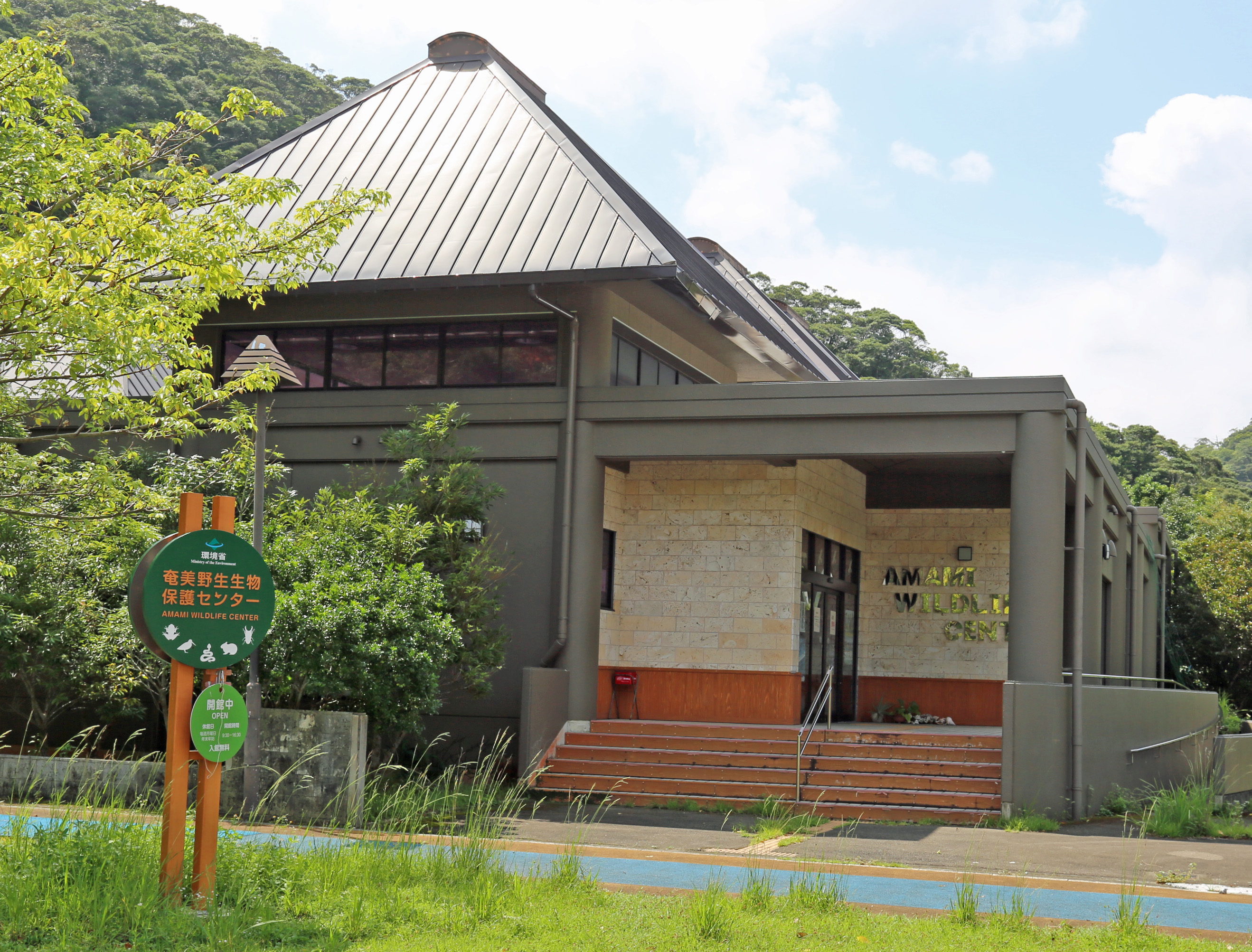
Amami Wildlife Center

On 15 February 1974 the Amami Guntō Quasi-National Park was founded on Amami Ōshima. On 7 March 2017 the Amami Guntō National Park was established and it subsumed the former Amami Guntō Quasi-National Park. The Amami Guntō National Park includes parts of the municipalities of Amagi, Amami, China, Isen, Kikai, Setouchi, Tatsugō, Tokunoshima, Uken, Wadomari, Yamato, and Yoron.

The designation of the new National Park, alongside that of Yanbaru National Park, is part of the movement to have Amami-Oshima Island, Tokunoshima Island, the northern part of Okinawa Island and Iriomote Island inscribed on the UNESCO World Heritage List.

The Amami Wildlife Center is managed by Japan's Ministry of the Environment to protect and preserve the natural ecosystem of the Amami Islands.

== Geography ==
Area map of Amami Guntō National Park. Clockwise from the upper left, Tokunoshima, Kikai, Amami, Yoron, Okinoerabujima. Land area Sea area

Total designated area is 75,263 ha (185,980 acres) (land: 42,181 ha, water: 33,082 ha). It is a World Heritage Site candidate. The national park consists of areas from these islands: Tokunoshima, Kikai, Amami, Yoron, Okinoerabujima, Uke Island, Kakeromajima and Yoroshima.

== Flora and fauna ==
This national park features coral reefs, mangrove forests and tidal flats. A unique ecosystem has developed with endemic species such as the Amami rabbit, Ryukyu spiny rat, birds: Amami's jay, Ryukyu robin. There are also snakes such as Habu and amphibians such as: Ishikawa's frog, Japanese warty newt and the Ryūkyū scops owl.

=== Amami Ōshima, Kakeromajima ===
Yuwandake is covered with subtropical hardwood forests such as Castanopsis sieboldii and Neolitsea aciculata and it has valuable vegetation. There are coral reefs, mangrove forests at the mouth of the Katsushi River and underwater scenery.

=== Kikaijima ===
Noticeable coastal terraces are distributed on the islands. Hyakunodai Park is a plateau where coral reefs have developed.

=== Tokunoshima ===
This is a limestone island with a Karst topography. There is a natural Sea cave created by erosion. Mt. Inokawa is known as a treasure of endemic plants including ferns.

=== Okinoerabujima ===
There are large-scale caves such as the Shoryu Cavern and a water tunnel. Sea cliffs developed in the area of Minamata and Kunigamizaki.

=== Yoronjima ===
The entire coast is designated as part of the national park except for the area around Yoron Airport. Coral reefs surround the island.

== Gallery ==
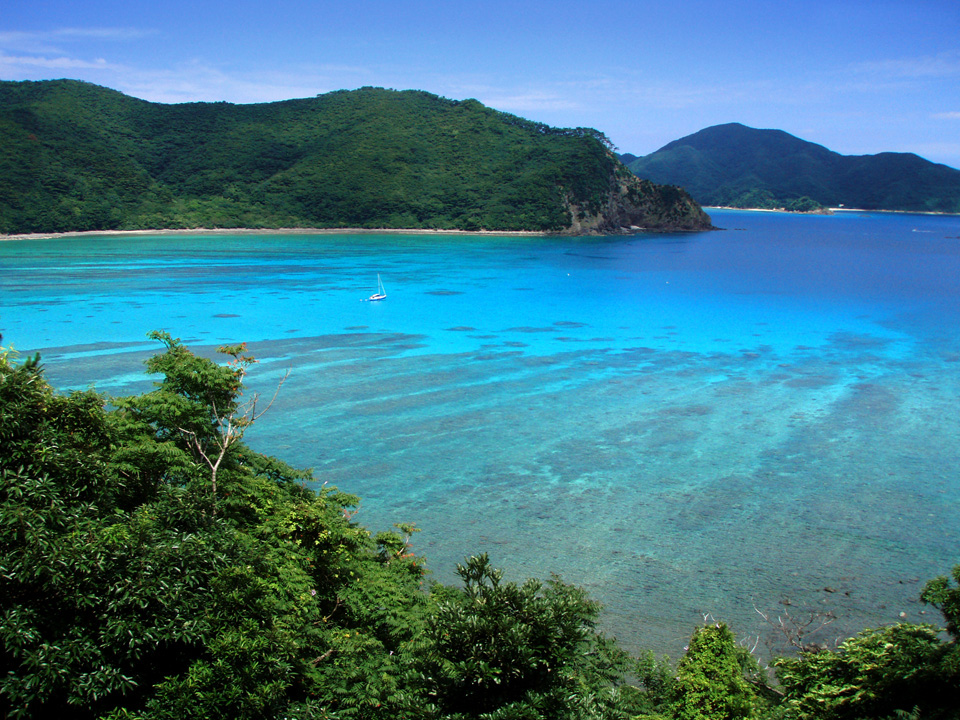
View of Katetsu Bay from nearby Manenzaki lookout point in Amami Ōshima.

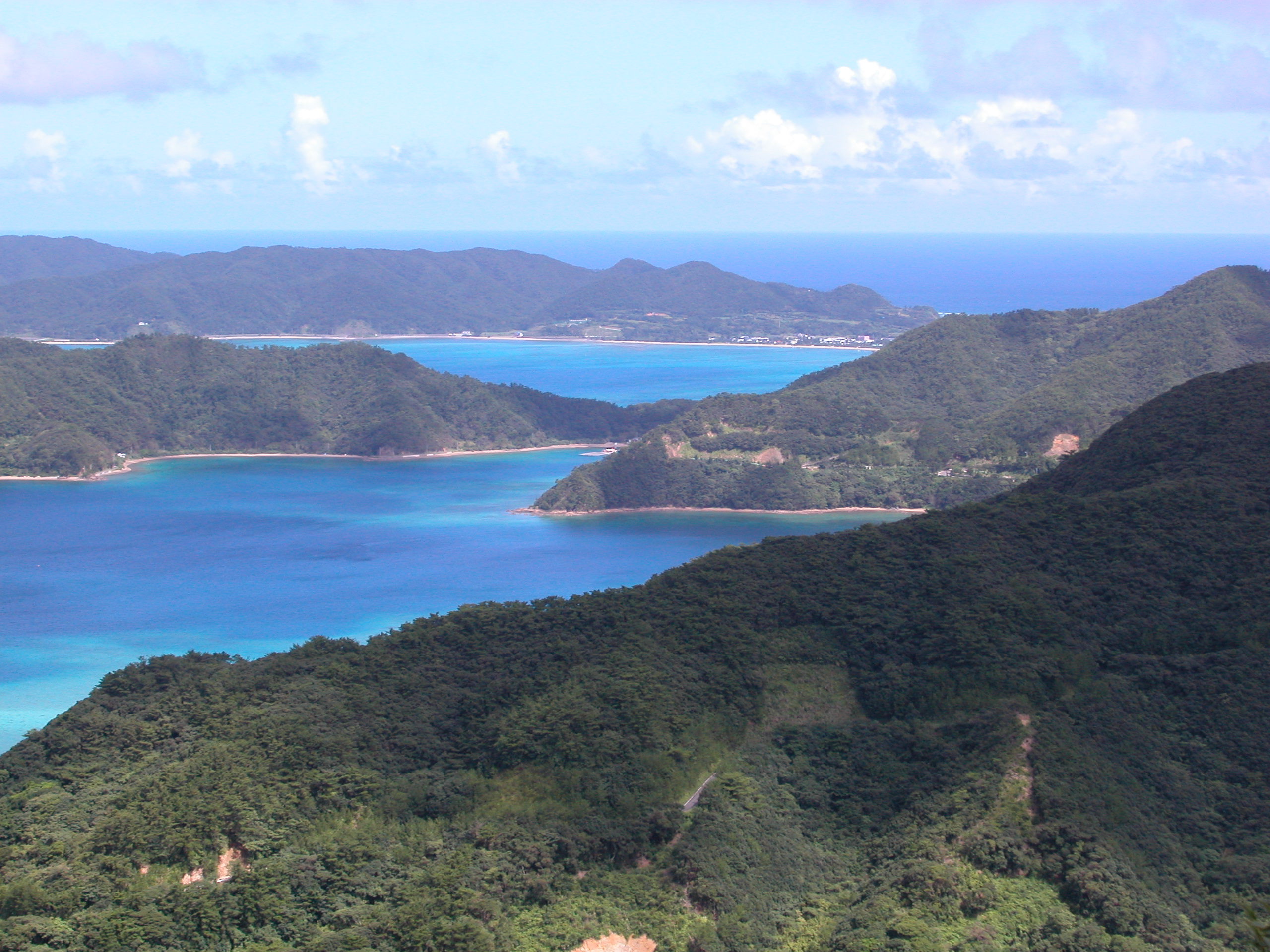
Coastal area of Amami Ōshima

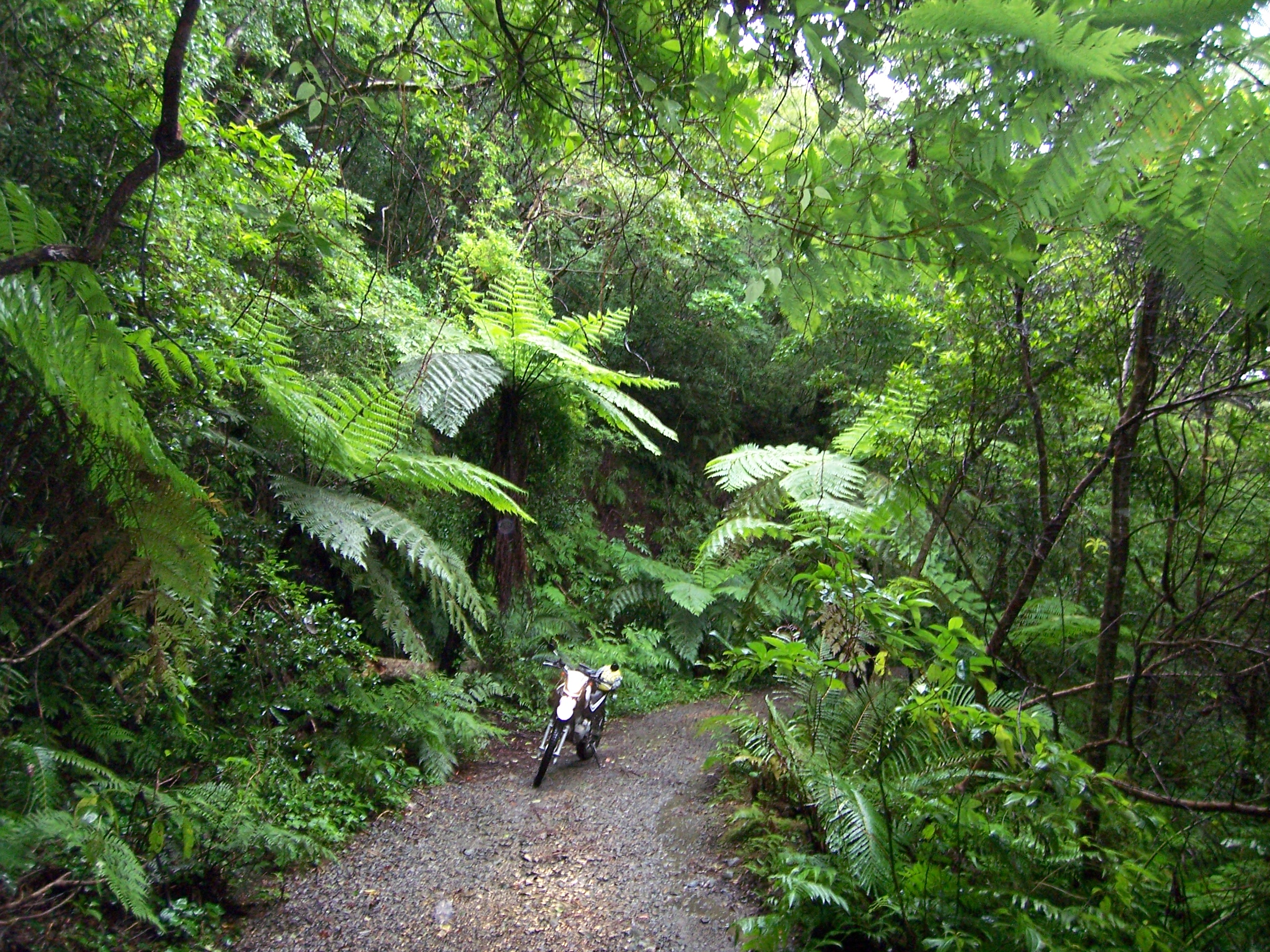
Kinsakubaru wildwood in Amami Ōshima

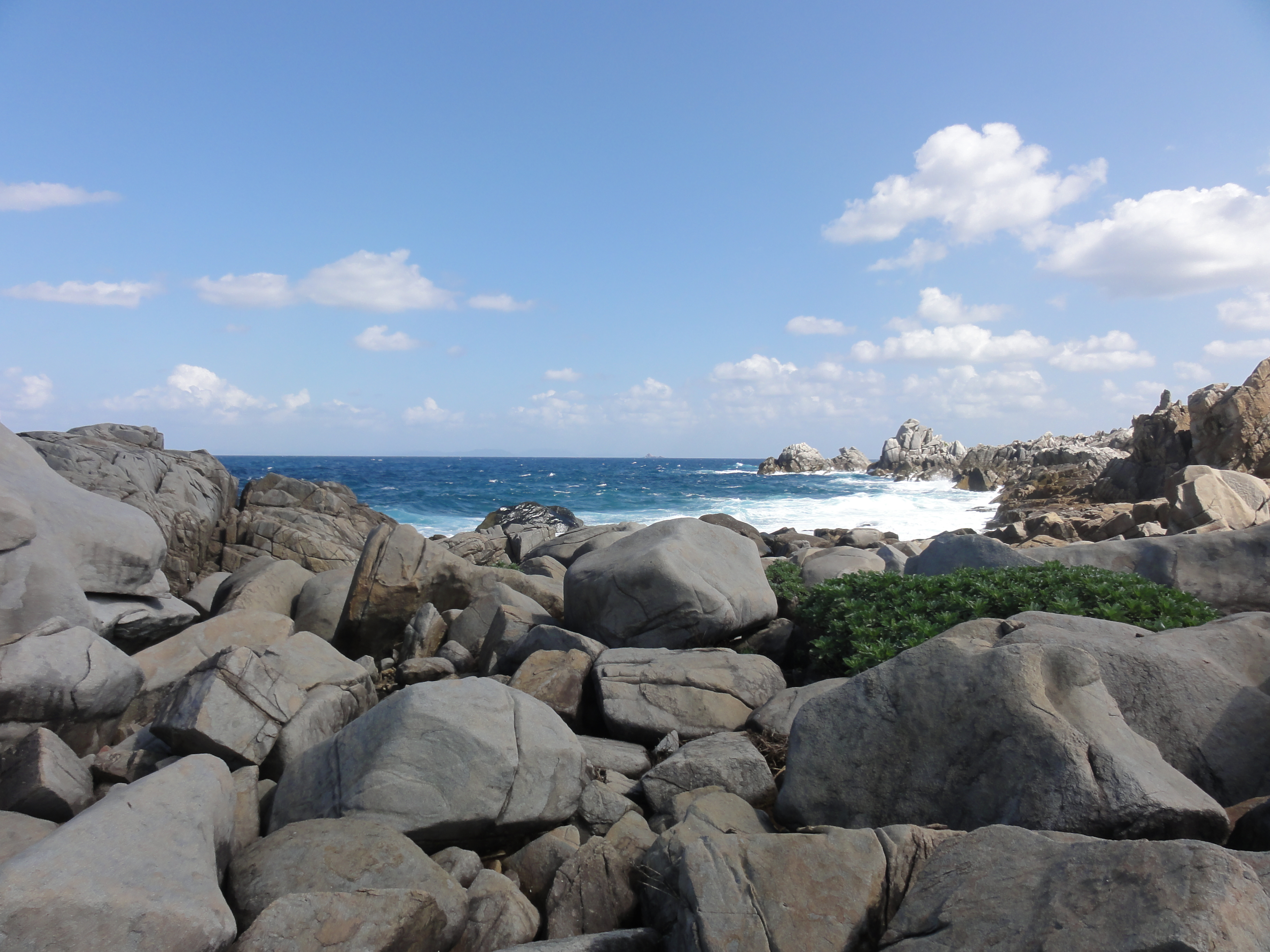
View from Tokunoshima

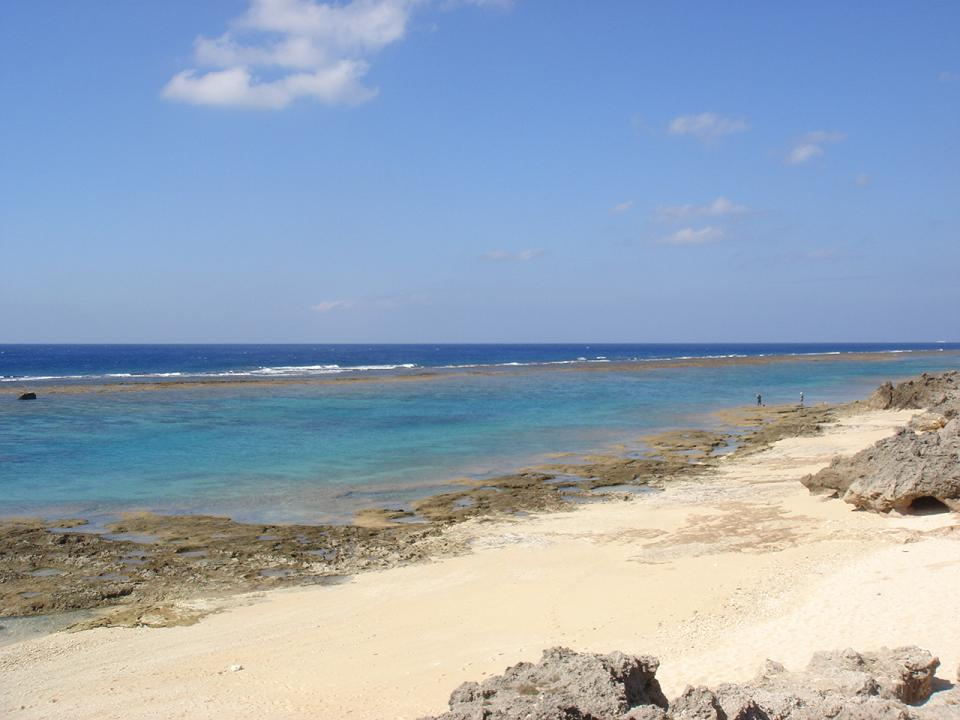
A beach on Okinoerabujima

== See also ==
- List of national parks of Japan
- List of World Heritage Sites in Japan
- Amami rabbit
- Amami Ōshima
