= Tokunoshima language =

Dialect cluster of Northern Ryukyuan

Tokunoshima
- シマユミィタ; Shimayumiita
- Native to: Japan
- Region: Tokunoshima of the Amami Islands, Kagoshima Prefecture
- Native speakers: 5,100 (2004)
- Language family: Japonic: Ryukyuan; Northern Ryukyuan; Amami; Ōshima–Tokunoshima; Tokunoshima
- Writing system: Japanese

Language codes
- ISO 639-3: tkn
- Glottolog: toku1246 Toku-No-Shima

The Tokunoshima language (シマグチ (島口) Shimaguchi or シマユミィタ Shimayumiita), also Toku-no-Shima, is a dialect cluster spoken on Tokunoshima, Kagoshima Prefecture of southwestern Japan. It is part of the Amami–Okinawan languages, which are part of the Japonic languages.

== Dialects ==
Okamura (2007) posits two divisions of Tokunoshima: Kametsu–Amagi in the north and Isen in the south. Kametsu is the traditional politico-cultural center of the island. It has been a center of distributions of new lexical traits, some of which were not confined in Tokunoshima Town but spread to Amagi Town in the northeast and, less frequently, to Isen. The dialects of Isen are considered more conservative by the speakers.

== Folk terminology ==
According to Okamura Takahiro (b. 1936 in Asama, Amagi Town), the speakers of Tokunoshima call their tongues sïmagucï, which consists of two morphemes. The first part sïma (Standard Japanese shima) refers to an island both in Standard Japanese and Tokunoshima but it also means (one's own) local community in Tokunoshima and other Amami dialects. The second part kucï (Standard Japanese kuchi) means a mouth, and by extension, speech. Hence, sïmagucï refers to the speech of one's own community and of the island as a whole. Note that sïmagucï is more strongly associated with the former because the speakers of Tokunoshima are fully aware that each shima has a distinct language.

== Phonology ==
The following is the phonology of the Kametsu dialect, which is based on Hirayama et al. (1986).

=== Consonants ===
As with most Ryukyuan languages to the north of Central Okinawan, stops are described as "plain" C’ and "glottalized" C‘. Phonetically, the two series are lightly aspirated [Cʰ] and tenuis [C˭], respectively.

Consonant phonemes
	Bilabial			Alveolar			Post- alveolar			Palatal	Velar			Glottal	Moraic
Nasal		mˀ	m		nˀ	n									Q N
Stop	pʰ		b	tʰ	t˭	d					kʰ	k˭	ɡ	ʔ	Q N
Affricate							t͡ʃʰ	t͡ʃ˭	dz						Q N
Fricative				s										h	Q N
Approximant										j			w		Q N
Flap									r						Q N

Notes

- The zero onset /'/ may be added. It is contrasted with glottal /h/ and /ʔ/.
- /h/ is [ç] before /i/ and /j/, and [ɸ] before /u/ and /w/.
- /pʰ/ is new and infrequent.
- /si/, /t͡ʃʰɨ/ and /t͡ʃ˭ɨ/ are realized as [ʃɪ], [t͡sʰɨ] and [t͡sɨ], respectively.
- /dz/ is [d͡z] before /ɨ/ and /ɘ/, and [d͡ʒ] elsewhere.
- [ʃa], [ʃe], [ʃu] and [ʃo] are phonemically analyzed as /sja/, /sje/, /sju/ and /sjo/, respectively.
- [t͡ʃʰa], [t͡ʃʰe], [t͡ʃʰu] and [t͡ʃʰo] are phonemically analyzed as /t͡ʃʰja/, /t͡ʃʰje/, /t͡ʃʰju/ and /t͡ʃʰjo/, respectively.
- [t͡ʃa], [t͡ʃu] and [t͡ʃo] are phonemically analyzed as /t͡ʃ˭ja/, /t͡ʃ˭ju/ and /t͡ʃ˭jo/, respectively.

=== Vowels ===
Vowel phonemes
	Front	Central	Back
Close	i	ɨ	u
Mid	e	ə	o
Open		a	

Notes

- The exact quality of /ə/ is debated, with some analyzing it as a front-mid /ɛ/.

=== Correspondences to Standard Japanese ===
Only major sound correspondences are listed.

- Standard Japanese /e/ mostly corresponds to /ɨ/.
- Standard Japanese /o/ is merged into /u/.
- Tokunoshima /e/, /ɘ/ and /o/ are of secondary origin and mostly correspond to Standard Japanese diphthongs.
- Standard Japanese /hi/ and /he/ corresponds to Tokunoshima /sɨ/ and /hwɨ/, respectively.
- Standard Japanese /si/ and /zu/, /zi/ and /zu/, and /t͡ʃi/ and /t͡ʃu/ are merged into /sɨ/, /zɨ/, and /t͡ʃɨ/, respectively.
- The fusion of two consecutive morae resulted in glottalized consonants in Tokunoshima.

== Vocabulary ==
The forms given below are from the southern Isen dialect containing the villages of Higashihama, Kenbuku, and Uemonawa.

=== Pronouns ===
Pronouns
		1st person	2nd person	
		1st person	Polite	Non-Polite
Singular	Non-fusional	wan / wa	uri	ura
Singular	Fusional	waa	uri	uraa
Dual	Non-fusional	wanten	urinten	uranten
Dual	Fusional	wattari	urinten	uranten
Plural	Non-fusional	waakya	uri-taa	ura-taa
Plural	Fusional	wakkya	ukkya	

Personal pronouns in Tokunoshima are only used for the 1st and 2nd person referents; demonstrative pronouns are used for 3rd person referents. Non-fusional forms of pronouns are followed by case-marking suffixes, while fusional forms are not suffixed and stand as independent topical subjects of clauses. The 'bare' form of the 1st person non-fusional singular, wa, is used before the nominative particle -ga.

=== Numerals ===
Numerals 1-10
Number	Cardinal	Iterative	Personal	Prefix
1	tˀin	tˀyukeeri	tˀyuuri	tˀyu-
2	tˀaacï	tˀakeeri	tˀaari	tˀa-
3	miicï	mikeeri	mityaari	mi-
4	yuucï	yukeeri	yutaari	yu-
5	icïcï	ityukeeri	(gonin)	icï-
6	muucï	(rokkai)	(rokunin)	mu-
7	nanacï	(nanakai)	(nananin/sityinin)	nana-
8	yaacï	(hatyikai)	(hatyinin)	ya-
9	kuunucï	(kyuukai)	(kyuunin)	(kyuu)-
10	tuu	(zyukkai)	(zyuunin)	(zyuu)-

Forms in parentheses in the table above are Japanese or Sino-Japanese in origin. Cardinal forms are used in counting non-human entities, iterative for frequencies of events. Personal for counting people. Prefix forms are applied to some non-human nouns, e.g. t˭yu-uban for 'one night.' When referring to numbers as abstract mathematical concepts, Sino-Japanese words are used.

== Sources ==
- Tokunoshima hōgen jiten (2014) by Okamura Takahiro, Sawaki Motoei, Nakajima Yumi, Fukushima Chitsuko and Kikuchi Satoru. Based on Okamura's Asama dialect.
