= Setoguchi =

Setoguchi (瀬戸口) is a Japanese surname, meaning "mouth (口) of the channel (瀬戸)". People with this surname include:

- Devin Setoguchi (born 1987), Canadian former ice hockey player
- Kozue Setoguchi (瀬戸口 梢; born 1991), Japanese footballer
- Mitsuki Setoguchi (瀬戸口 心月; born 2005), Japanese idol
- Tokichi Setoguchi (瀬戸口 藤吉; 1868–1941), Japanese composer and conductor

Fictional characters with this surname include:

- Hina Setoguchi, a main character in 2016 Japanese animated film Suki ni Naru Sono Shunkan o

== See also ==
- Setoguchi Station, railway station in Seto, Aichi Prefecture, Japan
- Setouchi (disambiguation), also a Japanese surname and placename
- 58622 Setoguchi, minor planet discovered in 1997
