= Ikue =

- Gender: Female

Origin
- Origin: Japanese
- Meaning: Different meanings depending on the kanji used

Ikue (written: 育江, 育恵, 郁恵, 郁絵 or いくえ in hiragana) is a feminine Japanese given name. Notable people with the name include:

- Ikue Asazaki (朝崎 郁恵; born 1935), Japanese singer
- Ikue Kitazawa (北澤 育恵; born 1996), Japanese curler
- Ikue Mori (もり いくえ; born 1953), Japanese musician
- Ikue Ōtani (大谷 育江; born 1965), Japanese actress and voice actress
- Ikue Sakakibara (榊原 郁恵; born 1959), Japanese actress and singer
- Ikue Teshigawara (勅使川原 郁恵; born 1978), Japanese speed skater

== See also ==
- International Union of Catholic Esperantists
