= SVB =

SVB may refer to:

== Groups, organizations, companies ==
- Städtische Verkehrsbetriebe Bern, a public transport operator in Bern, Switzerland
- Surinaamse Voetbal Bond, the governing body of soccer football in Suriname
  - SVB Cup, Surinamese soccer competition
- Silicon Valley Bank, a commercial bank in the United States that failed in 2023
  - SVB Securities, an investment bank
  - SVB Financial Group, a holding company

== People, personalities ==
- Shane Van Boening, an American professional pool player

== Other uses ==
- Setouchi Volcanic Belt, a Miocene volcanic belt in southwestern Japan
- Ulau-Suain language of Papua New Guinea (ISO 639-3 code: svb)
- Polikarpov SVB, a Soviet aircraft
- Shavenbaby (svb), a fly gene encoding a transcription factor for making hair

== See also ==
- Silicon Valley BART extension, rapid transit system in California
- Sri Venkateswara Bhakti Channel, a Telegu language Hindu devotional TV channel
- sub (disambiguation)
