= Setouchi =

Setouchi may refer to:

== Places ==
- Setouchi, Kagoshima, a town on Amami Islands, Japan
- Setouchi, Okayama, a city on Honshū, Japan
- Setouchi region, a region of Japan encompassing the Seto Inland Sea and adjacent coastal areas of Honshū, Shikoku, and Kyushu

== People ==
- Jakucho Setouchi (1922–2021), Japanese Buddhist nun

== Other ==
- Setouchi Volcanic Belt, a Miocene volcanic belt in southwestern Japan
- Setouchi Junior College, a private junior college in Mitoyo, Kagawa, Japan
- TV Setouchi, a television station in Okayama Prefecture and Kagawa Prefecture, Japan
