= Yoron, Kagoshima =

Yoron 与論町 Yunnu / Yunnuu
- Town
- Yoron Town
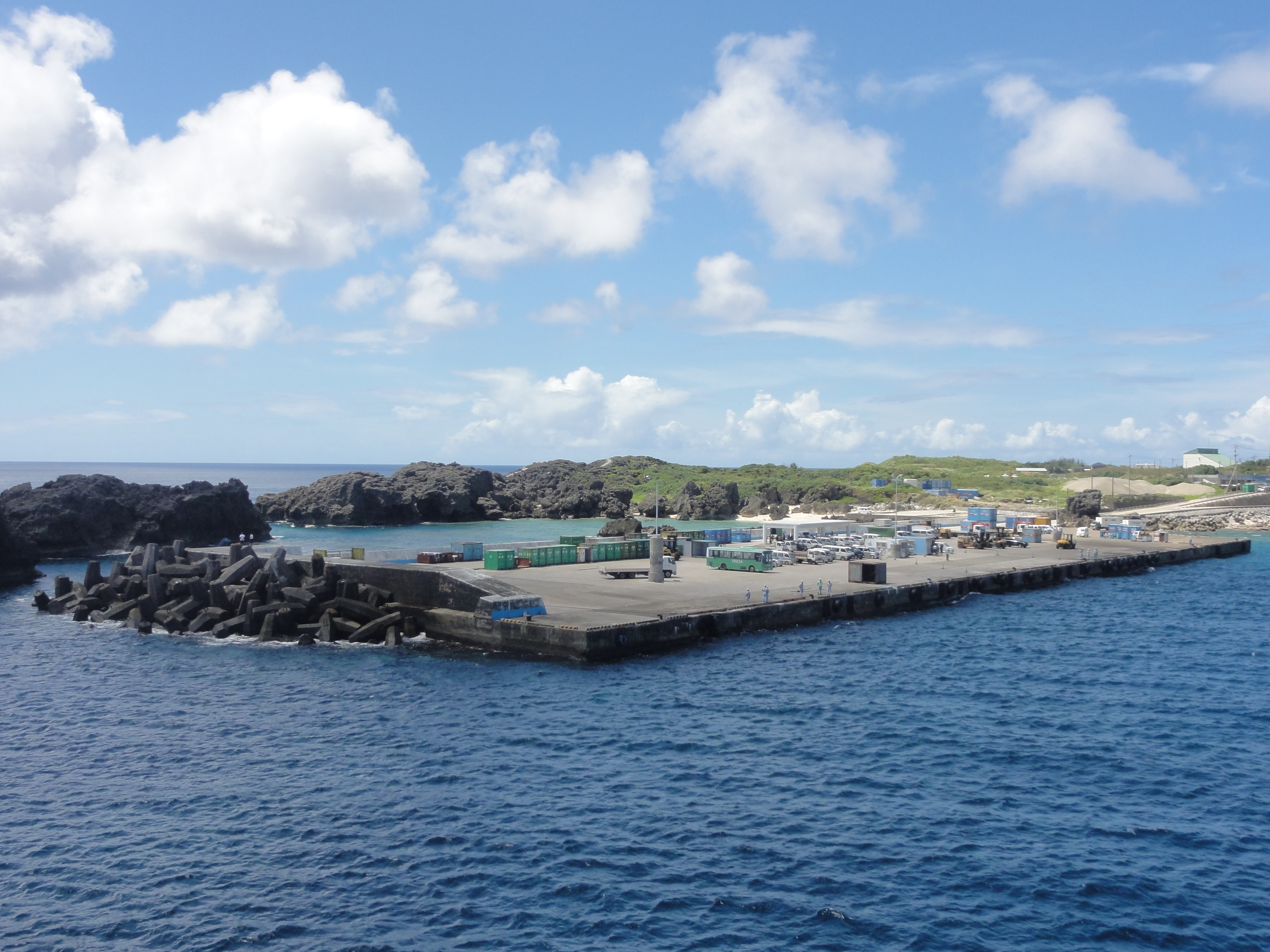
- Yoron Port

- Flag Seal

- Location of Yoron in Kagoshima Prefecture

- Coordinates: 27°2′34″N 128°25′40″E
- Country: Japan
- Region: Kyushu (Amami Islands)
- Prefecture: Kagoshima Prefecture
- District: Ōshima

Government
  - -Mayor: Seigo Minami

Area
  - Total: 20.49 km^{2} (7.91 sq mi)

Population (October 1, 2020)
  - Total: 5,115
  - Density: 250/km^{2} (650/sq mi)
- Time zone: UTC+9 (Japan Standard Time)
- Tree: Banyan and Kuroki (Symplocos)
- -Flower: Hibiscus
- Phone number: 0997-97-3111
- Address: 32-1 Chabana, Yoron-chō, Ōshima-gun, Kagoshima-ken 891-9301
- Website: www.yoron.jp

Yoron (Japanese: 与論町, Hepburn: Yoron cho; Yoron: Yunnu / Yunnuu) is a town located on Yoronjima, in Ōshima District, Kagoshima Prefecture, Japan.

As of October 2020, the town has an estimated population of 5,115 and a population density of 250 persons per km^{2}. The total area is 20.49 km^{2}. Much of the island is within the boundaries of the Amami Guntō National Park.

== Geography ==
Yoron occupies the entire island of Yoronjima, in the Amami archipelago of the Satsunan Islands, and administratively borders Okinawa Prefecture.

== Climate ==
The climate is classified as humid subtropical (Köppen climate classification Cfa) with very warm summers and mild winters. Precipitation is high throughout the year, but is highest in the months of May, June and September. The area is subject to frequent typhoons.

== History ==
On April 1, 1908, Yoronshima was administratively divided into six villages. From February 28, 1946, until December 25, 1953, Yoronshima, along with the other Amami Islands, was administered by the United States. The six villages were merged to form the town of Yoron on January 1, 1963. Proposals to merge Yoronshima with China and Wadomari on the neighboring island of Okinoerabujima in 2003 were overwhelmingly rejected by voters on both islands.

== Transportation ==
Yoron Airport (IATA: RNJ; ICAO: RORY) serves travellers to and from the island. Japan Air Commuter flies to Kagoshima and Okinoerabu Airports, and Ryukyu Air Commuter provides service to Naha Airport.

There is a regular ferry service from Yoron Port to Kagoshima, Kobe, Okinawa, and the surrounding Amami Islands.

== Education ==
Kagoshima Prefecture operates Kagoshima Prefectural Yoron High School.

The municipality's Yoron Town Board of Education operates Yoron Junior High School (JA) and three elementary schools: Chahana (茶花小学校), Nama (JA), and Yoron (与論小学校).

== Sister cities ==
- Mykonos, Greece, since 1985
