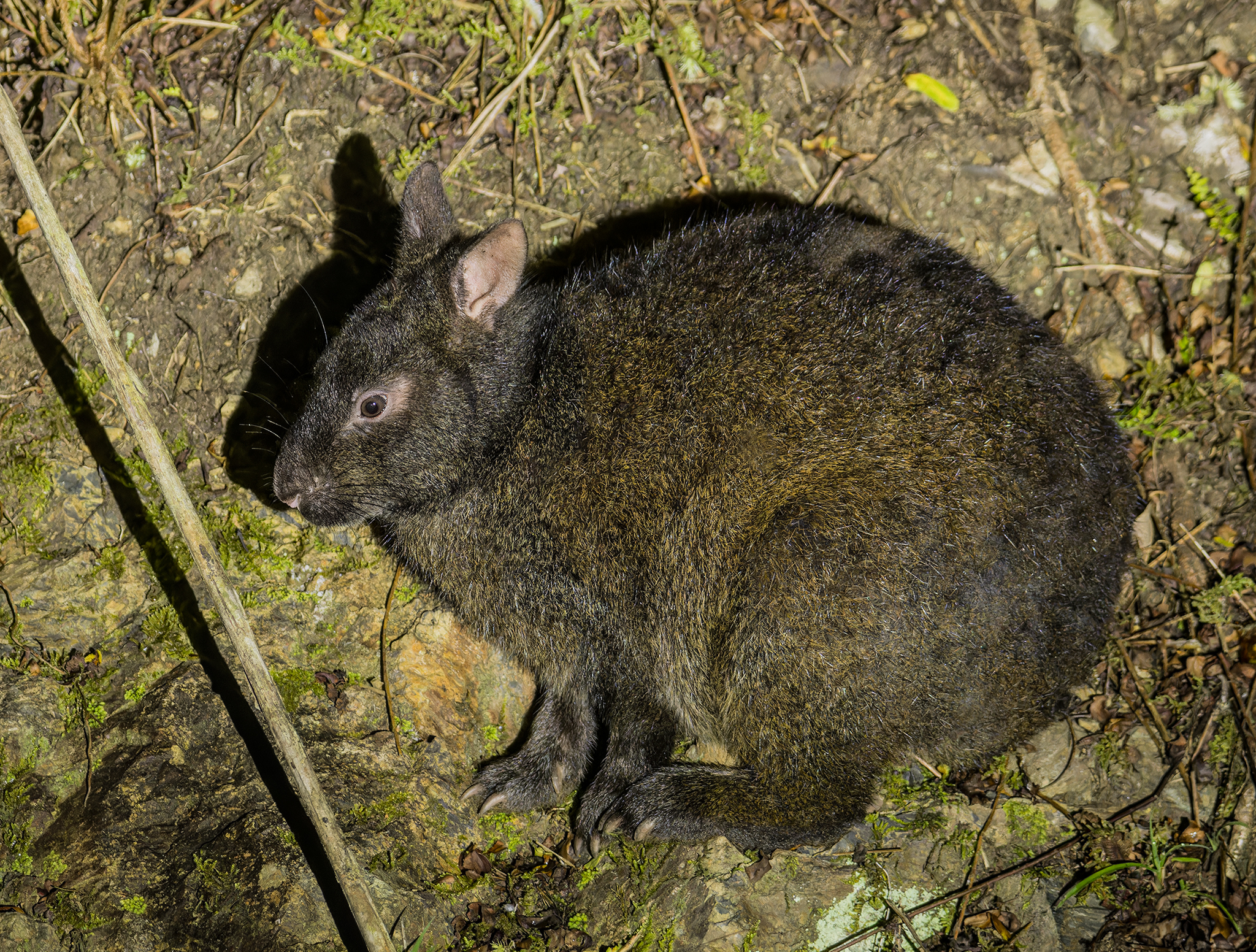

Conservation status
- Endangered (IUCN 3.1)

Scientific classification
- Kingdom: Animalia
- Phylum: Chordata
- Class: Mammalia
- Order: Lagomorpha
- Family: Leporidae
- Genus: Pentalagus; Lyon, 1904
- Species: P. furnessi

Binomial name
- Pentalagus furnessi (Stone, 1900)
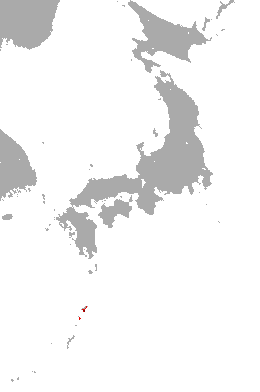
- Amami rabbit range

= Amami rabbit =

Amami rabbit Temporal range: Late Pleistocene – present 0.03 to 0 million years ago

Species of mammal

The Amami rabbit (Pentalagus furnessi), also known as the Ryukyu rabbit, is a dark-furred species of rabbit which is found only on Amami Ōshima and Tokunoshima, two small islands between southern Kyūshū and Okinawa in Japan. Often called a living fossil, the Amami rabbit is a living remnant of ancient rabbits that once lived on the Asian mainland, where they died out, remaining only on the two small Japanese islands where they live today.

== Evolution ==
Pentalagus is thought to be a descendant of Pliopentalagus, known from the Pliocene of China and Eastern to Central Europe. It is also closely related to the North American genus Aztlanolagus (which may be synonynous with Pliopentalagus), which became extinct sometime after 30,000 years ago. The closest living relative of the Amami rabbit has been suggested to be the Central African Bunyoro rabbit (Poelagus marjorita). Uniquely among rabbits, it has 46 diploid chromosomes.

== Etymology ==
The generic name Pentalagus, as described by Marcus Ward Lyon Jr., refers to the Amami rabbit having five molars on each side of the upper jaw, rather than six like other extant leporids. The specific name furnessi refers to the original discoverer of the Amami rabbit, William Henry Furness III.

== Biology ==
=== Diet ===
The Amami rabbit feeds on over 29 species of plants, which incorporates 17 species of shrubs and 12 species of herbaceous plants, consuming mostly the sprouts, young shoots and acorns. It also eats nuts and cambium of a wide variety of plant species. It is observed that the Amami rabbit also feeds on the bark of stems and twigs of shrub plants. During summer, the Amami rabbit primarily feeds on Japanese pampas grass, and during winter, they primarily eat the acorns of the pasania tree. The Amami rabbit also eats the fruits of Balanophora yuwanensis, a parasitic flowering plant, for which they are the main distributors of seed.

=== Morphology ===
The Amami rabbit has short feet and hind legs, a somewhat bulky body, and rather large and curved claws used for digging and sometimes climbing. Its ears are significantly smaller compared to those of other hares or rabbits. The pelage is thick, wooly and dark, brown on top and becomes more reddish-brown on the sides. It has heavy, long and very strong claws, being nearly straight on the forefeet and curved on the hindfeet. The eyes are also small compared to more common rabbits and hares. The average weight is 2.5–2.8 kg (5.5–6.2 lb).

=== Distribution and habitat ===
The ideal habitat for these rabbits is in an area between mature and young forests. They use the dense mature forests as protection and for the presence of pampas grass, in the summer, and acorns, in the winter, for their diets. They also use the high density of perennial grasses and herbaceous ground cover in the young forests for their diets during different times of the year. Therefore, the best habitat for them to live in is where they have easy access to both young and mature forests with no obstructions between the two forest types.

Using fecal pellet counts and resident surveys, the number of rabbits is estimated at 2000–4800 left on Amami Island and 120–300 left on Tokuno Island.

=== Behavior ===
This species is a nocturnal forest-dweller that reproduces once in late March–May and once in September–December, having one or two young each time. During the day, the mother digs a hole in the ground, for her young to hide in. At night, she opens the entrance to the hole, while watching for predators (such as venomous snakes), and then nurses her young, after which she closes the hole with soil and plant material by thumping on it with her front paws. Amami rabbits sleep during the day in hidden locations, such as caves. They are also noted for having a call similar to that of a pika.

== Endangered species ==
=== Threats ===
Before 1921, hunting and trapping were another cause of decline in population numbers. In 1921, Japan declared the Amami rabbit a "natural monument" which prevented it from being hunted. Then in 1963, it was changed to a "special natural monument" which prevented it from being trapped as well.

Habitat destruction, such as forest clearing for commercial logging, agriculture space, and residential areas, is the most detrimental activity on the distribution of these rabbits. Since they prefer a habitat of both mature and young forests, they do not thrive in only mature forests untouched by destruction, yet they do not thrive in newly growing forests alone, either. There are plans to remove the current habitat for these rabbits for the construction of golf courses and resorts, which is allowed because it will not directly be killing the rabbit, just changing the environment where it dwells, which is legal even under the protection of the special natural monument status.

The Amami rabbit also faces huge threats from the invasive predators, being a major cause for the decline in population size. On the island of Amami, the small Indian mongoose (Urva auropunctata) was released to control the population of a local venomous snake, and its numbers increased dramatically. This mongoose, along with feral cats and dogs, are outpreying the Amami rabbit. Feral cats and small Indian Mongooses proved to be a threat to not only Amami rabbits but several other endangered endemic species in the area such as the Amami jay. The Ministry of the Environment of the Government of Japan declared the small Indian mongoose eradicated on Amami Island in September 2024.

=== Conservation ===
In July 2008, the Amami Rangers for nature conservation obtained a photograph of a feral cat carrying a rabbit corpse (rabbit bones and fur found in cat or dog droppings had already been found), prompting discussions on better ways to control pets. A small area of the Amami Island has the Amami Guntō National Park that further protects the population. Some attempt at habitat restoration has been made, but the Amami rabbit needs a mosaic of mature and young forest in close proximity, and when a young forest is regrown nowhere near a mature forest, this rabbit is not likely to inhabit it. Research and population monitoring also are underway to try to keep the numbers from declining, even if they cannot be increased.

Suggested conservation work for the future includes habitat restoration and predator population control, as a healthy balance of mature and young forests still exists on the southern end of Amami. Restricting logging would also help to keep more forest available for the rabbits to live in by leaving more forest standing, as well as disturbing the surrounding environment more. An end to the building of forest roads used for logging and travel would further protect the Amami rabbit, as they cause population and habitat fragmentation, destroys their prime habitat and allows predators easier access to the middle of forests where a majority of the rabbit population exists. Controlling the populations of mongooses, feral dogs, and feral cats is another approach that could help bolster the rabbit population. Eradication of the mongooses and feral cats and dogs is needed, as well as better control of pets by local island residents.

In Japan, Hirakawa Zoo in Kagoshima City successfully bred 11 individuals in captivity between 1984 and 1989: four from late March to May, and seven from September to December. The Lagomorph Specialist Group of the International Union for the Conservation of Nature and Natural Resources proposed a plan of conservation in 1990. In Amami-Oshima Island, the Amami Wildlife Conservation Center of the Ministry of the Environment was established in 1999. It designated the Amami rabbit as endangered in 2004 for Japan and restarted a mongoose eradication program in 2005.
