= Ukejima =

Island within the Amami Islands of Japan

Native name: Uxezima (請島)
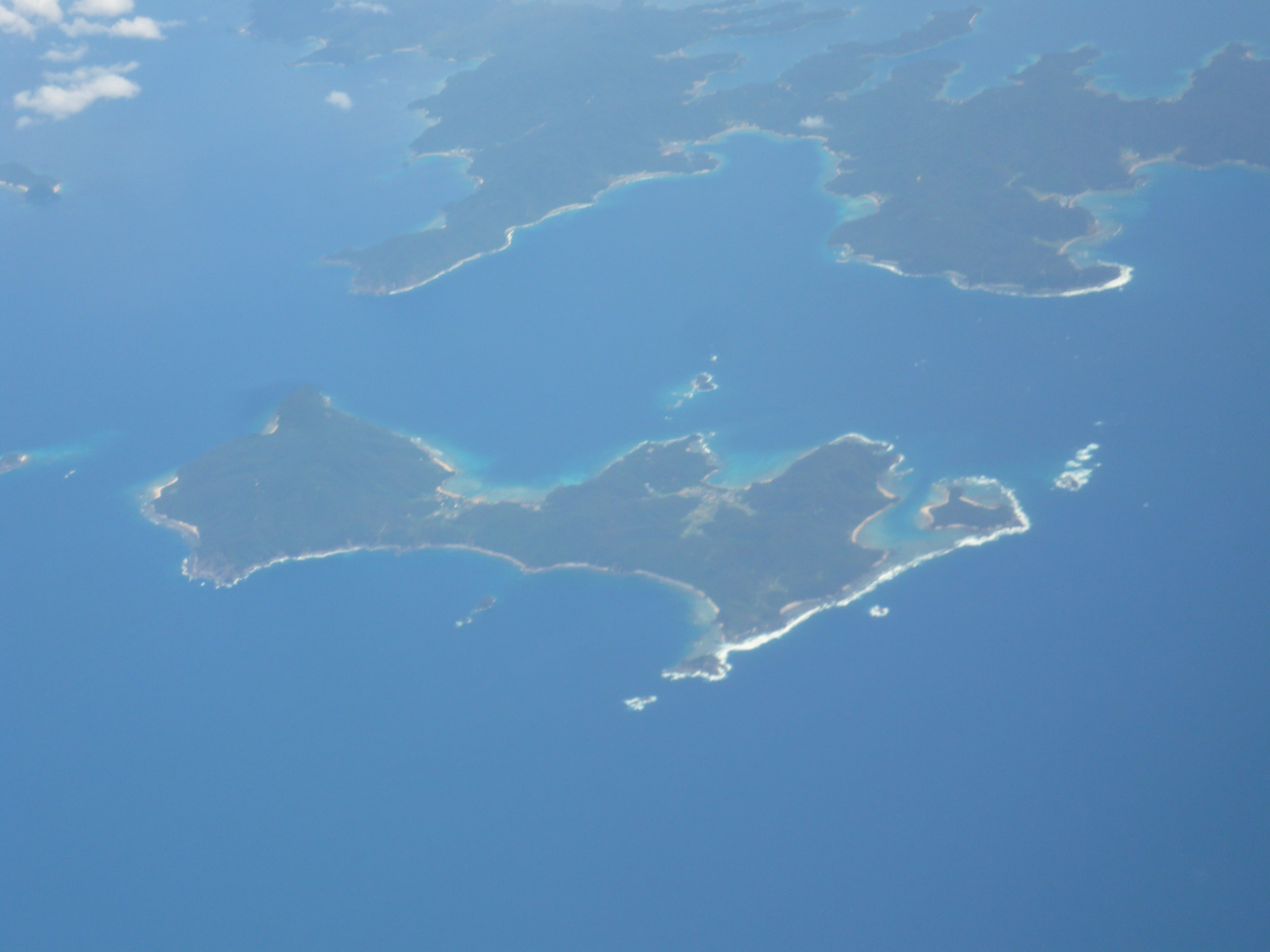
- Aerial photo of Ukejima

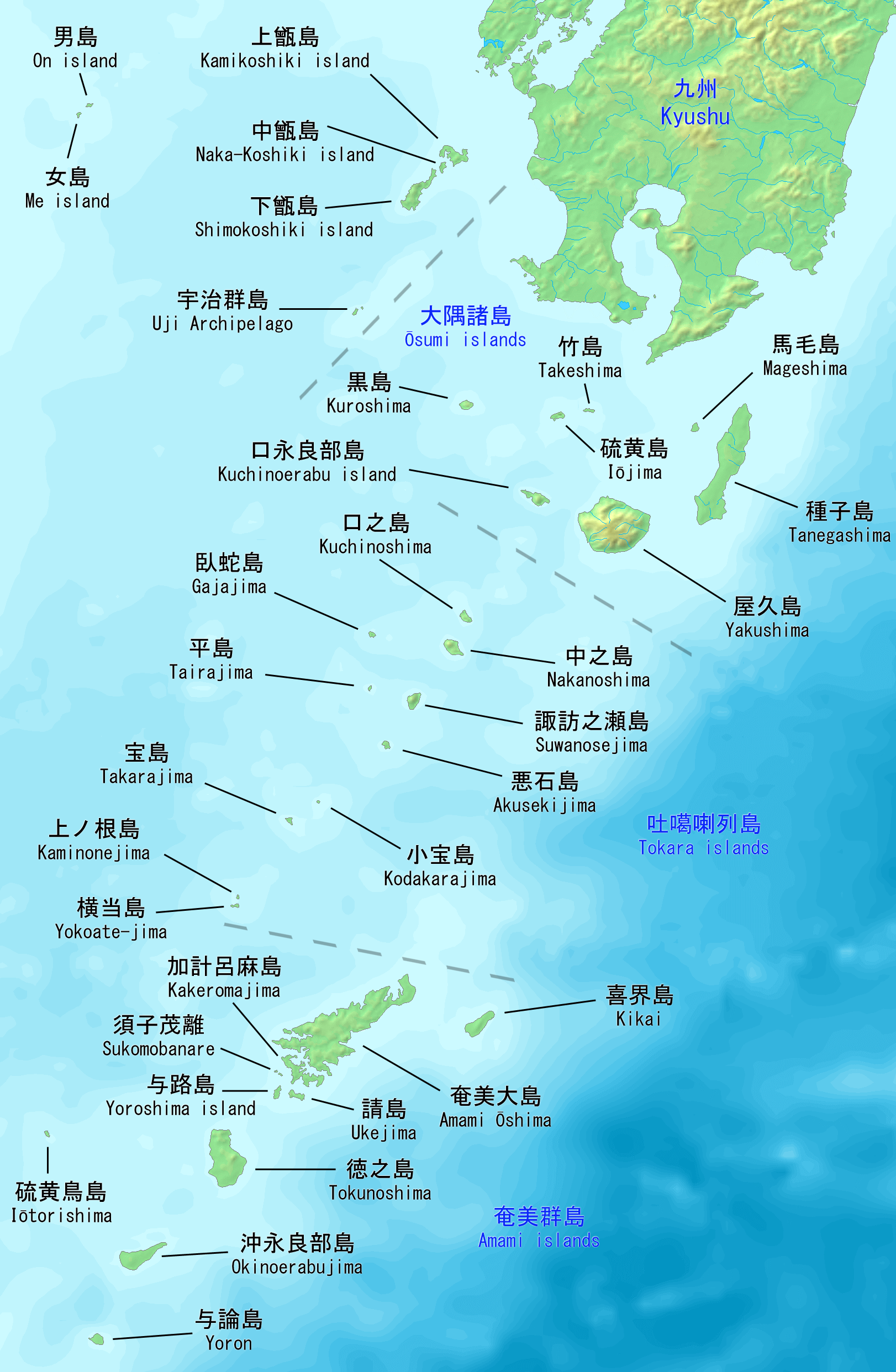

Geography
- Location: East China Sea
- Coordinates: 28°01′38″N 129°14′22″E
- Archipelago: Amami Islands
- Area: 13.35 km^{2} (5.15 sq mi)
- Coastline: 25 km (15.5 mi)
- Highest elevation: 400 m (1300 ft)
- Highest point: Ōyama

Administration
- Japan
- Prefectures: Kagoshima Prefecture
- District: Ōshima District
- Town: Setouchi

Demographics
- Population: 200 (2013)
- Pop. density: 15/km^{2} (39/sq mi)
- Ethnic groups: Ryukyuan, Japanese

Ukejima (Japanese: 請島; Amami: Uxezima) is one of the Satsunan Islands of Japan, classed within the Amami archipelago between Kyūshū and Okinawa. The island has an area of 13.34 square kilometres (5.15 sq mi) and a population of approximately 200 people. Administratively it is part of the town of Setouchi in Kagoshima Prefecture. Much of the island is within the borders of the Amami Guntō Quasi-National Park. Economically, the islanders engage in commercial fishing and seasonal tourism.

== Geography ==
Ukejima is an island southeast of Kakeromajima, from which it is separated by a narrow strait. The second smallest inhabited island in the archipelago, the island has an area of 13.34 square kilometres (5.15 sq mi). The highest point, Mount Ōyama is 400 metres (1,300 ft) above sea level. The coast of the island is surrounded by a coral reef. As with nearby Yoroshima to the northwest, the island is noted for its high density of habu poisonous vipers.

The climate of Ukejima is classified as has a humid subtropical climate (Köppen climate classification Cfa) with very warm summers and mild winters. The rainy season lasts from May through September. The island is subject to frequent typhoons.

== History ==
It is uncertain when Ukejima was first settled. The island came under the control of the Satsuma Domain in 1609 and its incorporation into the official holdings of that domain was recognized by the Tokugawa shogunate in 1624. After the Meiji Restoration it was incorporated into Ōsumi Province and later became part of Kagoshima Prefecture.

Following World War II, although with the other Amami Islands, Ukejima was occupied by the United States until 1953, at which time it reverted to the control of Japan.

== Transportation ==
Ukejima is connected to Amami-Oshima by frequent ferry services.
