= Ikue Asazaki =

Japanese folk singer (born 1935)

Ikue Asazaki 朝崎 郁恵
- Born: 11 November 1935 (age 91); Setouchi, Kagoshima, Japan
- Genre: Folk
- Occupation: Singer
- Years active: 1955–present

Ikue Asazaki (朝崎 郁恵, Asazaki Ikue; born 11 November 1935) is a Japanese folk singer. She grew up on the Amami Islands (in Setouchi, Kagoshima) which are famous for spawning popular singers of shima-uta, Amami's traditional music genre. Her father influenced her early music strongly during her upbringing. Her musical style sometimes resembles the style of New Age. Her most famous albums are Utabautayun with traditional Amami songs and lyrics, and Minya, with Akira Takahashi accompanying her on the piano.

She lived for ten years in Yokohama and served from 1984 in the National Theatre of Japan. In 1990 she gave concerts in the Carnegie Hall, in New York, Los Angeles, and Cuba. Ikue Asazaki participates every year at the Ryukyu Festival in Hibiya. In 2007 she gave a concert in the Ikegami Honmonji temple. She currently lives in Tokyo and her first best of album was released under Universal in 2008.

Obokuri-Eeumi, the opening track of the Utabautayun album, was used in episode 14 of the Samurai Champloo anime series.

== Discography ==
=== Major Labels ===
- Utabautayun (2002)
- Uta Ashiibi (Uta Asobi) (2003)
- Obokuri (2005)

=== Independent Labels ===
- Amami (1997)
- うたじま「詩島」(2002)
- Shimayumuta (2006)
- Hamasaki (2007)
