= Yoroshima =

Island within the Amami Islands of Japan

Yorojima
Native name: Yuru (与路島)
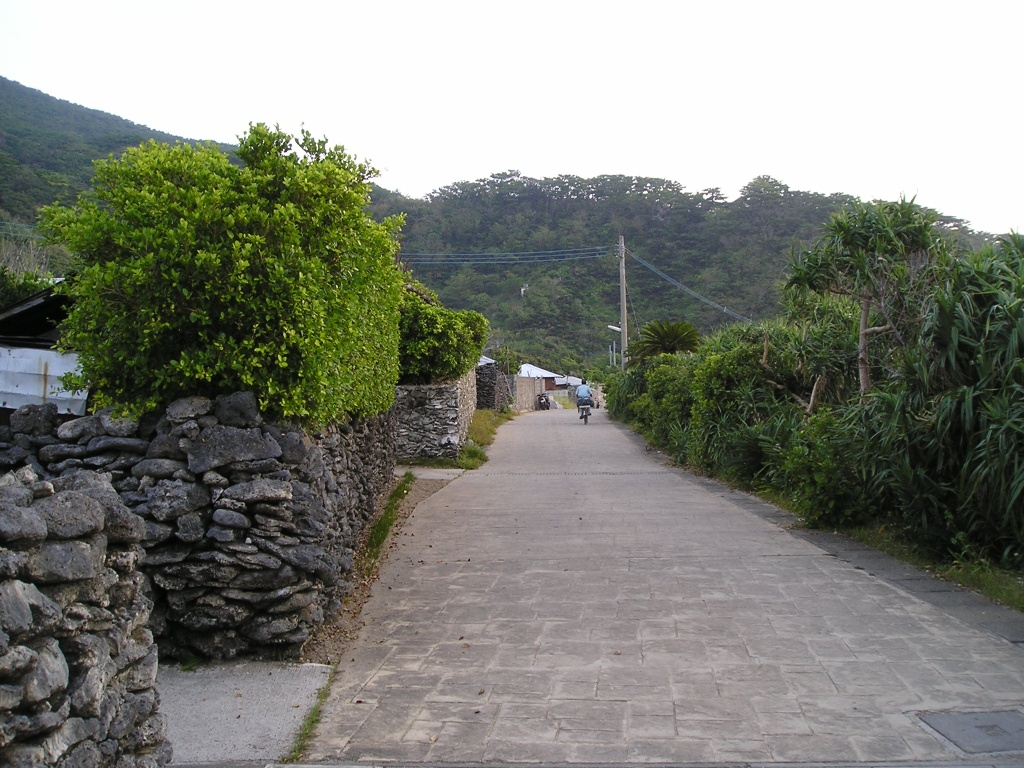
- Yorojima street

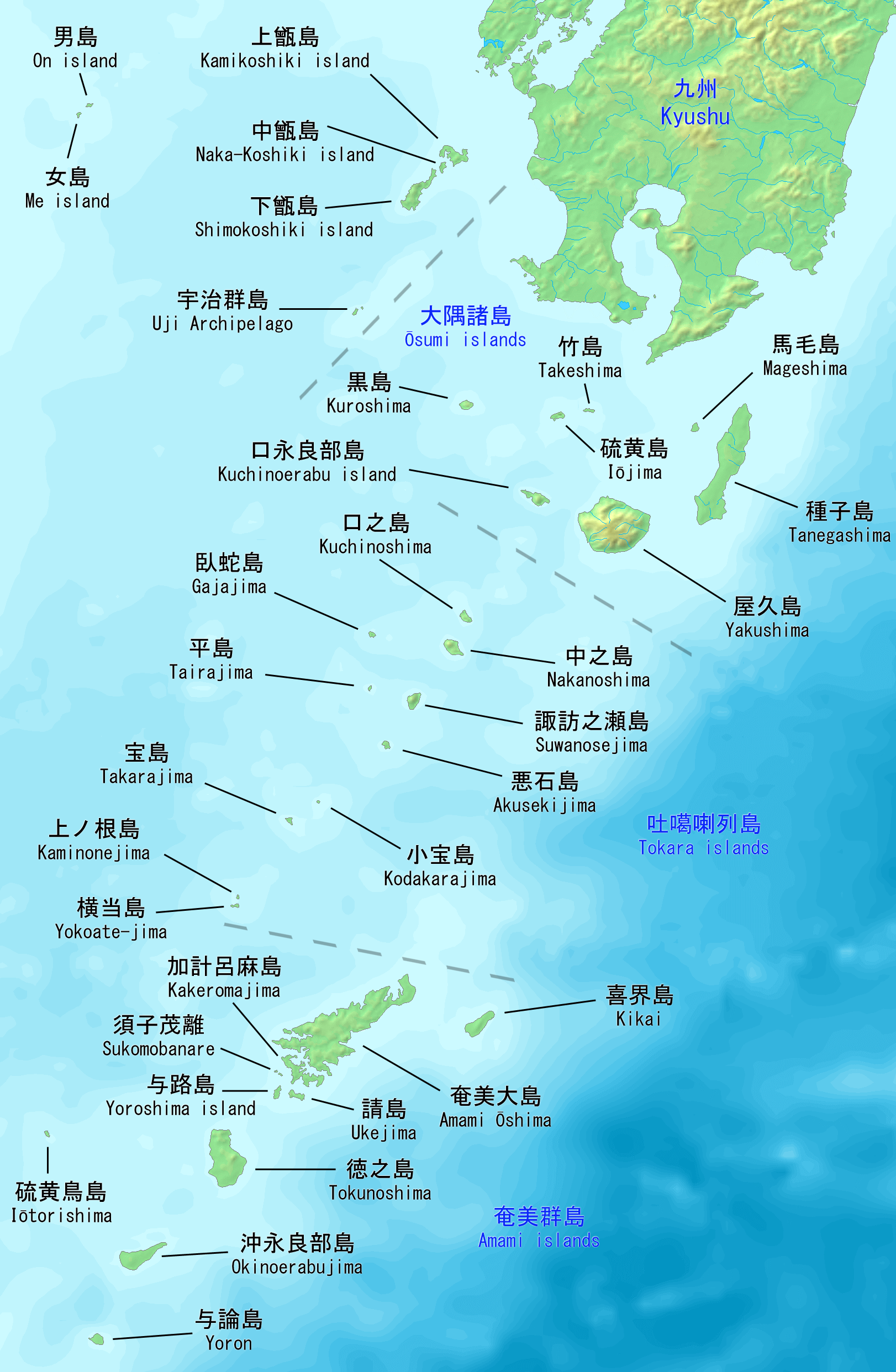

Geography
- Location: East China Sea
- Coordinates: 28°02′39″N 129°09′50″E
- Archipelago: Amami Islands
- Area: 9.35 km^{2} (3.61 sq mi)
- Coastline: 25 km (15.5 mi)
- Highest elevation: 297 m (974 ft)
- Highest point: Okachiyama

Administration
- Japan
- Prefectures: Kagoshima Prefecture
- District: Ōshima District
- Town: Setouchi

Demographics
- Population: 140 (2013)
- Pop. density: 15/km^{2} (39/sq mi)
- Ethnic groups: Ryukyuan, Japanese

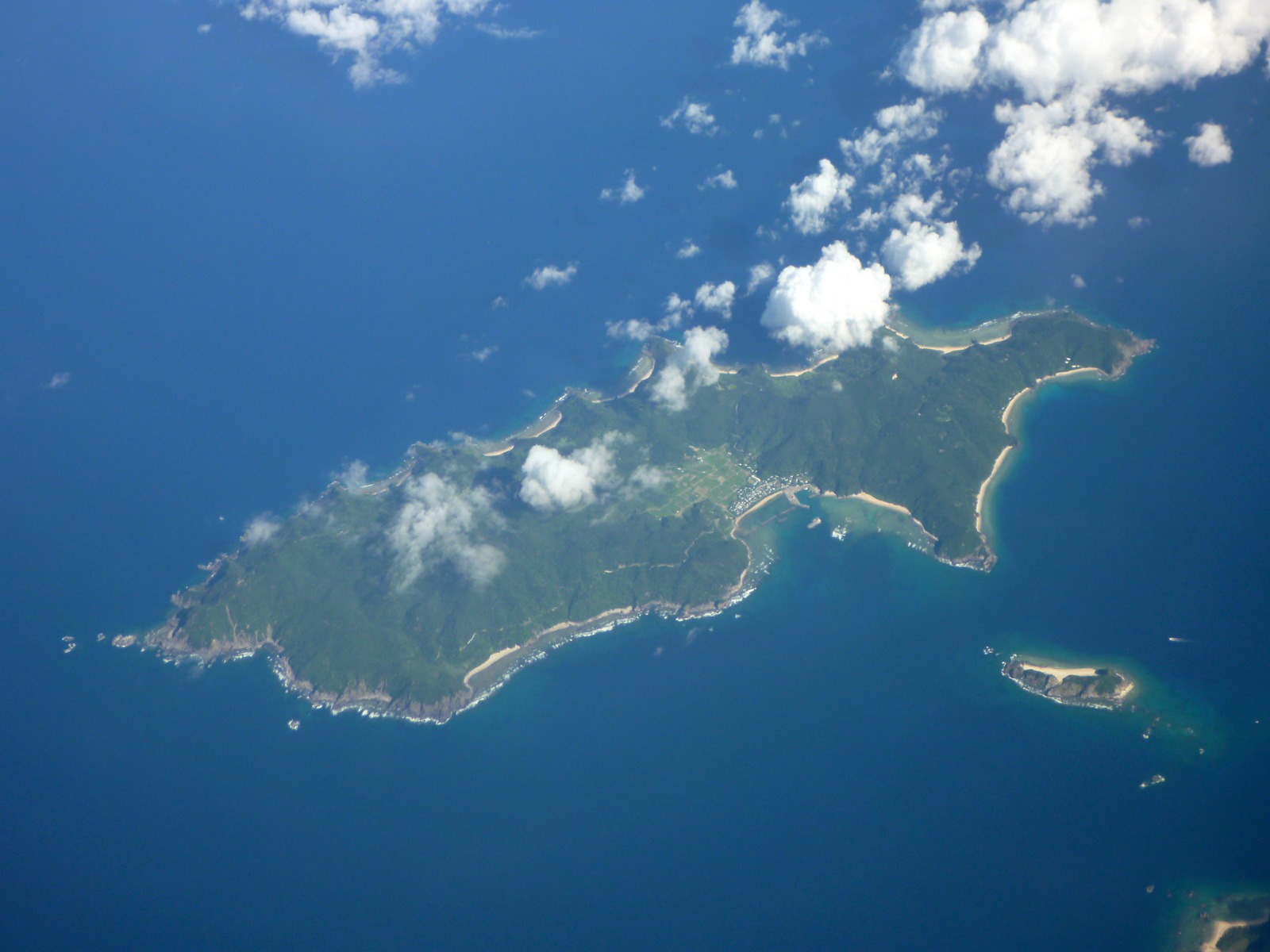
Yoroshima from the air

Yorojima (Japanese: 与路島; Amami: Yuru) is one of the Satsunan Islands, classed with the Amami archipelago between Kyūshū and Okinawa.

The island, 9.35 km² in area, has a population of approximately 140 persons, and is administered as the town of Setouchi, Kagoshima, on neighboring Amami-Oshima. Much of the island is within the borders of the Amami Guntō Quasi-National Park.

== Geography ==
Yorojima is the smallest inhabited island in the Amami archipelago, and is located offshore to the south of Amami-Ōshima, from which it can be reached by ferry in 80 minutes. The island is an elevated coralline island with its highest point, Okachiyama, at 297 metres (974 ft) above sea level. The island is noted for a high population density of habu poisonous vipers.

== Climate ==
Yorojima has a humid subtropical climate (Köppen climate classification Cfa) with very warm summers and mild winters. Precipitation is significant throughout the year, but is somewhat lower in winter. The island is subject to frequent typhoons.

== History ==
After the Meiji Restoration the island was incorporated into Ōsumi Province and later became part of Kagoshima Prefecture. Following World War II, although with the other Amami Islands, it was occupied by the United States until 1953, at which time it reverted to the control of Japan.
