= Yoronjima =

Island within the Amami Islands of Japan

与論島
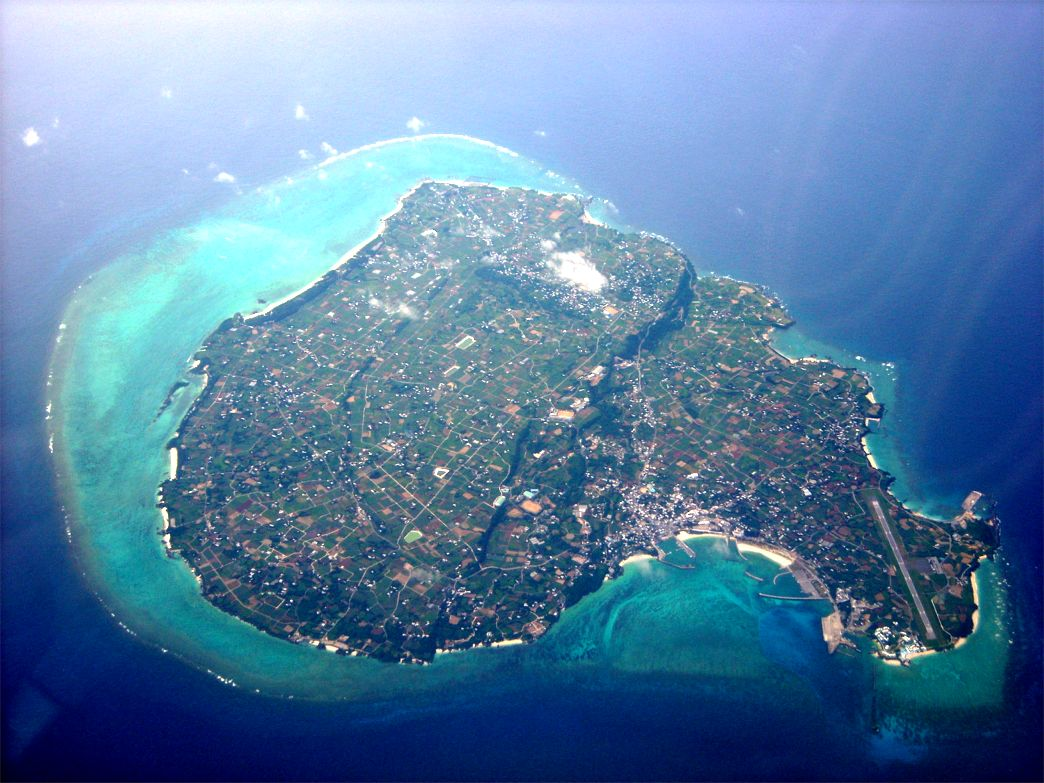
- Aerial view of Yoronjima in 2008

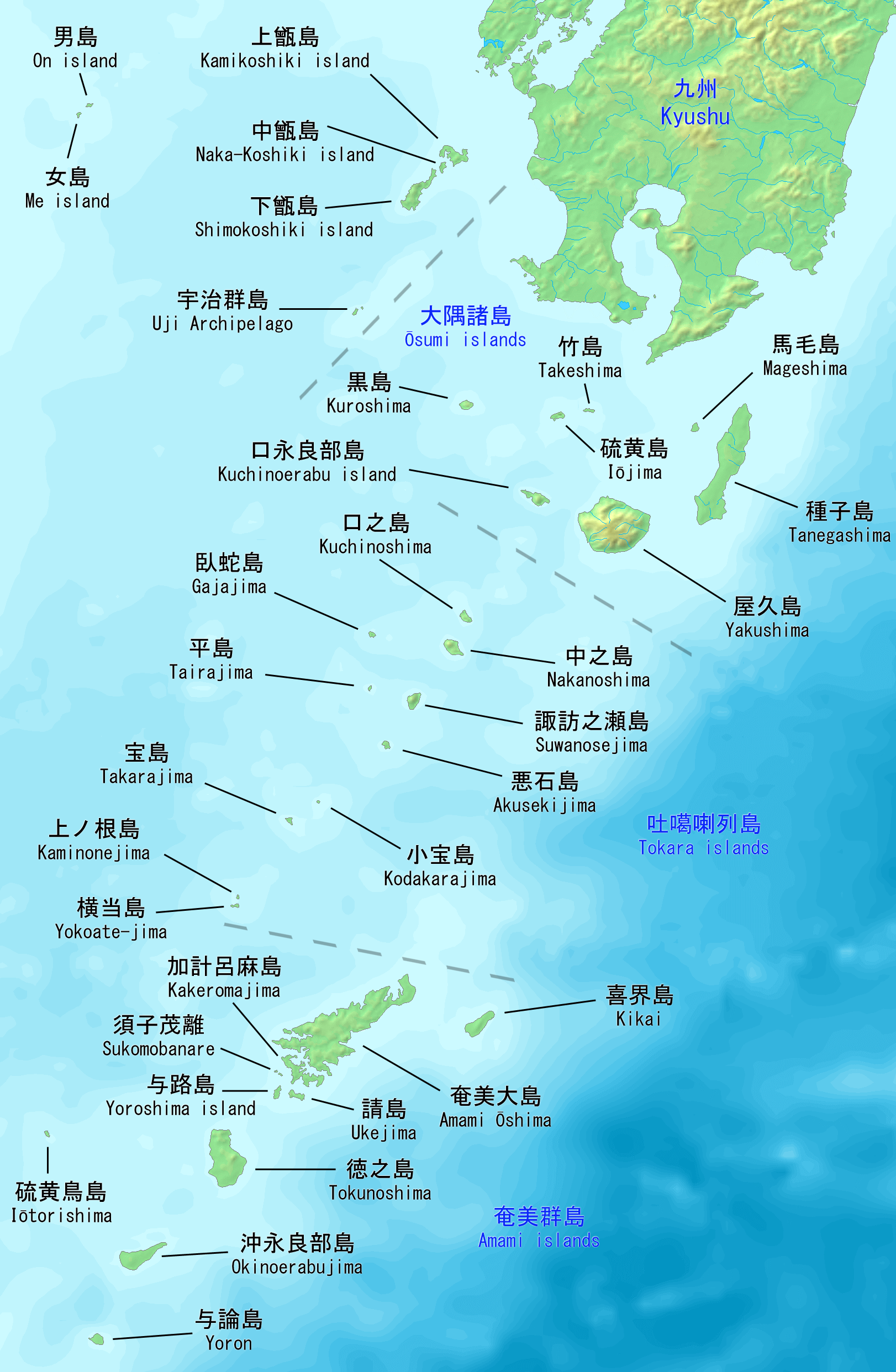

Geography
- Location: East China Sea
- Coordinates: 27°22′08″N 128°34′00″E
- Archipelago: Amami Islands
- Area: 20.8 km^{2} (8.0 sq mi)
- Coastline: 23.5 km (14.6 mi)
- Highest elevation: 98 m (322 ft)

Administration
- Japan
- Prefectures: Kagoshima Prefecture
- District: Ōshima District

Demographics
- Population: 6,000 (2013)
- Ethnic groups: Ryukyuan, Japanese

Yoronjima (Japanese: 与論島; Okinawan and Yoron: ユンヌ, Yunnu; Okinoerabu: ユーヌ, Yuunu; archaic Northern Ryukyuan: かゑふた, Kawefuta), also known as Yoron, is one of the Amami Islands.

The island, 20.8 km^{2} (8 sq. mi.) in area, has a population of approximately 6,000 people, and is administered as the town of Yoron, Kagoshima. Much of the island is within the borders of the Amami Guntō National Park.

== Geography ==
Yoronjima is the southernmost of the Amami Islands and is located approximately 22 kilometres (12 nmi) north of Hedo Point, the northernmost point of Okinawa Island, and 563 kilometres (304 nmi) south of the southern tip of Kyushu.

The island is an elevated coralline island with a highest point 97 metres (318 ft) above sea level. The coast of the island is surrounded by a coral reef.

=== Climate ===
Yoronjima has a humid subtropical climate (Köppen climate classification Cfa) with very warm summers and mild winters. Precipitation is significant throughout the year, but is somewhat lower in winter. The island is subject to frequent typhoons.

Climate data for Yoronjima (2000−2020 normals, extremes 2000−present)
Month	Jan	Feb	Mar	Apr	May	Jun	Jul	Aug	Sep	Oct	Nov	Dec	Year
Record high °C (°F)	25.8 (78.4)	26.3 (79.3)	28.4 (83.1)	29.9 (85.8)	30.8 (87.4)	32.6 (90.7)	34.9 (94.8)	34.9 (94.8)	34.2 (93.6)	33.0 (91.4)	30.3 (86.5)	27.5 (81.5)	34.9 (94.8)
Mean daily maximum °C (°F)	19.1 (66.4)	19.8 (67.6)	21.1 (70.0)	23.3 (73.9)	26.0 (78.8)	28.8 (83.8)	31.5 (88.7)	31.8 (89.2)	30.7 (87.3)	27.9 (82.2)	24.6 (76.3)	20.9 (69.6)	25.5 (77.8)
Daily mean °C (°F)	16.8 (62.2)	17.3 (63.1)	18.3 (64.9)	20.6 (69.1)	23.3 (73.9)	26.3 (79.3)	28.7 (83.7)	28.9 (84.0)	27.8 (82.0)	25.4 (77.7)	22.2 (72.0)	18.6 (65.5)	22.8 (73.1)
Mean daily minimum °C (°F)	14.3 (57.7)	14.9 (58.8)	15.9 (60.6)	18.2 (64.8)	21.2 (70.2)	24.5 (76.1)	26.7 (80.1)	26.7 (80.1)	25.6 (78.1)	23.4 (74.1)	20.2 (68.4)	16.3 (61.3)	20.7 (69.2)
Record low °C (°F)	5.4 (41.7)	6.8 (44.2)	6.5 (43.7)	11.2 (52.2)	14.5 (58.1)	17.4 (63.3)	22.7 (72.9)	22.0 (71.6)	19.1 (66.4)	17.1 (62.8)	11.2 (52.2)	7.9 (46.2)	5.4 (41.7)
Average precipitation mm (inches)	86.4 (3.40)	98.9 (3.89)	140.9 (5.55)	144.0 (5.67)	208.6 (8.21)	266.3 (10.48)	165.9 (6.53)	142.8 (5.62)	191.1 (7.52)	174.8 (6.88)	124.4 (4.90)	91.6 (3.61)	1,798.1 (70.79)
Average precipitation days (≥ 1.0 mm)	11.0	10.1	12.1	10.4	12.3	12.5	7.5	10.1	10.9	9.3	8.7	10.3	125.2
Source: Japan Meteorological Agency

== History ==
It is uncertain when Yoron Island was first settled. It was ruled by the Aji nobility from the 8th century onwards. From 1266 it was part of the Hokuzan Kingdom until its incorporation into the Ryukyu Kingdom in 1416. The samurai force from Satsuma Domain went around Yoron on their way to Okinawa during the 1609 Invasion of Ryukyu, after which its incorporation into the official holdings of that domain was recognized by the Tokugawa shogunate in 1624. Satsuma rule was harsh, with the inhabitants of the island reduced to serfdom and forced to raise sugar cane to meet high taxation, which often resulted in famine.

After the Meiji Restoration the island was incorporated into Ōsumi Province and later became part of Kagoshima Prefecture. Following World War II, along with the other Amami Islands, it was occupied by the United States until 1953, at which time it reverted to the control of Japan.

== Economy ==
When Okinawa was governed by the United States, Yoronjima was the southernmost island Japanese mainlanders could go to for vacation, and it became a tourist spot. Tourism is still a large part of the local economy, with numerous resorts offering water sports and other activities.

With moderate rainfall and a warm climate, the island is suitable for agriculture. Main crops include sweet potatoes, sugar cane and floriculture. Brown sugar refining and the production of distilled shōchū liquor and vinegar and sea salt are also major industries.

== Transportation ==
Yoron Airport (IATA: RNJ; ICAO: RORY) serves travelers to and from the island. Japan Air Commuter flies to Kagoshima and Okinoerabu Airports, and Ryukyu Air Commuter provides service to Naha Airport.

Ships on the Marix and A Line Lines operate between Yoron Port and Kagoshima, Amami Ōshima, and other local destinations, as well as Kobe and Osaka.

== Culture ==
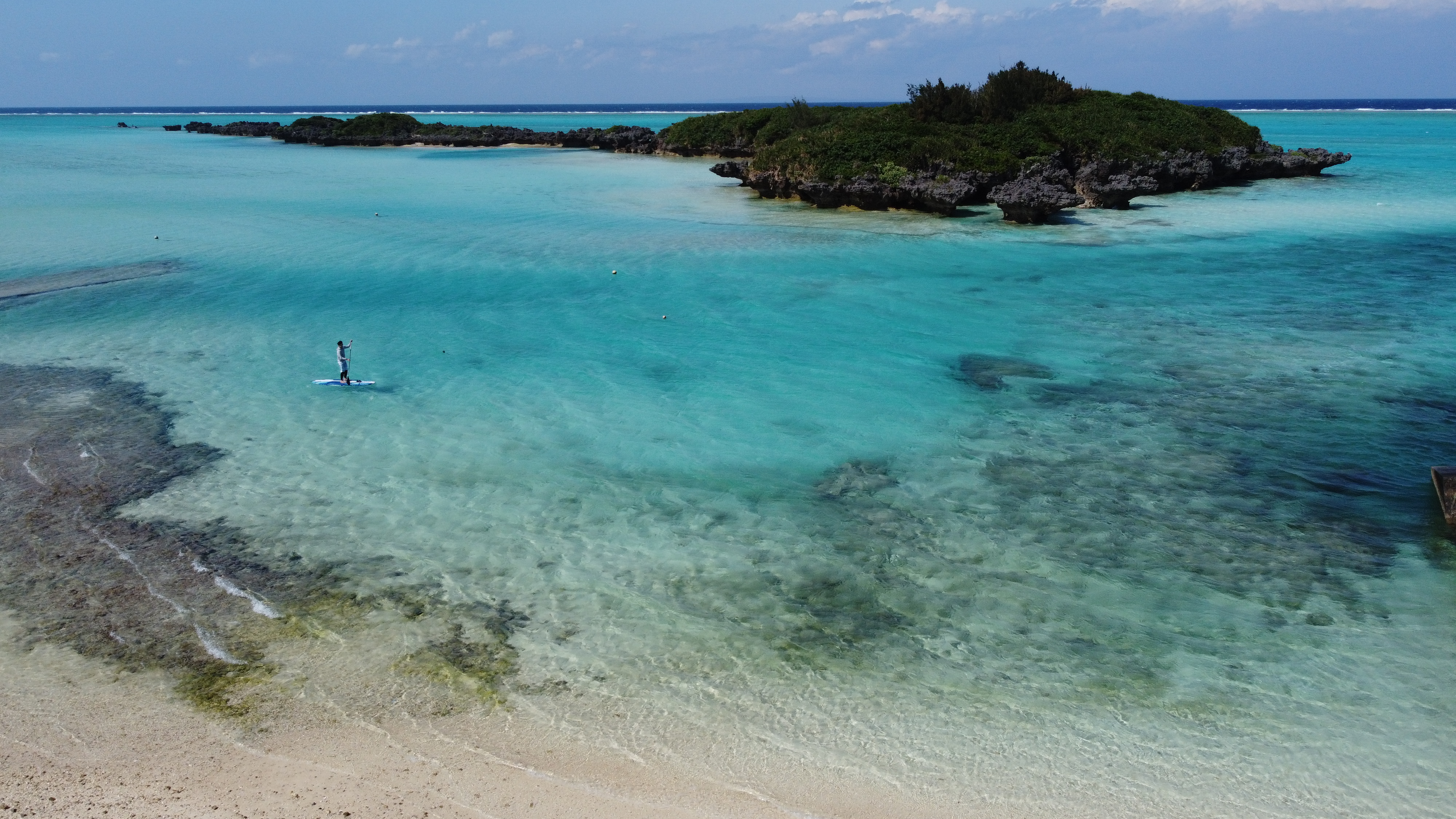
Minata Beach

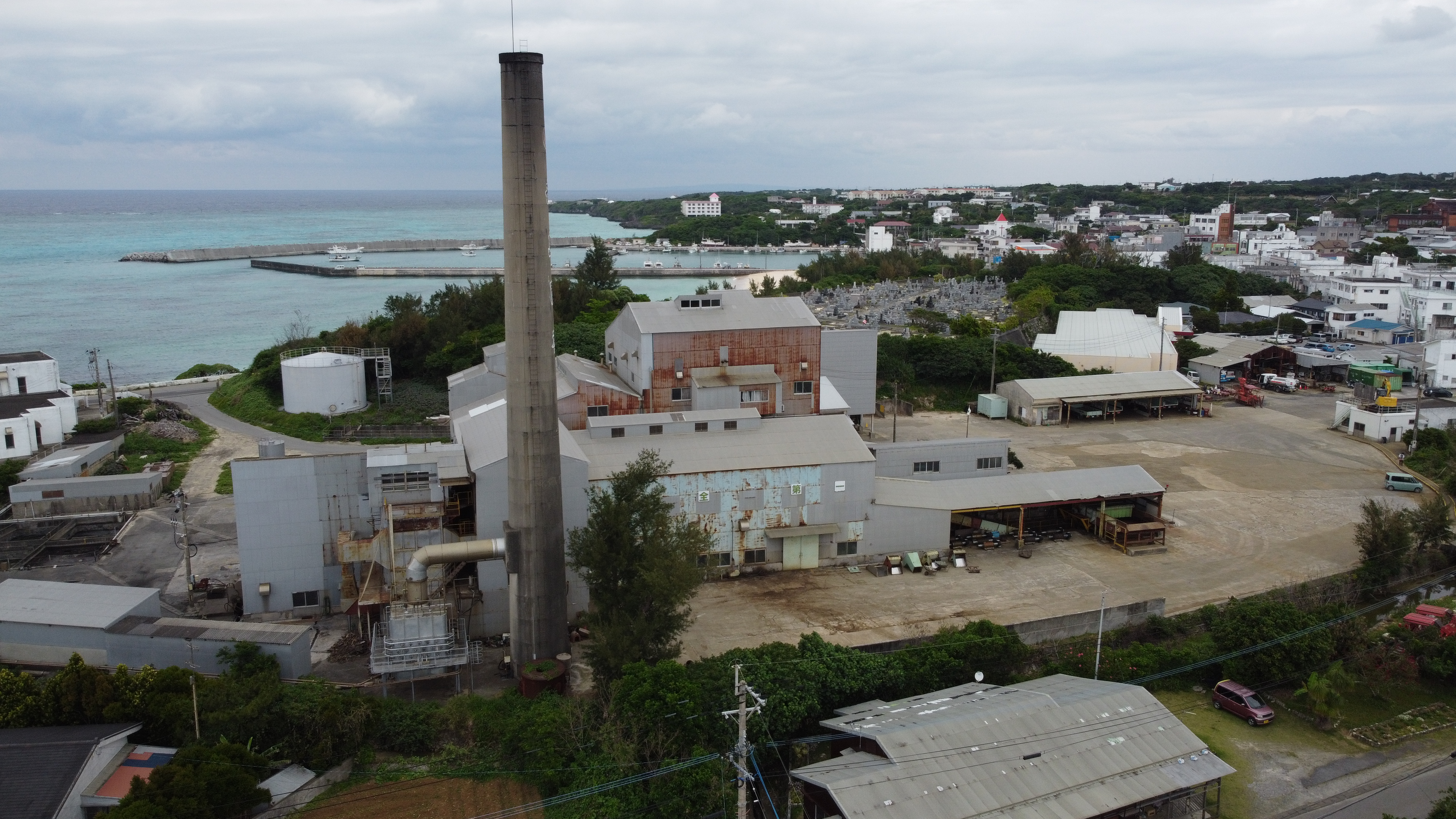
Yoronjima-seito (与論島製糖)

The island still maintains close ties to Okinawan culture, with Eisa, a kind of Okinawa drumming and dancing style, popular for festivals such as the Sango Matsuri (Coral Festival), held every August. Okinawa patterns and styles of dress are also more common than that of mainland Japan.

Another difference from mainland Japan are cultural religious practices. Mainland Japanese practice both Shintoism and Buddhism, but the native culture of Yoron does not include many of the Buddhist elements seen on the mainland, and both weddings and funerals are practiced in the ancient Shinto tradition. Islanders still celebrate many ancient practices and festivals, with costumes and descriptions on display at the Yoron Museum, including a replica of a traditional village, complete with thatched-roof huts, tools, palm-leaf textiles and other items on display. Thatched-roof huts still exist in use throughout the island.

A unique cultural practice is Yoron Kenpo, which includes formalized speeches along with the consumption of sugar-based shōchū as an offering to the gods. This practice dates back to the Muromachi Period of Japanese history.

Some Yoron people continue to speak their own language, Yunnu futuba (Yoron language), one of the Ryukyuan languages. Its basic grammar is similar to Japanese language, however, Yunnu Futuba has a wider range of sounds and an even stricter system of hierarchy for speech, with respectful suffixes and prefixes for elders and men being an integral part of the grammar and syntax of the language. Most young adults can still speak Yunnu Futuba but children no longer learn the language or do not learn fluency, as Japanese is spoken at school and at work.

== Local attractions ==
Yoron has a number of beaches, including Yuri and Sunset, and its white beaches are famous throughout Japan. It is also the home of Pricia Resort, a popular location for Japanese people on holiday.
