= Amagi, Kagoshima =

Amagi 天城町
- Town
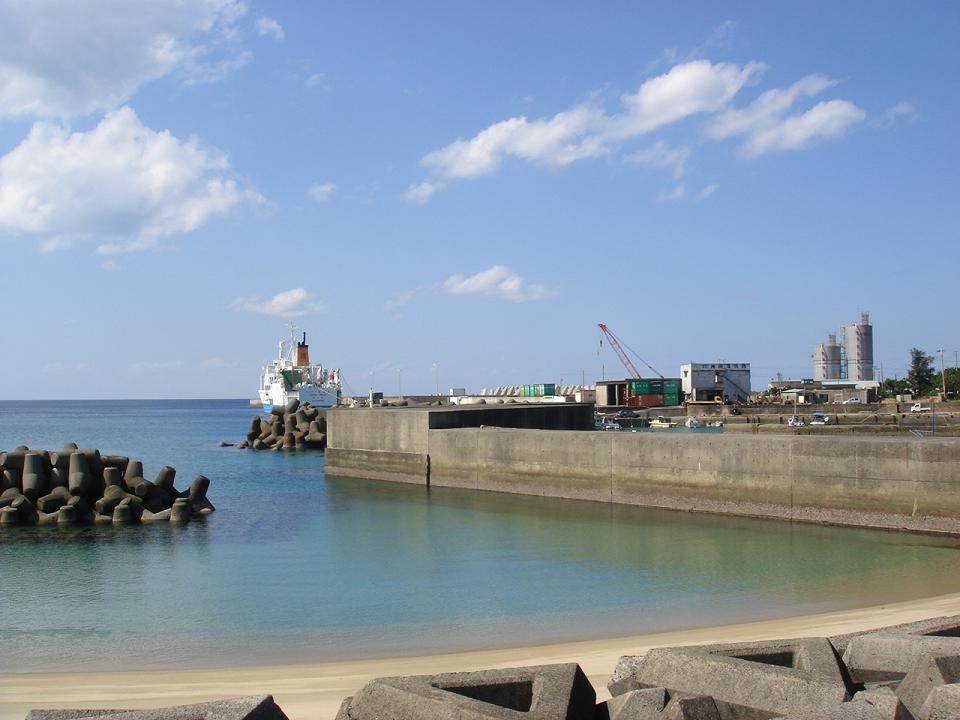
- Hetono Port, Amagi

- Flag Emblem
- Interactive map of Amagi
- Coordinates: 27°48′43″N 128°53′51″E
- Country: Japan
- Region: Kyushu (Amami Islands)
- Prefecture: Kagoshima
- District: Ōshima

Area
  - Total: 80.40 km^{2} (31.04 sq mi)

Population (February 1, 2025)
  - Total: 5,464
  - Density: 67.96/km^{2} (176.0/sq mi)
- Time zone: UTC+9 (Japan Standard Time)
- Phone number: 0997-85-3111
- Address: 891-7612 Kagoshima-ken Ōshima-gun Amagi-chō Hetono 2691-1
- Climate: Cfa
- Website: Official website
- Symbols
- Flower: Rhododendron
- Tree: Cycas revoluta

Amagi (天城町, Amagi-chō) is a town on the northwest coast of Tokunoshima, in Ōshima District, Kagoshima Prefecture, in the northern Ryukyu Islands of Japan. As of 1 February 2025, the town had an estimated population of 5,464 in 3095 households and a population density of 68 persons per km^{2}. The Masena River flows into the sea at Amagi.

Amagi is served by Tokunoshima Airport and Hetono Port and is a centre for sugarcane production and seasonal tourism. Around 20 bullfighting events are held in Amagi each year.

== History and governance ==
Amagi Village was established in 1908, with the establishment of the modern municipalities system. As with all of Tokunoshima, the village came under the administration of the United States from 1946 to 25 December 1953. On 1 January 1961, Amagi was upgraded to town status.

Amagi has a mayor-council form of government with a directly elected mayor and a unicameral town council of 14 members.

In 2024, Amagi was awarded the "Best Tourism Village 2024" by the United Nations World Tourism Organization due to its sustainable urban development.

== Geography and climate ==
Amagi occupies the northwestern portion of the island of Tokunoshima, in the Amami archipelago of the southern Satsunan Islands in the Ryukyu Islands of Kagoshima Prefecture, Japan, with the East China Sea to the west. Amagi is surrounded by the municipalities of Isen to the south and Tokunoshima to the east. The total area of the municipality is 80.40 km^{2} (31.04 sq mi). The Masena River flows into the sea at Amagi.

=== Climate ===
The climate is classified as humid subtropical (Köppen climate classification Cfa) with very warm summers and mild winters. Precipitation is high throughout the year, but is highest in the months of May, June and September.

Climate data for Amagi, Kagoshima (2003−2020 normals, extremes 2003−present)
Month	Jan	Feb	Mar	Apr	May	Jun	Jul	Aug	Sep	Oct	Nov	Dec	Year
Record high °C (°F)	25.4 (77.7)	25.2 (77.4)	26.4 (79.5)	27.9 (82.2)	30.3 (86.5)	33.0 (91.4)	35.0 (95.0)	35.2 (95.4)	34.6 (94.3)	32.6 (90.7)	29.5 (85.1)	27.2 (81.0)	35.2 (95.4)
Mean daily maximum °C (°F)	18.6 (65.5)	19.3 (66.7)	20.7 (69.3)	23.1 (73.6)	26.0 (78.8)	28.6 (83.5)	31.7 (89.1)	32.0 (89.6)	30.8 (87.4)	27.8 (82.0)	24.2 (75.6)	20.2 (68.4)	25.3 (77.5)
Daily mean °C (°F)	15.6 (60.1)	16.2 (61.2)	17.6 (63.7)	20.0 (68.0)	23.0 (73.4)	26.0 (78.8)	28.7 (83.7)	28.8 (83.8)	27.6 (81.7)	24.8 (76.6)	21.3 (70.3)	17.4 (63.3)	22.3 (72.1)
Mean daily minimum °C (°F)	12.6 (54.7)	13.1 (55.6)	14.5 (58.1)	16.9 (62.4)	20.3 (68.5)	23.9 (75.0)	26.4 (79.5)	26.2 (79.2)	25.0 (77.0)	22.2 (72.0)	18.4 (65.1)	14.4 (57.9)	19.5 (67.1)
Record low °C (°F)	4.6 (40.3)	5.9 (42.6)	5.1 (41.2)	9.3 (48.7)	13.2 (55.8)	17.4 (63.3)	21.9 (71.4)	21.9 (71.4)	19.3 (66.7)	14.5 (58.1)	10.1 (50.2)	7.2 (45.0)	4.6 (40.3)
Average precipitation mm (inches)	87.6 (3.45)	86.6 (3.41)	127.6 (5.02)	126.6 (4.98)	211.2 (8.31)	362.1 (14.26)	158.6 (6.24)	197.1 (7.76)	214.1 (8.43)	163.3 (6.43)	117.9 (4.64)	93.5 (3.68)	1,957.2 (77.06)
Average precipitation days (≥ 1.0 mm)	11.8	11.1	11.4	9.9	11.9	13.5	7.4	12.1	12.0	9.2	9.2	11.2	130.7
Source: Japan Meteorological Agency

== Economy, facilities and culture ==
The economy of the town is based on sugarcane, with the production of brown sugar. The Nansei Cane Sugar Company is situated in the southwestern part of the town, with a factory on the Masena River, with many sugarcane fields in the area to the southwest. Also of note are livestock, potatoes and seasonal tourism.

Amagi is served by Tokunoshima Airport. Amagi, as with the rest of Tokunoshima, does not have any passenger railway services, and it is not located on any national highway or expressway. The town is served by Hetono Port. Takehara Hospital is at Hedono.

The town hosts an annual triathlon event. The Matsubara Bullring is known for its bullfighting events, hosting around 20 events a year.

== Notable people ==
- Kyokunankai Hiromitsu, sumo wrestler
