= Yoron language =

Dialect cluster of Northern Ryukyuan

Yoron
- ユンヌフトゥバ; Yunnu Futuba
- Native to: Japan
- Region: Yoronjima within the Amami Islands, Kagoshima Prefecture
- Native speakers: 950 (2004)
- Language family: Japonic: Ryukyuan; Northern Ryukyuan; Amami or Kunigami; Yoron
- Writing system: Japanese

Language codes
- ISO 639-3: yox
- Glottolog: yoro1243

The Yoron language (ユンヌフトゥバ Yunnu Futuba) is a dialect continuum spoken on Yoronjima in Kagoshima Prefecture, southwestern Japan. It is one of the Northern Ryukyuan languages, which are a sub-branch within the Japonic language family. The language is one of the most endangered languages in all of Japan.

== Dialects ==
According to local folklorist Kiku Chiyo(菊千代), Yoron dialects can be divided into three groups:

- Chabana
- Asato (/asi⸢tu/), Gusuku (/gusi⸢ku/ ～ /gusu⸢ku/), Ritchō, Kanō (/ha⸢noː/) and Nama (/naː⸢ma/)
- Mugiya-higashiku, Mugiya-nishiku and Furusato (/puru⸢satu/)

The Mugiya district is often considered to have a distinct form of accent and intonation.

== Folk terminology ==
According to Kiku Hidenori, who leads conservation activities, people of Yoron Island, Kagoshima Prefecture call their language "Yunnu Futuba." More precisely, a dictionary compiled by his mother Kiku Chiyo (b. 1927) gives /junnuhu⸢tuba/ as the word form of her home community, Mugiya-higashiku. Other words she collected include /junnu⸢jun/ (Yoron accent), /nizjancju⸢jun/ (accent of people of Mugiya-higashiku and Mugiya-nishiku), /sima⸢jun/ (speaking the dialect), /sima⸢guci/ and /simahu⸢tuba/ (the island/home community's language). Yamada Minoru (b. 1916) provides the word forms of the community of Chabana: /⸢ju⸣nnu ⸢fu⸣tuba/ and /⸢ʃi⸣ma ⸢fu⸣tuba/ (the island's language).

== Phonology ==
The following is the phonology of the Mugiya dialect, which is based on Hirayama et al. (1969).

=== Consonants ===
Consonant phonemes
	Bilabial		Alveolar		Post- alveolar		Palatal	Velar		Glottal	Moraic
Nasal		m		n							Q N
Stop	p	b	t	d				k	ɡ	ʔ	Q N
Affricate					t͡ʃ						Q N
Fricative			s	z						h	Q N
Approximant							j		w		Q N
Flap						r					Q N

Notes

- The null onset /∅/ may be added. It contrasts with glottal /h/ and /ʔ/.
- /h/ is [ç] before /i/, and [ɸ] before /u/. /hwa/ is phonetically realized as [ɸa].
- /si/, /se/ and [t͡ʃu] is realized as [ʃi], [ʃe], and [t͡su], respectively.
- [t͡ʃa], [t͡ʃu] and [t͡ʃo] are phonemically analyzed as /t͡ʃja/, /t͡ʃju/ and /t͡ʃjo/, respectively.
- [ʃa], [ʃu] and [ʃo] are phonemically analyzed as /sja/, /sju/ and /sjo/, respectively.
- N and Q are syllable codas (nasal and geminated stop, respectively).

=== Vowels ===
The Yoron language has /a/, /e/, /i/, /o/ and /u/, long and short.

=== Correspondences to Standard Japanese ===
Only major sound correspondences are listed.

- Standard Japanese /e/ is merged into /i/.
- Standard Japanese /o/ is merged into /u/.
- Yoron /e/ and /o/ are of secondary or loanword origin and mostly correspond to Standard Japanese diphthongs.
- Yoron retains /p/ while it has changed to /h/ in Standard Japanese.
- Standard Japanese /t͡ʃu/, /su/ and /zu/ correspond to /t͡ʃi/ [t͡ʃi], /si/ [ʃi] and /zi/ [d͡ʒi].
- Standard Japanese /k/ shows complex correspondences. Standard Japanese /ka/ corresponds to both Yoron /ka/ and /ha/. /ki/ corresponds to /ki/ and /si/. /ke/ corresponds to /si/ with some exceptions. /ko/ corresponds to /hu/.
- In some words, Standard Japanese /ni/ corresponds to Yoron /mi/.
- Yoron /r/ is dropped when it is surrounded by a vowel and /i/.
- Standard Japanese /o/ that comes from earlier /wo/ corresponds to Yoron /hu/.

== Resources ==
- Yorontō-go jiten (1995) by Yamada Minoru. The author is from Chabana, Yoron Island of the Amami Islands but also collected data from other communities on the island.
- Yoron hōgen jiten (2005) by Kiku Chiyo and Takahashi Toshizō. A dictionary for Kiku's home community, Mugiya-higashiku, Yoron Island of the Amami Islands.
