= Tokunoshima, Kagoshima =

Tokunoshima 徳之島町
- Town
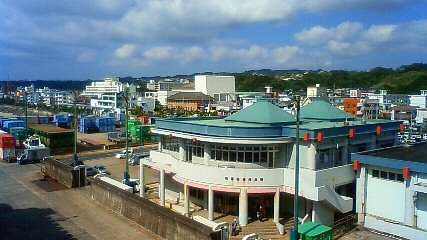
- Kametoku Port

- Flag Seal
- Location of Tokunoshima in Kagoshima Prefecture

- Tokunoshima (Kagoshima Prefecture)
- Coordinates: 27°43′36″N 129°01′07″E
- Country: Japan
- Region: Kyushu (Amami Islands)
- Prefecture: Kagoshima
- District: Ōshima

Government
  - Mayor: Hideki Takaoka

Area
  - Total: 104.92 km^{2} (40.51 sq mi)

Population (April 1, 2024)
  - Total: 9,403
  - Density: 89.62/km^{2} (232.1/sq mi)
- Time zone: UTC+9 (Japan Standard Time)
- Phone number: 0997-82-1111
- Address: 7203 Kametsu, Tokunoshima-machi, Ōshima-gun, Kagoshima-ken 891-7101
- Website: Official website

Tokunoshima (徳之島町, Tokunoshima-chō) is a town located on Tokunoshima, in Ōshima District, Kagoshima Prefecture, Japan. As of 1 April 2024, the town had an estimated population of 9,403 in 4493 households and a population density of 90 persons per km^{2}. The total area of the town is 104.92 km^{2} (40.51 sq mi).

== Geography ==
Tokunoshima occupies the northeastern portion of the island of Tokunoshima, with the Pacific Ocean to the east.

=== Surrounding municipalities ===
- Amagi
- Isen

=== Climate ===
The climate is classified as humid subtropical (Köppen climate classification Cfa) with very warm summers and mild winters (average temperature 21.1 °C (70.0 °F)). Precipitation is high throughout the year, but is highest in the months of May, June and September. Because of its climate, tropical and sub-tropical fruits are in abundance.

=== Demographics ===
Per Japanese census data, the population of Tokunoshima is as shown below:

Historical population
Year	Pop.	±%
1940	21,215	—
1950	19,804	−6.7%
1960	16,445	−17.0%
1970	12,142	−26.2%
1980	15,553	+28.1%
1990	14,536	−6.5%
2000	13,127	−9.7%
2010	12,090	−7.9%
2020	10,147	−16.1%

== History ==
From the Ritsuryo period, Tokushima was part of Ōsumi Province and was part of the holdings of Kagoshima Domain in the Edo period. On 1 April 1908 the village of Kametsu was founded with the creation of the modern municipalities system. It was upgraded to town status on January 1, 1942. As with all of Tokunoshima, the town came under the administration of the United States from 1 July 1946 to 25 December 1953. On 1 April 1958, Kametsu merged with the neighboring village of Higashi-Amagi, and was renamed Tokunoshima.

== Government ==
Tokushima has a mayor-council form of government with a directly elected mayor and a unicameral town council of 14 members. Tokushima, collectively with the other municipalities of Oshima District, contributes two members to the Kagoshima Prefectural Assembly. In terms of national politics, the town is part of the Kagoshima 2nd district of the lower house of the Diet of Japan.

=== Hamlets ===
The town as a governmental entity comprises several hamlets. The largest is Kametsu, is focused around the district of the same name and the neighboring port of Kametoku. Kametsu is the main center of commerce and services on the island.

- Boma
- Inokawa
- Kametoku
- Kametsu
- Kaminomine
- Kanami
- Kedoku
- Omo
- San
- Shimokushi
- Shirai
- Shoda
- Tete
- Todoroki
- Tokuwase

== Education ==
Tokushima has eight public elementary school and six public junior high schools operated by the town government, and one public high school operated by the Kagoshima Prefectural Board of Education.

== Transportation ==
=== Railways ===
Toshushima, as with the rest of Tokunoshima Island, does not have any passenger railway services.

=== Highways ===
Tokushima is not located on any national highway or expressway.

== Seaports ==
- Kametoku Port

== Noted people from Tokunoshima ==
- Asashio Tarō III, sumo wrestler
- Kyokudōzan Kazuyasu, sumo wrestler
- Ichinoya Mitsuru, sumo wrestler
