= Setouchi Volcanic Belt =

The Setouchi Volcanic Belt (瀬戸内火山帯) (SVB) is a Miocene volcanic belt in southwestern Japan.
