= Setouchi, Kagoshima =

Setouchi 瀬戸内町
- Town
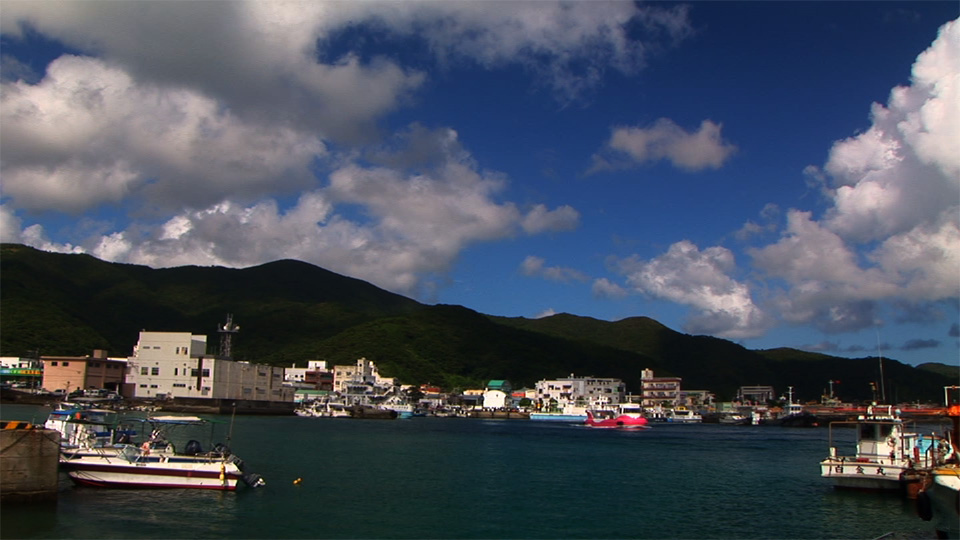
- Central Koniya Port

- Flag Seal

- Location of Setouchi in Kagoshima Prefecture

- Coordinates: 28°16′31″N 129°15′48″E
- Country: Japan
- Region: Kyushu (Amami Islands)
- Prefecture: Kagoshima Prefecture
- District: Ōshima

Government
  - -Mayor: Katsuomi Fusa

Area
  - Total: 239.92 km^{2} (92.63 sq mi)

Population (October 1, 2020)
  - Total: 8,546
  - Density: 35.62/km^{2} (92.3/sq mi)
- Time zone: UTC+9 (Japan Standard Time)
- Phone number: 0997-72-1111
- Address: 23, Koniya aza Funatsu, Setouchi-chō, Kagoshima-ken 894-1592
- Climate: Cfa
- Website: www.amami-setouchi.org
- Symbols
- Flower: Hibiscus
- Tree: Banyan and sago cycad

Setouchi (瀬戸内町, Setouchi-chō) is a town located primarily on Amami Ōshima, in Ōshima District, Kagoshima Prefecture, Japan.

As of 1 October 2020, the town had an estimated population of 8,546 and a population density of 35.62 persons per km². The total area was 239.91 km².

== Geography ==
Setouchi occupies the southern portion of Amami Ōshima, facing the East China Sea to the east and the Pacific Ocean to the west. It also includes numerous offshore islands of Amami Ōshima, including the inhabited islands of Kakeromajima, Ukejima and Yoroshima.

=== Climate ===
The climate is classified as humid subtropical (Köppen climate classification Cfa) with very warm summers and mild winters. Precipitation is high throughout the year, but is highest in the months of May, June and September. The area is subject to frequent typhoons.

Climate data for Port Koniya (1991−2020 normals, extremes 1977−present)
Month	Jan	Feb	Mar	Apr	May	Jun	Jul	Aug	Sep	Oct	Nov	Dec	Year
Record high °C (°F)	26.4 (79.5)	24.7 (76.5)	26.7 (80.1)	27.7 (81.9)	30.1 (86.2)	33.0 (91.4)	34.6 (94.3)	34.4 (93.9)	33.3 (91.9)	31.8 (89.2)	29.2 (84.6)	27.0 (80.6)	34.6 (94.3)
Mean daily maximum °C (°F)	18.1 (64.6)	18.5 (65.3)	20.3 (68.5)	22.7 (72.9)	25.6 (78.1)	28.3 (82.9)	31.0 (87.8)	31.3 (88.3)	30.2 (86.4)	27.4 (81.3)	23.8 (74.8)	20.0 (68.0)	24.8 (76.6)
Daily mean °C (°F)	15.3 (59.5)	15.6 (60.1)	17.4 (63.3)	19.9 (67.8)	22.8 (73.0)	25.8 (78.4)	28.4 (83.1)	28.5 (83.3)	27.3 (81.1)	24.4 (75.9)	21.0 (69.8)	17.2 (63.0)	22.0 (71.5)
Mean daily minimum °C (°F)	12.5 (54.5)	12.7 (54.9)	14.5 (58.1)	17.0 (62.6)	20.2 (68.4)	23.8 (74.8)	26.3 (79.3)	26.3 (79.3)	24.9 (76.8)	21.8 (71.2)	18.3 (64.9)	14.4 (57.9)	19.4 (66.9)
Record low °C (°F)	4.6 (40.3)	5.7 (42.3)	4.8 (40.6)	6.8 (44.2)	13.4 (56.1)	16.7 (62.1)	20.6 (69.1)	21.4 (70.5)	18.2 (64.8)	14.7 (58.5)	10.5 (50.9)	6.4 (43.5)	4.6 (40.3)
Average precipitation mm (inches)	123.4 (4.86)	116.4 (4.58)	170.3 (6.70)	192.7 (7.59)	237.7 (9.36)	395.9 (15.59)	180.0 (7.09)	248.2 (9.77)	273.4 (10.76)	194.6 (7.66)	133.1 (5.24)	102.3 (4.03)	2,375.2 (93.51)
Average precipitation days (≥ 1.0 mm)	12.4	11.4	13.4	12.4	13.2	14.6	10.3	13.4	13.5	10.7	9.3	11.1	145.7
Mean monthly sunshine hours	83.0	79.6	104.1	118.6	124.4	98.1	186.3	186.3	152.4	147.7	121.9	93.8	1,492.8
Source: Japan Meteorological Agency

=== Surrounding municipalities ===
- Amami
- Uken

== History ==
Higashikata Village was established on April 1, 1908. It became the town of Koniya on April 1, 1936. As with all of the Amami Islands, the village came under the administration of the United States from July 1, 1946 to December 25, 1953. On September 1, 1956 Koniya merged with three neighboring villages to form the town of Setouchi.

== Economy ==
The town economy is primarily based on agriculture, with sugar cane and citrus horticulture as the main crops. Industries include shochu refining and commercial fishing.

== Transportation ==
=== Ports ===
- Koniya Port, with ferry connections to Kagoshima and to the other Amami islands.

=== Highway ===
- National Route 58

== Noted people from Setouchi ==
- Ikue Asazaki – musician
- Meisei Chikara - sumo wrestler
- Chitose Hajime – musician
- Tadashi Kanehisa – folklorist
- Kenji Midori – Karateka
- Shomu Nobori - Russian translator
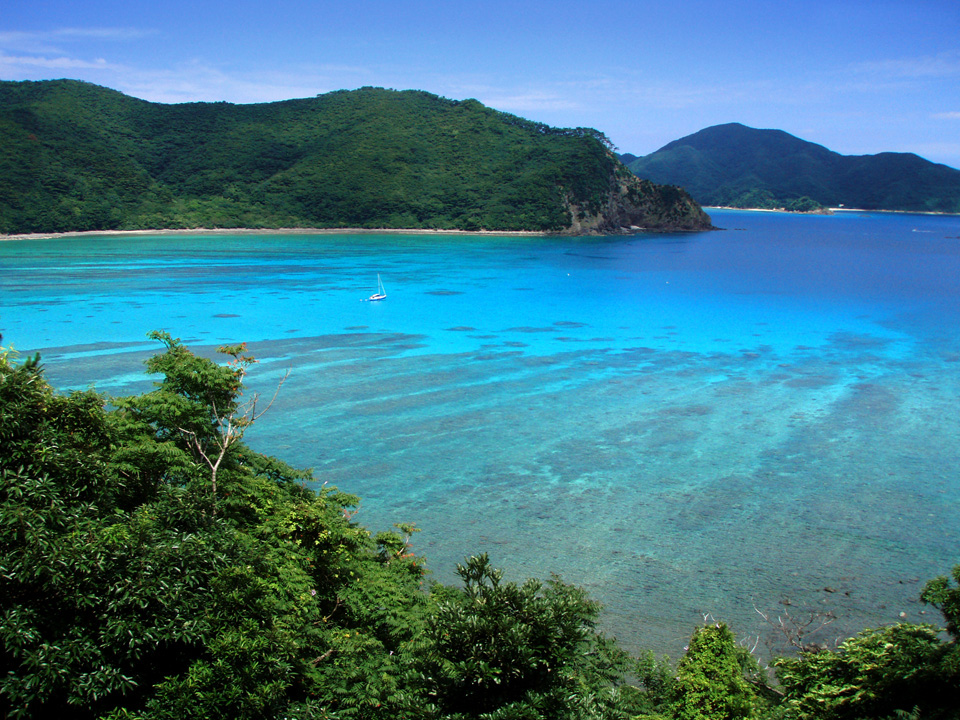
Katetsu cove from nearby Manenzaki

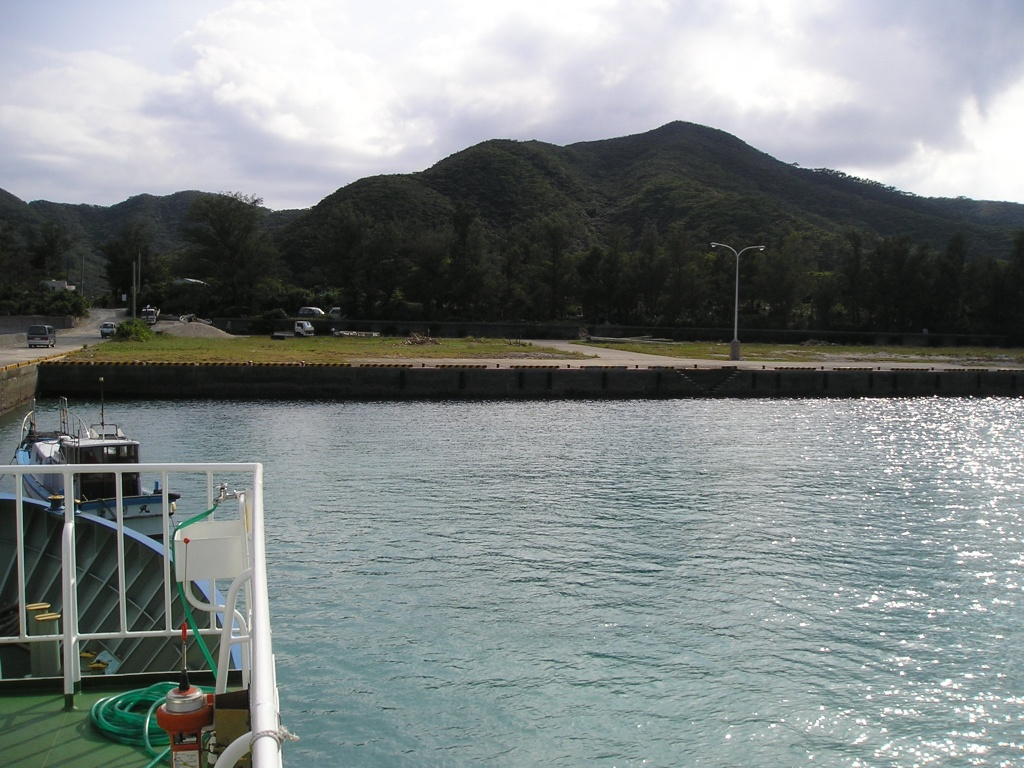
Uke Island

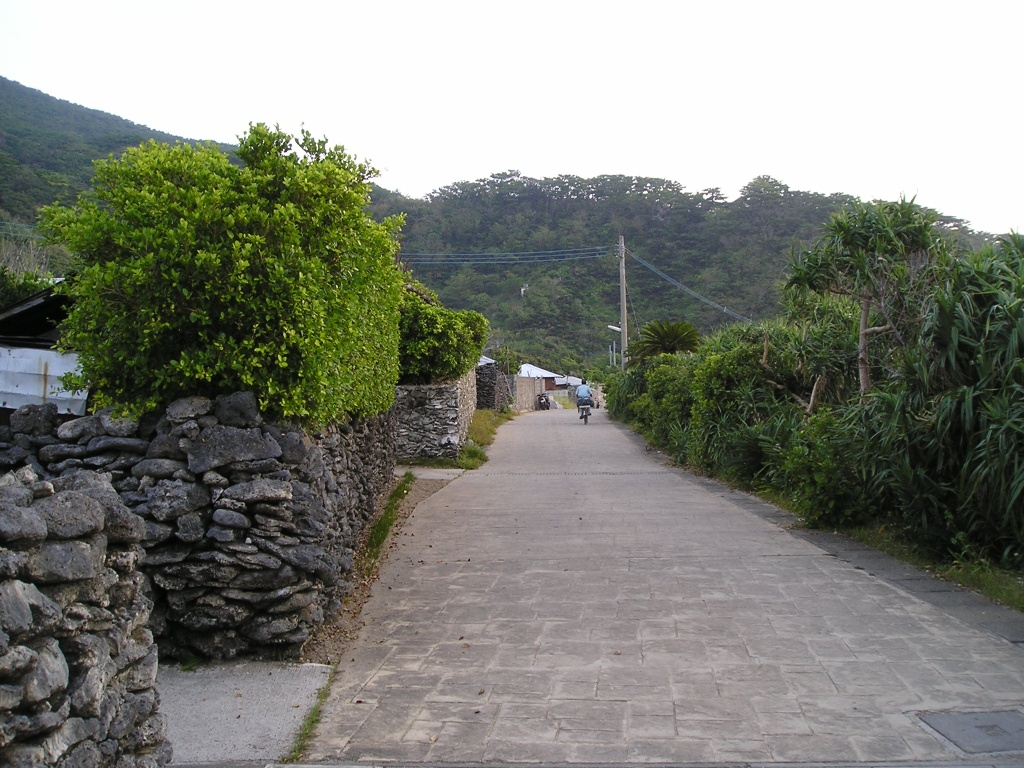
Yoro Island
