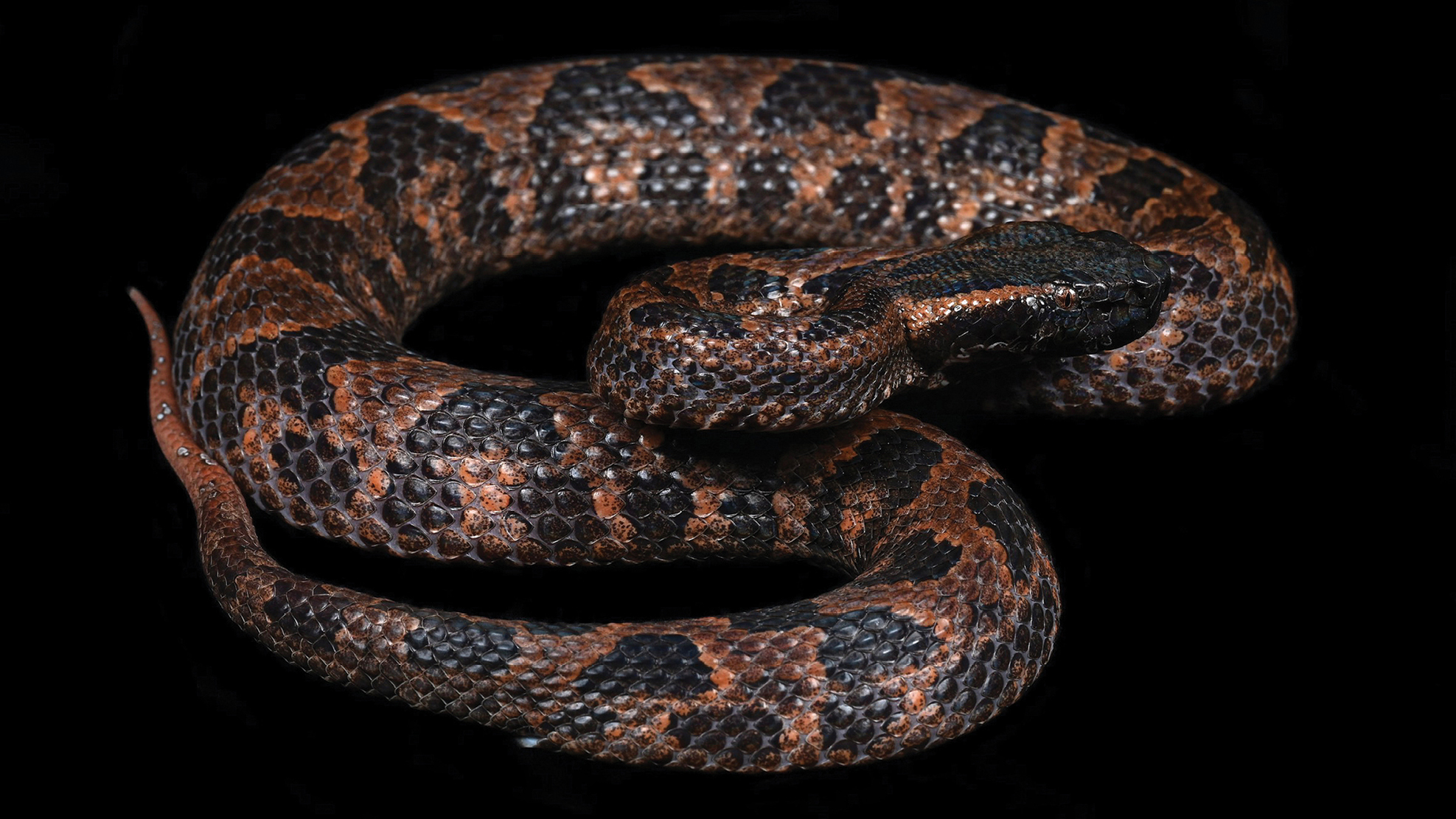
- Holotype individual in life

Scientific classification
- Kingdom: Animalia
- Phylum: Chordata
- Class: Reptilia
- Order: Squamata
- Suborder: Serpentes
- Family: Viperidae
- Genus: Ovophis
- Species: O. jenkinsi

Binomial name
- Ovophis jenkinsi Qiu, Wang, Xia, Jiang, Zeng, Wang, Li & Shi, 2024

= Ovophis jenkinsi =

Species of snake

Ovophis jenkinsi, commonly known as the Jenkins' mountain pit viper, is a pit viper species found in Yunnan, China.

== Taxonomy ==
The species Ovophis jenkinsi was first described in a 2024 study based on five individuals collected by Zhong-Wen Jiang and Xian-Chun Qiu in 2018 and 2023, all originating from Tongbiguan Township, Yingjiang County in Yunnan, China. An adult male (IOZ 002679) deposited in the Institute of Zoology of the Chinese Academy of Sciences was designated as the holotype of the species, while the remaining four specimens (consisting of two adult females and two juveniles) were designated as paratypes. The specific name jenkinsi honors herpetologist Robert William Garfield Jenkins, who aided snake conservation and management projects in China, and the common name "Jenkins' mountain pitviper" has been proposed based on this.

A molecular phylogenetic analysis conducted by Qiu and colleagues (2024) found that within the Ovophis genus, O. jenkinsi is the closest known relative of O. monticola, and that the two species are clustered with O. convictus. The results of the analysis are displayed in the cladogram below:

- - Vipera berus (Outgroup)
  - Ovophis
    - - Ovophis tonkinensis
        - GP 1665
        - KIZ 011602
    - - - Ovophis makazayazaya
          - YPX 53011
          - - GP 21
            - KIZ 02143
      - - - Ovophis zayuensis
            - GP 713
            - GP 1505
          - Ovophis malhotrae
            - ROM 39381
            - - GP 2041
              - GP 2053
        - - - Ovophis convictus
              - AM B628
              - - AM B580
                - AM B629
          - - Ovophis jenkinsi
              - IOZ 002679
              - IOZ 002680
            - Ovophis monticola
              - ZMB 70216
              - ZMB 70218

== Distribution and habitat ==
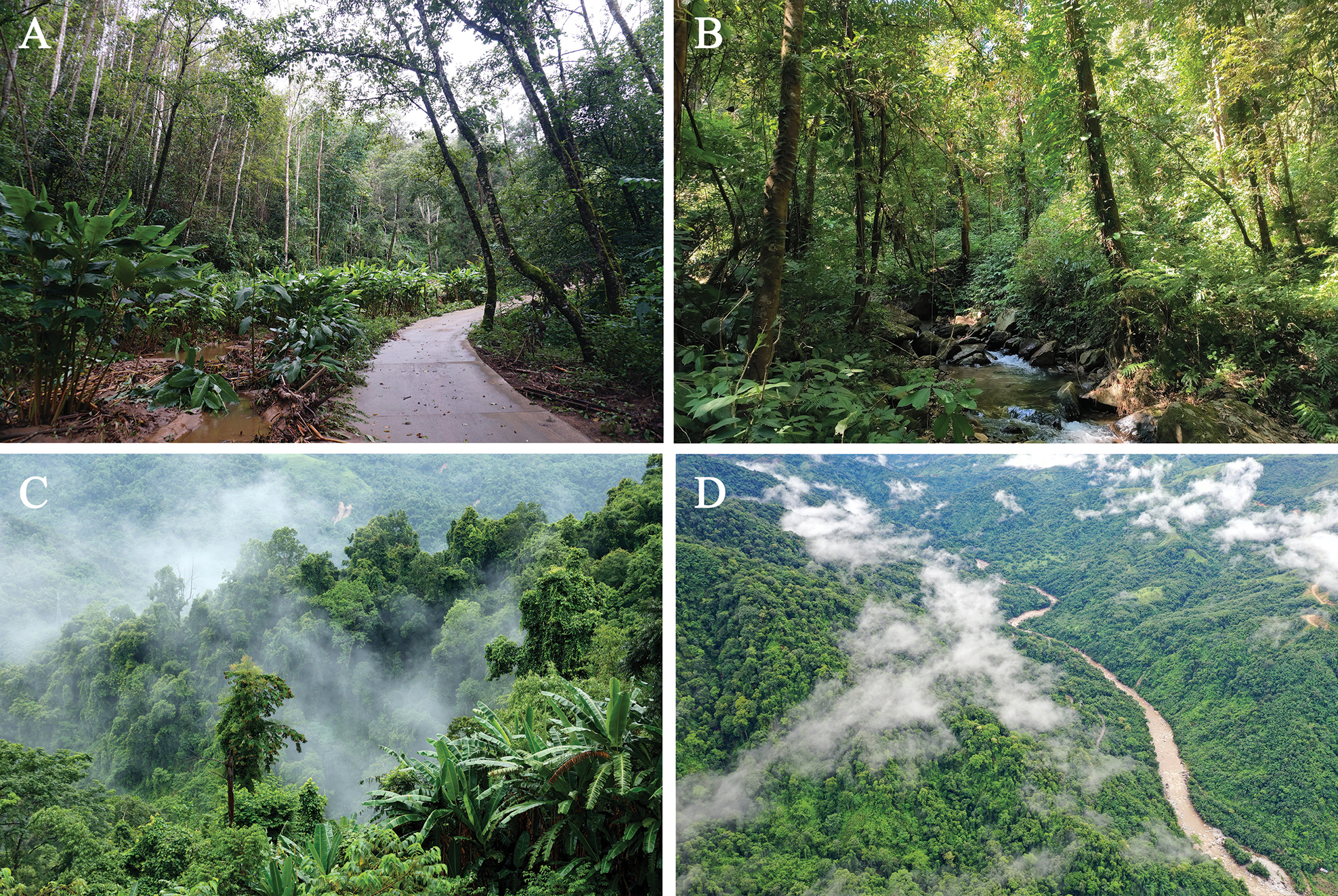
Views of the montane rainforest at the O. jenkinsi type locality in Tongbiguan Township

All known individuals of this viper were found in Yingjiang County, Yunnan, and it is currently believed the species is endemic to this region. This snake is found at altitudes of about 1,300 m (4,300 ft) in tropical montane rainforest. In this environment, it overlaps with other reptiles such as Lycodon chapaensis, Trimeresurus popeiorum and Pseudocalotes jingpo.
