= Nobori (surname) =

Nobori (昇) is a one-kanji surname from the Amami Islands of southern Japan. Notable people with the surname include:

- Shomu Nobori (昇 曙夢, 1878–1958), Japanese translator and educator

== See also ==
- Amami name
