= Amami Ōshima Fortifications =

Amami Oshima Fortress
- 奄美大島要塞 (Japanese)
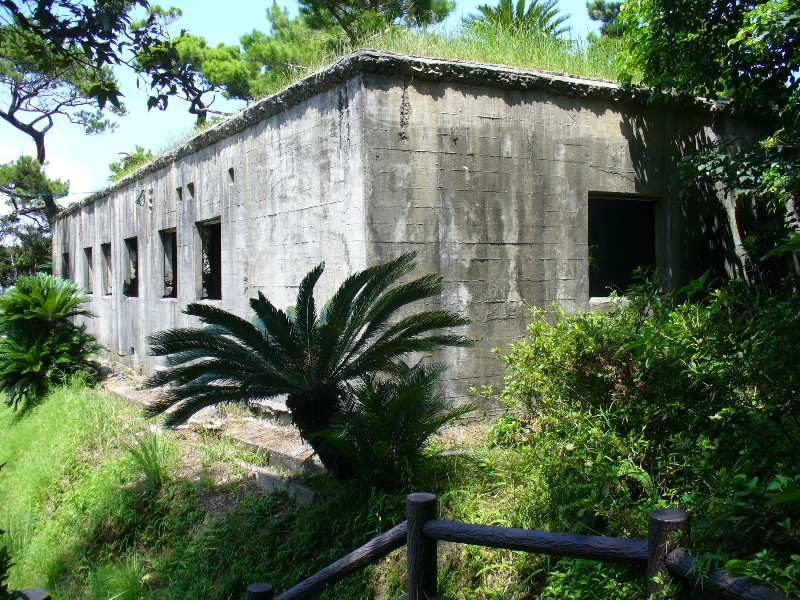
- Kanekotezaki observation post on Kakeromajima

- Location within Kagoshima Prefecture Location within Japan
- 28°09′07″N 129°18′43″E
- Type: fortification
- Location: Setouchi, Kagoshima, Japan

History
- Built: 1923
- Demolished: 1945
- National Historic Site

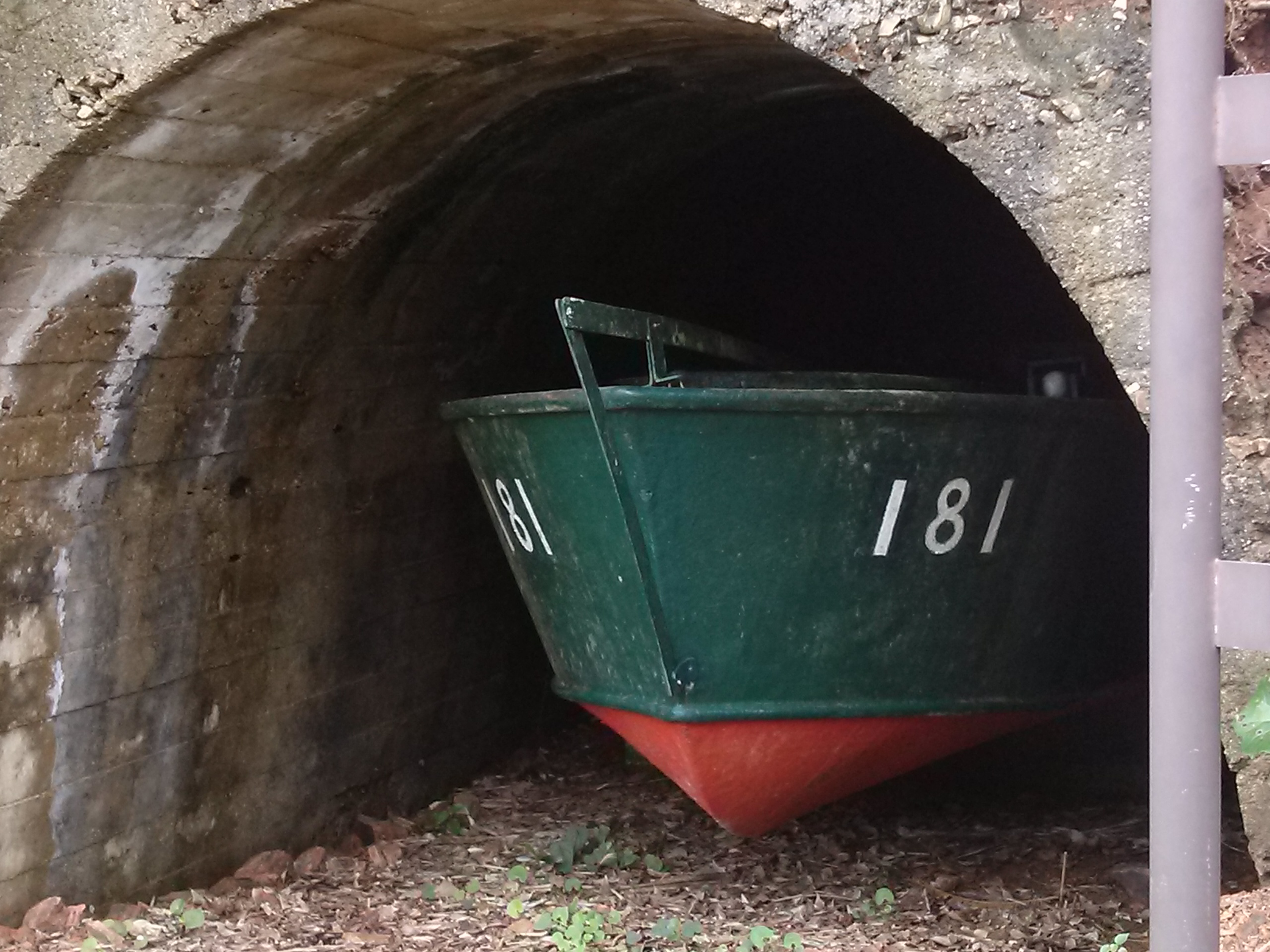
Shinyo base on Kakeromajima

Amami Ōshima Fortress (奄美大島要塞, Amami-Ōshima Yosai) was a group of Imperial Japanese Army coastal fortifications in the town of Setouchi, Kagoshima built to defend the Ōshima Strait between Amami Ōshima and Kakeromajima. Its ruins were designated a National Historic Site as the "Amami Ōshima Fortress Ruins and Ōshima Defense Unit Ruins, with Ōshima Supply Depot Ruins,".

== Overview ==
As tensions between the Empire of Japan and Qing Dynasty Empire of China grew in the late 19th century, Japan sought to strengthen its military facilities in the Ōshima Strait, a strategic waterway between the islands of Amami Ōshima and Kakeromajima in the Satsunan Islands (the northern part of the Ryūkyū Islands. In 1891, the Sasebo Naval Munitions Department constructed a coaling station in Kuji and after the end of the First Sino-Japanese War in 1896, built a water reservoir, using war reparations. In addition, the Sotsu Takasaki Lighthouse, Amami Ōshima's first lighthouse, began operation in 1896 to facilitate sea routes to Taiwan, which became Japanese territory after the First Sino-Japanese War. As Japan's relations with the Empire of Russia deteriorated due to the Triple Intervention and friction over interests in Manchuria, concerns increased over maritime defenses. In the Ōshima Strait, the "Kaitsukazaki Watchtower" was built at the eastern entrance to the strait, and the "Sotsu Takasaki Watchtower" was erected within the Sotsu Takasaki Lighthouse at the west entrance. As this was done just before the Battle of Tsushima in 1905. After the end of the Russo-Japanese War, the Imperial Japanese Navy conducted exercises and inspections in the Ōshima Strait, which it viewed as a possible fleet anchorage, but at this point a naval defense force had not yet been established.

The "Fortress Reorganization Guidelines" were approved in May 1919, followed by the "Defense Guidelines" in December of the same year. Amami Ōshima, along with Chichijima in the Ogasawara Islands and the Penghu Islands in Taiwan, was designated as a first-line fortress to prevent enemy forces from having a base near Japan in the Pacific. In August 1920, the "Amami Ōshima Branch of the Army Fortification Department" was established, and construction of the "Amami Ōshima Fortress" began in July of the following year. Due to the restrictions imposed by the Washington Naval Treaty of 1922, construction was halted, but resumed in 1923 with the "Amami Ōshima Fortress Headquarters" opened in Koniya. As a result, Amami Oshima became an important military base and the entire island became subject to military regulations such as the Fortress Zones Act and the Military Secrets Protection Act.

When the Marco Polo Bridge Incident triggered the outbreak of the Second Sino-Japanese War in July 1937, coastal artillery was installed in the Amami Ōshima Fortress and military preparations were strengthened. In July 1941, the United States imposed an embargo on oil exports to Japan. In September of the same year, a mobilization order was issued. The Amami Ōshima Heavy Artillery Regiment, the 28th Fortress Infantry Company, the Amami Ōshima Fortress Communications Unit, the Military Police Koniya Detachment, and the Amami Ōshima Army Hospital were deployed. The Navy also established facilities throughout the Ōshima Strait, including the Ōshima Defense Force Headquarters in Seso on Kakeromajima, the Naval Facilities Department in Miura, and the Naval Air Force Koniya Base in Sude. On December 8 of the same year, Japanese forces landed on the Malay Peninsula and launched a surprise attack on Pearl Harbor. After the outbreak of hostilities in World War II, Amami Ōshima became an important logistics base for southward-bound naval traffic. In April 1944, the Kikaijima and Tokunoshima Army Air Bases were largely completed, and in May of the same year, the Amami Ōshima Fortress Headquarters was incorporated under the command of the 32nd Army headquartered in Okinawa. In September of the same year, some of the artillery batteries in the Ōshima Strait were removed and relocated to strengthen the defenses of the Tokunoshima Army Air Base. In November of the same year, the 17th and 18th Navy Shinyo Units, special attack boats, were deployed. Around this time, US military attacks around Amami Ōshima intensified, with attacks on ships such as the Toyama Maru and Tsushima Maru and air raids on urban areas increasing. In 1945, the Kuniya Navy Air Base in Sue began to launch special attacks on Okinawa, and the 44th Navy Shinyo Unit and the 29th Army Marine Assault Squadron, which was unable to sail to Okinawa, were deployed there. Toward the end of the war, the Navy Shinyo-tai and the Army's Marine Volunteer Squadron conducted joint operations, but never deployed. Following the surrender of Japan the Amami Ōshima Fortress was dismantled, starting on September 25, 1945. Weapons, ammunition, and equipment that could be removed were dumped overboard, while gun batteries and other structures that were difficult to remove were detonated with explosives. Some remaining facilities were requisitioned and utilized by the U.S. military. Other facilities, including wooden barracks, were relocated to be used as schools and community centers, and some reinforced concrete facilities were demolished to extract their metal.

When the Amami Islands were returned to Japan, the munitions that had been dumped into the sea were salvaged by private businesses. At present, the Ankyoba Battery site at the eastern tip of Kakeromajima has been developed into the Ankyoba War Memorial Park. The Nishikomi Battery located at the westernmost tip of Amami Ōshima is also easily accessible to the public. This site features four gun emplacements where 28-cm howitzers were deployed, the remains of a gun magazine, and the remains of an observation post. The Tean Ammunition Depot Ruins Located near Koniya on Amami Ōshima, contains the remains of the central ammunition depot for the entire fortress, which was carved out of the mountain. The other batteries have reverted to a natural state with overgrown vegetation, and the presence of venomous snakes such as the habu makes visiting them dangerous.

In 2008, the "Ōshima Strait (Former) Military Facilities" were selected as a Civil Engineering Heritage Site by the Japan Society of Civil Engineers.

== See also ==
- List of Historic Sites of Japan (Kagoshima)
