= Yubanare Island =

Island within the Amami Islands of Japan

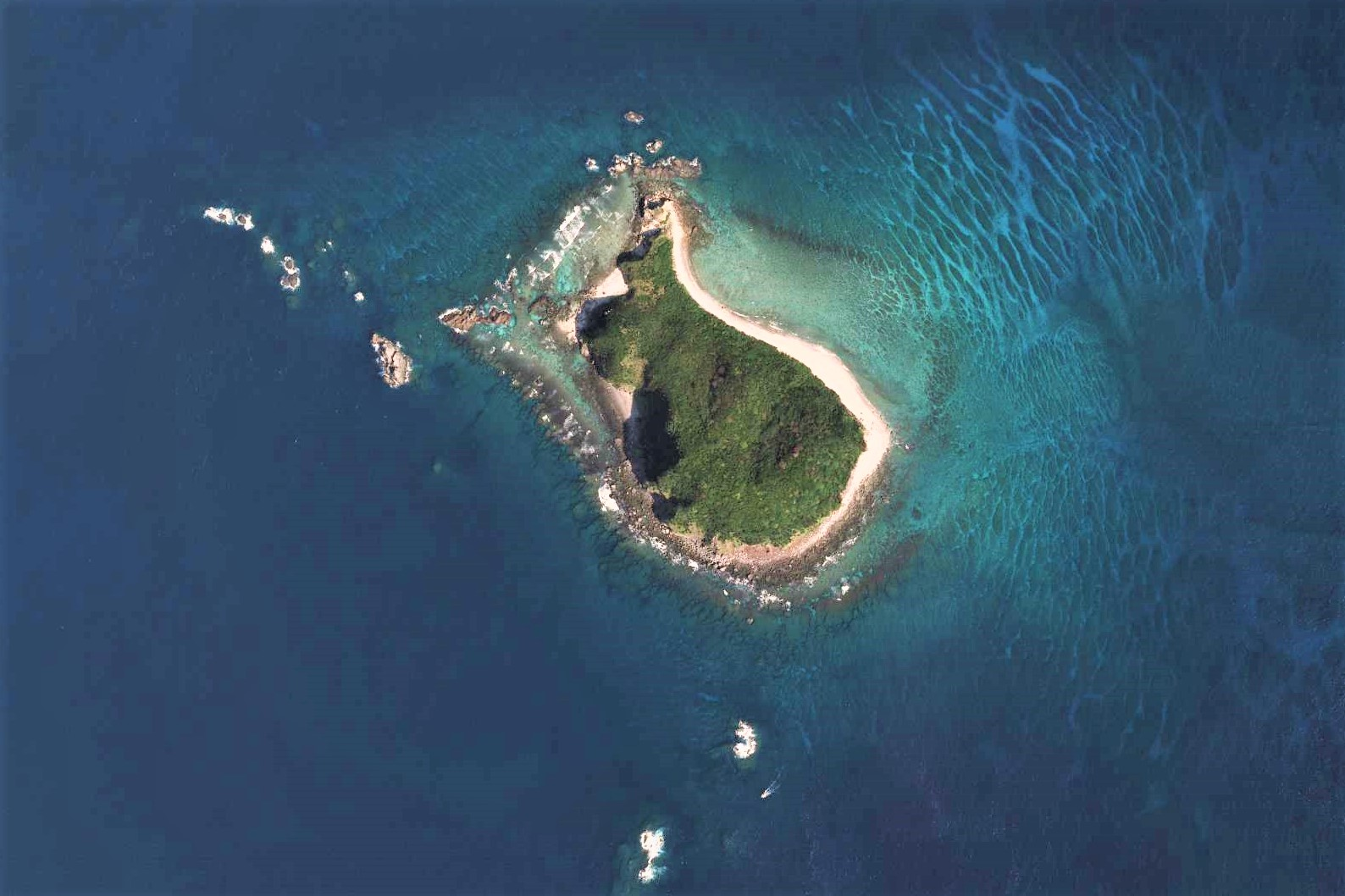
Yu Banare, aerial photograph

Yubanare Island (Japanese: 夕離島) is one of the islands of Amami Islands of Satsunan Islands, Japan, which is 1 kilometer to the northwest of Sukomobanare Island. It administratively belongs to Setouchi, Ōshima District, Kagoshima Prefecture.

The island is generally oval-shaped except for a minor protrusion at its northeastern end and its area is 0.15 square kilometer.

== See also ==
- Desert island
- List of islands
