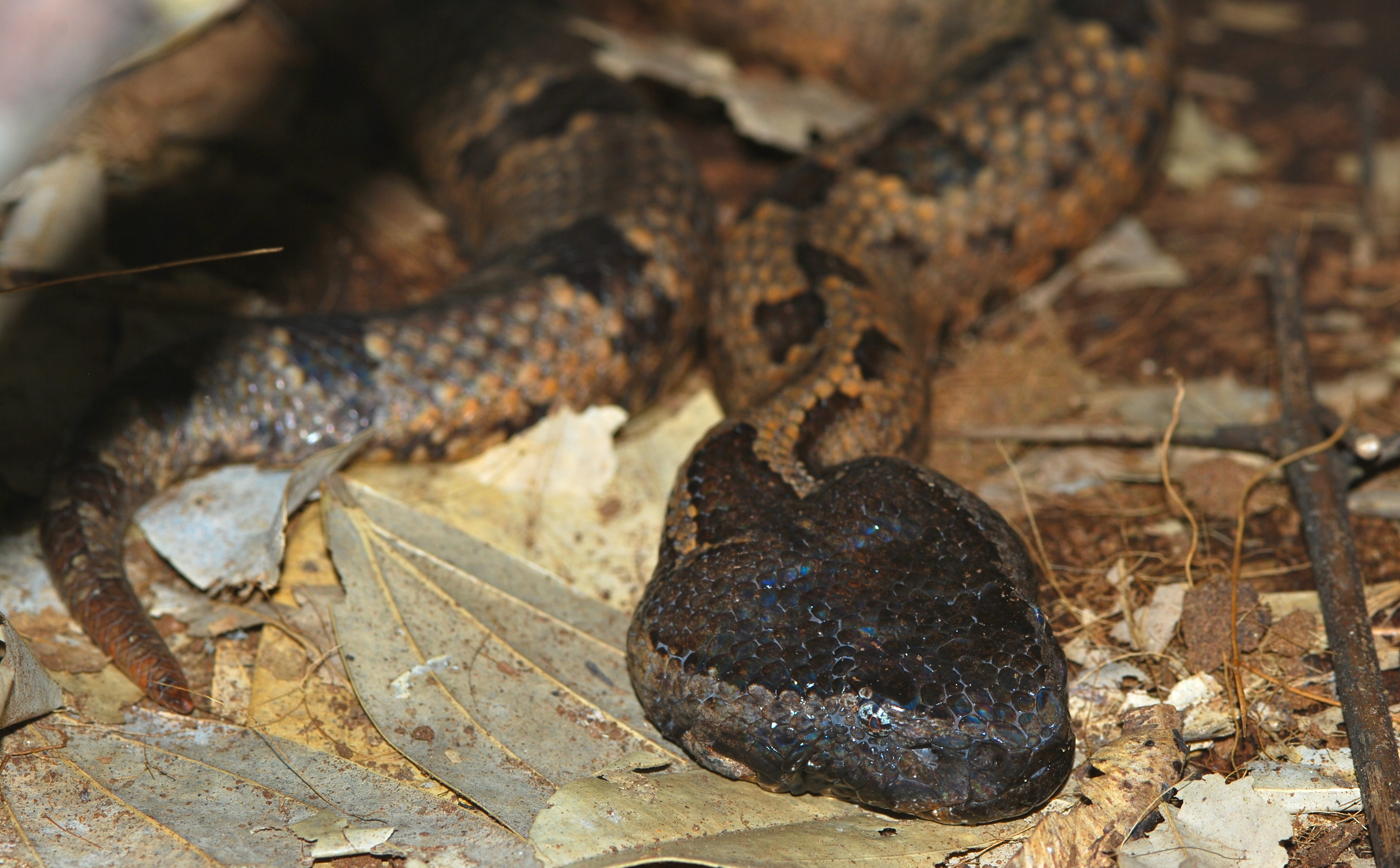
- Ovophis monticola

Scientific classification
- Kingdom: Animalia
- Phylum: Chordata
- Class: Reptilia
- Order: Squamata
- Suborder: Serpentes
- Family: Viperidae
- Subfamily: Crotalinae
- Genus: Ovophis; Burger, 1981

Synonyms
- Ovophis Burger In Romano-Hoge, 1981

= Ovophis =

Genus of snakes

Common names: mountain pit vipers.

Ovophis is a genus of pit vipers found in Asia. Seven species are currently recognized.

== Geographic range ==
Found in Asia in Nepal and Seven Sisters (Assam), India, eastward through Myanmar, Cambodia, Thailand, Laos, Vietnam, China, West Malaysia, Taiwan, Okinawa, Sumatra and Borneo.

== Species ==
Species	Taxon author	Subsp.*	Common name	Geographic range
O. anitae	David, Fretey & Vogel, 2024	0	Pingbian mountain pitviper	China and Vietnam.
O. convictus	(Stolickza, 1870)	0	Indo-Malayan mountain pit viper	Sumatra, Cambodia; Laos, Peninsular Malaysia, Thailand, and Vietnam.
O. jenkinsi	Qiu, Wang, Xia, Jiang, Zeng, Wang, Li & Shi, 2024	0	Jenkins’ mountain pit viper	China.
O. makazayazaya	(Takahashi, 1922)	0	Taiwan mountain pit viper	South-eastern China, Taiwan, and northern Vietnam.
O. monticola^{T}	(Günther, 1864)	2	Chinese mountain pit viper	Nepal, India (Assam, Sikkim), Myanmar, China (Zhejiang, Fujian, Sichuan, Yunnan, Tibet and Hong Kong), Taiwan, Cambodia, Thailand, Laos, Vietnam, West Malaysia, and Sumatra in Indonesia.
O. okinavensis	(Boulenger, 1892)	0	Okinawa pit viper	Japan (Ryukyu Islands: Okinawa and the Amami Islands).
O. tonkinensis	(Bourret, 1934)	0	Tonkin pit viper	Vietnam and China.
O. zayuensis	(Jiang, 1977)	0	Zayuan mountain pit viper	China and India.
O. zhaoermii	Liu, Hou, Mo, Li, Li, Luo, Rao & Li, 2025	0	Guanyinshan mountain pitviper	China.

*) Not including the nominate subspecies.
^{T}) Type species.

== Taxonomy ==
Species placed in this group have long been associated with the genus Trimeresurus. One other species that is included in some other taxonomies is O. tonkinensis (Bourret, 1934). It is commonly called the Tonkin pit viper and is found in Vietnam and China.
