= Vexillum yangi =

Scientific classification
- Kingdom: Animalia
- Phylum: Mollusca
- Class: Gastropoda
- Subclass: Caenogastropoda
- Order: Neogastropoda
- Superfamily: Turbinelloidea
- Family: Costellariidae
- Genus: Vexillum
- Species: V. yangi

Binomial name
- Vexillum yangi Huang, 2017

Species of gastropod

Vexillum yangi is a species of sea snail, a marine gastropod mollusk, in the family Costellariidae, the ribbed miters.

== Description ==
The length of the shell attains 4.2 mm.

== Distribution ==
This species occurs in the following locations:

- Amami Island, Japan
- Taiwan
