= Amami name =

As Japanese citizens, people of the Amami Islands presently only have family names (surnames) and given names. They are known for many unique one-character surnames that date back to the Edo period. A survey on telephone directories of 2002 shows that 21.5% of the residents of the Amami Islands have one-character surnames. Famous people with one-character surnames include Atari (中) Kōsuke, Hajime (元) Chitose and Nobori (昇) Shomu.

== Background ==
Although the Amami Islands are now part of Kagoshima Prefecture in the Kyūshū region, the inhabitants share much cultural heritage with Okinawans to the south. However, they were controlled by different polities for a much longer time. The Amami Islands were relatively late in being conquered by the Okinawa-based Ryūkyū Kingdom, and Ryūkyū's direct control lasted for about 150 years. In 1609, Satsuma Domain of southern Kyūshū invaded Ryūkyū, forcing the kingdom to cede the Amami Islands. Thereafter Amami and Okinawan naming systems separately underwent great changes. Today they are distinct from each other.

== One-character surnames ==
During the Edo period, surnames were considered a privilege of the samurai class, together with the right to wear swords. As all islanders were treated as commoners by Satsuma, they were forbidden to use surnames. With Satsuma's financial deterioration, however, some wealthy islanders were given an honorary rank of gōshi-kaku or quasi-rural samurai in exchange for their financial contributions to the domain. They were allowed to use surnames but forbidden from wearing swords. They were also ordered to maintain their Ryukyuan-looking appearance.

In 1726 Tabata Sabunji (田畑佐文仁) of Amami Ōshima became the first islander to be allowed to use a surname in recognition of his development of new rice fields. The second one was Miyazato (宮里) of Kikai Island, who was given the surname of Sumie (澄江) around 1746 because he received education at his own expense to become a Chinese interpreter. His rank was non-hereditary and the surname was not succeeded by his descendants. The third man was Minesumi (嶺澄) of Tokunoshima, who was given the surname Sunamori (砂守) in 1761 for increased production of sugarcane.

The first three examples were all two-character surnames that were prevailing in mainland Japan. The situation changed in 1783 when the one-character surname Shi (芝) was given to Saneo (実雄) from a wealthy family of Amami Ōshima. According to a record of the Shi family, the ruler of Satsuma Shimazu Shigehide initially opposed to allowing islanders to use surnames. After a persuasion by a chief officer, he decided instead to give one-character surnames to dissimilate islanders from mainlanders. Shi was named after a village in his hometown in modern-day Setouchi. This new policy forced Tabata and Sunamori to rename their surnames. They chose Ryū (龍) and I (伊) after their hometowns Tatsugō (龍郷) and Isen (伊仙) respectively.

Historian Yuge Masami considers that this peculiar policy was part of Satsuma's effort to strengthen camouflage against China. To secure Ryūkyū's diplomatic relation with China, Satsuma concealed its presence in the kingdom from China. Its policy to make Ryūkyū look un-Japanese was one of its camouflage attempts. While Amami was under direct control of Satsuma in reality, it was disguised as Ryūkyū's domain when China was involved. That was the reason why people of Amami were also ordered to maintain a Ryukyuan-looking appearance. In the 18th century Satsuma strengthened the camouflage policy. It banned the use of Japanese-looking given names (e.g. -jūrō (十郎) and -bee (兵衛)). As islanders were sometimes drifted to China, Satsuma even provided a list of potential questions and answers on Chinese inquiry. One-character surnames would be parallel with Ryūkyū's kara-nā or Chinese-style names that were used by Ryūkyū's officials in diplomatic contacts with China. It may be worth noting that in domestic affairs Ryūkyū's Yukatchu used two- or three-character toponyms as their family names (kamei), which had no Amami equivalent.

The number of gōshi-kaku families increased in the 19th century. The reasons of promotion were mostly related to sugarcane production. On Okinoerabu Island, offspring of Satsuma officials and their native wives tended to pick one character from the officials' names.

== Modernization ==
Before the Meiji period, surnames were an honor given to a limited number of families. As of 1852, only 1.8% of the total population of Amami had surnames. In 1875 surnames were extended to all citizens. For historical reasons, many people seem to have adopted one-character surnames. With increasing contacts with mainland Japan, however, many islanders felt it inconvenient to use their peculiar surnames as they were often misidentified as Chinese or Koreans and met discrimination. For example, Kanai Masao, a leader of the Amami reversion movement (1946–53), changed his surname from the one-character Kanae (称) to the ordinary-looking Kanai (金井). Some changed their surnames to two-character ones when Amami was under U.S. military occupation (1945–53).

== Others ==
Names used in unofficial occasions are poorly studied. The following is based on a field study in the Yamato Village of Amami Ōshima.

Each household had a house name (jaanunaa) after a place name, a geographical feature or its relative position in the lineage. For example, a branch family built a new house and thereafter was called miija (new house). Among villagers, house names were used more often than family names.

A man used to have a childhood name (warabïna) and an adult name (nesena) while a female had one given name. An adult name was adopted usually at the age 15, but the childhood name was used more often in daily life. It was not uncommon to assume an ancestor's name or to inherit one character from him. In the case of the Futori (太) family, most of the heads of the family succeeded the name Miwara (三和良). Adult names were also called school names as they were used primarily in school. Nicknames were usually based on physical appearance, e.g. huugamachi (Bighead) and aNchïra (Horseface).
