= Sukomobanare Island =

Island within the Amami Islands of Japan

Sukomobanare
須子茂離島
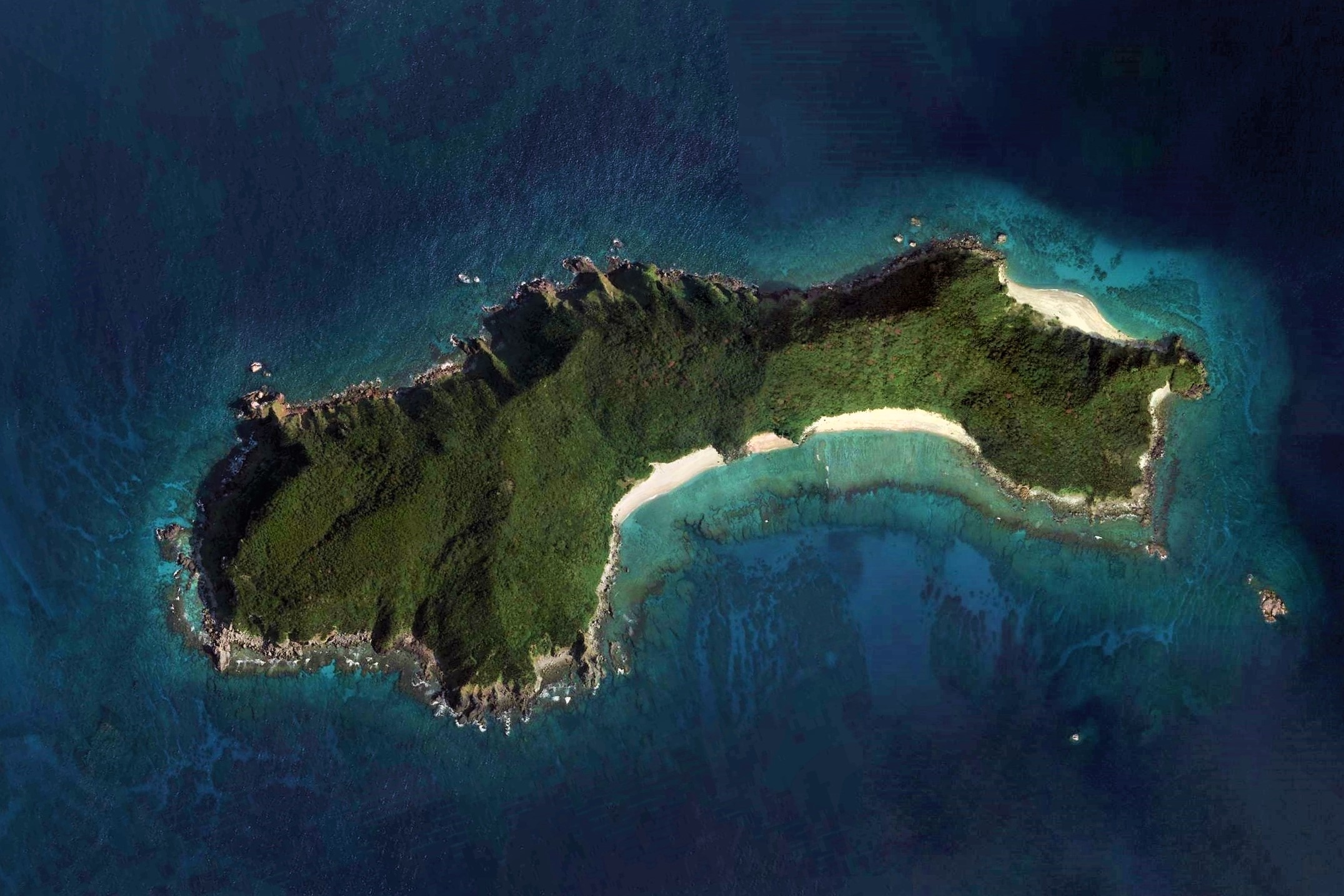
- Aerial view of Sukomobanare in 2008

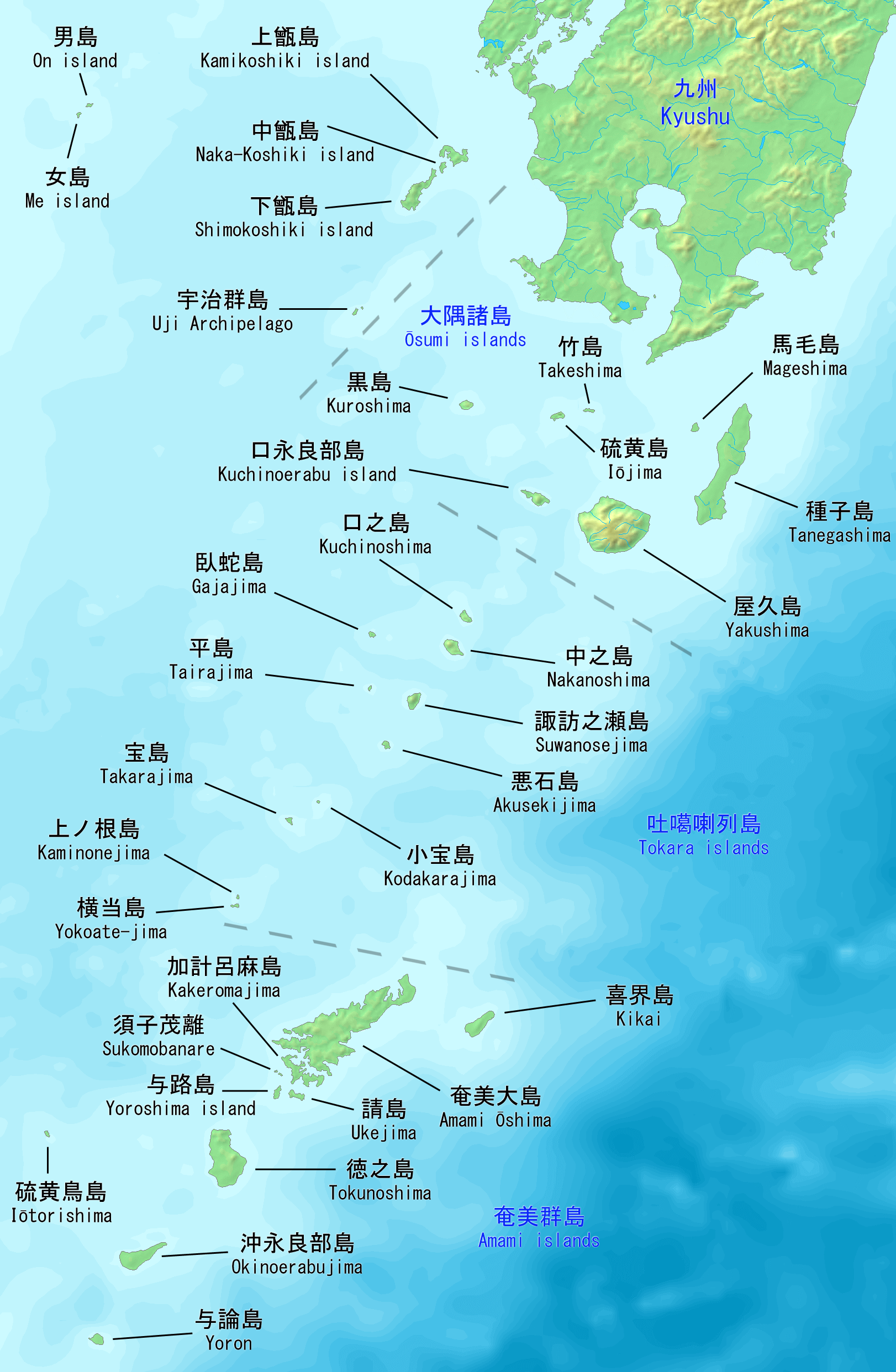

Geography
- Location: East China Sea
- Coordinates: 28°07′06″N 129°10′07″E
- Archipelago: Amami Islands
- Highest elevation: 152 m (499 ft)

Administration
- Japan
- Prefectures: Kagoshima Prefecture
- District: Ōshima District

Demographics
- Ethnic groups: Ryukyuan, Japanese

Sukomobanare Island (須子茂離島) is one of the islands of Amami Islands of Satsunan Islands, Japan, administratively belongs to Setouchi, Ōshima District, Kagoshima Prefecture. It is about 6.4 kilometers from south of Eniyabanare Island, and about 5.6 kilometers southwest of Sukomo Village on western Kakeroma Island. It is rectangular in shape with 2 kilometers long and 400 to 700 meters wide.

== See also ==
- Desert island
- List of islands
