= Governor Kanai =

Governor Kanai may refer to:

- Masao Kanai (1892-1979), Governor of Wakayama Prefecture
- Vicky Kanai, Governor of Airai
