= Masao Kanai =

Japanese judge, attorney and politician

- 金井 正夫
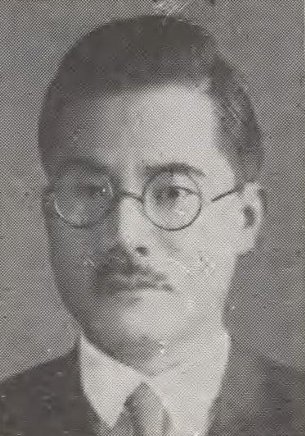
- Kanai in 1937

Governor of Wakayama Prefecture
- In office 25 January 1946 – 8 June 1946
- Monarch: Hirohito
- Preceded by: Uichirō Koike
- Succeeded by: Wakichi Kawakami

Member of the House of Representatives
- In office 20 February 1932 – 18 December 1945
- Preceded by: Hisatome Yoshisato
- Succeeded by: Constituency abolished
- Constituency: Kagoshima 3rd

Personal details
- Born: 14 February 1892 Ōshima, Kagoshima, Japan
- Died: 4 October 1979 (aged 87)
- Party: Rikken Seiyūkai (1932–1935; 1937–1940)
- Other political affiliations: Shōwakai (1935–1937); IRAA (1940–1945); JPP (1945–1946); JDP (1954–1955)
- Education: Kyoto Imperial University

Masao Kanai (金井 正夫, Kanai Masao; 14 February 1892 - 4 October 1979) was a Japanese judge, attorney and politician. He was a member of the House of Representatives for four consecutive terms from 1932 to 1945 and served as the 35th governor of Wakayama Prefecture in 1946. He is known for his strategic leadership role in the Amami reversion movement.

== Early life ==
Kanai was born in Ura, Tatsugō Village on Amami Ōshima of southwestern Japan. He was the 5th son of Tōsetsu Kanae. His original name was Tōei Kanae (称 当央, Kanae Tōei). His one-character family name was typical of Amami Islanders but was later changed to ordinary-looking Kanai. The two were pronounced the same in his native tongue due to the merger of /e/ into /i/. He changed his given name to Masao in 1915.

Kanai entered Kagoshima Prefectural Ōshima Agricultural School, which was, at that time, the highest educational institution on Amami Ōshima. Having a drive for success, he moved to Tokyo for a transfer to Junten Middle School. He moved up to the Fifth High School. He chose the high school in Kumamoto because he wished to follow the path of Shinkuma Motoji, a renowned lawyer from his home village, Tatsugō. In 1919, he graduated from the Faculty of Law, Kyoto Imperial University. He worked for the Osaka District Court. He also gave lectures at Kansai University for 12 years while publishing several books on law.

In response to Shikuma Motoji's effort to form Amami Islanders' association in Tokyo, Kanai organized an association named Kansai Ōshima Gunjin Kai (関西大島郡人会) in 1924. He made a career move to a practicing lawyer in 1928 and moved his registration from Osaka to Tokyo in 1934.

== Political career ==
In 1932, Kanai was first elected to the House of Representatives, representing the Kagoshima 3rd District. He served for four consecutive terms until 1945. Notable positions during the 14-year career include Parliamentary Councilor for the Ministry of Railways and Committee Member of Tourist Industry, but he is best known for his role in the development of his home district, Ōshima District. He took a leading role in the formulation of a 10-year program to spur the development of Ōshima District, which passed the Diet in 1933 and went into operation in 1935. The program covered the improvement of Naze Port on Amami Ōshima and Kametoku Port on Tokunoshima. He also helped build two ships that were operated between Kagoshima, the Tokara Islands and Amami Ōshima by Jittō Village. The village gave credit to Kanai's initiative by naming one of the two ships as Kanato-maru (金十丸), the combination of the initial characters of Kanai (金井) and Jittō Village (十島村).

After World War II, Kanai was appointed as the 35th governor of Wakayama Prefecture in 1946 but was soon purged from the position for his affiliation with the Imperial Rule Assistance Association during the 21st General Election in 1942. The purge was in effect until October 1950.

In 1946, the Amami Islands was separated from Japanese administration by the U.S. military, giving rise to the Amami reversion movement. Exploiting his connections in the national political arena, Kanai took a leading role in the mainland side of the reversion movement. In 1951, he was chosen as the head of the Tokyo Chapter of the Amami Federation, a nationwide federation of Amami Islanders' associations, as well as Chair of the Reversion Movement in Tokyo Prefecture.

The Amami reversion movement reached its first peak before the conclusion of the Treaty of San Francisco on September 8, 1951, demonstrating that 99.8% of the islanders wanted an immediate return to Japan. The peace treaty, however, trampled on the islanders' desire as Article 3 of the treaty had the Amami Islands (together with the Ryūkyū Shotō) separated from Japan and potentially to be placed under trusteeship. While the Amami Islanders considered Article 3 entirely unacceptable, an abrogation of it was virtually impossible because it required approval from all of the 49 countries that ratified the treaty. However, Kanai realized that the U.S. would not place Amami under a trusteeship because it would give way to U.N. intervention. He anticipated that the U.S. would return Amami to Japan in two or three years. He telegraphed Hōrō Izumi, the leader of the reversion movement in the Amami Islands, and urged him to focus on an early reversion, instead of calling for the abrogation of Article 3. The Amami Islands were indeed returned to Japan in 1953 in a way Kanai anticipated.

During the reversion movement, Kanai worked on decoupling Amami from Okinawa because it was considered critically important for Amami's early return to Japan. While devastating Amami's economy, the U.S. military invested heavily in fortifying Okinawa and was highly unlikely to give up Okinawa any time soon. However, he felt regretful for the prolonged military occupation of Okinawa. In 1966, he published a memoir on the Amami reversion movement, which he thought formed a precedent for Okinawa's return to Japan.
