= Amami Communist Party =

Amami Communist Party 奄美共産党
- Founded: 10 April 1947
- Dissolved: 25 December 1953
- Succeeded by: Amami Social Democratic Party
- Newspaper: Popular Front
- Ideology: Communism

The Amami Communist Party (Japanese: 奄美共産党) was an underground political party on the Amami Islands. Founded during the American military occupation of the islands, it had a leading role in the movement for the reversion of Amami to Japan although at the final stage, it was purged from the movement. It was not entirely in sync with the Japanese Communist Party on this issue. The American military government (later the United States Civil Administration of the Ryukyu Islands) banned the party and raided their headquarters and several of their members' houses on 27 March 1950. The next day, 17 members of the party's leadership were arrested for "planning a riot" and subversion of the military government.
