= Shomu Nobori =

- Shomu Nobori
- Born: 17 July 1878; Shiba, Kakeroma Island, Japan
- Died: 22 November 1958 (aged 80); Tokyo, Japan
- Occupation: Translator
- Writing career
- Genre: Russian literature

Shomu Nobori (昇 曙夢, Nobori Shomu; 17 July 1878 – 22 November 1958) was the pen-name of a noted translator and educator of Russian literature in Taishō and Shōwa period Japan. His real name was Naotaka Nobori (昇 直隆, Nobori Naotaka). He also served as a special advisor to the Japanese cabinet on Russian and Soviet issues.

== Biography ==
Nobori was born in Shiba Village, Kakeroma Island, one of the Amami Islands in southwestern Japan. Although he was known for his intelligence in the island, he failed to enter Kagoshima Normal School in 1894. It was a desperate hope for higher education to follow an Eastern Orthodox Christian who happened to visit the island. He moved to Kagoshima Orthodox Church and was baptized there. He attended a school run by the Russian Orthodox Church in Tokyo where he was initially a seminarian, and he later worked as a teacher at the same school. Recruited into the Imperial Japanese Army during the Russo-Japanese War for his Russian language abilities, the war came to an end before he graduated from the Imperial Japanese Army Academy.

Despite the unpopularity of things Russian after the war, he contributed articles on Russian culture and literature to magazines and newspapers, and worked on the first comprehensive survey of Russian literature in Japanese, Roshia Bungaku Kenkyū ("Studies on Russian Literature", 1907). In 1912, he worked as an instructor at the Central Military Preparatory School, and from 1915 as a lecturer at Waseda University. He was also a professor at the Imperial Japanese Army Academy from 1916. In 1928, he traveled to the Soviet Union on the occasion of the 100th birthday of Tolstoy, and on his return to Japan was the acknowledged Japanese expert on Soviet literature and culture. His translations of various Russian authors from the 1930s and onwards cover almost all major authors in every period. He was awarded the Yomiuri Literary Prize in 1956 for his A History of Russian and Soviet Literature.

Many of his translations of Russian into Japanese, as well as his analysis and literary criticisms of Russian authors were later translated from Japanese into Chinese. Asia and Africa Today stated that Nobori "connects the achievements of Russian literature" with Gogol and Alexander Pushkin.

In the 1920s, Nobori saw the transition to the next generation translators such as Hakuyō Nakamura and Masao Yonekawa. Shifting his focus to Russian folklore studies, he published a number of books on folk songs, proverbs and fairy tales. Norori's son Ryūichi conjectured that Nobori's enthusiasm for Russian culture was driven by the apparent similarity between Russia and Amami.

Being inspired by Kunio Yanagita, the father of Japanese folklore studies, he worked on the folk culture of Amami. His first published work on this field was the Amami Ōshima to Dai Saigō (1927). He also engaged in songwriting in the motif of Amami. In 1934, he wrote the words to the Iso no matsukaze and Tsuki no Shirahama, which were composed by Minoru Mikai, a songwriter from Amami Ōshima. His lifelong research on Amami resulted in the Dai Amami-shi (1949). The bulky book was published by a small Kagoshima-based company despite the post-World War II economic turmoil. The difficult decision was certainly influenced by the occupation of Amami by the U.S. military, who showed its intention to separate Amami from Japan.

Nobori was one of leading figures in the Amami reversion movement. Despite ill health, he served in several important positions of the mainland Japanese side of the movement while in the Amami Islands, the movement was led by Hōrō Izumi. A highlight of Nobori's contribution was an open hearing of the Upper House's Foreign Affairs Committee in 1951, where he clarified Amami's identification with Japan. Ideology-free Nobori helped the movement focus on the ultimate objective of reversion without intensifying ideological differences within the movement. He witnessed Amami's return to Japan in 1953.

He died in 1958, and his grave is at the Tama Cemetery, outside of Tokyo.

== Publications ==
- Nobori, Shomu. The Great Russian Writer, Nikolai Gogol (露国文豪ゴーゴリ Rokoku Bungō Gōgori) was published in 1904.
- Nobori, Shomu. Dai Amami-shi (大奄美史, "History of Great Amami") 1949, Kagoshima.
- Nobori, Shomu and Katsumaro Akamatsu. The Russian Impact on Japan Literature and Social Thought. University of Southern California Press (1981). ASIN: B0006Y4HZY

== See also ==
- Japanese literature
- List of Japanese authors
