= Ovophis anitae =

Scientific classification
- Kingdom: Animalia
- Phylum: Chordata
- Class: Reptilia
- Order: Squamata
- Suborder: Serpentes
- Family: Viperidae
- Genus: Ovophis
- Species: O. anitae

Binomial name
- Ovophis anitae David, Frétey & Vogel, 2024

Species of Asian snake

Ovophis anitae, or the Pingbian mountain pitviper, is a species of mountain pit viper endemic to China and northern Vietnam. Like all pit vipers, it is venomous. Originally, O. anitae was named Ovophis malhotrae by Zeng et al. (2023), but was renamed as that name was unavailable. Both names are in honour of Dr. Anita Malhotra of Bangor University for her molecular biology work on Asian pitvipers.

== Description ==
Ovophis anitae is a wide, dark brown snake with a triangular head, ~6-6.5 meters long from snout to vent. It has a black marking on each side of its body, it is dark brown dorsally and on the sides of its head, with cream-orange stripes from its eyes towards its neck which contain light brown spots. Its tail shows small white spots on the dorsal side.

The Pingbian mountain pitviper is distinguished from its relative species by various scale morphologies.
