= Kiyama Island =

Island within the Amami Islands of Japan

Coordinates: 28.022°N 129.275°E

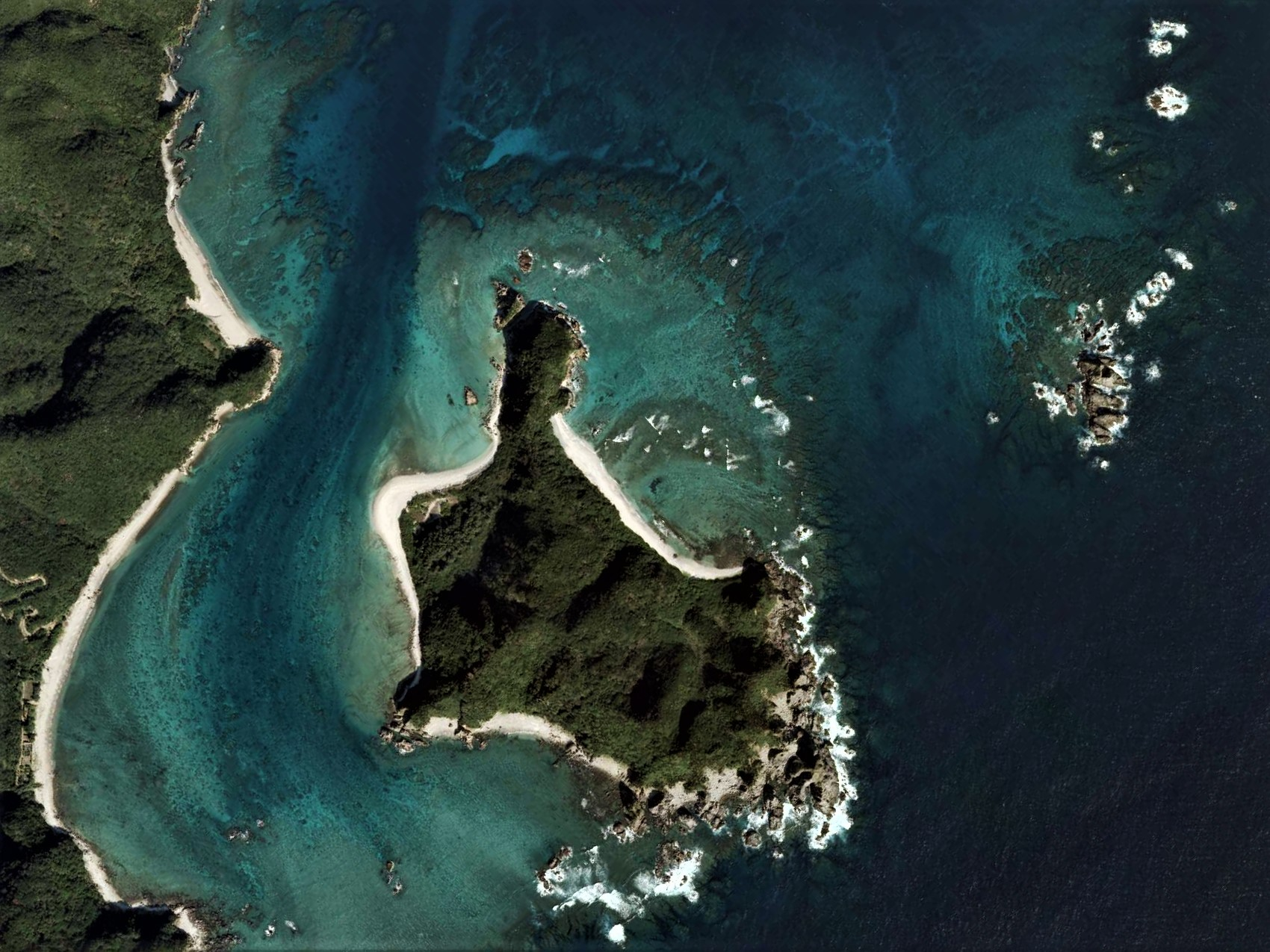
Kiyama Island in 2008

Kiyama Island (Japanese: 木山島) is an uninhabited island of the Amami Islands within the larger Satsunan Islands, Japan, administratively belonging to Setouchi, Ōshima District, Kagoshima Prefecture. It is just 300 meters from Ukejima and can be reached by a jeep track from Ukeamuro town on Ukejima. There is a diving and fishing spot and a beach on the island.

== See also ==
- Desert island
- List of islands
