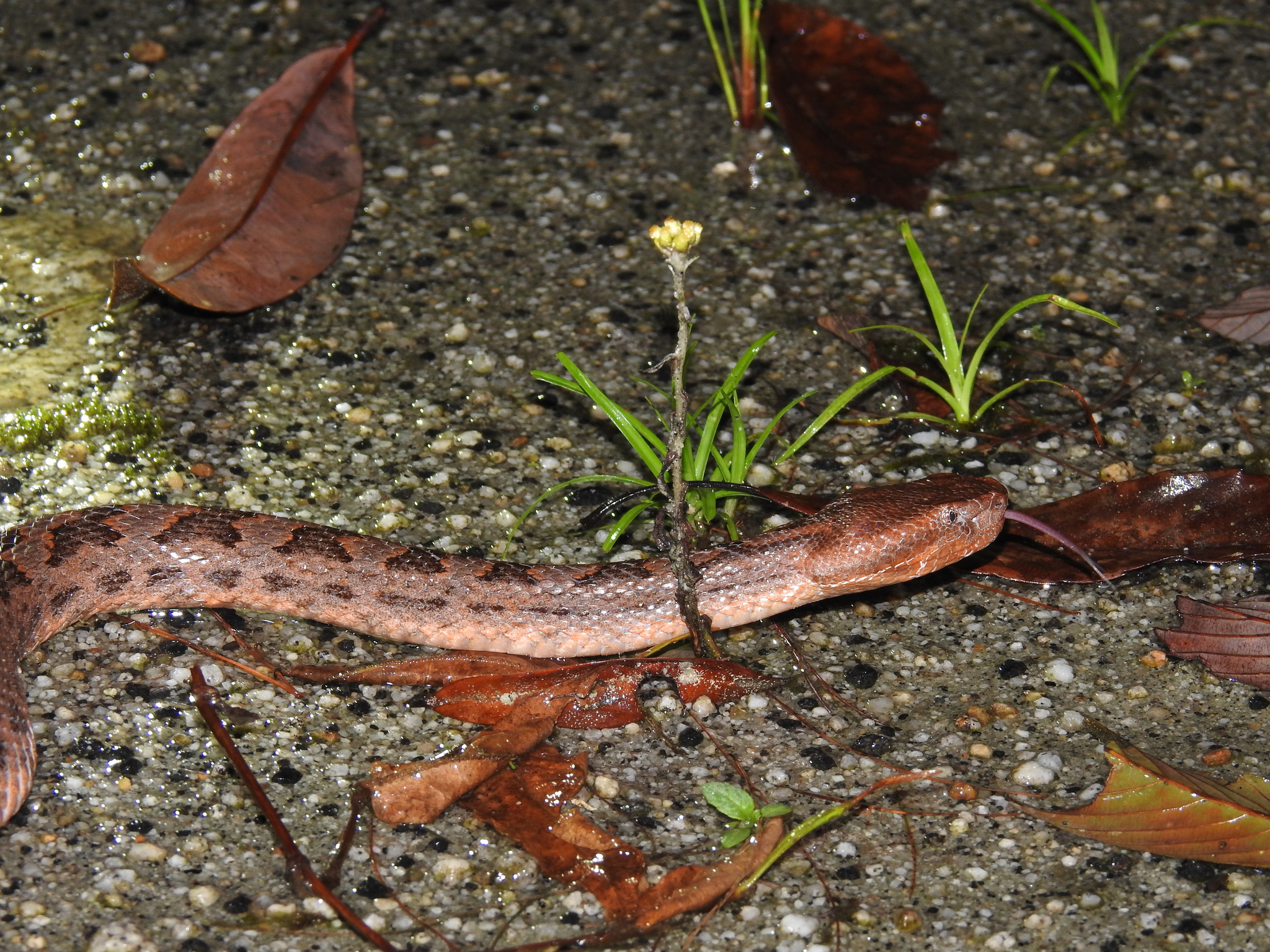

Scientific classification
- Kingdom: Animalia
- Phylum: Chordata
- Class: Reptilia
- Order: Squamata
- Suborder: Serpentes
- Family: Viperidae
- Genus: Ovophis
- Species: O. zayuensis

Binomial name
- Ovophis zayuensis Jiang, 1977

= Ovophis zayuensis =

Species of Asian snake

Ovophis zayuensis, or the Zayuan mountain pitviper, is a species of mountain pit viper endemic to China and India. As with all pitvipers, O. zayuensis is venomous. Originally, the snake was considered a subspecies of O. monticola, before being elevated to species level in 1995.

== Description ==
Ovophis zayuensis is a stout snake with a triangular head. Its ventral side is a plain pale yellow with no markings. The body displays black blotches which are progressively darker the further towards the tail they are.

The snake can be distinguished from similar species via its scale morphology.

== Habitat ==
The Zayuen mountain pitviper is known to prefer elevations of 1280-2100 m.

== Reproduction ==
Ovophis zayuensis is oviparous.
