= Amami reversion movement =

Sociopolitical movement in Japan (1946–1953)

The Amami reversion movement (Japanese: 奄美復帰運動, Hepburn: Amami fukki undō) was a sociopolitical movement that called for the return of the Amami Islands (and the smaller Tokara Islands to the north) from the U.S. military occupation to Japanese administration. It was mainly led by two groups: the Fukkyō, or Amami Ōshima Nihon Fukki Kyōgikai (Council for the Reversion of Amami to Japan) in the Amami Islands, and the Tokyo-based Amami Rengō, or Zenkoku Amami Rengō Sōhonbu (All Japan Federation of Amami Islanders Associations).

The reversion movement started in response to the so-called 2/2 Proclamation on February 2, 1946 in which the Supreme Commander for the Allied Powers (SCAP) showed its intention to remove the Amami Islands from Japanese control and to annex them to what it called the Ryukyus. The movement reached its first peak before the conclusion of the Treaty of San Francisco on September 8, 1951, demonstrating that 99.8% of the islanders wanted an immediate return to Japan. The peace treaty, however, trampled on the islanders' desire as Article 3 of the treaty had the Amami Islands (together with the Ryūkyū Shotō) separated from Japan and potentially to be placed under trusteeship.

The reversion movement stayed active although the treaty triggered a heated debate on whether to call for the abrogation of Article 3 or to call for a reversion within the framework of Article 3. Nevertheless, American historian Robert D. Eldridge shows that the reversion movement had a significant impact not only on the Japanese government but also on the decision-making process of the U.S. government. On December 25, 1953, the Amami Islands were finally returned to Japan.

Location of the Amami Islands

== Background ==
Amami has a complex relationship with its southern neighbor, Okinawa. Ethnolinguistically, the languages of Amami are closer to the languages of Okinawa than to the languages of Kyushu. Politically, however, Amami shares a much longer history with mainland Japan than with Okinawa. Fragmentary sources such as a Kamakura-period map of Japan and a set of documents created by Chikama Tokiie in 1306 suggest that Amami was within the sphere of influence of the Kamakura shogunate before the Okinawa-based Ryukyu Kingdom invaded Amami in the 15th and 16th centuries. In 1609, the Satsuma Domain conquered the Ryukyu Kingdom and put Amami under its direct control. After the abolition of the Satsuma Domain in 1871, Amami was transferred to the newly established Kagoshima Prefecture, whereas the Ryukyu Kingdom was eventually replaced by Okinawa Prefecture in 1879. The Amami Islands, the Tokara Islands, and the Upper Three Islands constituted Ōshima District and were politically and economically integrated into Kagoshima Prefecture. Amami's two key industries, the Oshima tsumugi (silk fabric) industry and the sugar industry, targeted the mainland Japanese market.

During World War II, the 32nd Army of the Imperial Japanese Army was in charge of defending the islands south of 30º10' north latitude (i.e., Tokara, Amami, Okinawa among others). Specifically, the 64th Independent Mixed Brigade defended the Amami Islands under the command of Major General Toshisada Takada. The Amami Islands were subject to U.S. aerial bombardments and submarine attacks but did not experience ground fighting. Since the headquarter of the 32nd Army on Okinawa Island was annihilated during the Battle of Okinawa, Takada's brigade was transferred to another army responsible for the defense of Kyushu. However, the U.S. Army superseded the Japanese military operation areas with its own operation/occupation areas: the 10th Army was in charge of islands south of 30º north latitude while the 6th Army controlled north of that line, even though the 30th parallel north was by no means a natural boundary but crossed Kuchinoshima, the northernmost of the Tokara Islands.

Harboring doubts about the U.S. occupation policy, the commanding officer, Major General Toshisada Takada, used his first opportunity to contact Joseph W. Stilwell, the commander of the 10th Army, to stress Amami's position within Japan. In his letter to Stilwell, dated September 3, 1945, he requested:

I long for your lending us your powerful influence over Amami Gunto problem not to make these islands "the second Alsace-Lorraine."

— Major General Toshisada Takada

In the process of disarmament, Takada made an objection every time the U.S. Army "incorrectly" referred to the Amami Islands as the northern Ryukyus. He insisted that the Amami Islands were not the northern Ryukyus but belonged to Kyushu and Kagoshima Prefecture. He successfully made the U.S. change the term to "north of Okinawa to 30º north latitude", "Oshima Gun" (Ōshima District of Kagoshima Prefecture), etc., although he was unable to correct the instrument of surrender he signed on Okinawa earlier on September 7, in which Amami was covered by the phrase "the islands in the Ryukyus". This episode is well known in Amami, and Toshisada Takada is still seen as Amami's local hero. Takada had his roots in Satsuma. His grandfather, Toshikane Takada, was stationed on Okinoerabu Island as an officer of the Satsuma Domain and had children with a local wife. Takada's relatives on Okinoerabu later led the reversion movement there.

== 1946–1950 ==
On January 29, 1946, the SCAP issued a directive to the Japanese government that administratively separated the Amami Islands from Japan and placed them under the Okinawa-based U.S. military command. Because the SCAP directive was announced over the radio on February 2, it is known as the "2/2 Proclamation". Two days later, the U.S. military cut out interaction between Amami and mainland Japan. American anthropologist Douglas G. Haring, who conducted field research on the Amami Islands in the early 1950s, used an analogy to explain a great shock to the people of Amami:

the people of the State of Maine might feel were they suddenly cut off from the United States and incorporated into French Canada.

— Douglas G. Haring

On March 14, 1946, the United States Navy Government of the Northern Ryukyu Islands was formed in Naze, the politico-economic center of the Amami Islands. The military government was transferred from the navy to the army in June. While the people of Amami had no power to prevent the occupier from imposing the label "Northern Ryukyu", they expressed resistance by translating the much-hated term as Hokubu Nansei Shotō (Northern Nansei Islands) in Japanese. The U.S. military government, for example, was translated as Hokubu Nansei Shotō Beikoku Kaigun Gunsei Honbu (the United States Navy Government of the Northern Nansei Islands). On October 3, the military governor renamed Ōshima Subprefecture to the Provisional Government for the Northern Ryukyu Islands, which was again translated as Rinji Hokubu Nansei Shotō Seichō in Japanese. In addition to the use of the term Nansei Islands, the fact that "provisional" (rinji) and "government" (seichō) were separated and placed at the opposite ends of the long phrase was seen as a sign of disaffectedness. The Provisional Government was renamed the Amami Gunto Government on November 25, 1950.

When movements toward a peace treaty started in 1947, people of the Amami Islands began to voice their ardent desire to return to Japan despite increasing oppression by the U.S. military government. On September 10, the unofficial Council of the Heads of the Cities, Towns and Villages (Shichōsonchōkai) unanimously adopted a resolution that clearly stated the collective will of the people of Amami for return to Japan. Military Governor Major Fred M. Labree, however, cracked down on the reversion movement by issuing Proclamation No. 13, which abolished Proclamation No. 5, which had guaranteed the rights of free assembly, speech, publishing, beliefs, peaceful association, and labor unions. His successor, Lieutenant Colonel Henry B. Joseph, even declared on October 4:

A military government is far from being a democracy. It is a sort of dictatorial politics.

— Lieutenant Colonel Henry B. Joseph, Military Governor of the Northern Ryukyu Islands

Although Joseph replaced Proclamation No. 13 with Proclamation No. 15, which clarified certain rights and liberties, he effectively banned gatherings, public statements and written materials critical of the military occupation. Because these basic rights were secured in mainland Japan by the new Constitution of Japan enacted on May 3, the oppression fueled the people's desperate desire to return to Japan.

The U.S. military occupation was a fatal blow to Amami's economy. The U.S. destroyed Amami's well-functioning politico-economic connections to Kagoshima City and severed access to the mainland market on which Amami's key industries depended. Moreover, the U.S. did not incur substantial costs to rebuild Amami's economy but focused its limited resources to construct military bases on Okinawa island. Leftist journalist Kōzō Nagata speculates that the U.S. intentionally destroyed Amami's economy to create a cheap labor pool for construction work on Okinawan military bases. American historian Robert D. Eldridge, however, attributes the catastrophe to gross incompetence and negligence at the U.S. military. Using declassified documents, he shows that in 1946, the U.S. naval military government on Okinawa correctly anticipated the politico-economic chaos the separation of the Amami Islands from Kagoshima Prefecture would lead to. Similarly, the G1 and Government Sections of the SCAP in Tokyo opposed the separation, citing a large burden and the lack of qualified personnel. Despite all of these warnings within the U.S. military, the separation was enforced, causing chaos to the Amami Islands as anticipated.

The food price crisis sparked public anger against the military occupation. On April 29, 1949, the military government directed a life-threatening threefold rise in prices for food distributed by it. It responded bureaucratically to the islands-wide protest, claiming that it had no power to change a directive coming from above in Okinawa. The provisional government sent a delegation to Okinawa in May, only to find the Okinawa-based military government's apathy toward Amami. The Zen Ōshima Seikatsu Yōgo Kyōgikai (All Ōshima Council to Protect Livelihoods) was formed on July 5, when a blank refusal of price reduction came from Okinawa, but it was banned on August 5. The U.S. Counter Intelligence Corps expanded a spy network on Amami Ōshima to counter the protest. Municipal governments continued to distribute goods at the old prices, but this got found out by the Okinawa-based military government in January, 1950. The Okinawa-based military government mercilessly forced the provisional government to pay for the loss in revenue. On January 24, the military governor finally announced a drastic reduction of food prices, but Amami's purchasing power was not recovered. The food price crisis marked the beginning of the mass mobilization of ordinary people, which soon turned into a full-scale reversion movement.

== 1950–1951 ==
International movements toward a peace treaty restarted in late 1949. Because people in the Amami Islands suffered from the military government's strong-arm tactics, the full-scale reversion movement was initiated by Amami Islanders in mainland Japan. On January 31, 1950, Yoshimi Kawakami, an Upper House lawmaker from Tatsugō on Amami Ōshima, questioned the fate of the Amami Islands, which was followed by another question on the same topic by Takaharu Itō, also from Tatsugō, on February 13. Both stressed historical, administrative, economic, and ethnic ties of the Amami Islands to Japan. Prime Minister Shigeru Yoshida responded positively by saying that although the Allies had the right to make a final decision, it was all right that the Japanese people expressed their hopes and opinions. The prime minister's statements ignited mass rallies first in mainland Japan and later in the Amami Islands.

On February 17, 1950, a youth association of Amami Ōshima in Miyazaki Prefecture launched the first street demonstration. In response, Miyazaki Prefectural Assembly adopted a unanimous statement that called for the return of Amami. In Kagoshima Prefecture, Vice Governor Takehisa Yasuoka (from Uken on Amami Ōshima), Shigehide Iwakiri, Vice Chairman of the prefectural assembly (from Naze), and Miyanobu Takeyama, president of a publishing company (from Wadomari on Okinoerabu), took initiative in the reversion movement there. On March 28, Kagoshima Prefectural Assembly unanimously adopted a petition to the central government. In March, the newly formed Tokyo Student Association of Amami Islanders organized a 45-day signature drive in Shinbashi, Sukiyabashi, Shinjuku, and other major districts of Tokyo. The nationwide activities were followed by the Tokyo-based Amami Rengō, which was founded on December 8, 1946, as an umbrella organization of Amami Islanders' associations. On November 15, the federation, in the joint names of Shomu Nobori, President of the federation (from Kakeroma Island), and Tadaichiro Tanimura, Head of its Tokyo Chapter (from Naze), petitioned to Douglas MacArthur, Supreme Commander of the Allied Powers, requesting that the Amami Islands be reunited with Japan proper as soon as practicable. The petition stressed the differences between the Amami Islands and Okinawa, noting that the Amami Islands did not belong to the Ryukyu Shotō but to Ōshima District, Kagoshima Prefecture.

Meanwhile, the reversion movement in the Amami Islands was initiated by youth associations. In response to the street rally in Miyazaki in February, the Naze City Federation of Youth Associations held a meeting on March 24, 1950, with the reversion movement as a hidden agenda. Its upper organization, the Amami Federation of Youth Associations, started mobilizing youth associations islands-wide, but the military government responded with harsh crackdown, arresting its leaders on March 27. The head of the organization was sentenced to six months' imprisonment with hard labor. Grown-ups acted more tactfully. The Social Democratic Party, led by Hōrō Izumi, developed a political narrative that insisted on the compatibility of reversion with the cooperation with the U.S.

On January 5, 1951, Prime Minister Yoshida took one step further from his remark last year, stating that the Ryukyu Archipelago (Ryūkyū Rettō) eventually would be restored to Japanese sovereignty because they had been Japanese territory for a long time and were not taken through invasion. On February 6, Nobori and Tanimura, together with two Okinawan representatives, attended a hearing of the Upper House, stating that 400 thousand of Amami Islanders in the Amami Islands and in mainland Japan had an ardent desire for return to Japan. They also stressed that Ōshima District was historically and administratively distinct from Okinawa Prefecture. The hearing was set to coincide with the special negotiator for the peace treaty, John Foster Dulles's visit to Japan. Unfortunately for Amami Islanders, the Dulles–Yoshida talks made it clear that the U.S. would keep Amami separate from Japan.

In the Amami Islands, the series of crackdowns generated a sense of helplessness, but in response to the reversion movement in mainland Japan, Iekuni Murayama, the founder and head of the newspaper Nankai Nichinichi Shimbun, floated a trial balloon by writing a carefully worded editorial on February 8, 1951, which concluded with the following sentence:

琉球が琉球の帰属について、アメリカへの気がねからその意思を偽るようなことがあれば、共に後代救われぬ悲劇に陥るであろう

If the Ryukyus hide their desire to return to Japan for fear of upsetting America, the future generations of both countries will find themselves in a tragedy from which they cannot be rescued.

— Iekuni Murayama, President of the Nankai Nichinichi Shimbun

Murayama prepared himself for summoning by the U.S. censor but to his surprise, nothing happened to him.

On February 14, the Fukkyō, or Amami Ōshima Nihon Fukki Kyōgikai (Council for the Reversion of Amami to Japan), was formed as an umbrella organization of 29 civic, youth, and media organizations. Hōrō Izumi, Chairman of the Social Democratic Party, was elected President of the council. The first project of the Fukkyō was an islands-wide signature drive, which by April 10, collected the signatures of 99.8% of all residents of the Amami and Tokara Islands over the age of fourteen. The results were forwarded to the United Nations, the Far Eastern Commission, the Allied Council for Japan, the SCAP, Foster Dulles, Prime Minister Yoshida, and the presidents of the Upper and Lower Houses of the Japanese Diet. The successful signature drive rocked mainland Japan.

In parallel with the signature drive, the assemblies throughout the Amami Islands passed resolutions calling for an early return to Japan. The series of resolutions was started by the Amami Legislature (Amami Guntō Kaigi) on March 26, which was established in November 1950, and was followed by the Naze City Assembly on April 4.

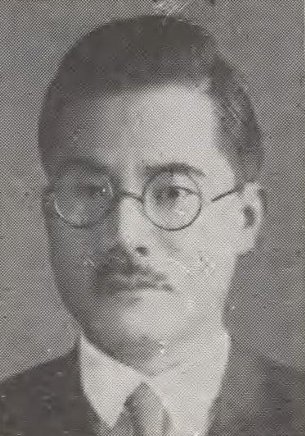
Masao Kanai, a former lawyer, judge, lower house member and Governor of Wakayama Prefecture, exploited his social network to craft an effective strategy for reversion.

The collection of signatures arrived in mainland Japan on May 13, and the news was reported nationwide. On June 2, a resolution concerning territory passed the Lower House, which requested the Allies to grant the wishes of the residents who feared separation from Japan. Former lower house member Masao Kanai (from Tatsugō) pressured the parliament to make the resolution single out the Amami Islands, but the resolution adopted in the end was a generic one covering not only Amami but also Okinawa and the Ogasawara Islands.

On July 10, however, the final draft of the peace treaty was reported over the radio, in which Article 3 stated that Japan would agree to the U.N. trusteeship with the United States as administering authority, of the islands south of 29º north latitude (i.e., Amami, Okinawa and others, but not Toraka). The Fukkyō responded quickly, organizing a mass rally in Naze on July 13. The military government ordered to call off the rally, but Horō Izumi and other organizers refused. With some ten thousand people waiting in Naze Elementary School, a meeting was held between Izumi, Governor Sanetaka Nakae, and Raymond C. Barlow, the commanding officer of the military government, where Izumi cautioned that if the rally was not allowed, the people would turn anti-American. After a one-hour negotiation, the Fukkyō was allowed to conditionally proceed with the rally. A second rally was held on July 19, where Governor Nakae, who earlier acted as a mediator, joined the call for the return to Japan.

On August 1, Horō Izumi started a hunger strike at Takachiho Shrine in Naze, which was followed by nearly all municipalities in the Amami Islands. The hunger strikes were reported worldwide. On August 6, the reversion movement decided to send a delegation to the mainland without permission from the military government. Three of the 11 member delegation were arrested in Kagoshima on August 10. However, the incident was reported with sympathy, drawing nationwide attention to the Amami reversion movement. On August 20, all the members joined in Tokyo.

In mainland Japan, the Amami Rengō lobbied the SCAP and the Allies to change the boundary of the 29th parallel north. The Amami Islanders in the mainland held street rallies in Tokyo, Osaka, Kobe, Kyoto, Kagoshima, Miyazaki, and Fukuoka. A signature drive in the mainland reached one million signatures in early August. The eleven representatives from Amami joined the campaign, pressured the Diet to pass a resolution specifically targeting Amami. However, the Diet was unable to pass such a resolution because it would conflict with a treaty the Diet was soon to ratify. As a compromise, Susumu Nikaidō, representing Kagoshima Prefecture, posed an "emergency question" on the reversion of Amami to Japan on August 18.

== 1951–1953 ==
On September 9, 1951, the peace treaty was concluded without modifying the boundary of 29º north latitude. The Tokara Islands were returned to Japan on February 10, 1952, but the Amami Islands remained under the U.S. military occupation although the treaty indicated that Japan retained "residual sovereignty" over Amami and other islands. While the reversion movement remained active, the treaty triggered a heated debate on whether to call for the abrogation of Article 3 or to call for a reversion within the framework of Article 3. The Amami Islanders considered Article 3 entirely unacceptable. At the same time, however, an abrogation of it was virtually impossible because it required approval from all of the 49 countries that ratified the treaty. The leftist groups, who also opposed the Japanese and U.S. governments, openly called for the abrogation while moderate/conservative groups sought a more realistic approach. Witnessing growing ideological differences with in the reversion movement, Shomu Nobori, despite ill health, attended a special meeting of the Amami Rengō on August 11–12, 1952, and called for unity for the sake of the larger objective.

Exploiting his political connections, former parliamentarian Masao Kanai realized that the U.S. would not place Amami under a trusteeship because it would give way to U.N. intervention. He anticipated that the U.S. would return Amami to Japan in two or three years. He telegraphed Izumi in Naze and urged him to focus on an early reversion, instead of calling for the abrogation of Article 3. It took some time for Kanai's strategy to be accepted by the leaders of the reversion movement. On May 28, 1952, one month after the treaty went into effect, the reversion movement in the mainland passed a resolution absolutely opposing a trusteeship and calling for the complete return to Japan. Similarly in the Amami Islands, a mass gathering adopted a resolution calling for the abrogation of Article 3 and the complete return to Japan. The Fukkyō launched the second signature drive that called for the two objectives. By November it collected the signatures of 99.9% of the residents of the Amami Islands over the age of fourteen.

In late September, the media reported that the U.S. ambassador to Japan, Robert D. Murphy, favorably considered the return of the Amami Islands. On September 29, however, the Mainichi Shimbun reported that Murphy referred to "the Amami Islands north of 27º50'" as the area to be returned to Japan, meaning that the southernmost islands of Okinoerabu and Yoron were to be separated from the rest of the Amami Islands. The news added fuel to the reversion movement on the two islands.

With the collection of signatures, representatives of the Fukkyō, led by Izumi, visited the mainland from November to December. Most notably, they met U.S. Ambassador Murphy and Prime Minister Yoshida. They were also given a "Christmas gift" by the Lower House on December 25, which passed a resolution that singled out Amami for the call for the return to Japan. Decoupling Amami from Okinawa was considered critically important for Amami's early return to Japan because the U.S. was highly unlikely to return heavily fortified Okinawa anytime soon. Surprisingly for the representatives of the Fukkyō, the mainland side had already shifted to Kanai's strategy, dropping the call for the abrogation of Article 3. In response to the concern from the mainland, the Fukkyō purged communists, from December 1952 to January 1953, to secure the path to the reversion.

On August 8, during his short visit to Japan, Foster Dulles announced that the U.S. desired to relinquish its rights under Article 3 over the Amami Oshima Group in favor of the resumption by Japan. On August 11, the U.S. Embassy clarified that the whole Ōshima District would be returned, without separating the southernmost two islands. The reversion groups both in the mainland and the Amami Islands were ecstatic with the news, but the initial enthusiasm soon turned to irritation and suspicion because the U.S. did not announce the date of transfer for months. In November, the Fukkyō even organized a mass rally and hunger strikes. On December 24, 1953, the two countries finally signed the agreement returning the Amami Islands to Japan. On the following day, the U.S. military occupation came to end in the Amami Islands.

== Impact ==
With a bitter memory of the U.S. military occupation, the people of the Amami Islands still occasionally oppose the label "Ryūkyū" imposed on them. For example, the World Natural Heritage site of Amami-Ōshima Island, Tokunoshima Island, northern part of Okinawa Island, and Iriomote Island was first added to the tentative list of nomination under the name of Ryūkyū Shotō in 2003. With strong oppositions from the Amami Islands and Kagoshima Prefecture as a whole, the candidate site was renamed Amami–Ryukyu before changing to the current, more descriptive name in 2017.

Even before the U.S. military occupation, the Amami Islanders identified themselves as "Japanese to the bone" (Sanetaka Nakae, Governor of Amami Gunto), but the alien military occupation fueled the nationalistic sentiment. It accelerated the education of Standard Japanese before the re-evaluation of local speeches started in the 1980s. By contrast, the Amami Islanders felt a sense of difference with regard to their southern neighbor, Okinawans, and the reversion movement strengthened the self-perception. From beginning to end, the reversion movement stressed that the Amami Islands did not belong to the Ryukyu Shotō but to Ōshima District, Kagoshima Prefecture. As the U.S. expanded military based on Okinawa, the decoupling was increasingly considered important for Amami's early return to Japan.

Because the U.S. military occupation destroyed Amami's economy, numerous Amami Islanders had to leave the islands to work in Okinawa. At the time of Amami's reversion, some 70 thousand Amami Islanders stayed on Okinawa, where they faced discrimination from Okinawans, who saw Amami Islanders as potential criminals and prostitutes. On April 1, 1952, the U.S. set up the centralized Ryukyu Government on Okinawa, intensifying Okinawa's politico-economic subjugation of Amami, but when Amami returned to Japan on December 25, 1953, the Okinawan society, with support from the U.S. military, suddenly launched the "anti-Amami purge". Civil service employees from Amami were laid off, and every request from Amami to facilitate administrative transfer was rejected by the Ryukyu Government. Amami Islanders' traumatic experience on Okinawa widened the psychological gap between the two groups.

== See also ==
- 1971 Okinawa Reversion Agreement
