= Edateku Island =

Island within the Amami Islands of Japan

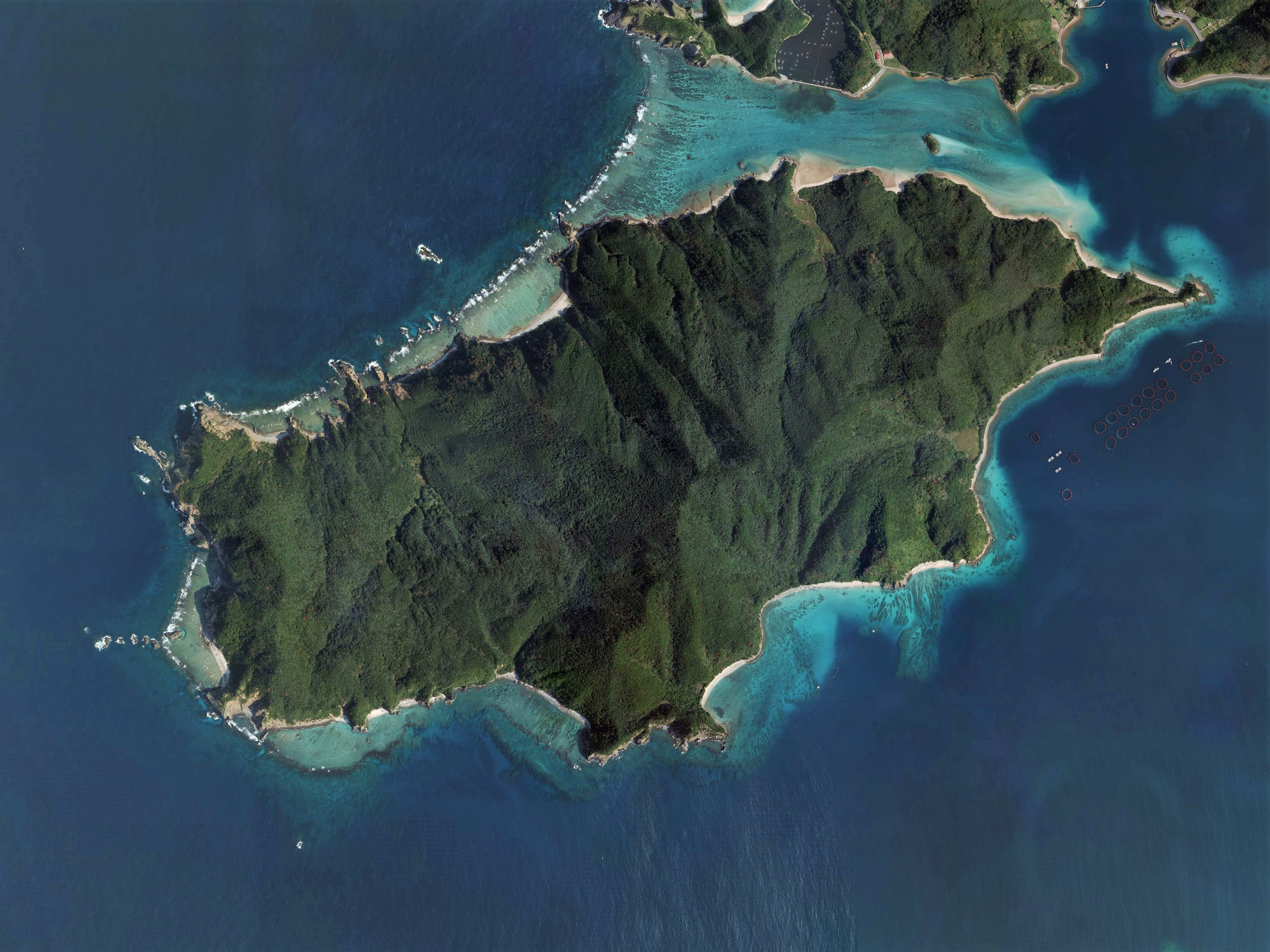
Aerial photograph of Edateku Island (Uken Village, Kagoshima Prefecture), 2008

Edateku Island (Japanese: 枝手久島) is one of the islands of Amami Islands of Satsunan Islands, Japan. It administratively belongs to Uken Village, Ōshima District, Kagoshima Prefecture. It is a desert island far off the Amami Oshima coast. It is said to be an origin of Achalinus werneri, a kind of colubrid snake species.

The island was originally planned to be an oil reserve site in 1970s, but this plan was finally called off as it was strongly opposed by nearby villagers.

== See also ==
- Desert island
- List of islands
