= Ovophis zhaoermii =

Scientific classification
- Kingdom: Animalia
- Phylum: Chordata
- Class: Reptilia
- Order: Squamata
- Suborder: Serpentes
- Family: Viperidae
- Genus: Ovophis
- Species: O. zhaoermii

Binomial name
- Ovophis zhaoermii Liu et al., 2025

Species of snake endemic to China

Ovophis zhaoermii, or the Guanyinshan mountain pitviper, is a species of mountain pit viper endemic to Yunnan, China. As with all pitvipers, O. zhaoermii is venomous.

== Description ==
Ovophis zhaoermii is a brownish-black to redish-brown snake, with no patterns on its head but rectangular black blotches and white spots present along its body and tail respectively. It can be distinguished from similar species via its various scale morphologies.

== Diet ==
The diet of the Guanyinshan mountain pitviper is unknown, but a species of Ovophis, possibly O. zhaoermii, was sighted with an adult male Ailao Mustache Toad in its jaws.

== Conservation ==
Currently, as the Guanyinshan mountain pitviper has only been sighted inside the legally protected Yuanyang Guanyinshan Provincial Nature Reserve, the snake is not considered to be threatened by humans.
