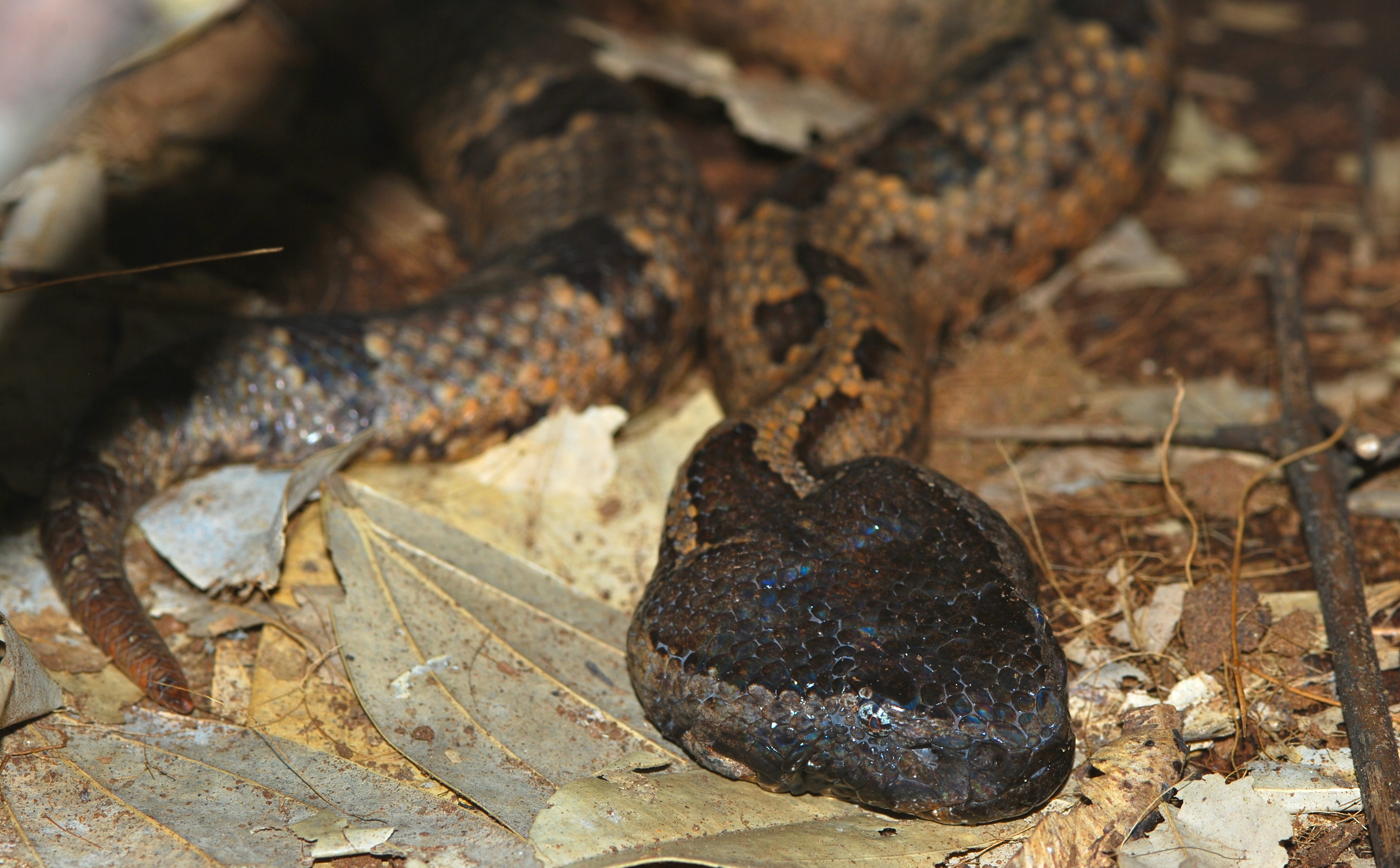

Scientific classification
- Kingdom: Animalia
- Phylum: Chordata
- Class: Reptilia
- Order: Squamata
- Suborder: Serpentes
- Family: Viperidae
- Genus: Ovophis
- Species: O. convictus

Binomial name
- Ovophis convictus (Stoliczka, 1870)

Synonyms
- Trimeresurus convictus Stoliczka, 1870

= Ovophis convictus =

Species of snake

Ovophis convictus, the Indo-Malayan mountain pit viper, is a species of venomous snake in the genus Ovophis found in Thailand, Malaysia, Indonesia, and Vietnam.

== Etymology ==
The specific name, convictus, is derived from Latin, meaning "convicted" or "bound together", possibly referring to the distinct patterning on the snake's body.

== Description ==
The average length of mature individuals is about 50-100 cm (approximately 20-39 inches). The body pattern consists of a brown, yellowish, or gray-brown background, overlaid with one or two dorsal series of large, squarish, dark-brown blotches. The top of the head is blackish-brown, with a brown stripe behind the eye, and the chin and throat are light mottled with brown.

== Geographical range ==
The Indo-Malayan mountain pit viper (Ovophis convictus) is found in Thailand, Malaysia, Indonesia, and Vietnam. This species inhabits a variety of environments, including mountainous regions, forests, and areas with dense vegetation
