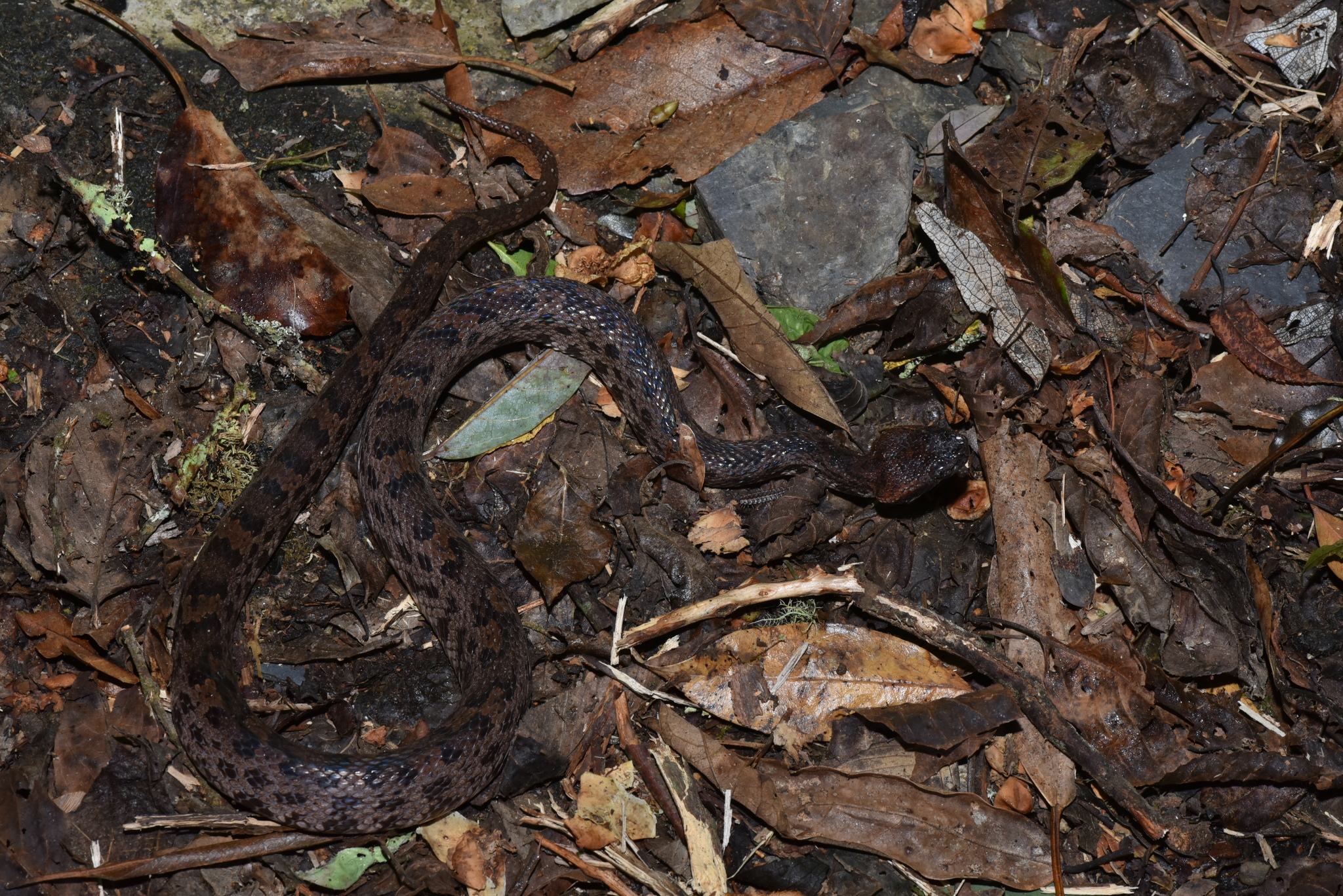
- Ovophis makazayazaya on the forest floor

Conservation status
- Least Concern (IUCN 3.1)

Scientific classification
- Kingdom: Animalia
- Phylum: Chordata
- Class: Reptilia
- Order: Squamata
- Suborder: Serpentes
- Family: Viperidae
- Genus: Ovophis
- Species: O. makazayazaya

Binomial name
- Ovophis makazayazaya (Takahashi, 1922)

Synonyms
- List: Ovophis monticola subsp. makazayazaya (Takahashi, 1922); Trimeresurus makazayazaya Takahashi, 1922; Trimeresurus monticola subsp. formosensis Mell, 1929; Trimeresurus monticola subsp. makazayazaya TU, 2000; Trimeresurus monticora Takahashi, 1930; Trimeresurus monticora subsp. makazayazaya Takahashi, 1930; Trimeresurus orientalis Schmidt, 1925

= Ovophis makazayazaya =

Taiwan mountain pit viper

Asian snake species

The Taiwan mountain pit viper (Ovophis makazayazaya; Chinese: 台湾烙铁头蛇), also known as the Eastern mountain pit viper or Oriental mountain pit viper, is a venomous snake native to southeast China, northern Vietnam, Laos, and Taiwan. It was previously considered a subspecies of Ovophis monticola, but was suggested as a full species in 2011.

== Description ==
Ovophis makazayazaya ranges in total length from 49 to 110 cm (19.3 to 43.3 in). Like many other snake species, females are larger than males. Its ventral scales range in count from 131 to 155. The species is diagnosed based on the larger fourth supralabial scale, in comparison to the third, and having paired caudal scales.
