= Eniyabanare Island =

Island within the Amami Islands of Japan

Eniyabanare Island (Japanese: 江仁屋離島 / えにやばなれじま; Okinawan: Eniyabanare-shima) is an island in Ryukyu Islands, located in the Amami Islands in Kagoshima Prefecture, Japan. Gangrenwu Islands is an uninhabited island in the Amami Islands. It belongs to Setouchi, Kagoshima. It is located on the southwest side of Amami Oshima, with an area of 0.31 square kilometers. The entire island belongs to the Amami Guntō National Park.
