= Ōshima Strait =

Body of water in Japan

Coordinates: 28°08′N 129°18′E

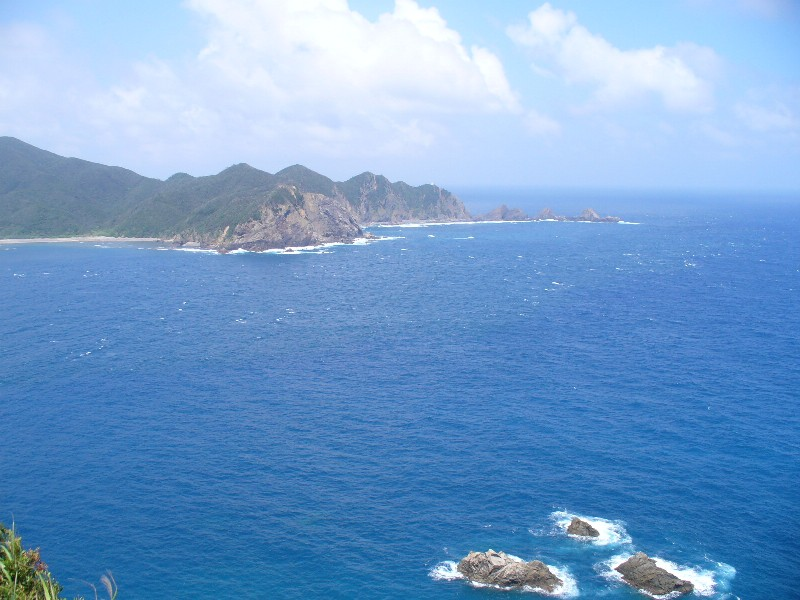
East side of the strait

The Ōshima Strait (大島海峡, Ōshima kaikyō) is a strait between the islands of Amami Ōshima and Kakeromajima in Japan. It is part of the Amami Guntō National Park. From the western most side to the eastern most side of the strait, the strait measures 17.5 miles (28.2 km) long.

== Ferry lines ==
There are 5 ferry lines that go through the strait. Each of them depart from the Setonami port in Amami Oshima island. These ferry lines operate often as transportation between these ports are very popular.

Ferry lines that go through Oshima Strait
Starting point	Ending point
Anami Oshima island (Setonami port)	Kakeromajima island (Seso port)
Anami Oshima island (Setonami port)	Kakeromajima island (Setouchi Town Ferry)
Anami Oshima island (Setonami port)	Ukejima island (Okeamuro port)
Anami Oshima island (Setonami port)	Tokunoshima island(Hetono port)
Anami Oshima island (Setonami port)	Anami Oshima island (Naze port)
