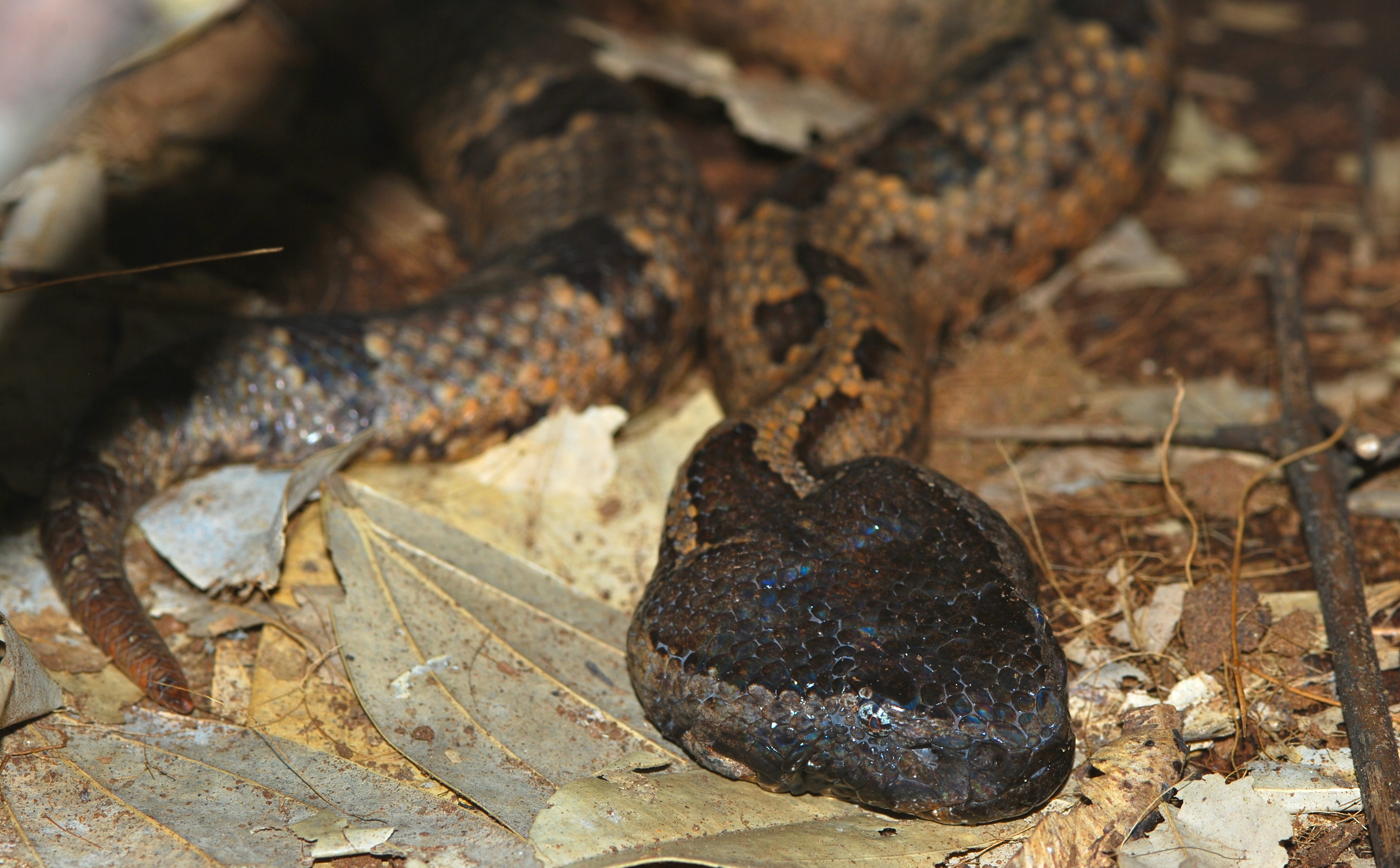

Conservation status
- Least Concern (IUCN 3.1)

Scientific classification
- Kingdom: Animalia
- Phylum: Chordata
- Class: Reptilia
- Order: Squamata
- Suborder: Serpentes
- Family: Viperidae
- Genus: Ovophis
- Species: O. monticola

Binomial name
- Ovophis monticola (Günther, 1864)
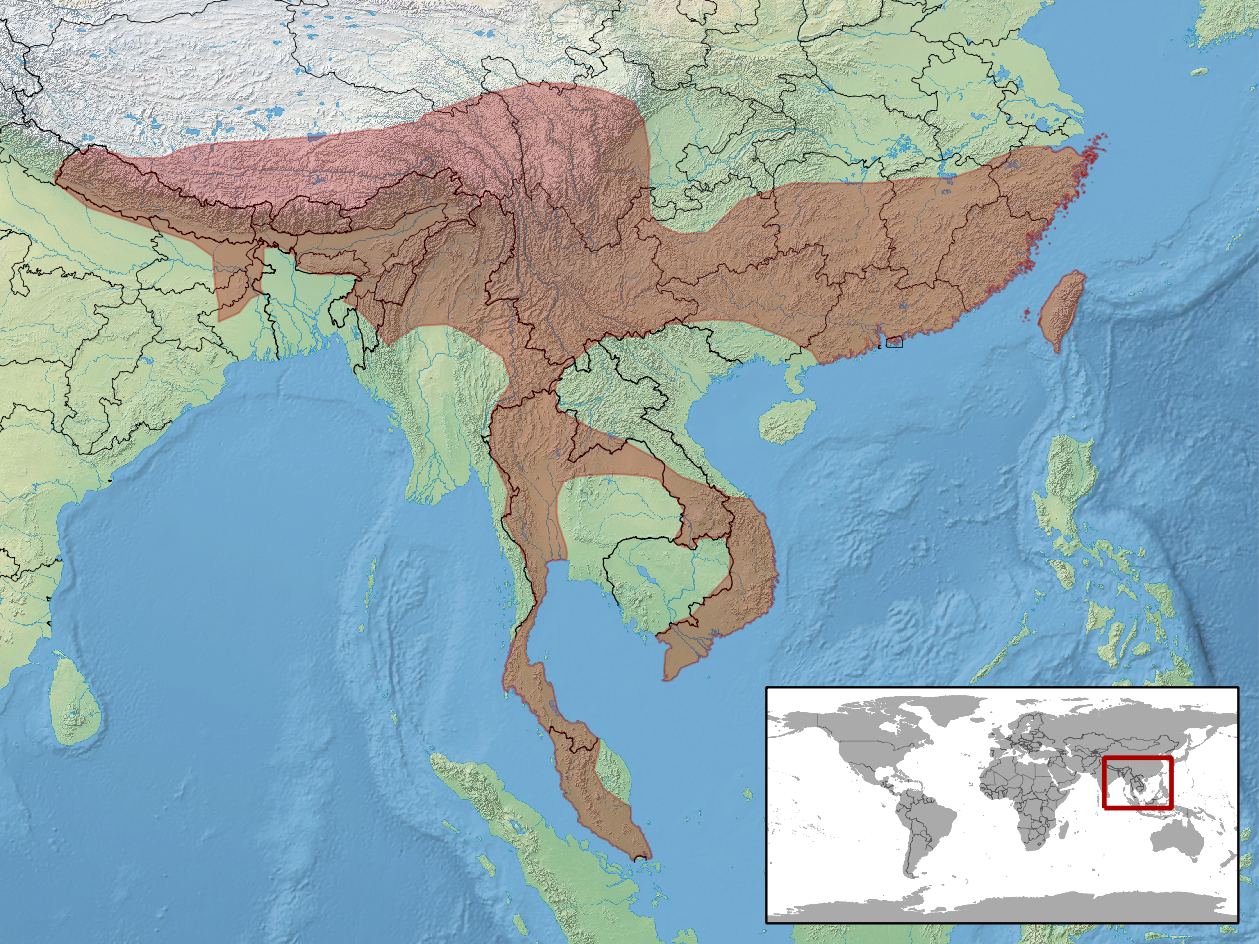

Synonyms
- Parias maculata - Gray, 1853; Trimeresurus monticola - Günther, 1864; Crotalus Trimeres[urus]. monticola - Higgins, 1873; Trimeresurus monticola - Boulenger, 1890; Lachesis monticola - Boulenger, 1896; Trimeresurus monticola monticola - Mell, 1931; Agkistrodon monticola - Pope, 1932; Trimeresurus tonkinensis - Bourret, 1934 (possible nomen nudum); Trimeresurus tonkinensis - Bourret, 1934; T[rimeresurus]. m[onticola]. tonkinensis - Deuve, 1970; Trimeresurus monticola - Saint-Girons, 1972; Ovophis monticola - Burger In Hoge & Romano-Hoge, 1981; Ovophis monticola monticola - Hoge & Romano-Hoge, 1981; Ovophis tonkinensis - Hoge & Romano-Hoge, 1981; Ovophis tonkinensis - Golay et al., 1993; Ovophis monticola monticola - Orlov & Helfenberger, 1997

= Ovophis monticola =

Species of snake

Ovophis monticola, commonly known as the Chinese mountain pit viper, is a pit viper species found in Asia. Currently, two subspecies are recognized, including the nominate subspecies described here. Recent taxonomic work suggests that most of these should be considered as separate species. IUCN has already evaluated O. m. makazayazaya as Ovophis makazayazaya.

== Description ==
Total length of males 49 cm (19 1/4 inches), of females 110 cm (43 1/4 inches); tail length of males 8 cm (3 1/8 inches), of females 15 cm (5 7/8 inches).

The head has a short snout, a little more than twice the length of the diameter of the eye. The crown is covered by small scales rather than large shields, while the scales are usually smooth, feebly imbricate. The first upper labial is not fused to the nasal and is completely separated by a suture. The supraoculars are large, 5-9 scales in a line between them. The internasals are usually not in contact with one another, separated by 2 small suprapostrostral scales. There are 7-10 upper labials, the second of which is usually fused to the scale bordering the facial sensory pit anteriorly. The fourth and fifth upper labials are beneath the eye, but separated from orbit by a series of 2-4 small scales.

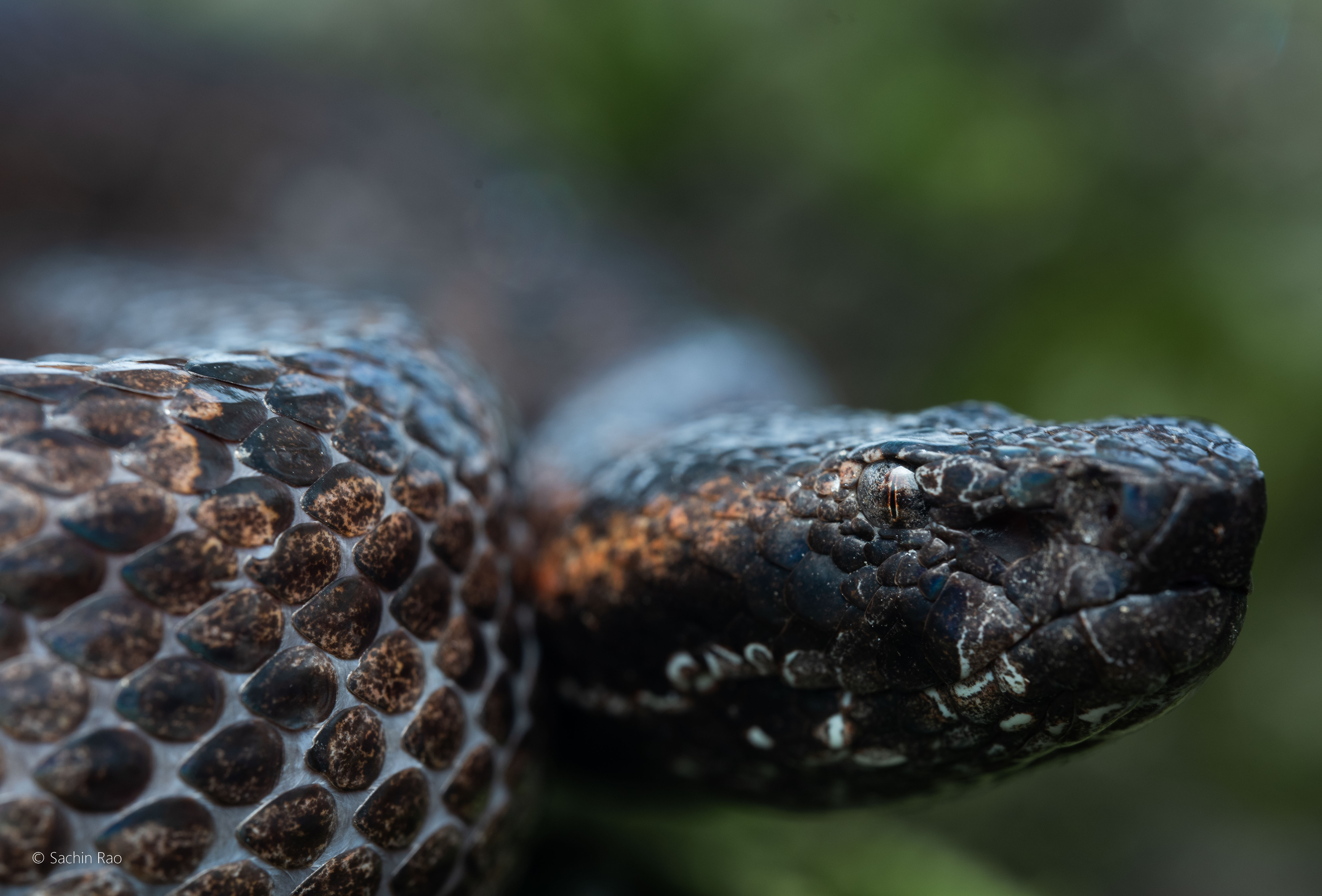
Mountain Pit Viper (Ovophis monticola) Close up

The body is stout. The dorsal scales are smooth or weakly keeled, in 23-25, occasionally in 19 or 21 longitudinal rows at midbody. Ventral scales and subcaudals (Myanmar, northeastern India and adjacent areas of China and Thailand) 137-176 and 36-62 respectively, subcaudals mixed paired and single, occasionally all unpaired (ventrals and subcaudals for southern China, Vietnam, Laos: 127-144 and 36-54, and Malaysian Peninsula: 133-137 and 22-28 respectively [fide Smith 1943:509]).

== Common names ==
Mountain pitviper, mountain viper, Chinese pit viper, spotted pit viper, Arisan habu, Chinese mountain pit viper. Bengali name: পাহাড়ী বোড়া.

== Geographic range ==
Found in Asia in Nepal, India (Assam, Sikkim, Mizoram, Nagaland), Bangladesh (already stated on the subspecies table), Myanmar, China (Zhejiang, Fujian, Sichuan, Yunnan, Tibet), Cambodia, Thailand, Laos, Vietnam, West Malaysia and Indonesia (Sumatra). The type locality is described as "Sikkim" (India).

== Subspecies ==
Subspecies	Taxon author	Common name	Geographic range
O. m. monticola	(Günther, 1864)	Mountain pitviper	Bangladesh (Chittagong Hill Tracts), China (Sichuan, Tibet Autonomous Region, Yunnan, India (Arunachal Pradesh, Assam, Mizoram, Manipur, Meghalaya, Nagaland, Sikkim, Uttarakhand and West Bengal), Myanmar (Chin, Kachin and Shan) and Nepal.
O. m. makazayazaya	(Takahashi, 1922)	Taiwanese mountain pitviper	Taiwan (Majia, Pingtung, Chiayi Alishan), China (Southeast), Vietnam
O. m. zhaokentangi	Zhao, 1995	Gaoligong mountain pitviper	Gaoligong Shan, north of Pianma, Lushui County, Yunnan Province, China.

== Venom ==
Little is known about the venom of this species but it is presumed to contain hemorrhagins and procoagulants. There has been one recorded fatality from the bite of this species.
