= Kakeromajima =

Island within the Amami Islands of Japan

Native name: Xakeroma (加計呂麻島)
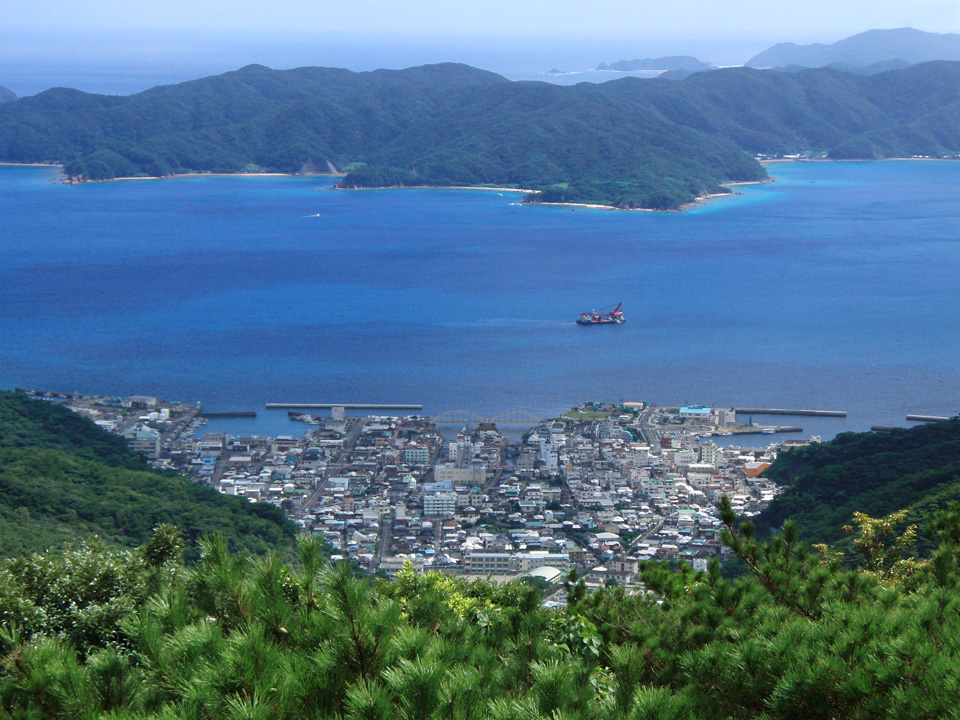
- View of Kakeromajima from Kochiyama on Amami-Oshima

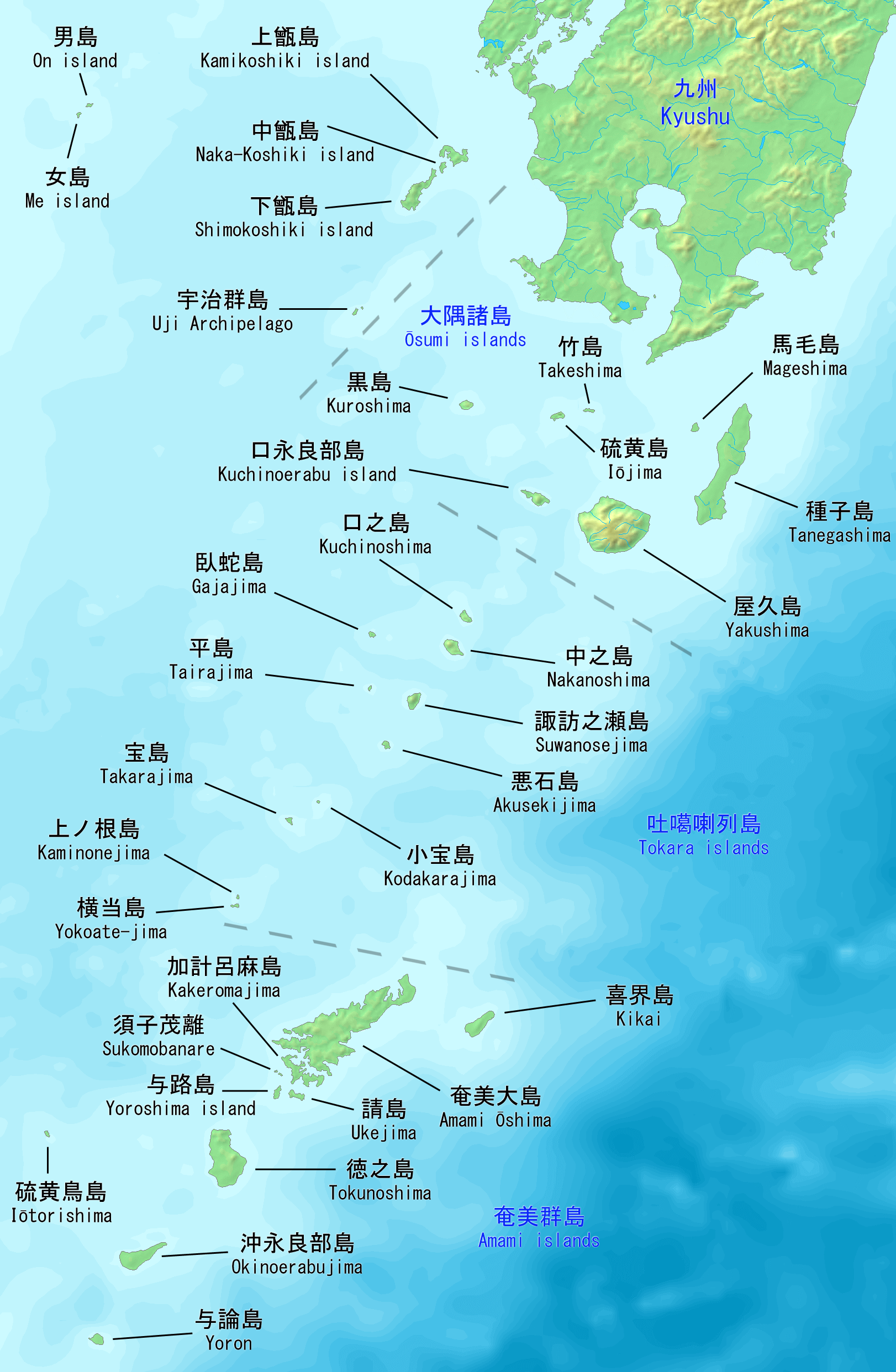

Geography
- Location: East China Sea
- Coordinates: 28°07′29″N 129°14′41″E
- Archipelago: Amami Islands
- Area: 77.39 km^{2} (29.88 sq mi)
- Coastline: 147.5 km (91.65 mi)
- Highest elevation: 326 m (1070 ft)

Administration
- Japan
- Prefectures: Kagoshima Prefecture
- District: Ōshima District
- Town: Setouchi

Demographics
- Population: 1,600 (2013)
- Pop. density: 20.67/km^{2} (53.54/sq mi)
- Ethnic groups: Ryukyuan, Japanese

Kakeromajima (Japanese: 加計呂麻島; also Kakeroma-tō; Amami: Xakeroma) is one of the Satsunan Islands, classed with the Amami archipelago between Kyūshū and Okinawa.

The island, 77.39 km^{2} (29.88 sq mi) in area, has a population of approximately 1,600 persons. Administratively it is part of the town of Setouchi in Kagoshima Prefecture. Much of the island is within the borders of the Amami Guntō Quasi-National Park.

== Geography ==
Kakeromajima is a rugged island southeast of Amami Ōshima, from which it is separated by the narrow Ōshima Strait. The island has an area of 77.30 km^{2} (29.85 sq mi), but a coastline approximately 147.5 km (91.7 mi). The highest point is 314 metres (1,030 ft) above sea level. The coast of the island is surrounded by a coral reef.

The climate of Kakeromajima is classified as a humid subtropical climate (Köppen climate classification Cfa) with very warm summers and mild winters. The rainy season lasts from May through September. The island is subject to frequent typhoons.

== History ==
It is uncertain when Kakeromajima was first settled. The island came under the control of the Satsuma Domain in 1609 and its incorporation into the official holdings of that domain was recognized by the Tokugawa shogunate in 1624. After the Meiji Restoration it was incorporated into Ōsumi Province and later became part of Kagoshima Prefecture. During World War II, the island was fortified and garrisoned by the Japanese military, and served as an occasional anchorage for ships of the Imperial Japanese Navy and in the final stages of the war, as a base for Shinyo-class suicide motorboats. Anti-aircraft batteries on Kakeromajima shot down 18 Allied aircraft attempting to bomb neighboring Amami-Oshima.

Following World War II, although with the other Amami Islands, Kakeromajima was occupied by the United States until 1953, at which time it reverted to the control of Japan.

== Transportation ==
Kakeromajima is connected to Amami-Oshima by frequent ferry services. There are 30 small hamlets on the island, but no main settlement.

== In popular culture ==
- Tora-san to the Rescue – the final episode in the long-running Otoko wa Tsurai yo movie series starring Kiyoshi Atsumi was partly set on Kakeromajima.
- The Sting of Death (Shi no toge), a 1989 film, was partly shot on location in Kakeromajima.
