= Amami Islands =

Archipelago within the Ryukyu Islands

Native name: Amami-guntō (奄美群島)
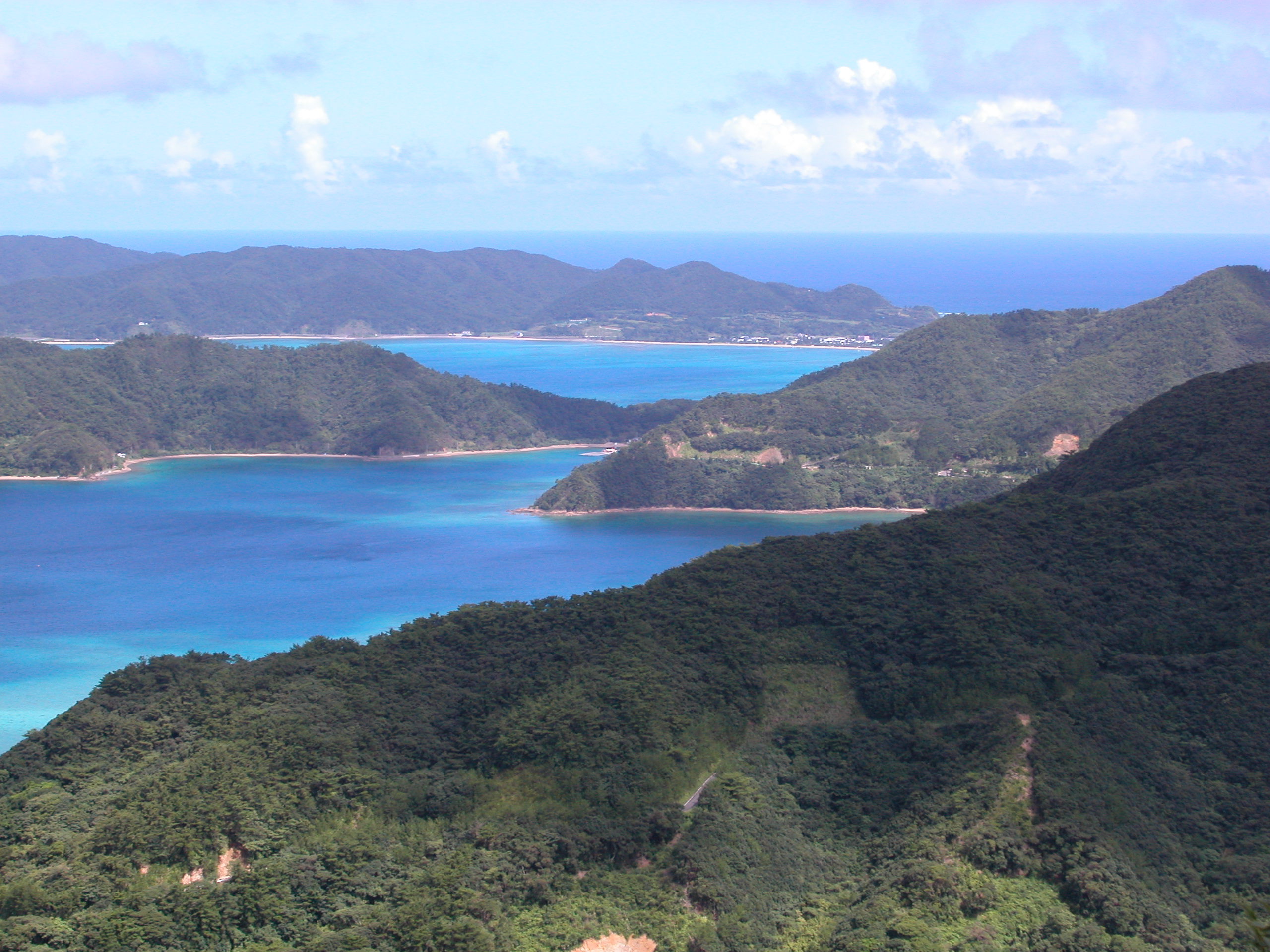
- Coast of Amami Oshima
- Interactive map of Amami Islands

Geography
- Coordinates: 28°16′N 129°21′E
- Adjacent to: Pacific Ocean
- Total islands: 8 (inhabited)
- Area: 1,240.28 km^{2} (478.87 sq mi)
- Highest elevation: 694 m (2277 ft)
- Highest point: Yuwandake

Administration
- Japan
- Prefectures: Kagoshima
- Municipal divisions: Amami; Ōshima District •Amagi •China •Isen •Kikai •Setouchi •Tatsugō •Tokunoshima •Uken •Wadomari •Yoron •Yamato

Demographics
- Population: 104,281 (2020)
- Ethnic groups: Ryukyuan, Japanese

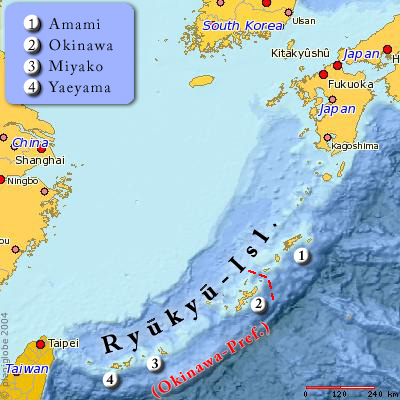
Location of Amami Islands

The Amami Islands (奄美群島, Amami Guntō; Japanese pronunciation: [ä́.mä̀.mʲì, ä̀.mä́.mʲí ɡɯ̈́ǹ.tò̞ò̞]) (Note: The name Amami Guntō was standardized on February 15, 2010."『奄美群島』を決定地名に採用". Geospatial Information Agency of Japan. Prior to that, another name, Amami Shotō (奄美諸島; Japanese pronunciation: [ä̀.mä́.mʲí ɕó̞.tò̞ò̞]), was also used.) are a Japanese archipelago in the Satsunan Islands, which is part of the Ryukyu Islands, and is southwest of Kyushu. Administratively, the group belongs to Kagoshima Prefecture, Japan. The Geospatial Information Authority of Japan and the Japan Coast Guard agreed on February 15, 2010, to use the name of Amami-guntō (奄美群島) for the Amami Islands. Prior to that, Amami-shotō (奄美諸島) was also used. The name of Amami is probably cognate with Amamikyu (阿摩美久), the goddess of creation in the Ryukyuan creation myth.

== Geography ==
The Amami Islands are limestone islands of coralline origin and have a total area of approximately 1,240.28 square kilometres (478.87 sq mi), of which 308.3 square kilometres (119.0 sq mi) constitute the city (-shi) of Amami, and 931.9 square kilometres (359.8 sq mi) constitute the district (-gun) of Oshima. The highest elevation is Yuwandake with a height of 694 metres (2,277 ft) on Amami Ōshima. The islands have a humid subtropical climate (Köppen climate classification Cfa) with very warm summers and mild winters. Precipitation is high throughout the year, but is highest in the months of May, June and September. The area is subject to frequent typhoons.

== Population ==
The population of the Amami Islands on 1 October 2020 was 104,281, of which 41,390 were in the city of Amami-shi and 62,891 were in the district of Oshima-gun.

== History ==
Amami was once home to local pirate groups. During the Heian period, a pirate force referred to as the Nanbanzoku (南蛮族、奄美嶋人) raided various parts of Kyushu, including Satsuma Province, corresponding to present-day Kagoshima Prefecture, and Chikuzen Province, corresponding to present-day Fukuoka Prefecture. These raids reportedly involved the abduction of several hundred civilians and the looting of property.

=== Amami period ===
Islanders started to produce earthenware from 6,000 years ago, affected by the Jōmon culture in Kyushu. Initially, the styles were similar to those of the main islands of Japan, but later, a style original to Amami, known as "Usuki Lower Style", was developed.

Among Japanese literature, mention of the islands first appeared in the late 7th century. The Nihon Shoki contains an entry dated 657 referring to Amami-shima (海見嶋; "Amami Island"), and to the Amami-bito (阿麻弥人; "Amami people") in 682. The Shoku Nihongi refers to Amami (菴美) in 699 and Amami (奄美) in 714. All of these are believed to be identical to the current Amami. The tenth kentō-shi mission (Japanese Imperial embassies to China) traveled to Tang dynasty China via Amami Ōshima.

Among locals, this prehistoric period is called the Amami period (奄美世, Aman'yu).

=== Aji period ===
Agriculture came to the islands around the 12th century, and the people shifted to farming from hunting. As on Okinawa Island, this resulted in the development of a nobility class called the aji, who resided in castles called gusuku. Famous gusuku included Beru Castle in Kasari, Amami, and Yononushi Castle in Wadomari. Stronger aji battled each other to expand their territories. Local folklore states that some Taira clan members, having lost the Battle of Dan-no-ura in 1185, fled to Amami Ōshima. The historical accuracy of this claim is unknown.

This gusuku period is sometimes called the Aji period (按司世, Ajin'yu).

=== Naha period ===
Eventually the Amami aji were forced to pay tribute to stronger nations to retain autonomy. Ryukyuan records state that Amami aji paid tribute to Eiso, the king of Chūzan in Sanzan period Okinawa. Okinoerabu and Yoron fell under Hokuzan's control. However, since Okinawa itself was still rife with civil wars, it could not control the Northern Amami Islands. Aji from Tokuno and further north just paid tribute to Okinawan kingdoms, and continued to remain independent. After 1429, Shō Hashi unified Okinawa Island, founding the Ryukyu Kingdom. During the 1430s and 1440s, Ryukyu expanded into the Amami Islands. By 1450, Ryukyuan forces had reached deep into the Tokara Islands and conquered all but Kikai Island, which was invaded in 1466. Satsuma Domain of Japan attempted to invade Amami Ōshima in 1493, but Ryukyu defeated them. During the 16th century, there were three rebellions on Amami Ōshima that Ryukyu put down: one in 1536, one in 1537, and one in 1571.

This period is called Naha period (那覇世, Nahan'yu), after the major port of Ryukyu.

=== Yamato period ===
United States CIA map of the islands from October 1944, depicting intelligence for a possible invasion

Ryukyu's direct control lasted just over 170 years. Trade with Ming dynasty China, which flourished in the Azuchi-Momoyama period, led Shimazu Tadatsune, the ruler of Satsuma Domain in southern Kyushu, to invade the Ryukyu Kingdom in order to gain control of the shipping routes between Japan and China. In April 1609, Shimazu launched an invasion of the Ryukyu Kingdom. They landed on Amami Ōshima, then Tokuno, Okinoerabu, and Okinawa itself. Satsuma met fierce resistance, but eventually defeated Ryukyu, by capturing the capital of Shuri.

Ryukyu ceded the Amami Islands to Satsuma Domain in 1611. Satsuma started to directly rule the islands from 1613, sending a daikan commissioner. However, it was still nominally treated as Ryukyuan territory, and bureaucrats from the kingdom were dispatched as well. Satsuma control over the islands was formally recognized by the Tokugawa shogunate in 1624.

At first, Satsuma's administration was a mild one, but as the financial deterioration of the domain became worse, the administration changed to one of exploitation. Satsuma imposed high taxes payable in sugar. This resulted in sugarcane monoculture, which often resulted in severe famines.

During these times, the Amami people found their joys in local liquors made from sugarcanes, awamori bought from Ryukyu, and folk songs sung with sanshin. Their folk songs evolved into a style different from that of Ryukyu, and still remain as a part of their culture today. Under Satsuma's rule, names of Amami people underwent a great change, and they are today known for many unique one-character surnames.

In 1871, after the Meiji Restoration, the Amami Islands were incorporated into Ōsumi Province, and then into Kagoshima Prefecture. During World War II, more than 20,000 Japanese soldiers were garrisoned in the Amami Islands, although the islands were never invaded, and experienced only small scale airstrikes.

This period, until 1945, is called the Yamato period (大和世, Yamatun'yu).

=== American period ===
After the surrender of Japan, the Amami Islands fell under direct American military control, with American documents referring to the Amami Islands as the "Northern Ryukyu Islands". The Japanese government believed this indicated an American intention to permanently separate the islands from Japan, and in response, stressed to the American occupation authorities that the islands were an integral part of Kagoshima Prefecture.

In February 1946, the Amami Islands were officially separated from Japan. In October, the Provisional Government of the Northern Ryukyu Islands was founded, formed by local leaders. It changed its name to the Amami Gunto Government in 1950. However, under a democratic election, the local electorate chose a governor who pledged reversion to Japan (this also happened in other native governments of Ryukyu, namely those of Okinawa, Miyakojima, and Yaeyama). The United States Civil Administration of the Ryukyu Islands (USCAR) was alarmed by this development, and reduced the power of native governments to that of a figurehead status. In 1952, USCAR founded another governmental body called the Government of the Ryukyu Islands, in which "local leaders" were appointed by the American government.

Amami residents were dissatisfied with these controls by the U.S. Moreover, the Amami economy suffered from separation from the Japanese market. Public funds of the U.S. administration were mostly used for heavily damaged Okinawa and the military bases there. The Amami Islands Homeland Restoration Movement, which had started immediately after the separation, became stronger. The Amami Communist Party, formed in 1947, also favored reunification. Among locals over 14 years old, 99.8% of them signed in a bid toward reversion. Some municipalities and communities went on a hunger strike after the example of Mahatma Gandhi.

The Treaty of San Francisco in 1952 put the Amami islands under trusteeship as part of the Ryukyu Islands. The U.S. returned the Tokara Islands to Japan in February 1952, and the Amami Islands on December 25, 1953. The U.S. government called it "a Christmas present to Japan".

This period is called the American period (アメリカ世, Amerika-yo).

=== After reversion to Japan ===
Although the Amami Islands were returned to Japan in 1953, Okinawa remained under American control until 1972. Because of this, Amami people who worked in Okinawa suddenly became "foreigners", making their situations difficult.

The Japanese government promulgated the Amami Islands Promotion and Development Special Measures Law. However, the economic gap between the islands and the mainland still exists to this day. The law did help residents by improving the island's infrastructure. However, its bureaucratic system has been criticized as causing unnecessary destruction of nature.

In 2001, there was a small naval exchange between North Korea and Japan in the Battle of Amami-Ōshima, which resulted in a Japanese victory.

== Islands ==
Photo	Name	Kanji	Area [km^{2}]	Population	highest point [m]	Peak	Coordinates
	Amami Ōshima	奄美大島	712.35	73,000	694	Yuwandake	28°19′35″N 129°22′29″E
	Kikaijima	喜界島	56.93	7,657	214.0		29°19′01″N 129°56′22″E
	Kakeromajima	加計呂麻島	77.39	1600	314		28°07′29″N 129°14′41″E
	Yoroshima	与路島	9.35	140	297	Okachiyama	28°02′39″N 129°09′50″E
	Ukejima	請島	13.35	200	400	Ōyama	28°01′38″N 129°14′22″E
	Tokunoshima	徳之島	247.77	27,000	645	Inokawadake	27°49′12″N 128°55′56″E
	Okinoerabujima	沖永良部島	93.63	15,000	246.0	Ōyama	27°22′08″N 128°34′00″E
	Yoronjima	与論島	20.8	6,000	98		27°02′40″N 128°25′02″E
	Edateku Island	枝手久島					
	Sukomobanare	須子茂離島					
	Eniyabanare Island	Japanese: 江仁屋離島, romanized: eniyabanarejima					
	Yubanare Island	Japanese: 夕離島, romanized: Yubanare					
	Kiyama Island	Japanese: 木山島, romanized: Kiyama jima					

== Culture ==
As a part of the Ryukyuan cultural sphere, Amami culture is closer to that of the other Ryukyu Islands than to that of mainland Japan. However, the islands' history is different from Okinawa as well. Okinawa, including the Sakishima Islands, had strong cultural influences from China, whereas Amami was affected more by Japan. Because of this, the Amami people themselves regard their culture as distinct from that of Okinawa. The Amami people treat the area between Kikai, Amami Ōshima, and Tokuno as part of their own cultural sphere.

On the other hand, islanders from Yoron, just 22 km away from Okinawa, have much closer cultural ties to Okinawa.

=== Language ===
Idiolects spoken in a large part of the Amami Islands are collectively known as the Amami language. It is divided into several dialects: the Kikai dialect, North Amami dialect, South Amami dialect, and Tokunoshima dialect. Dialects spoken in the southern islands of Okinoerabu and Yoron are part of the Kunigami language centered on Northern Okinawa Island.

These dialects and languages all belong to the Northern Ryukyuan group of the Ryukyuan languages. Although the Ryukyuan languages belong to the Japonic family along with Japanese, they are often not mutually intelligible between each other and Japanese.

Because of the education system put in place during the Meiji period, all Amami people today speak standard Japanese. However, the de facto common speech among Amami people under 60 is Amami Japanese, a dialect of the Japanese language that uses an Amami accent and some words and phrases from the Amami language, locally referred to as Ton-futsūgo (トン普通語; lit. "Potato standard"). The speech is different from Uchinaa-Yamatuguchi (Okinawan Japanese), the Okinawan equivalent used in Okinawa. Ton-futsūgo is affected not only by standard Japanese, but also by the Kagoshima dialect and the Kansai dialect.

=== Music ===
The local folk songs in Amami are called shima uta. Although shima means "island" in Japanese, it means "community" in Amami. Thus shima uta literally means "communities' songs". Singers of shima uta are called utasha (lit. "singer"). Some utasha also sing pop songs as well, examples include Chitose Hajime, Kousuke Atari, Rikki, and Anna Sato. Some believe that the word shima uta originally referred to Amami folk songs only, and is therefore now mistakenly used for Okinawan folk songs. The Japanese rock band The Boom's 1992 hit song called Shima Uta, which incorporated some Okinawan styles and thus causes confusion as to the precision of the term. Others argue the word was used for Okinawan folk songs as well even before 1992.

While Okinawan folk songs use the pentatonic scale of Ab, C, Db, Eb, G – that is, a hemitonic scale with intervals 2-0.5-1-2-0.5 (leading note) – Amami folk songs use the scale of C, D, E, G, A – an anhemitonic scale with intervals 1-1-1.5-1-1.5 (the same as the Greek pentatonic scale). Singers use a falsetto voice when singing.

=== Religion ===
Each community has multiple utaki shrines for the native religion, as well as Shinto shrines established by the Japanese government, whereas Buddhist temples are less common than in Japan. As in Okinawa, priestesses called noro exist, and the people worship according to the native religious norms.

There are three Ryukyuan tomb styles: the house style, the turtle style, and the cave style. Most tombs in Amami use the house style, unlike in Okinawa where the turtle style is more prevalent. However, there are tombs called "Shiroma Tofuru" tombs, which were built 400 years ago, that use the turtle style.

== Region ==
- The regional commercial center is the city of Amami on Amami Ōshima.
- There are no universities or colleges in the Amami Islands. From 2004, The Graduate School of Humanistic-Sociological Sciences of Kagoshima University started satellite schooling in the city of Amami.
- There are repeaters of television and AM radio. Among FM stations, only NHK-FM has a repeater, but there is a local community FM station as well.
- There are two local newspapers in the Amami Islands, namely the Nankainichinichi Shimbun and the Amami Shinbun.

== See also ==
- Amami rabbit, a rabbit endemic to Amami Ōshima and Tokunoshima
- Amami woodcock

== Bibliography ==
- National Geospatial Intelligence Agency (NGIA). Prostar Sailing Directions 2005 Japan Enroute. Prostar Publications (2005). ISBN 1-57785-651-1
- Eldridge, Mark. The Return of the Amami Islands: The Reversion Movement and U.S.-Japan Relations. Levington Books (2004) ISBN 0-7391-0710-0
- Hellyer. Robert. Defining Engagement: Japan and Global Contexts, 1640–1868. Harvard University Press (2009) ISBN 0-674-03577-1
- Turnbull, Stephen. The Most Daring Raid of the Samurai. Rosen Publishing Group (2011) ISBN 978-1-4488-1872-3
