= Sumiyo, Kagoshima =

Dissolved municipality in Kagoshima prefecture, Japan

Sumiyō (住用村, Sumiyō-son) was a village located on Amami Ōshima in Ōshima District, Kagoshima Prefecture, Japan.

As of 2003, the village had an estimated population of 1,943 and a density of 16.44 persons per km^{2}. The total area was 118.16 km^{2}.

On March 20, 2006, Sumiyō, along with the city of Naze, and the town of Kasari (also from Ōshima District), was merged to create the city of Amami.

== Education ==
Schools in the municipality included:

- Toujou Elementary and Junior High School (東城小中学校)
- Sumiyou Junior High School (住用中学校)
- Sumiyou Elementary School (住用小学校)

== Points of interest ==
- Amami Islands Botanical Garden
