= Praolia citrinipes =

Scientific classification
- Kingdom: Animalia
- Phylum: Arthropoda
- Clade: Pancrustacea
- Class: Insecta
- Order: Coleoptera
- Suborder: Polyphaga
- Infraorder: Cucujiformia
- Family: Cerambycidae
- Genus: Praolia
- Species: P. citrinipes

Binomial name
- Praolia citrinipes Bates, 1884

Species of beetle

Praolia citrinipes is a species of beetle in the family Cerambycidae. It was described by Henry Walter Bates in 1884. It is known from Japan, Taiwan, and Korea.

Praolia citrinipes measure 5–8 mm (0.20–0.31 in).

== Subspecies ==
Five subspecies are recognized:

- Praolia citrinipes atripennis (Pic, 1923) – Taiwan
- Praolia citrinipes citrinipes Bates, 1884 – Japan (from Tokara Islands (northern Ryukyu Archipelago) to all the main islands), Korea
- Praolia citrinipes ishigakiana (Ohbayashi N., 1970) – Japan (Ishigaki and Iriomote Islands, southern Ryukyu Archipelago)
- Praolia citrinipes takeuchii Ohmoto, 1990 – Japan (Amami Ōshima, central Ryukyu Archipelago)
- Praolia citrinipes umui Kusama & Takakuwa, 1984 – Japan (Okinawa Island, central Ryukyu Archipelago)
