= Tatsugō, Kagoshima =

Tatsugō 龍郷町
- Town
- Flag Seal

- Location of Tatsugō in Kagoshima Prefecture

- Coordinates: 28°24′55″N 129°35′23″E
- Country: Japan
- Region: Kyushu (Amami Islands)
- Prefecture: Kagoshima Prefecture
- District: Ōshima

Area
  - Total: 82.08 km^{2} (31.69 sq mi)

Population (June 1, 2013)
  - Total: 5,992
  - Density: 73/km^{2} (190/sq mi)
- Time zone: UTC+9 (Japan Standard Time)
- -Tree: Ryukyu Pine
- Flower: Prunus campanulata
- Phone number: 0997-62-3111
- Address: 110, Ura, Tatsugō-chō, Kagoshima-ken 894-0192
- Website: www.town.tatsugo.lg.jp

Tatsugō (龍郷町, Tatsugō-chō) is a town located on Amami Ōshima, in Ōshima District, Kagoshima Prefecture, Japan.

As of June 2013, the town had an estimated population of 5,992 and a population density of 73 persons per km^{2}. The total area was 82.06 km^{2}.

== Geography ==
Tatsugō occupies the northern portion of Amami Ōshima, facing the East China Sea to the east and the Pacific Ocean to the west. It is bordered by the city of Amami to both the south and the north. The climate is classified as humid subtropical (Köppen climate classification Cfa) with very warm summers and mild winters. Precipitation is high throughout the year, but is highest in the months of May, June and September. The area is subject to frequent typhoons.

=== Surrounding municipalities ===
- Amami

== History ==
Tatsugō Village was established on April 1, 1908. As with all of the Amami Islands, the village came under the administration of the United States from July 1, 1946 to December 25, 1953. It was elevated to town status on February 10, 1975.

== Economy ==
The town economy is primarily based on agriculture, with sugar cane and citrus horticulture as the main crops, and commercial fishing. The Amami Nature Observation Forest, in the Nakagumo mountains, is in the center of Tatsugō and is a popular ecotourist attractive. Tatsugō is also known for the production of Ōshima tsumugi, a traditional silk textile used for high-quality kimono. The town is home to Maeda Tsumugi Kōgei, one of the largest producers of Ōshima tsumugi in Japan.

== Tatsugō-gara ==
The Tatsugō-gara pattern is a traditional design used in Ōshima tsumugi weaving, named after Tatsugō village on Amami Ōshima. It is composed of three stylized motifs: the scales of the venomous habu snake, the zigzag leaves of the sotetsu (sago palm), and floral elements (sometimes colored in red or blue).

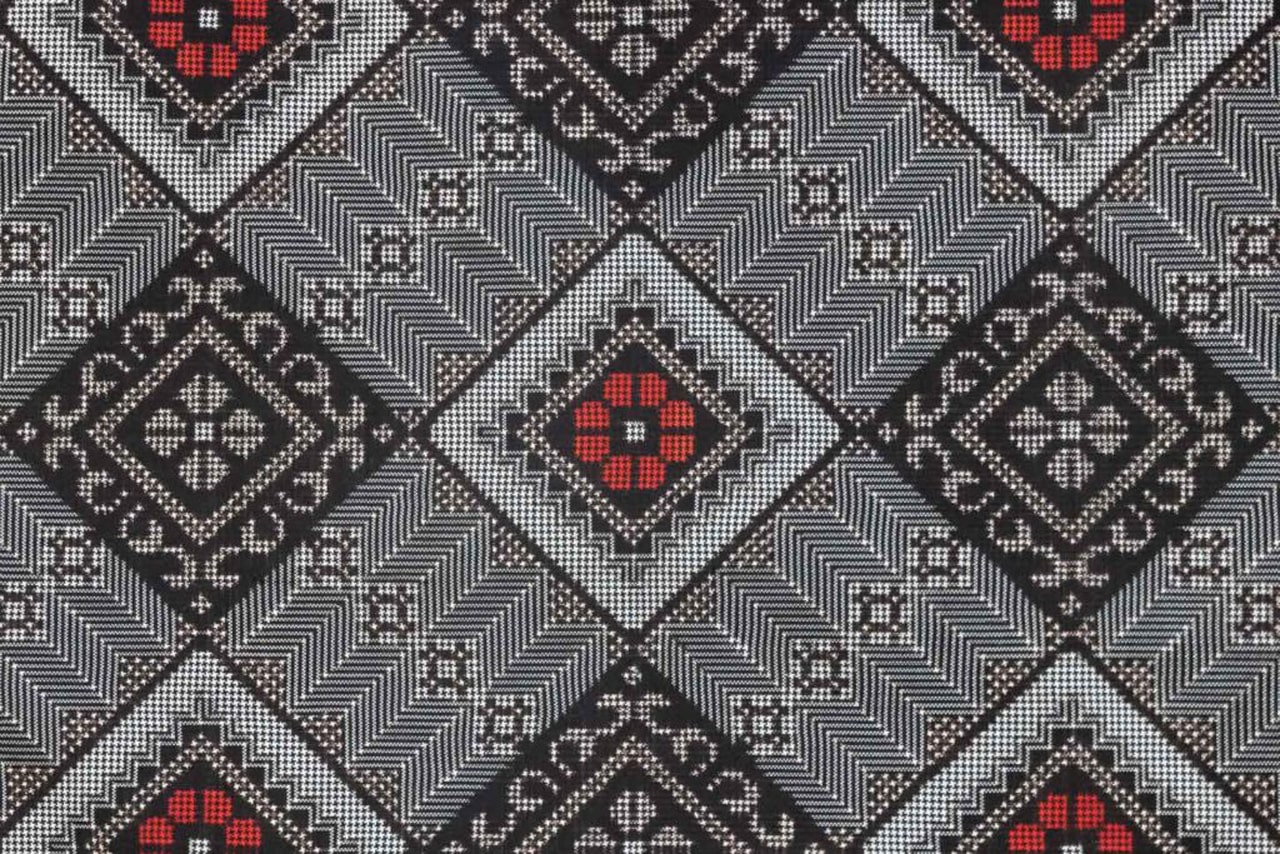

These motifs reflect the natural environment of the region and are abstracted into geometric forms using the precise ikat technique characteristic of Ōshima tsumugi.

== Transportation ==
=== Highway ===
- Japan National Route 58
