= Vellodius =

Scientific classification
- Domain: Eukaryota
- Kingdom: Animalia
- Phylum: Arthropoda
- Class: Malacostraca
- Order: Decapoda
- Suborder: Pleocyemata
- Infraorder: Brachyura
- Family: Xanthidae
- Genus: Vellodius; Ng & Yang, 1998
- Species: V. etisoides

Binomial name
- Vellodius etisoides (Takeda & Miyake, 1968)

Synonyms
- Pilodius etisoides Takeda & Miyake, 1968

Genus of crabs

Vellodius etisoides is a species of crab in the family Xanthidae. It was originally described as Pilodius etisoides, but was transferred to the monotypic genus Vellodius in 1998. It is found around Amami Ōshima in the Ryūkyū Islands, and the Paracel Islands in the South China Sea.
