= Sphegina amamiensis =

Scientific classification
- Kingdom: Animalia
- Phylum: Arthropoda
- Clade: Pancrustacea
- Class: Insecta
- Order: Diptera
- Family: Syrphidae
- Genus: Sphegina
- Species: S. amamiensis

Binomial name
- Sphegina amamiensis Shiraki, 1968

Species of fly

Sphegina (Asiosphegina) amamiensis is a species of hoverfly in the family Syrphidae found in Japan. It is easily identified by the wide bifid lobe on the male sternum IV which is located on the right side; in most other species it is located on the left.

== Etymology ==
The name comes from Amami Ōshima where S. amamiensis was first discovered.

== Description ==
S. (A.) amamiensis has a short frontal prominence. The face is black; mouth edge dark brown; pro- and mesotarsus with tarsomeres 4 and 5 black; metafemur black and yellow biannulate; tergum I with an oblique row of light yellow setae at lateral margin; tergum III with red-brown fascia on anterior ½. The basal flagellomere is oval, the arista short and pilose; scutellum with setae rather long and closely set.
