= Kasari, Kagoshima =

Japanese municipality

Kasari (笠利町, Kasari-chō) was a town located on Amami Ōshima in Ōshima District, Kagoshima Prefecture, Japan. As of 2003, the town had an estimated population of 6,856 and a density of 113.83 persons per km^{2}. The total area was 60.23 km^{2}. On March 20, 2006, Kasari, along with the city of Naze, and the village of Sumiyō (also from Ōshima District), was merged to create the city of Amami.
