= Praolia mizutanii =

Scientific classification
- Kingdom: Animalia
- Phylum: Arthropoda
- Clade: Pancrustacea
- Class: Insecta
- Order: Coleoptera
- Suborder: Polyphaga
- Infraorder: Cucujiformia
- Family: Cerambycidae
- Genus: Praolia
- Species: P. mizutanii

Binomial name
- Praolia mizutanii Niisato, 1989

Species of beetle

Praolia mizutanii is a species of beetle in the family Cerambycidae. It was described by Niisato Tatsuya in 1989. It is known from Amami Ōshima (Ryukyu Islands, Japan).

Praolia mizutanii measure 5.2–6.4 mm (0.20–0.25 in).
