= Amami, Kagoshima =

Amami 奄美市
- City
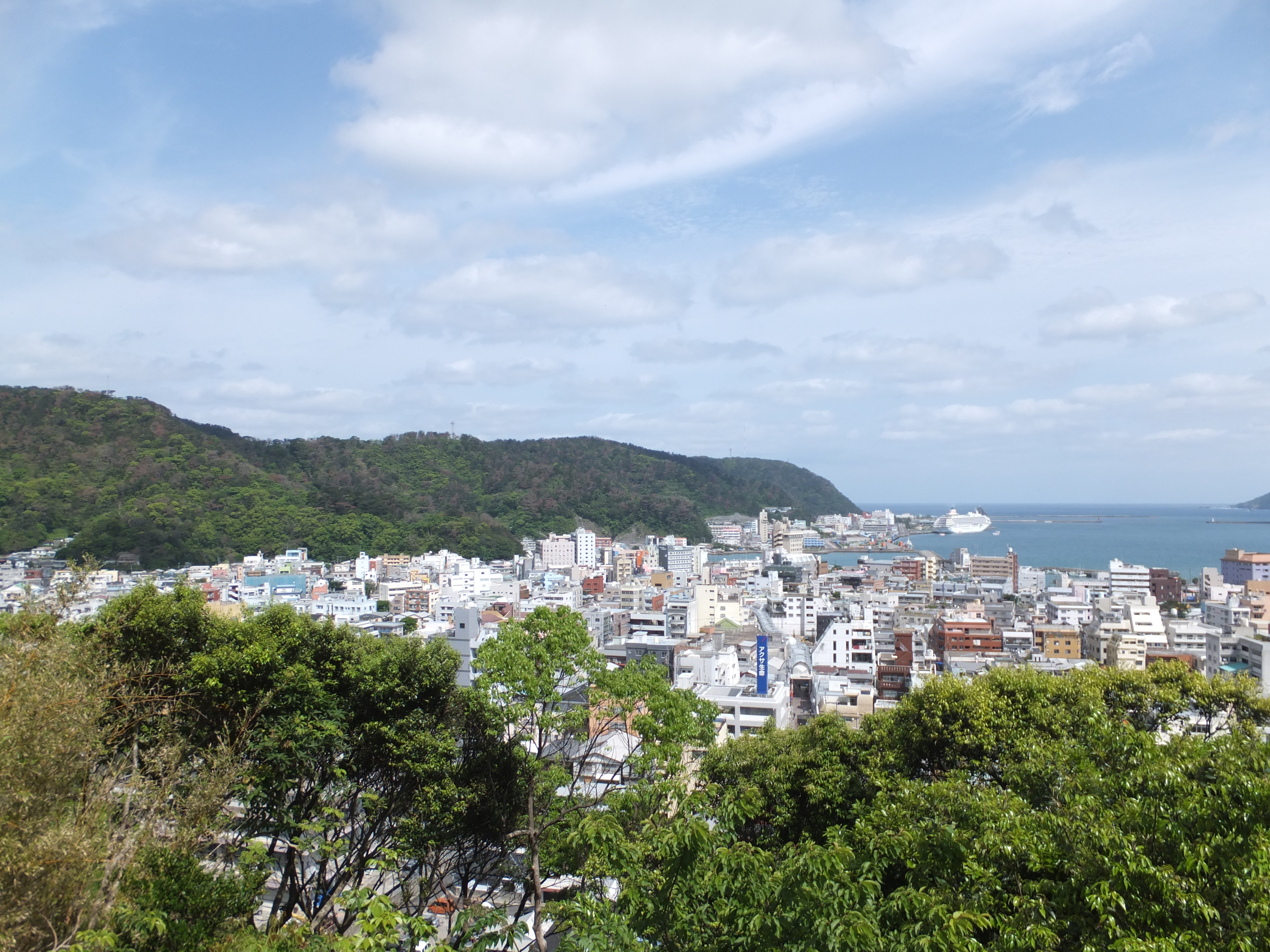
- Skyline of Amami City

- Flag Seal

- Location of Amami in Kagoshima Prefecture

- Amami (Asia)
- Coordinates: 28°22′42″N 129°29′40″E
- Country: Japan
- Region: Kyushu (Amami Islands)
- Prefecture: Kagoshima Prefecture
- First official recorded: 657 AD
- Naze City Settled: July 1, 1946
- Current city name changed for: March 20, 2006

Government
  - Mayor: Tsuyoshi Asayama

Area
  - Total: 308.15 km^{2} (118.98 sq mi)

Population (October 1, 2020)
  - Total: 41,390
  - Density: 134/km^{2} (350/sq mi)
- Time zone: UTC+9 (Japan Standard Time)
- -Tree: Ryūkyūmatsu and Banyan
- Flower: Sharinbai and Hibiscus
- -Other Plants: Hikagehego
- Phone number: 0997-52-1111
- Address: 25-8 Naze-saiwaichō, Amami-shi, Kagoshima-ken 894-0025
- Website: www.city.amami.lg.jp

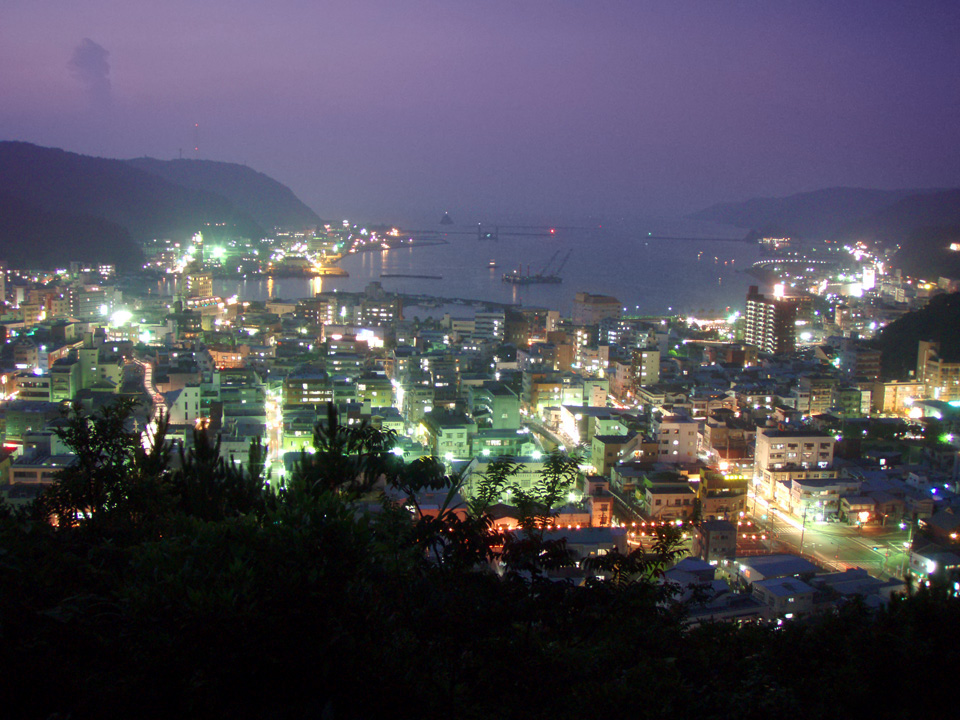
Night view of downtown Amami

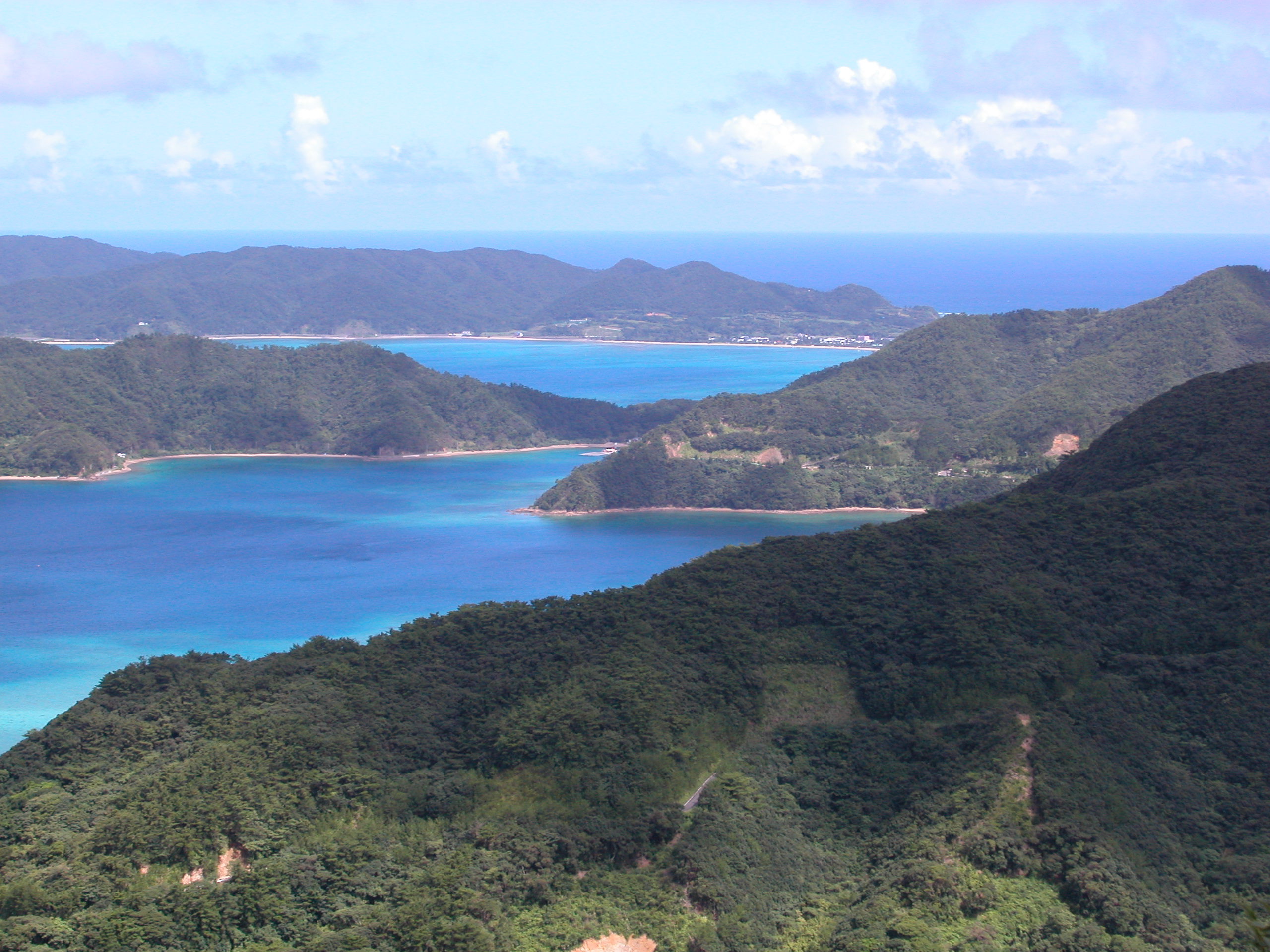
Beaches

Amami (奄美市, Amami-shi; Japanese pronunciation: [ä́.mä̀.mʲì, ä̀.mä́.mʲí.ɕì]) is a city located on the island of Amami Ōshima, in Kagoshima Prefecture, Japan. Amami is the most populated municipality on Amami Ōshima. The most urban part of the municipality as well as the island's main port is a small city also known as Naze. As of 1 October 2020, the city has an estimated population of 41,390 and a population density of 134 persons per km^{2}. The total area is 308.15 km^{2}.

== History ==
The village of Naze was established on April 1, 1908. It was elevated to town status on October 1, 1922. As with all of the Amami Islands, the village came under the administration of the United States from July 1, 1946, to December 25, 1953. It was elevated to city status on July 1, 1946.

The modern city of Amami was established on March 20, 2006, from the merger of the city of Naze, the town of Kasari, and the village of Sumiyō (both from Ōshima District).

== Geography ==
Amami is bordered by the East China Sea to the north and the Pacific Ocean to the south. The Kasari area of the city is an exclave, separated from the main part of Amami by the town of Tatsugō.

=== Climate ===
Amami has a humid subtropical climate (Köppen climate classification Cfa) with long, hot, humid summers and mild winters. Precipitation is abundant throughout the year, with particularly heavy rainfall in May, June, August and September. The area is subject to frequent typhoons.

Climate data for Naze, Amami (1991−2020 normals, extremes 1896−present)
| Month | Jan | Feb | Mar | Apr | May | Jun | Jul | Aug | Sep | Oct | Nov | Dec | Year |
|---|---|---|---|---|---|---|---|---|---|---|---|---|---|
| Record high °C (°F) | 28.1 (82.6) | 28.2 (82.8) | 30.4 (86.7) | 32.1 (89.8) | 33.7 (92.7) | 36.3 (97.3) | 37.3 (99.1) | 36.9 (98.4) | 34.9 (94.8) | 33.0 (91.4) | 31.0 (87.8) | 28.6 (83.5) | 37.3 (99.1) |
| Mean maximum °C (°F) | 23.4 (74.1) | 24.1 (75.4) | 26.4 (79.5) | 27.9 (82.2) | 30.5 (86.9) | 33.6 (92.5) | 34.4 (93.9) | 34.2 (93.6) | 33.1 (91.6) | 30.6 (87.1) | 28.0 (82.4) | 24.7 (76.5) | 34.7 (94.5) |
| Mean daily maximum °C (°F) | 17.7 (63.9) | 18.3 (64.9) | 20.4 (68.7) | 23.1 (73.6) | 26.2 (79.2) | 29.4 (84.9) | 32.3 (90.1) | 32.0 (89.6) | 30.4 (86.7) | 27.0 (80.6) | 23.5 (74.3) | 19.6 (67.3) | 25.0 (77.0) |
| Daily mean °C (°F) | 15.0 (59.0) | 15.3 (59.5) | 17.1 (62.8) | 19.8 (67.6) | 22.8 (73.0) | 26.2 (79.2) | 28.8 (83.8) | 28.5 (83.3) | 27.0 (80.6) | 23.9 (75.0) | 20.4 (68.7) | 16.7 (62.1) | 21.8 (71.2) |
| Mean daily minimum °C (°F) | 12.2 (54.0) | 12.4 (54.3) | 14.1 (57.4) | 16.7 (62.1) | 19.8 (67.6) | 23.6 (74.5) | 26.0 (78.8) | 26.0 (78.8) | 24.3 (75.7) | 21.2 (70.2) | 17.6 (63.7) | 13.9 (57.0) | 19.0 (66.2) |
| Mean minimum °C (°F) | 8.2 (46.8) | 8.4 (47.1) | 9.1 (48.4) | 11.5 (52.7) | 15.2 (59.4) | 19.1 (66.4) | 23.7 (74.7) | 23.8 (74.8) | 21.0 (69.8) | 16.9 (62.4) | 13.0 (55.4) | 9.8 (49.6) | 7.6 (45.7) |
| Record low °C (°F) | 4.4 (39.9) | 3.1 (37.6) | 4.7 (40.5) | 6.6 (43.9) | 9.4 (48.9) | 13.9 (57.0) | 18.8 (65.8) | 19.6 (67.3) | 15.3 (59.5) | 11.2 (52.2) | 8.2 (46.8) | 6.1 (43.0) | 3.1 (37.6) |
| Average precipitation mm (inches) | 184.1 (7.25) | 161.6 (6.36) | 210.1 (8.27) | 213.9 (8.42) | 278.1 (10.95) | 427.4 (16.83) | 214.9 (8.46) | 294.4 (11.59) | 346.0 (13.62) | 261.3 (10.29) | 173.6 (6.83) | 170.4 (6.71) | 2,935.7 (115.58) |
| Average precipitation days (≥ 1.0 mm) | 15.1 | 13.6 | 14.4 | 12.7 | 13.7 | 16.2 | 10.4 | 13.7 | 14.8 | 12.8 | 10.6 | 13.8 | 161.8 |
| Average relative humidity (%) | 68 | 70 | 70 | 73 | 77 | 80 | 77 | 78 | 78 | 75 | 72 | 69 | 74 |
| Mean monthly sunshine hours | 58.7 | 63.3 | 89.3 | 110.6 | 122.8 | 116.4 | 199.2 | 176.3 | 135.0 | 107.9 | 86.1 | 66.5 | 1,332.1 |
Source: Japan Meteorological Agency

=== Surrounding municipalities ===
- Setouchi
- Tatsugō
- Uken
- Yamato

== Transportation ==
=== Airport ===
- Amami Airport

=== Seaport ===
Naze Port is a regional transportation hub, with frequent ferry service to Kagoshima, Tokyo, Kobe, and Osaka, as well as Okinawa, the other Amami islands, and Tokara Islands.

=== Highway ===
- National Route 58

== Points of interest ==
- Amami Islands Botanical Garden

== Sister cities ==
- (Japan) Nishinomiya, Hyōgo
- (United States) Nacogdoches, Texas

== Notable people from Amami ==
- Kousuke Atari, musician
- Utami Hayashishita, Japanese professional wrestler
- Kyokunankai Hiromitsu, former sumo wrestler (real name: Hirokazu Ken, Japanese: 健博和, Ken Hirokazu)
- Kazuhito Sakae, olympic wrestling coach and retired freestyle wrestler and Greco-Roman wrestler
- Ayami Sato, professional baseball pitcher
