= Praolia yakushimana =

Scientific classification
- Kingdom: Animalia
- Phylum: Arthropoda
- Clade: Pancrustacea
- Class: Insecta
- Order: Coleoptera
- Suborder: Polyphaga
- Infraorder: Cucujiformia
- Family: Cerambycidae
- Genus: Praolia
- Species: P. yakushimana

Binomial name
- Praolia yakushimana Hayashi, 1976

Species of beetle

Praolia yakushimana is a species of beetle in the family Cerambycidae. It was described by Masao Hayashi in 1976. It is known from the eponymous Yakushima Island (Japan).

Praolia yakushimana measure 5.2–7.5 mm (0.20–0.30 in).
