= Uken =

Village in Kagoshima Prefecture, Japan

Uken 宇検村 Ukin
- Village
- Flag Seal

- Location of Uken in Kagoshima Prefecture

- Coordinates: 28°16′31″N 129°15′48″E
- Country: Japan
- Region: Kyushu (Amami Islands)
- Prefecture: Kagoshima Prefecture
- District: Ōshima

Area
  - Total: 103.07 km^{2} (39.80 sq mi)

Population (October 1, 2020)
  - Total: 1,621
  - Density: 15.73/km^{2} (40.7/sq mi)
- Time zone: UTC+9 (Japan Standard Time)
- Symbols
  - Tree: Schima liukiuensis Nakai
  - Flower: Hibiscus
  - Bird: Ryukyu robin
- Phone number: 0997-67-2211
- Address: 915, Uwan, Uken-son, Ōshima-gun, Kagoshima-ken 894-3392
- Website: www.uken.net

Uken (Japanese: 宇検村, Hepburn: Uken-son; Amami:Ukin) is a village located on Amami Ōshima, in Ōshima District, Kagoshima Prefecture, Japan.

As of October 1, 2020, the village had an estimated population of 1,621 and a population density of 15.73 persons per km^{2}. The total area was 103.07 km^{2}.

== Geography ==
Uken occupies the southern portion of the west coast of Amami Ōshima, facing the East China Sea. About 90% of the village is mountainous, and includes Uwandake, with a height of 694 metres (2,277 ft). The climate is classified as humid subtropical (Köppen climate classification Cfa) with very warm summers and mild winters. Precipitation is high throughout the year, but is highest in the months of May, June and September. The area is subject to frequent typhoons.

=== Surrounding municipalities ===
- Amami
- Setouchi
- Yamato

== History ==
Yakiuchi Village was established on April 1, 1908. It became Uken Village on November 1, 1917. Many inhabitants of the village emigrated to Brazil before World War II. As with all of the Amami Islands, the village came under the administration of the United States from July 1, 1946, to December 25, 1953. Efforts to merge the village with neighboring municipalities collapsed in 2005. In 2006, the village government expressed an interest to be considered as a potential location for the disposal of high level radioactive wastes to the Nuclear Waste Management Organization of Japan, much to the outrage of many inhabitants.
