= Naze, Kagoshima =

Human settlement in Japan

Coordinates: 28°22′N 129°29′E

Naze (名瀬市, Naze-shi; Amami:Naze) was a city located on Amami Ōshima in Kagoshima Prefecture, Japan. The city was founded on July 1, 1946.

As of 2003, the city had an estimated population of 41,778 and the density of 327.31 persons per km^{2}. The total area was 127.64 km^{2}.

On March 20, 2006, Naze, along with the town of Kasari, and the village of Sumiyō (both from Ōshima District), was merged to create the city of Amami. Although the town no longer exists as a legal entity, Naze is still referred to locally as the port and main urban district of Amami city.

== Education ==
Combined elementary and junior high schools in the former municipality included:

- Ashikebu (芦花部小・中学校)
- Okawa (大川小・中学校)
- Sakibaru (崎原小・中学校)

Junior high schools in the former municipality included:

- Asahi Junior High School (朝日中学校)
- Kaneku Junior High School (金久中学校)
- Kosyuku (Koshuku) Junior High School (小宿中学校)
- Naze Junior High School (名瀬中学校)

Elementary schools in the former municipality included:

- Amami Elementary School (奄美小学校)
- Asahi Elementary School (朝日小学校)
- Chine Elementary School (知根小学校)
- Itsubu Elementary School (伊津部小学校)
- Kominato Elementary School (小湊小学校)
- Koshuku Elementary School (小宿小学校)
- Naze Elementary School (名瀬小学校)
