= Praolia hayashii =

Scientific classification
- Kingdom: Animalia
- Phylum: Arthropoda
- Clade: Pancrustacea
- Class: Insecta
- Order: Coleoptera
- Suborder: Polyphaga
- Infraorder: Cucujiformia
- Family: Cerambycidae
- Genus: Praolia
- Species: P. hayashii

Binomial name
- Praolia hayashii (Hayashi, 1974)

Synonyms
- Serixia hayashii Hayashi, 1974

Species of beetle

Praolia hayashii is a species of beetle in the family Cerambycidae. It was described by Masao Hayashi in 1974. It is endemic to Taiwan.

Praolia hayashii measure 4–6.2 mm (0.16–0.24 in).
