= Yamato, Kagoshima =

Yamato 大和村 Yamatho
- Village
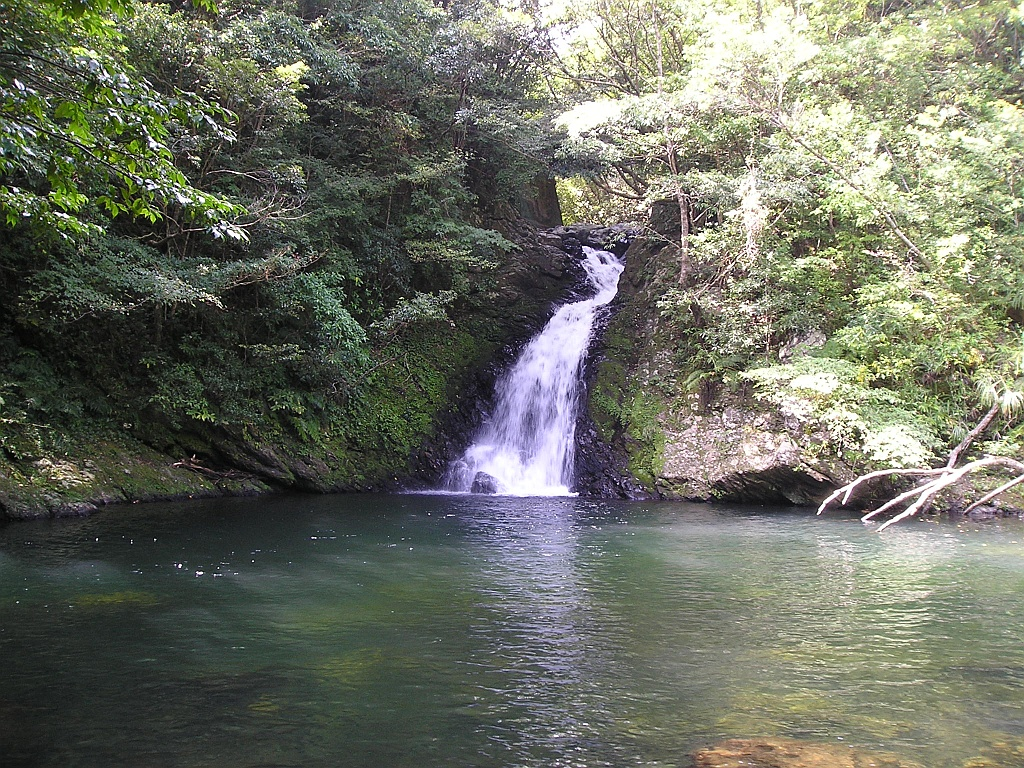
- Materiya waterfall

- Flag Seal

- Location of Yamato in Kagoshima Prefecture

- Coordinates: 28°19′7″N 129°21′27″E
- Country: Japan
- Region: Kyushu (Amami Islands)
- Prefecture: Kagoshima Prefecture
- District: Ōshima

Area
  - Total: 88.15 km^{2} (34.03 sq mi)

Population (October 1, 2020)
  - Total: 1,364
  - Density: 15.47/km^{2} (40.1/sq mi)
- Time zone: UTC+9 (Japan Standard Time)
- -Tree: Ternstroemia gymnanthera
- Flower: Taiwan Mountain Azalea
- Phone number: 0997-57-2111
- Address: 100, Yamatohama, Yamato-son, Ōshima-gun, Kagoshima-ken 894-3192
- Website: www.vill.yamato.lg.jp

Yamato (Japanese: 大和村, Hepburn: Yamato-son; Amami:Yamatho) is a village located on Amami Ōshima, in Ōshima District, Kagoshima Prefecture, Japan.

As of 1 October 2020, the village had an estimated population of 1,364 and a population density of 15.47 persons per km². The total area was 88.15 km².

== Geography ==
Yamato occupies the central portion of the northeast coast of Amami Ōshima, facing the East China Sea. The climate is classified as humid subtropical (Köppen climate classification Cfa) with very warm summers and mild winters. Precipitation is high throughout the year, but is highest in the months of May, June and September. The area is subject to frequent typhoons.

=== Surrounding municipalities ===
- Amami
- Uken

== History ==
Yamato Village was established on April 1, 1908. As with all of the Amami Islands, the village came under the administration of the United States from July 1, 1946 to December 25, 1953.

== Economy ==
The village economy is primarily agricultural, with sugar cane and horticulture as the main activities.
