= Praolia =

Scientific classification
- Kingdom: Animalia
- Phylum: Arthropoda
- Clade: Pancrustacea
- Class: Insecta
- Order: Coleoptera
- Suborder: Polyphaga
- Infraorder: Cucujiformia
- Family: Cerambycidae
- Subfamily: Lamiinae
- Tribe: Saperdini
- Genus: Praolia; Bates, 1884

Genus of beetles

Praolia is a genus of longhorn beetles of the subfamily Lamiinae. The genus occurs in East Asia (Taiwan, Japan, Korea).

== Species ==
There are four recognized species:

- Praolia citrinipes Bates, 1884
- Praolia hayashii (Hayashi, 1974)
- Praolia mizutanii Niisato, 1990
- Praolia yakushimana Hayashi, 1976
