= Ōshima District, Kagoshima =

District in Kagoshima Prefecture, Japan

Coordinates: 27°48′36″N 128°56′24″E

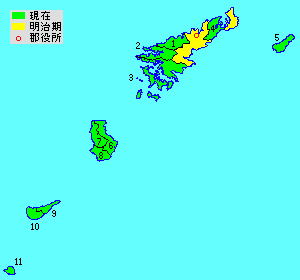
The location of Ōshima District in Kagoshima

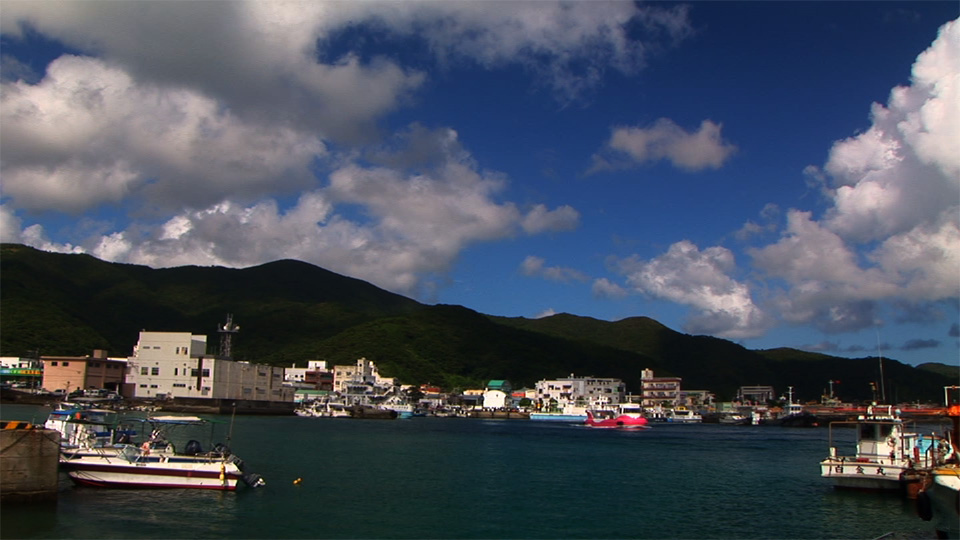
Koniya in Setouchi, Ōshima District, Kagoshima Prefecture

Ōshima (大島郡, Ōshima-gun) is a district located in Kagoshima Prefecture, Japan.

As of the March 20, 2006 merger but with 2003 population statistics, the district has an estimated population of 78,882 and a density of 84.4 persons per km^{2}. The total area is 934.10 km^{2}.

== Towns and villages ==
- Amagi
- China
- Isen
- Kikai
- Setouchi
- Tatsugō
- Tokunoshima
- Wadomari
- Yoron
- Uken
- Yamato

== District timeline (after WWII) ==
- February 28, 1946 – The district fell under United States Army control except for the current village of Mishima areas.
- July 1, 1946 – The town of Naze gained city status.
- September 1, 1946 – The village of China gained town status.
- February 4, 1952 – Japan regains the current village of Toshima areas.
- February 10, 1952 – The village of Mishima broke off from the village of Toshima.
- December 25, 1953 – The remaining parts of the district returned to Japan.
- February 1, 1955 – The village of Mikata merged into the city of Naze.
- September 1, 1956 – The town of Koniya, and the villages of Chinzei, Saneku, and Nishikata merged to form the town of Setouchi.
- September 10, 1956 – The town of Kikai and the village of Sōmachi merged to form the town of Kikai.
- April 1, 1958 – The town of Kametsu and the village of Higashiamagi merged to form the town of Tokunoshima.
- January 1, 1961
  - The village of Kasari gained town status.
  - The village of Amagi gained town status.
- January 1, 1962 – The village of Isen gained town status.
- January 1, 1963 – The village of Yoron gained town status.
- April 1, 1973 – The district transferred the villages of Mishima and Toshima to Kagoshima District.
- February 10, 1975 – The village of Tatsugō gained town status.
- March 20, 2006 – The village of Sumiyō and town of Kasari merged with the city of Naze to form the new city of Amami.

== Transportation ==
Kikai Airport is located in the district.

== Amami Reversion Movement ==
The "restoration of Ōshima District of Kagoshima Prefecture" was a slogan of the Amami reversion movement during the United States military occupation of the Amami Islands from 1945/6 to 1953. An overwhelming majority of people of Amami, including those in mainland Japan, urged the immediate return of the islands to Japan. The reversion movements except those by leftist minorities tried to differentiate Amami from Okinawa because the U.S. seemingly intended permanent control of Okinawa. They opposed the name "Northern Ryukyu" occasionally labeled by the U.S. occupiers. Instead they used "Ōshima District, Kagoshima Prefecture" as a symbol of national belongingness.
