= Amami Islands Botanical Garden =

Zoo and botanical garden in Amami, Kagoshima, Japan

Coordinates: 28°14′44″N 129°24′36″E

The Amami Islands Botanical Garden (奄美アイランド植物園, Amami Airando Shokubutsuen) is a zoo and botanical garden located on the grounds of the Amami Cultural Foundation, Yanma 811-1, Sumiyo-cho, Amami, Kagoshima, Japan. It is open daily except Tuesdays and Wednesdays; an admission fee is charged.

The garden contains a collection of more than 500 types of cactus and succulents, bananas, tropical fruit trees, and a greenhouse with begonias, calathea, heliconia, orchids, etc. The zoo contains animals such as meerkat, ring-tailed lemur, and squirrel monkey, as well as an aquarium. The cultural center features indigenous art of Southeast Asia.

== See also ==
- List of botanical gardens in Japan
