= Ōshima-tsumugi =

Traditional silk textile from Ōshima, Japan

Ōshimatsumugi (大島紬, Ōshima-tsumugi; Amami: Ōshimachimugi) is a traditional craft textile produced in the Amami Islands (mainly Amami Ōshima) in northern Ryukyu Islands, Japan. It is a hand-woven plain-weave silk cloth dyed in mud. The textile is most commonly used for making kimonos. Oshima-tsumugi kimonos are often simply called Ōshima.

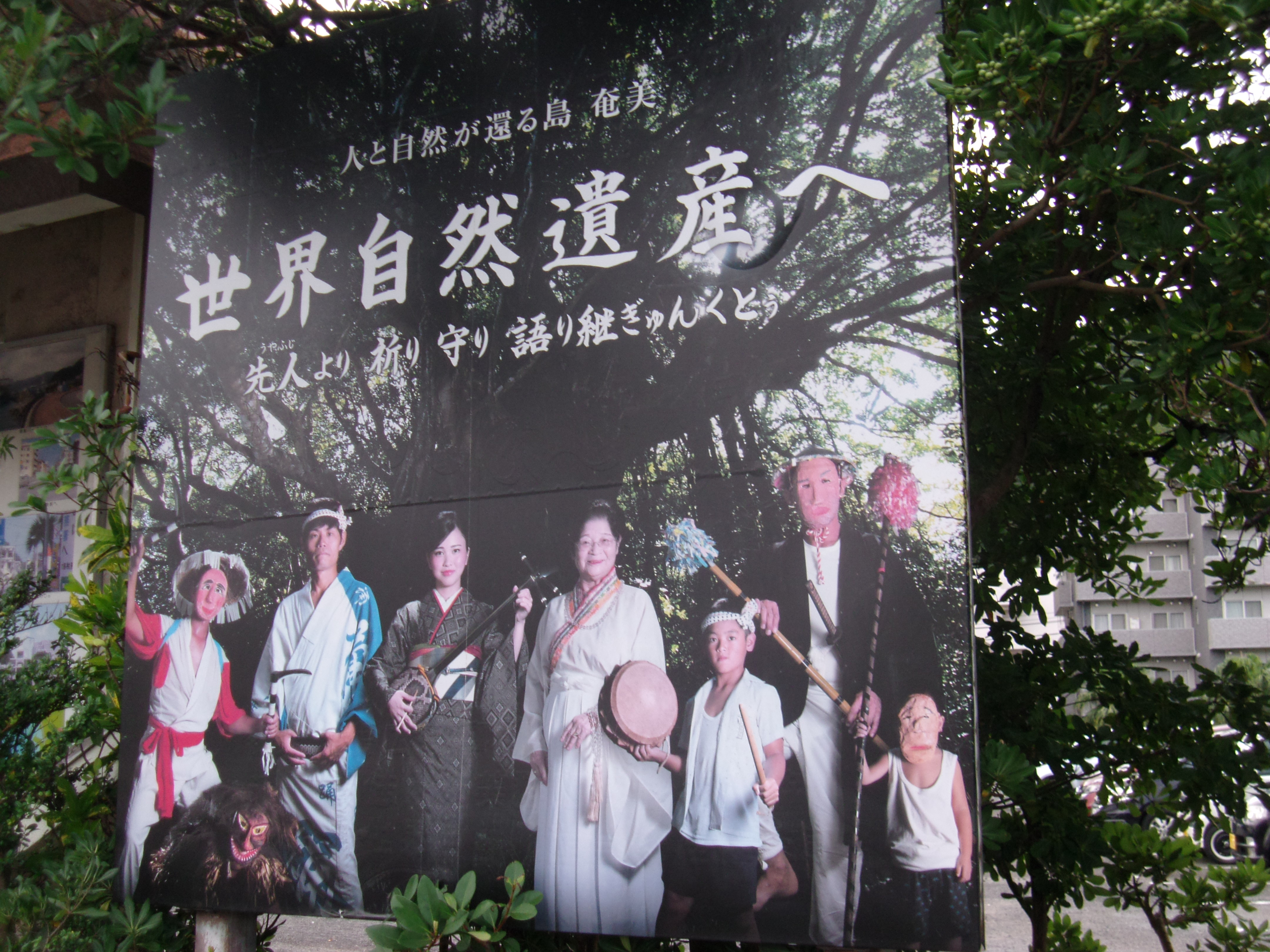
A woman wearing a Tatsugo pattern Ōshima-tsumugi on a World Heritage promotion poster

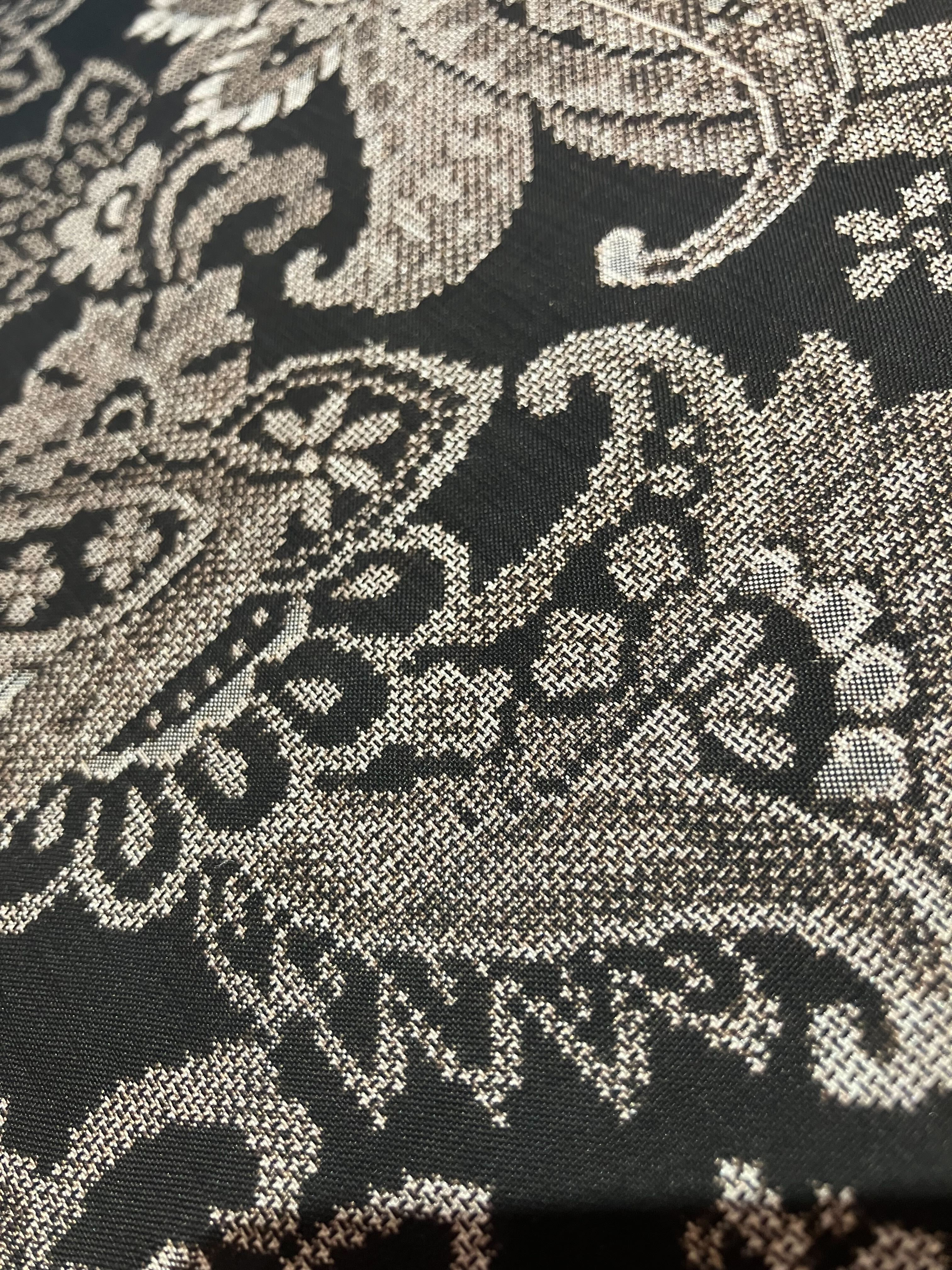
Detail of an Oshima kimono up close.

== Outline ==
Some consider Ōshima-tsumugi one of the three finest textiles in the world (along with French Gobelin weaving, and Persian carpets in Iran). Ōshima-tsumugi has a long history of about 1,300 years.

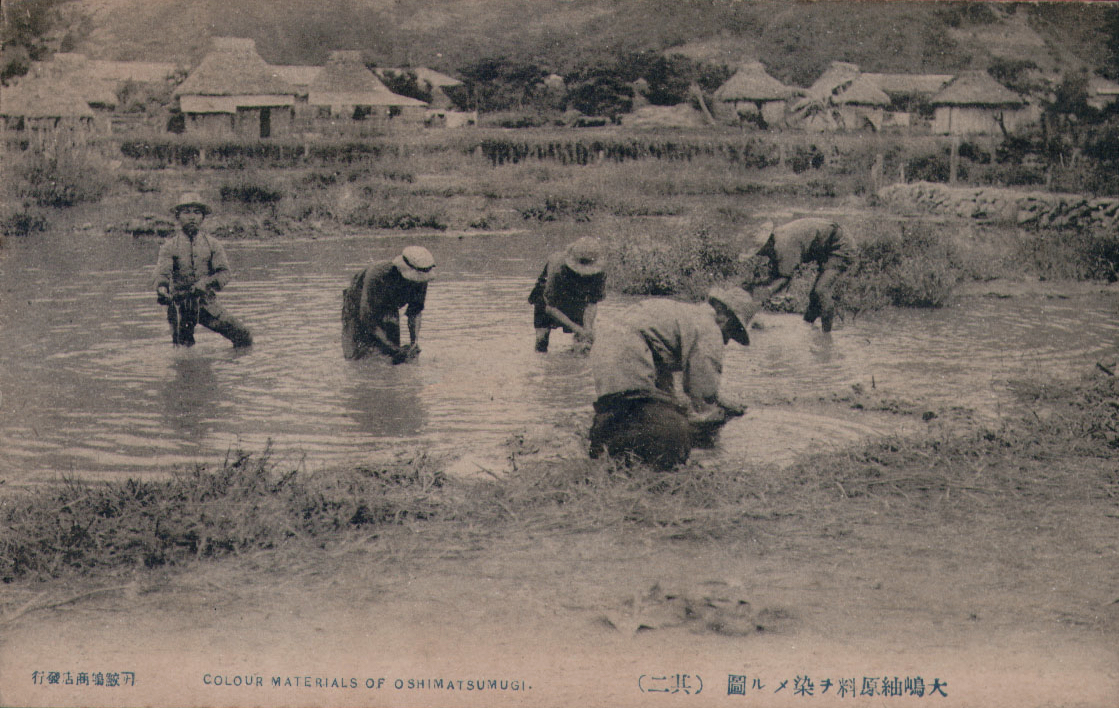
In the mud fields

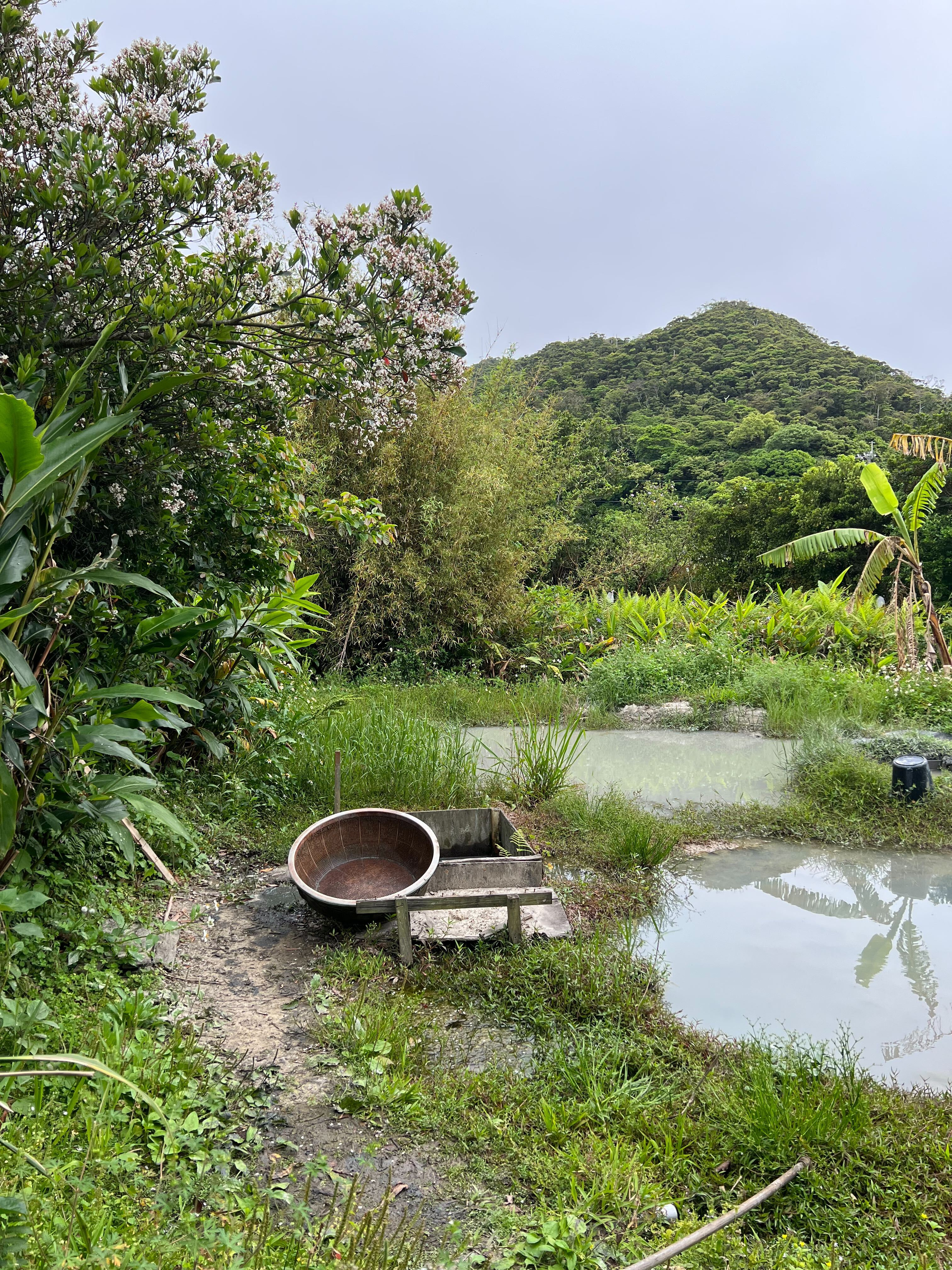
Mud dyeing paddy at the Kanai dyeing workshop

Ōshima-tsumugi is known for being supple, lightweight, and wrinkle-resistant. Ōshima-tsumugi kimonos are also traditionally dyed using mud and a dye produced from the bark of the Techigi Tree (Rhaphiolepis umbellata) Indigo and other natural dyes as well as synthetic dyes are also used. Due to its hardwearing nature, it is often said that up to three generations can wear the same kimono. Ōshima-tsumugi kimono are hugely valued for their detailed kasuri patterns and deep black color. They are regarded as one of the most expensive silk fabrics in Japan. The cheapest piece costs about 300,000 yen per bolt, or tanmono, and the highest quality costs several million yen.

Today, the colors and patterns are becoming more and more diverse, including "colored Oshima" and "white Oshima. Though Ōshima-tsumugi is mainly used for making kimono, small items such as coasters, neckties, and purses are also popular. There are fewer and fewer craftspeople creating Ōshima-tsumugi on the island, and the textile is facing extinction.

== History ==
The origin of Oshima Tsumugi is unclear, though it has been reported that this ancient technique goes back at least 1,300 years.

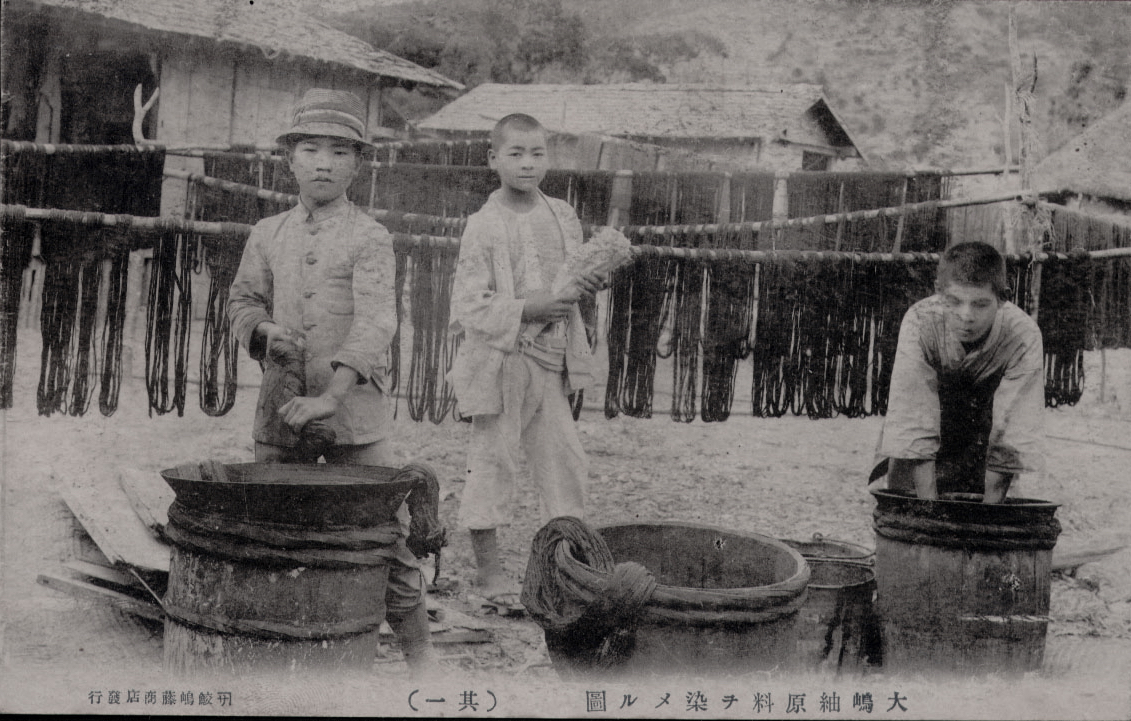
Pre-war Japanese postcard showing people dyeing Ōshima-tsumugi

The history of the important process of mud dyeing is long and is described in a book in the Shōsōin.

Traditionally, women would do the weaving at home, in between their chores, to contribute to the family income. By the latter half of the Edo period (1603–1867), Ōshima-tsumugi had become a specialty of Amami Oshima and, like sugarcane, islanders had to supply the fabric to the Satsuma domain in lieu of tax. This ended in 1879, when Amami Oshima became part of Japan. While production has decreased in recent years, many weavers still work from home.

== Production ==
Oshima Tsumugi kimono are produced in a lengthy process with over 30 steps.

Noribari 則張り

To prepare for the shimebata binding stage, 16–20 threads of about 16 meters in length, are grouped together, stretched between two posts, and covered in Igisu, a jelly-like paste made from seaweed. The threads must dry perfectly round for the shimebata stage, in order to create sharp kasuri.

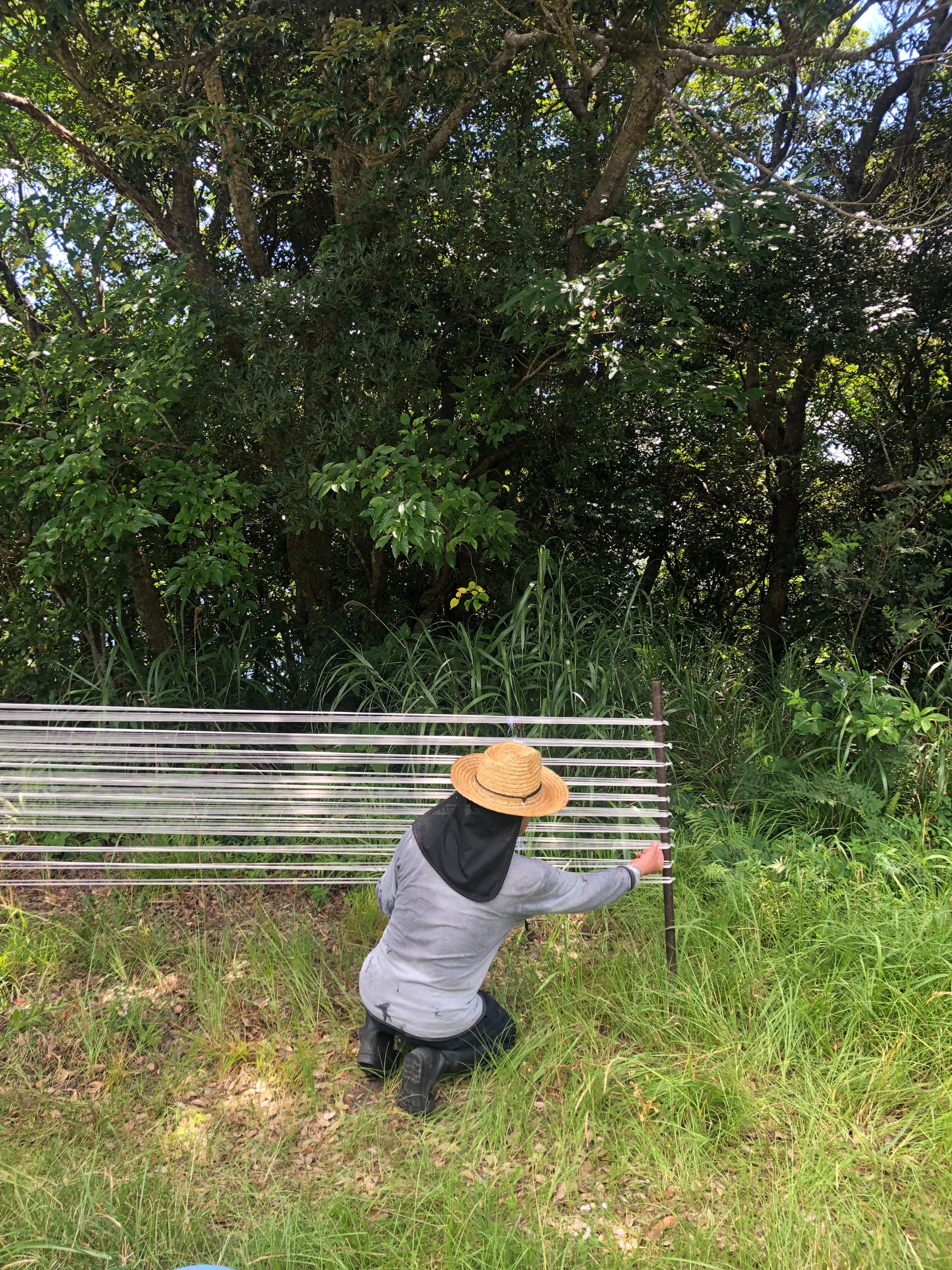
Silk threads are glued together with igisu, and stretched, preparing them for shimebata.

Shimebata 締機

Shimebata is the technique used to make the kasuri threads. The white silk threads are tightly woven with cotton threads creating a dense mat. Areas of the silk threads are exposed according to the design. When dyed only certain of the areas of the thread will take color.

Dyeing 染め

There are two main dyeing processes, one using a dye from the bark of the Techigi tree, and the other, mud. The Techigi tree is cut into chips and boiled down to a thick red liquid. The silk and cotton mats are first dyed in this dye turning them pink, and are then dyed repeatedly in the mud. The fabric goes from a light grey to a reddish brown, and finally to a rich, warm black. The tannin in the dye of the Techigi tree and the iron in the iron-rich mud react to create the black color, unique to Oshima Tsumugi.

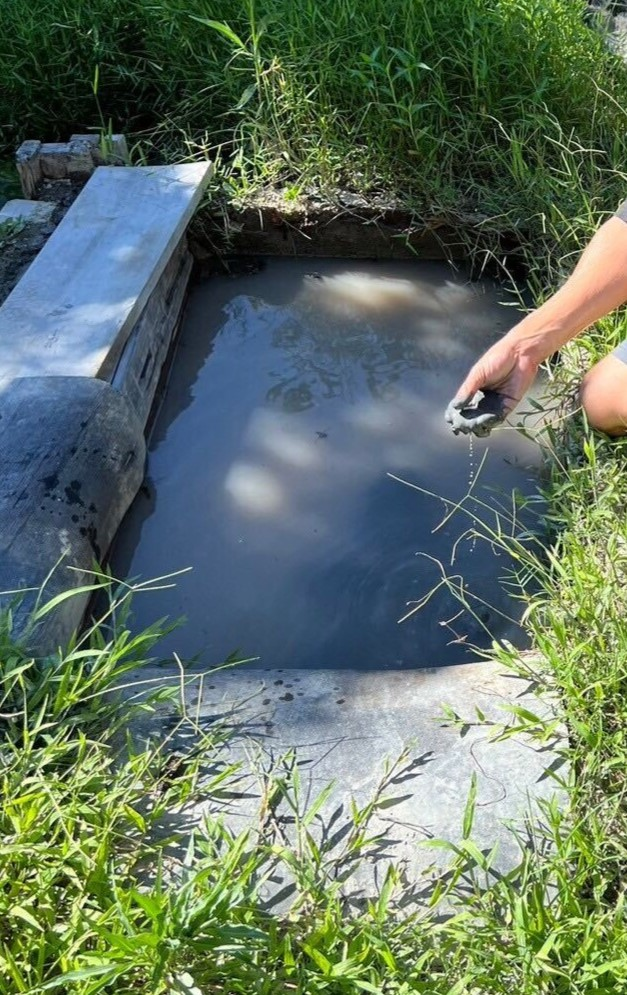
Mud Field at Kanai Workshop showing the fine silt mud

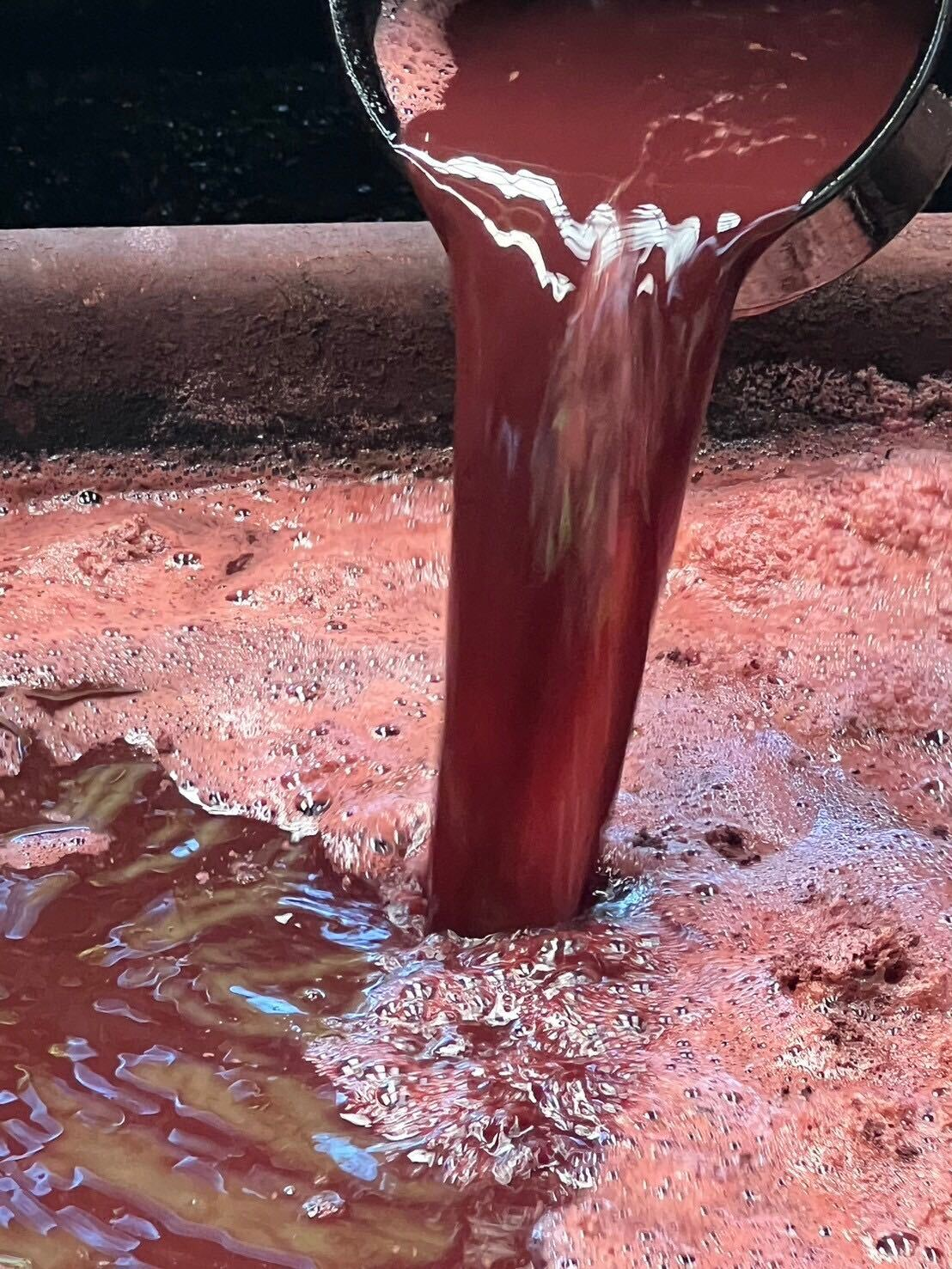
Tanin-rich dye from the Techigi Tree (Rhaphiolepis indica var. umbellata)

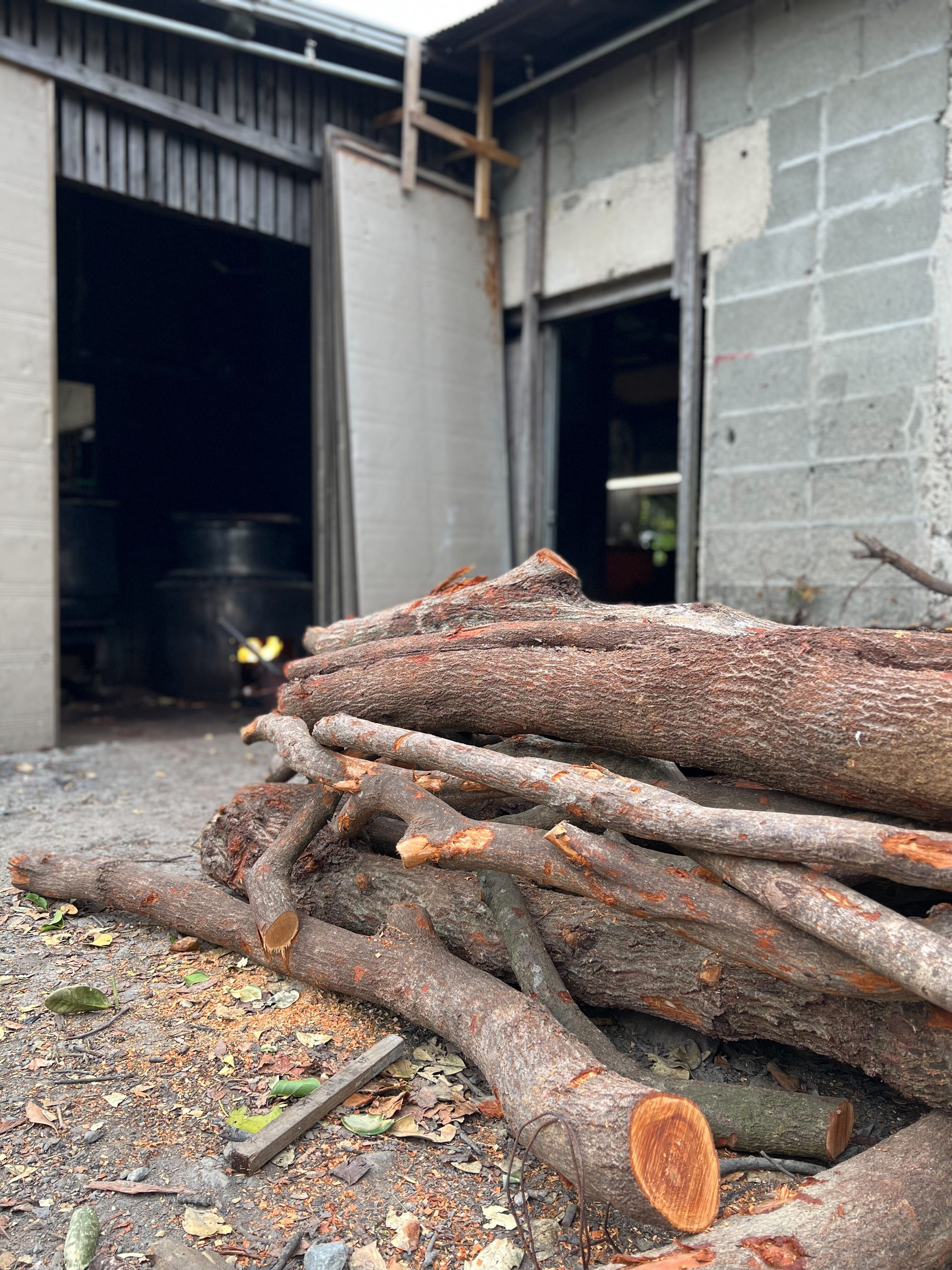
Cut techigi ready to be processed and turned into dye to dye Oshima Tsumugi

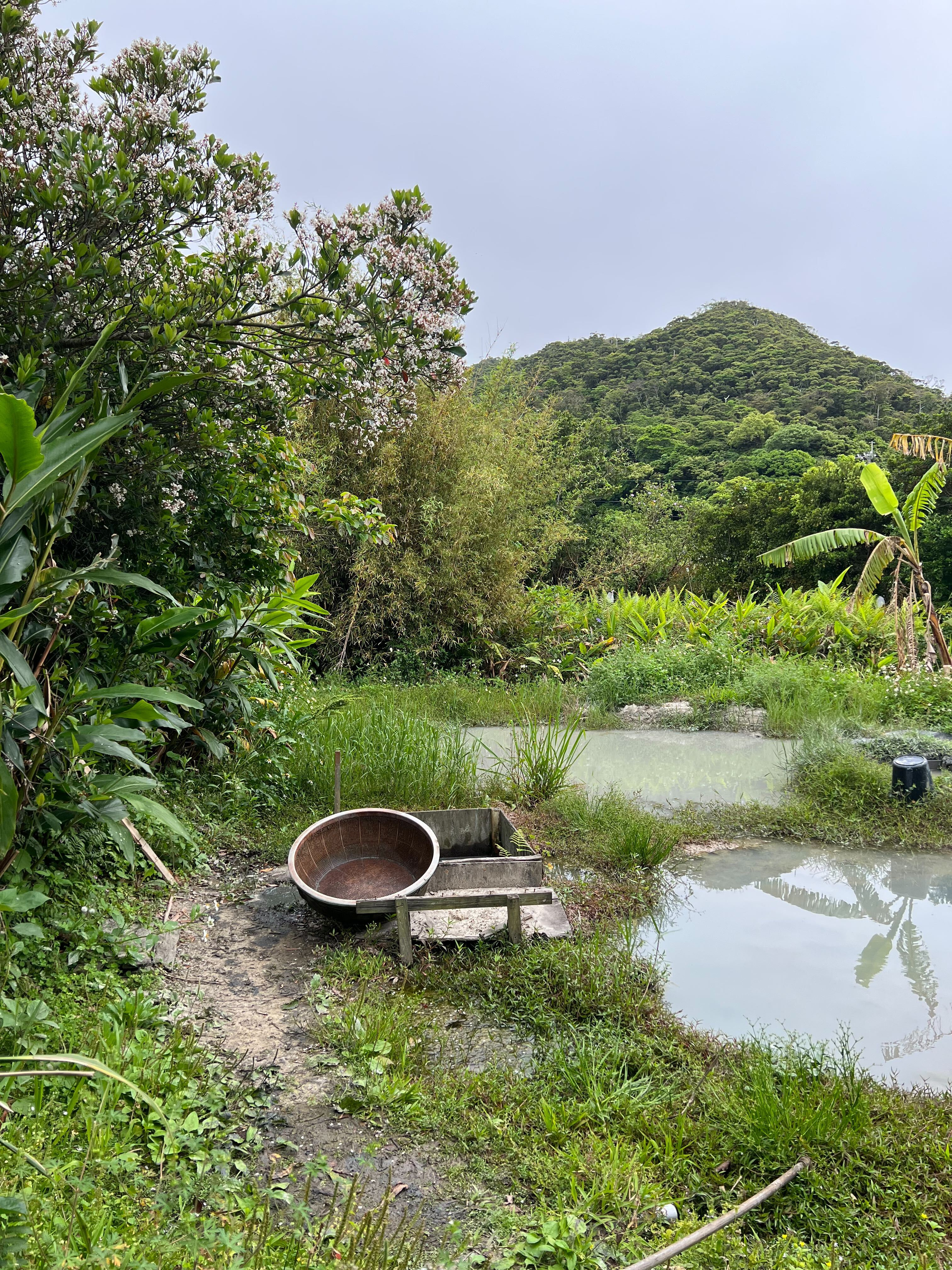
Mud dyeing paddy at the Kanai dyeing workshop

Sometimes when there is not enough iron in the mud, it does not dye well. When the happens, leaves from the sotetsu tree are put in the mud strengthening the chemical effect of the dye.

Barasaki バラ裂き

The silk threads are removed from the cotton threads, revealing the kasuri spots.

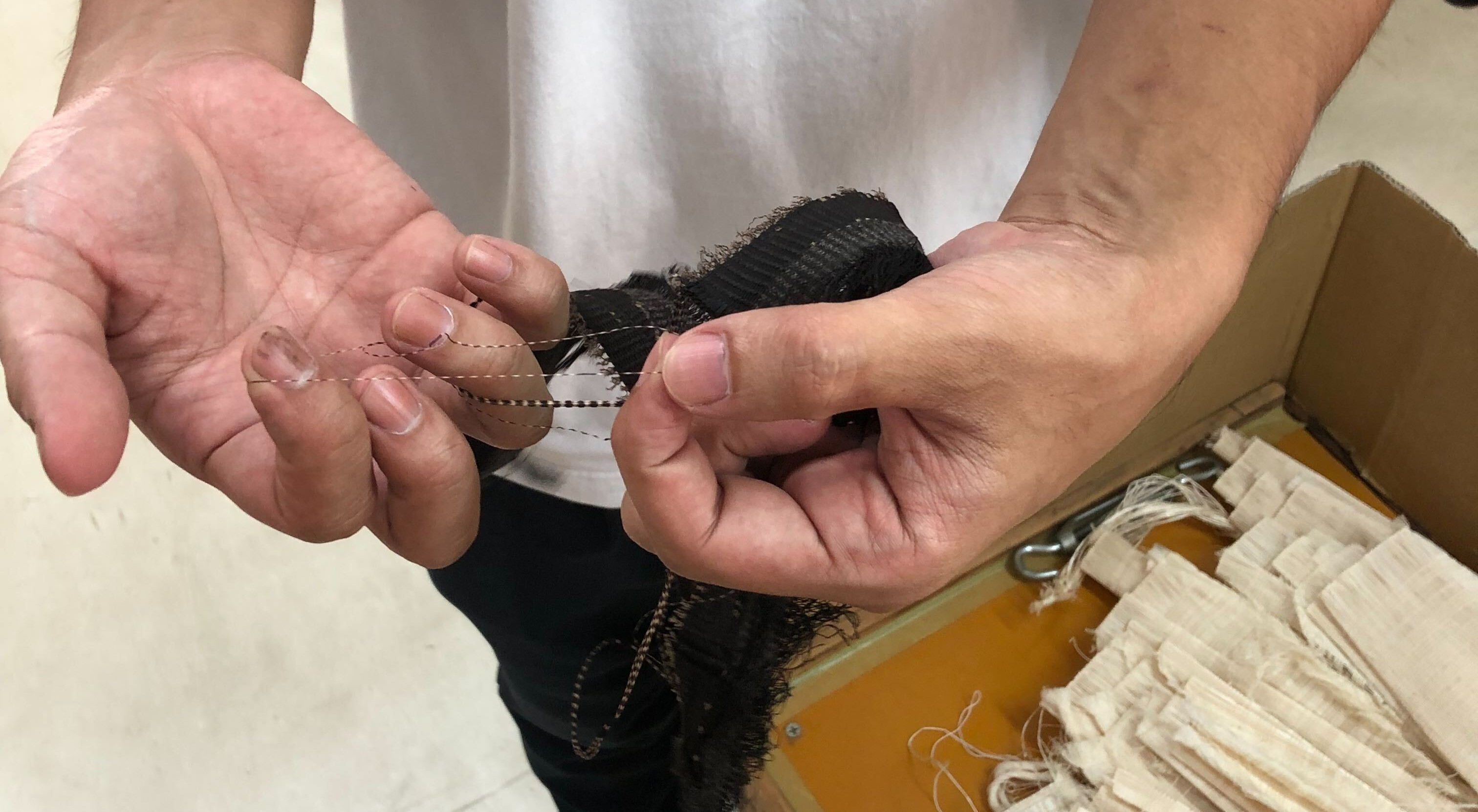
Oshima Tsumugi silk threads being pulled apart to reveal white spots of Kasuri

Hand Weaving 手織り

The hand weaving process is laborious, and depending on the amount of kasuri threads, can take from 3 months to 1 year to weave a single bolt(approx. 12 meters). Weavers usually weave at home, and only weave a few centimeters a day. There are two main types of kasuri weave, the more traditional hitomoto, where to warp and two weft threads meet to make a small dot, in a similar shape to a windmill. The other being katasu, where one warp thread is intersected by two wefts. katasu requires one less kasuri weft thread, making it slightly quicker to weave, though the patterns are considered to be more defined in hitomoto. Sometimes a simple one warp one weft juji kasuri can also be found.

== Associations and cooperatives ==
In Amami Oshima, there is an association called the Honba Amami-Oshima Tsumugi Textile Cooperative Association. Kimono produced in Oshima according to certain rules will receive a certification mark, defining it as "Honba Amami-Oshima Tsumugi". Bolts of fabric sold with this certification mark are of high value. The mark can be found at the foot of the roll of fabric.

In addition to Amami Oshima Island, the fabric is produced in Kagoshima City, Miyakonojo City, and various other areas.

== Producers ==
There are currently four main producers (Hata-ya) of Oshima Tsumugi on the island of Amami: Maeda Tsumugi Kogei, Tonari Orimono, Yumeorinosato, and Hajime Shoji.

== Patterns ==
Many traditional patterns are named after village names. These patterns, along with many other contemporary patterns are currently produced.

- Tatsugo-gara (龍郷柄) Derived from Tatsugou village, which is one of the biggest weaving regions of Ōshima-tsumugi. The pattern often features a pattern that depicts the skin of the poisonous Habu snake, and the zig-zagged leaves of the Sotetsu plant. The flowers in the pattern are sometimes dyed red. It is one of the most iconic Oshima patterns and can be seen all over the island.

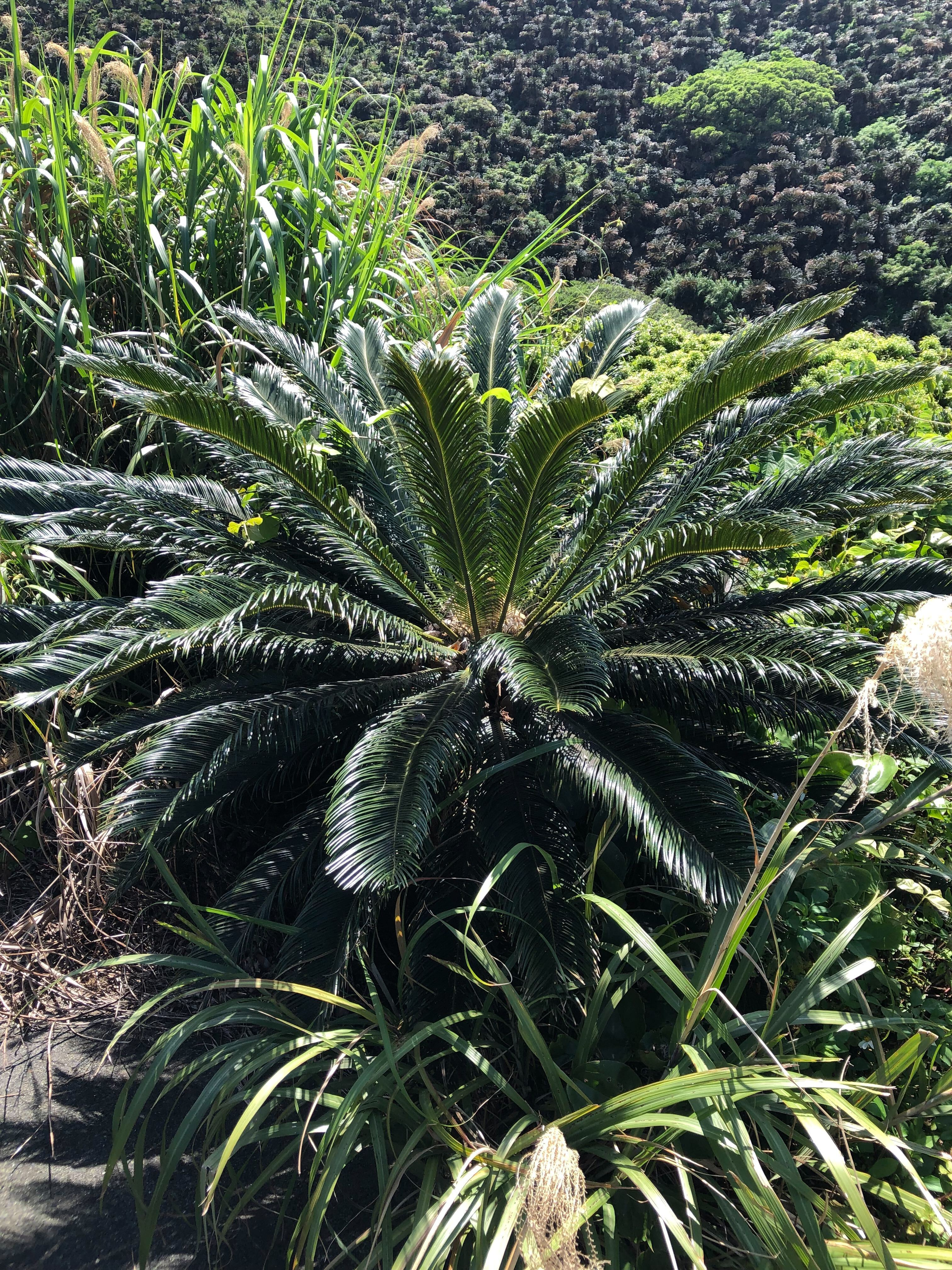
The Sotetsu Plant (Sago Palm)

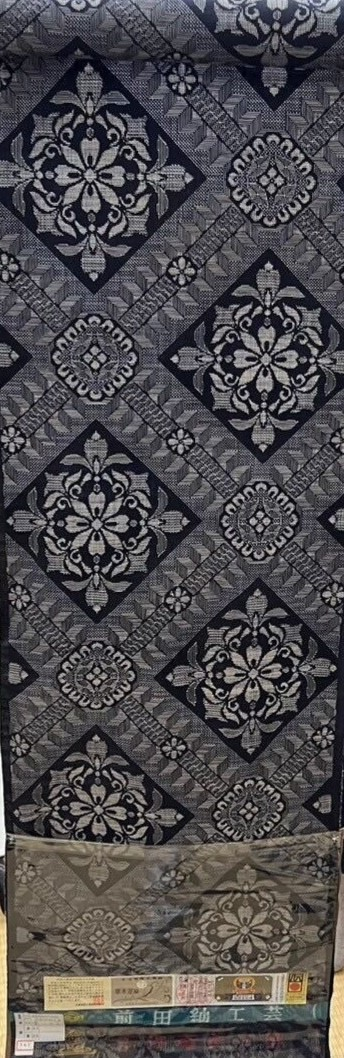
Tatsugo-gara, a traditional pattern named after the town Tatsugo-cho. The pattern depicts the sago palm, The habu snake, and flowers native to the island.

- Akinabara (秋名ﾊﾞﾗ) Named after the village of Akina. Bara derives from the word for basket or sieve.
- Arima
- Saigo

== Production areas ==
Ōshima-tsumugi is produced in three main areas: The island of Amami Oshima, Kagoshima City, and the greater Kagoshima Prefecture. Honba Ōshima-tsumugi was developed in Amami Oshima, and it is said that this technique was introduced to the Kagoshima mainland in 1874. There are two Honba Oshima Tsumugi unions, one in Amami and the other in Kagoshima City. Kimonos produced by the Amami union have a seal with a globe, and those produced by the Kagoshima union have a seal with two flags.

== Gallery ==
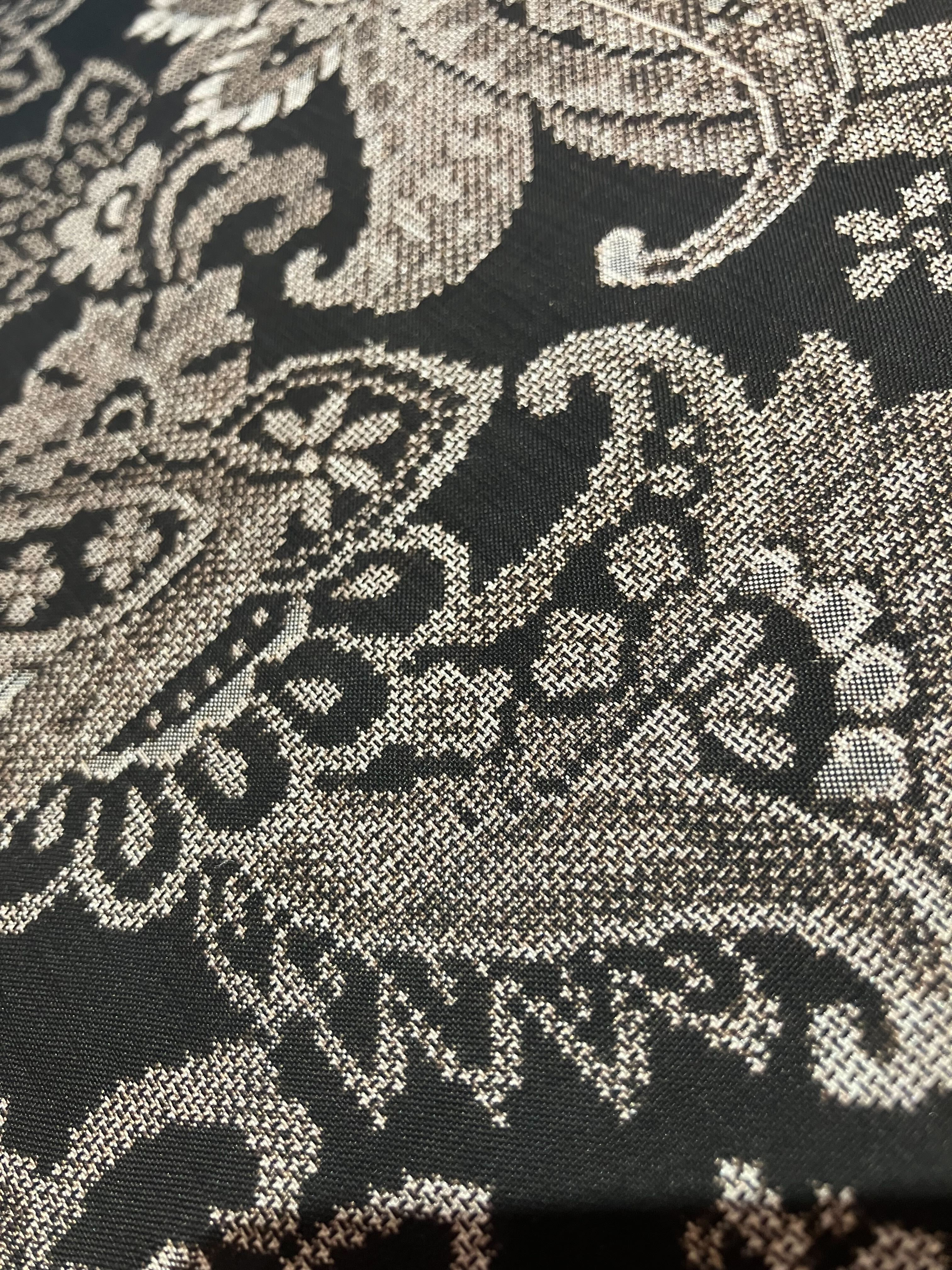

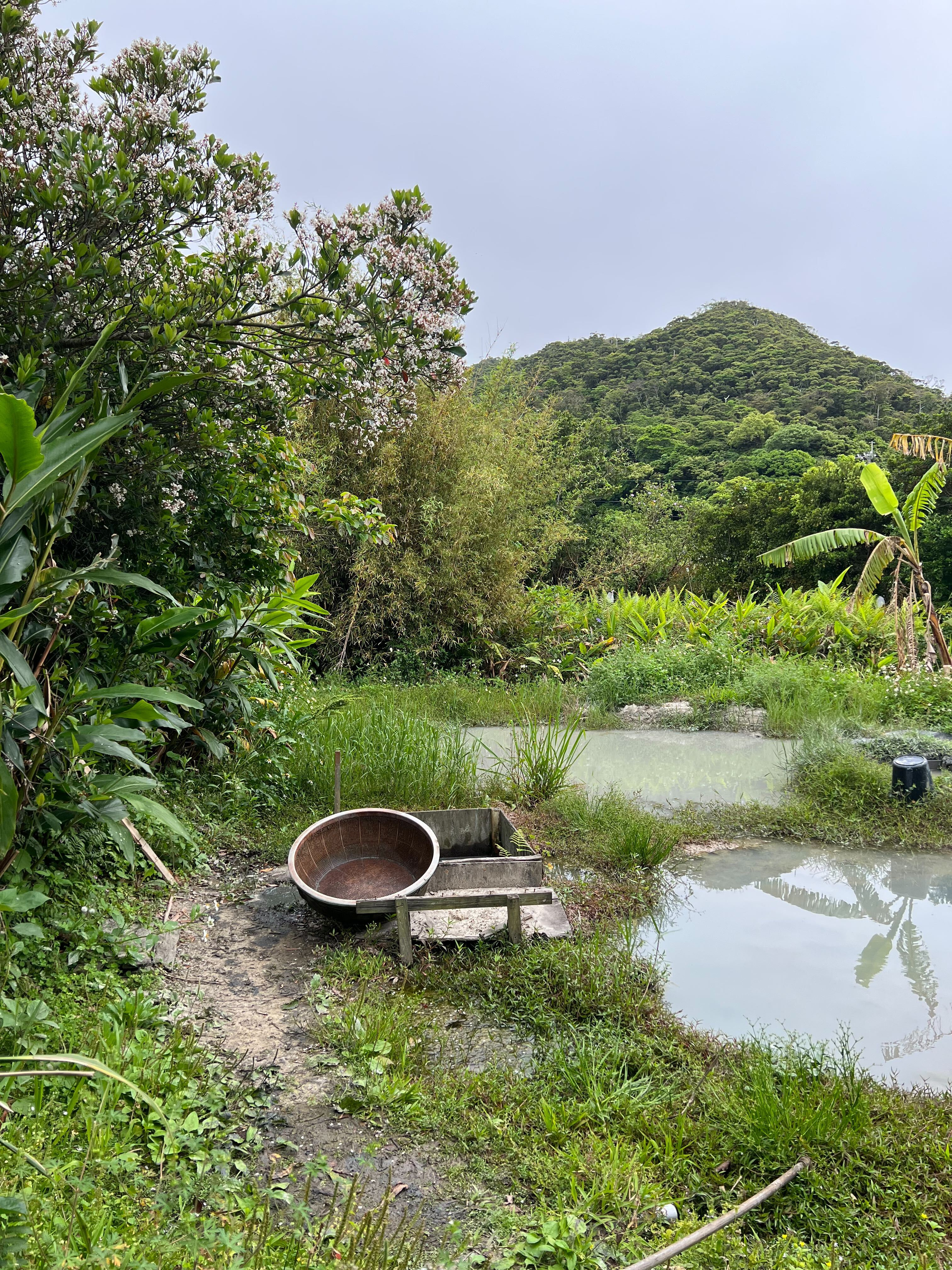

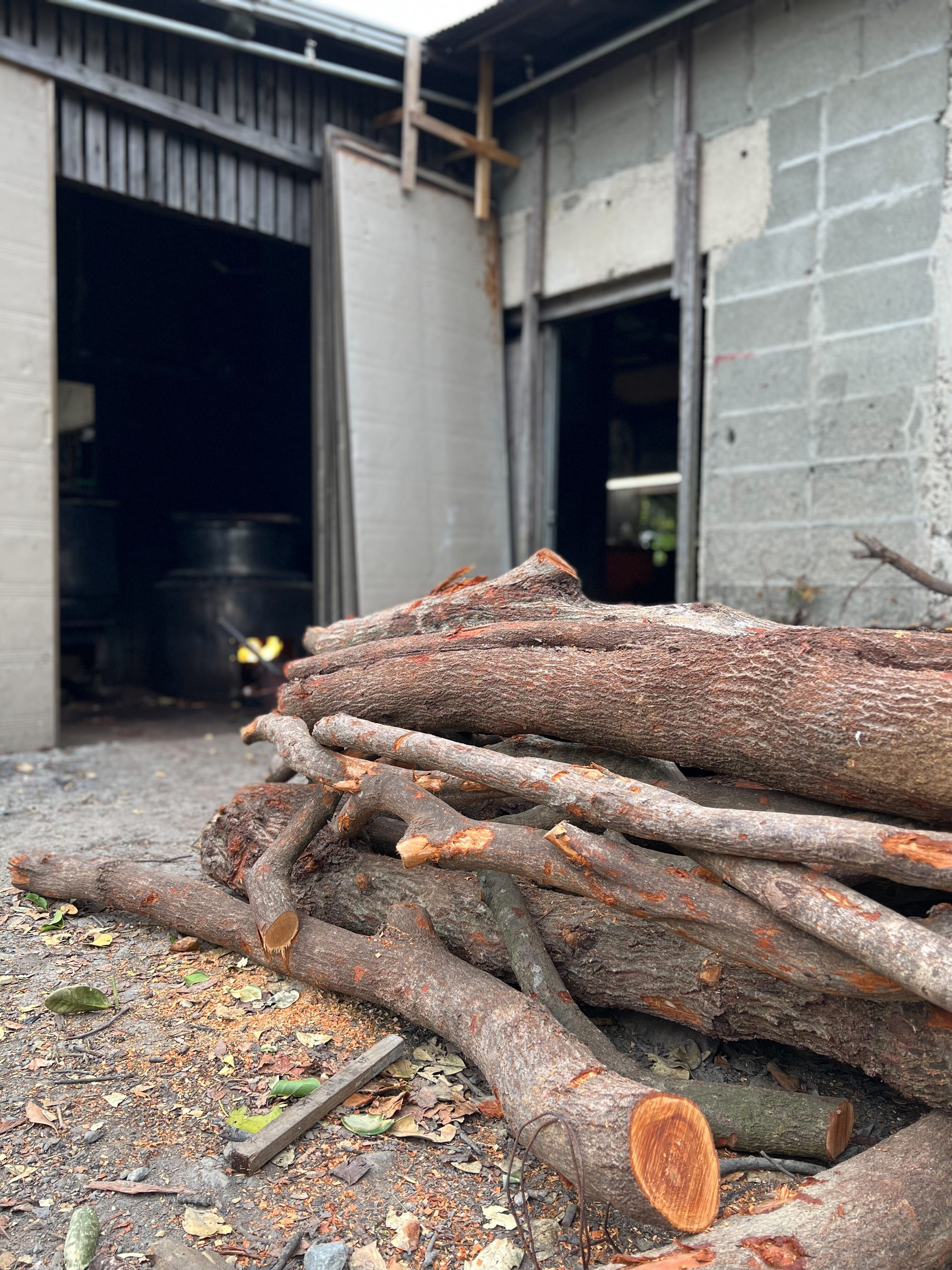

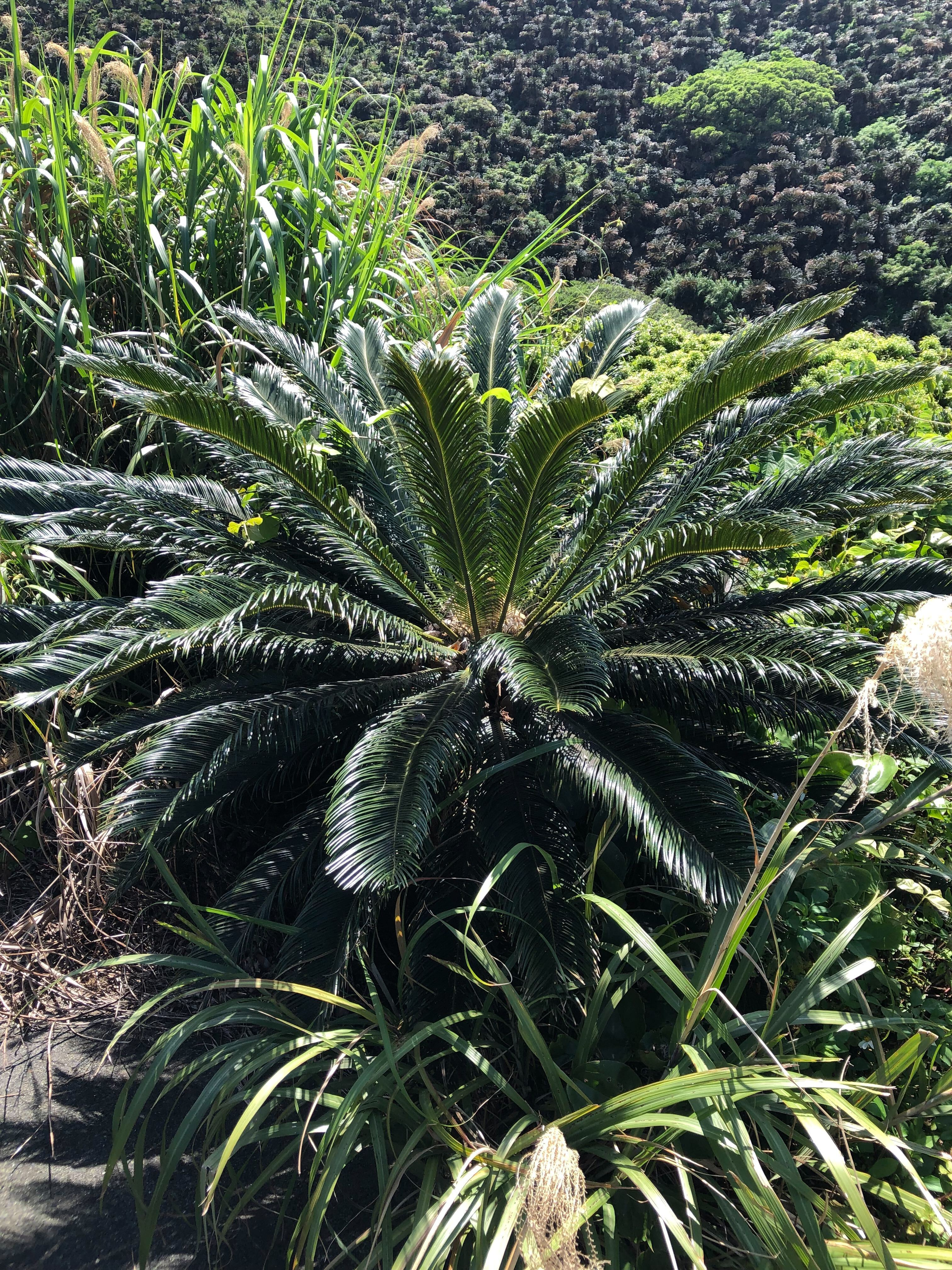

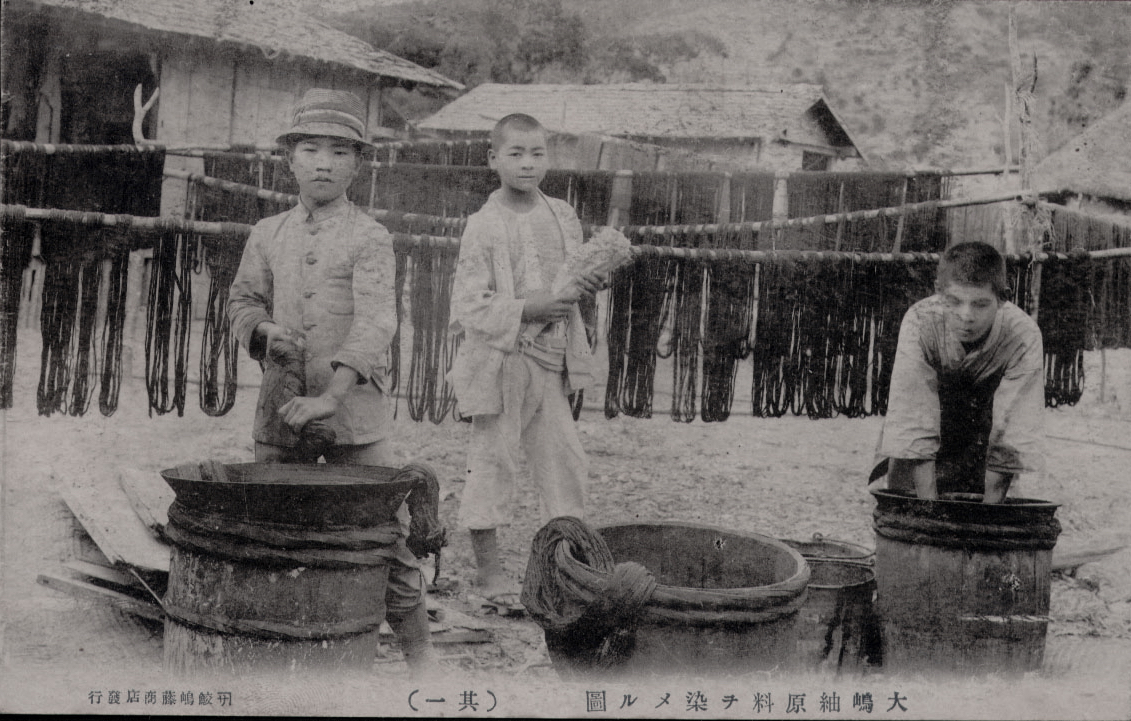

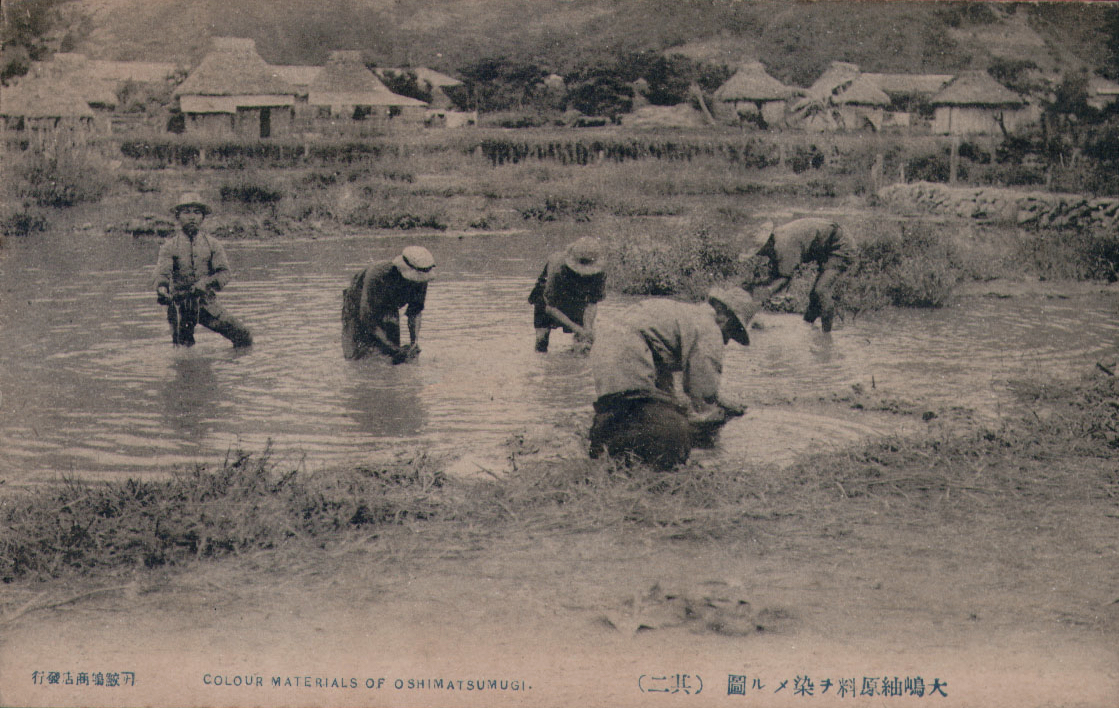

== See also ==
- Kimono
- Plain weave
- Twill
- Tanaka Isson
- Ryukyuan culture
- List of Traditional Crafts of Japan
