= Amami Ōshima =

Largest island within the Amami Islands of Japan

Native name: 奄美大島, Uushima
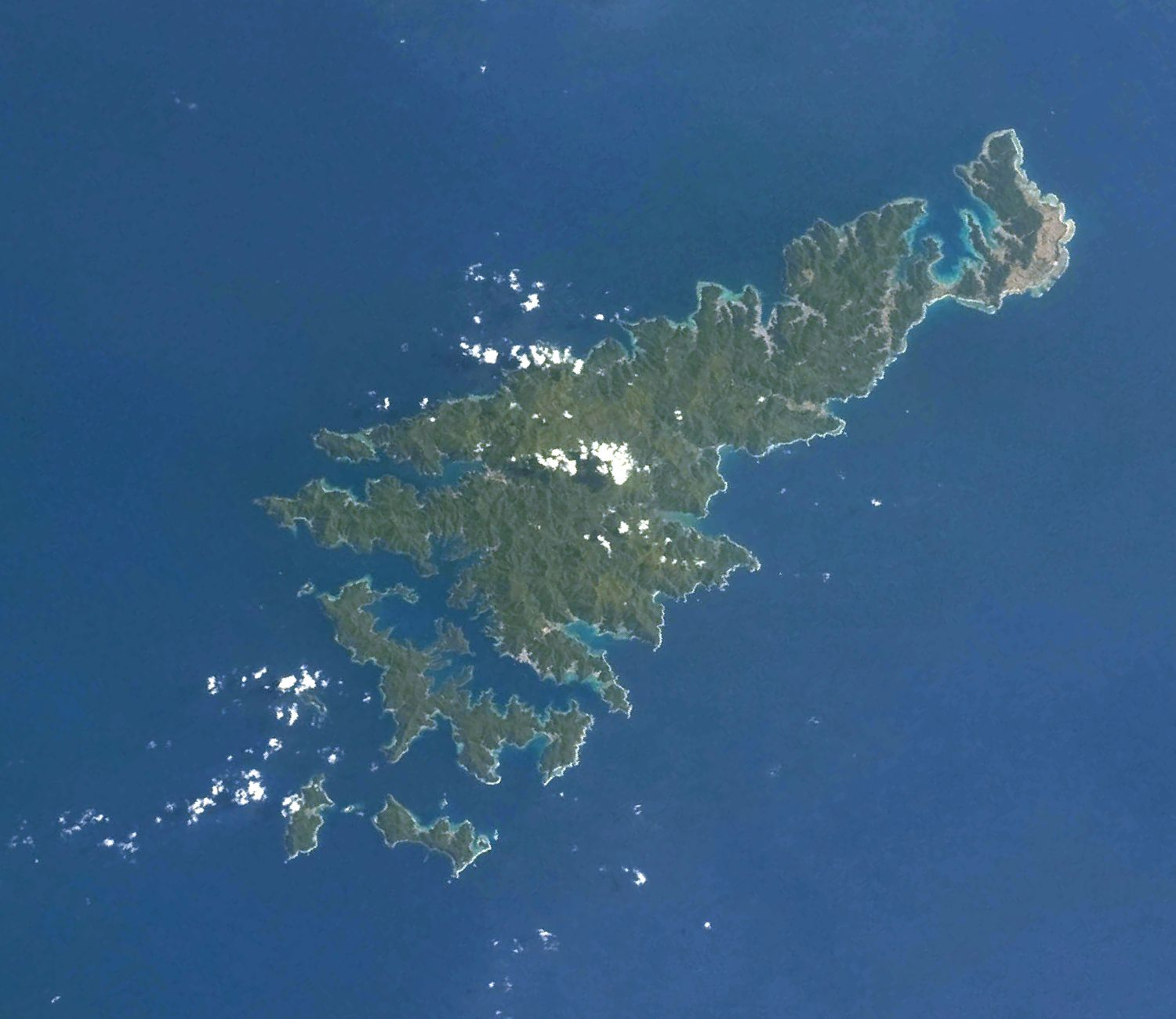
- Amami Ōshima

- Amami Ōshima (Asia)

Geography
- Location: Pacific Ocean
- Coordinates: 28°19′35″N 129°22′29″E
- Archipelago: Amami Islands
- Area: 712.35 km^{2} (275.04 sq mi)
- Coastline: 461.1 km (286.51 mi)
- Highest elevation: 694 m (2277 ft)
- Highest point: Yuwandake

Administration
- Japan
- Prefectures: Kagoshima Prefecture
- District: Ōshima District
- Largest settlement: Amami (pop. 44,561)

Demographics
- Population: 73,000 (2013)
- Ethnic groups: Ryukyuan, Japanese

UNESCO World Heritage Site
- Part of: Amami-Ōshima Island, Tokunoshima Island, northern part of Okinawa Island, and Iriomote Island
- Criteria: Natural: x
- Reference: 1574-001
- Inscription: 2021 (44th Session)

Amami Ōshima (奄美大島; Japanese pronunciation: [ä̀.mä́.mʲí ó̞ò̞.ɕì.mä̀] Okinawan: Uushima; Amami Ōshima: Ushima), also known as Amami ([ä́.mä̀.mʲì]), is the largest island in the Amami archipelago between Kyūshū and Okinawa. It is one of the Satsunan Islands, all of which belong to Kagoshima Prefecture, Japan.

The island, 712.35 km^{2} in area, has a population of approximately 73,000 people. Administratively it is divided into the city of Amami, the towns of Tatsugō, Setouchi, and the villages of Uken and Yamato in Kagoshima Prefecture. Much of the island is within the borders of the Amami Guntō National Park.

In 2021, it was listed as part of the serial UNESCO World Heritage Site of Amami-Ōshima Island, Tokunoshima Island, northern part of Okinawa Island, and Iriomote Island.

== History ==
It is uncertain when Amami Ōshima was first settled. Stone tools indicate settlement in the Japanese Paleolithic period, and other artifacts, including pottery, indicate a constant contact with Jōmon, Yayoi and Kofun period Japan.

The island is mentioned in the ancient Japanese chronicle Nihon Shoki in an entry for the year 657 AD. During the Nara period and early Heian period it was a stopping place for envoys from Japan to the court of Tang dynasty China. Mother of pearl was an important export item to Japan. Between 1571 and 1611, Amami Ōshima was briefly incorporated as part of the Ryukyu Kingdom as it expanded northwards along the archipelago. As Ryukyu was a tributary vassal of Ming China, this changed the status of the island as well.

To counter Ming authority, the island was invaded by samurai from Shimazu clan in 1609 and its incorporation into the official holdings of that domain was recognized by the Tokugawa shogunate in 1624. Shimazu rule was harsh, with the inhabitants of the island reduced to serfdom and forced to raise sugar cane to meet high taxation, which often resulted in famine. Saigō Takamori was exiled to Amami Ōshima in 1859, staying for two years, and his house has been preserved as a memorial museum. After the Meiji Restoration Amami Ōshima was incorporated into Ōsumi Province and later became part of Kagoshima Prefecture. Following World War II, along with the other Amami Islands, it was occupied by the United States until 1953, at which time it reverted to the control of Japan.

Since February 1974, a 7,861-hectare (19,420-acre) area that includes portions of the island and surrounding sea was protected as the Amami Gunto Quasi-national Park. The area also has a large mangrove forest.

In December 2001 there was a naval battle called the Battle of Amami-Ōshima between an armed North Korean spy craft and Japanese Coast Guard ships near Amami Ōshima. The spy craft violated the Exclusive economic zone of Japan. This was a six-hour confrontation that ended with the sinking of the North Korean vessel.

In 2017 the Amami Guntō National Park was established. It absorbed the former Amami Gunto Quasi-national Park and other land and sea areas in adjacent municipalities.

== Geography ==
Amami Ōshima is the seventh-largest island in the Japanese archipelago after the four main islands, Okinawa Island and Sado Island (excluding the disputed Kuril Islands). It is located approximately 380 kilometres (210 nmi) south of the southern tip of Kyūshū and 250 kilometres (130 nmi) north of Okinawa. The island is of volcanic origin, with Mount Yuwanda at 605 metres (1,985 ft) above sea level at its highest peak. The coast of the island is surrounded by a coral reef, and the island may also have been home to some of the northernmost coral reefs in Japan during the last glacial period. It is surrounded by the East China Sea on the west and the Pacific Ocean on the east.

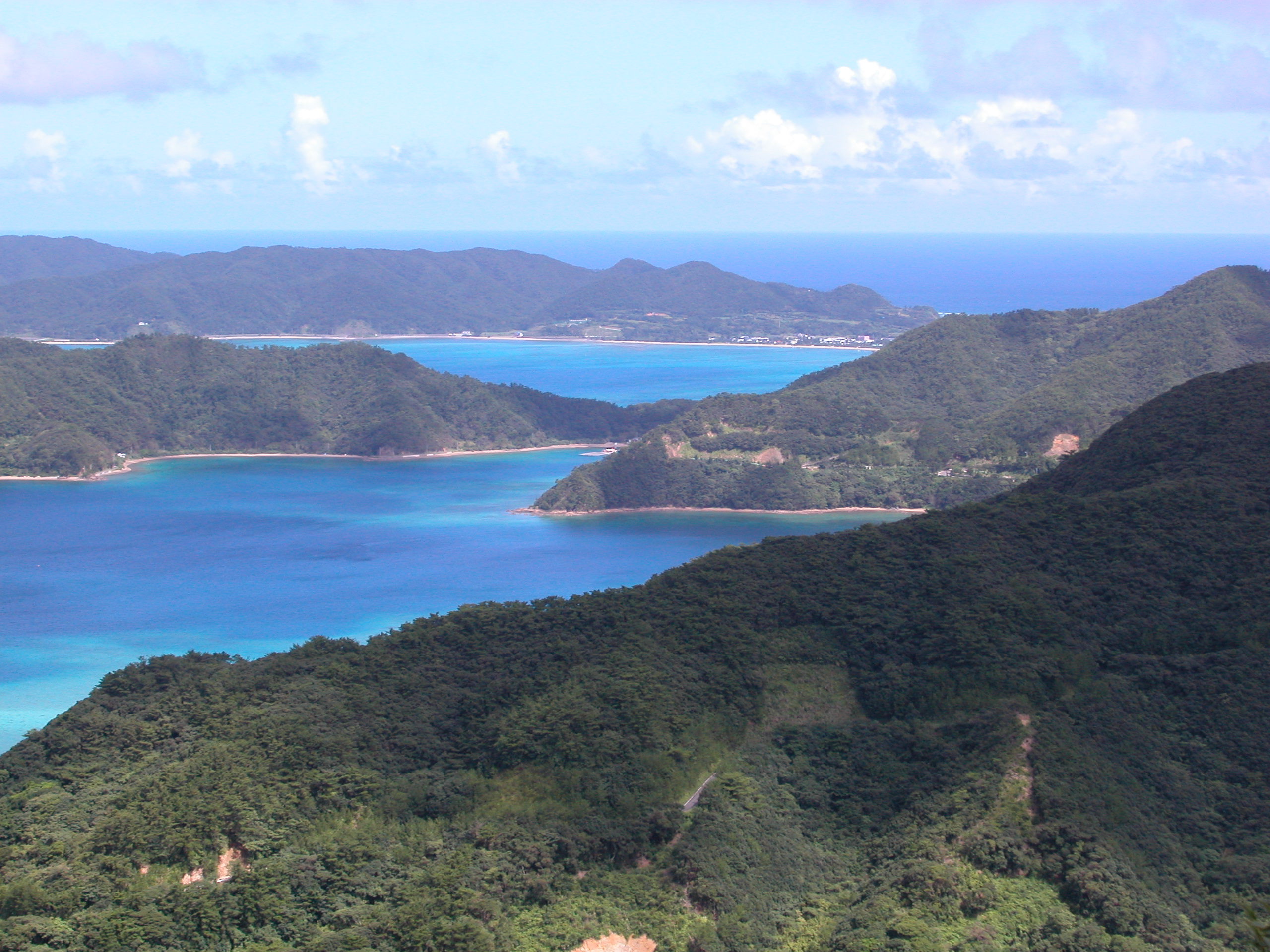
Coastal area of Amami Ōshima

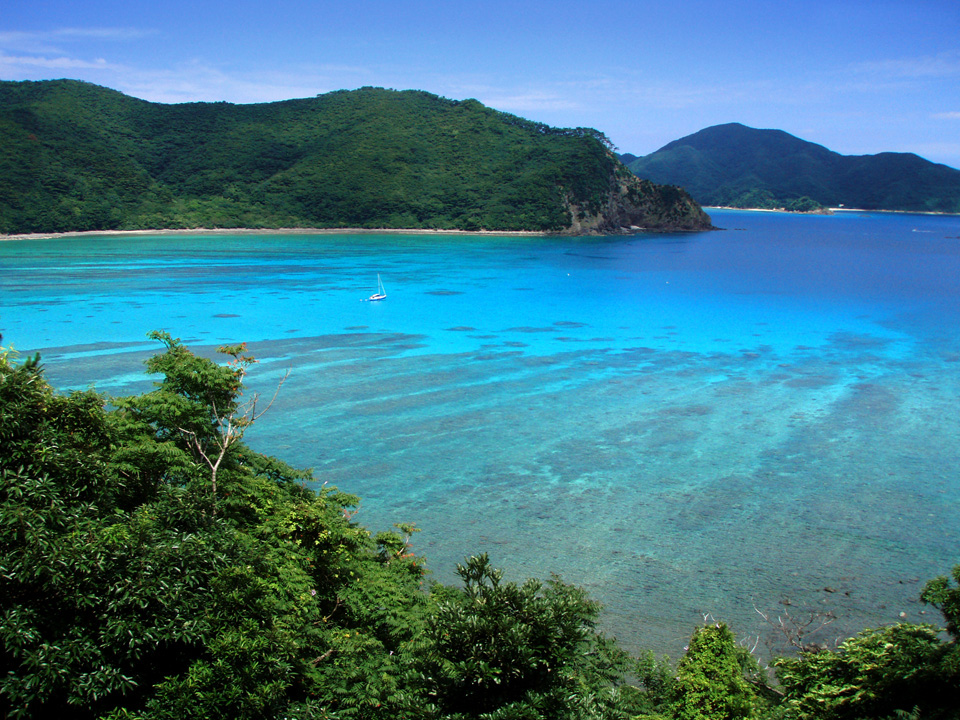
View of Katetsu cove from nearby Manen-zaki (Cape Manen)

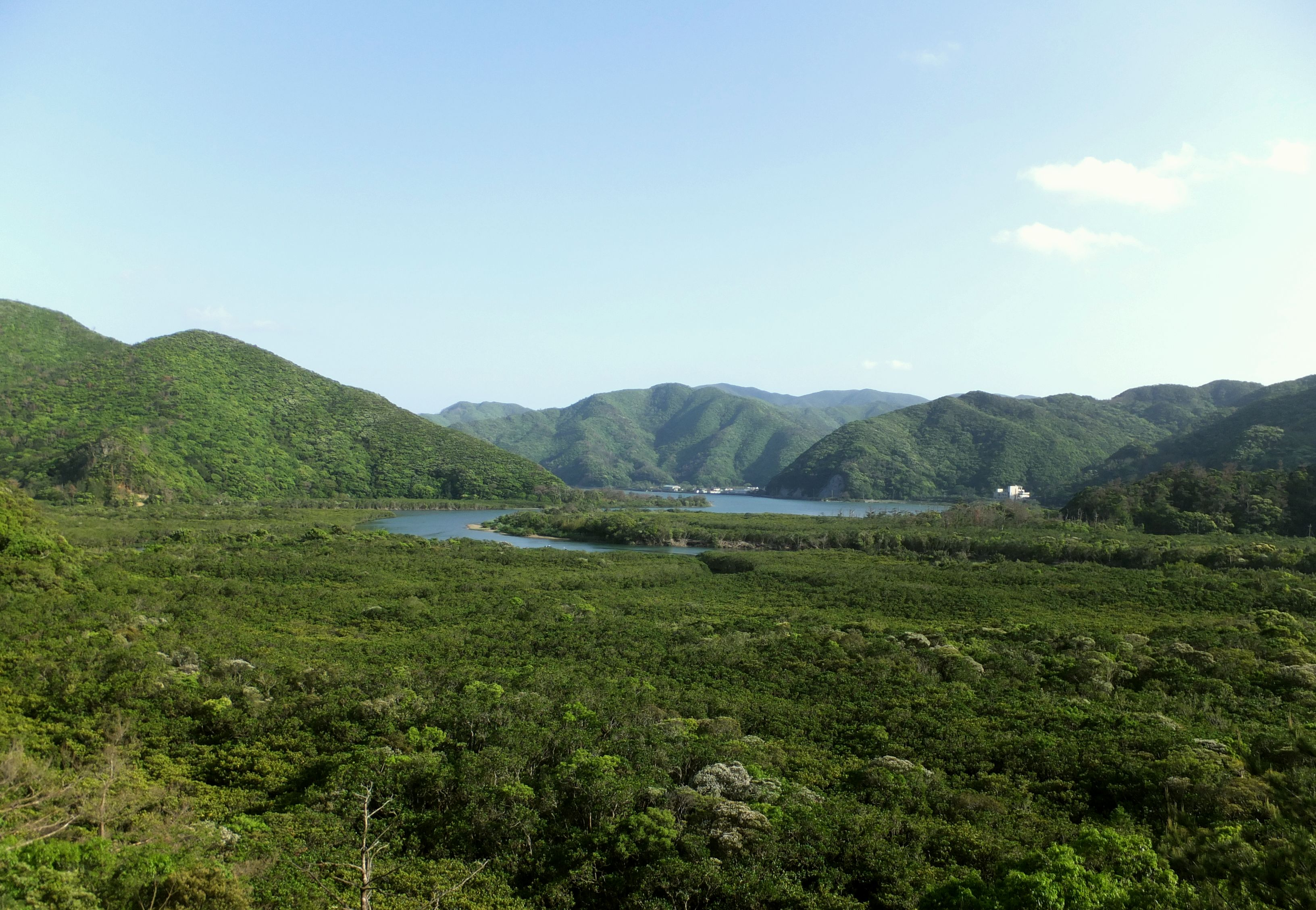
Mangrove forest of the Amami Guntō National Park in Amami Ōshima

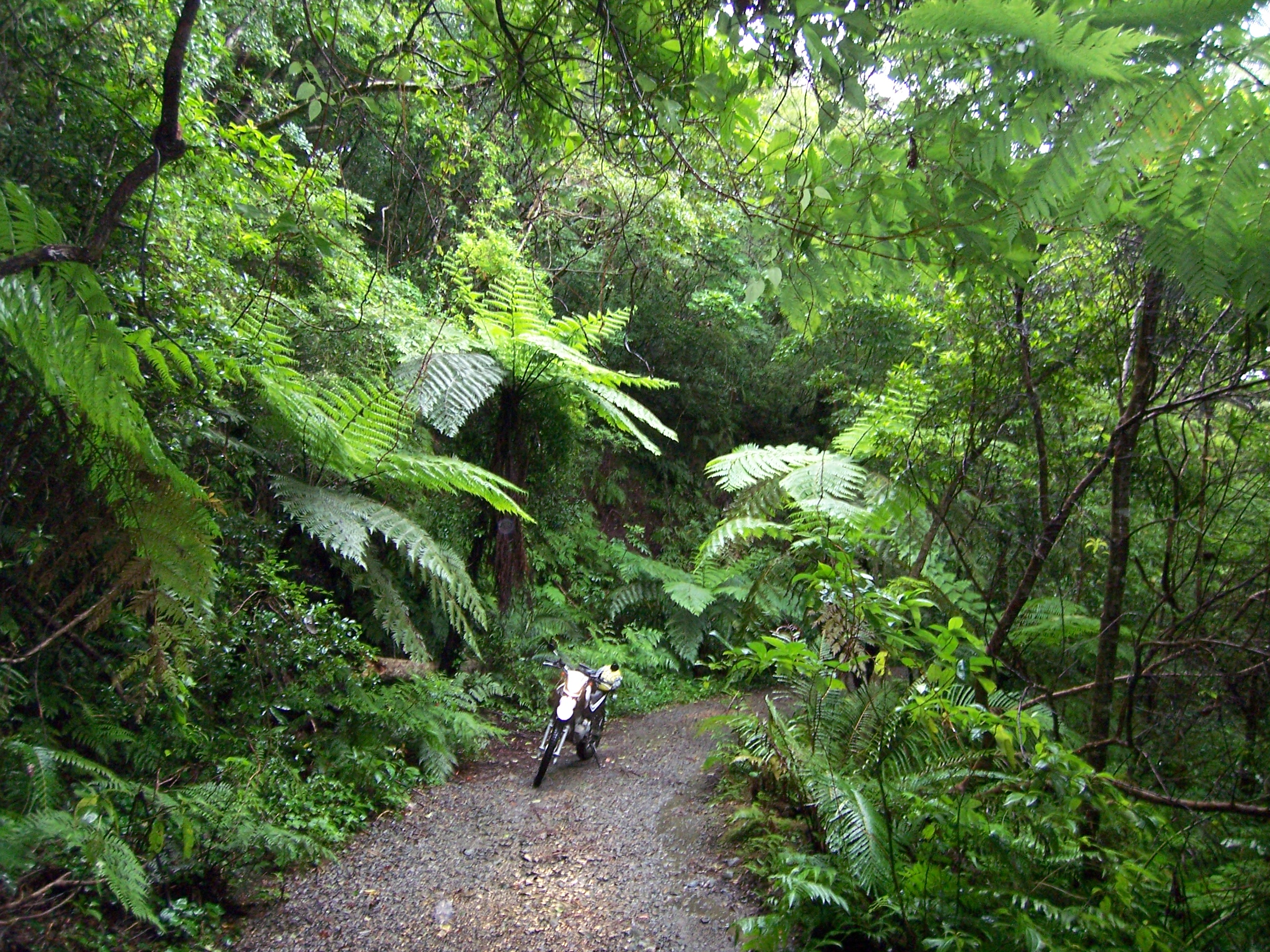
Kinsakubaru wildwood in Amami Ōshima

== Administration ==
5 municipalities of Amami Ōshima

Amami Ōshima belongs to Kagoshima prefecture. It consists of the following municipalities.

- Amami
- Tatsugo
- Yamatomura
- Usomura
- Part of Setouchi-cho

== Climate ==
The climate of Amami Ōshima is classified as a humid subtropical climate (Köppen climate classification Cfa) with very warm summers and mild winters. The rainy season lasts from May through September. The island is subject to frequent typhoons.

== Fauna ==
Amami Ōshima is home to several rare or endangered endemic animals, including the Amami rabbit and the Lidth's jay, both of which are now found only in Amami Ōshima and Tokunoshima. The Amami rabbit is sometimes called a living fossil because it represents an ancient Asian lineage that has elsewhere disappeared.

The island is also home to the habu, a venomous snake that can be found throughout the Ryūkyū Islands. Mongooses were introduced to kill the habu, but have become another problem, as an increase in the mongoose population has been linked to the decline of the Amami rabbit and other endemic species. After the mongoose population reached 10,000 by 2000, authorities launched an eradication campaign that led to the complete eradication of mongoose on the island by 2024.

Whale watching to see humpback whales has become a featured attraction in winter in recent years. It is also notable that North Pacific right whale, the most endangered of all whale species, have repeatedly appeared around the island (there are five records of three sightings, a capture, and a stranding since 1901) and as of 2014, Amami is the only location in East China Sea where this species has been confirmed in the past 110 years. It is also one of two locations in the world along with the Bonin Islands where constant appearance in winter has been confirmed since the 20th century. Discovery of Indo-Pacific bottlenose dolphins in Seto strait made it the first confirmation in the nation. Other species include whales (Bryde's, sperm), smaller whales or dolphins (false killer, spinner, spotted), and so on. Before being wiped out, many large whales such as blue and fin were seasonal migrants.

The island marks the northernmost limit of dugong distribution, with occasional sightings throughout the 20th and into the 21st century.

Amami Oshima is the only place where a nesting of leatherback turtle has been seen in Japan.

== Demographics ==
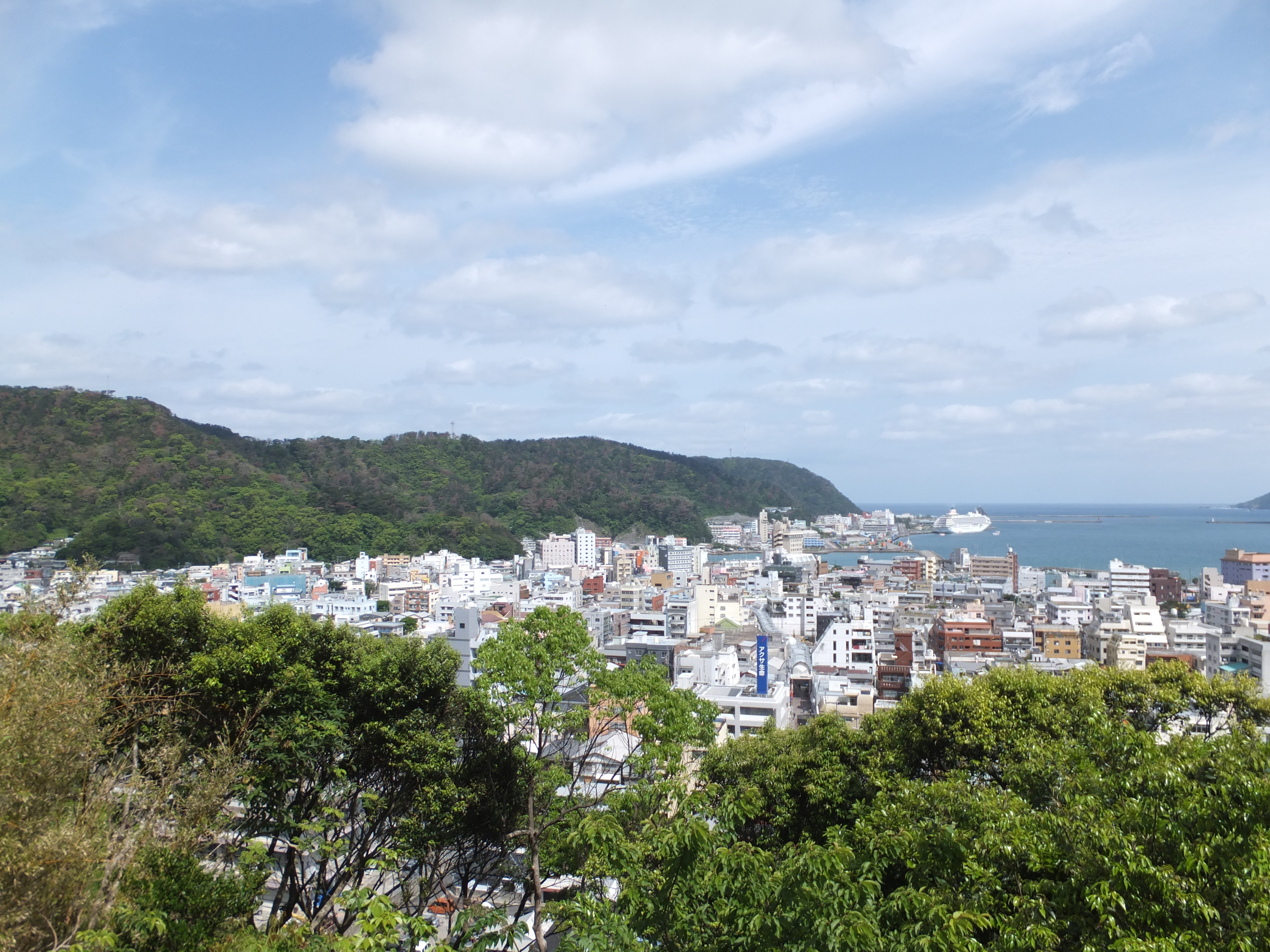
Skyline of Amami city

Amami Oshima had a population of 73,000 people in 2013. 44,561 people live in the city of Amami. The total area of Amami city is 308.15 km^{2} with a population density of 145 persons per km^{2}.

== Economy ==
The economy of Amami Ōshima is based on agriculture (sugar cane, rice and sweet potatoes), commercial fishing, and the distillation of shōchū. The favorable climate allows for two rice crops a year. Seasonal tourism is also an important part of the economy.

Traditional crafts on the island include the production of high quality hand-crafted silk called Ōshima-tsumugi which is mainly used to make kimono. Along with Persian carpets and Gobelin tapestries, is said to be one of the world's three great textiles. Ōshima-tsumugi is dyed with mud to create their characteristic black color.

== Transportation ==
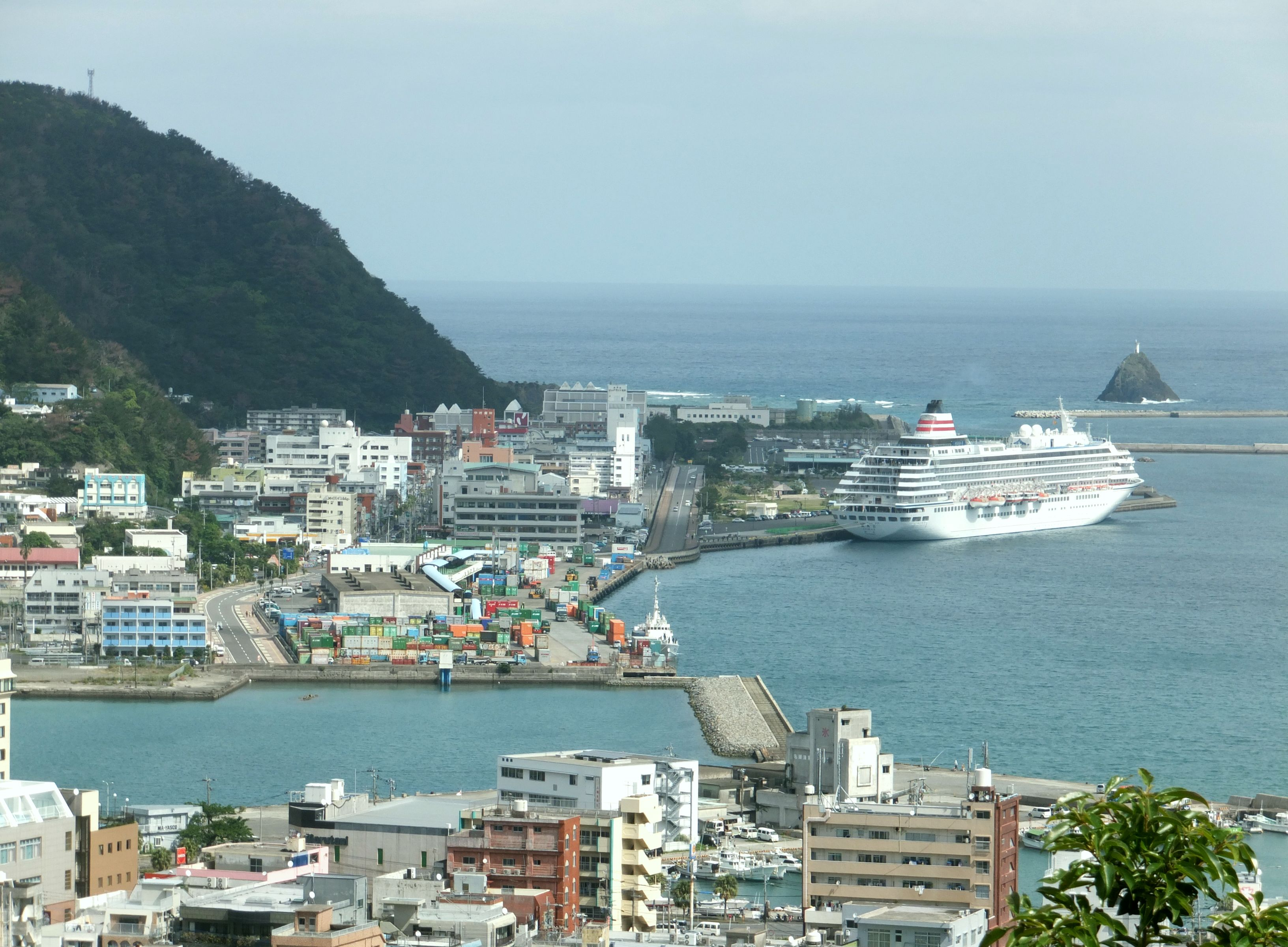
Naze port on Amami Ōshima

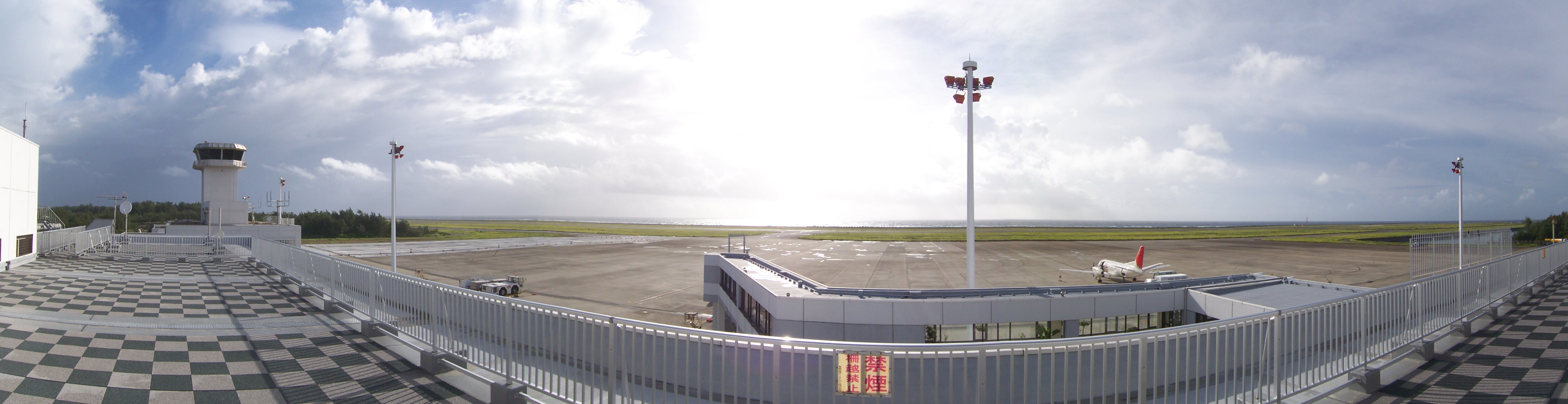
View of the Amami Airport runway

The port of Naze, located in the city of Amami is a major regional shipping and ferry hub.

Amami Airport, located at the northern end of the island, is connected to Tokyo, Osaka, Naha, Fukuoka and Kagoshima as well as local flights to the other Amami Islands. There are bus routes and roads on the island.

== Language ==
Two dialects of the Amami language are spoken in Amami Ōshima: the Northern Ōshima dialect and the Southern Ōshima dialect. These dialects are part of the Ryukyuan languages group. According to Ethnologue, as of 2005 there were about 10,000 speakers of the Northern Ōshima dialect and about 1,800 speakers of the Southern Ōshima dialect. These dialects are now spoken mostly by older residents of the island, while most of the younger generations are monolingual in Japanese. The Amami language, including the Ōshima dialects, is classified as endangered by UNESCO.

There is also a village sign language, named as Amami Oshima Sign Language, being used in the area.

== Notable people from Amami Ōshima ==
- Ikue Asazaki – Singer
- Kousuke Atari – Singer
- Meisei Chikara – Sumo wrestler
- Daiamami Genki – Sumo wrestler
- Chitose Hajime – Singer
- Minami Kizuki – Singer
- Motoji Koumei – Kimono retailer
- Kenji Midori – Karateka
- Domingos Chohachi Nakamura – Catholic missionary, who was born in Nagasaki and lived 26 years in Amami Oshima
- Reona – Singer
- Rikki – Singer
- Rena Takeshita – Fashion model

== See also ==
- Amami Guntō National Park
- Battle of Amami-Ōshima
