= List of historic sites of Japan (Kagoshima) =

This list is of the historic sites of Japan located within the Prefecture of Kagoshima.

== National Historic Sites ==
As of 19 June 2026, thirty-six Sites have been designated as being of national significance.

Site	Municipality	Comments	Image	Coordinates	Type	Ref.
Ushuku Shell Mound 宇宿貝塚 Ushuku kaizuka	Amami			28°27′09″N 129°42′49″E	1	3004
Yokose Kofun 横瀬古墳 Yokose kofun	Ōsaki	Kofun period tumulus	Yokose kofun	31°24′48″N 131°00′54″E	1	2993
Former Shūseikan 旧集成館附寺山炭窯跡関吉の疎水溝 kyū-Shūseikan tsuketari Terayama sumigama ato Sekiyoshi no sosuikō	Kagoshima	Bakumatsu to early Meiji industrial site; inscribed on the UNESCO World Heritage List as one of the Sites of Japan’s Meiji Industrial Revolution: Iron and Steel, Shipbuilding and Coal Mining	Shōko Shūseikan	31°37′02″N 130°34′35″E	6	2999
Grave of Keian 桂菴墓 Keian no haka	Kagoshima	Muromachi period Neo-Confucian scholar and Zen priest	Grave of Keian	31°37′14″N 130°31′39″E	7	2987
Hirota Site 広田遺跡 Hirota iseki	Minamitane	Yayoi period cemetery	Hirota iseki	30°25′30″N 130°58′02″E	1	00003581
Kōyama Castle ruins 高山城跡 Kōyama-jō ato	Kimotsuki	Castle ruins from late Heian to Sengoku period	Kōyama-jō ato	31°19′03″N 130°57′56″E	2	2997
Sata physic gardens site 佐多旧薬園 Sata kyū-yakuen	Minamiōsumi	Edo Period medicinal herb garden	Sata kyū-yakuen	31°05′31″N 130°41′28″E	5	2985
Satsuma Kokubun-ji ruins 薩摩国分寺跡 Satsuma Kokubunji ato	Satsumasendai	ruins of Nara period provincial temple of Satsuma Province	Satsuma Kokubunji ruins	31°49′55″N 130°18′24″E	3	2994
Shibushi Castle ruins 志布志城跡 Shibushi-jō ato	Shibushi	Castle ruins from late Heian to Sengoku period	Shibushi-jō ato	31°29′05″N 131°06′31″E	2	00003460
Ibusuki Hashimuregawa Site 指宿橋牟礼川遺跡 Ibusuki Hashimuregawa iseki	Ibusuki	Jomon to Yayoi Period settlement traces	Ibusuki Hashimuregawa site	31°13′45″N 130°38′42″E	1	2981
Kagoshima Spinning Mill site 鹿児島紡績所跡 Kagoshima bōsekijo ato	Kagoshima	Bakumatsu to Meiji period industrial site; inscribed on the UNESCO World Heritage List as one of the Sites of Japan’s Meiji Industrial Revolution: Iron and Steel, Shipbuilding and Coal Mining	Kagoshima Spinning Mill site	31°36′56″N 130°34′27″E	6	3000
Sumiyoshi Shell Mound 住吉貝塚 Sumiyoshi kaizuka	China			27°21′30″N 128°31′43″E	1	00003543
Kominato Fuwaganeku Site 小湊フワガネク遺跡 Kominatsu Fuwaganeku iseki	Amami		Kominato Fuwaganeku Site	28°19′26″N 129°31′50″E	1	00003686
Uenohara Site 上野原遺跡 Uenohara iseki	Kirishima	Yayoi Period settlement ruins	Uenohara iseki	31°42′51″N 130°48′02″E	1	3228
Kiyoshiki Castle ruins 清色城跡 Kiyoshiki-jō ato	Satsumasendai	Muromachi to Sengoku period castle ruins		31°48′22″N 130°25′33″E	2	3411
Akagina Castle Site 赤木名城跡 Akagina-jō ato	Amami	overlooking Kasari Bay at the east end of Amami Ōshima	Akagina Castle Site	28°27′13″N 129°40′50″E	2	00003627
Ōsumi Kokubun-ji and Miyatagaoka Tile Kiln ruins 大隅国分寺跡附宮田ヶ岡瓦窯跡 Ōsumi Kokubunji ato tsuketari Miyatagaoka kawara kama ato	Kirishima, Aira	Nara period provincial temple for Ōsumi Province and associated roof tile kilns	Ōsumi Kokubunji ato tsuketari Miyatagaoka kawara kama ato	31°44′28″N 130°46′17″E	3	2971
Ōkuchisuji-Shirakanezaka-Tatsumonjizaka 大口筋 白銀坂 龍門司坂 Ōkuchisuji-Shirakanezaka-Tatsumonjizaka	Kagoshima, Aira	traces of Sengoku to Edo Period road network	Ōkuchisuji-Shirakanezaka-Tatsumonjizaka	31°45′24″N 130°40′00″E	6	00003507
Chiran Castle ruins 知覧城跡 Chiran-jō ato	Minamikyūshū	Muromachi to Sengoku period castle ruins	Chiran Castle ruins	31°22′00″N 130°26′35″E	2	3005
Tsukazaki Kofun Cluster 塚崎古墳群 Tsukasaki kofun-gun	Kimotsuki	Kofun period tumulus cluster	Tsukasaki kofun-gun	31°20′26″N 130°58′07″E	1	2996
Tōjin Kofun Cluster 唐仁古墳群 Tōjin kofun-gun	Higashikushira	Kofun period tumulus cluster	Tōjin kofun-gun	31°21′46″N 130°59′05″E	1	2986
Tokunoshima Kamuiyaki Kiln Site 徳之島カムィヤキ陶器窯跡 Tokunoshima Kamuiyaki tōki kamaato	Isen		Tokunoshima Kamui-yaki Kiln Site	27°41′44″N 128°56′33″E	6	00003518
Grave of Nanpō Bunshi 南浦文之墓 Nanbo Bunshi no haka	Aira	Sengoku to Edo Period Neo-Confucian scholar and author		31°44′55″N 130°40′10″E	7	2988
Hayatozuka 隼人塚 Hayatozuka	Kirishima	Buddhist monument of uncertain origin	Hayatozuka	31°44′26″N 130°44′13″E	3	2970
Kakoinohara Site 栫ノ原遺跡 Kakoinohara iseki	Minamisatsuma	Jomon period settlement traces		31°25′18″N 130°19′51″E	1	3006
Ōsumi Shō-Hachimangū Precincts 大隅正八幡宮境内及び社家跡 Ōsumi Shō-Hachimangū keidai oyobi shake ato	Kirishima	Shinto shrine, ichinomiya of Osumi Province	Ōsumi Shō-Hachimangū Precincts	31°45′13″N 130°44′16″E	3	00003825
Omonawa Shell Mound 面縄貝塚 Omonawa kaizuka	Isen			27°40′26″N 128°57′55″E	1	00003972
Gusuku Site 城久遺跡 Gusuku iseki	Kikai		Gusuku Site	28°18′33″N 129°57′53″E	1,6	00003999
Kagoshima Shimazu Clan graves 鹿児島島津家墓所 Kagoshima Shimazu-ke bosho	Aira, Ibusuki, Kagoshima, Satsuma, Tarumizu	Daimyo graveyards	Kagoshima Shimazu Clan graves	31°36′41″N 130°33′41″E	7	00004103
Tachikiri Site - Yokomine Site 立切遺跡・横峯遺跡 Tachikiri iseki・Yokomine iseki	Nakatane, Minamitane	Japanese Palaeolithic sites	Tachikiri Site - Yokomine Site	30°26′36″N 130°52′25″E	3	00004170
Amami Ōshima Fortifications ruins 奄美大島要塞跡 Amami Ōshima yōsai ato	Setouchi	Taisho-Showa period coastal defences	Amami Ōshima Fortifications ruins	28°09′07″N 129°18′43″E	2	00004177
Kagoshima Castle ruins 鹿児島城跡 Kagoshima-jō ato	Kagoshima	Edo Period Japanese castle ruins	Kagoshima Castle ruins	31°35′55″N 130°33′17″E	2	00004178
Yoron Castle ruins 与論城跡 Yoron-jō ato	Yoron			27°01′40″N 128°25′46″E	2	00004223
Okinoerabujima Old Tombs 沖永良部島古墓群 Okinoerabu-jima kobo-gun	Wadomari, China			27°23′00″N 128°36′44″E	7	00004247
Izumi Castle Site 出水城跡; Izumi-jō ato	Izumi			32°04′12″N 130°21′34″E		
Ata Shell Mound Site 阿多貝塚; Ata kaizuka	Minamisatsuma			31°26′56″N 130°19′58″E		

== Prefectural Historic Sites ==
As of 1 May 2026, fifty-two Sites have been designated as being of prefectural importance.

Site	Municipality	Comments	Image	Coordinates	Type	Ref.
Yayoi Dwelling Site 弥生式住居跡; Yayoi-shiki jūkyo ato	Kagoshima	in the grounds of Kagoshima Ichinomiya Jinja (一之宮神社)		31°33′47″N 130°32′47″E		
Jōraku-in 常楽院; Jōrakuin	Hioki			31°31′37″N 130°21′02″E		
Yamakawa Yaku-en Site and Longan 山川薬園跡及びリュウガン; Yamakawa yakuen ato oyobi ryūgan	Ibusuki			31°12′17″N 130°38′21″E		
Roku Jizō Tō 六地蔵塔; Roku Jizō tō	Minamisatsuma			31°24′40″N 130°19′04″E		
Ichijō-in Site 一乗院跡; Ichijō-in ato	Minamisatsuma			31°16′16″N 130°13′52″E		
Hirata Yukie Residence Site 平田靱負屋敷跡; Hirata Yukie yashiki ato	Kagoshima			31°35′29″N 130°32′46″E		
Nanshū Grave Site 南洲墓地; Nanshū bochi	Kagoshima	at Jōkōmyō-ji (浄光明寺)		31°36′21″N 130°33′33″E		
Nanshū Rutaku Site 南洲流謫跡; Nanshū Rutaku ato	Tatsugō			28°27′04″N 129°36′14″E		
Kamemaru Castle Site 亀丸城; Kamemaru-jō ato	Hioki			31°30′23″N 130°21′54″E		
Kiyomizu Stone Buddhas 清水磨崖仏; Kiyomizu magai-butsu	Minamikyūshū			31°25′02″N 130°25′18″E		
Tomari Jochiku Grave 泊如竹の墓; Tomari Jochiku no haka	Yakushima			30°18′49″N 130°39′21″E		
Aikō Kishun Grave 愛甲喜春の墓; Aikō Kishun no haka	Shibushi			31°28′32″N 131°06′02″E		
Kōriyama Kawada Dōzono Memorial Tō 郡山町川田堂園の供養塔群; Kōriyama-chō Kawada Dōzono no kuyōtō-gun	Kagoshima			31°40′34″N 130°30′19″E		
Sasue Kofun 指江古墳; Sasue kofun	Nagashima			32°09′10″N 130°06′58″E		
Kurino Inobazaki Memorial Towers 栗野町稲葉崎の供養塔群; Kurino-chō Inobazaki no kuyōtō-gun	Aira			31°58′03″N 130°41′33″E		
Kurino Taobaru Memorial Towers 栗野町田尾原の供養塔群; Kurino-chō Taobaru no kuyōtō-gun	Aira			31°57′58″N 130°42′00″E		
Raigō-ji Site Graves 来迎寺跡墓塔群; Raigōji ato haka-tō-gun	Ichikikushikino			31°28′52″N 131°06′35″E		
Hōman-ji Site 宝満寺跡; Hōmanji ato	Shibushi			31°28′52″N 131°06′35″E		
Ryūmonji-yaki Old Kiln 竜門司焼古窯; Ryūmonji-yaki Old Kiln	Aira			31°46′00″N 130°40′18″E		
Shigakkō Site Stone Walls 私学校跡石塀; Shigakkō ato ishibei	Kagoshima			31°35′45″N 130°33′16″E		
Nejime Kawaminami Uto Stele 根占町川南宇都の板碑; Nejime-chō Kawaminami Uto no itabi	Minamiōsumi			31°12′50″N 130°46′48″E		
Satsuma Nagano Beppuhara Kofun Cluster 薩摩町永野別府原古墳群; Satsuma Nagano Beppuhara kofun-gun	Satsuma			31°55′41″N 130°33′21″E		
Wakimoto Kofun Cluster 脇本古墳群糸割渕1号墳・2号墳; Wakimoto kofun-gun Itowarifuchi ichigō-fun nigō-fun	Akune			32°04′53″N 130°12′19″E		
Akamizu no Iwadō Stone Buddhas 赤水の岩堂磨崖仏; Akamizu no Iwadō magaibutsu	Kirishima			31°50′37″N 130°43′56″E		
Kasanohara Tsuchimochi Wells 笠野原土持堀の深井戸; Kasanohara Tsuchimochi hori no fuka ido	Kanoya			31°26′14″N 130°54′08″E		
Ohamazaki Kofun Cluster 小浜崎古墳群; Ohamazaki kofun-gun	Nagashima			32°10′30″N 130°06′04″E		
Myōjin Kofun Cluster 明神古墳群; Myōjin kofun-gun	Nagashima			32°10′41″N 130°06′00″E		
Kasedō Kofun 加世堂古墳; Kasedō kofun	Nagashima			32°08′00″N 130°10′32″E		
Tamaki Swordsmith Family Graves 刀匠玉置家歴代の墓 tōshō Tamaki-ke rekidai no haka	Kagoshima			31°22′09″N 130°31′46″E		
Daigan-ji Site Graves and Pagodas 鶴田町大願寺跡墓塔群(開山堂跡・薬師堂跡); Tsuruta-chō Daiganji ato haka-tō-gun (Kaisandō ato Yakushidō ato)	Satsuma	designation includes the sites of the Kaisandō and Yakushidō		31°55′33″N 130°27′43″E		
Inutabu Shell Mound 犬田布貝塚; Inutabu kaizuka	Isen			27°42′43″N 128°54′05″E		
Shiroma Tofuru Tombs 城間トフル墓群; Shiroma Tofuru haka-gun	Amami			28°26′51″N 129°42′34″E		
Ichiki Shell Mound 市来町市来貝塚; Ichiki-chō Ichiki kaizuka	Ichikikushikino			31°42′28″N 130°18′47″E		
Atsuchi Matsuyama Iron Works Site 厚地松山製鉄遺跡; Atsuchi Matsuyama seitetsu iseki	Minamikyūshū			31°24′08″N 130°27′16″E		
Uto Kiln Site 宇都窯跡; Uto gama ato	Aira			31°44′51″N 130°37′36″E		
Kurokawa Cave 黒川洞穴; Kurokawa dōketsu	Hioki			31°33′10″N 130°24′07″E		
Ei Castle Site 頴娃城跡; Ei-jō ato	Minamikyūshū			31°13′33″N 130°31′29″E		
Miyama Satsuma Ware Kiln 美山薩摩焼窯; Miyama Satsuma-yaki gama	Hioki			31°38′31″N 130°21′29″E		
Kenshō Castle Site 建昌城跡; Kenshō-jō ato	Aira			31°43′48″N 130°36′45″E		
Amatatsutera-mae Kofun 天辰寺前古墳; Amatatsutera-mae kofun	Satsumasendai			31°49′40″N 130°19′13″E		
Okazaki Kofun Cluster 岡崎古墳群; Okazaki kofun-gun	Kagoshima			31°22′52″N 130°57′31″E		
Okano Kiln Sites 岡野窯跡群; Okano kama ato-gun	Isa					
Kakehashizaka 掛橋坂; Kakehashizaka	Aira			31°47′06″N 130°32′55″E		
Kanayama Waterwheel Site 金山水車(轟製錬所)跡; Kanayama suisha (todoroki seirenjo) ato	Minamikyūshū			31°22′13″N 130°25′08″E		
Tomori Petroglyphs 戸森の線刻画; Tomori no senkokuga	Amagi			27°46′09″N 128°55′15″E		
Nejimehara Battery Site 根占原台場跡; Nejimehara daiba ato	Minamiōsumi			31°10′26″N 130°45′46″E		
Nakafu Cave 中甫洞穴; Nakafu dōketsu	China			27°22′42″N 128°35′54″E		
Satsuma Rebellion Takakumayama Battlefield 西南戦争 高熊山古戦場; Seinan-sensō Takakumayama kosenjō	Isa			32°06′36″N 130°39′00″E		
Tomachin Site トマチン遺跡; Tomachin iseki	Isen			27°40′31″N 128°59′20″E		
Gionnosu Battery Site 祇園之洲台場跡; Gionnosu daiba ato	Kagoshima			31°36′17″N 130°34′11″E		
Harada Kofun 原田古墳; Harada kofun	Shibushi			31°27′43″N 131°00′00″E		
Tenpozan Battery Site 天保山台場跡; Tenpozan daiba ato	Kagoshima			31°34′22″N 130°33′52″E		

== Municipal Historic Sites ==
As of 1 May 2025, a further six hundred and eighty-two Sites have been designated as being of municipal importance.

== See also ==
- Cultural Properties of Japan
- List of Places of Scenic Beauty of Japan (Kagoshima)
- List of Cultural Properties of Japan - paintings (Kagoshima)
- Reimeikan, Kagoshima Prefectural Center for Historical Material
