= Yokomine Site =

Archaeological site in Minamitane, Japan

- 横峯遺跡 (Japanese)
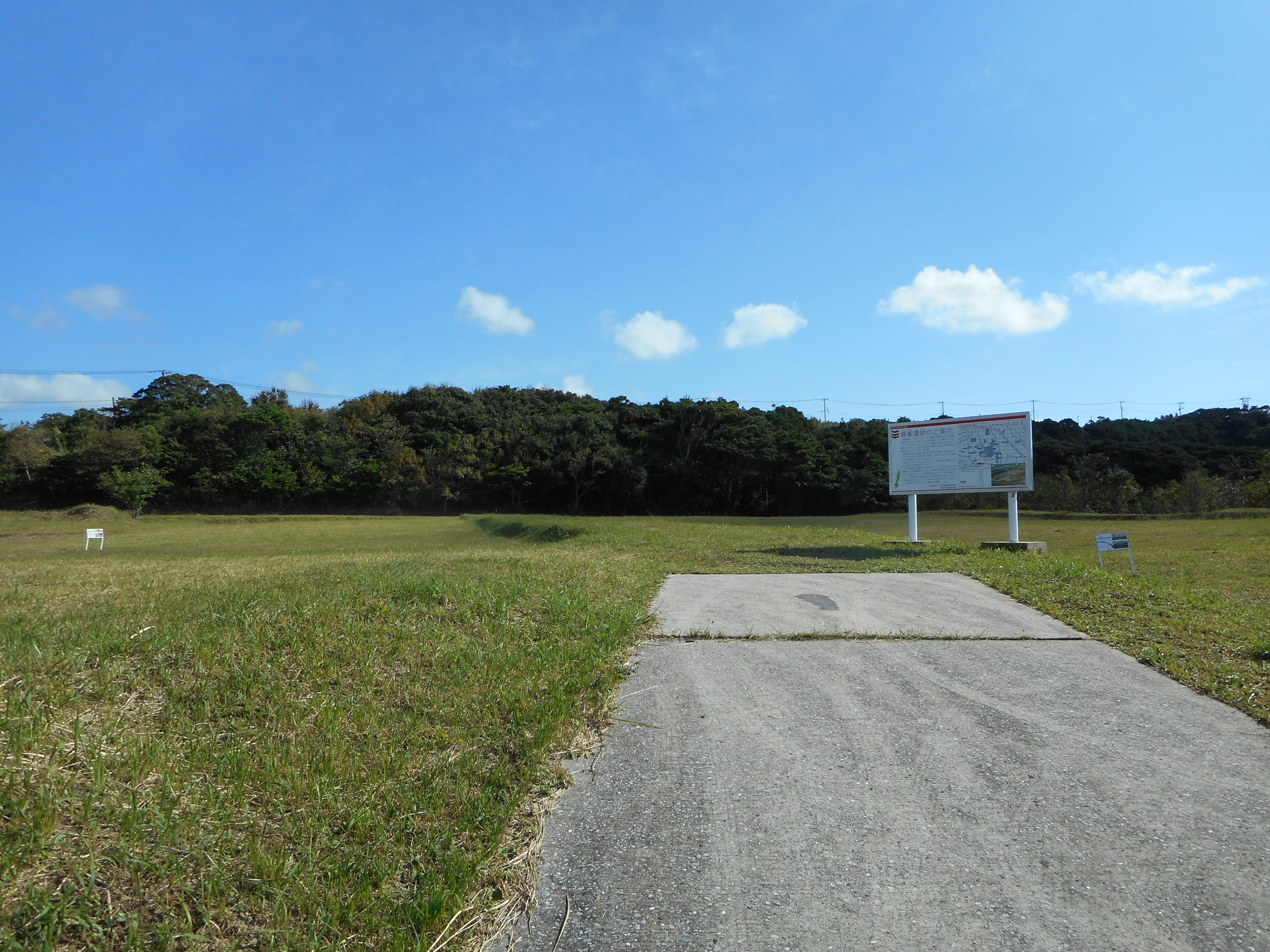
- Yokomine Site

- Yokomine Site Yokomine Site (Japan)
- Interactive map of Yokomine Site
- 30°26′35.9″N 130°52′24.8″E
- Periods: Japanese Paleolithic
- Location: Minamitane, Kagoshima, Japan
- Region: Kyushu

Site notes
- Public access: Yes (museum)

The Yomomine Site (横峯遺跡) is an archaeological site with traces of a late Japanese Paleolithic period, located in the town of Minamitane, Kagoshima Prefecture, Japan, on the island of Tanegashima. The site was designated a National Historic Site of Japan in 2003, and subsequently the designation was expanded to include the nearby Tachikiri Site in 2022.

== Overview ==
The Yokomine Site is the first Paleolithic site discovered on Tanegashima. During excavations in 1992, and traces of human habitation from the Paleolithic through the Jōmon period was discovered, including the oldest cooking site remains yet found in Japan, in the soil layer dating back approximately 30,000 years per radiocarbon dating. Two pieces of stone tools were also excavated. The site is located on a plateau about 120 meters above sea level, about two kilometers inland from the west coast of the island. In an upper level of the strata, dating to approximately 6,300 years ago, five stone collection structures from the early Jōmon period were found, along with shards of Jōmon pottery

The Tachikiri Site is located in the town of Nakatane, Kagoshima, also at an elevation of approximately 120 feet. During a prefectural farm road network improvement project in 1997, remains were found in the lower strata of the Tanede IV volcanic ash layer (30,900 years ago), which originated from the Kikakai caldera (located on the ocean floor west of Tanegashima). Approximately 50 stone tools from the early Paleolithic period were unearthed. These tools were from a period of transition from the Middle Paleolithic to the Upper Paleolithic, in which the form of stone tools changed significantly. The remains also included eight earthen pits/fire pits (remains of burned clay) and two gravel groups (remains of steamed cooking), which are presumed to be prehistoric storage pits, as well as five posthole-shaped pits.

== See also ==
- List of Historic Sites of Japan (Kagoshima)
