= Hirota Site =

Archaeological site in Minamitane, Japan

- 広田遺跡 (Japanese)
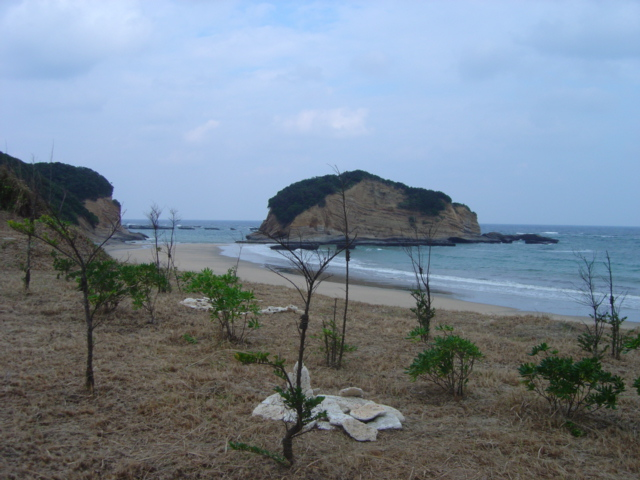
- Hirota Site

- Hirota Site Hirota Site (Japan)
- Interactive map of Hirota Site
- 30°25′29.5″N 130°58′2.2″E
- Type: cemetery
- Periods: Yayoi- Kofun period
- Location: Minamitane, Kagoshima, Japan
- Region: Kyushu

History
- Built: c.2nd - 7th century

Site notes
- Public access: Yes (museum)

The Hirota Site (広田遺跡) is an archaeological site with the remains of a late Yayoi Period to late Kofun period cemetery, located in the town of Minamitane, Kagoshima Prefecture, Japan, and teb island of Tanegashima. The site was designated a National Historic Site of Japan in 2008.

== Overview ==
The Hirota Site was discovered in 1955, when human bones and shell products were found in a sand dune facing the Pacific Ocean that collapsed due to a typhoon. Archaeological excavations were carried out two years later, and it was discovered that the ruins date from the late Yayoi period to the late Kofun period. The initial investigation covered an area of approximately 230 square meters, finding human remains from 157 bodies in 90 places, including earthen pit graves, stone graves, and graves where multiple human bones were reburied in groups, including joint burials. As many as 44,000 pieces of shellfish products were buried as grave goods, and this huge collection of shellfish products included "shellfish notes" in which small shell plates were inscribed unique patterns. The materials used include Sinustrombus latissimus, and Conidae, and other shells not native to the area, but which were imported from the southern seas.

The upper layer retains traces of bone reburial and is accompanied by late Yayoi pottery. Many shell products with patterns engraved on them were interred with these reinterred human bones. In the lower layer, many remains were buried supine or crooked, accompanied by pottery dating from the end of the early Yayoi period to the beginning of the middle Yayoi period. Some of the remains in the lower layer were buried wearing shell bracelets, and many were also adorned with shell badges carved with intricate patterns, shell products made in the shape of dragons, and small shell beads. The pattern on the shellfish is very similar to that of bone products excavated from late Jōmon period ruins on the main island of Okinawa and Amami Oshima, so it can be assumed that the culture spread northward along the island chain. The custom of reburying the bones of the upper layer is also thought to have been introduced from the south, and some theories have suggested that their origins lie in the culture of the Jiangnan region of China.

As a result of examining the buried human bones, it was found that the average height of the Hirota people was only about 154 cm for adult men and 143 cm for women, compared to the Yayoi people of northern Kyushu who lived at the same time (adult men averaged about 163 cm, and women averaged about 143 cm). It was also discovered that they have unique customs such as having only one lateral incisor removed from the upper jaw and making the back of the head flat.

In 2003, Ichiki-style pottery and Issou-style pottery from the late Jōmon period were discovered on a slight hill just behind the sand dunes where the cemetery ruins was located. In 2005, new cemetery ruins were discovered on the west and north sides of the site.

In 2006, the excavated items were designated as National Important Cultural Properties, and in 2009, the excavated items in the possession of the town were added to the designation.

The site is approximately 20 minutes by car from Tanegashima Airport or approximately one hour by car from Nishinoomote Port. The Hirota Ruins Museum opened on March 1, 2015, adjacent to the site.

== See also ==
- List of Historic Sites of Japan (Kagoshima)
