= Shimama =

Shimama may refer to

- Shimama Village (島間村), a former Japanese village merged in 1889 with Kukinaga Village to form Minamitane, Kagoshima
- Pokémon Number 522, known in Japanese as Shimama and in English as Blitzle
