= Ushuku Shell Mound =

Archaeological site in China, Kagoshima, Japan

Coordinates: 28°27′09″N 129°42′49″E

- 宇宿貝塚 (Japanese)
- Ushuku Shell Mound Ushuku Shell Mound (Japan)
- Interactive map of Ushuku Shell Mound
- Type: shell midden
- Periods: late Jōmon - Yayoi period
- Location: Amami, Kagoshima, Japan
- Region: Kyushu

Site notes
- Public access: Yes (museum)

The Ushuku Shell Mound (宇宿貝塚, Ushuku kaizuka) is an archaeological site in the Kasari-cho neighborhood of the city of Amami, Kagoshima on the island of Amami Ōshima, Japan. The midden was designated a National Historic Site of Japan in 1986.

== Overview ==
During the Jōmon period, sea levels were five to six meters higher than at present, and the ambient temperature was also two deg C higher. During this period, the Jōmon people often lived in coastal settlements, with a hunter-gatherer culture. These middens associated with such settlements contain bone, botanical material, mollusc shells, sherds, lithics, and other artifacts and ecofacts associated with the now-vanished inhabitants, and these features, provide a useful source into the diets and habits of Jōmon society. Most of these middens are found along the Pacific coast of Japan.

The Ushuku Shell Midden is located on an inland sand dune at an elevation of about 13 meters on the northern tip of Amami Ōshima. It is a complex site with stratification and eight cultural layers have been discovered during excavations, dating from the middle Jōmon period to the Kamakura period. Late Yayoi pottery from various of the Ryukyu Islands were discovered together in the top 3-4 layers. In the lower 6th and 7th layers, Katoku-type pottery excavated from the Katoku Site (Setouchi, Kagoshima), Omonawa-type pottery excavated from the Omonawa Shell Mound (Isen, Kagoshima), as well as Ichiki-type pottery from the late Jōmon period from the Ichiki Shell Mound (Ichikikushikino, Kagoshima) on the Kyushu mainland, were discovered.

Settlement traces confirmed include a stone collection site, the remains of a stone-built dwelling from the late Jōmon period, and a pit from the Yayoi period. In the pit, the bones of a woman estimated to be 20 to 25 years old and an infant's bones were found, indicating a mother and child had been buried together. Pebbles, small polished stone tools, glass beads, and tubular bone beads were also excavated from the pit.

Currently, the site is maintained as Usukigai Historical Site Park, and is It is about three minutes by car from Amami Airport.

== See also ==
- List of Historic Sites of Japan (Kagoshima)
