= Gusuku Site =

Gusuku Archaeological Sites
- 城久遺跡 (Japanese)
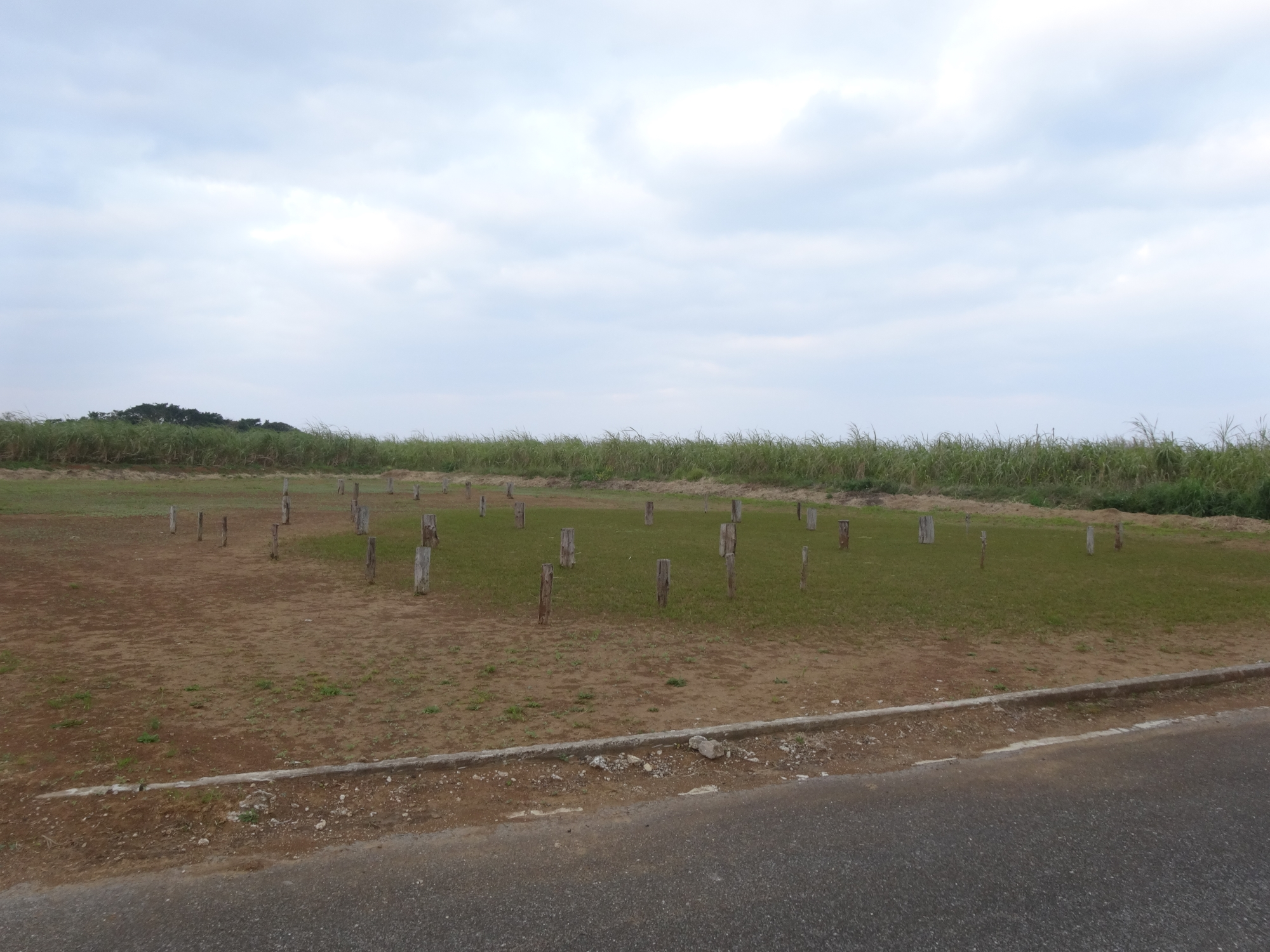
- Yamada Hanta Site

- Gusuku Archaeological Sites Gusuku Site (Japan)
- Interactive map of Gusuku Archaeological Sites
- 28°18′33″N 129°57′53″E
- Type: Settlement trace
- Location: Kikai, Kagoshima, Japan
- Region: Kyushu

History
- Built: 9th-14th century century

Site notes
- Public access: Yes (no facilities)

The Gusuku Archaeological Sites (城久遺跡, Gusuku iseki) are a group of archaeological sites on the island of Kikaijima in the Amami Islands of Kagoshima Prefecture, dating from the Heian to Muromachi periods. It is a collective name for eight sites near the Gusuku neighborhood in the town of Kikai, Kagoshima. In 2017, it was designated a National Historic Site in 2017.

== Overview ==
The Gusuku Archaeological Sites include the Yamada Handa Site (山田半田遺跡), Handaguchi Site (半田口遺跡), Maehata Site (前畑遺跡), O-Ufu Site (大ウフ遺跡), Handa Site (半田遺跡), Yamada Nakanishi Site (山田中西遺跡), Kohane Site (小ハネ遺跡), and Akaren Site (赤連遺跡). Of these, only the first five are covered by the National Historic Site designation. Collectively, they form a large settlement site, of which archaeological excavations began in 2003.

Located on a hill in the central part of Kikaijima, the site's estimated age is divided into three periods: the 9th to early 10th centuries, the late 11th to mid-12th centuries, and the 13th to late 15th centuries. Hundreds of post-hole buildings, pit burials, and cremation tombs have been discovered. Investigations of 12th-13th century flexed burials suggest a burial style similar to that of medieval Buddhist burial practices on the Japanese mainland. Excavated artifacts include earthenware similar to those unearthed in Dazaifu, as well as Chinese and Korean ceramics such as Yue ware celadon, Korean unglazed pottery, and early Goryeo celadon. Recent investigations have also uncovered numerous 12th-century iron smelting furnace traces.The island appears to have been the center of trade network, introducing the technology to produce Kamui ware on neighboring Tokunoshima from the Korean Peninsula and exporting that ceramics, along with luminous shells, to Hakata in Kyushu. Ceramics from China and the Korean Peninsula, Song dynasty coins, and copper objects along with ash-glazed ceramic bowls from Mino Province indicates the widespread scale of trade.

According to the Nihon Kiryaku, in the 4th year of Chōtoku (998), Dazaifu ordered Kikaijima to subdue the unruly "Nanban" (Southern Barbarians, possibly Amami Oshima people), whose raids had been plaguing the coastal settlements of western Kyushu. This suggests that Kikaijima was under the control of Dazaifu had a significant garrison or naval force. This corresponds to the first period of the site.

However, from the late Heian period to the Kamakura period, Kikaijima was called Kikai-koku, and the Azuma Kagami states that it was not under the control of the imperial court and that it was questionable whether it was part of Japan, suggesting that Kikaijima was independent at that time.

The estimated later period of the ruins coincides with the establishment of the Ryukyu Kingdom, beginning with the Three Kingdoms period on Okinawa Island. While Shō Toku of the First Shō Dynasty conquered Kikaijima in 1466, it is unclear whether this directly relates to the end of the settlement.

== See also ==
- List of Historic Sites of Japan (Kagoshima)
