= Sumiyoshi Shell Mound =

Archaeological site in China, Kagoshima, Japan

Sumiyoshi Shell Midden
- 住吉貝塚 (Japanese)
- Sumiyoshi Shell Midden Sumiyoshi Shell Mound (Japan)
- Interactive map of Sumiyoshi Shell Midden
- 27°21′30″N 128°31′43″E
- Type: shell midden
- Periods: late Jōmon - Yayoi period
- Location: China, Kagoshima, Japan
- Region: Kyushu

Site notes
- Public access: Yes (no facilities)

The Sumiyoshi Shell Midden (住吉貝塚, Sumiyoshi kaizuka) is an archaeological site in the town of China, Kagoshima on the island of Okinoerabujima, Japan. The midden was designated a National Historic Site of Japan in 2007.

== Overview ==
During the Jōmon period, sea levels were five to six meters higher than at present, and the ambient temperature was also two deg C higher. During this period, the Jōmon people often lived in coastal settlements, with a hunter-gatherer culture. These middens associated with such settlements contain bone, botanical material, mollusc shells, sherds, lithics, and other artifacts and ecofacts associated with the now-vanished inhabitants, and these features, provide a useful source into the diets and habits of Jōmon society. Most of these middens are found along the Pacific coast of Japan.

The Sumiyoshi Shell Midden is a settlement site with shell mounds dating from the latter half of the Late Jōmon period to the early Yayoi period, located on the west coast of Okinoerabu Island, between Amami Oshima and Okinawa Island in the Ryukyu Islands. The site is located on a gentle southwest-facing slope at an elevation of about 12 meters on a coastal cliff, with a valley to the north. On a clear day, Yoron Island can be seen to the south.

Discovered and excavated in 1957, and again from 2001 to 2005, the site is a famous in academic history, attracting attention for its pit dwellings, unique to the central Ryukyu cultural region, with walls made of Ryukyu limestone. The site extends for 120 meters from east-to-west and 100 meters from north-to-south. Excavations have uncovered traces of 14 pit dwellings, three prehistoric storage pits, and two shell mounds. In addition, small middens formed in depressions after the pit dwellings were abandoned and food waste was dumped in the depressions were found in all the pit dwellings. As all of the pit dwellings are in very good condition with almost no leveling, it has been possible to trace the process by which they changed from structures that were simply dug into the ground in the latter half of the Late Jōmon period to structures with stone walls in the early Yayoi period. It is estimated that there are about 50 pit dwellings in total, and another group of pit dwellings from around the same period has also been discovered at the Tomoru ruins, 200 meters north across the valley. The contents of the shell middens included grouper and parrotfish bones, and shellfish such as scallops. Wild boars overwhelmingly predominate among the animal bones, accounting for 70%, followed by whales, dolphins, and dogs. As for man-made remains, one piece of late Jōmon pottery from the Kyushu mainland has been found among a group of pottery unique to the Central Ryukyu Islands cultural region. The stone tools mainly consist of double-edged stone axes, small single-edged stone axes, and chipped stone axes, but an obsidian flake that had also been brought in from the Kyushu mainland was also found. The accessories include hairpins, pendants, and earplugs made from dugong, shark, and boar bones, shell rings and beads mainly from the giant oak, and pendants made from oyster-shell, making the majority of the items made from materials unique to the central Ryukyu cultural sphere.

Currently, the site has been backfilled for preservation purposes.

== See also ==
- List of Historic Sites of Japan (Kagoshima)
