= Kominato Fuwaganeku Site =

National Historic Site in Amami, Kagoshima Prefecture Japan

Kominatsu Fuwaganeku site
- 小湊フワガネク遺跡 (Japanese)
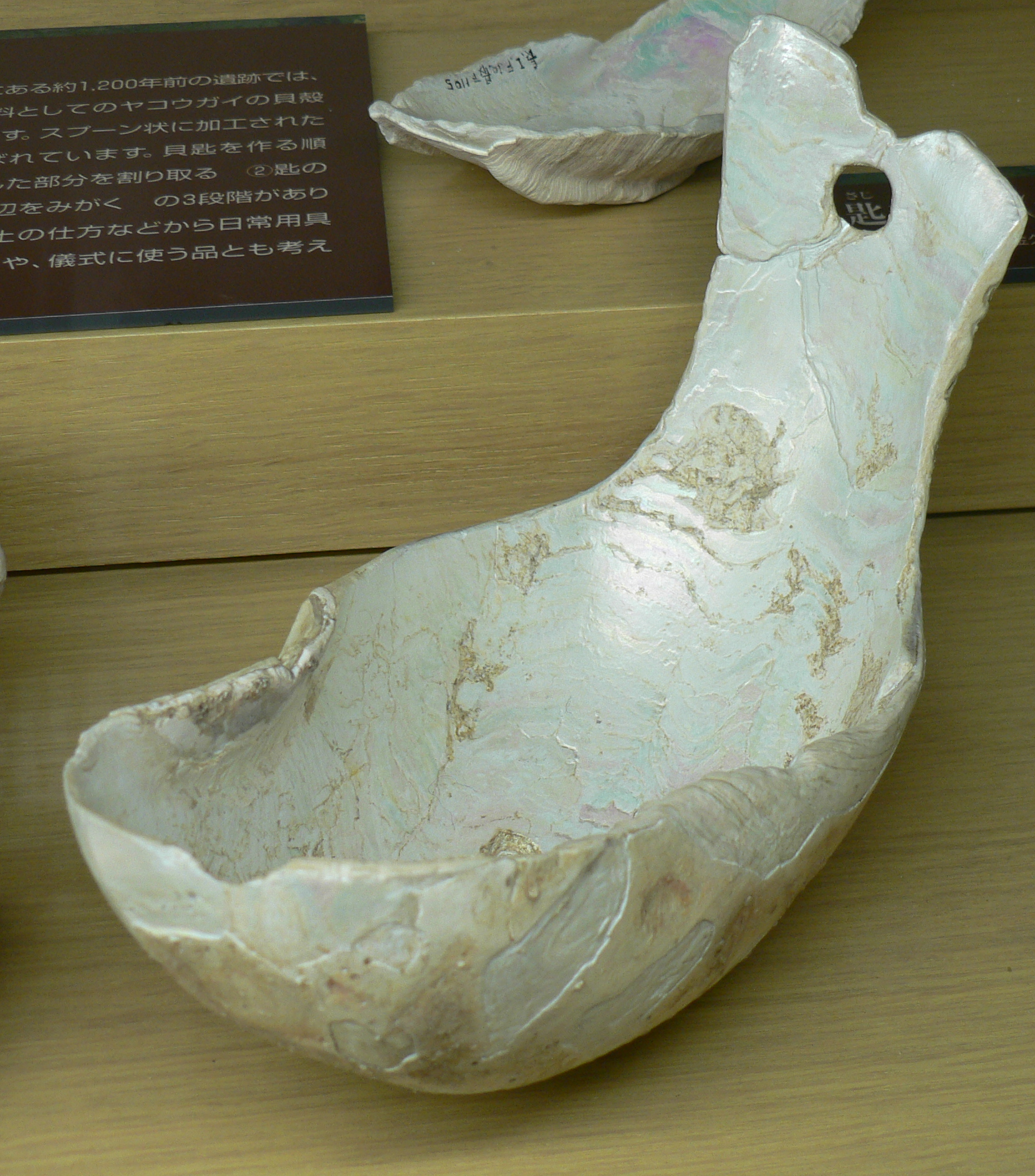
- Shell spoon from the Kominatsu Fuwaganeku site

- Kominatsu Fuwaganeku site Kominato Fuwaganeku Site (Japan)
- Interactive map of Kominatsu Fuwaganeku site
- 28°19′26″N 129°31′50″E
- Type: Settlement, industrial site
- Location: Amami, Kagoshima, Japan
- Region: Kyushu

The Kominatsu Fuwaganeku site (小湊フワガネク遺跡, Kominatsu Fuwaganeku iseki) is an archaeological site located in the Naze neighborhood of the city of Amami, Kagoshima Prefecture Japan. It was designated a National Historic Site of Japan in 2010.

== Overview ==
The Kominatsu Fuwaganeku site is located on a sand dune with an elevation of about 9 meters above sea level in the central part of Amami Ōshima island. It was discovered in 1997 during a survey conducted in conjunction with a plan to expand the adjacent Amami Nursing and Welfare College facilities, and excavations continued until 2002. As a result, four post-hole buildings with hearths in the center and one grave on the north side were confirmed, and the total area of the site was approximately 25,000 square meters.

In the 1997 excavation, the remains of four post-hole foundation buildings and five shell spoon manufacturing sites dating to the 7th century were discovered, as well as a large number of excavated artifacts, including 8000 pieces of Kanehisa-style pottery (unique to the Amami Islands), 3000 oyster shells, 90 oyster shell spoons, 16 cone shells, eight pieces of ironware, and approximately 3,000 stone tools. All four post-hole buildings were rectangular, with a common size of approximately 4 x 2 meters. Six sites of shell spoon production were confirmed, and contained completed spoons made from as well as spoons in the process of being made.In addition, many natural remains (shells, animal bones, etc.) that are thought to be food remains were also excavated. These artifacts were dated to the 6th to 8th centuries. The artifacts recovered from the site were collectively designated an Important Cultural Property in 2016.

The Kominatsu Fuwaganeku site is about a 44-minute drive from Naze Port.

== See also ==
- List of Historic Sites of Japan (Kagoshima)
