= Kiyoshiki Castle =

Castle ruins in Satsumasendai, Kagoshima, Japan

- 清色城
- Satsumasendai, Kagoshima Japan

Site information
- Type: Japanese castle
- Open to the public: yes
- Condition: Archaeological and designated national historical site; castle ruins

Location
- Coordinates: 31°48′22″N 130°25′33″E

Site history
- In use: Sengoku period
- National Historic Site of Japan

Kiyoshiki Castle (清色城, Kiyoshiki-jō) was a Muromachi to Sengoku period Japanese castle located in the Iriki neighborhood of the city of Satsumasendai, Kagoshima Prefecture, Japan. Its ruins have been protected as a National Historic Site since 2004.

== Overview ==
It is not certain when Kiyoshiki Castle was constructed, but it is believed to have been in the Kamakura period, shortly after a cadet branch of the Shibuya clan was relocated from Sagami Province to Satsuma Province in 1247. The clan took the name of Iriki-in and came also immediately into conflict with the Shimazu clan.

The Kiyoshiki Castle ruins are located on the left bank of the Kiyoiro River, at an elevation of about 100 meters, on the northeast jutting out part of the Shirasu Plateau that runs from west to east. The foothills village on the east side of the castle was the residence area of the Iriki-in clan and their vassals from the Muromachi period to the early modern period, and as the scenery from that time has been well preserved. This jōkamachi has been designated as an Important Preservation District for Groups of Traditional Buildings. It is estimated that the castle was built around the Eiwa era (1375–1379), and the remains are about 600 meters north-to-south and 750 meters east-to-west, with a kuruwa (enclosure) at the top of the ridge that runs from southwest-to-northeast. The main ridge faces northeast from the dry moat that bounds the southwest, and four branch ridges branch off from this ridge in the north direction to form a group of 16 independent baileys, the largest of which is about 5,000 square meters, each protected by dry moats. The Hiwaki River, which flows through the east, south, and north, also forms a natural moat. Some earthworks and tower platforms remain, and the foundations of compound gates have also been confirmed in nearly half of the baileys.

The castle was abandoned at the start of the Edo Period under the Tokugawa shogunate's restriction of "one castle per domain". The site is about 30 minutes by car from JR Kyushu Sendai Station.

== See also ==
- List of Historic Sites of Japan (Kagoshima)

== Literature ==
- Benesch, Oleg and Ran Zwigenberg (2019). Japan's Castles: Citadels of Modernity in War and Peace. Cambridge: Cambridge University Press. p. 374. ISBN 9781108481946.
- De Lange, William (2021). An Encyclopedia of Japanese Castles. Groningen: Toyo Press. pp. 600 pages. ISBN 978-9492722300.
