= Kagoshima Spinning Mill =

UNESCO World Heritage Site
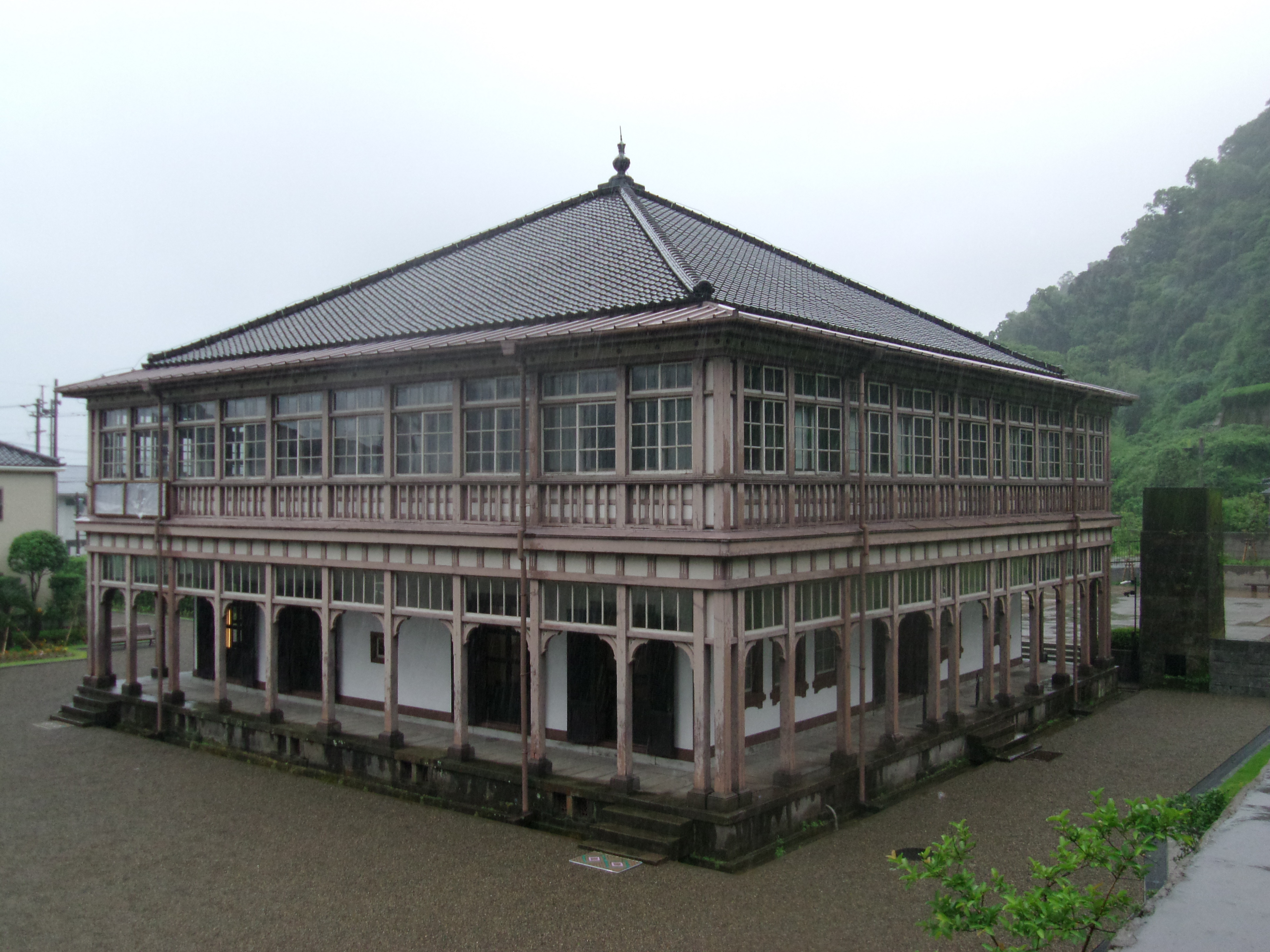
- Kagoshima bōsekijo gishikan (Ijinkan)

- Location within Kagoshima Prefecture Location within Japan
- Location: Kagoshima, Kagoshima, Japan
- Part of: Sites of Japan's Meiji Industrial Revolution: Iron and Steel, Shipbuilding and Coal Mining
- Criteria: Cultural: (ii), (iv)
- Reference: 1484
- Inscription: 2015 (39th Session)
- Coordinates: 31°36′56″N 130°34′27″E
- Important Cultural Property National Historic Site of Japan

Japan’s Meiji Industrial Revolution sites map Kagoshima

The Kagoshima Spinning Mill (鹿児島紡績所跡, Kagoshima bōsekijo ato) is a former cotton spinning mill constructed in the Bakumatsu period by Satsuma Domain in the Yoshino neighborhood of the city of Kagoshima Japan. The surviving residence for foreign engineers was designated a National Historic Site in 1959, and the site as a whole was later designated a component of the Sites of Japan's Meiji Industrial Revolution: Iron and Steel, Shipbuilding and Coal Mining, which received UNESCO World Heritage Site status in 2015.

== Overview ==
During the final years of the Tokugawa shogunate, Shimazu Nariakira, the daimyō of Satsuma Domain, was greatly interested in Dutch studies and convinced that Japan needed to industrialize and develop militarily and economically to avoid colonization by the Western powers. As a result, in 1857 he constructed the Shōko Shūseikan, the first Western-style factory in Japan, to create the materials needed for shipbuilding as well as products for exporting. Some 1,200 craftsmen worked at these factories every day, but after his death, operations were scaled back, and in 1863, almost everything except the reverberatory furnace was burned down during the Bombardment of Kagoshima.

His successor, Shimazu Tadayoshi, planned to rebuild Shōko Shūseikan and construct a Western-style textile mill, so sent 19 students to England in 1865. He purchased the necessary machinery through Godai Tomoatsu from the Platt Brothers, including more than 150 spinning machines, including cotton openers, carding machines, spindle spinning frames, and power looms, powered by a steam engine. The domain also invited seven British engineers to Kagoshima to install the machinery and provide operational guidance. These were the predecessors of the O-yatoi Gaikokujin who would later be employed by the Meiji government. Raw cotton was mainly purchased from the Kansai region, and over 200 workers spun 180 kg of cotton in a 10-hour day. In 1869, the mill produced 65,000 bolts of white cotton and 2,600 jin of kasuri cloth, which were sold mainly in the Kansai region.

=== Kagoshima Spinning Mill Foreign Engineers' Residence ===
The Kagoshima Foreign Engineers' Residence (鹿児島紡績所技師館, Kagoshima bōsekijo gishikan (Ijinkan)) was a building constructed for use by foreign engineers hired by the domain to establish the mill. It was completed in 1867 and was a two-story wooden structure painted white on the west side of the factory, with a floor area of approximately 344 square meters. However, due to the increasing political instability in Japan, the engineers returned to the United Kingdom after only one year. the building was subsequently used as an office for a cannon factory, and in 1877 it was requisitioned as a temporary hospital by the Satsuma forces in the Satsuma Rebellion.

In 1884, the building was relocated to the site of Kagoshima Castle, but in 1936 was restored to its original location. It was initially thought to have been designed by Thomas Waters, who was also involved in the design of Ginza Bricktown, but because Waters had been building a sugar mill on Amami Oshima since 1866, it is now believed to have been designed and supervised by an Englishman connected to spinning mills.

In 1962 the building was designated an Important Cultural Property.

As a result of excavation work in 2010, the remains of the foundations of the main body of the Kagoshima Spinning Mill were discovered in the neighboring area, and on October 17, 2013, the designated area was expanded and the designated name of the National Historic Site was changed from "Kagoshima Spinning Mill Engineers' House (Ijinkan)" to "Kagoshima Spinning Mill Site".

== See also ==
- List of Historic Sites of Japan (Kagoshima)
- Sites of Japan’s Meiji Industrial Revolution: Iron and Steel, Shipbuilding and Coal Mining
