= Ibusuki Hashimuregawa Site =

National Historic Site in Ibusuki, Kagoshima Prefecture Japan

- 安国寺甕棺墓群 (Japanese)
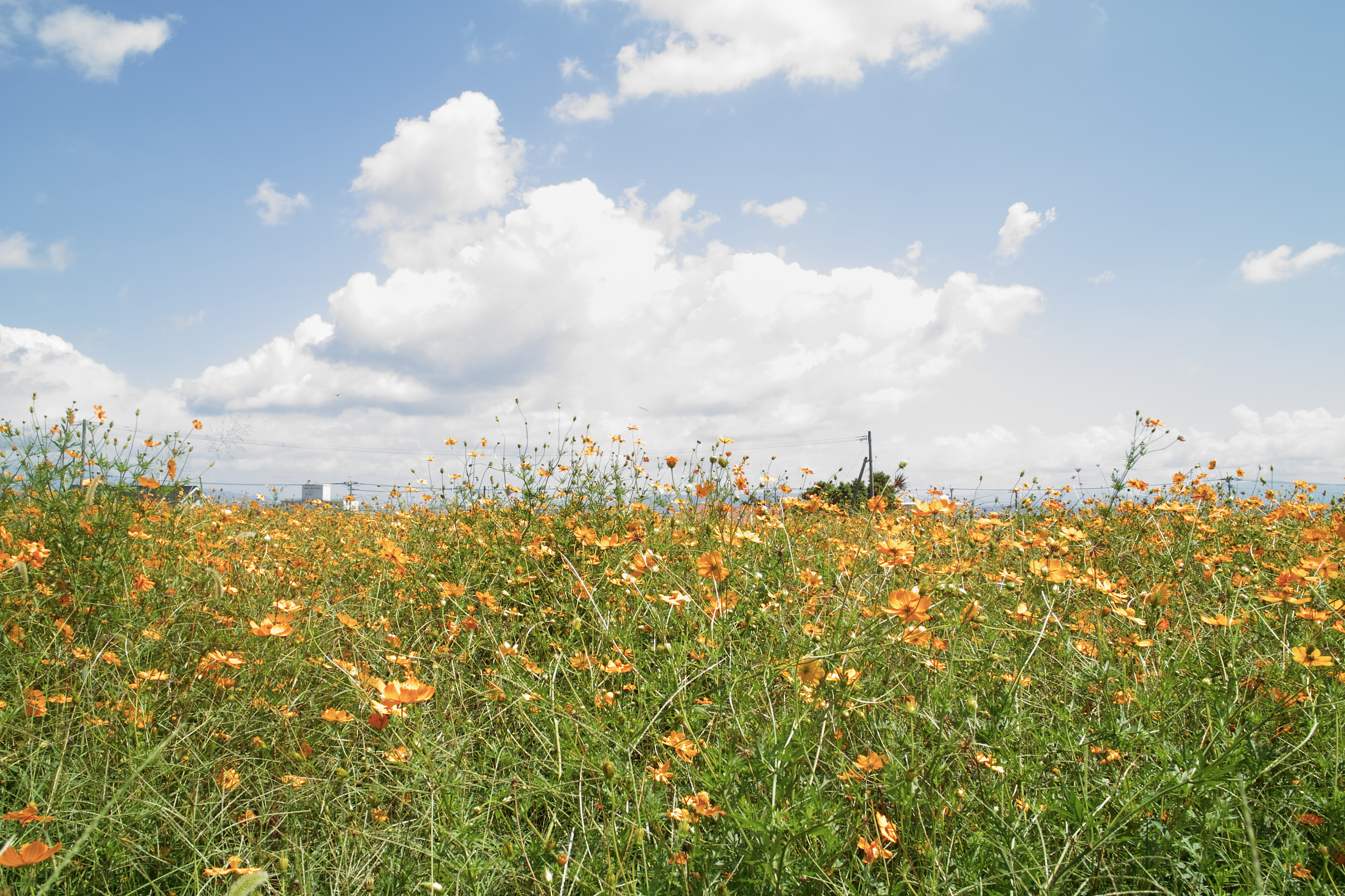
- Ibusuki Hashimuregawa Site

- Ibusuki Hashimuregawa Site Ibusuki Hashimuregawa Site (Japan)
- Interactive map of Ibusuki Hashimuregawa Site
- 31°13′46.3″N 130°38′43.3″E
- Type: Settlement
- Periods: Jōmon - Yayoi period
- Location: Ibusuki, Kagoshima, Japan
- Region: Kyushu

Site notes
- Public access: Yes (park and Museum)

The Ibusuki Hashimuregawa Site (指宿橋牟礼川遺跡, Ibusuki Hashimuregawa iseki) is a complex archaeological site with traces from the Jōmon and Yayoi Periods, located in the Junicho neighborhood of the city of Ibusuki, Kagoshima Prefecture Japan. It was designated a National Historic Site of Japan in 1924 under the name Ibusuki Site (指宿遺跡), but the area under protection was expanded in 1996 and the name changed to its present name. It is famous as the site that first academically clarified the relationship between the Jōmon and Yayoi periods, which had not been clear until then.

== Overview ==
The Ibusuki Hashimuregawa site is located on a gentle slope at an elevation of 14 to 18 meters, with a distant view of Kagoshima city to the east, and a hilly mountain range that makes up the western half of that city in the background. It was discovered in 1916 when a student at the old Shibushi Junior High School found shards of Jōmon and Yayoi pottery and asked an archaeologist investigate. Archaeological excavations were first conducted in 1918 and 1919. The initial finding indicated that Yayoi pottery was found in upper layers and Jōmon pottery in lower layers, with a barren layer of volcanic ash in between. In terms of stratigraphy, this meant that Jōmon pottery was older than Yayoi pottery, thus overturning the prevalent theory at the time that the two types of pottery were made by different ethnic groups in the same era. However, subsequent research has shown that what was believed to have been "Yayoi pottery" was actually "Narukawa-style pottery", a type of pottery from the late Kofun period unique to southern Kyushu, but this discrepancy does not invalidate the conclusion that there was a chronological transition from Jōmon to Yayoi pottery.

Subsequent excavations in 1988 uncovered the remains of a settlement buried in the eruption of Mount Kaimon in 874, an event which is recorded in the Nihon Sandai Jitsuroku. At this location as well, Yayoi pottery and Sue ware pottery were discovered in the dark brown volcanic ash layer above an earlier volcanic eruption layer that does not contain any artifacts, and Ibusuki-style pottery from the late Jōmon period was discovered in the layer below.

Currently, both banks of the Hashimure River have been developed as an archaeological park where visitors can see the artifact-containing conditions, and pit dwellings have also been restored. The Ibusuki City Archaeological Museum is adjacent to the site. It is about a 10-minute walk from Ibusuki Station on the JR Kyushu Ibusuki-Makurazaki Line.

== See also ==
- List of Historic Sites of Japan (Kagoshima)
