= Akagina Castle =

Castle ruins in Amami, Kagoshima, Japan

- 赤木名城; Akakina gusuku
- Kasari, Kagoshima Japan
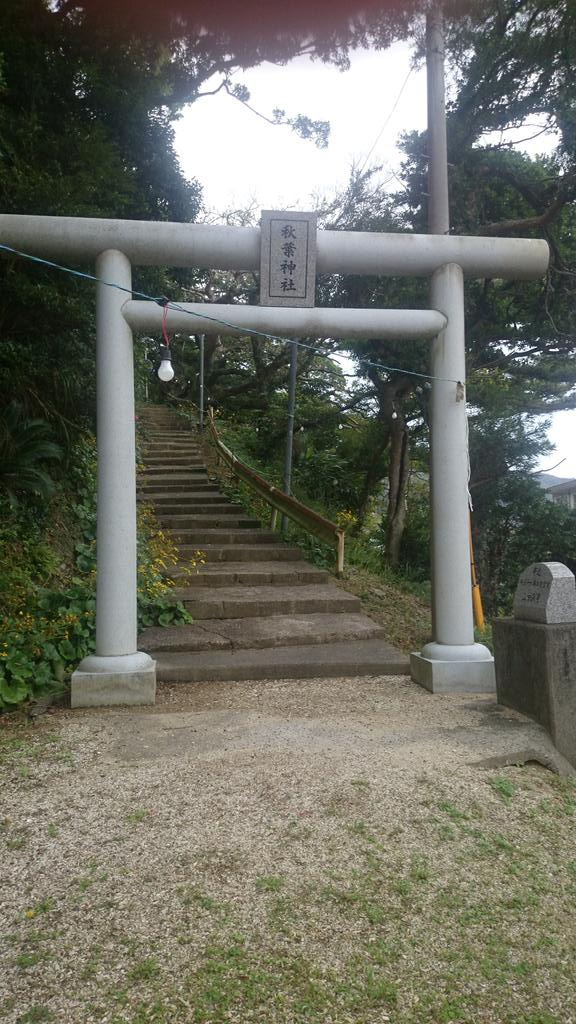
- Akiba Shrine, now on Akagina Castle ruins

Site information
- Type: yamajiro-style Japanese castle
- Open to the public: yes
- Condition: Archaeological and designated national historical site; castle ruins

Location
- Coordinates: 28°27′17.3″N 129°40′52″E
- National Historic Site of Japan

Akagina Castle (赤木名城, Akagina-jō; Amami:Akakina gusuku) was fortification located in what is now the Kasari neighborhood of the city of Amami, Kagoshima Prefecture Japan on the island of Amami Ōshima. It was built in the 12th century and was confirmed to have been in use until the 17th century. Its ruins have been protected as a National Historic Site since 2009.

== Overview ==
Akagina Castle was located on a hill behind a village overlooking Kasari Bay in the northeastern part of Amami Ōshima, at an elevation of about 100 meters, commonly known as Kamiyama. The ruins are located on a hilly ridge and is 350 meters north-to-south, 800 meters east-to-west, and has an area of 37,000 square meters, making it one of the largest in the region. The layout and structure of the castle are similar to mountain castles in Kyushu and other areas. The castle area is centered on the highest point at an elevation of 100 meters, and remains of enclosures, earthworks, stonework, dry moats, and vertical moats have been confirmed. A relatively wide enclosure extends to the south, and a series of belt enclosures stretches out over eight tiers on the western slope. Remains of pillar holes for building foundations and storage pits, as well as iron slag and scorched earth, indicating that blacksmithing techniques were introduced.

When the castle was constructed, trade between Japan and Song China was active, with sulfur and mother of pearl exported from the Amami Islands. From the late 14th century, the area suffered from attacks by Wokou pirates from the north, and the expanding Ryukyu Kingdom from the south. The castle was expanded extensively between the 15th and early 17th centuries, and Chinese celadon and other trade goods have been found. From the mid-15th century to the early 17th century, the castle came under the rule of the Ryukyus and was an important base for controlling maritime traffic and military affairs. This castle lacks the stone walls of castles that developed in the Ryukyu area from around the 14th century, and was constructed with more Japanese influence, similar to castles on the Kyushu mainland. The Shimazu army invaded the area in 1609 and made Akagina Castle a stronghold for control over the Amami Islands. The Akiba Shrine now on the castle site dates from this period.

The mountain on which Akakina Castle was built is considered a sacred mountain, and numerous Shinto shrines occupy much of the castle site. The castle ruins are about a 45-minute drive from Naze Port.

== See also ==
- List of Historic Sites of Japan (Kagoshima)

== Literature ==
- Benesch, Oleg and Ran Zwigenberg (2019). Japan's Castles: Citadels of Modernity in War and Peace. Cambridge: Cambridge University Press. p. 374. ISBN 9781108481946.
- De Lange, William (2021). An Encyclopedia of Japanese Castles. Groningen: Toyo Press. pp. 600 pages. ISBN 978-9492722300.
