= Nanpō Bunshi =

- 南浦文之
- Born: 1555; Obi, Hyuga Province, Japan
- Died: October 25, 1620 (aged 64–65); Aira, Satsuma Province, Japan

Nanpō Bunshi (南浦文之; 1555 - October 25, 1620) was a Rinzai school Buddhist priest in Sengoku to early Edo period Japan. He was also a Neo-Confucian scholar of the Satsunan school, and author of a number of books. He is especially noted as the author of an account of the history of firearms entitled Teppō-ki. and for Tō Ryūkyū shi narabi ni jo ("Verses and Preface on the Chastisement of Ryukyu”) describing the history of the Ryūkyū Kingdom and the justifications for the 1609 Shimazu invasion of Ryukyu.

== Biography ==
Nanpō Bunshi was born in Nangō Sotoura, Obi, Hyūga Province. His pseudonym "Nangō" comes from this place of birth. A child prodigy, he showed extraordinary talent from an early age and was called Manju-dō after the Buddhist bodhisattva of wisdom Manjushri. At the age of 12, he was tonsured and entered the Nichiren sect temple of Enmei-ji (now Saimyō-ji) in Nichinan, under the given name Genshō. He studied Zen and Japanese Neo-Confucianism under Ichiō Genshin of Ryūgen-ji, a disciple of Keian Genju, and Song dynasty studies of the Four Books and Five Classics and the Book of Changes under Jiangxia Yuxian of the Ming dynasty. He excelled in the exegesis of chapters and verses. In 1569, at the age of 15 he went to Kyoto and became the successor of Kishun Ryūki of Ryūgin-an sub-temple of Tofuku-ji. In 1583 he returned to Kyushu and became head priest of Jingō-ji in Osumi Province and then Shōjū-in in Hyūga Province. He also studied Neo-Confucianism under Koka Yuken, a Chinese scholar who had become a retainer of the Shimazu clan.

In 1599 he was invited to accompany Shimazu Yoshihiro to Kyoto. In 1602, he was invited by the Shimazu clan to be the founder of the temple of Dairyū-ji, which was sponsored by Shimazu Iehisa. The following year, in 1603, he was appointed to serve as an envoy to Tokugawa Ieyasu at Sunpu, and at Ieyasu's recommendation, he held a purification ceremony at Kenchō-ji, and was summoned by Emperor Gomizunoo to give a lecture on new commentaries on the Four Books at the Imperial Court. He was known for his deep scholarship. He was in charge of the diplomatic correspondence of Satsuma Domain with Ming China and the Ryukyu Kingdom. He inherited the school of Neo-Confucianism known as the "Satsuma school", which was started by Keian Genju, and revised the annotations that Genju had added to the Annotated Four Books. He is also credited with coining the name Jigen-ryū to a style of Japanese swordsmanship practiced by Satsuma Domain samurai.

=== Grave of Nanpō Bunshi ===
Nanpō Bunshi's grave is located in the cemetery of the temple of Ankoku-ji in Aira, Kagoshima. It was designated as a National Historic Site in 1936. Ck.
