= Yoron Castle =

Castle/fortification in Yoronjima, Kagoshima

Yoron Castle 与論城
- Yoron

Site information
- Type: Gusuku
- Open to the public: yes
- Condition: Ruins

Location
- Yoron Castle
- Location within Kagoshima Prefecture Location within Japan
- Coordinates: 27°01′38.8″N 128°25′45.1″E

Site history
- Built: c. early 15th century
- Materials: Ryukyuan limestone, wood
- National Historic Site of Japan

Yoron Castle (与論城, Yoron jō) was a northern Ryūkyūan fortification located on the island of Yoronjima, Kagoshima Prefecture, Japan. Its ruins have been protected by the central government as a National Historic Site since 2025.

== Overview ==
Yoron Castle was located on a plateau about 90 meters high that juts out to the south on the southwestern corner of the island of Yoron. The western side uses the natural cliff as a fortification, while the northern and southeastern sides are lined with stone walls extending for 200 meters. According to local traditions, the castle lords was constructed by the third son of the King Min of Hokuzan on the island of Okinawa between 1405 and 1416, or Hanagusuku Masaburo, a figure from the reign of King Shō Shin, considered the golden age of the Second Shō Dynasty of the Ryukyu Kingdom.

However, archaeological excavations conducted in 1993 and from 2020 to 2023 found that the site could be stratified into six distinct periods. Period I (12th to late 13th centuries) was a settlement, and only the post holes for dwellings were found. Period II (early to mid-14th century) marked the construction of gusuku-style stone wall fortifications. Period III (late 14th to mid-15th century) is thought to be the period when the current castle area was developed, with construction of the lower part of the cliff, stone walls, and buildings. Investigations of the large stone walls at the base of the cliff and the surrounding areas revealed the construction method of using backfill for the stone walls and the construction of flat surfaces using earthworks. Furthermore, excavations of the flat area at the foot of the cliff revealed multiple postholes along with leveled ground, indicating that a building once stood there. In addition, a large variety and quantity of artifacts were unearthed, including Chinese celadon and white porcelain, brown-glazed pottery, Bizen ware, glass products, stone artifacts with red pigment (bengara), arrowheads, knives, mirrors, and tuyeres, suggesting that the area was heavily utilized. The artifacts are similar to those found at Nakijin Castle lending credence to the legend that Hokuzan dispatched personnel to develop the castle site as a foothold for their expansion into the Amami Islands.

Period IV (late 15th to 16th centuries), corresponds to the period when Hokuzan was destroyed during the unification of the three kingdoms of Okinawa by Shō Hashi and is marked by a sharp decrease the amount of artifacts, suggesting that the castle, while not completely abandoned, was not used much during this time. Period V (17th-18th centuries) corresponds to the period under Satsuma Domain rule. The topsoil layers and older topsoil layers found during excavations were formed by cultivation and other uses during this time, and in the surrounding areas, traces of ditches and stone walls marking field boundaries were constructed.

Currently, the site is the grounds of Tokonushi Shrine and Kotohira Shrine. It was designated a town-designated historical site on February 20, 1976, and a national historical site on March 10, 2025.

== See also ==
- List of Historic Sites of Japan (Kagoshima)
