= Omonawa Shell Mound =

Archaeological site in Isen, Kagoshima, Japan

Omonawa Shell Midden
- 面縄貝塚 (Japanese)
- Omonawa Shell Midden Omonawa Shell Mound (Japan)
- Interactive map of Omonawa Shell Midden
- 27°40′26″N 128°57′55″E
- Type: shell midden
- Periods: late Jōmon - Yayoi period
- Location: Isen, Kagoshima, Japan
- Region: Kyushu

Site notes
- Public access: Yes

The Omonawa Midden (面縄貝塚, Omonawa kaizuka) is an archaeological site in the Omonawa neighborhood of the town of Isen, Kagoshima on the island of Tokunoshima, Japan. The midden was designated a National Historic Site of Japan in 2017.

== Overview ==
During the Jōmon period, sea levels were five to six meters higher than at present, and the ambient temperature was also two deg C higher. During this period, the Jōmon people often lived in coastal settlements, with a hunter-gatherer culture. These middens associated with such settlements contain bone, botanical material, mollusc shells, sherds, lithics, and other artifacts and ecofacts associated with the now-vanished inhabitants, and these features, provide a useful source into the diets and habits of Jōmon society. Most of these middens are found along the Pacific coast of Japan.

The Omonawa shell midden consists four middens located around a cove on the southern coast of Tokunoshima, about three kilometers east of the Isen town center. The shell mounds were discovered in 1928, and several archaeological excavations were conducted from 1930 to 1956. It is widely known as a landmark site for the pottery chronology of the Ryukyu Islands. The remains of dwellings, stone-collecting remains, stone coffin tombs have also been discovered, revealing that the site is composed of a residential area, a burial area, and shell mounds. Shell mounds 1 and 3 are located at the foot of a raised coral reef cliff, at the western and eastern ends of the site. Both have yielded Yayoi pottery dating to the late Yayoi period. Shell mound 2 is located on a coastal sand dune, and has mainly yielded land snails (Okinawayama snails), as well as giant clams and green oysters. In addition to pottery, from the late Late Jomon period stone tools, bone tools, and shell tools have also been excavated Shell mound 4 is located in a cave in a raised coral reef cliff about 150 meters north of the second shell mound, and has also yielded pottery, stone tools, and bone tools, as well as human bones. The period of continuity corresponds to the period from the late Jōmon period to the Yayoi period, from approximately 7,000 years ago to approximately 1,400 years ago.

== See also ==
- List of Historic Sites of Japan (Kagoshima)
