= Satsuma Kokubun-ji =

- 薩摩国分寺 (Japanese)
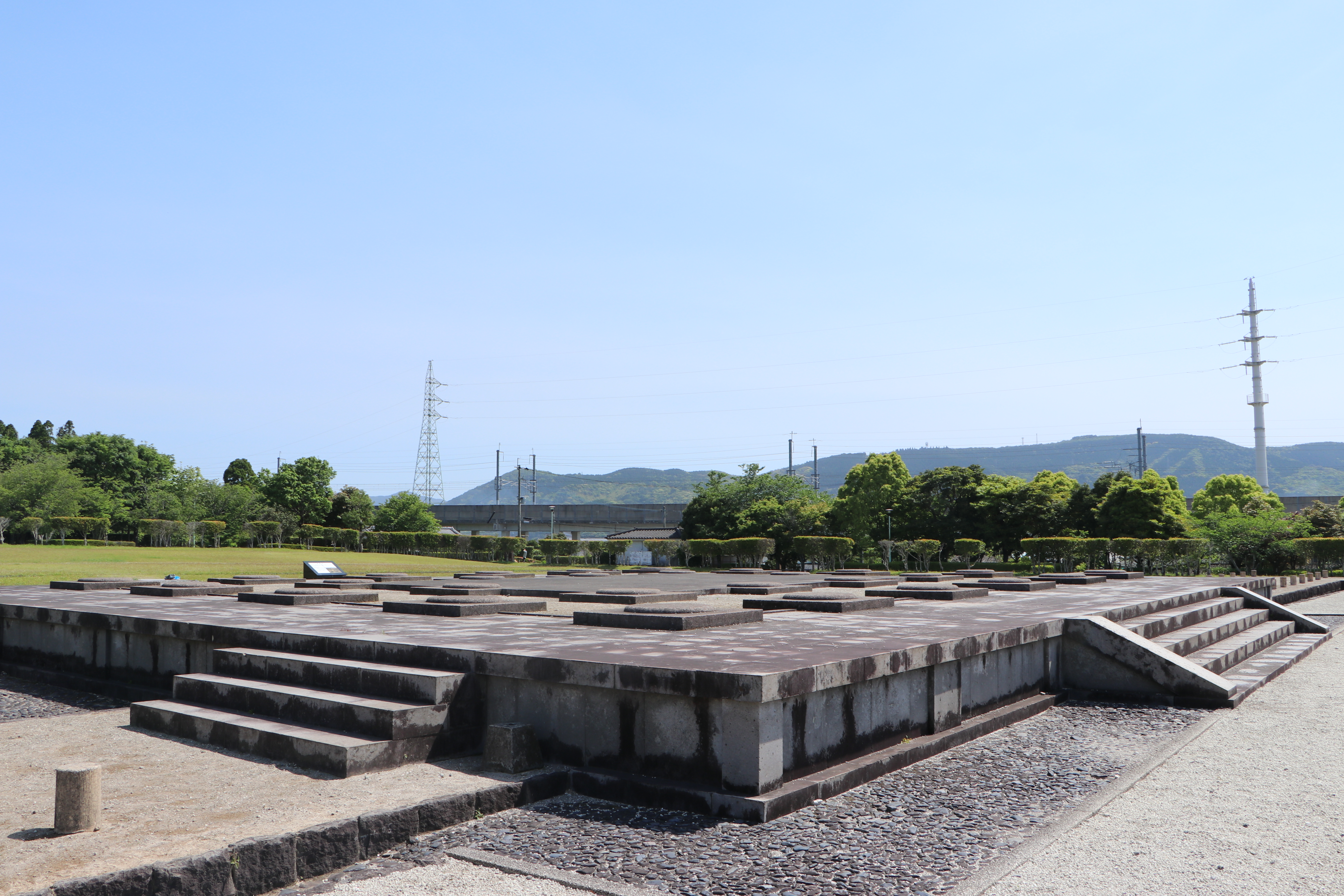
- Satsuma Kokubun-ji ruins

- Satsuma Kokubun-ji ruins Satsuma Kokubun-ji (Japan)
- Interactive map of Satsuma Kokubun-ji
- 31°49′55.2″N 130°18′22.8″E
- Type: temple ruins
- Periods: Nara - Heian period
- Location: Satsumasendai, Kagoshima, Japan
- Region: Kyushu region

History
- Built: 8th century AD

Site notes
- Public access: Yes (park)

The Satsuma Kokubun-ji (薩摩国分寺) was a Buddhist temple in located in the Kokubunchō neighborhood of the city of Satsumasendai, Kagoshima Prefecture in the Kyushu region of Japan. It was the provincial temple ("kokubunji") of former Satsuma Province. Its location is now an archaeological site, which has been preserved as a National Historic Site since 1944. with the area under protection expanded in 1976 and 1982.

== Overview ==
The Shoku Nihongi records that in 741 AD, as the country recovered from a major smallpox epidemic, Emperor Shōmu ordered that a monastery and nunnery be established in every province, the kokubunji (国分寺). These temples were built to a semi-standardized template, and served both to spread Buddhist orthodoxy to the provinces, and to emphasize the power of the Nara period centralized government under the Ritsuryō system.

The Satsuma Kokubun-ji is located is located north of the city, on the eastern edge of a plateau at an elevation of 13 meters. In 1944, the remains of the pagoda consisting of 14 foundation stones was designated as a National Historic Site under the name "Satsuma Kokubunji Pagoda ruins." After that, the remains of the main hall and other structures were discovered, and in 1976, almost the entire temple grounds and the remains of the Tsurumine tile kiln, which supplied roof tiles for the temple and which is located about one kilometer northeast, were additionally designated. Later, the foundations of a building was found in the neighboring land to the southwest of the designated site, and this area was further added to the National Historic Site in 1982. Although the temple is not listed in the Shoku Nihongi dated 756, based on the results of numerous archaeological excavations, the temple is believed to have been built in the late 8th century, which is slightly later than most of the kokubunji temples

The temple grounds are small, measuring about 130 meters north-to-south and 118 meters east-to-west, which is smaller than most kokubunji temples The layout of the temple complex is with the South Gate, Middle Gate, Main Hall, Lecture Hall, and North Gate located on a central axis, with a pagoda to the east in front of the Main Hall, and a secondary Main Hall to the west, is patterned after Kawara-dera in Asuka, Nara. This layout is also unusual for a kokubunji temple, and these factors may have been influenced by the great distance of Satsuma from the capital. The original temple was destroyed by fire and rebuilt in the 10th century on an enlarged scale, but this also soon disappeared. It was rebuilt again in the Kamakura period on a much smaller scale and existed as the Jingū-ji for the Kokufu Tenman-gū shrine, but was destroyed during Toyotomi Hideyoshi's conquest of Kyushu in 1586. It was restored by Shimazu Mitsuhisa, daimyō of Satsuma Domain. It was destroyed a final time in 1868 by the early Meiji government's haibutsu kishaku anti-Buddhism movement.

Currently, the site is maintained as the Satsuma Kokubunji Ruins Historical Park, and in addition to the remains of the tower, the remains of the lecture hall, the Main Hall, and the North Gate have been restored. It is about a 22-minute walk from Kami Sendai Station on the Hisatsu Orange Railway.

Only the remains of the tower were discovered early on, and the cornerstone was transported to a temple in the city in 1888, but was returned to the discovery site in 1944 and became a national historic site. In 1976, the entire area of 1.5 hectares was designated as a historic site, and in 1985 it was developed as "Satsuma Kokubunji Site Park".

== See also ==
- Provincial temple
- List of Historic Sites of Japan (Kagoshima)
