= Shigechiyo Izumi =

Purported Japanese supercentenarian

- 泉 重千代
- Shigechiyo Izumi with a group of 10 children
- Born: 29 June 1865 (disputed); Isen, Tokunoshima, Satsuma Domain (modern-day Japan)
- Died: 21 February 1986 (purportedly aged about 120); Isen, Ōshima District, Kagoshima, Japan
- Known for: Claimed longevity

Shigechiyo Izumi (泉 重千代, Izumi Shigechiyo; died 21 February 1986) was a Japanese man who was titled the oldest living person after the death of Niwa Kawamoto on 16 November 1976, also from Japan. Izumi's claimed birth date of 29 June 1865 was accepted by Guinness World Records, which recognized him as the oldest verified man ever, but this was eventually withdrawn in 2010; in the 2012 edition of the Guinness World Records book, Christian Mortensen was named the "oldest verified man ever" and Izumi was not mentioned.

== Biography ==
Guinness World Records found a document attesting that he was 24 years old in 1889 when he was exempted from military service to deal with sugar cane fields.

Izumi drank brown sugar shōchū (a Japanese alcoholic beverage often distilled from barley or rice), and took up smoking at age 70. Izumi's personal physician strongly advised him against drinking shōchū as his kidneys were not strong enough to process shōchū in his advanced age, but Izumi went on to say: "Without shōchū there would be no pleasure in life. I would rather die than give up drinking." He retired from sugar cane farming in 1970.

== Death and uncertainty over age ==
After a brief hospitalization, Izumi died of pneumonia at 21:15 JST on 21 February 1986, the same day as Jeanne Calment's 111th birthday. At the time, he was considered the only person ever verified to have reached the age of 120, although subsequent research has cast doubt on his actual age. In April 1987, 14 months after Izumi's death, the Department of Epidemiology at the Tokyo Metropolitan Institute of Gerontology reported that research into Izumi's family registration records indicated he might have been 105 when he died. The 2011 Guinness World Records book states that the birth certificate submitted as evidence might have actually belonged to a deceased brother, and the family may have re-used "Shigechiyo" as a necronym.

With the closing of the Guinness World Record Museum in Niagara Falls, Ontario, in September 2020, the display and fibreglass statue of Izumi was sold for $850 on 12 February 2021 and now resides in a private collection in Canada.

The oldest undisputed case of male longevity is Jiroemon Kimura, also from Japan, who died at age 116 years and 54 days. Jeanne Calment holds the record for oldest female and oldest human ever, at 122 years and 164 days.

== See also ==
- Longevity myths
- Senescence
- Supercentenarian
