= Wadomari, Kagoshima =

Wadomari 和泊町 wadwumai
- Town
- Wadomari Town
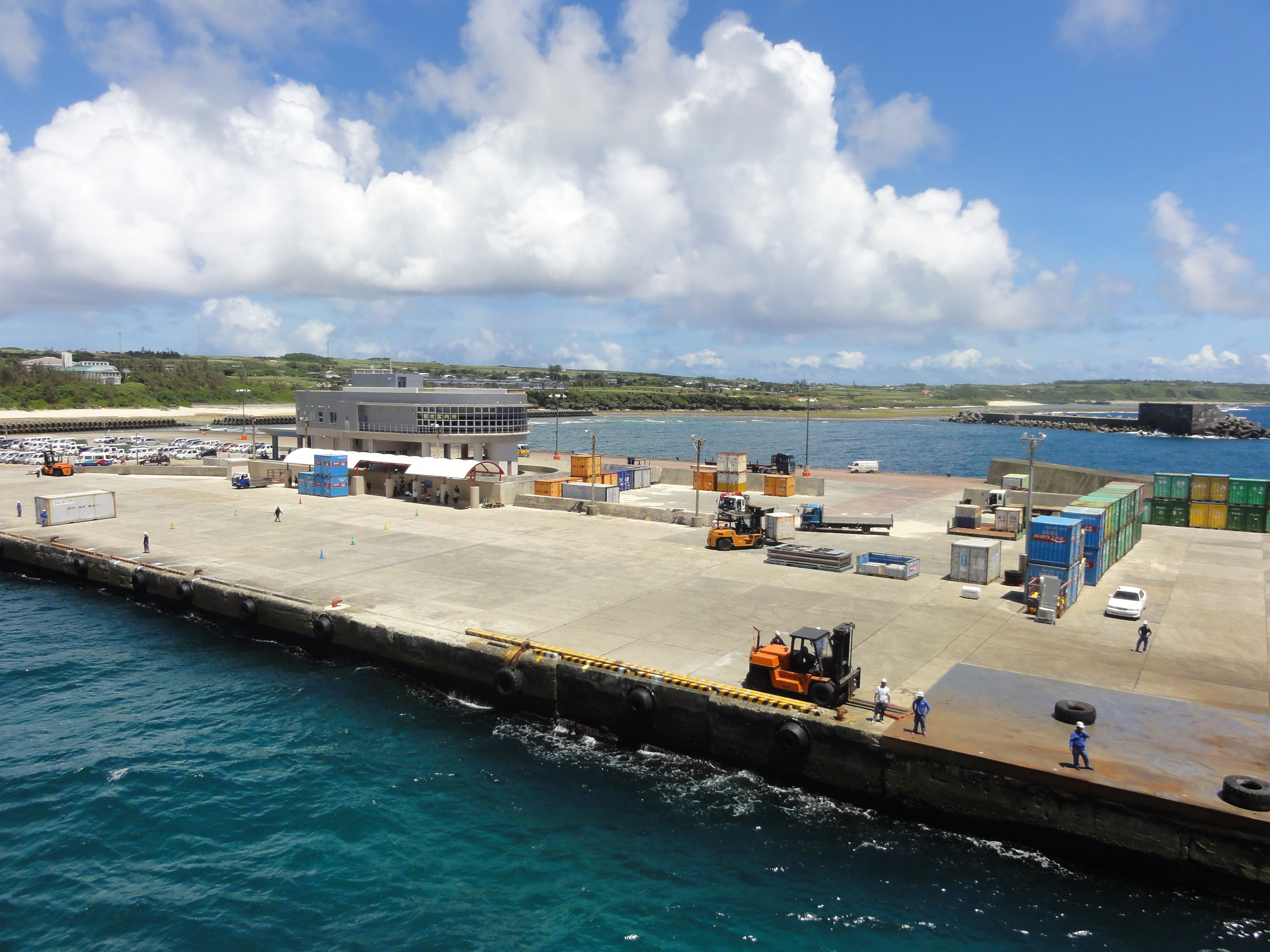
- Wadomari Port

- Flag Emblem

- Location of Wadomari in Kagoshima Prefecture

- Coordinates: 27°24′0″N 128°38′57″E
- Country: Japan
- Region: Kyushu (Amami Islands)
- Prefecture: Kagoshima Prefecture
- District: Ōshima

Government
  - -Mayor: Sanetoshi Ijichi

Area
  - Total: 40.37 km^{2} (15.59 sq mi)

Population (October 1, 2020)
  - Total: 6,246
  - Density: 155/km^{2} (400/sq mi)
- Time zone: UTC+9 (Japan Standard Time)
- Tree: Banyan
- -Flower: Teppōyuri
- Phone number: 0997-92-1111
- Address: 10, Wadomari, Wadomari-chō, Ōshima-gun, Kagoshima-ken 891-9192
- Website: www.town.wadomari.lg.jp

Wadomari (Japanese: 和泊町, Hepburn: Wadomari cho; Kunigami: wadwumai) is a town located on Okinoerabujima, in Ōshima District, Kagoshima Prefecture, Japan.

As of October 2020, the town has an estimated population of 6,246 and a population density of 155 persons per km^{2}. The total area is 40.37 km^{2}.

== Geography ==
Wadomari is located on the northern end of Okinoerabujima.

== Climate ==
The climate is classified as humid subtropical (Köppen climate classification Cfa) with very warm summers and mild winters. Precipitation is high throughout the year, but is highest in the months of May, June and September. The area is subject to frequent typhoons.

=== Surrounding municipalities ===
- China

== History ==
Wadamori Village was founded on 1 April 1908. It was upgraded to town status on 1 May 1941. As with all of Okinoerabujima, the town came under the administration of the United States from 1 July 1946 to 25 December 1953.

== Economy ==
Sugar cane, sweet potato, and peanut farming are popular. Floriculture is also practiced. However, due to the lack of local jobs, there has been an outflow of residents.

== Transportation ==
Wadomari Port is the main ferry port on the island, with connections to the prefectural capital Kagoshima. It takes between 17 and 18 hours. Okinoerabu Airport, is located in Wadomari. Wadomari is located on Kagoshima Prefectural Route 84.

== Education ==
Junior high schools:

- Shirogaoka Junior High School (JA)
- Wadomari Junior High School (JA)

Elementary schools include:

- Kunigami Elementary School (国頭小学校)
- Naishi Elementary School (内城小学校)
- Oshiro Elementary School (大城小学校)
- Wadomari Elementary School (和泊小学校)

Okinoerabu High School, located in China, is operated by the Kagoshima Prefectural government. It was formed in 1949 through the merger of China High School and Wadomari High School. It initially had separate campuses in China and Wadomari.
