= Tanegashima Airport =

Tanegashima Airport 種子島空港
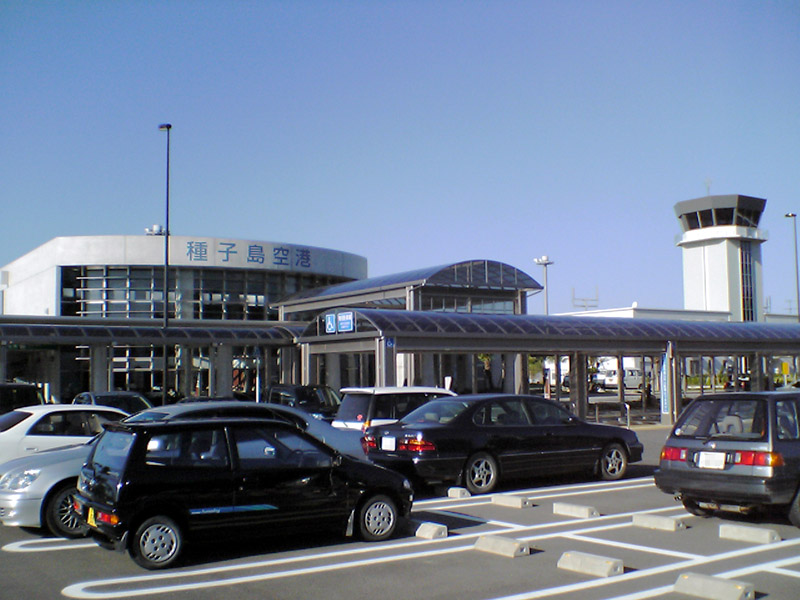
- IATA: TNE; ICAO: RJFG

Summary
- Airport type: Public
- Operator: Government
- Location: Tanegashima, Kagoshima Prefecture, Japan
- Elevation AMSL: 768 ft (234 m)
- Coordinates: 30°36′18″N 130°59′30″E

Map
- Location in Japan RJFG (Japan)

Runways
Direction	Length		Surface
Direction	m	ft	Surface
13/31	2,000	6,562	Asphalt concrete

Statistics (2015)
- Passengers: 74,633
- Cargo (metric tonnes): 139
- Aircraft movement: 3,359
- Source: Japanese Ministry of Land, Infrastructure, Transport and Tourism

Tanegashima Airport (種子島空港, Tanegashima Kūkō) (IATA: TNE, ICAO: RJFG) is located in Nakatane, on Tanegashima, one of the Ōsumi Islands in southern Kagoshima Prefecture, Japan. The airport uses the brand Cosmoport Tanegashima (コスモポート種子) in homage to Tanegashima Space Center, which is located on the island.

The original Tanegashima Airport was opened on 27 July 1962, at a site approximately 8 kilometres (5.0 mi) southeast of the present airport. Although its runway was extended from 1,000 m (3,300 ft) to 1,500 m (4,900 ft) in 1973, it was not suitable to handle jet aircraft, and was closed on 16 March 2006, the day that the New Tanegashima Airport, with a 2,000 m (6,600 ft) runway, was opened. The new airport was officially known as New Tanegashima Airport (新種子島空港, Shin-Tanegashima Kūkō) until June 2008, when it was renamed to simply Tanegashima Airport.

== Airlines and destinations ==
=== Passenger ===
Airlines	Destinations
J-Air	Osaka–Itami
Japan Air Commuter	Fukuoka, Kagoshima
