= Keian Genju =

- 桂庵 玄樹
- Keian Genju at Kagoshima
- Born: 1427; Shimonoseki, Nagato Province, Japan
- Died: June 28, 1508 (aged 80–81); Kagoshima, Satsuma Province, Japan

For the Japanese era, see Keian (1648-1652).

Keian Genju (桂庵 玄樹; 1427 – June 28, 1508) was a Rinzai school Buddhist priest and Confucian scholar in late Muromachi period Japan, who is noted for forming the Satsunan school of Japanese Neo-Confucianism. who studied classics under Ishō at Nanzen-ji.

== Biography ==
Keian was born in Akamagaseki, Nagato Province (present day Shimonoseki, Yamaguchi). When he was nine years old, he became a monk and went to study at Kyoto's Nanzen-ji. Afterwards, he went to Manju-ji Temple in Bungo Province for further study and was invited by Ōuchi Yoshitaka to become the chief priest of Eifuku-ji in Nagato Province, his hometown. Keian accompanied the 1466 mission to the Ming court in China. In Beijing, he was favored by the Chenghua Emperor. He studied in Suzhou and other places, where he developed an interest in Neo-Confucianism. Keian delayed his return to Japan until 1475., but took refuge in Iwami Province to escape the ravages of the Onin War. In 1478, he was invited by Shimazu Tadamasa to become chief priest of Shōkō-ji in Ōsumi Province and Ryūgen-ji in Hyūga Province. Furthermore, he was invited by Shimazu Tadayoshi to lecture on Neo-Confucianism at Keijū-in in Satsuma Province.

In 1481, Keian published his translation of Zhu Xi's Collective Commentaries on the Great Learning, the first such translation of that work into Japanese. This made him famous as the founder of the Satsunan school of Neo-Confucianism. He later went on to become chief priest of Kennin-ji and Nanzen-ji in Kyoto. At the age of 76, he retired to Toki-an (the location of his grave) in Satsuma and died at the age of 82.

=== Grave of Keian ===
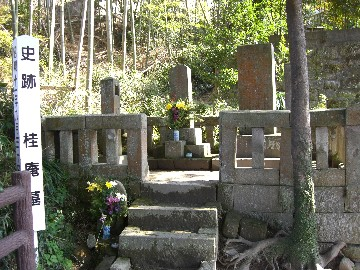
Tomb of Keian Genju in Kagoshima

Keian's grave is located in the cemetery of Keijū-in in Ishikichō, a neighborhood of Kagoshima City, at the foot of a mountain to the west of the city. The grave was constructed by his disciples on the 25th anniversary of his death, but a tombstone was not erected until 1722. It was designated as a National Historic Site in 1936. Currently, the whole area is maintained as Keian Park.

The grave is about 4.8 kilometers north of JR Kyushu Kagoshima-Chūō Station.

== See also ==
- Dōgen
- Eisai
- Ingen
