= Isen, Kagoshima =

Isen 伊仙町 Isyn
- Town
- Isen chō
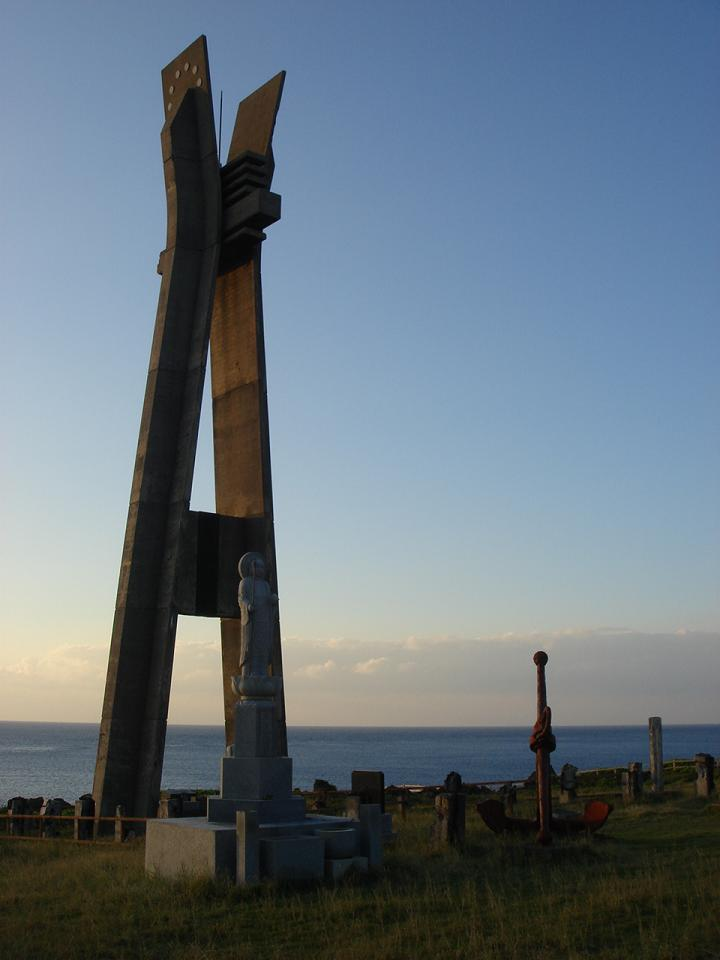
- Cape Itabu

- Flag Seal
- Interactive map of Isen
- Coordinates: 27°40′24″N 128°56′16″E
- Country: Japan
- Region: Kyushu (Amami Islands)
- Prefecture: Kagoshima
- District: Ōshima

Area
  - Total: 62.71 km^{2} (24.21 sq mi)

Population (November 30, 2024)
  - Total: 6,137
  - Density: 97.86/km^{2} (253.5/sq mi)
- Time zone: UTC+9 (Japan Standard Time)
- Phone number: 0997-86-3111
- Address: 891-8293 Kagoshima-ken Ōshima-gun Isen-chō Isen 1842
- Climate: Cfa
- Website: Official website
- Symbols
- Flower: Hibiscus
- Tree: Ficus microcarpa

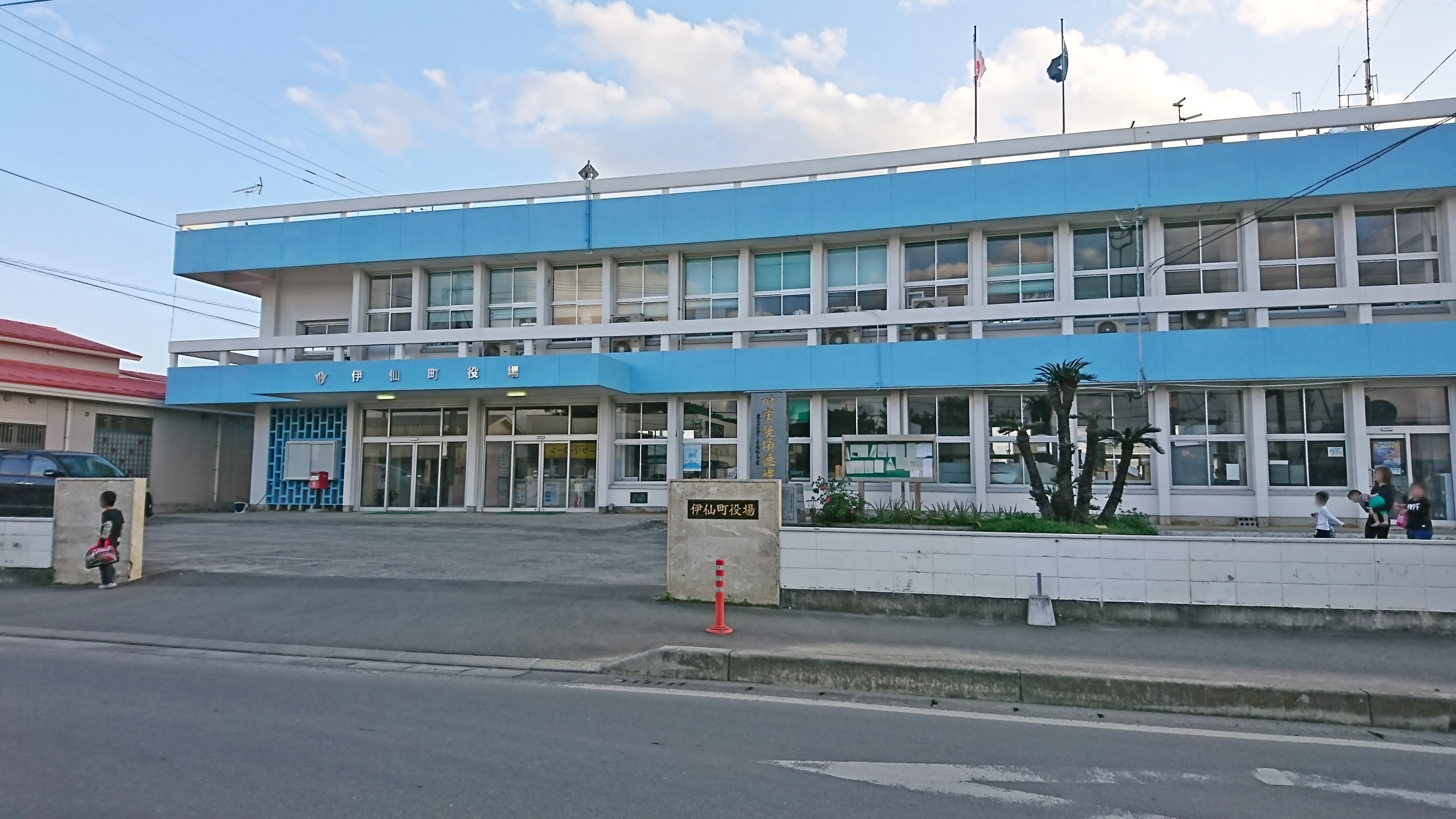
Isen Town Hall

Isen (Japanese: 伊仙町, Hepburn: Isen chō; Tokunoshima: Isyn) is a town located on Tokunoshima, in Ōshima District, Kagoshima Prefecture, Japan. As of 30 November 2024, the town had an estimated population of 6,137 in 3048 households and a population density of 10 persons per km^{2}. The total area of the village is 62.71 km^{2} (24.21 sq mi).

== Geography ==
Isen occupies the southwestern tip of the island of Tokunoshima, with the East China Sea to the west and Pacific Ocean to the east. Most of the area is outside the mountainous areas of Tokunoshima, and it has the highest percentage of arable land area among the three towns on Tokunoshima. However, it is mainly made up of Ryukyu limestone, and its water conditions are the worst among the three towns. There are many limestone caves in the town. A major feature of the karst topography of Isen is that rivers are characterized by the fact that they go underground, carving deep valleys, and then emerge above ground to carve deep valleys again. The coastline is filled with coral reefs and oddly shaped rocks caused by marine erosion. Parts of the town were designated as part of the Amami Guntō National Park in 2017.

=== Surrounding municipalities ===
- Amagi
- Tokunoshima

=== Climate ===
The climate is classified as humid subtropical (Köppen climate classification Cfa) with very warm summers and mild winters (average temperature 21.1 °C (70.0 °F)). Precipitation is high throughout the year, but is highest in the months of May, June and September. Because of its climate, tropical and sub-tropical fruits are in abundance.

Climate data for Isen (1991−2020 normals, extremes 1977−present)
Month	Jan	Feb	Mar	Apr	May	Jun	Jul	Aug	Sep	Oct	Nov	Dec	Year
Record high °C (°F)	24.4 (75.9)	24.6 (76.3)	26.6 (79.9)	28.1 (82.6)	30.8 (87.4)	33.0 (91.4)	34.8 (94.6)	35.2 (95.4)	34.0 (93.2)	32.5 (90.5)	29.7 (85.5)	27.0 (80.6)	35.2 (95.4)
Mean daily maximum °C (°F)	18.3 (64.9)	18.6 (65.5)	20.5 (68.9)	22.9 (73.2)	25.7 (78.3)	28.4 (83.1)	31.4 (88.5)	31.6 (88.9)	30.4 (86.7)	27.4 (81.3)	23.9 (75.0)	20.1 (68.2)	24.9 (76.9)
Daily mean °C (°F)	15.2 (59.4)	15.5 (59.9)	17.3 (63.1)	19.7 (67.5)	22.6 (72.7)	25.5 (77.9)	28.3 (82.9)	28.4 (83.1)	27.1 (80.8)	24.3 (75.7)	20.9 (69.6)	17.0 (62.6)	21.8 (71.3)
Mean daily minimum °C (°F)	12.3 (54.1)	12.6 (54.7)	14.2 (57.6)	16.8 (62.2)	20.0 (68.0)	23.5 (74.3)	26.0 (78.8)	26.0 (78.8)	24.6 (76.3)	21.7 (71.1)	18.3 (64.9)	14.3 (57.7)	19.2 (66.5)
Record low °C (°F)	4.6 (40.3)	5.3 (41.5)	4.1 (39.4)	9.0 (48.2)	13.3 (55.9)	16.1 (61.0)	19.1 (66.4)	21.4 (70.5)	19.0 (66.2)	13.4 (56.1)	10.5 (50.9)	6.5 (43.7)	4.1 (39.4)
Average precipitation mm (inches)	104.9 (4.13)	99.0 (3.90)	154.8 (6.09)	162.7 (6.41)	208.0 (8.19)	349.1 (13.74)	170.6 (6.72)	174.6 (6.87)	189.7 (7.47)	162.3 (6.39)	113.0 (4.45)	98.8 (3.89)	1,987.4 (78.24)
Average precipitation days (≥ 1.0 mm)	11.3	10.6	12.3	11.4	12.4	13.3	7.6	11.3	12.5	9.6	9.0	11.0	132.3
Mean monthly sunshine hours	91.8	87.2	112.2	125.2	129.7	131.5	236.0	228.2	186.2	164.3	128.4	102.5	1,724.5
Source: Japan Meteorological Agency

=== Demographics ===
Per Japanese census data, the population of Isen is as shown below:

Historical population
Year	Pop.	±%
1940	13,725	—
1950	17,190	+25.2%
1960	16,234	−5.6%
1970	12,142	−25.2%
1980	10,318	−15.0%
1990	8,821	−14.5%
2000	7,769	−11.9%
2010	6,844	−11.9%
2020	6,139	−10.3%

== History ==
Archaeological sites have revealed historic ruins (pottery and tools) dating back 30,000 years. The now famous Kamuiyaki ware were discovered in 1983 and declared a National Historic Site in 2006. The findings suggest that the Sue ware pottery that spread around the Ryukyu Islands and up into the Kyushu mainland were largely made in Tokunoshima. From the 15 Century, Tokushima was part of Kingdom of Ryukyu but was annexed by Kagoshima Domain in the early 17 Century.

On April 1, 1908, the village of Shimajiri Village was founded with the establishment of the modern municipalities system. It was renamed Isen on June 29, 1921. As with all of Tokunoshima, the village came under the administration of the United States from 1 July 1946 to 25 December 1953. On 1 January 1962, Isen was upgraded to town status.

== Government ==
Isen has a mayor-council form of government with a directly elected mayor and a unicameral village council of 14 members. Isen, collectively with the other municipalities of Oshima District, contributes two members to the Kagoshima Prefectural Assembly. In terms of national politics, the town is part of the Kagoshima 2nd district of the lower house of the Diet of Japan.

== Economy ==
While mountainous in the north, the majority of land is relatively flat and arable, making Isen a prime location for agriculture. Isen's main agricultural products include sugar cane, potatoes, pumpkins, horticulture, and fruit trees.

== Education ==
Isen has eight public elementary school and three public junior high schools operated by the town government. The town does not have a high school.

== Transportation ==
=== Railways ===
Isen, as with the rest of Tokunoshima, does not have any passenger railway services.

=== Highways ===
Isen is not located on any national highway or expressway.

== Local attractions ==
Isen has numerous sightseeing locations, including the Kamyuiki Ruins, Cape Inutabu, Yamamoto War Memorial, Seta-umi Beach, Kinenbama Beach, and a historical museum showcasing many of the archaeological discoveries found in Isen.

Among historical sites is Shigechiyo Izumi's (泉重千代) grave site. Shigechiyo was Isen's oldest resident, being born on June 29, 1865, and dying February 21, 1986, making him 120 years old at the time of his death. He was inducted into the Guinness Book of World Records for being the oldest living person alive; however subsequent research has brought into question his birth date. He is now widely considered to have lived until he was 105 years old, putting his real birthday as June 29, 1880.

Isen is also famous for Tōgyū (bullfighting). Different from western bullfighting, in Tōgyū two bulls fight each other while people cheer them on. There are four main tournaments held every year: January (New Year Tournament), May (Golden Week Tournament), August, and October (All Tokunoshima Championship).

== Noted people from Isen ==
- Shigechiyo Izumi – Japanese centenarian
