= Kamuiyaki ware =

Type of Ryukyuan pottery

Kamuiyaki ware (カムィヤキ), from Tokunoshima kamïyaki, is grey stoneware produced in Tokunoshima, the Amami Islands, Kagoshima Prefecture, Japan, from the 11th century to the early 14th century, or from the late Shellmidden period to the Gusuku period.

== Kiln sites ==
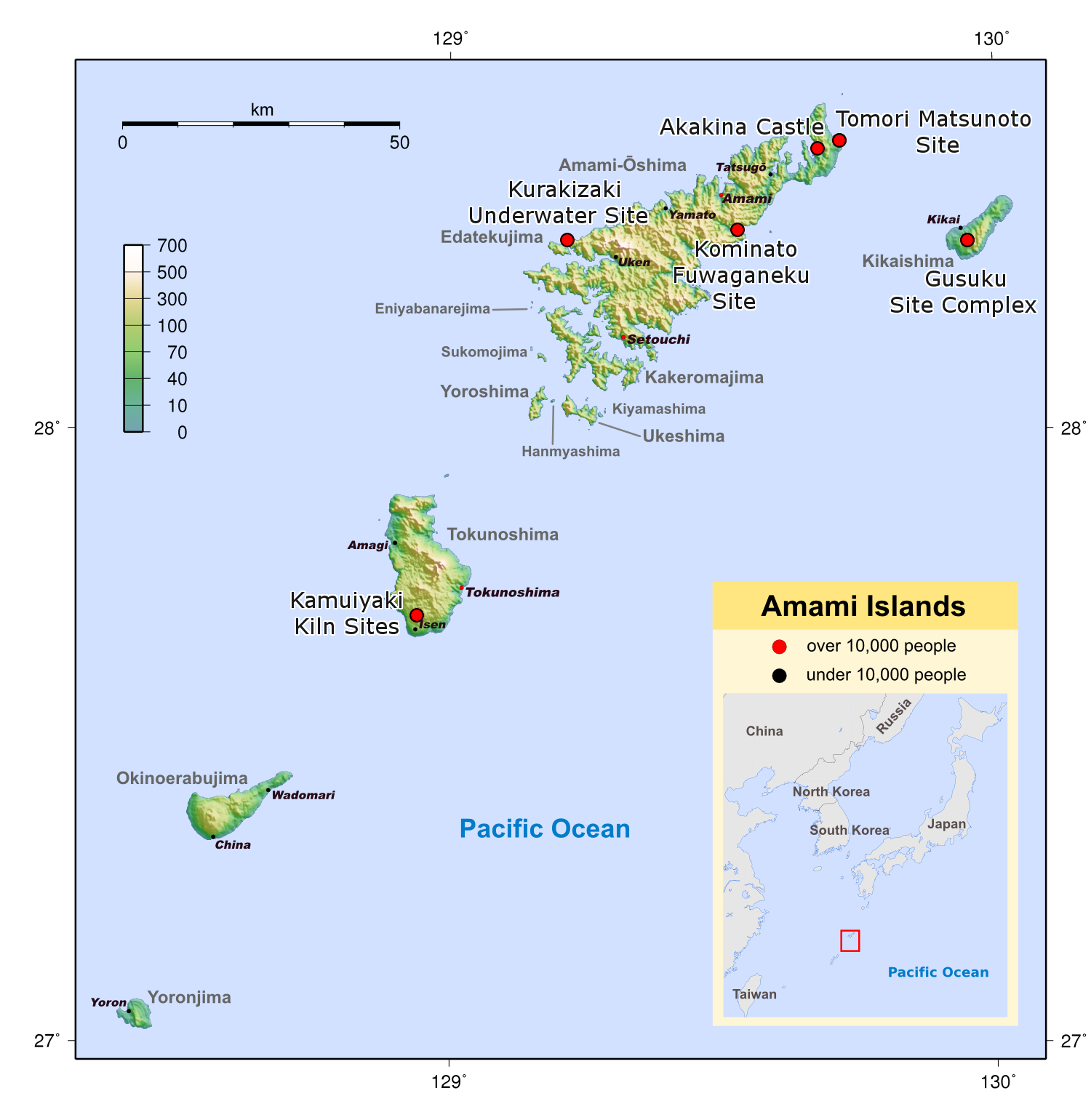
Location of the kamuiyaki kiln sites (center)

Kamuiyaki ware were excavated from various sites in Amami, Okinawa and Yaeyama. However, it remained a mystery for a long time where they were produced. Prior to the discovery of kiln sites, kamuiyaki were known as rui-sueki (類須恵器) or sue-like ware.

The first kiln site was discovered by two local researchers, Yotsumoto Nobuhiro and Gi Norikazu, in 1983. It was located around a pond (カムィヤキ池, 亀焼池) in Isen Town of Tokunoshima, after which kamuiyaki was named. The English spelling "kamuiyaki" is a transliteration of katakana "カムィヤキ." The sequence "ui" does not represent a diphthong but a short central vowel /ï/ of the Tokunoshima language. Thus the spelling kamïyaki would be more accurate. The word kamï regularly corresponds to Japanese language kame (甕, urn) although its homonym kame (亀, tortoise) is assigned to the place name.

Subsequent investigations found more than 100 kilns. They are clustered into seven groups, namely Asan-Kamuiyaki, Asan-Yanagida (South), Asan-Yanagida (North), Isen-Higashiyanagida, Isen-Hirasuko, Kenpuku-Iyagawa and Kenpuku-Utta. In 2007, they were designated as a national historic site.

Archaeologist Takanashi Osamu argues that Tokunoshima was suitable for pottery because it was a "high" island as contrasted with "low", raised limestone islands such as Kikai, Okinoerabu and Yoron Islands. It had abundant forest resources that enabled pottery firing. Unlike Amami Ōshima, another high island, it also had plains for cultivation, making it possible to feed potters.

== Distribution ==
A report by archaeologist Ikeda Yoshifumi in 2003 lists about 350 archaeological sites with kamuiyaki. They stretch from the Satsuma Peninsula of southern Kyūshū to Yonaguni Island of the Yaeyama Islands.

In southern Kyūshū, kamuiyaki were excavated from sites near the month of the Manose River, Minamisatsuma, Kagoshima Prefecture. The Mottaimatsu Site, which was at its peak from the middle 12th century to the first half of the 13th century, had a huge variety of goods including kamuiyaki, a large number of Chinese ceramics such as Longquan celadon and Tong'an celadon, and in smaller quantity, sue wares from eastern Harima Province and Tokoname-yaki from Owari Province. Kamuiyaki were also found at the neighboring Wataribata and Shibahara Sites, and at the Kozono Site in the interior. Archaeologist Miyashita Takahiro argued that the Manose River basin had served as a trade center connected to Hakata–Dazaifu of northern Kyūshū. The presence of kamuiyaki suggests that this region was involved in the trade with the Southern Islands although excavated wares were slightly newer (around the 13th century) than archaeologists expected them to be.

In the Amami Islands, in which the kiln sites are located, the emergence of kamuiyaki led to the disappearance of native Kaneku-type earthenwares in the first half of the 11th century. Only a small number of earthenwares continued to be produced and they imitated soapstone cauldrons. The common vessel forms of kamuiyaki include urns (kame), small mouthed, short necked jars (tsubo), wide mouth jars (hachi), grating bowls (suribachi) and bowls (wan).

What distinguishes the Amami Islands from other island groups was the presence of the Gusuku Site Complex in Kikai Island. This archaeological site complex lasted for a long time from the 9th century. In its second peak, from the latter half of the 11th century to the first half of the 12th century, an exceptionally large quantities of sue wares, haji wares, kamuiyaki, and soapstone cauldrons produced in the Nishisonogi Peninsula, Nagasaki Prefecture were used together with Chinese white glazed wares, Chinese celadons, Goryeo ceramics and Goryeo unglazed stonewares. The Gusuku Site Complex is noted for its non-native nature and resemblance to Dazaifu, the administrative center of Kyūshū. It is highly probable that the Gusuku Site Complex was constructed by people under the State of Japan although Amami was not formally incorporated into the administrative system of Japan.

Kamuiyaki found in the Okinawa Islands are characterized by their association with white glazed wares, soapstone cauldrons and locally produced earthenwares. These earthenwares, collectively called gusuku wares, were urns, small mouthed jars, wide mouth jars, bowls and dishes. They were considered to be imitations of exotic goods including Amami's kamuiyaki. According to archaeologist Takanashi Osamu, insufficient supply of exotic goods accounts for the production of gusuku wares. Okinawan archaeologists generally argue that gusuku wares replaced earlier flat bottomed pottery. Ikeda Yoshifumi raised doubts and suspected that flat bottomed pottery and gusuku wares had co-existed in the 11th to 12th centuries. In his hypothesis, gusuku wares represented an external power that took time to assimilate indigenous societies that produced flat bottomed pottery.

The southern island groups of Miyako and Yaeyama are known for their peculiar archaeological development: a pottery culture was followed by a potteryless culture and then by another pottery culture. Kamuiyaki, together with white glazed wares, soapstone cauldrons and brown glazed wares, were found at the Ōdomaribama Site (circa 12th century) of Hateruma, the Yaeyama Islands, which Okinawan archaeologists consider represents the final stage of the potteryless culture. The Sumiya Site of Miyako Island has kamuiyaki and soapstone cauldrons but no white glazed ware. Kamuiyaki were excavated more often in Miyako than in Yaeyama.

With the introduction of the combination of kamuiyaki, soapstone cauldrons and white glazed wares, Miyako and Yaeyama departed from a distinct potteryless culture and entered a pottery culture, which is sometimes known as the Suku Culture. It means that these southern island groups were finally integrated into a large culture (in an archaeological sense) of northern origin.

== Technological background ==
Yoshioka Yasunobu traces that kamuiyaki technological roots to Goryeo's unglazed stoneware. Some link kamuiyaki to the Sagariyama Kiln Sites of Kyūshū. However, Shinzato Akito argues that judging from typological differences in wares and kilns, kamuiyaki were not directly influenced by Sagariyama. Shinzato dismisses Yoshioka's hypothesis that kamuiyaki production was triggered by people from southern Kyūshū. He concludes that Hakata (northern Kyūshū)-based merchants may brought Goryeo potters to Tokunoshima. They monopolized the wide-area trading network that connected Japan to Song China and Goryeo, which is confirmed by mass excavation of Chinese and Goryeo pottery in Hakata and Dazaifu.

Yoshioka and Shinzato separately proposed their chronologies of kamuiyaki. However, Ikeda Yoshifumi pointed out their incompatibility with a recently excavated archaeological site in Amami.

== Interpretations ==
Some archaeologists consider that kamuiyaki were exchanged for Turbo shells (yakōgai). Massive amounts of Turbo shells were excavated from archaeological sites of the Amami Islands, dating from the 7th century onwards. Turbo shells were consumed in Japan. For example, nearly 30 thousand pieces of Turbo shells were used at Chūson-ji of Hiraizumi (northeastern Japan) in the 12th century.

Asato Susumu claimed that the one who had distributed kamuiyaki and soapstone cauldrons from Amami to Yaeyama was "Ryūkyū's merchants" (琉球の商人). Ikeda Yoshifumi dismisses this claim and assumes an "external power" that saw the whole archipelago as a trading market.

With progress in Amami's archaeological investigation, Takanashi Osamu dropped his earlier kamuiyaki-for-Turbo-shell hypothesis. He noted kamuiyaki's skewed distribution: the major points of consumption were limited to Kikai Island and Tokunoshima of the Amami Islands. The number of kamuiyaki pieces found in Okinawa, Miyako and Yaeyama was small and that was the reason why local earthenwares imitating kamuiyaki were produced there. Takanashi hypothesized that the primary purpose of kamuiyaki production in Tokunoshima had been to supply a demand for commodities at the Gusuku Site Complex of Kikai Island, a supposed outpost of the State of Japan.

== Links ==
- (in Japanese) Registration of kiln sites as a nationally designated Historic Site
