= Nakatane, Kagoshima =

Nakatane 中種子町
- Town
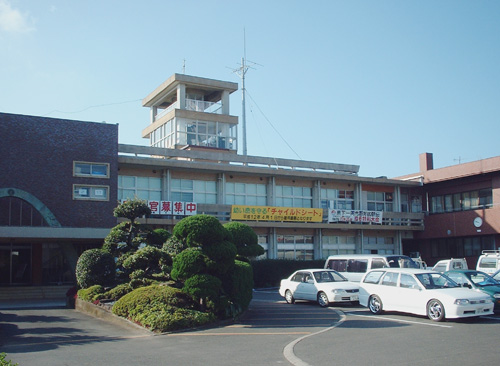
- Nakatane Town Hall

- Flag Seal
- Location of Nakatane in Kagoshima Prefecture

- Coordinates: 30°31′59″N 130°57′31″E
- Country: Japan
- Region: Kyushu (Ōsumi Islands)
- Prefecture: Kagoshima
- District: Kumage

Area
  - Total: 136.94 km^{2} (52.87 sq mi)

Population (April 30, 2024)
  - Total: 7,196
  - Density: 52.55/km^{2} (136.1/sq mi)
- Time zone: UTC+9 (Japan Standard Time)
- Phone number: 099-222-3141
- Address: 5186, Nonaka, Nakanotane-cho, Kumage-gun, Kagoshima-ken 891-3692
- Climate: Cfa
- Website: Official website
- Symbols
- Flower: Hibiscus mutabilis; Alpinia zerumbet
- Insect: Hebomoia glaucippe
- Tree: Oak

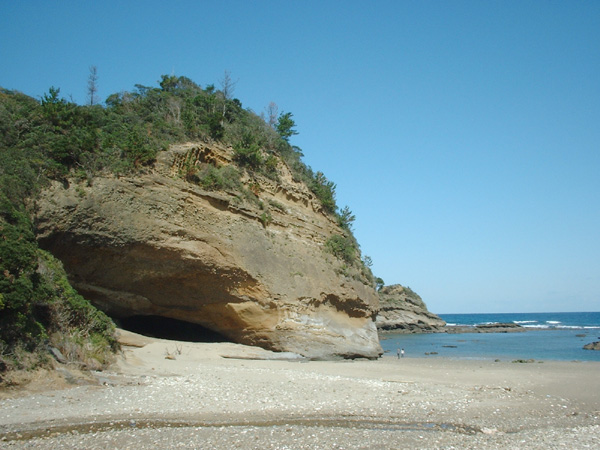
coast of Nakatane

Nakatane (中種子町, Nakatane-chō) is a town located on the island of Tanegashima, in Kumage District, Kagoshima Prefecture, Japan. As of 30 April 2024, the town had an estimated population of 7,196 in 4087 households, and a population density of 53/km^{2} (140/sq mi). The total area of the town is 136.94 km^{2} (52.87 sq mi).

== Geography ==
Nakatane occupies the center of the island of Tanegashima, with the East China Sea to the west and the Pacific Ocean to the east. The Noma district, where the town hall is located, is a key transportation point, and all national and prefectural roads that traverse the island pass through here.

=== Surrounding municipalities ===
- Minamitane
- Mishima
- Nishinoomote

=== Climate ===
The climate is classified as humid subtropical (Köppen climate classification Cfa) with very warm summers and mild winters. Precipitation is high throughout the year, but is highest in the months of May, June and September.

Climate data for Nakatane (2006−2020 normals, extremes 2006−present)
Month	Jan	Feb	Mar	Apr	May	Jun	Jul	Aug	Sep	Oct	Nov	Dec	Year
Record high °C (°F)	21.5 (70.7)	23.1 (73.6)	24.7 (76.5)	26.9 (80.4)	29.7 (85.5)	31.1 (88.0)	32.9 (91.2)	33.2 (91.8)	31.7 (89.1)	29.8 (85.6)	26.2 (79.2)	25.2 (77.4)	33.2 (91.8)
Mean daily maximum °C (°F)	12.6 (54.7)	13.8 (56.8)	16.3 (61.3)	19.4 (66.9)	22.7 (72.9)	25.0 (77.0)	28.7 (83.7)	29.4 (84.9)	27.2 (81.0)	23.7 (74.7)	19.4 (66.9)	14.9 (58.8)	21.1 (70.0)
Daily mean °C (°F)	9.5 (49.1)	10.5 (50.9)	12.8 (55.0)	15.9 (60.6)	19.4 (66.9)	22.4 (72.3)	25.8 (78.4)	26.5 (79.7)	24.3 (75.7)	20.7 (69.3)	16.3 (61.3)	11.7 (53.1)	18.0 (64.4)
Mean daily minimum °C (°F)	6.1 (43.0)	7.0 (44.6)	9.1 (48.4)	12.4 (54.3)	16.2 (61.2)	20.2 (68.4)	23.7 (74.7)	24.3 (75.7)	22.0 (71.6)	17.9 (64.2)	12.7 (54.9)	8.0 (46.4)	15.0 (59.0)
Record low °C (°F)	−2.2 (28.0)	−3.0 (26.6)	−1.0 (30.2)	3.4 (38.1)	6.6 (43.9)	15.3 (59.5)	17.6 (63.7)	19.6 (67.3)	15.6 (60.1)	8.7 (47.7)	3.7 (38.7)	−0.1 (31.8)	−3.0 (26.6)
Average precipitation mm (inches)	105.6 (4.16)	155.1 (6.11)	207.5 (8.17)	229.6 (9.04)	311.1 (12.25)	632.2 (24.89)	272.2 (10.72)	188.9 (7.44)	311.9 (12.28)	243.3 (9.58)	167.7 (6.60)	140.0 (5.51)	2,989.2 (117.69)
Average precipitation days (≥ 1.0 mm)	10.2	12.0	12.9	11.9	12.0	18.7	10.6	12.5	14.3	10.7	10.4	10.5	146.7
Source: Japan Meteorological Agency

== Demographics ==
Per Japanese census data, the population of Nakatane is as shown below:

Historical population
Year	Pop.	±%
1920	11,072	—
1930	10,949	−1.1%
1940	11,802	+7.8%
1950	17,587	+49.0%
1960	19,321	+9.9%
1970	14,775	−23.5%
1980	12,297	−16.8%
1990	10,552	−14.2%
2000	9,675	−8.3%
2010	8,696	−10.1%
2020	7,539	−13.3%

== History ==
The area of Nakatane was part of ancient Tane Province, which was abolished in 824 and incorporated into Ōsumi Province. Tanegashima became a part of Shimazu shōen in 1140. During the Edo Period, the area was part of the holdings of Satsuma Domain. Sugarcane was first cultivated in 1824. Nakatane Village was established on April 1, 1889. A power station was built in 1925, and the first telephone was installed in 1938. On November 10, 1940, Nakatane was upgraded to town status. Tanegashima Airport opened in Nakatane in 1958.

== Government ==
Nakatane has a mayor-council form of government with a directly elected mayor and a unicameral town council of 12 members. Nakatane, collectively with the other municipalities of Kumage District and the city of Nishinoomote, contributes two members to the Kagoshima Prefectural Assembly. In terms of national politics, the town is part of the Kagoshima 4th district of the lower house of the Diet of Japan.

== Economy ==
The economy of Nakatane is based largely on agriculture (sugar cane, sweet potatoes), livestock (cattle, pigs, etc.), and fisheries.

== Education ==
Nakatane has seven public elementary high schools and one public junior high school operated by the town government, and one public high school operated by the Kagoshima Prefectural Board of Education. The prefecture also operates a special education school for the handicapped.

== Transportation ==
=== Airport ===
- New Tanegashima Airport

=== Highways ===
- National Route 58

== In popular culture ==
Nakatane is featured in the Japanese animated feature film, 5 Centimeters Per Second, directed by Makoto Shinkai. It was released on March 3, 2007, in Japan.

== Noted people from Nakatane ==
- Wakashimazu Mutsuo, sumo wrestler
