= China, Kagoshima =

China 知名町 Jinnya
- Town
- China Town
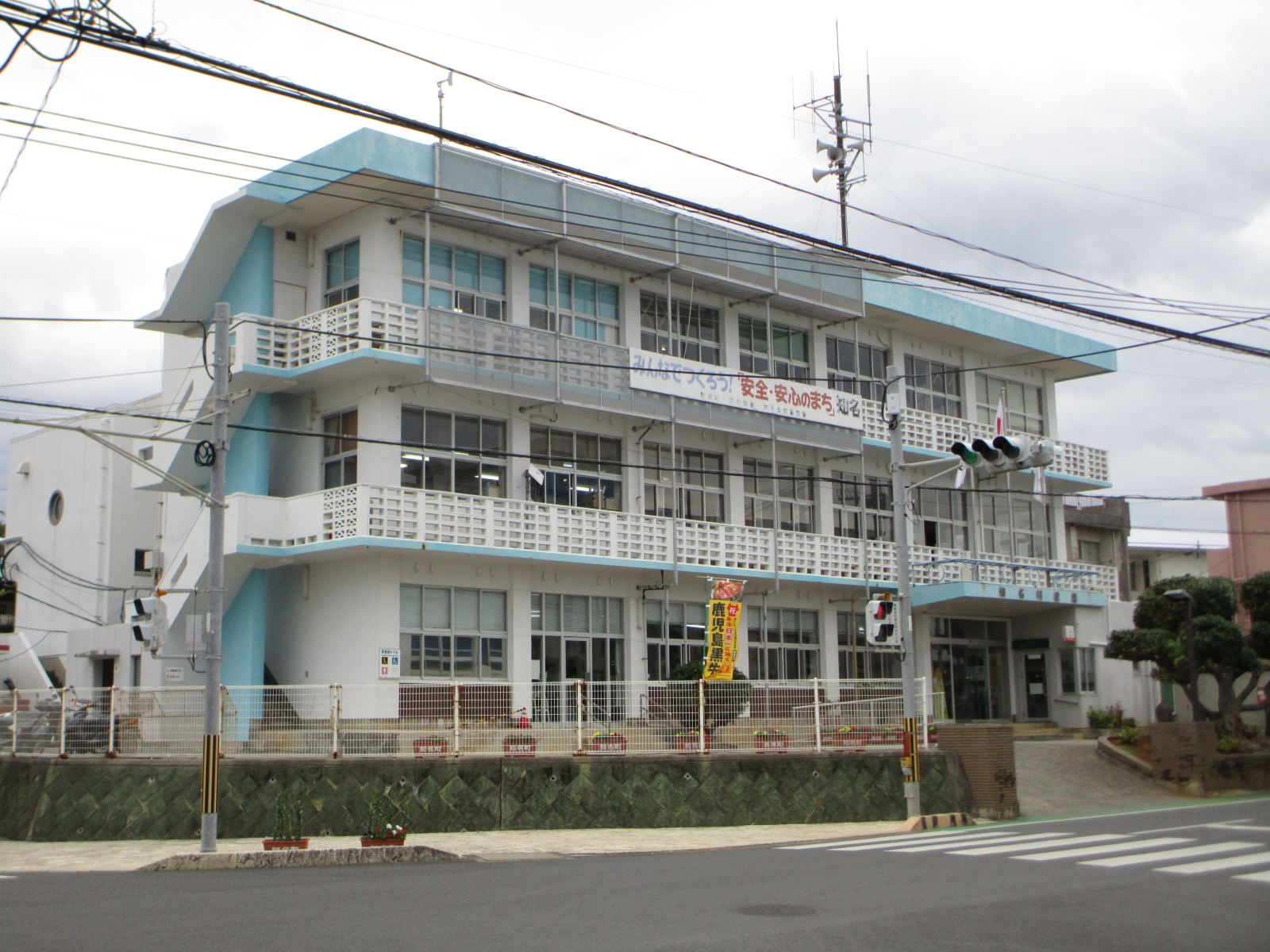
- China Town Office

- Flag Seal

- Location of China in Kagoshima Prefecture

- Coordinates: 27°21′0″N 128°34′0″E
- Country: Japan
- Region: Kyushu (Amami Islands)
- Prefecture: Kagoshima Prefecture
- District: Ōshima

Government
  - -Mayor: Masamori Hirayasu

Area
  - Total: 53.29 km^{2} (20.58 sq mi)

Population (October 1, 2020)
  - Total: 5,750
  - Density: 108/km^{2} (280/sq mi)
- Time zone: UTC+9 (Japan Standard Time)
- Tree: Banyan
- -Flower: Hibiscus
- Phone number: 0997-93-3111
- Address: 307, China, China-chō, Ōshima-gun, Kagoshima-ken 891-9295
- Website: www.town.china.lg.jp

China (知名町, China-chō; IPA: [tɕina]; English: /tʃiˈnɑː/ chee-NAH; Kunigami: ジンニャ Jinnya) is a town located on Okinoerabujima, in Ōshima District, Kagoshima Prefecture, Japan.

As of October 2020, the town has an estimated population of 5,750 and a population density of 108 persons per km^{2} (280 people/sq mi). The total area is 53.29 km^{2} (20.6 sq mi).

== Geography ==
China is located on the southern end of Okinoerabujima. The town's one-kilometre-long (0.62 mi) Yuhmu Beach (屋子母海岸) is about five minutes from the harbor by bus. NHK describes it as one of the most beautiful beaches on the island. Other natural seaside attractions include Ushishi Beach (ウシシ海岸) and Tannya Cape (田皆岬).

Another tourist attraction in the town is the 3,500-meter (11483 ft; 2.2 mi) long Shōryū Caves (昇竜洞). They were discovered in 1963 and partially opened to the public that same year.

== Climate ==
The climate is classified as humid subtropical (Köppen climate classification Cfa) with very warm summers and mild winters. Precipitation is high throughout the year, but is highest in the months of May, June and September. The area is subject to frequent typhoons.

=== Surrounding municipalities ===
- Wadomari

== History ==
China Village was founded in 1888. As with all of Okinoerabujima, the village came under the administration of the United States from 1 July 1946 to 25 December 1953. It was promoted from village to town status in 1946.

== Economy ==
Sugar cane, sweet potato, and peanut farming are popular. Floriculture is also practiced. A total of 1,958 hectares (4,838 acres; 7.6 sq mi) of land are under cultivation in the town. However, due to the lack of local jobs, there has been an outflow of residents.

== Transportation ==
China is located on Kagoshima Prefectural Route 84. The only airport serving the area, the Okinoerabu Airport, is about 80 minutes away in neighboring Wadomari. There also is a ferry to the prefectural capital Kagoshima from China Port. It takes between 17 and 18 hours.

== Education ==
Primary and junior high school education in China is controlled by the five members of the Education Committee, whose members serve four year terms. The town has five kindergartens, five primary schools, two middle schools, and one senior high school. The high school, Okinoerabu High School, controlled by Kagoshima Prefecture, was formed in 1949 through the merger of China High School and Wadomari High School. It initially had separate campuses in China and Wadomari.

List of schools in China
Name	Number of students
Kindergartens
China Kindergarten	39
Sumiyoshi Kindergarten	13
Tamina Kindergarten	9
Kamishiro Kindergarten	0 (classes suspended)
Shimohirakawa Kindergarten	25
Primary schools
China Primary School	222
Sumiyoshi Primary School	53
Tamina Primary School	35
Kamishiro Primary School	23
Shimohirakawa Primary School (JA)	109
Middle schools
China Middle School (JA)	129
Tamina Middle School (JA)	65
High schools
Okinoerabu High School	337

There is also a municipal library.

== Public facilities ==
There are two medical clinics, four dental clinics, and one hospital in the town. There are also two nursing homes.

The Ōyama Japan Self-Defense Forces base is located about 10 minutes from the center of town by bus, near the Ōyama Camping Grounds.

== Culture ==
China has a distinctive form of lion dance, believed to have been transmitted from Okinawa in the 18th century. Another local traditional dance is the Daija-Odori (大蛇踊り; literally, "big snake dance"), consisting of a snake puppet suspended in mid-air from a frame and manipulated by strings. It is performed to a taiko drum and sanshin (Okinawan three-stringed banjo) accompaniment.

Popular local dishes include the traditional tofu-misozuke, prepared by drying tofu in the sun and then adding miso. A more recent innovation adds kimchi to the dish.
