= Minamitane, Kagoshima =

Minamitane 南種子町
- Town
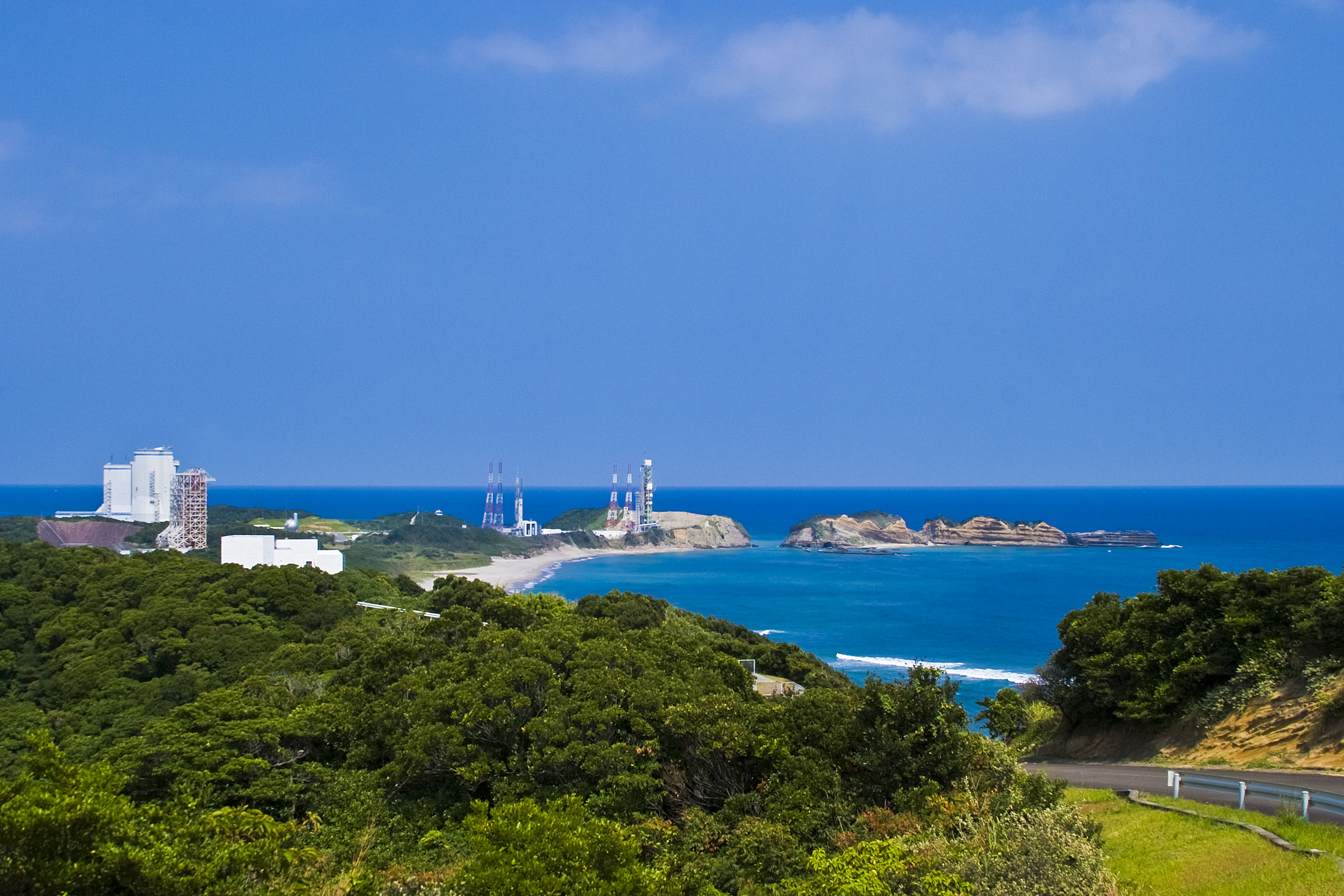
- Tanegashima Space Center

- Flag Seal
- Interactive map of Minamitane
- Coordinates: 30°34′49″N 130°54′03″E
- Country: Japan
- Region: Kyushu (Ōsumi Islands)
- Prefecture: Kagoshima
- District: Kumage

Government
  - -Mayor: Hironori Kajiwara (since May 2011)

Area
  - Total: 109.94 km^{2} (42.45 sq mi)

Population (April 30, 2024)
  - Total: 5,249
  - Density: 47.74/km^{2} (123.7/sq mi)
- Time zone: UTC+9 (Japan Standard Time)
- Phone number: 0997-26-1111
- Address: 2793-1 Nakanoue, Minamitane-chō, Kumage-gun, Kagoshima-ken 891-3792
- Climate: Cfa
- Website: Official website
- Symbols
- Flower: Hibiscus
- Mascot: Chuta-kun and Umi-chan
- Tree: Myrica rubra

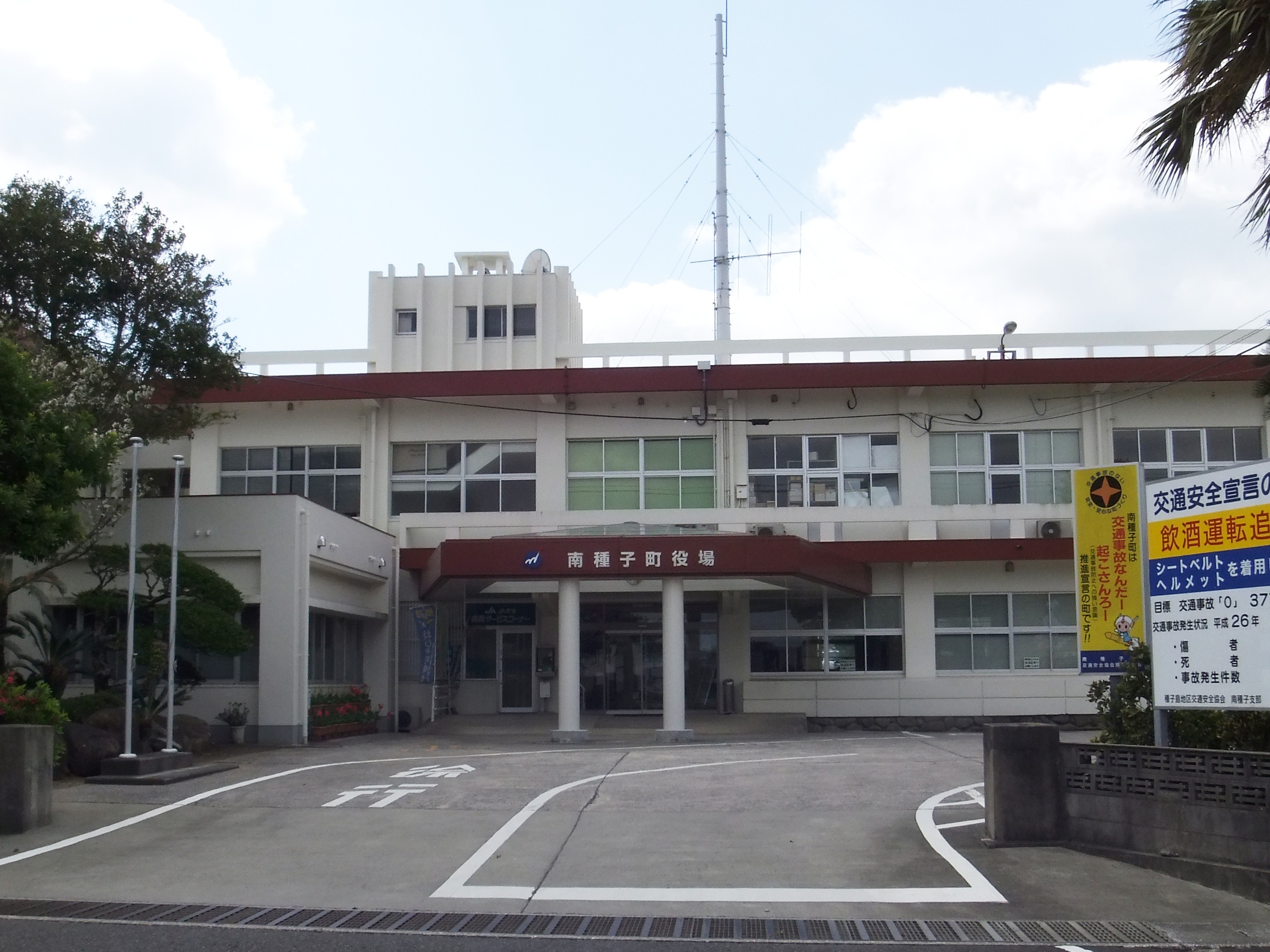
Minamitane Town Office

Minamitane (南種子町, Minamitane-chō) is a town located on the island of Tanegashima, in Kumage District, Kagoshima Prefecture, Japan. As of 30 April 2024, the town had an estimated population of 5,249 in 2893 households, and a population density of 48 persons per km^{2}. The total area of the town is 109.94 km^{2} (42.45 sq mi). The main spaceport of the Japan Aerospace Exploration Agency is located at the Tanegashima Space Center in Minamitane.

== Geography ==
Minamitane is located on the southern end of the island of Tanegashima, bordered by the East China Sea to the west and the Pacific Ocean to the east, and the town of Nakatane to the north.

=== Climate ===
The climate is classified as humid subtropical (Köppen climate classification Cfa) with very warm summers and mild winters. Precipitation is high throughout the year, but is highest in the months of May, June and September. The area is subject to frequent typhoons.

Climate data for Minamitane (1991−2020 normals, extremes 1977−present)
Month	Jan	Feb	Mar	Apr	May	Jun	Jul	Aug	Sep	Oct	Nov	Dec	Year
Record high °C (°F)	23.3 (73.9)	25.4 (77.7)	25.7 (78.3)	27.8 (82.0)	31.1 (88.0)	33.1 (91.6)	34.5 (94.1)	35.0 (95.0)	34.3 (93.7)	30.7 (87.3)	27.6 (81.7)	25.0 (77.0)	35.0 (95.0)
Mean daily maximum °C (°F)	13.6 (56.5)	14.5 (58.1)	17.1 (62.8)	20.7 (69.3)	23.9 (75.0)	26.1 (79.0)	30.0 (86.0)	30.7 (87.3)	28.5 (83.3)	24.6 (76.3)	20.4 (68.7)	15.9 (60.6)	22.2 (71.9)
Daily mean °C (°F)	10.7 (51.3)	11.3 (52.3)	13.6 (56.5)	17.0 (62.6)	20.3 (68.5)	23.1 (73.6)	26.5 (79.7)	26.9 (80.4)	24.9 (76.8)	21.3 (70.3)	17.2 (63.0)	12.8 (55.0)	18.8 (65.8)
Mean daily minimum °C (°F)	8.2 (46.8)	8.6 (47.5)	10.8 (51.4)	14.2 (57.6)	17.5 (63.5)	20.8 (69.4)	24.2 (75.6)	24.7 (76.5)	22.7 (72.9)	19.0 (66.2)	14.7 (58.5)	10.2 (50.4)	16.3 (61.4)
Record low °C (°F)	−0.3 (31.5)	−1.6 (29.1)	0.4 (32.7)	5.9 (42.6)	10.9 (51.6)	13.2 (55.8)	17.1 (62.8)	20.2 (68.4)	15.7 (60.3)	10.6 (51.1)	3.9 (39.0)	0.9 (33.6)	−1.6 (29.1)
Average precipitation mm (inches)	159.2 (6.27)	164.4 (6.47)	224.5 (8.84)	264.5 (10.41)	318.5 (12.54)	653.6 (25.73)	300.1 (11.81)	184.5 (7.26)	298.2 (11.74)	218.4 (8.60)	178.7 (7.04)	145.5 (5.73)	3,137.9 (123.54)
Average precipitation days (≥ 1.0 mm)	13.7	12.5	14.3	12.1	13.0	18.3	10.5	11.6	12.5	10.7	10.5	12.4	152.1
Mean monthly sunshine hours	94.2	99.9	131.3	152.2	150.6	97.5	192.7	205.9	146.9	147.3	121.3	101.3	1,644
Source: Japan Meteorological Agency

=== Demographics ===
Per Japanese census data, the population of Minamitane is as shown below:

Historical population
Year	Pop.	±%
1920	7,757	—
1930	7,989	+3.0%
1940	7,946	−0.5%
1950	11,856	+49.2%
1960	12,566	+6.0%
1970	9,923	−21.0%
1980	8,320	−16.2%
1990	7,672	−7.8%
2000	7,154	−6.8%
2010	6,218	−13.1%
2020	5,445	−12.4%

== History ==
The area of Minamitane was part of ancient Ōsumi Province. During the Edo Period, the area was part of the holdings of Satsuma Domain. Minamitane Village was established on April 1, 1889. In 1879, a government office (役場) was established in the village of Shimama (島間村), also overseeing the villages of Nishino (西之村) and Sakai (坂井村), while another government office was established in Kukinaga (茎永村), also covering the villages of Hirayama (平山村) and Nakano (中之村). These former villages were then merged to form Minamitane Village. Minamitane was upgraded to town status on October 15, 1956.

== Government ==
Minamitane has a mayor-council form of government with a directly elected mayor and a unicameral town council of 10 members. Minamitane, collectively with the other municipalities of Kumage District and the city of Nishinoomote, contributes two members to the Kagoshima Prefectural Assembly. In terms of national politics, the town is part of the Kagoshima 4th district of the lower house of the Diet of Japan.

== Economy ==
The economy of Minamitane is based largely on agriculture and commercial fishing.

== Education ==
Minamitane has eight public elementary high schools and one public junior high school operated by the town government. The town does not have a high school.

== Transportation ==
=== Highways ===
- National Route 58

== Notable people ==
The Mangjeol family of South Korea trace their ancestry to a man from Shimama Village surnamed Amikiri (網切) who went to Korea during the colonial period and settled there. His son married a Korean woman, and his grandson Amikiri Ichirō (網切一郎) chose to remain in South Korea after its independence and naturalised as a South Korean citizen, and changed his name to the Korean reading of its characters, Mangjeol Ilrang.
