= Ōsumi Province =

Former province of Japan

Ōsumi Province 大隅国
- Province of Japan
- 713–1871
- Map of Japanese provinces (1868) with Ōsumi Province highlighted in red, the Saikaidō in green
- Capital: Kokubu, Kagoshima
- History
  - Established: 713
  - Disestablished: 1871
- Today part of: Kagoshima Prefecture

Ōsumi Province (大隅国, Ōsumi no Kuni (Note: Japanese pronunciation: [ó̞ò̞.sɨ̀.mʲì (nò̞ kɯ̈̀.ɲ̟ì), ò̞ó̞.sɨ́.mʲí (nó̞ kɯ̈́.ɲ̟í), ó̞ó̞.sɨ́.mʲí (nó̞ kɯ̈́.ɲ̟í)])) was a province of Japan in the area of southeastern Kyushu, corresponding to the eastern half of modern Kagoshima Prefecture, and including the Ōsumi Islands . Ōsumi bordered on Hyūga to the northeast, and Satsuma Province to the northwest. Its abbreviated form was Gūshū (隅州). In terms of the Gokishichidō system, Ōsumi was one of the provinces of the Saikaidō circuit. Under the Engishiki classification system, Ōsumi was ranked as one of the "middle countries" (中国) in terms of importance, and one of the "far countries" (遠国) in terms of distance from the capital.

The Ōsumi region has developed its own distinct local dialect. Although Ōsumi is part of Kagoshima Prefecture today, this dialect is different from that spoken in the city of Kagoshima. There is a notable cultural pride in traditional poetry written in Ōsumi and Kagoshima dialects.

Japan's first satellite, Ōsumi, was named after the province.

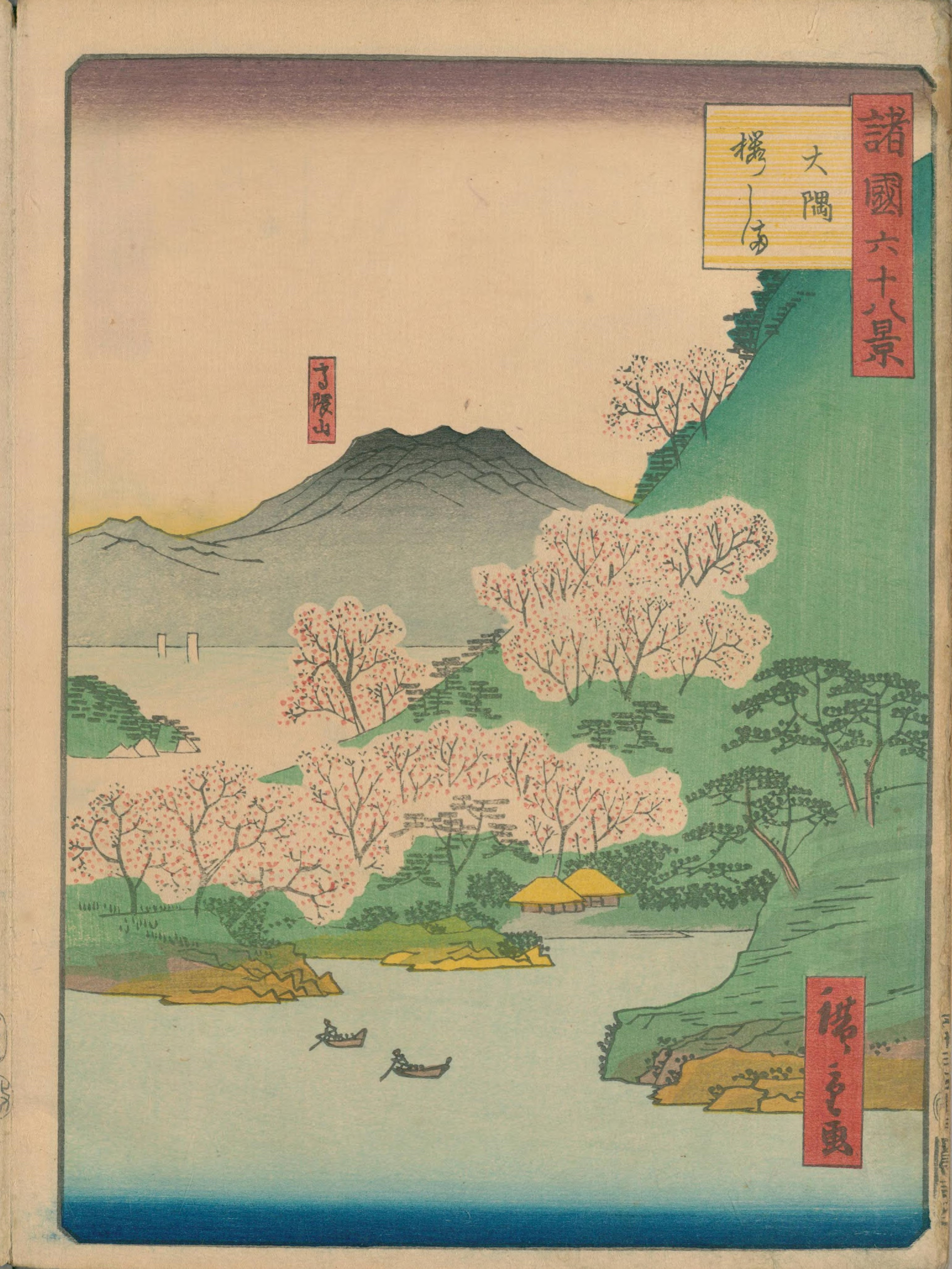
Hiroshige ukiyo-e "Bungo" in "The Famous Scenes of the Sixty States" (六十余州名所図会), depicting Sakurajima in 1856

== History ==
=== Early history ===
Before the establishment of the Ritsuryō system in 701, Ōsumi was a stronghold of the Kumaso people, a Japonic speaking or possibly Austronesian tribe which was conquered (per the Kojiki and Nihon Shoki) by the legendary general Yamato Takeru during the late Kofun period. Their land was called Sokuni or Sonokuni (襲国). However, the area was very much a frontier region and was ruled as part of Hyūga Province. During the Asuka and early Nara period, resistance to Yamato rule by the Hayato people (who may or may not have been the same as the Kumaso) persisted, and many Hayato were forced from their homes in Buzen and northern Hyūga to resettle in Ōsumi, which was separated from Hyūga in 713 to become a separate province. The Hayato fought back in 720 with the Hayato Rebellion, but were defeated in 721 by an army led by Ōtomo no Tabito. The Handen-Shūju system was implemented in their lands in 800. The population of Yamato immigrants in Kagoshima Prefecture in the early 8th century has been estimated at around 9,000 people and one-seventh of the total population. By this estimate, the Hayato population of the time can be calculated as consisting of around 54,000 people. Many were made to emigrate to the Kinai region, and were active in the protection of the court, the arts, sumo, and bamboo work. In 824, Tane Province was abolished and added to Ōsumi.

The kokufu of the province was established in what is now the Kokubu neighborhood of the city of Kirishima, although its ruins have not bee positively identified. However, the ruins of the Ōsumi Kokubun-ji, which must have been located in the vicinity, are known. The ichinomiya of the province is the Kagoshima Shrine, also known as the Ōsumi Shō-Hachimangū .

In the Heian period, the province was subject to occasional raids by tribes from the south, possibly the Ryukyu Islands or Taiwan. It was also involved in conflicts with officials from the central government at Dazaifu. In 1007 the provincial governor Kanno Shigetada was killed by a Dazaifu official, and in 1029, Taira Kimoto, a Dazaifu magistrate and ruler of the Shimazu shōen burned down the Ōsumi kokufu. The Shimazu shōen used these conflicts to take control of trade with the southern islands and also to annex territory within Ōsumi. They were opposed by the Shō-Hachimangū, which had become a great landowner in its own right, and was involved in constant conflicts with the Usa Hachiman-gū over both secular and religious matters. Thus, from the late Heian through the Kamakura and Muromachi periods, the province was divided between control by the Shimazu clan and minor warlords connected with the Shō-Hachimangū. In the Sengoku period, the Shimazu clan gradually conquered the remainder of the province.

=== Edo Period and early modern period ===
Ōsumi was completely under the control of the Shimazu clan of Satsuma Domain throughout the Edo period. With the abolition of the han system on August 29, 1871, Ōsumi became part of Kagoshima Prefecture. In 1879, the Amami Islands became part of Ōshima District, Kagoshima and were considered to be part of former Ōsumi Province. On April 1, 1891 Higashihitsugi District and Minamori District of former Hyuga Province were added to former Ōsumi Province, along with the Tokara Islands, which were formerly part of Satsuma Province. However, the current Mishima Village and Toshima Village areas were transferred to Kagoshima District in 1973, returning to former Satsuma Province, although the old provincial name has long since become obsolete.

Bakumatsu period domains
Name	Clan	Type	kokudaka
Satsuma	Shimazu	Tozama	262,168 koku

Per the early Meiji period Kyudaka kyuryo Torishirabe-chō (旧高旧領取調帳), an official government assessment of the nation's resources, Ōsumi Province had 248 villages with a total kokudaka of 262,168 koku. Ōsumi Province consisted of:

Districts of Ōsumi Province
District	kokudaka	villages	Notes
Aira District (姶良郡)	41,705 koku	38 villages	absorbed Kuwabara and Nishisoo Districts on March 29, 1896
Kumage District (熊毛郡)	9,808 koku	15 villages	absorbed Gomu District on March 29, 1896
Kimotsuki District (肝属郡)	64,385 koku	41 villages	absorbed Minamiōsumi District on March 29, 1896
Hishikari District (菱刈郡)	16,937 koku	13 villages	merged with Kitaisa District (北伊佐郡) of Satsuma Province to become the 2nd incarnation of Isa District (伊佐郡) on March 29, 1896
Kuwabara District (桑原郡)	24,990 koku	25 villages	merged into Aira District (along with Nishisoo District) on March 29, 1896
Ōsumi District (大隅郡)	29,397 koku	43 villages	Kitaōsumi District (北大隅郡) - merged into Kagoshima District (鹿児島郡) of Satsuma Province and Minamiōsumi District (南大隅郡) - merged into Kimotsuki District on March 29, 1896
Soo District (囎唹郡)	72,544 koku	53 villages	Higashisoo District (東囎唹郡) - merged with Minamimorokata District (南諸県郡) (formerly from Miyazaki Prefecture) to become the 2nd incarnation of Soo District on March 29, 1896; Nishisoo District (西囎唹郡) - was merged into Aira District on March 29, 1896
Gomu District (馭謨郡)	1398 koku	20 villages	merged into Kumage District on March 29, 1896

== Gallery ==
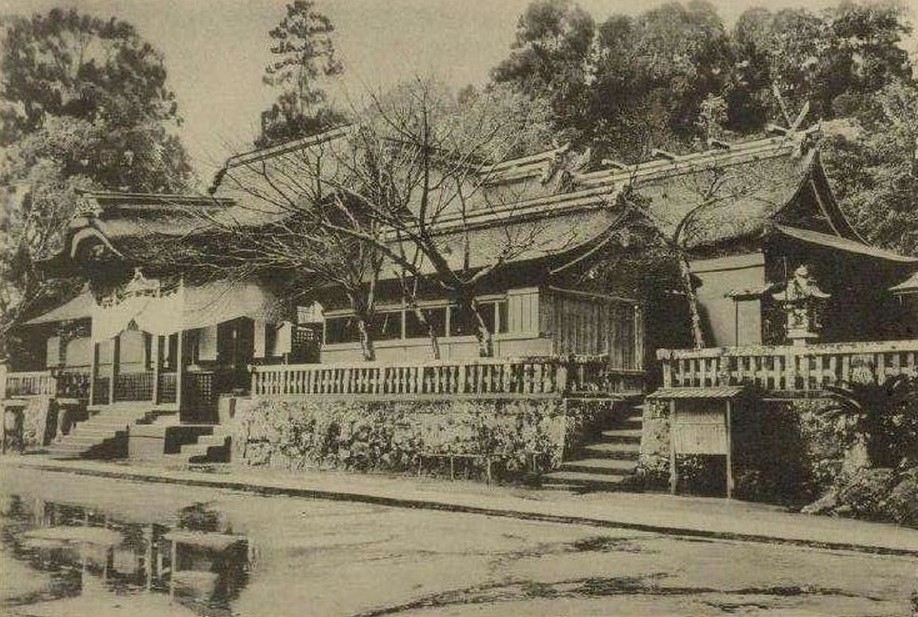
Kagoshima Shrine, the ichinomiya of the province

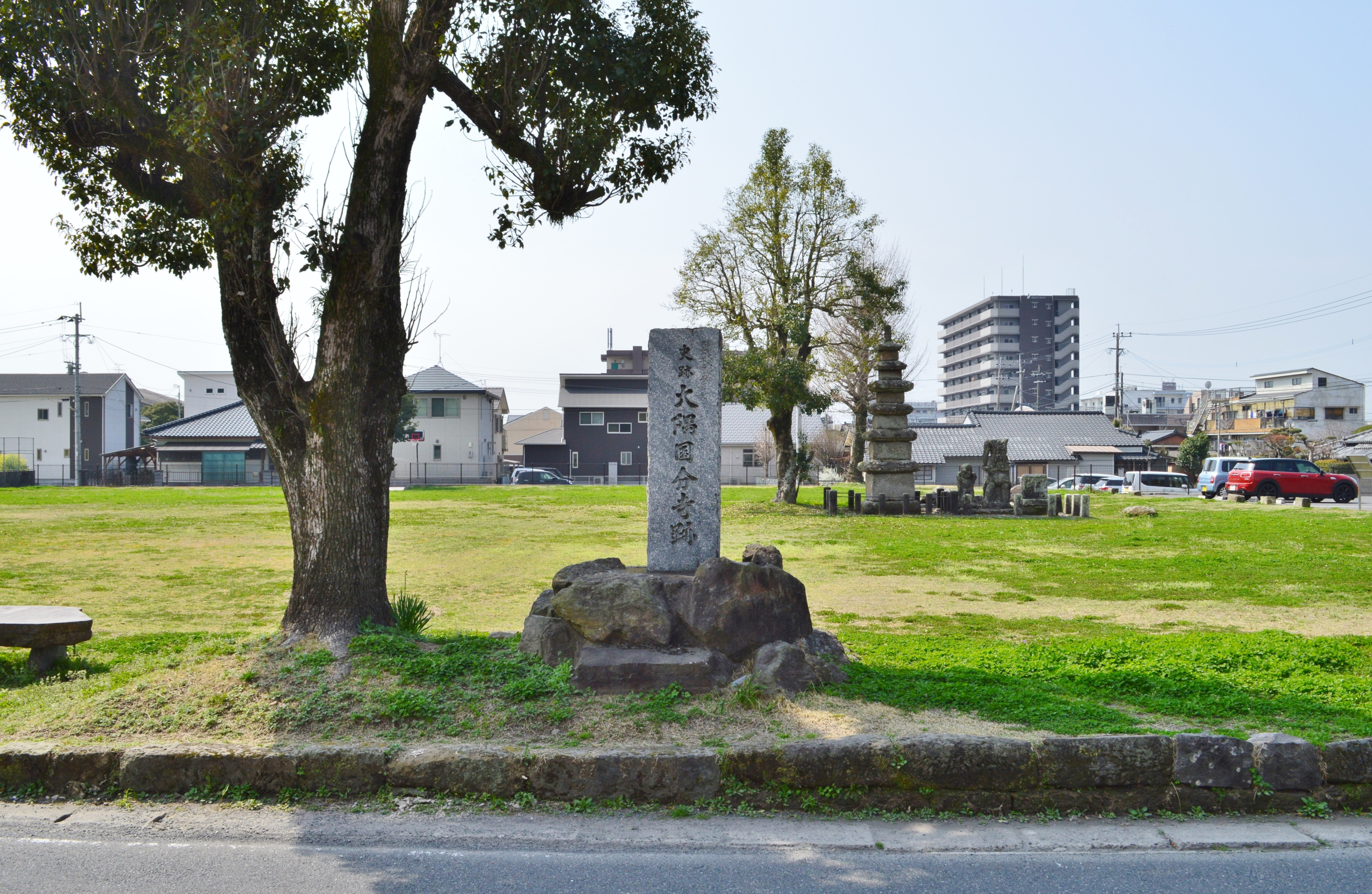
Ōsumi Kokubun-ji ruins

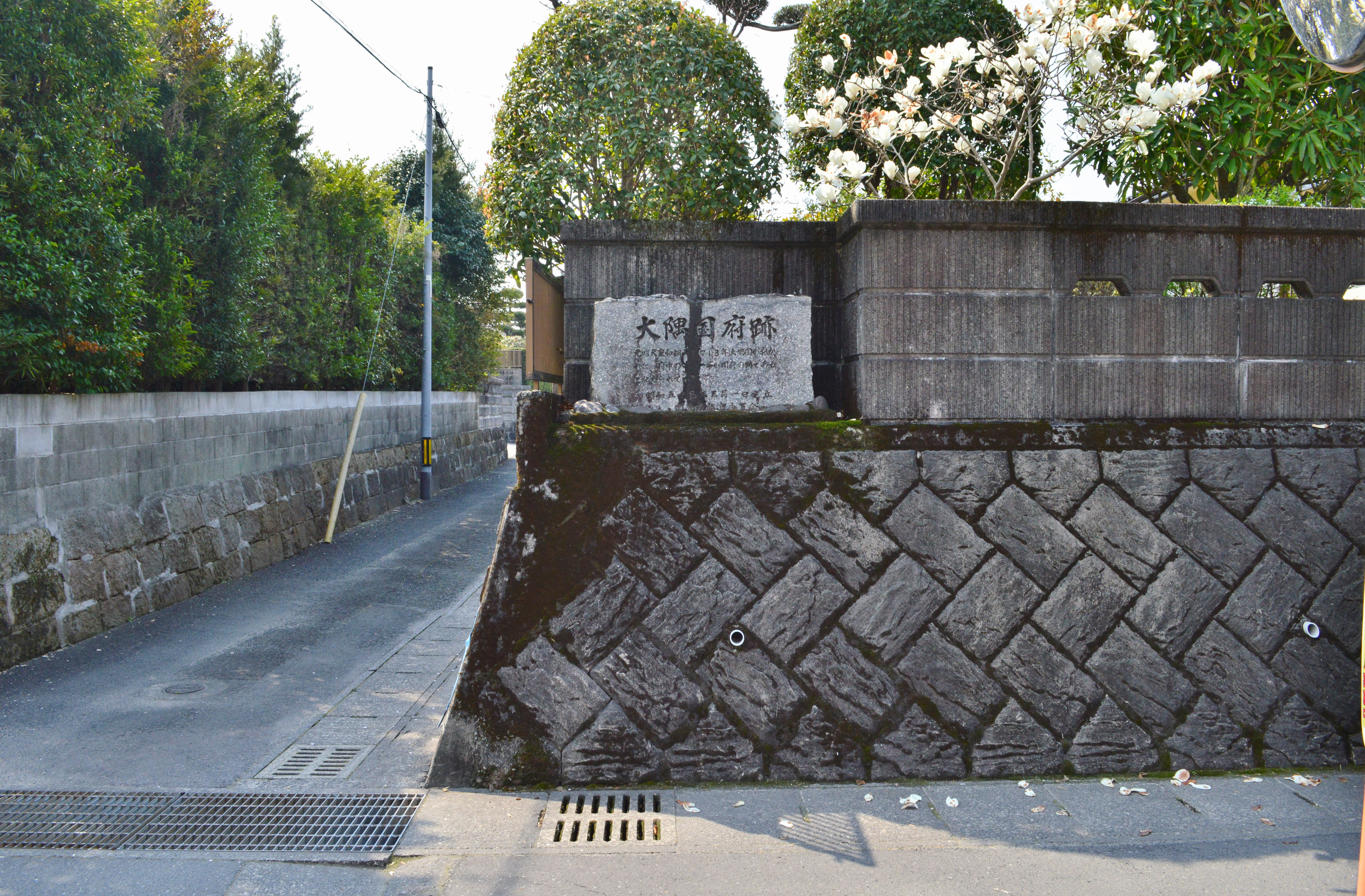
Ōsumi Kokufu site

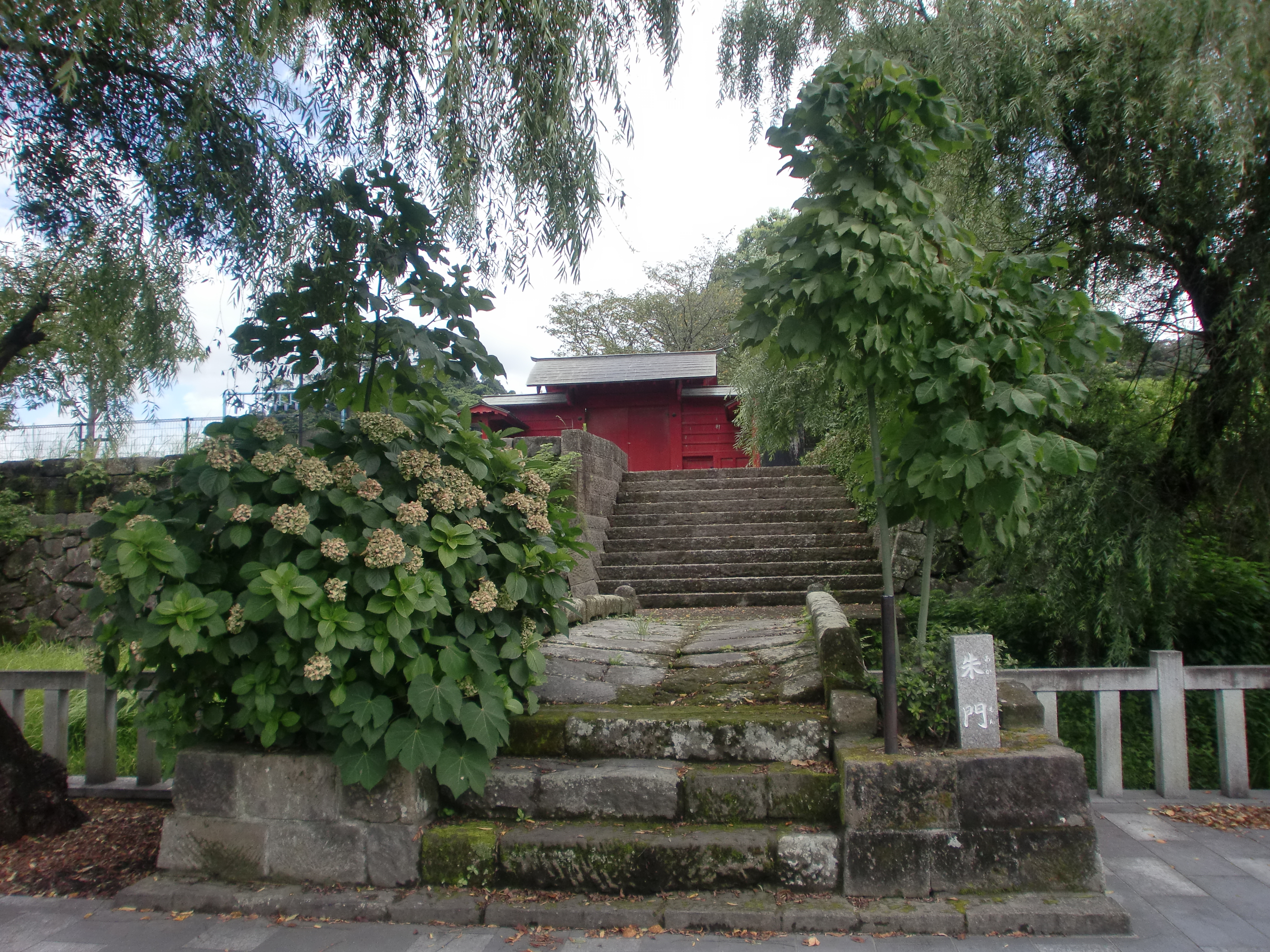
Ruins of Kokubu Castle

== Bibliography ==
- Nussbaum, Louis-Frédéric and Käthe Roth. (2005). Japan encyclopedia. Cambridge: Harvard University Press. ISBN 978-0-674-01753-5; OCLC 58053128
- Papinot, Edmond. (1910). Historical and Geographic Dictionary of Japan. Tokyo: Librarie Sansaisha. OCLC 77691250
