= Hayato rebellion =

720–721 rebellion in Kyushu against the imperial dynasty of Japan

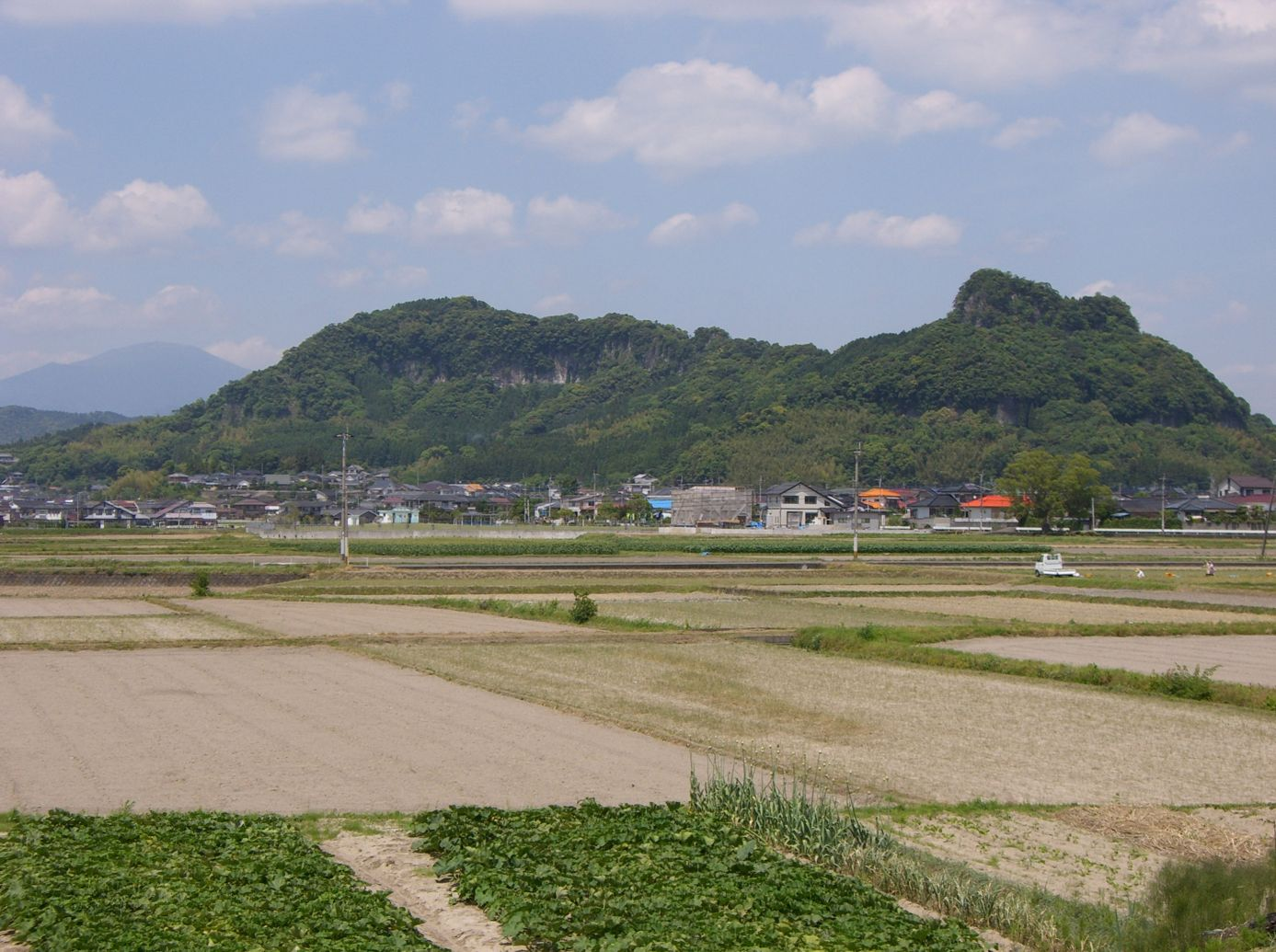
- The location of Himeki castle in Kirishima, Kagoshima
Date	720–721
Location	Ōsumi Province, Japan
Result	Imperial dynasty victory

Belligerents
Yamato	Hayato

Commanders and leaders
Empress Genshō; Ōtomo no Tabito; Kasa no Mimuro; Kose no Mahito	Unknown

Strength
Over 10,000	Several thousand

Casualties and losses
Unknown	1,400

The Hayato rebellion (隼人の反乱, Hayato no hanran) (720–721) was a rebellion of the Hayato of southern Kyushu against the imperial dynasty of Japan during the Nara period. After a year and a half of fighting, the Hayato were defeated, and the Imperial court established its rule over southern Kyushu.

== Background ==
In the latter half of the 7th century, the imperial court's influence extended to southern Kyushu, but the scattered Kumaso and Hayato populations held their ground. The court was attempting to introduce its own Ritsuryō system throughout its sphere of influence, but the populations of southern Kyushu resisted. This was because Ritsuryō was based on rice cultivation, to which the volcanic soil of southern Kyushu was unsuited.

On the other hand, the court was also expanding its intercourse with mainland China through the Ryukyu Islands. It organized an investigative expedition called the bekkokushi (覓国使) to survey southern Kyushu and the Ryukyu Islands, but in 700 the bekkokushi were threatened by the local inhabitants in various parts of southern Kyushu.

The court gathered weapons in Dazaifu, and in 702 dispatched troops to southern Kyushu. At the same time, they established the future Satsuma Province there and strengthened the local governmental structure. In 713, Ōsumi Province was established, and 5,000 inhabitants of Buzen Province, where Ritsuryō had already been implemented, were sent to live there and guide the further adoption of Ritsuryō. Tensions rose as the court continued to press Ritsuryō, and especially the Handen-Shūju system, on the Hayato population, who practiced communal land use.

== Rebellion ==
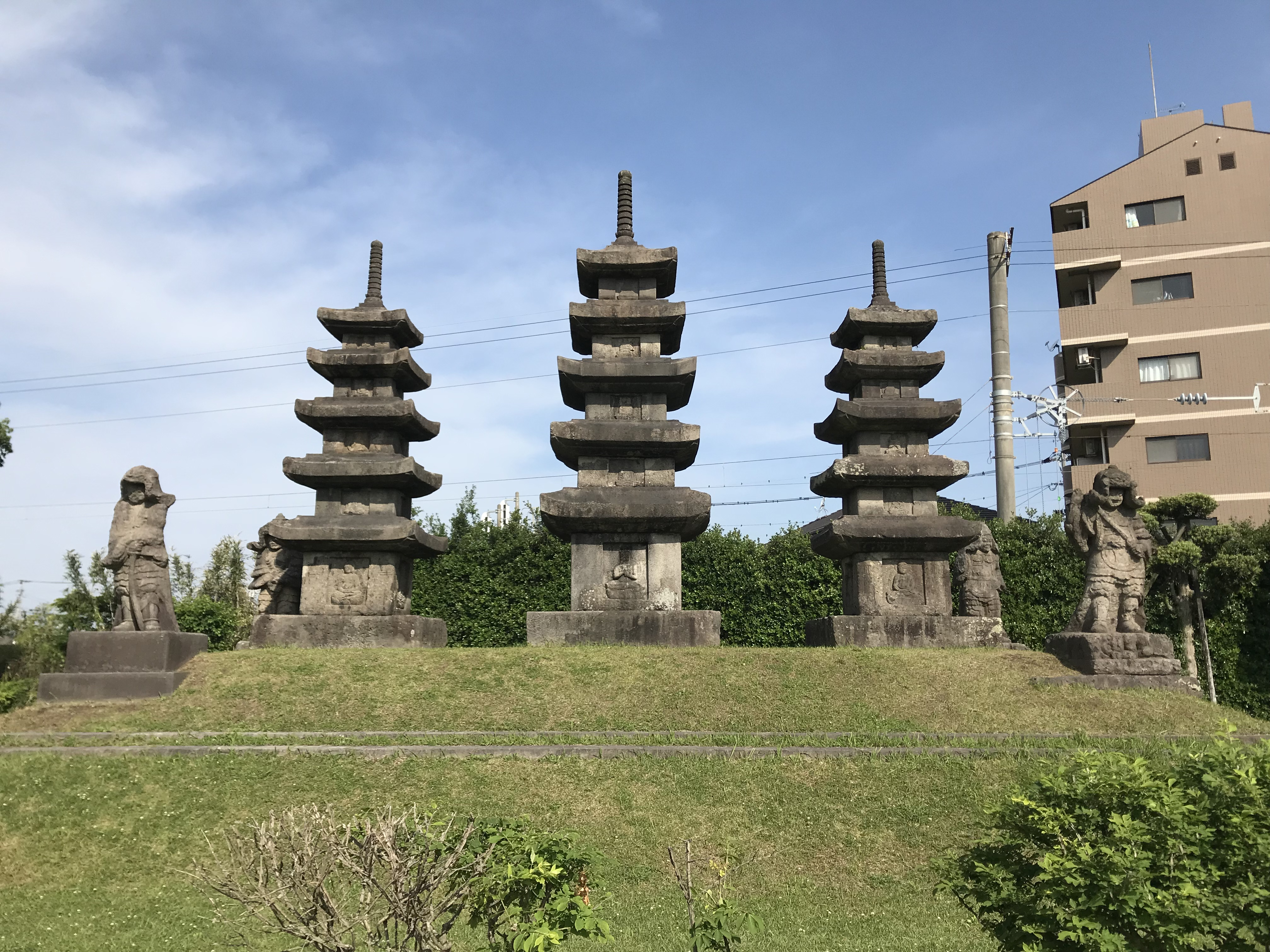
The Hayatozuka ruins, which are said to have been built in 720 to console the spirits of those who died in the Hayato Rebellion

Early in the year 720, the imperial court received notice from Dazaifu that Yako no Fuhitomaro (陽候史麻呂), the governor of Ōsumi Province, had been killed. Within a week, the court appointed Ōtomo no Tabito as great general to subdue the Hayato (征隼人持節大将軍), with Kasa no Mimuro (笠御室) and Kose no Mahito (巨勢真人) as his vice-generals, and sent them to war.

The Hayato side gathered several thousand troops and holed up in seven castles. In response, the court gathered over ten thousand troops from the various regions of Kyushu and divided them into a two-pronged attack, advancing from the east and the west. Three months after the attack was launched, they reported the defeat of five of the castles. However, they met with unexpected difficulty at the remaining two fortresses, Soonoiwaki (曽於乃石城) and Himenoki (比売之城). The war drew on, and after another two months, Ōtomo returned to the capital, leaving his vice-generals in charge.

After almost a year and a half of fighting, the war ended in the Hayatos' defeat. In mid-721, the vice-generals returned to the capital with Hayato prisoners of war. Between those killed and taken prisoner, the Shoku Nihongi records Hayato casualties totaling 1,400 people. Due to the rebellion, the enforcement of Handen-Shūju was postponed. It was finally implemented in 800, almost eighty years after the war.

The population of the Yamato people in Kyushu increased. The Hayato eventually assimilated into Japanese society and many of them also moved to the main island of Honshū, especially the Kinai region, where they were active in the protection of the court, the arts, sumo, and bamboo work. Many lived in Yamashiro Province, in the south of modern Kyoto. There remains an area called Ōsumi (大住) in Kyōtanabe, Kyoto, where many Ōsumi Hayato lived. These were the Hayato governed by the Hayato-shi, appointed by the Imperial dynasty.
