= Hayatozuka =

- 隼人塚 (Japanese)
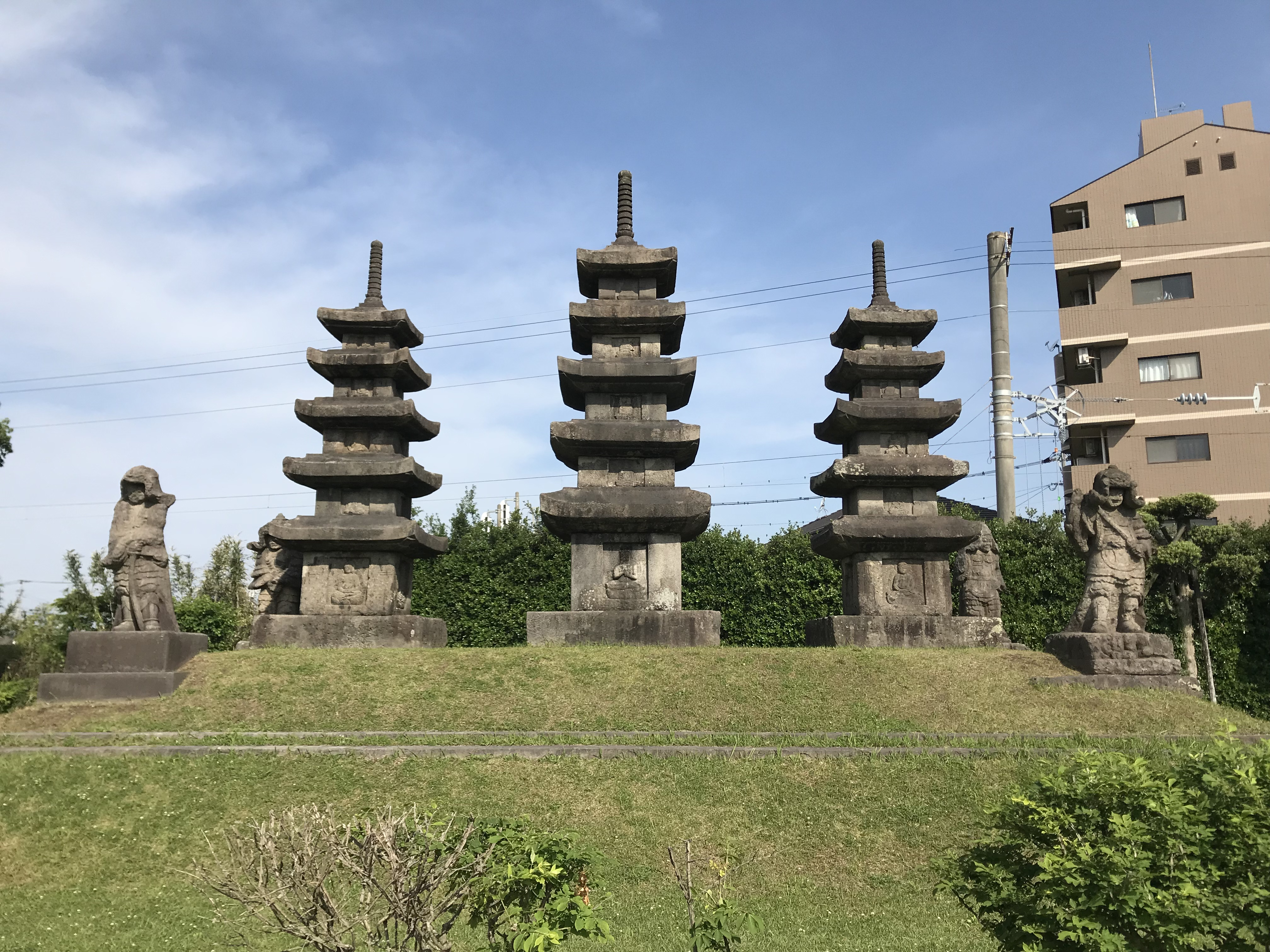
- Hayatozuka

- Hayatozuka Hayatozuka (Japan)
- Interactive map of Hayatozuka
- 31°44′26.6″N 130°44′12.61″E
- Type: Buddhist relics
- Periods: c.Heian period
- Location: Kirishima, Kagoshima, Japan
- Region: Kyushu

Site notes
- Condition: Archaeological park
- Public access: Yes (park, museum)

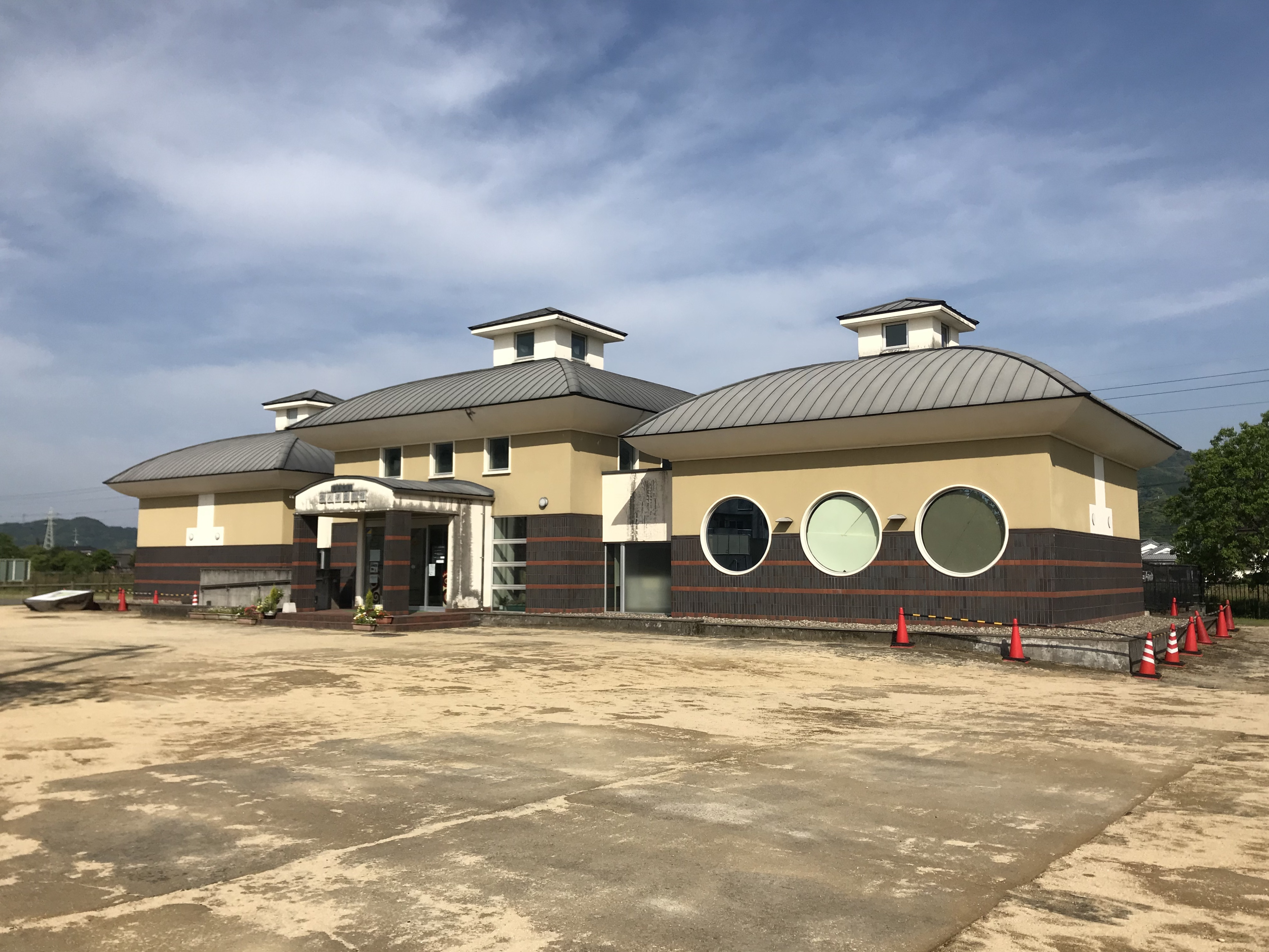
Hayatozuka Historic Site Museum

Hayatozuka (隼人塚) is a Buddhist-related ruin located in located in the Uchiyamada, Hayato neighborhood of the city of Kirishima, Kagoshima, Japan. It was designated as a National Historic Site in 1921.

== Overview ==
The Hayatozuka consists of three five-storied stone pagodas standing on top of a two-meter-high hill, and four stone statues of the Four Heavenly Kings standing around them. In the past, all of the stone pagodas were broken, and two of the statues stood at a distance from the mound, half-buried. The stone pagoda in the center is 6.6 meters high, and the two on either side are approximately 5.5 to 5.6 meters high. The missing stones were unearthed during archaeological excavations but when the pagodas were reconstructed, the sōrin at the top was not found, and it was reconstructed based on similar stone pagodas in western Japan. Regarding the Four Heavenly Kings statues, the statue of Jikokuten had been standing before the restoration. The statue of Zōjōten had been removed in the latter half of the Meiji period but was returned in 1915, and the statues of Kōmokuten and Tamonten had been buried separately.

The origins of this monument are unknown and subject to considerable speculation. There are four main theories:

1. Wadō Year 1 theory - Per the "Kuwahata Family Documents" at the Ōsumi Shō-Hachimangū, dated 1737, the monument was built in 708 to quell the curse of the Kumaso, the original inhabitants of southern Kyushu who had been conquered by Yamato Takeru.

2. The Yōrō Year 4 theory - This was a monument built to console the spirits of those who died during the Hayato Rebellion in 720.

3. Shōkoku-ji Temple Ruins theory - This was the site of nunnery called Shōkoku-ji, which was descendent from the Ōsumi Kokubun-ji

4. Haibutsu kishaku theory - That this is a collection of relics from sites destroyed in the anti-Buddhism movement of the early Meiji period. The justification for this theory is that Edo period travel guides describe two stone pagodas and a stone statue located near present-day Hayato Station which no longer exist, but make no mention of this monument.

However, as a result of archaeological excavation, no remains of a temple could be confirmed, but a double stone wall surrounding the mound was discovered. Furthermore, since the base of the stone pagodas was excavated on top of the mound, the theory that these monuments were relocated from another location has been largely ruled out. Furthermore, a stone Buddha with an inscription dated 1142 as the "Old Shokokuji Ruins Stone Buddha" (held by the Hayatozuka Historic Site Museum, a tangible cultural property designated by Kagoshima Prefecture) was discovered, so the prevailing theory is that Hayatozuka was built during the Heian period. The name "Hayatozuka" was coined by Kuwahata Kimiyuki, the kannushi of Kagoshima Shrine in 1903. Previous to this, it had been called "Gunjinzuka" or "Shogunzuka", or "Kumasozuka", etc.

Currently, the entire area has been developed as a park, and the Hayatozuka Historic Site Museum (隼人塚史跡館) is located here. The site is about a 10-minutes walk from Hayato Station on the JR Kyushu Nippō Main Line.

== See also ==
- List of Historic Sites of Japan (Kagoshima)
