= Makizono, Kagoshima =

Dissolved municipality in Kagoshima prefecture, Japan

Makizono (牧園町, Makizono-chō) was a town located in Aira District, Kagoshima Prefecture, Japan.

As of June 1, 2005, the town had an estimated population of 9,041 (4,202 men and 4,839 women) and the density of 71.27 persons per km^{2}. The total area was 129.66 km^{2}.

On November 7, 2005, Makizono, along the city of Kokubu, with the towns of Kirishima (former), Fukuyama, Hayato, Mizobe and Yokogawa (all from Aira District), was merged to create the city of Kirishima and no longer exists as an independent municipality.

Some of the first inhabitants of this area were the Kumaso people of the early Jōmon period. Archeological digs in the Manzen district have revealed ancient artifacts most likely used by the Kumaso. Kumaso no Ana in the neighboring town of Hayato (now also part of Kirishima) is a cave thought to have been used by the Kumaso.

The earliest recorded name of Makizono, is Inazumi-go. In Japanese "ina" refers to rice and "zumi" means a vast collection, or a pile. "Go" means village or hamlet. In other words, the area was known for its bountiful rice harvests.

Later texts from the Tokugawa period name the area that is now Makizono, Odori-go. "Odori" is the Japanese word for dancing, and it is said that this name was given to the town by visitors who noted the jovial nature of the local residents. While you rarely see mention of these former names in the current town, the hot spring inn located in the Shukukubota district, Iwaibashi Onsen Inn, has the characters for Odori-go written in large print on the side of their hot spring facilities.
