= Kagoshima Shrine =

Shinto shrine in Kirishima, Japan

Kagoshima-jingū 鹿児島神宮
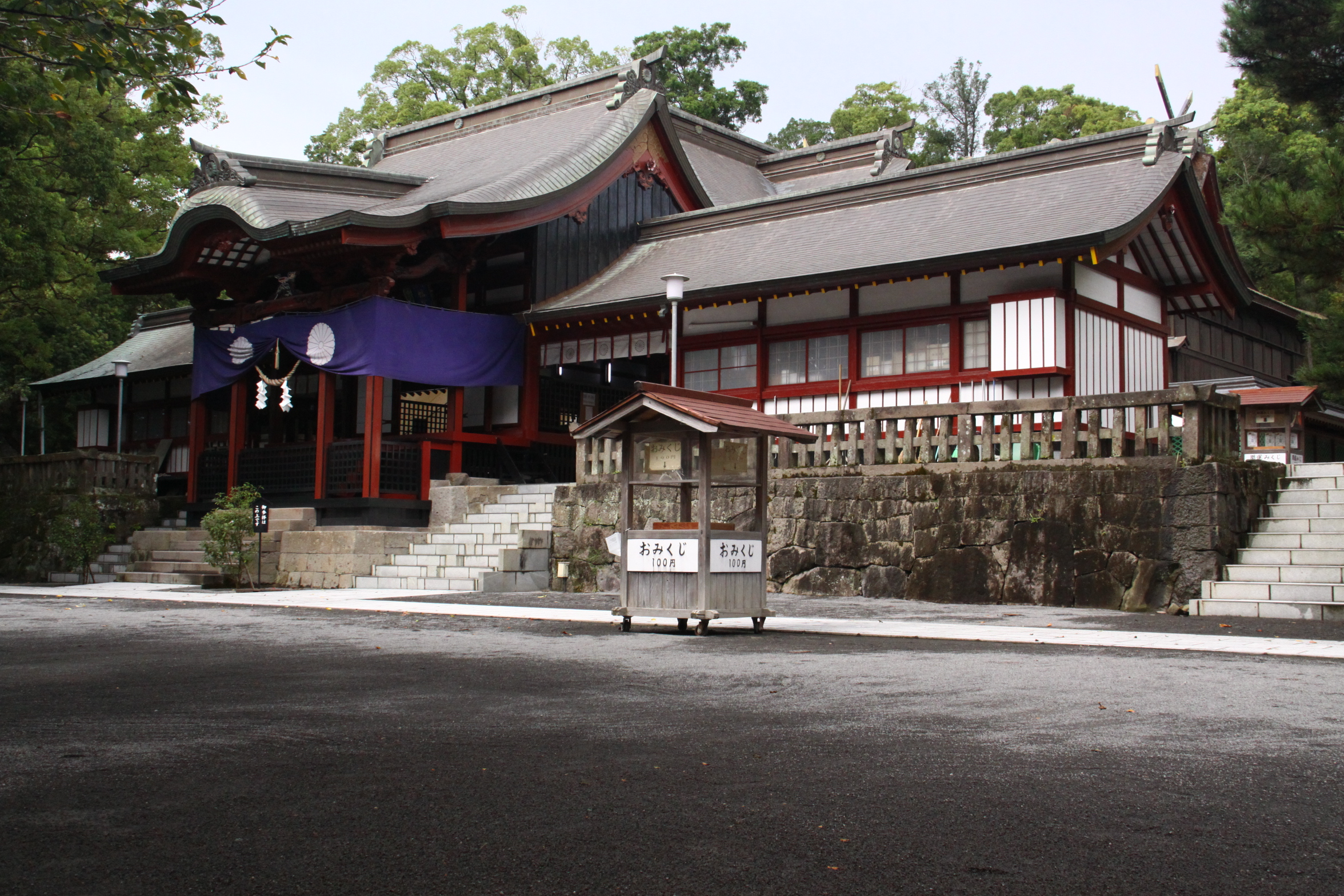
- Imperial Messenger's Hall (ICP)

- Kagoshima-jingū Kagoshima Shrine (Japan)

Religion
- Affiliation: Shinto
- Deity: Hoori; Toyotama-hime; Emperor Chūai; Emperor Ōjin; Empress Jingū
- Festival: August 15 (lunar)
- Type: Hachiman

Location
- Location: 2496, Hayato-chō Uchi, Kirishima-shi, Kagoshima-ken 899-5116
- Interactive map of Kagoshima-jingū 鹿児島神宮
- Coordinates: 31°45′13.37″N 130°44′16.3″E

Architecture
- Style: irimoya-zukuri

Kagoshima Shrine (鹿児島神宮, Kagoshima-jingū) is a Shinto shrine located in the Hayatomachi-uchi neighborhood of the city of Kirishima, Kagoshima prefecture, Japan. It is the ichinomiya of former Ōsumi Province. The main festival of the shrine are held annually on August 15 by the lunar calendar. Historically it was also known by the names Ōsumi Shō-Hachiman-gū (大隅正八幡宮) and Kokubu Hachiman-gū (国分八幡宮). The shrine precincts was designated as a National Historic Site in 1972.

== Enshrined Kami ==
The kami enshrined at Kagoshima-jingū are:

Main shrine

- Hikohohodemi no Mikoto (天津日高彦火火出見尊), son of Ninigi-no-Mikoto and Konohanasakuya-hime
- Toyotama-hime (豊玉比売命), wife of Hoori, paternal grandmother of Emperor Jimmu

Subsidiary shrines

- Emperor Chūai (帯中比子尊)
- Empress Jingū (息長帯比売命) - Wife of Emperor Chūai.
- Emperor Ōjin (品陀和気尊)
- Nakatsuhime (中比売命) - Wife of Emperor Ōjin.

== History ==
According to the shrine's legend, the Kagoshima Jingū during the Age of the Gods, as Takachiho Palace, the residence of Hikohohodemi no Mikoto (彦火火出見尊), the third and youngest son of Ninigi-no-Mikoto and Konohanasakuya-hime and ancestor of Emperor Jimmu. It was moved to its current location in 708, and Setsusha Sekitai-gu (Ishitai Shrine) is currently located on the former site. Takaya-no-yamanoe misasagi, said to be the mausoleum of Hikohohodemi no Mikoto, is located 13 kilometers northwest of the shrine.

It is also said that this former shrine is where the Hachiman deity appeared in the fifth year of Emperor Kinmei's reign (544), which is why the shrine was called the Sho-Hachiman-gū, or "true Hachiman shrine". Per the Hachiman Godokun (八幡愚童訓), when Ōhirume, the daughter of the great king of Chen, was seven years old, the light of the morning sun pierced her chest, and she became pregnant. The prince was born, and the royal subjects, suspicious of him, put him on an empty ship and set it afloat on the ocean, hoping to claim the area where the ship was located as their territory. The prince landed in Ōsumi and was named "Hachiman" by Emperor Keitai, although some other accounts state that the princess was on the ship, and gave birth after his arrived in Ōsumi. Per the Konjaku Monogatari, Hachiman later relocated to Usa and eventually to Iwashimizu. For centuries there was a rivalry between Usa Hachimangū and Kagoshima Jingū over which one had the legitimate deity, and Usa Hachimangū secretly sent messengers to Kagoshima sent 15 (or even 14) messengers to burn down Kagoshima Jingū. As that happened, the character for "Shō-Hachiman(正八幡)" appeared in the black smoke rising from the burning shrine. These messengers were so frightened that they fled to Mizobe, where they were punished by the gods and 13 died one after another. The local people then took pity on those who had died, and built mounds at the places where they had fallen. These mounds are located in the northern part of the Kokubu Plain. The Jusanzukabara (Thirteen Mounds) Historic Site Park derives its name from this legend and is located in the northeastern part of the area, near Kagoshima Airport.

The first mention of the shrine in reliable historical records is in the Engishiki, compiled during the reign of Emperor Daigo, which lists it as the only Shikinai Taisha in southern Kyushu (Hyuga, Osumi, and Satsuma). During the Kenkyū era (1190 - 1199), the shrine's territory was over 2,500 chō, and it held estates with 1,000 koku until the end of the Edo period. The shrine was patronized by the Shimazu clan of Satsuma Domain from the Sengoku period.

In 1871, under the Meiji government's State Shinto ranked Shinto shrines, the Kagoshima Jingū was initially ranked as an National shrine, 2nd rank (国幣中社, Kokuhei Chūsha). It was promoted to an Imperial shrine, 2nd rank (官幣中社, Kanpei Chūsha) in 1874 and to an Imperial shrine, 1st rank (官幣大社, Kanpei Taisha) in 1895. After the war, the shrine became a part of the Association of Shinto Shrines.

Archaeological excavations have been carried out since 1994. Within the current precincts a large number of shards of Chinese and Thai ceramics from the 14th to the first half of the 15th century have been found, indicating that the shrine was involved in overseas trade with mainland Asia from the Kamakura period to the Muromachi period.

The National Historic Site designation also includes the sites of four houses of the hereditary priesthood of the shrine. Each of these sites was a fortified mansion, with wide and deep moats and earthen ramparts. Ceramic shards from China and Southeast Asia have also been found in each of these locations, which were inhabited continuously from the mid-Heian period into modern times.

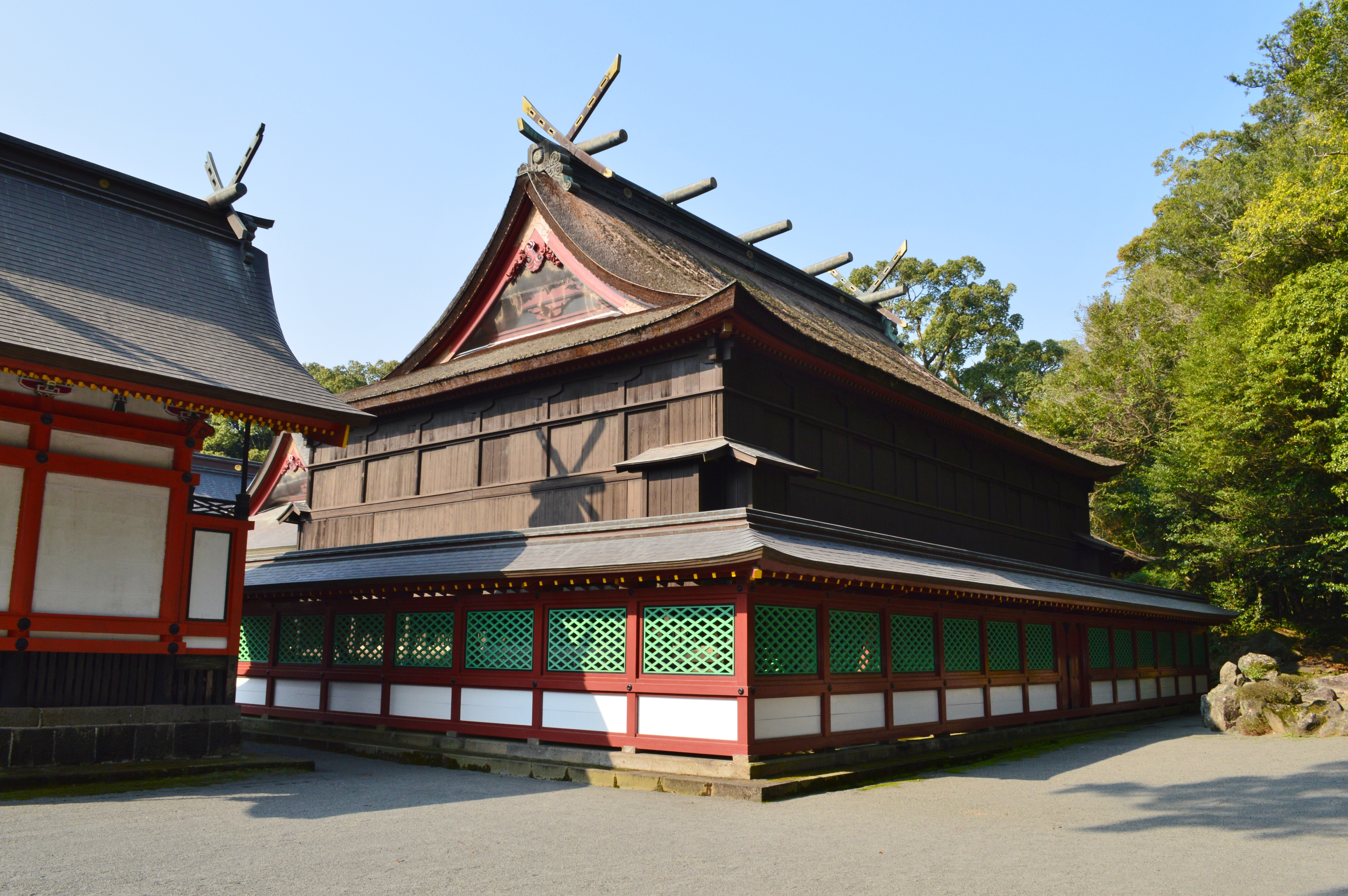
Honden (ICP)

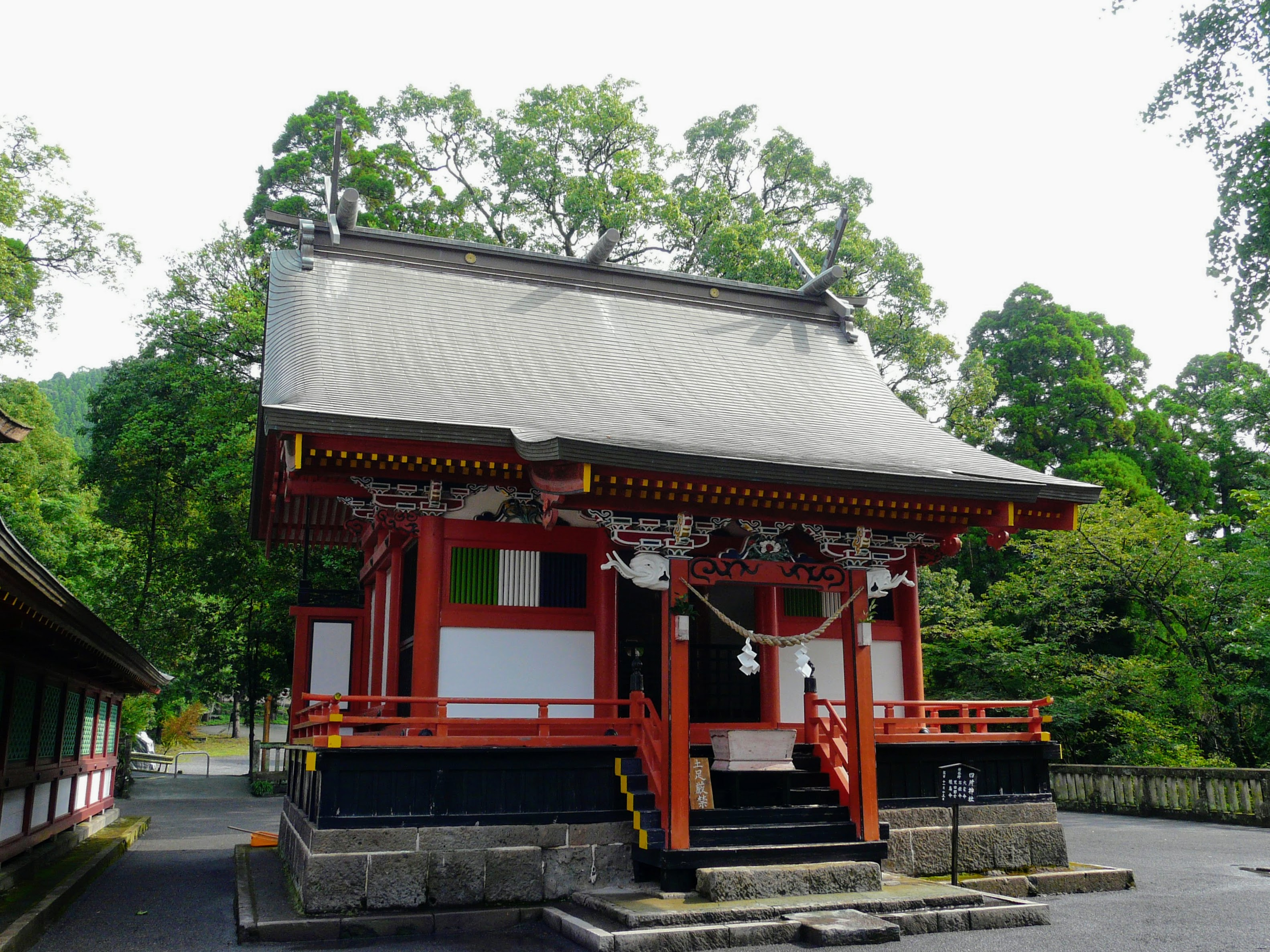
Shisho Jinja (ICP)

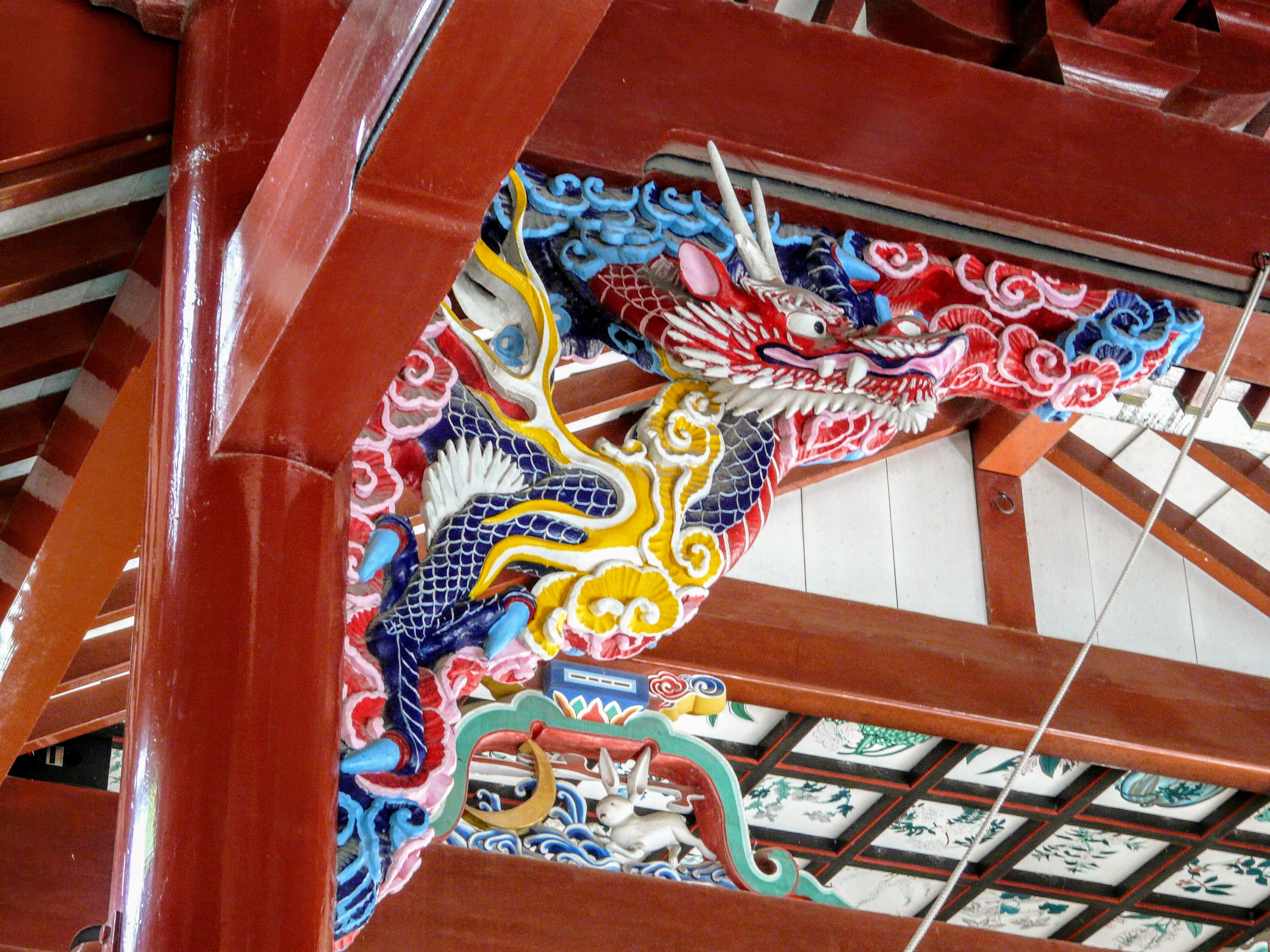
Decoration on Chokushi-den (ICP)

=== National Important Cultural Properties ===
- Honden (本殿, Main Shrine), Chokushi-den (勅使殿, Imperial Messenger Hall), and Sessha Shisho Jinja Honden (摂社四所神社本殿, Sub-shrine Shisho Jinja Main Shrine), constructed in 1755 by Shimazu Shigetoshi and completed by Shimazu Shigehide. Designated Important Cultural Properties in 2022

== See also ==
- List of Historic Sites of Japan (Kagoshima)
- Ichinomiya
