= Daiichi Institute of Technology =

Coordinates: 31°44′49″N 130°46′08″E

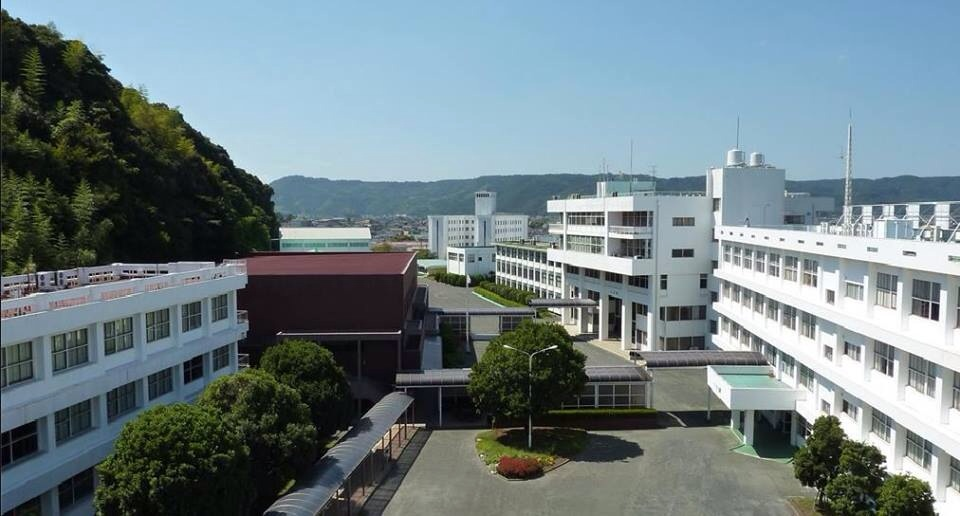
Daiichi Institute of Technology

Daiichi Institute of Technology (第一工業大学, Daiichi kōgyō daigaku) is a private university in Kirishima, Kagoshima, Japan. The predecessor of the school was founded in 1955, and eventually it adopted the present name in 1985.
