= Hayato, Kagoshima =

Town in Aira District, Kagoshima Prefecture, Japan

Hayato (隼人町, Hayato-chō) is a town located in Aira District, Kagoshima Prefecture, Japan.

As of 2008, the town had an estimated population of 43,844 and the density of 555.30 persons per km^{2}. The total area was 66.49 km^{2}.

On November 7, 2005, Hayato, along with the city of Kokubu, the towns of Kirishima (former), Fukuyama, Makizono, Mizobe and Yokogawa (all from Aira District), was merged to create the city of Kirishima and no longer exists as an independent municipality.

Extract from the Hayato website:

Hayato is located in the center of Kagoshima Prefecture in southern Japan and has a population of 37,000. Covering an area of 66.49 square kilometers, Hayato is a land rich in nature with Kinko Bay to the south and Kirishima mountains to the north. In the nearby waters one can see the small islands of Kamitsukuri floating in the distance, famous for Takachiho Shrine, where the shinto god Hikohohodemi no Mikoto rested in ancient times. Ruins surrounding this as well historical sites of the Kumaso Aborigines, who wielded power anciently in southern Kyushu, offer us many diverse legends and romanticism.

Along the Amori River, which flows through the town, are the Hayato Hot Spring villages (Hinatayama and Myoken Hot Springs), which are well known from days of old and boast abundant hot water of superior quality. In 1984, the Kokubu-Hayato area was designated as a Technopolis and many modern industries have moved into the area. In 1986, Hayato received the designation of Teletopia (meaning telecommunications utopia). Hayato offers an attractive living environment where abundant nature, history and high technology exist side by side.
