= Fukuyama, Kagoshima =

Dissolved municipality in Kagoshima prefecture, Japan

Fukuyama (福山町, Fukuyama-chō) was a town located in Aira District, Kagoshima Prefecture, Japan.

As of 2003, the town had an estimated population of 7,209 and the density of 105.21 persons per km^{2}. The total area was 68.52 km^{2}.

On November 7, 2005, Fukuyama, along with the city of Kokubu, the towns of Kirishima (former), Hayato, Makizono, Mizobe and Yokogawa (all from Aira District), was merged to create the city of Kirishima and no longer exists as an independent municipality.
