= Matsushita Museum of Art =

Museum in Kirishima, Kagoshima Prefecture, Japan

- 松下美術館
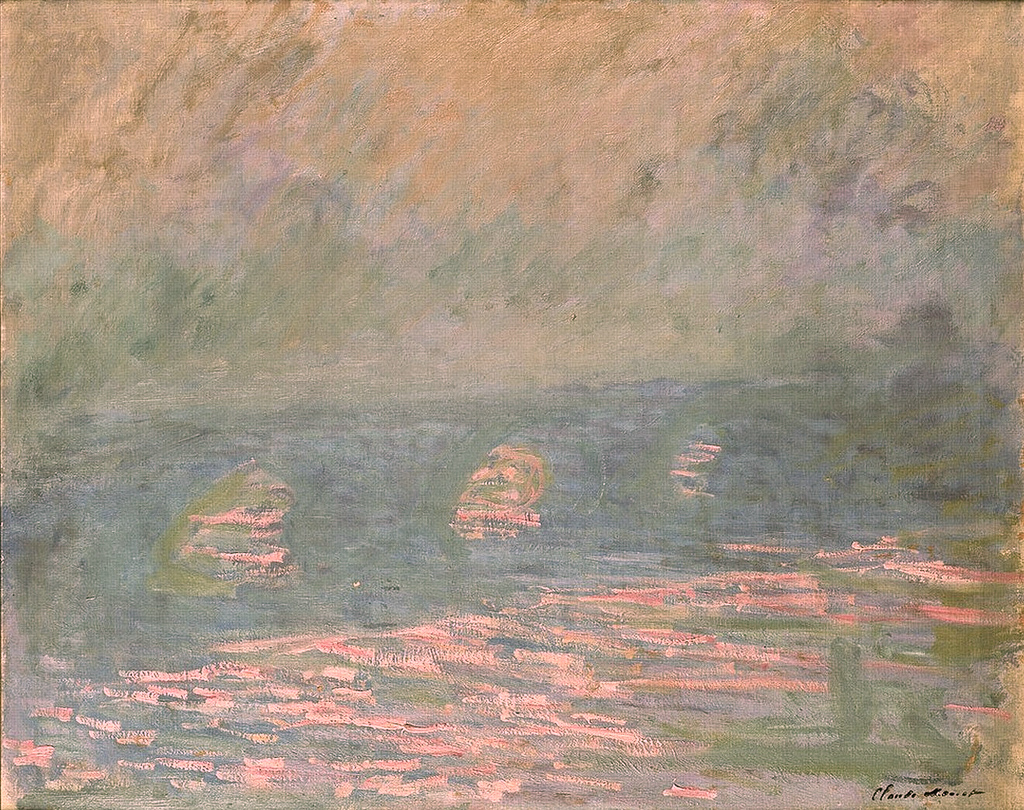
- Waterloo Bridge by Claude Monet
- Interactive map of the Matsushita Museum of Art area

General information
- Location: 771 Fukuyama, Fukuyama-chō, Kirishima, Kagoshima Prefecture, Japan
- Coordinates: 31°39′16″N 130°49′32″E
- Opened: 1983

Website
- Official website

Matsushita Museum of Art (松下美術館, Matsushita bijutsukan) opened in Kirishima, Kagoshima Prefecture, Japan, in 1983. The collection of some three thousand works is exhibited in six buildings: the first, with works by Japanese artists associated with Kagoshima Prefecture, in particular Kuroda Seiki, Fujishima Takeji, and Wada Eisaku, as well as western artists including Monet, Renoir, Degas, and Picasso; the second for installation art; the third, antiquities; the fourth, kakejiku; the fifth, masks, including those used in kagura; and the sixth, Satsuma ware, works by the museum's first director Matsushita Kanetomo (松下兼知), and a gallery space for contemporary artists.

== See also ==
- Kagoshima City Museum of Art
- List of Cultural Properties of Japan - paintings (Kagoshima)
