= Kirishima, Kagoshima (town) =

Japanese town

The article is about a former town. For a current city, see Kirishima, Kagoshima.

Kirishima (霧島町, Kirishima-chō) was a town located in Aira District, Kagoshima Prefecture, Japan.

As of July 1, 2005 (prior to the merger), the town had a population of 5,795 and the density of 70.21 people/km^{2}. The total area was 82.54 km^{2}.

On November 7, 2005, Kirishima absorbed with the old city of Kokubu, and the towns of Fukuyama, Hayato, Makizono, Mizobe and Yokogawa (all from Aira District), to create the city of Kirishima.

The Kirishima region is famous for the Kirishima Shrine (霧島神宮) and the chain of volcanic mountains above it, especially Mt. Takachiho (高千穂). According to traditional Shinto legends, Ninigi-no-Mikoto, descendant of the Japanese sun-goddess Amaterasu, descended from heaven to Mt. Takachiho, bringing the three celestial gifts that signified the divinity of the emperor. The story is detailed in the Nihon Shoki ('Chronicles of Japan').
