= Uenohara site =

Jomon archaeological site in southern Japan

Uenohara Site
- 上野原遺跡 (Japanese)
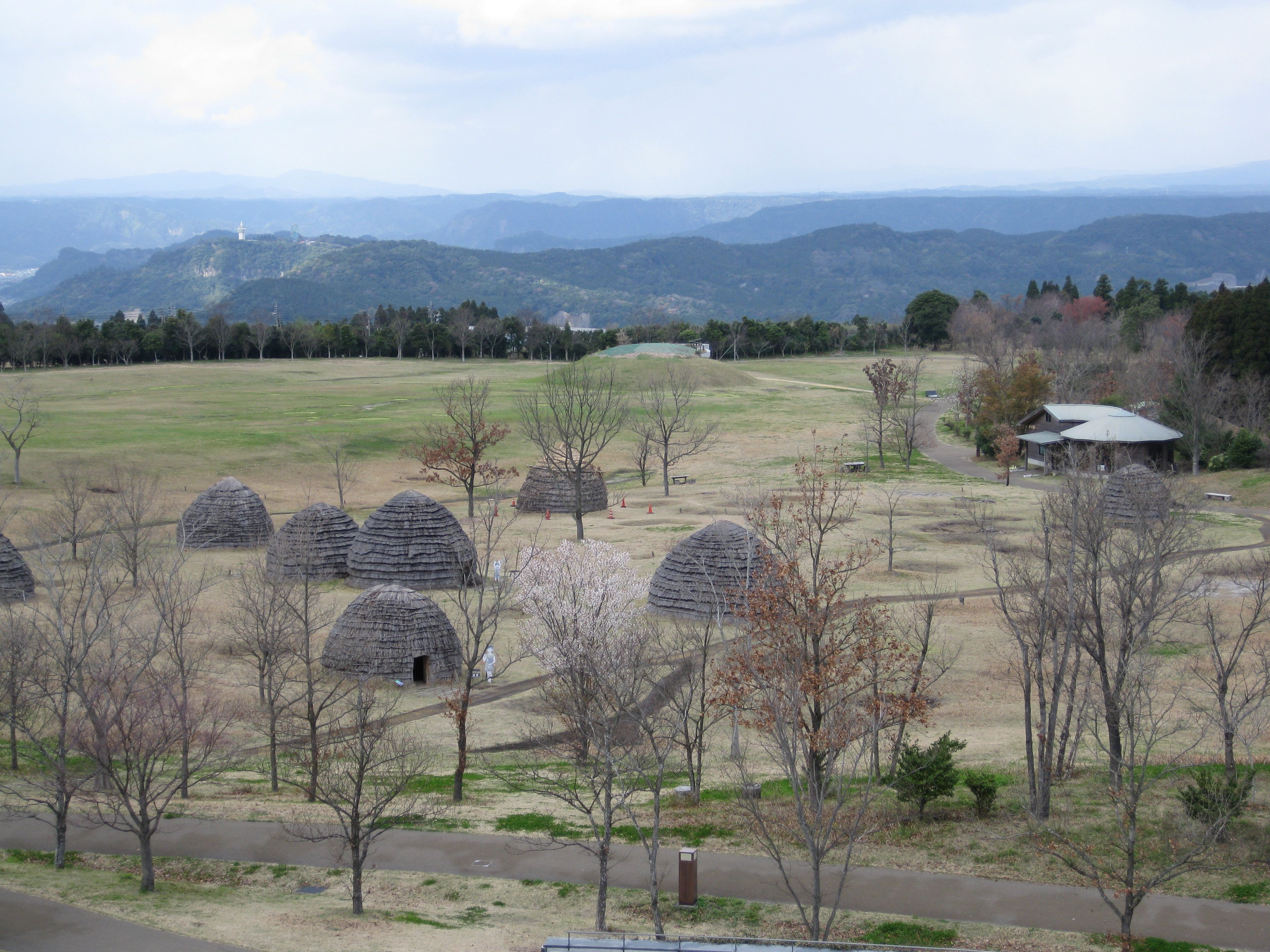
- Uenohara Site with reconstructed pit dwellings

- Uenohara Site Uenohara site (Japan)
- Interactive map of Uenohara Site
- 31°42′44.9″N 130°48′04.1″E
- Type: settlement trace
- Periods: Jōmon period
- Location: Kirishima, Kagoshima, Japan
- Region: Kyushu

Site notes
- Area: 36 ha (89 acres)
- Excavation dates: 1986-
- Condition: Archaeological park
- Public access: Yes (park, museum)

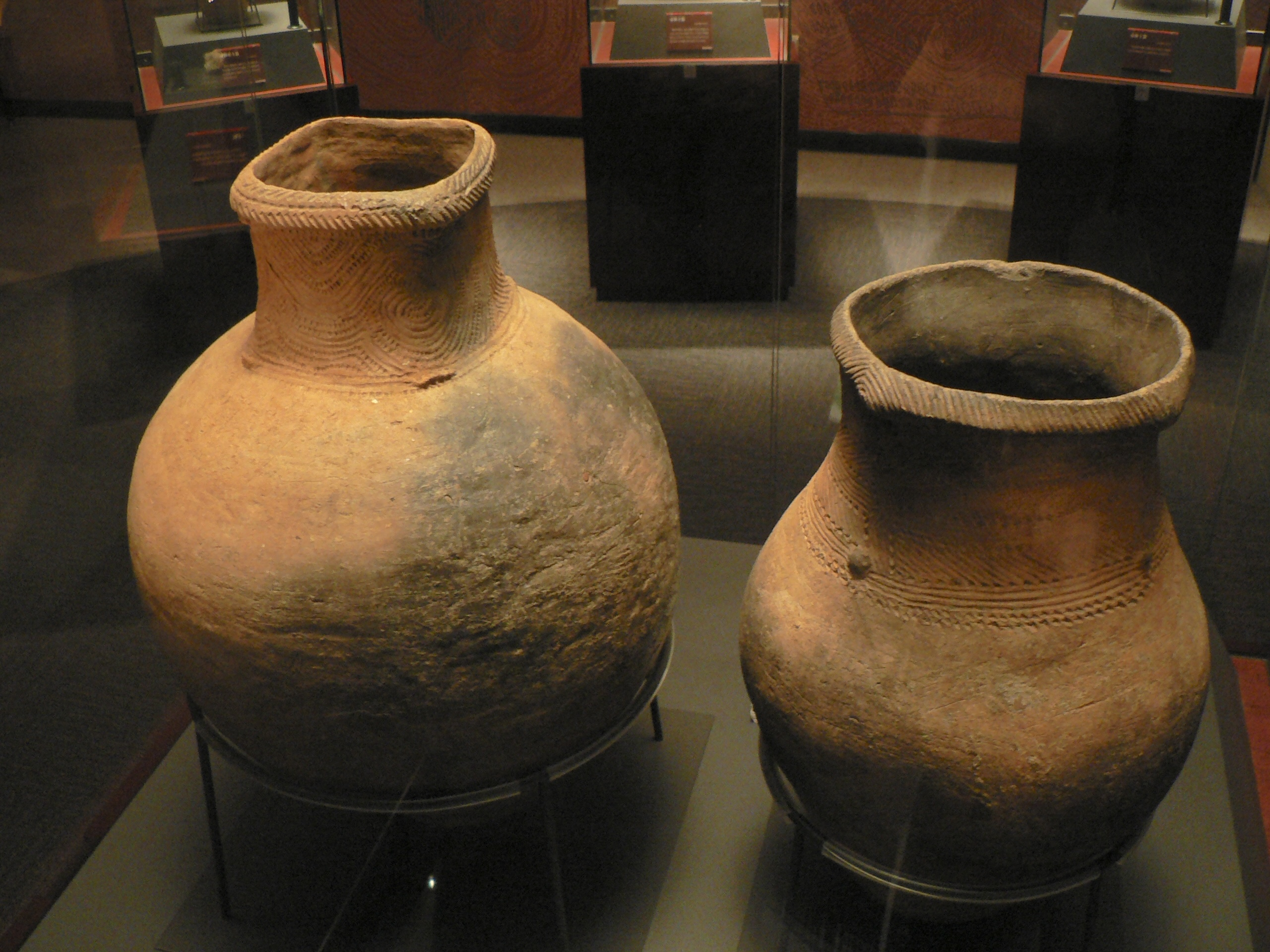
Jōmon pottery from the Uenohara Site

Uenohara Site (上野原遺跡, Uenohara iseki) is an archeological site with the ruins of a Jōmon period settlement located in the Kokubu neighborhood of the city of Kirishima, Kagoshima, Japan. It was designated as a National Historic Site in 1999.

== Overview ==
The Uenohara Site is located on the Uenohara Plateau at an elevation of approximately 260 meters, bordering Kinko Bay (Kagoshima Bay). The plateau is composed of thick layers of pumice and volcanic ash that originate from Mount Sakurajima. The site contains a complex of ruins dating from the early Jōmon period with the ruins discovered on the north side of the plateau directly beneath the pumice layer (P-13), which fell about 9,500 years ago. This date has also been verified by mass spectrometer analysis. The settlement utilized a shallow natural valley extending from the center to the northern edge of the plateau, spreading out along two roads. It was found to contain 52 pit dwellings, 65 stone collection remains, 16 storage pits arranged in an orderly manner, making it some of the oldest permanent settlements in Japan. The remains of pit dwellings are square or rectangular with rounded corners, two to five meters on each side, and have a floor area of three to ten square meters.The known dates of eruptions from nearby Mount Sakurajima has assisted with dating, with some 17 layers of stratification identified. The remains were found in the upper nine layers.

On the south side of the plateau are remains of stone collections from around 7,500 years ago from the late early Jōmon period, believed to be cooking and food preservation sites, ritual remains containing large pot-shaped Jōmon earthenware, and polished stone axes, etc., and more than 150,000 pieces of earthenware, stone tools, and accessories. The pottery excavated from this village site was designated as a National Important Cultural Property in 1998. From the remains and artifacts discovered, it is believed that food preparation methods were established early on, and that a stable society existed from the early Jōmon period onwards, ahead of other regions.

Currently, the ruins have been backfilled for protection, and the 36 hectare area around the ruins is maintained as a park called Uenohara Jōmon-no-Mori (上野原縄文の森) with restorations of pit buildings. In addition, exhibition facilities and the Kagoshima Prefectural Buried Cultural Properties Center (鹿児島県立埋蔵文化財センタ-) are located on the premises, making it a base for archaeological research within Kagoshima Prefecture. The site is approximately 20 minutes by car from Kokubu Station on the JR Kyushu Nippō Main Line.

== See also ==
- List of Historic Sites of Japan (Kagoshima)
