= Yokogawa, Kagoshima =

Dissolved municipality in Kagoshima prefecture, Japan

Yokogawa (横川町, Yokogawa-chō) was a town located in Aira District, Kagoshima Prefecture, Japan.

As of 2003, the town had an estimated population of 5,397 and the density of 76.61 persons per km^{2}. The total area was 70.45 km^{2}.

On November 7, 2005, Yokogawa, along with the city of Kokubu, the towns of Kirishima (former), Fukuyama, Hayato, Makizono and Mizobe (all from Aira District), was merged to create the city of Kirishima and no longer exists as an independent municipality.

== Geography ==
Yokogawa is located in the center of Kagoshima Prefecture (excluding remote islands). The town was part of the Kirishima mountain range and has a relatively high altitude, little flat land, and mostly forested.

The Amori river [ja:天降川] passed through it.

== History ==
April 1, 1889: Kaminomura, Nakanomura, and Shimonomura in Kuwabara County merged to form Yokokawa Village.

April 1, 1940: Yokokawa Village was incorporated as Yokokawa Town.

November 7, 2005: Fukushima Hideyuki appointed as mayor.
