= Kirishima, Kagoshima =

Kirishima 霧島市
- City
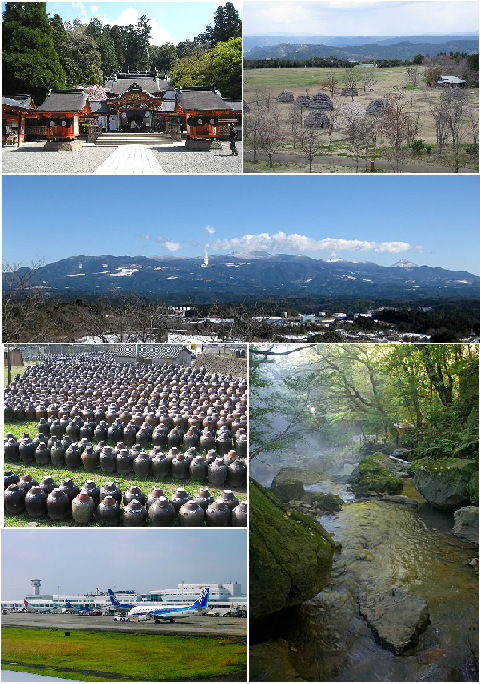
- From top left: Kirishima shrine, Uenohara site, Mount Kirishima from Maruoka, Producing black vinegar at Fukuyama, Ryokukeitouen of Eino-o Onsen, Kagoshima Airport

- Flag Seal
- Interactive map of Kirishima
- Location in Japan Location of Kirishima in Kagoshima Prefecture
- Coordinates: 31°44′28″N 130°45′48″E
- Country: Japan
- Region: Kyūshū
- Prefecture: Kagoshima

Government
  - Mayor: Shin'ichi Nakashige

Area
  - Total: 603.71 km^{2} (233.09 sq mi)

Population (May 1, 2024)
  - Total: 123,640
  - Density: 204.80/km^{2} (530.43/sq mi)
- Time zone: UTC+09:00 (JST)
- Postal code: 899-4394
- Phone number: 0995-45-5111
- Address: 3-45-1 Kokubuchūō, Kirishima-shi, Kagoshima-ken
- Climate: Cfa
- Website: Official website
- Symbols
- Flower: Rhododendron kiusianum Nicotiana × sanderae
- Tree: Ilex rotunda Acer

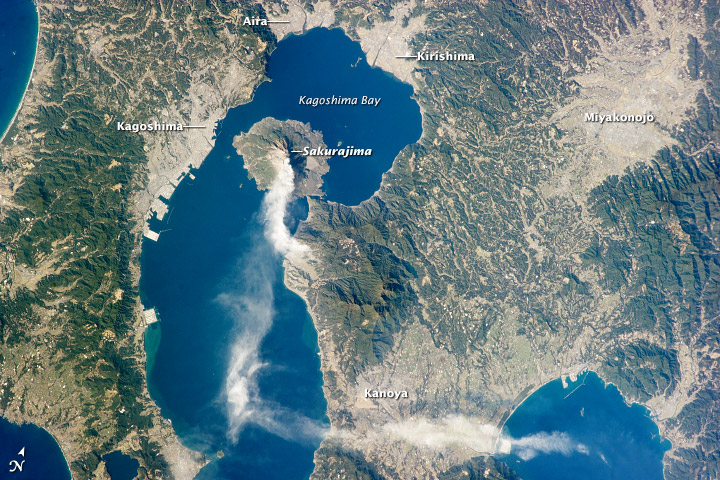
An image taken from the International Space Station showing Kirishima and its surroundings on January 10, 2013

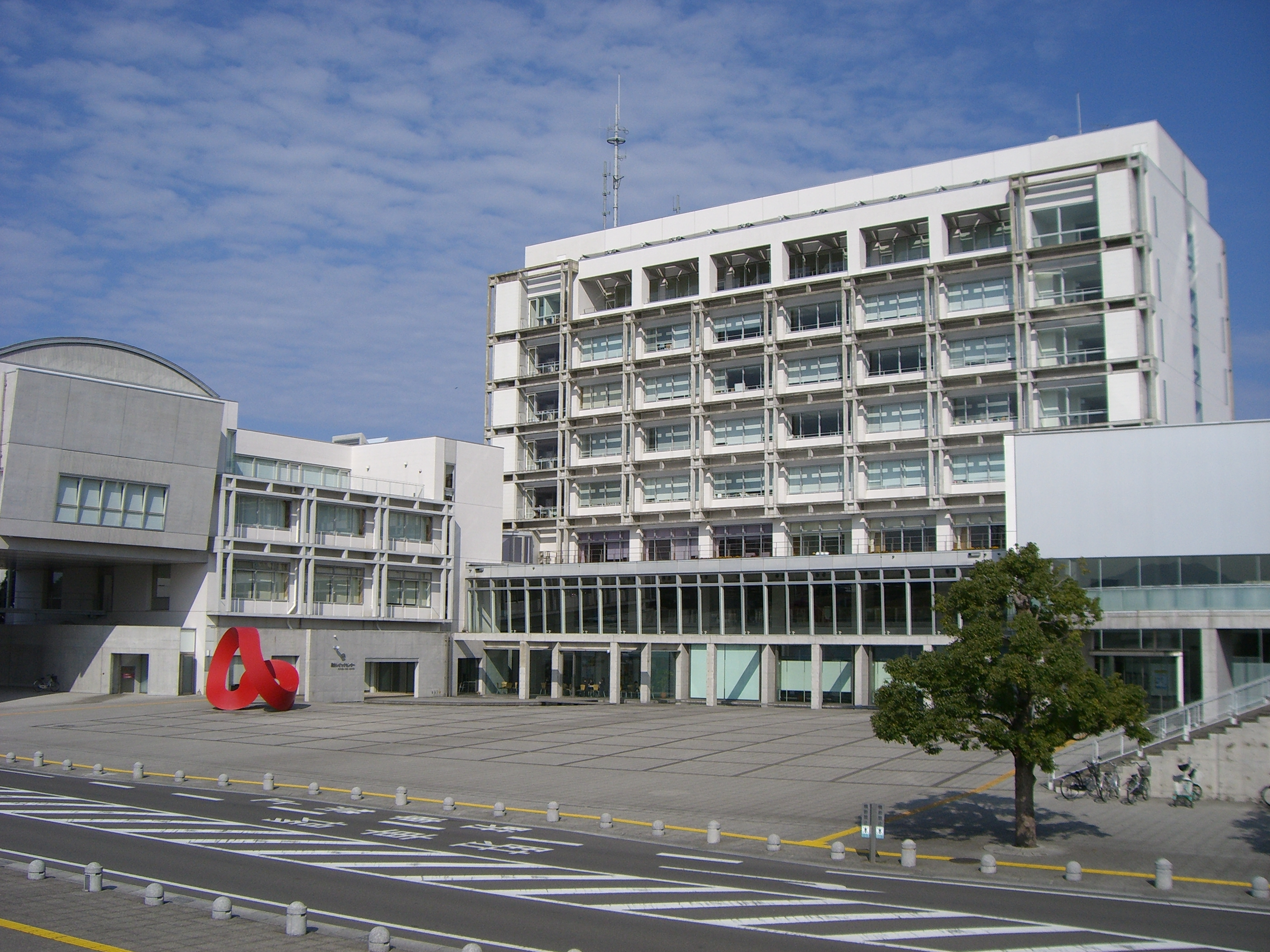
Kirishima City Hall

Kirishima (霧島市, Kirishima-shi) is a city located in Kagoshima Prefecture, Japan. As of 1 May 2024, the city had an estimated population of 123,640 in 63202 households, and a population density of 200 persons per km^{2}. The total area of the city is 603.17 km^{2} (232.89 sq mi). Kirishima has the second largest population of the cities in Kagoshima Prefecture. It is a crossroads for commerce between Kagoshima and Miyazaki Prefectures. It is also the home of the Kagoshima Airport, the terminus for the JR Hisatsu line, and is served by two major expressways. The former Kokubu-Hayato area was designated as a "Technopolis" as high tech industries such as Sony and Kyocera opened facilities in the city.

== Geography ==
Kirishima is located in central Kagoshima Prefecture, facing Kagoshima Bay to the south and bordered by the volcanic Kirishima Mountains to the east. Parts of the city are within the borders of the Kirishima-Yaku National Park.

- Mountains
  - Eboshi dake
  - Karakuni dake
  - Mount Kirishima (see List of volcanoes in Japan)
  - Shinmoedake
  - Takachiho no-mine

=== Surrounding municipalities ===
- Aira
- Kanoya
- Satsuma
- Satsumasendai
- Soo
- Tarumizu
- Yūsui

Miyazaki Prefecture

- Ebino
- Kobayashi
- Miyakonojo
- Takaharu

=== Climate ===
Kirishima has a humid subtropical climate (Köppen climate classification Cfa) with hot summers and mild winters. Precipitation is significant throughout the year, and is heavier in summer, especially the months of June and July. The average annual temperature in Kirishima is 15.4 °C (59.7 °F). The average annual rainfall is 2,830.7 mm (111.44 in) with June as the wettest month. The temperatures are highest on average in August, at around 25.2 °C (77.4 °F), and lowest in January, at around 5.3 °C (41.5 °F). Its record high is 35.1 °C (95.2 °F), reached on 17 August 2020, and its record low is −8.6 °C (16.5 °F), reached on 25 January 2016.

Climate data for Kirishima (1991−2020 normals, extremes 1977−present)
Month	Jan	Feb	Mar	Apr	May	Jun	Jul	Aug	Sep	Oct	Nov	Dec	Year
Record high °C (°F)	19.4 (66.9)	21.1 (70.0)	23.8 (74.8)	26.9 (80.4)	31.1 (88.0)	32.0 (89.6)	34.7 (94.5)	35.1 (95.2)	33.3 (91.9)	30.3 (86.5)	26.4 (79.5)	21.5 (70.7)	35.1 (95.2)
Mean daily maximum °C (°F)	9.5 (49.1)	11.1 (52.0)	14.3 (57.7)	18.8 (65.8)	22.8 (73.0)	24.7 (76.5)	28.8 (83.8)	29.7 (85.5)	27.2 (81.0)	22.6 (72.7)	17.2 (63.0)	11.8 (53.2)	19.9 (67.8)
Daily mean °C (°F)	5.3 (41.5)	6.5 (43.7)	9.5 (49.1)	13.9 (57.0)	17.9 (64.2)	20.9 (69.6)	24.7 (76.5)	25.2 (77.4)	22.7 (72.9)	18.0 (64.4)	12.7 (54.9)	7.5 (45.5)	15.4 (59.7)
Mean daily minimum °C (°F)	1.5 (34.7)	2.3 (36.1)	5.2 (41.4)	9.5 (49.1)	14.0 (57.2)	18.1 (64.6)	22.0 (71.6)	22.4 (72.3)	19.5 (67.1)	14.3 (57.7)	8.7 (47.7)	3.5 (38.3)	11.8 (53.2)
Record low °C (°F)	−8.6 (16.5)	−7.8 (18.0)	−5.6 (21.9)	0.2 (32.4)	2.4 (36.3)	11.7 (53.1)	15.3 (59.5)	17.1 (62.8)	10.3 (50.5)	3.4 (38.1)	−2.8 (27.0)	−5.5 (22.1)	−8.6 (16.5)
Average precipitation mm (inches)	73.4 (2.89)	119.8 (4.72)	174.3 (6.86)	204.3 (8.04)	238.2 (9.38)	644.6 (25.38)	459.7 (18.10)	307.7 (12.11)	304.4 (11.98)	121.7 (4.79)	104.6 (4.12)	78.1 (3.07)	2,830.7 (111.44)
Average precipitation days (≥ 1.0 mm)	8.3	9.0	12.7	11.5	11.1	17.4	13.8	13.4	11.7	7.8	8.3	7.1	132.1
Mean monthly sunshine hours	145.2	144.0	166.2	174.3	174.9	101.7	162.7	180.3	151.6	178.4	153.5	150.3	1,883.3
Source: Japan Meteorological Agency

Climate data for Mizobe, Kirishima (1995−2020 normals, extremes 1995−present)
Month	Jan	Feb	Mar	Apr	May	Jun	Jul	Aug	Sep	Oct	Nov	Dec	Year
Record high °C (°F)	20.8 (69.4)	22.4 (72.3)	26.1 (79.0)	27.9 (82.2)	31.8 (89.2)	32.7 (90.9)	35.5 (95.9)	36.7 (98.1)	33.8 (92.8)	32.4 (90.3)	26.7 (80.1)	21.7 (71.1)	36.7 (98.1)
Mean daily maximum °C (°F)	10.5 (50.9)	12.4 (54.3)	15.7 (60.3)	20.3 (68.5)	24.3 (75.7)	26.0 (78.8)	30.0 (86.0)	30.9 (87.6)	28.3 (82.9)	23.8 (74.8)	18.2 (64.8)	12.7 (54.9)	21.1 (70.0)
Daily mean °C (°F)	5.4 (41.7)	6.9 (44.4)	10.0 (50.0)	14.5 (58.1)	18.7 (65.7)	21.8 (71.2)	25.5 (77.9)	26.0 (78.8)	23.3 (73.9)	18.3 (64.9)	12.7 (54.9)	7.3 (45.1)	15.9 (60.6)
Mean daily minimum °C (°F)	0.5 (32.9)	1.6 (34.9)	4.5 (40.1)	8.9 (48.0)	13.5 (56.3)	18.2 (64.8)	22.0 (71.6)	22.3 (72.1)	19.3 (66.7)	13.6 (56.5)	7.7 (45.9)	2.4 (36.3)	11.2 (52.2)
Record low °C (°F)	−10.7 (12.7)	−7.7 (18.1)	−4.3 (24.3)	−0.7 (30.7)	4.3 (39.7)	9.0 (48.2)	15.4 (59.7)	15.2 (59.4)	9.8 (49.6)	2.4 (36.3)	−2.4 (27.7)	−6.4 (20.5)	−10.7 (12.7)
Average precipitation mm (inches)	70.2 (2.76)	119.2 (4.69)	177.3 (6.98)	207.0 (8.15)	227.3 (8.95)	625.9 (24.64)	451.2 (17.76)	264.1 (10.40)	251.7 (9.91)	110.5 (4.35)	105.5 (4.15)	82.9 (3.26)	2,692.8 (106.02)
Average precipitation days (≥ 1.0 mm)	7.9	8.8	12.1	11.1	10.4	16.5	14.2	12.3	10.4	7.4	8.3	7.5	126.9
Source: Japan Meteorological Agency

=== Demographics ===
Per Japanese census data, the population of Kirishima is as shown below:

Historical population
Year	Pop.	±%
1920	86,198	—
1930	90,540	+5.0%
1940	90,973	+0.5%
1950	122,982	+35.2%
1960	113,032	−8.1%
1970	95,326	−15.7%
1980	102,157	+7.2%
1990	116,247	+13.8%
2000	127,912	+10.0%
2010	127,487	−0.3%
2020	123,135	−3.4%

== History ==
The area of Kirishima has been inhabited since prehistoric times. The Uenohara site dates from the Jōmon period, and in the Kofun period the area was a stronghold of the Hayato people. In the Nara period, it became the center of ancient Ōsumi Province, and the location of the provincial capital and Provincial temple. The area largely became part of Shimazu shōen from the late Heian period, and continued to be ruled by the Shimazu clan throughout the Edo Period.

Kagoshima Airport, operating since 1972, is the main airport for Kagoshima Prefecture and can be found in Kirishima. It's located in the Mizobe area, which used to be its own town separate from Kirishima. The modern city of Kirishima was established on November 7, 2005, from the merger of the city of Kokubu, and the towns of Fukuyama, Hayato, Kirishima (former), Makizono, Mizobe and Yokogawa (all from Aira District). In the evening of August 7, 2025 Kirishima was inundated by the torrential rain that hit many parts of Kagoshima Prefecture on that date. The following day the Japan Meteorological Agency issued a heavy rain emergency for the city. Although there was widespread damage including knee-deep water in a shopping mall there were no fatalities reported.<https://www.youtube.com/watch?v=ELlBqyLKwuw><https://www.nbcnews.com/world/japan/japan-heavy-rain-floods-mudslides-rcna223810>

== Government ==
Kirishima has a mayor-council form of government with a directly elected mayor and a unicameral city council of 25 members. Kirishima, collectively with the town of Yūsui, contributes four members to the Kagoshima Prefectural Assembly. In terms of national politics, the city is part of the Kagoshima 4th district of the lower house of the Diet of Japan.

== Economy ==
Kirishima has a mixed economy. Agriculture still plays a major role, with main specialty products: strawberries, tomatoes, burdock, green onions, buckwheat, leaf tobacco, mandarin oranges, tea, chestnuts, shiitake mushrooms, beef cattle, eel, etc. Local leaf tobacco production is said to have begun in 1606, shortly after tobacco was introduced to Japan. Since then, it has continued to be one of the leading production areas in Japan, but in recent years it has been steadily shrinking. Taking advantage of the geographical conditions resulting from the opening of Kagoshima Airport and the Kyushu Expressway, the city has encouraged high-tech industries such as Sony and Kyocera to build large scale production plants in the area. On the other hand, Kirishima is also a tourist destination, noted for its volcanoes, hot springs and historic sites.

Japan Air Commuter has its headquarters in Kirishima.

== Education ==
=== Colleges and universities ===
- Daiichi Institute of Technology

=== Primary and secondary education ===
Kirishima has 35 public elementary high schools, 12 public junior high school and one public high school operated by the city government, and four public high schools operated by the Kagoshima Prefectural Board of Education. There is also one private junior high and one private high school. The prefecture also operates one special education school for the handicapped.

== Transportation ==
=== Airport ===
- Kagoshima Airport

=== Bus ===
- It is operated by Nangoku Transportation, Iwasaki Transportation, and Sansyu Motor Company, as well as airport limousines

=== Railways ===
JR Kyushu - Nippō Main Line

- Kita-Naganoda - Kirishima-Jingū - Kokubu - Hayato

JR Kyushu - Hisatsu Line

- Hayato - Hinatayama - Hyōkiyama - Nakafukura - Kareigawa - Kirishima-Onsen - Uemura - Ōsumi-Yokogawa

=== Highway ===
- Kyushu Expressway: Yokogawa IC - Mizobe PA - Mizobe-Kagoshima Airport IC
- Higashikyushu Expressway: Kokubu IC - Hayato-Higashi IC - Hayato-Nishi IC
- National Route 10
- National Route 220
- National Route 223
- National Route 504

== Sister cities ==
- Sonora, California, United States

== Local attractions ==
- Hayatozuka
- Kagoshima Shrine
- Kirishima Shrine
- Kokubu Castle - A castle ruin, death place of Shimazu Yoshihisa
- Ōsumi Kokubun-ji ruins
- Takachiho-gawara
- Uenohara Site

== Notable people from Kirishima ==
- Kento Tachibanada, Professional footballer
- Hayato Tani, Actor and TV presenter

== See also ==
- Matsushita Museum of Art
