= Mizobe, Kagoshima =

Dissolved municipality in Kagoshima prefecture, Japan

Mizobe (溝辺町, Mizobe-chō) was a town located in Aira District, Kagoshima Prefecture, Japan.

As of 2003, the town had an estimated population of 8,615 and a density of 135.67 persons per km^{2}. The total area was 63.50 km^{2}. The area to the west and east are mountainous while farmlands are within the valley areas.

On November 7, 2005, Mizobe, along with the city of Kokubu, the towns of Kirishima (former), Fukuyama, Hayato, Makizono and Yokogawa (all from Aira District), was merged to create the city of Kirishima and no longer exists as an independent municipality.

Kagoshima's airport is to the south with a runway of nearly 2 km.

It is accessed with the Kyūshū Expressway in the south at the 24th interchange and is known as Mizobe-Kagoshima Airport interchange which was opened on November 29, 1976 and expanded northward on March 22, 1980.

Mizobe has a school, a middle school, a train station and a square.

It is bounded by Kajiki to the south.

== Economy ==
When Mizobe existed, Japan Air Commuter had its headquarters in the Kagoshima Airport Building Annex in Mizobe.
