= Ōsumi Kokubun-ji =

Historic religious ruin in Kirishima, Kagoshima, Japan

- 大隅国分寺 (Japanese)
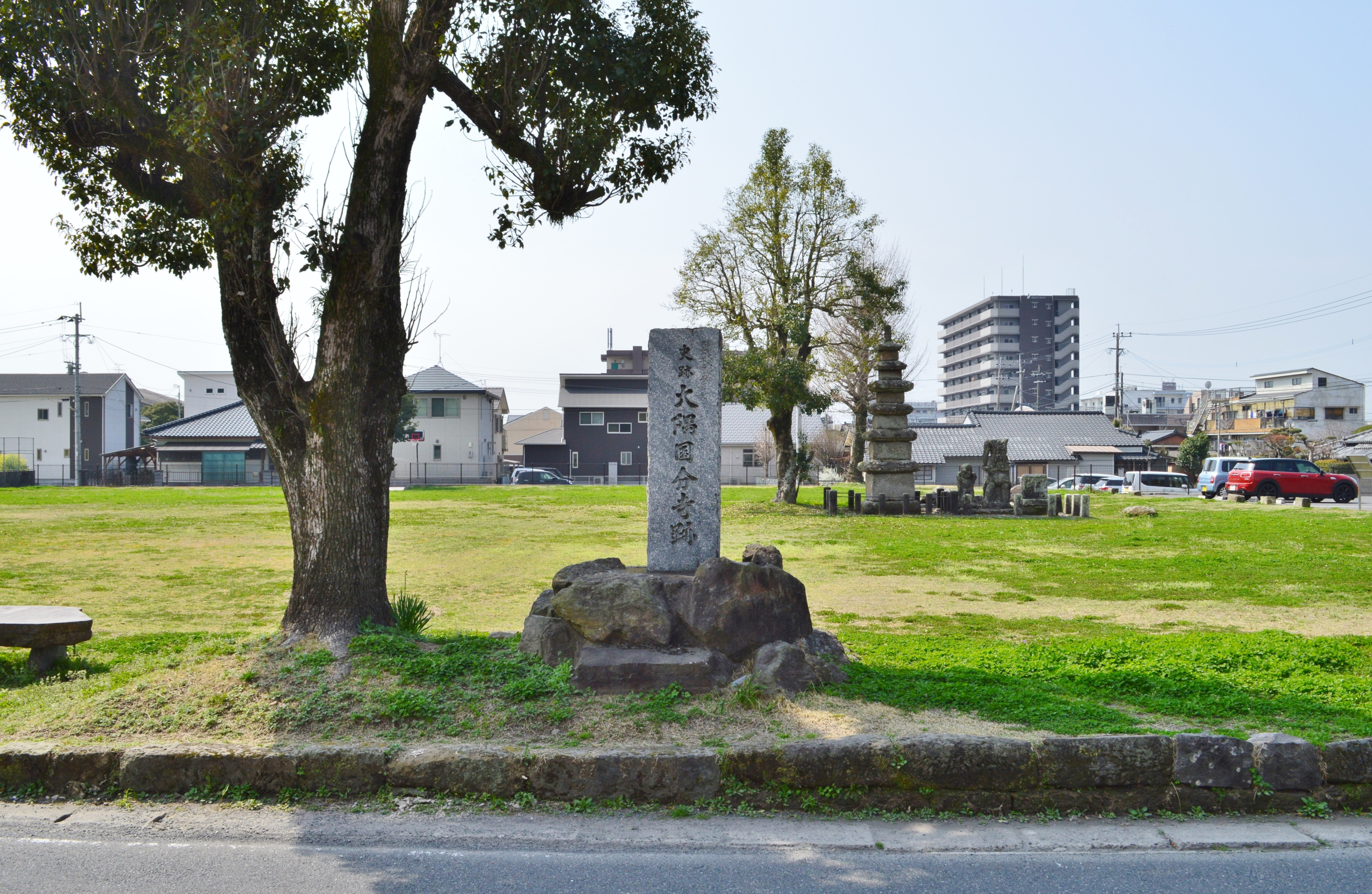
- Ōsumi Kokubun-ji Site

- Ōsumi Kokubun-ji Site Ōsumi Kokubun-ji (Japan)
- Interactive map of Ōsumi Kokubun-ji
- 31°44′28″N 130°46′17″E
- Type: kokubunji ruins
- Periods: Nara to Heian period
- Location: Kirishima, Kagoshima, Japan
- Region: Kyushu

History
- Built: between 741 and 820 AD

Site notes
- Public access: Yes (no facilities)

The Ōsumi Kokubun-ji (大隅国分寺) was a Buddhist temple located in what is now the Kokubu neighborhood of the city of Kirishima, Kagoshima, Japan. It was one of the provincial temples per the system established by Emperor Shōmu during the Nara period (710 – 794) for the purpose of promoting Buddhism as the national religion of Japan and standardising imperial rule over the provinces. The temple no longer exists, but the temple grounds were designated as a National Historic Site in 1921. In May 2004, the Miyatagaoka Tile Kiln Ruins (宮田ヶ岡瓦窯跡, Miyatagaoka karawa-gama ato) was added to the National Historic Site designation.

== Overview ==
The Shoku Nihongi records that in 741 AD, as the country recovered from a major smallpox epidemic, Emperor Shōmu ordered that a state-subsidized monastery and nunnery be established in every province for the promotion of Buddhism and to enhance political unification per the new ritsuryō system. These were the kokubunji (国分寺). The temples were constructed per a more-or-less standardized template, and were each to be staffed by twenty clerics who would pray for the state's protection. The associated provincial nunneries (kokubunniji) were on a smaller scale, each housing ten nuns to pray for the atonement of sins. This system declined when the capital was moved from Nara to Kyoto in 794 AD.

== History ==
The Ōsumi Kokubun-ji temple site is located in central Kagoshima Prefecture, on a slightly elevated area to the south of the northern part of the Kokubu urban area of Kirishima. The ruins are located at the east end of Kirishima city, west of Kokubun Elementary School. The remains of Kokubun-niji nunnery and the Ōsumi provincial capital are assumed to be nearby, but the exact locations are unknown. The exact foundation date of the temple is unknown. It first appears in historical records in a tax document for 820 AD, stating that 30,000 bundles of rice were allotted from the revenues of Hyūga Province for the upkeep of kokubunji temples, with 10,000 going to the Hyūga Kokubun-ji and 20,000 to Ōsumi. In the 927 Engishiki records, 20,000 bundles of rice are allotted to Ōsumi, with a comment made that it was now independent of Hyūga. Based on these documents, the Ōsumi Kokubun-ji was founded between 741 and 820, and it is assumed that it was towards the end of this range as this was still very much a frontier area at the time.

All that remains of the temple today is a five-meter high six-storied stone pagoda that was built in 1142, and a stele with an inscription to Kannon Bosatsu and stone statues of the Niō, which are assumed to have been erected as a prayer for revival of the temple, indicating that the Ōsumi Kokubun-ji had disappeared before the end of the Heian period. The layout of the temple is also uncertain. It is assumed that the temple compound was aligned in the compass directions, as were all other kokubunji, and that the pagoda stands as the center of the temple area; however, no foundation stones have been found, and the stone pagoda may not be in its the original location. The surrounding area was significantly altered due to the construction of the castle town of Kokubu Castle (Maizuru Castle) by Shimazu Yoshihisa in 1604, and urban encroachment in the modern era. However, due to the large numbers of Nara period roof tiles found at the site, it is certain that the temple was once at this location.

During the Tenbun era (1532–1555), the Sōtō Zen Kokubun-ji, which inherited the Nara period temple foundations, was established in nearby Kami-Ogawa Village, and reconstructed during the Genroku era (1688–1704). However, the original temple grounds were used as a cemetery from the Edo period onward, and the Sōtō temple itself was abolished in 1868 due to the early Meiji government's anti-Buddhist Haibutsu kishaku policy. After World War II, the cemetery was relocated and the Kokubu Town Community Center was established on the site. Archaeological excavations were conducted in 1981, 1987-1988 and 1997–2003. The community center was removed in 2006 and the pagoda was restored in 2020.

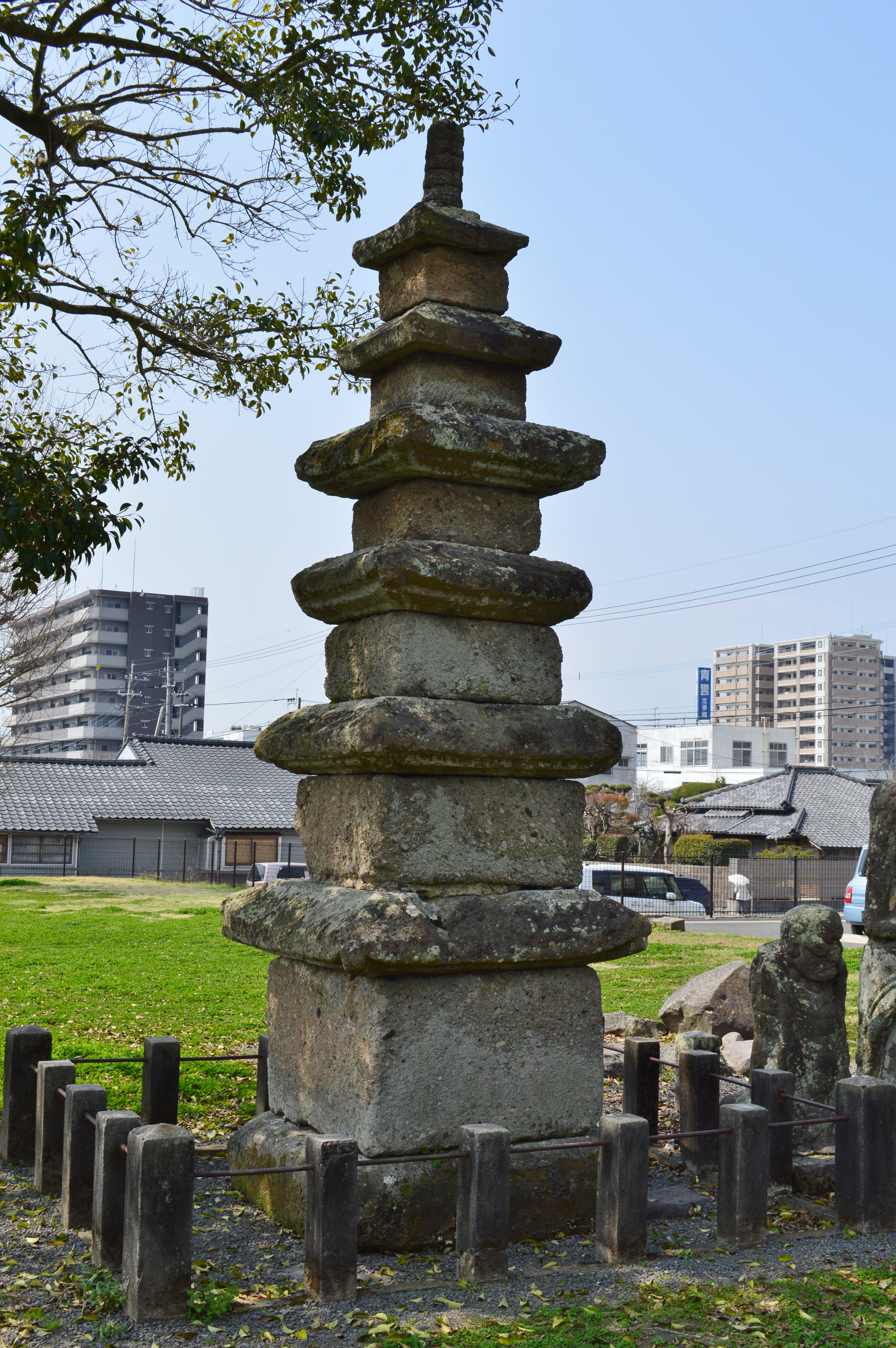
Stone Pagoda

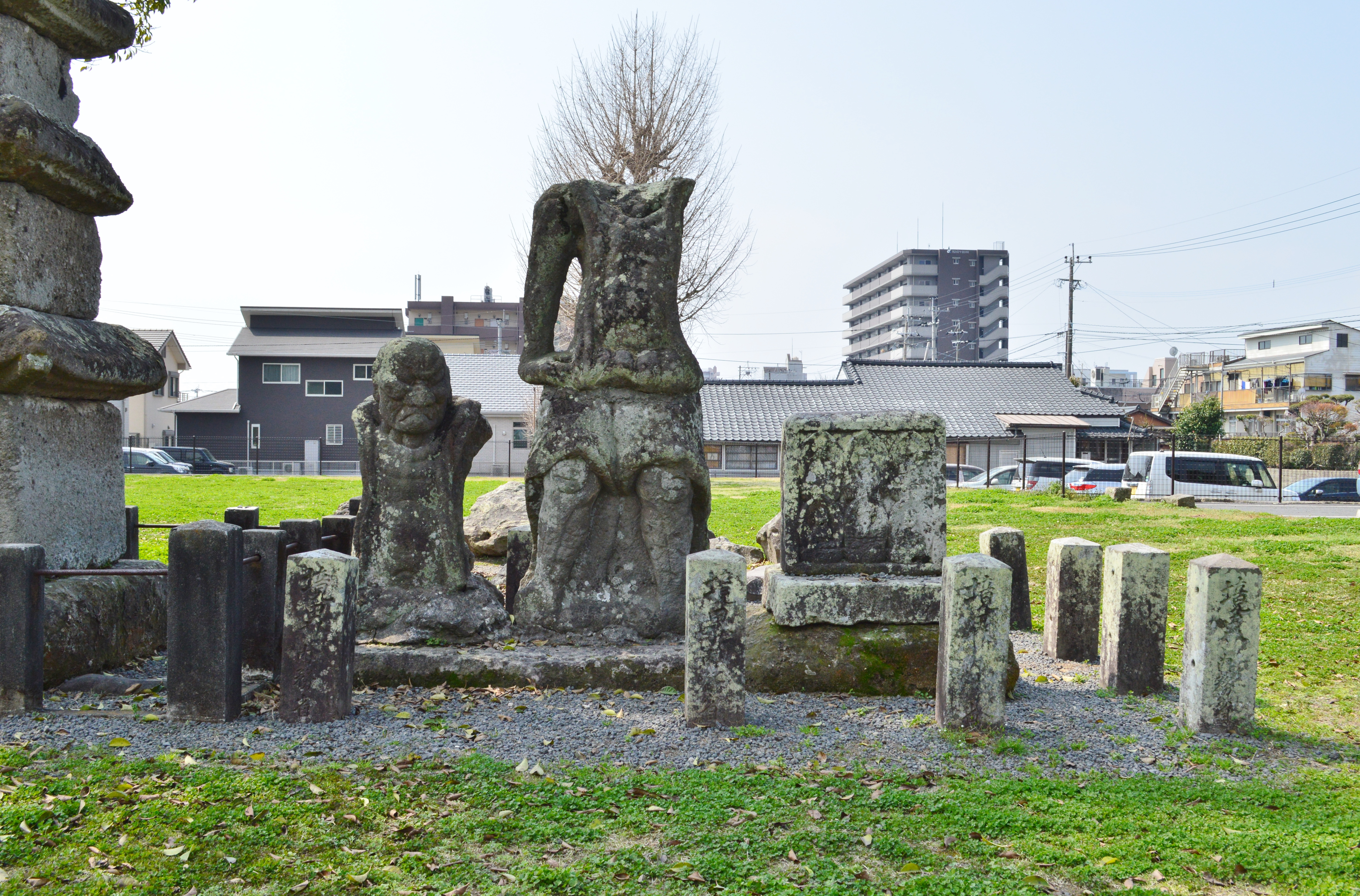
Niō statues

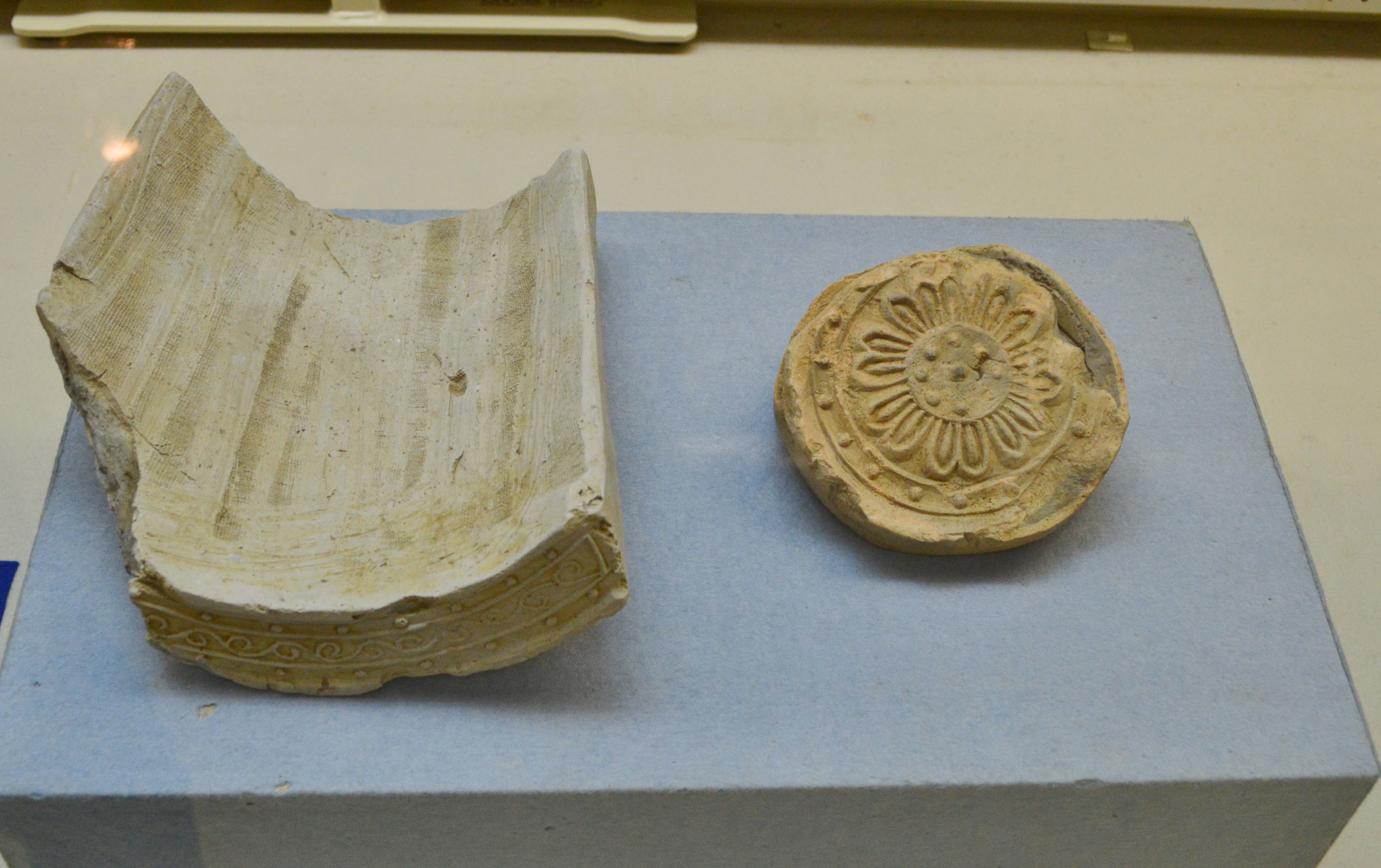
Roof tiles from Ōsumi Kokubun-ji site

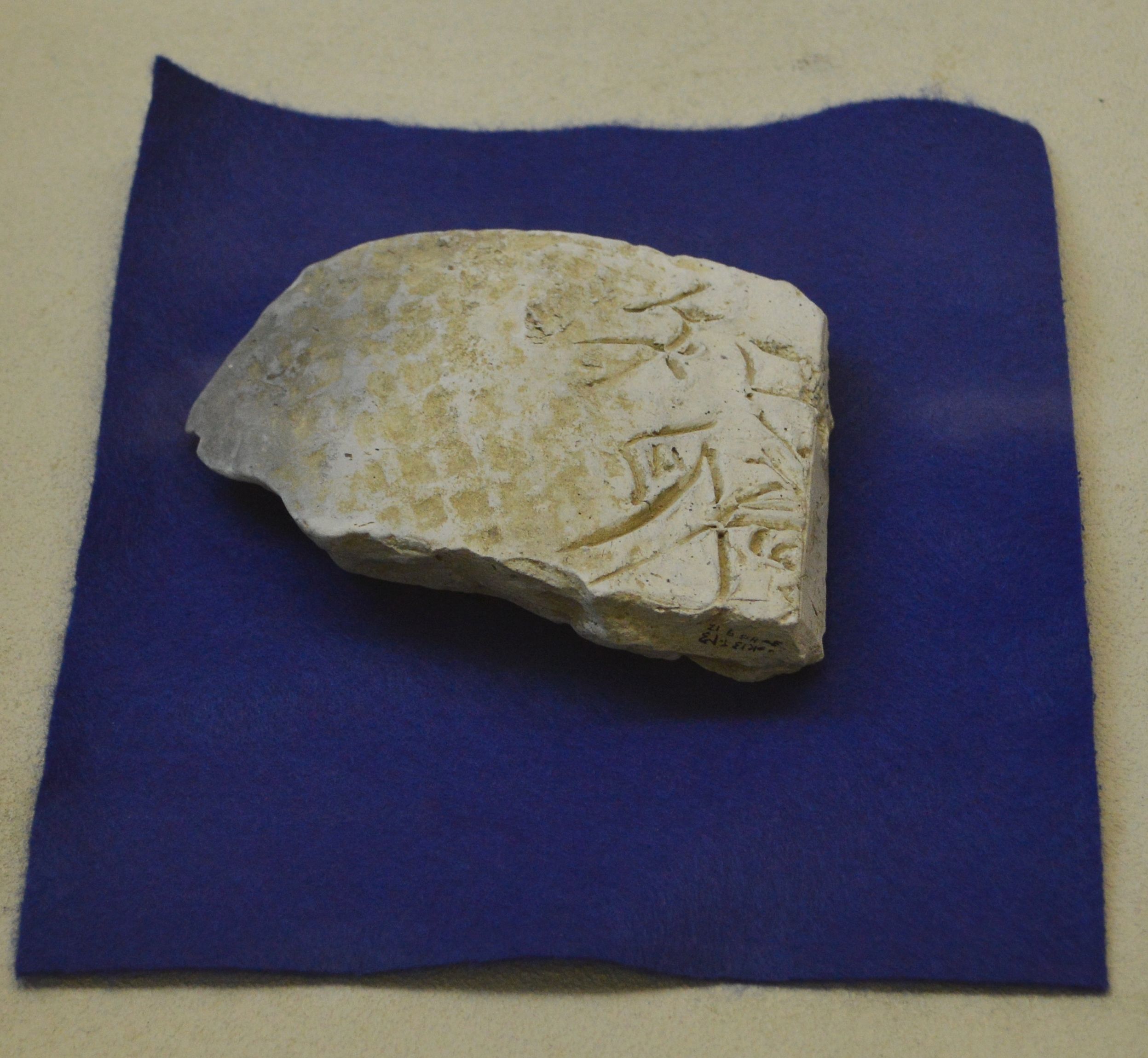
Roof tiles from Ōsumi Kokubun-ji site

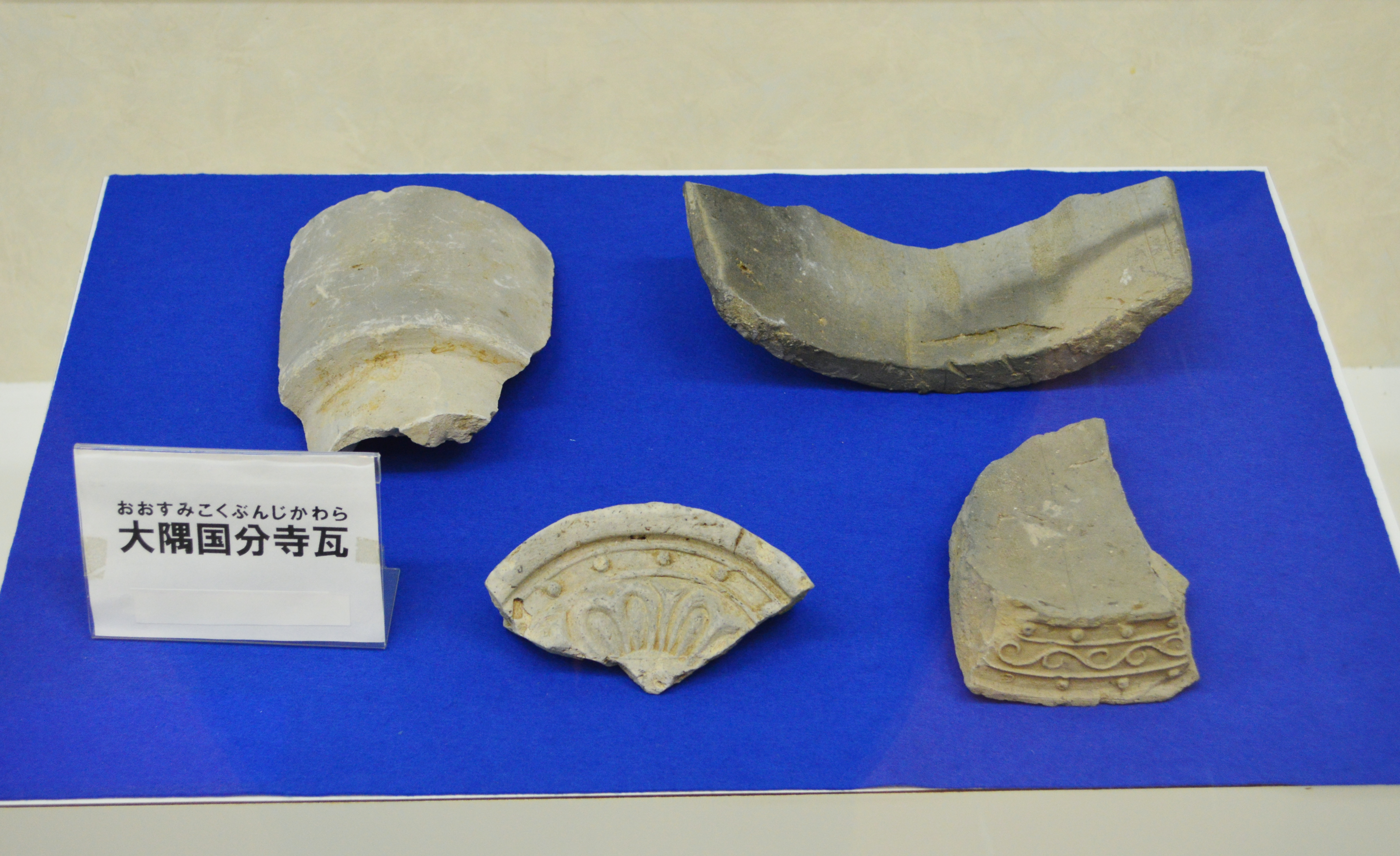
Roof tiles from Ōsumi Kokubun-ji site

=== Miyatagaoka Tile Kiln Ruins ===
More than 20,000 roof tile shards were found along with three underground noborigama climbing kilns at the Miyatagaoka Tile Kiln Ruins located in the Funatsu neighborhood of Aira City, located 15 kilometers west of the temple ruins. The site is approximately five kilometers upstream from the mouth of the Beppu River, and was built by hollowing out a hill that extended from the plateau on the right bank. Three kilns have been confirmed, and the remains of No. 3 kiln having a total length of approximately 6.34 meters.The floor has steps for filling the kiln with tiles, and the tiles remained in situ within the kiln are also visible. All of the tiles found at this sire are round tiles or eaves tiles, and there are no onigawara or shibi tiles. Since the patterns match the ones excavated from the Ōsumi Kokubun-ji site, it was determined that it was tile kiln associated with that temple. Despite the distance, it is assumed that the tiles were transported by boat along the Beppu River.

The Ōsumi Kokubun-ji site is about a 12-minute walk from Kokubu Station on the JR Kyushu Nippō Main Line. The Miyatagaoka Tile Kiln Ruins is approximately 21-minutes by car from Kinkō Station on the JR Kyushu Nippō Main Line.

== See also ==
- List of Historic Sites of Japan (Kagoshima)
- provincial temple
