= Aira District, Kagoshima =

District in Kagoshima prefecture, Japan

Aira (姶良郡, Aira-gun) is a district located in Kagoshima Prefecture, Japan. The current population is 11,420.

== Towns ==
The district has one town:

- Yūsui

== History ==
- April 1, 1889 - Due to the municipal status enforcement, the villages of Chōsa, Kajiki, Gamo, Mizobe, Shigetomi and Yamada were created within Aira District. (6 villages)
- April 1, 1897 – Aira District merges with Nishisoo (the villages of Fukuyama, Kokubu, Nishikokubu, Higashikokubu, Shikine, Shimizu, and Higashi襲山村) and Kuwahara Districts (the villages of Kurino, Yoshimatsu, Makizono, Yokogawa, Nishi襲山村). (18 villages)
- June 1, 1912 – The villages of Kajiki gained town status. (1 town, 17 villages)
- April 1, 1926 – The village of Kokubu gained town status. (2 towns, 16 villages)
- November 1, 1928 – The village of Kamou gained town status. (3 towns, 15 villages)
- October 10, 1929 – The village of Nishikokubu gained town status and renamed to become the town of Hayato. (4 towns, 14 villages)
- November 1, 1929 – The village of Fukuyama gained town status. (5 towns, 13 villages)
- November 1, 1930 – The village of 西襲山村 renamed the village of Hinatayama.
- April 1, 1932 – The village of Kurino gained town status. (6 towns, 12 villages)
- July 10, 1935 – The village of 東襲山村 renamed the village of Kirishima.
- February 16, 1940 – The town of Yokogawa gained town status. (7 towns, 11 villages)
- April 1, 1940 – The village of Makizono gained town status. (8 towns, 10 villages)
- April 1, 1942 – The village of Chōsa gained town status. (9 towns, 9 villages)
- April 1, 1950 – The village of 東襲山村 separated from the village of Kirishima. (9 towns, 10 villages)
- February 11, 1953 – The village of Yoshimatsu gained town status. (10 towns, 9 villages)
- May 3, 1953 – The village of Hinatayama gained town status. (11 towns, 8 villages)
- April 1, 1954 (10 towns, 6 villages)
  - The town of Kokubu and the villages of 東襲山村 and a part of Shimizu merged to form the town of Kokubu.
  - The town of Hayato and Hinatayama, and the remaining parts of village of Shimizu merged to form the town of Hayatohinatayama.
- May 10, 1954 - the town of Kokubu, and the villages of Higashikokubu and Shikine merged to form the town of Kokubu. (10 towns, 4 villages)
- January 1, 1955(10 towns, 2 villages)
  - The town of Chōsa, the village of Shigetomi, and parts of the village of Yamada merged to form the town of Aira.
  - The remaining parts of the village of Yamada merged into the town of Kamō.
- February 1, 1955 – The town of Kokubu gained city status.(9 towns, 2 villages)
- April 1, 1957 – The town of Hayatohinatayama changed their name to the town of Hayato.
  - November 3, 1958 – The village of Kirishima gained town status.(10 towns, 1 village)
  - April 1, 1959 – The village of Mizobe gained town status.(11 towns)
- March 22, 2005 – The towns of Kurino and Yoshimatsu merged to form the town of Yūsui.Í (10 towns)
- November 7, 2005 – The towns of Hayato, Fukuyama, Kirishima, Mizobe, Yokogawa, and Makizono merged with the city of Kokubu to form the city of Kirishima (4 towns)
- March 23, 2010 – The Aira District towns of Aira, Kajiki, and Kamō merged to form the city of Aira. Aira District is left with one municipality.
