= Kokubu, Kagoshima =

Dissolved municipality in Kagoshima prefecture, Japan

Kokubu (国分市, Kokubu-shi) was a city located in Kagoshima Prefecture, Japan. The city was founded on February 1, 1955.

As of 2003, the city had an estimated population of 55,237 and the density of 450.88 persons per km^{2}. The total area was 122.51 km^{2}.

On November 7, 2005, Kokubu, along with the towns of Kirishima (former), Fukuyama, Hayato, Makizono, Mizobe and Yokogawa (all from Aira District), was merged to create the city of Kirishima and no longer exists as an independent municipality.
