= Kumaso =

Historical ethnic group inhabiting southern Kyūshū

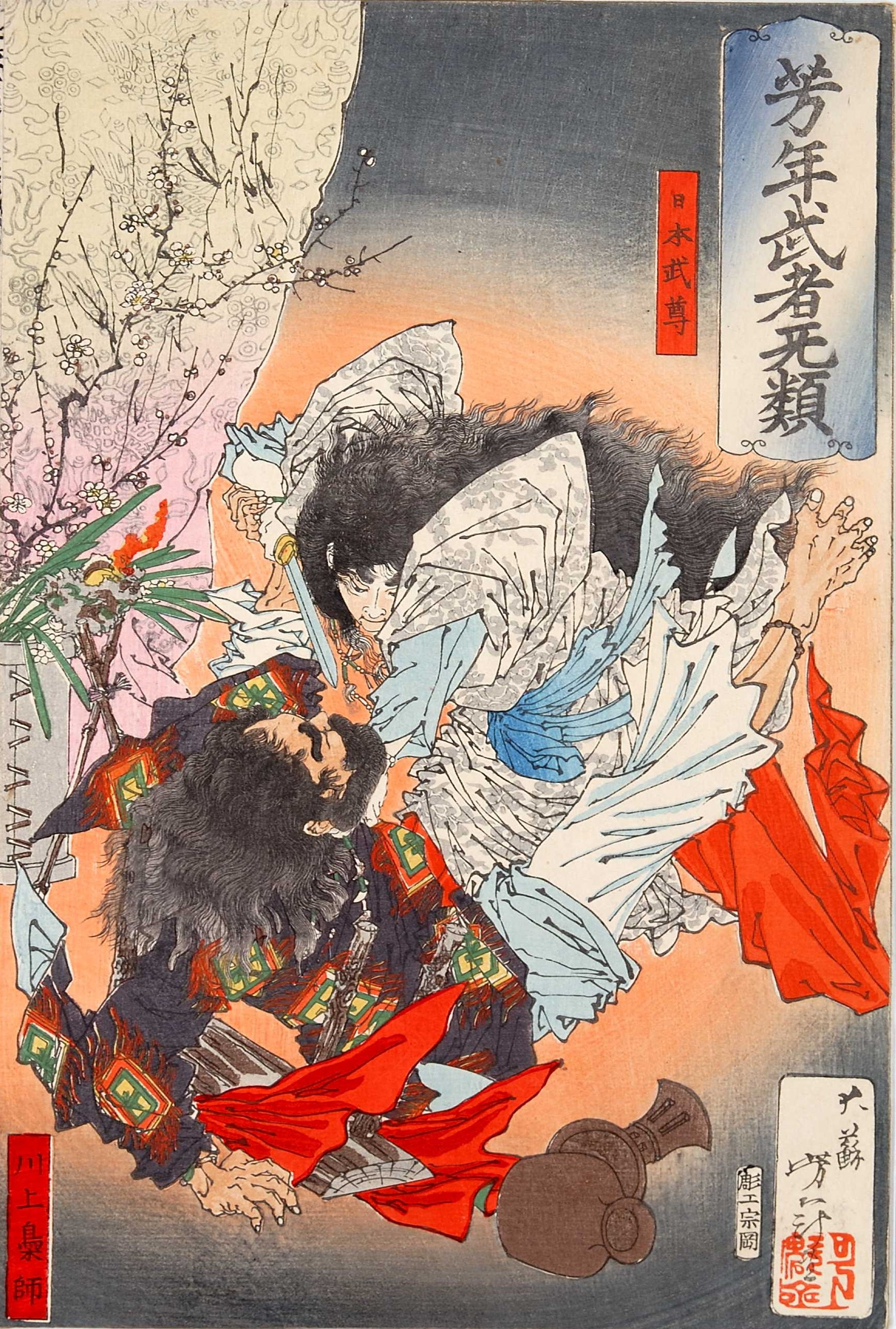
Prince Yamato Takeru attacking Kawakami Takeru (by Tsukioka Yoshitoshi)

The Kumaso (熊襲) were a prehistoric (semi-legendary) people of ancient Japan mentioned in the Kojiki, believed to have lived in the south of Kyūshū until at least the Nara period. The last leader of the Kumaso, Torishi-Kaya was killed by Yamato Takeru in 397. The name of Kumamoto Prefecture originates from the Kumaso people.

== Hypothesized origin ==
Scholars, such as Kakubayashi Fumio, "although information is extremely limited" concluded that they were of Austronesian origin based on some linguistic and cultural evidence, theorising that the word kaya, present in personal names or titles, such as Torishi-Kaya, has the same root as Tagalog kaya 'ability; capability; competence; resources; wealth' and Malay and Indonesian kaya 'rich, wealthy, having wealth'. The so in Kumaso was also hypothesized to share the same origin from proto-Austronesian Cau 'people', like Tagalog tao.

Alexander Vovin defended that the question of whether the Kumaso language was not a Japonic language is moot because not a single word of it is attested. He and Mark Hudson also theorised there is a probability that the Kumaso and the Hayato represented the same ethnic group. Arai Hakuseki argued that Japanese ancestors came from the Mahan confederacy, and that there was a possibility that Kumaso was from Goguryeo.

== Overview ==
William George Aston, in his translation of the Nihon Shiki, says Kumaso refers to two separate tribes, Kuma (meaning "bear") and So (written with the character for "attack" or "layer on"). In his translation of the Kojiki, Basil Hall Chamberlain records that the region is also known simply as So district, and elaborates on the Yamato-centric description of a "bear-like" people, based on their violent interactions or physical distinctiveness. The Tsuchigumo provide a better-known example of the transformation of other tribes into monsters. The term tsuchigumo "ground spider' is speculated to refer originally to the native pit dwellings of that people.

Geographically, Aston records that the Kumaso domain encompassed the historical provinces of Hyūga, Ōsumi, and Satsuma (contemporaneous with Aston's translation), or Miyazaki and Kagoshima prefectures.

According to the Nihon Shoki, the last leader of the Kumaso, Torishi-kaya, 'the Brave of Kawakami', was assassinated in the winter of 397 by the folk hero Yamato Takeru of Yamato, who was disguised as a woman at a banquet.

== Legacy ==
The word Kuma ('Bear') survives today as Kumamoto Prefecture ('source of the bear'), and Kuma District, Kumamoto. Kuma District is known for a distinct dialect, Kuma Dialect.

== People of the Kumaso mentioned in the Nihongi ==
- Torishi-Kaya (aka Brave of Kahakami): a leader of the Kumaso
- Atsukaya: a leader of the Kumaso
- Sakaya: a leader of the Kumaso
- Ichi-fukaya: Emperor Keikō married her 82 AD and in the same year put her to death, since she was involved in the assassination which killed her father.
- Ichi-kaya: younger sister of Ichi-fukaya

== See also ==
- Bear worship
- Hayato people
