= Index of Japan-related articles (M) =

This page lists Japan-related articles with romanized titles beginning with the letter M. For names of people, please list by surname (i.e., "Tarō Yamada" should be listed under "Y", not "T"). Please also ignore particles (e.g. "a", "an", "the") when listing articles (i.e., "A City with No People" should be listed under "City").

== Ma ==
- Mabi, Okayama
- Maborosi
- Machi Koro
- Machida, Tokyo
- Macross Plus
- Macross Seven
- Maebaru, Fukuoka
- Maebashi, Gunma
- Ai Maeda (actress)
- Ai Maeda (voice actress)
- Maeda Toshiie
- Maeda Toshinaga
- Maeda Toshitsune
- Maegashira
- Toshiyuki Maesaka
- Maetsue, Ōita
- Magatama
- Magic Knight Rayearth
- Magical girl
- Magical girlfriend
- Magical nyan-nyan Taruto
- Mahayana
- Maibara Station
- Maid in Japan
- Maihara, Shiga
- Mainichi Shimbun
- Mainland Japan
- Maisaka, Shizuoka
- Maison Ikkoku
- Maizuru, Kyoto
- Majutsushi Orphen
- Maki, Niigata (Kambara)
- Maki, Niigata (Kubiki)
- Makino Tsuyoshi
- Makino, Shiga
- The Makioka Sisters (film)
- The Makioka Sisters (novel)
- Makisu
- Makiyakinabe
- Makizono, Kagoshima
- Makurazaki, Kagoshima
- Malice Mizer
- MAWI
- Mampuku-ji
- Mana (musician)
- Man'yōshū
- Manchukuo
- Manchuria
- Maneki Neko
- Manga
- Mangaka
- Maniwa District, Okayama
- Manju (food)
- Manno, Kagawa
- Manriki
- Manzai
- Manzanar
- Maple Town
- Marco Polo Bridge Incident
- Maria-sama ga Miteru
- Mario
- Mario Kart 64
- Mario Kart: Double Dash
- Mario Party
- Mario's Super Picross
- Marmalade Boy
- Martial arts
- Martian Successor Nadesico
- Marugame, Kagawa
- Marunouchi
- Marvel vs. Capcom (series)
- Masaki, Ehime
- Masaki Toshimitsu Dannoshin
- Masaoka Shiki
- Mashiki, Kumamoto
- Mask of Glass
- Masked Rider (TV series)
- Masonna
- The Master of Go
- Master Roshi
- Master System
- Ken Masters
- Masuda, Shimane
- Masudaya
- Matama, Ōita
- Matcha
- Mathematics of paper folding
- Matsuo Bashō
- Takako Matsu
- Matsubara, Osaka
- Matsubase, Kumamoto
- Matsubayashi-ryu
- Matsudo, Chiba
- Matsue, Shimane
- Matsugaoka
- Hideki Matsui
- Iwane Matsui
- Kazuo Matsui
- Matsukata Masayoshi
- Matsumoto
- Matsumoto, Kagoshima
- Yukihiro Matsumoto
- Matsunaga Enzo
- Matsunaga Hisahide
- Matsuno, Ehime
- Yasumi Matsuno
- Matsunoyuki
- Matsuo Bashō
- Matsusaka, Mie
- Matsushige, Tokushima
- Matsushima, Kumamoto
- Matsushita Electric Industrial Co.
- Konosuke Matsushita
- Matsutake
- Yumi Matsutoya
- Matsuura, Nagasaki
- Matsuyama, Ehime
- Matsuyama, Kagoshima
- Daisuke Matsuzaka
- Matsuzaki, Shizuoka
- Matthew Calbraith Perry
- Matto, Ishikawa
- Mawashi
- Mawatari Matsuko
- Mazda
- Mazda MX-3
- Mazda RX-7
- Mazda RX-8

== Me ==
- Meadow (programming)
- Measure word
- Mecha
- Mechanical Engineering Heritage (Japan)
- Mega Man (series)
- Mega Man 64
- Megami Tensei
- Megatsunami
- Meguro Station
- Meguro, Tokyo
- Meigetsu-in
- Meiji period
- Meiji Constitution
- Meiji Restoration
- Meiji Shrine
- Setsuna Meioh
- Meiwa, Mie
- Memories (1995 film)
- Mentai Waido
- Menzan Zuihō
- Metal Gear (series)
- Metal Gear 2: Solid Snake
- Metal Gear Solid
- Metal Gear Solid 2: Sons of Liberty
- Metal Resistance
- Metal Slug
- Metroid
- Metroid Fusion
- Metroid Prime
- Metroid Prime 2: Echoes
- Metropolis (2001 movie)
- Mew
- Mew (Pokémon)
- Mewtwo

== Mi ==
- Michiko
- Midgar
- Mido
- Midori
- Midori, Hyogo
- Hikaru Midorikawa
- Midoriko
- Mie District, Mie
- Mie Prefecture
- Mie, Ōita
- Mifune, Kumamoto
- Mighty Morphin Power Rangers
- Migration in Japan
- Mighty the Armadillo
- Mihama, Aichi
- Mihama, Mie
- Mihama, Wakayama
- Mihara, Hiroshima
- Mihara, Hyogo
- Mihara, Kōchi
- Mihara, Osaka
- Mihara District, Hyogo
- Mihonoseki, Shimane
- Mii District, Fukuoka
- Miike District, Fukuoka
- Mikado
- Mikame, Ehime
- Mikamo, Okayama
- Mikamo, Tokushima
- Mikasa, Hokkaidō
- Mikata, Hyogo
- Mikata District, Hyogo
- Mikatsuki, Saga
- Mikawa Province
- Mikawa, Ehime
- Mikawa, Kumamoto
- Mikawa, Yamaguchi
- Mikazuki, Hyogo
- Miki
- Miki, Kagawa
- Takeo Miki
- Mikimoto Kōkichi
- Mikumo, Mie
- Haruhiko Mikimoto
- Mikkabi, Shizuoka
- Military history of Japan
- Millennium Items
- Mima, Ehime
- Mima, Tokushima
- Mima District, Tokushima
- Mimasaka Province
- Mimasaka, Okayama
- Mimata, Miyazaki
- Mimizuka
- Minabe, Wakayama
- Minabegawa, Wakayama
- Minakata Kumagusu
- Minakuchi, Shiga
- Minamata, Kumamoto
- Minamata disease
- Minami Torishima
- Minami-Alps, Yamanashi
- Minami-ku
- Minamiamabe District, Ōita
- Minamiashigara, Kanagawa
- Minamichita, Aichi
- Minamidaitō, Okinawa
- Minamiechizen, Fukui
- Minamiizu, Shizuoka
- Minamikawachi District, Osaka
- Minamimuro District, Mie
- Minaminaka District, Miyazaki
- Yoko Minamino
- Minamioguni, Kumamoto
- Minamishitara District, Aichi
- Minamitane, Kagoshima
- Minamiuwa District, Ehime
- Minamiyamashiro, Kyoto
- Minamoto clan
- Minamoto no Sanetomo
- Minamoto no Yoriie
- Minamoto no Yoritomo
- Minamoto no Yoshinaka
- Minamoto no Yoshitomo
- Minamoto no Yoshitsune
- Minato, Tokyo
- Minato Mirai 21
- Minato Mirai Line
- Minato-ku, Nagoya
- Minato-ku, Osaka
- Mine District, Yamaguchi
- Mine, Saga
- Mine, Yamaguchi
- Norman Mineta
- Ministry of International Trade and Industry
- Mino, Gifu
- Mino, Kagawa
- Mino, Tokushima
- Mino District, Hyogo
- Mino District, Shimane
- Mino Province
- Minokamo, Gifu
- Minoh, Osaka
- Yui Mizuno

== Mi (cont'd) ==
- Mirasaka, Hiroshima
- Mirin
- Miroku (InuYasha)
- Misaki, Ehime
- Misaki, Osaka
- Misakubo, Shizuoka
- Misasa, Tottori
- Misato, Akita
- Misato, Mie
- Misato, Saitama
- Misato, Tokushima
- Misato, Wakayama
- Misawa
- Misawa Air Base
- Misawa, Aomori
- Mishima, Kagoshima
- Mishima, Shizuoka
- Yukio Mishima
- Mishō, Ehime
- Mishima District, Osaka
- Mishima Sosen
- Miso
- Miso soup
- Misono, Mie
- Misty
- Misugi, Mie
- Yurika Misumaru
- Misumi, Kumamoto
- Misumi, Shimane
- Misumi, Yamaguchi
- Mitagawa, Saga
- Mitaka, Tokyo
- Mitake, Gifu
- Mito, Ibaraki
- Mito, Aichi
- Mito, Shimane
- Mito, Yamaguchi
- Mitoya, Shimane
- Mitoyo District, Kagawa
- Mitsu District, Okayama
- Mitsu, Hyogo
- Mitsubishi
- Mitsubishi A5M
- Mitsubishi A7M
- Mitsubishi Eclipse
- Mitsubishi F-2
- Mitsubishi F1M
- Mitsubishi Fuso Truck & Bus Corporation
- Mitsubishi G4M
- Mitsubishi GTO
- Mitsubishi Heavy Industries
- Mitsubishi J8M
- Mitsubishi Ki-202
- Mitsubishi Lancer Evolution
- Mitsubishi Motors Corporation
- Mitsubishi T-2
- Mitsubishi Zero
- Yasunori Mitsuda
- Mitsue, Nara
- Mitsugi District, Hiroshima
- Mitsugi, Hiroshima
- Mitsuhashi, Fukuoka
- Mitsui
- Mitsui O.S.K. Lines
- Kotono Mitsuishi
- Mitsuke, Niigata
- Mitsukoshi
- Mitsuru Igarashi
- Mitsuse, Saga
- Mitsuteru Yokoyama
- Miwa Yoshida
- Miwa, Aichi
- Miwa, Fukuoka
- Miwa, Hiroshima
- Miwa, Kyoto
- Miwa, Yamaguchi
- Miya Masaoka
- Miya, Gifu
- Miyagawa, Mie
- Kazuo Miyagawa
- Miyagi Prefecture
- Miyahara, Kumamoto
- Miyajima, Hiroshima
- Fusa Miyake
- Miyake, Nara
- Issey Miyake
- Miyaki District, Saga
- Miyako
- Miyako District, Fukuoka
- Miyako District, Okinawa
- Miyakubo, Ehime
- Miyanojo, Kagoshima
- Miyakonojō, Miyazaki
- Miyama, Kyoto
- Miyama, Mie
- Miyama, Wakayama
- Miyamoto Musashi
- Nobuko Miyamoto
- Yuriko Miyamoto
- Miyata, Fukuoka
- Miyatake Gaikotsu
- Miyazaki
- Miyazaki District, Miyazaki
- Hayao Miyazaki
- Miyazaki Prefecture
- Miyazaki, Miyazaki
- Kenji Miyazawa
- Kiichi Miyazawa
- Rie Miyazawa
- Miyazu, Kyoto
- Miyoshi District, Tokushima
- Miyoshi, Aichi
- Miyoshi, Hiroshima
- Miyoshi, Tokushima
- Mizobe, Kagoshima
- Kenji Mizoguchi
- Mizokuchi, Tottori
- Tetsuya Mizuguchi
- Mizuho Bank
- Mizuho Financial Group
- Mizuho, Gifu
- Mizuho, Kyoto
- Mizuho, Shimane
- Mizukami, Kumamoto
- Mizuma District, Fukuoka
- Mizuma, Fukuoka
- Mizumaki, Fukuoka
- Mizunami, Gifu
- Ami Mizuno
- Mizuno Nobumoto
- Mizuno Tadakuni
- Mizuno Tadashige
- Mizusawa, Iwate

== Mo ==
- Mobara, Chiba
- Mobile Suit Gundam
- Mobile Suit Gundam: Char's Counterattack
- Mobile Suit Gundam ZZ
- Mobile Suit Victory Gundam
- Mobile Suit Zeta Gundam
- Moblog
- Mochi (food)
- Kaori Mochida
- Mochigase, Tottori
- Modern Love's Silliness
- Moe (slang)
- Mamoru Mohri
- Moi dix Mois
- Mojibake
- Momotarō
- Momoyama, Wakayama
- Momozono
- Mon (emblem)
- Monā
- Mona Font
- Monbetsu, Hokkaidō
- Monkey (TV series)
- Monobe, Kochi
- Akiko Monō
- Monster (manga)
- Montevideo Maru
- Mooka, Tochigi
- Mora (linguistics)
- More Than Kawaii
- Mori, Shizuoka
- Mori Chack
- Mōri clan
- Mori Hiromichi
- Ikue Mori
- Masahiro Mori
- Momoe Mori
- Mōri Motonari
- Mori Ōgai
- Mōri Terumoto
- Yoshirō Mori
- Moriguchi, Osaka
- Masaharu Morimoto
- Morioka, Iwate
- Akio Morita
- Morita Shoma
- Moriya, Ibaraki
- Moriyama, Shiga
- Daidō Moriyama
- Morodomi, Saga
- Morotsuka, Miyazaki
- Hiroyuki Morioka
- Mothra
- Mothra vs Godzilla
- Motobu, Okinawa
- Motoori Norinaga
- Motosu, Gifu
- Motosu District, Gifu
- Motoyama, Kōchi
- Mount Fuji
- Mount Fuji Jazz Festival
- Mount Hiei
- Mount Kōya
- Mount Ōmine
- Mount Rokkō
- Mount Suribachi
- Mount Tsurugi (Tokushima)
- Mount Tsurugi (Hokkaido)

== Mr ==
- Mr Driller
- Mr. Baseball
- Mr.Children
- Mr. Game & Watch
- Mr. Moto
- Mr. Satan
- Mr. Saturn

== Ms ==
- MSX

== Mu ==
- Mu (negative)
- Mugegawa, Gifu
- Mugi District, Gifu
- Mugi, Gifu
- Mugi, Tokushima
- Muikaichi, Shimane
- Mujo
- Chiaki Mukai
- Mukaishima, Hiroshima
- Muko
- Munakata District, Fukuoka
- Munakata, Fukuoka
- Municipalities of Japan
- Municipality
- Kazusa Murai
- Murakami
- Murakami, Niigata
- Haruki Murakami
- Ryū Murakami
- Senshō Murakami
- Murakami Yoshikiyo
- Muraoka, Hyōgo
- Murasaki Shikibu
- Murayama
- Murayama Kaita
- Tomiichi Murayama
- Mure, Kagawa
- Muro, Nara
- Muromachi period
- Muroran, Hokkaidō
- Muroto, Kōchi
- Musashi, Ōita
- Musashi Province
- Musashi University
- Musashimaru Kōyō
- Musashimurayama, Tokyo
- Musashino, Tokyo
- Mushiki
- Music of Japan
- Musō Soseki
- Izumi Muto
- Yugi Mutou
- Japanese battleship Mutsu
- Mutsu (nuclear ship)
- Mutsu, Aomori
- Mutsu Munemitsu
- Mutsu Province
- Mutsumi, Yamaguchi

== My ==
- My Neighbor Totoro
- Myoan Eisai
- Myōdō District, Tokushima
- Myōe
- Myoga
- Myōzai District, Tokushima
