= Mongolian horse =

Breed of horse

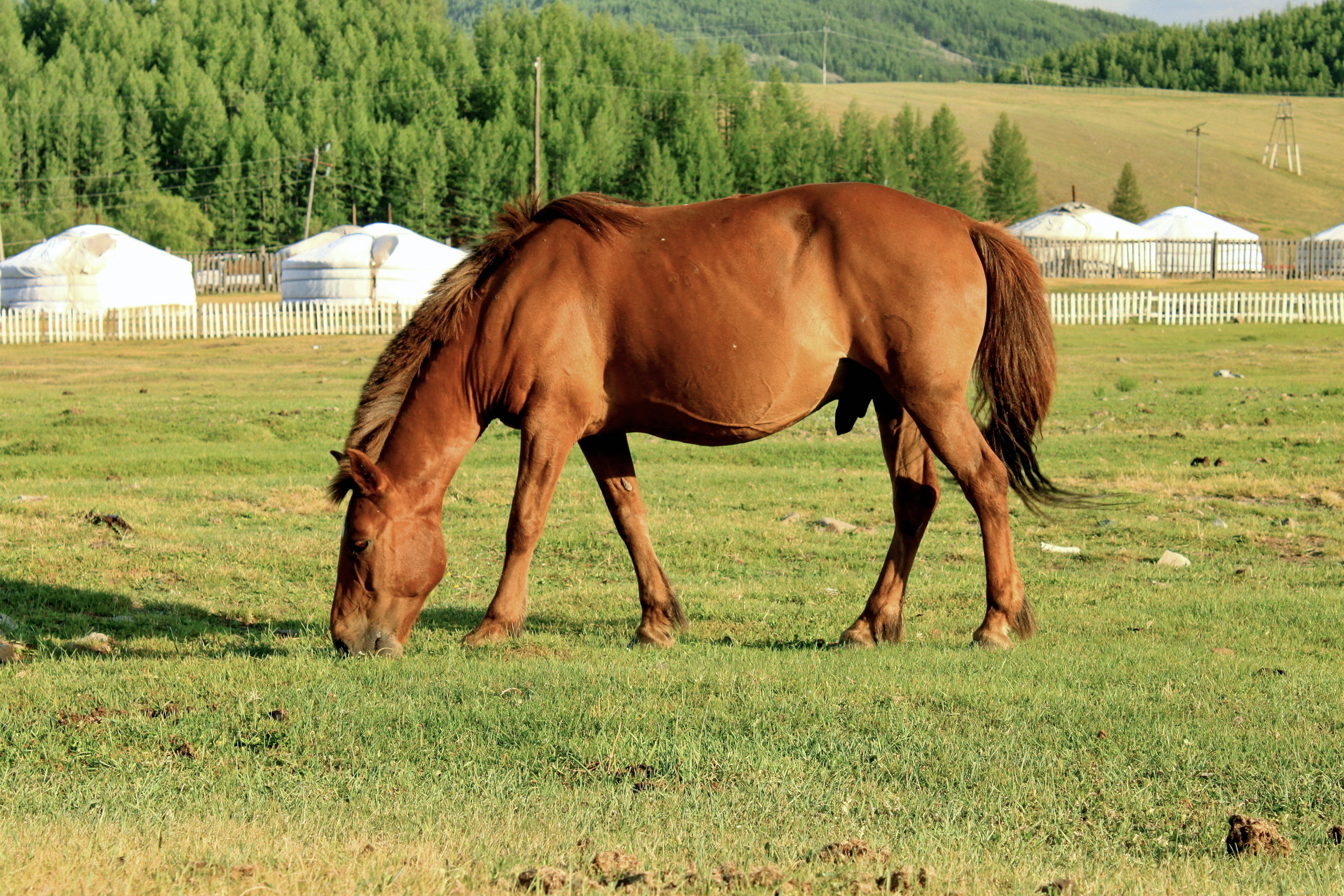

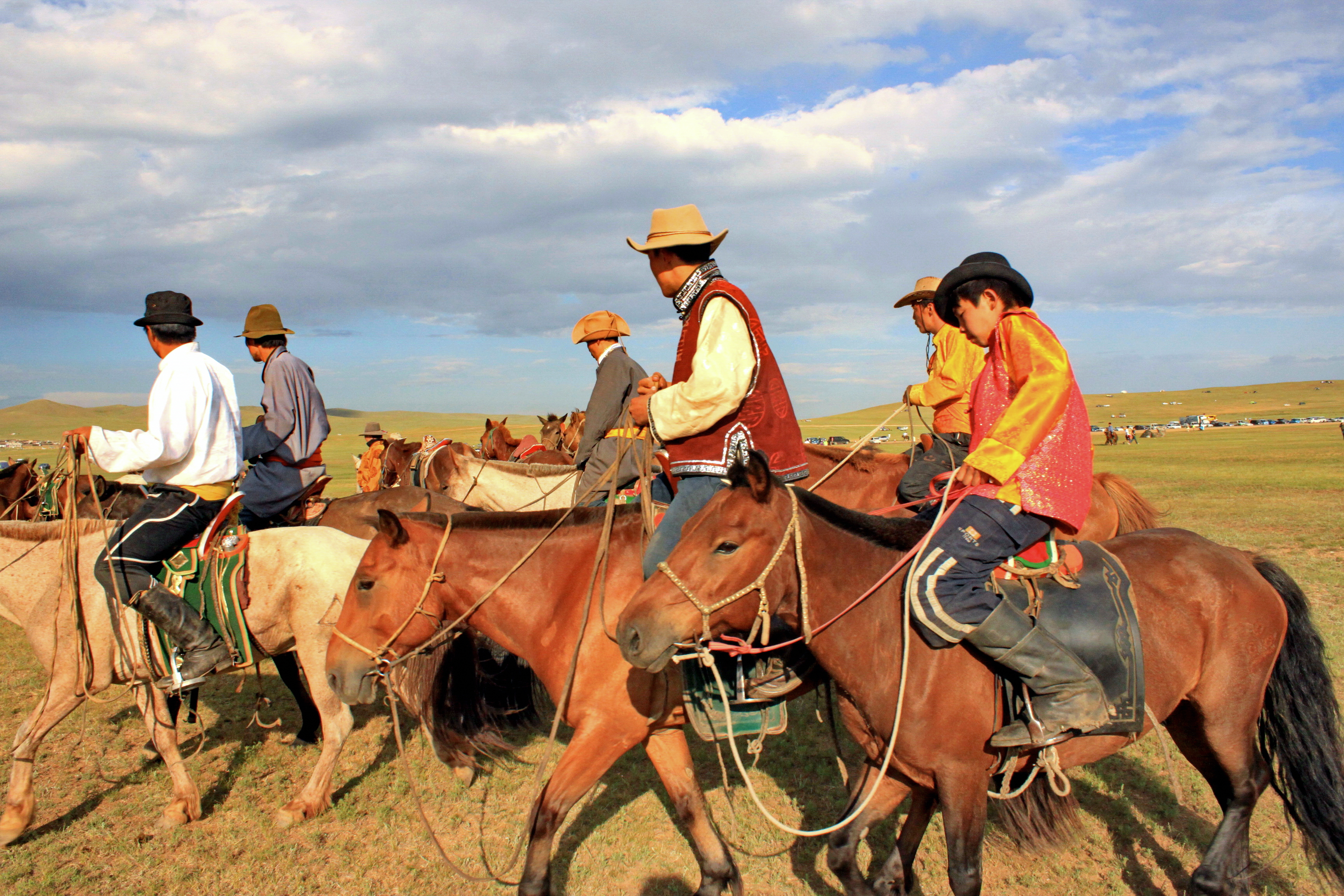
- Country of origin: Mongolia; Northern China (Inner Mongolia)

Traits
- Distinguishing features: Small but sturdy build, stamina, hardiness in extreme conditions, genetic variation

The Mongolian horse (Mongolian Адуу, aduu: "horse" or mori; or as a herd, ado) is the native horse breed of Mongolia. The breed is purported to be largely unchanged since the time of Genghis Khan. Nomads living in the traditional Mongol fashion still hold more than 3 million animals, which outnumber the country's human population. In Mongolia, the horses live outdoors all year, dealing with temperatures from 30 °C (86 °F) in summer down to −40 °C (−40 °F) in winter, and they graze and search for food on their own. The mare's milk is processed into the national beverage airag. Some animals are slaughtered for meat. Other than that, they serve as riding and transport animals; they are used both for the daily work of the nomads and in horse racing.

Mongol horses were a key factor supporting the 13th-century conquests of the Mongol Empire.

== Characteristics ==
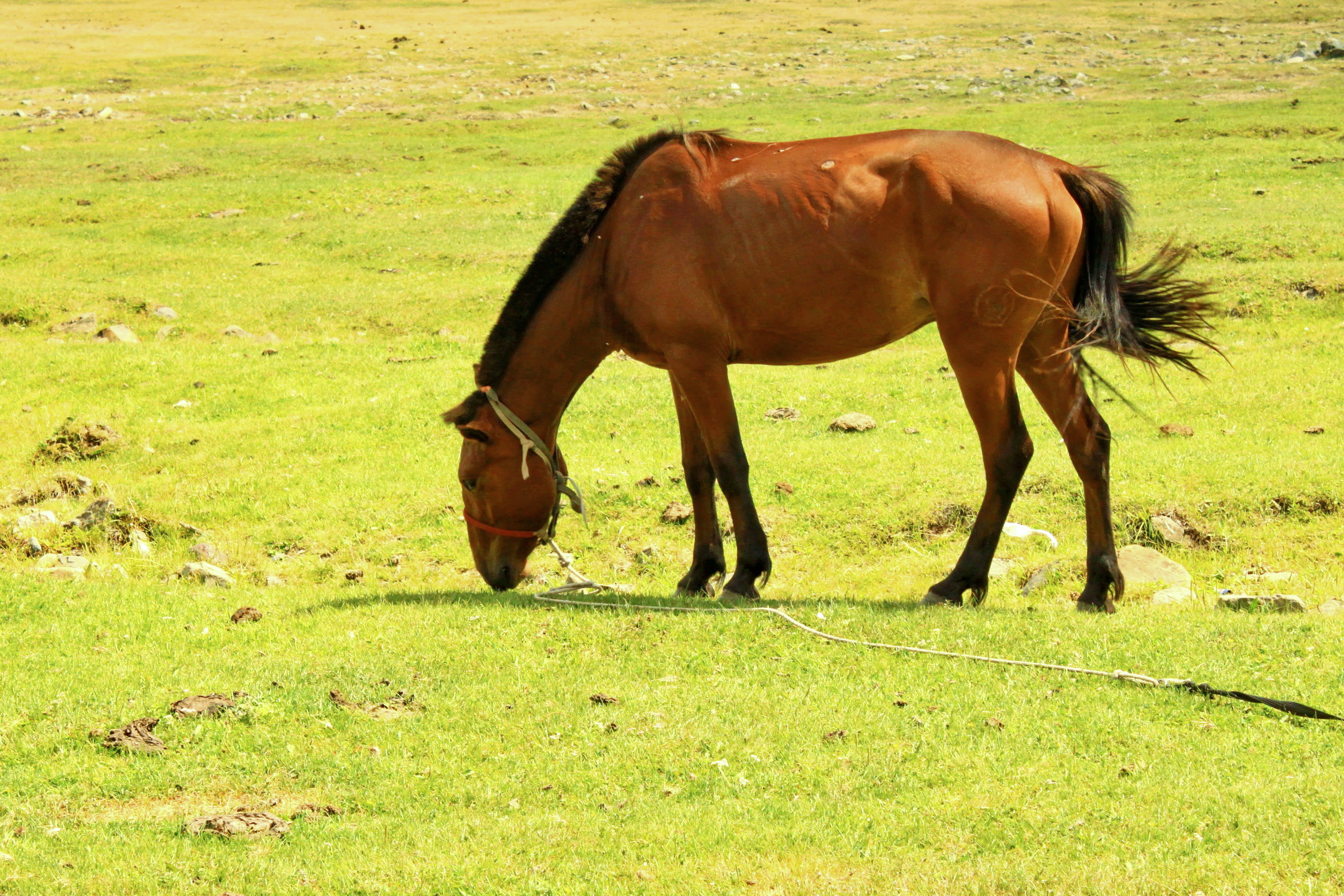
A Mongolian horse grazing.

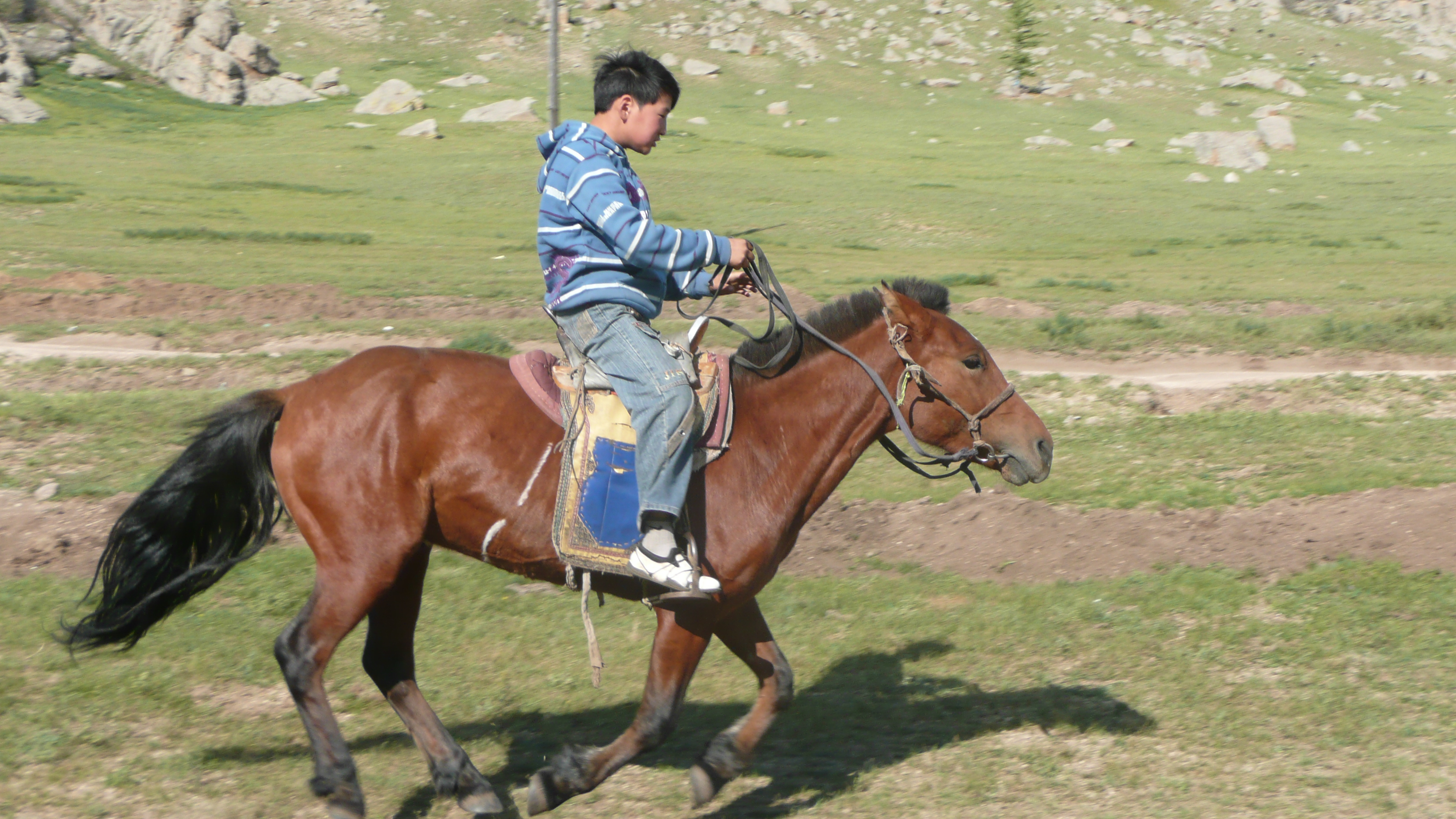
A person riding a Mongolian horse.

Mongol horses are of a stocky build, with relatively short but strong legs and a large head. They weigh about 500 to 600 lbs. and range in size from 14 to 15 hands (56 to 60 inches, 142 to 152 cm) high. Their cannon bone external circumference is about 8 inches (200 mm). They have a slight resemblance to Przewalski's horse and were once believed to have originated from that subspecies. However, that theory was disproven in 2011 by genetic testing. The question whether Przewalski's horse is an ancestor of any domestic horse is still being debated, though it can interbreed with domesticated horses to hybridize and produce fertile offspring. Of the caballine equines, E. ferus, only E. ferus ferus, also known as the European wild horse, shares ancestry with the modern domestic horse.

The mane and tail of the Mongol horse are very long. Their strands are often used for braiding ropes; the tail hair can be used for violin bows. Mongolian horses have great stamina; although they have small bodies, they can gallop for 10 km without a break. When pulling a cart, a team of four Mongol horses can draw a load of 4400 lbs for 50–60 km a day. Because the horses are allowed to live much the same as wild horses, they require little in the way of hoof care. The hooves are left untrimmed and unshod, and few farriers are in the country. Mongol horses have hard, strong hooves and seldom have foot problems. Sometimes, horses will be branded.

Horses from different regions of Mongolia are considered to have different traits. Desert horses are said to have larger feet than average ("like camel's feet"). Mountain horses are short and particularly strong. Steppe horses are the tallest, fastest variety of Mongol horses. Specifically, the eastern Khentii Province and Sükhbaatar Province steppe provinces are widely considered to produce the fastest horses in the country. Darkhad horses are known for their strength. A Darkhad horse weighing only 250 kg can carry a load of 300 kg—the equivalent of carrying another horse on its back. On a broader level, some Mongolian provinces are considered to be more suitable for horse rearing than others. The eastern steppe provinces are informally known as the "horse provinces" because of their suitability for horse breeding. The northern mountain provinces are considered "cow provinces", though horses are reared there, as well.

A wide variety of horse colorations are seen. People in the different regions of Mongolia favor different colors of horses and breed accordingly. The Darkhad ethnic group prefers white horses, however most Mongolians prefer dun, bay, or black horses and shun white-colored animals. Some horses are bred for the preferences of foreign markets. Elizabeth Kendall, travelling through southern Mongolia in 1911, wrote, "I was struck by the number of white and grey ponies, and was told that horses are bred chiefly for the market in China, and this is the Chinese preference." She also observed that the northern Mongolian herds near Tuerin seemed to consist mainly of black and chestnut horses.

Herdsmen breed horses primarily for color and speed, but also for conformation, disposition, and lineage. In Mongolia, conformation is not stressed so strongly as it is in Western culture. However, a few traits are preferred in a horse. When walking, a horse should leave hind footprints that fall upon or outside the fore footprints. A desirable animal should also have a large head, thick bones, a large barrel, thick legs, be tall (but not so tall as to impede winter survival), possess a thick coat for cold resistance, have a thick mane and tail, and a Roman nose; the latter is considered important because dish-faced horses are considered to have difficulty grazing.

Mongol horses are frugal, hardy, somewhat wily, and tread safely in rough terrain. In Mongolia, most animals are kept roaming free, and only a small number of riding animals are caught and tethered. A nomad's herd of horses hangs out around the family's dwelling, typically grazing several kilometres away. The herd is allowed to choose its own pasturage with little interference from the owners. They may disappear for days at a time, and eventually the owners go out to look for them. Once a horse has become familiar with carrying a rider, it will be calm, friendly, and very reliable. Because nature provides so well for Mongol horses, they cost little to nothing to raise. They are a practical necessity of everyday life, in which a substantial portion of the population still lives as nomads. Herdsmen regard their horses as both a form of wealth and a source of the daily necessities: transportation, food, and drink.

The horses typically eat nothing but grass and require very little water, a trait useful for survival in environments like the Gobi desert. A horse may drink only once a day. In the winter, Mongol horses paw up the snow to eat the grass underneath. For water, they eat snow.

During the winter and early spring, horses lose about 30% of their body weight. They must regain this weight during summer and fall so as to survive another year. During particularly hard winters ("zuds"), horses may starve to death en masse or die of exposure. Herdsmen can do little to save their herds in such conditions. In the bitter winter of 2009–2010, 188,270 Mongol horses perished. Despite their life in semi-feral conditions, most horses live to be 20 – 40 years old.

The horse is believed to have been first domesticated somewhere in the Eurasian Steppe. Never have all the horses in Mongolia been domesticated at once; rather, wild and domesticated horses coexisted and interbred, so verifiably "true" wild blood no longer exists in the Mongol horses of today. However, although not considered true wild horses in the same sense as Przewalski's horse, some feral Mongolian horses browse the steppe alongside their semiferal domesticated kin. Unlike the mustangs that roam the West in the United States, which are categorized as a non-native species, feral Mongol horses are living in the same manner and place as where their ancestors had run and lived for hundreds of thousands of years. Occasionally, the nomads capture feral horses to add to their herds.

== Breed history ==
The origins of the Mongolian breed are hard to determine. The split between Przewalski's horse and E. ferus caballus is estimated to have occurred 120,000– 240,000 years ago, long before domestication. Nomads of the central Asian steppes have been documented as riding horses since 2000 BC.

Tests have shown, that among all horse breeds, Mongol horses feature the largest genetic variety, followed by the Tuvan horses. A comparison of Mongol horses, Japanese horses, and Arab Anglo/Thoroughbred horses found that Mongol horses had the highest genetic diversity, with a heterozygosity ranging from 0.75 to 0.77. Compared to low heterozygosity values for Thoroughbreds (0.461), Arabians (0.478) and the bottlenecked Przewalski's horse (0.474), the genetic diversity of the Mongol horses is exceptional. This indicates that it is a very archaic breed suffering little human-induced selection.

The data also indicate that many other breeds descend from the Mongol horses. The Mongolian horse is theorized to be the founding stock for many other horse breeds in Asia, including the Tuvinian, Akhaltekin, Yunan, Japanese and Cheju.

The thirteenth-century archbishop Giovanni da Pian del Carpine was one of the first Westerners to describe Mongol horses, observing, "...[they] are not very great in stature, but exceedingly strong, and maintained with little provender".

A 1918 census of Mongolian animals found 1,500,000 horses.

=== Crossbreeding ===
Recently, breeders have begun importing expensive foreign racehorse breeds like Arabians and Thoroughbreds with the goal of breeding them to native stock to produce faster horses, but these relatively fragile breeds are unable to survive on the steppe like Mongolian horses can; if left unsheltered, such horses inevitably freeze to death or starve. So, breeders have focused on created crossbreeds between foreign horses and native Mongolian stock. The ultimate goal is to produce a race horse that has one-quarter foreign blood and three-quarters Mongolian blood; this proportion is believed to create a horse hardy enough to survive in Mongolia and combine the Mongolian horse's stamina and endurance with foreign speed to produce a new breed with the best qualities of both.

One of the drawbacks to breeding such crosses is that the foreign stallion is much larger than the smaller Mongolian mare. This results in large foals that can be difficult for the small mares to birth. Since Mongolian mares typically give birth on their own without human supervision—and seldom have problems doing so—breeders have little experience on how to deal with the birthing problems that result due to the size of the crossed foals. To reduce birthing problems, a foreign mare could be bred to a native stallion to avoid the large foal problem, but in practice this reduces the numbers of crossbreed foals that can be produced each year. In one breeding season, a foreign stallion can impregnate 10 native mares and produce 10 crossed foals, but a foreign mare can only be impregnated by a native stallion once and produce one crossed foal.

=== Japan ===
Mongol horses have been theorized to be the founding stock for Japan's native horse breeds. Breeds such as the Misaki, Taishu, Tokara, Kiso, Yonaguni, Noma, Hokkaido, and Miyako are believed to be the descendants of distant Mongolian ancestors.

=== Northern Europe and Iceland ===
Genetic analyses have revealed links between the Mongolian horse and breeds in Iceland, Scandinavia, Central Europe, and the British Isles. The Mongol horses are believed to have been originally imported from Russia by Swedish traders; this imported Mongol stock subsequently became the basis for the Norwegian Fjord horse and a variety of other Scandinavian breeds, including the Nordland. One of these breeds was eventually exported to Iceland by settlers, producing the modern day Icelandic horse, which bears a strong resemblance to the Mongol horse and lives in much the same way, foraging freely off the land during all seasons. The Exmoor, Scottish Highland, Shetland, and Connemara pony breeds have also been found to be related to the Icelandic horse, suggesting that all these northern European breeds had ancestors that grazed on the steppe of Mongolia.

== Uses ==
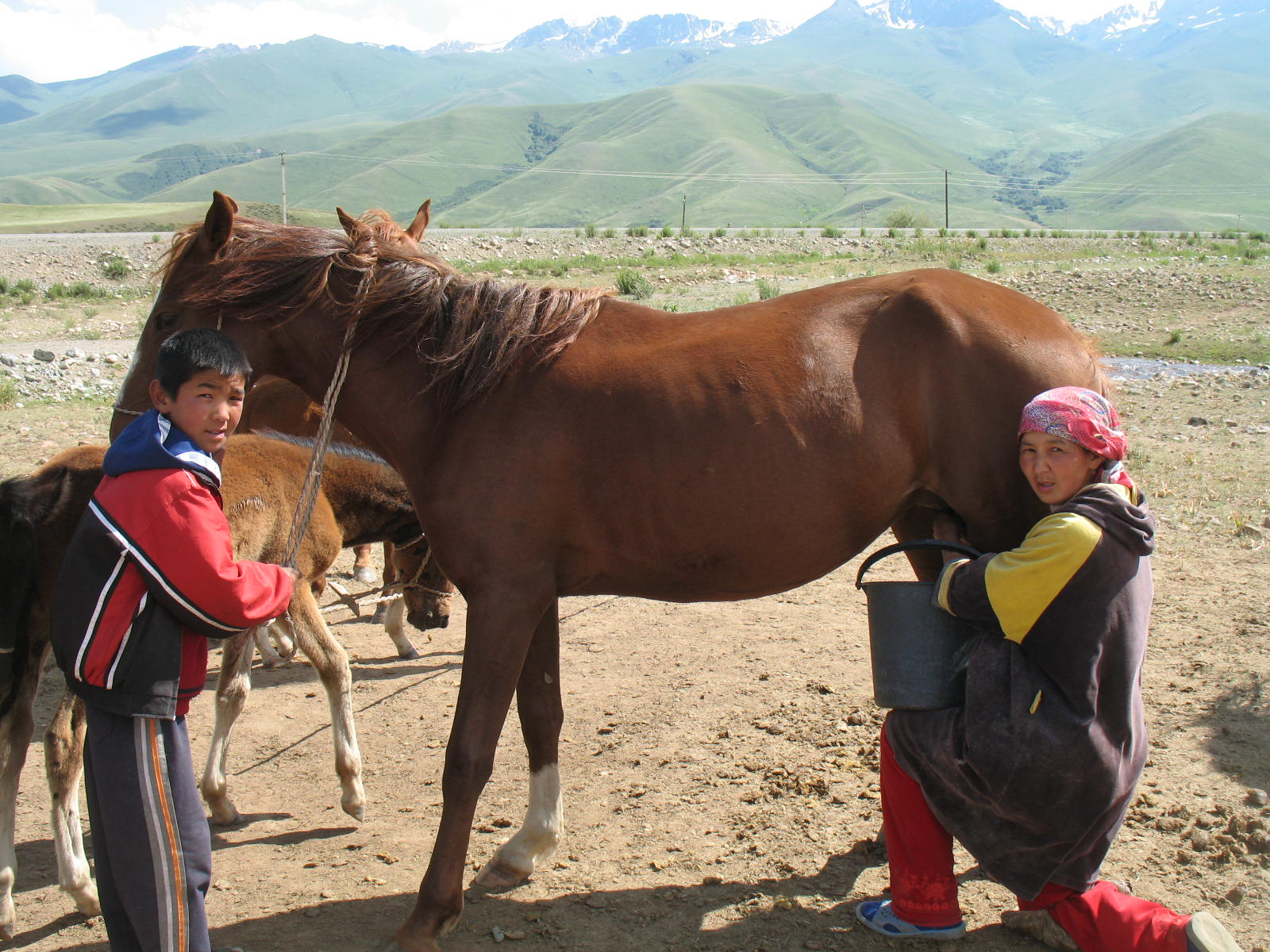
Mare being milked in Suusamyr, Kyrgyzstan

Mongolian horses are valued for their milk, meat, and hair. In the summer, mares are milked six times a day, once every two hours. A mare produces an average of 0.11 lbs of milk each time, with a yearly production of 662 lbs total. The milk is used to make the ubiquitous fermented drinks of Mongolia, airag and kumis. Horse meat is considered the healthiest, most delicious kind of meat. Each 600-lb Mongol horse yields about 240 lb of meat. The horse's hair can be used for a number of products, including rope, fiddle strings, and a variety of ornaments. Horse dung is used for camp fuel.

=== As warhorses ===
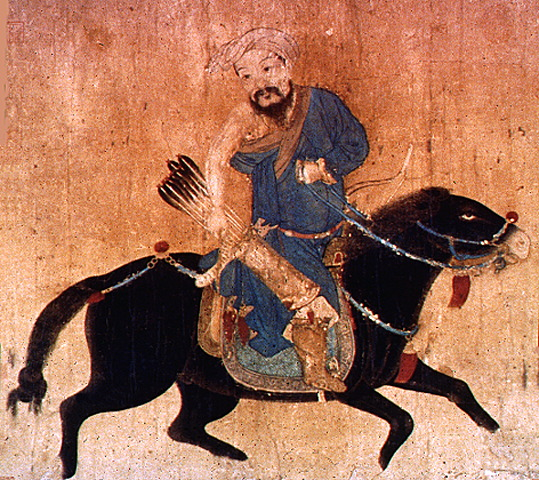
A Mongol archer

Mongol horses are best known for their role as the war steeds of Genghis Khan. The Mongol soldier relied on his horses to provide him with food, drink, transportation, armor, shoes, ornamentation, bowstring, rope, fire, sport, music, hunting, entertainment, spiritual power, and in case of his death, a mount to ride in the afterlife. Mongol horses made excellent warhorses because of their hardiness, stamina, self-sufficiency, and ability to forage on their own. The main disadvantage of the Mongol horse as a war steed was that it was slower than some of the other breeds it faced on the battlefield. Soldiers preferred to ride lactating mares because they could use them as milk animals. In times of desperation, they would also slit a minor vein in their horse's neck and drain some blood into a cup. This they would drink either "plain" or mixed with milk or water. A Mongol warrior's horse would come at his whistle and follow him around, dog-like. Each warrior would bring a small herd of horses with him (three to five being average, but up to 20) as remounts. They alternated horses so that they always rode a fresh horse.

=== Racing, riding, and tack ===
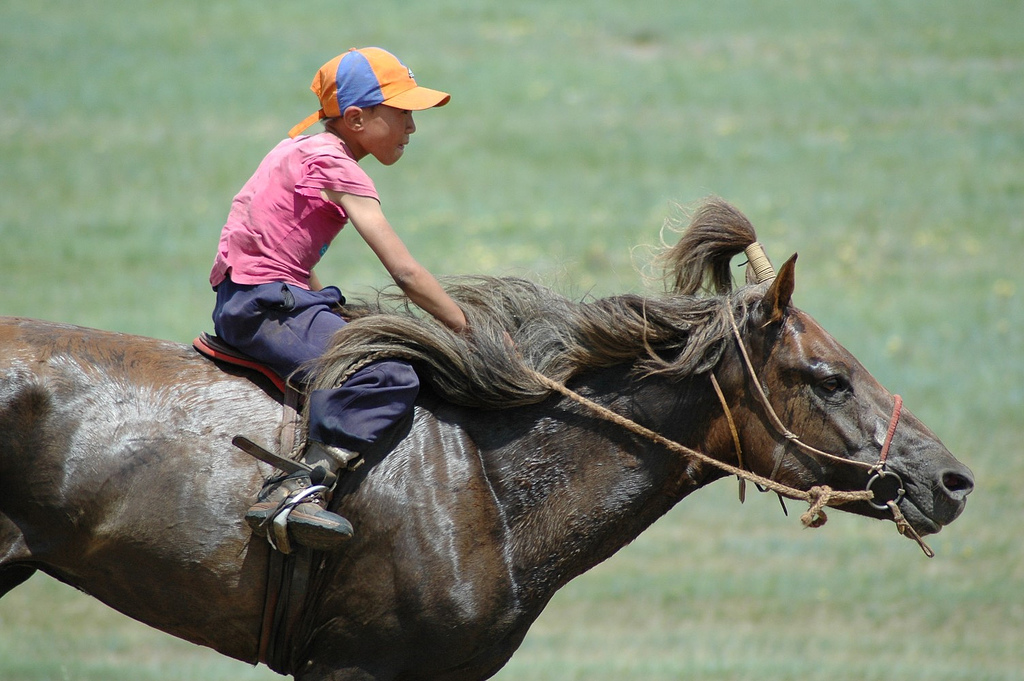
Child racing at the Naadam festival. The horse's forelock is put up into a topknot in the traditional race style.

Horse racing is one of the "three manly arts". Horse racing is the second-most popular event in Mongolia, after traditional wrestling. Mongolian races are long, up to 30 km, and can involve thousands of horses. The native horses have excellent endurance. Though foreign breeds are faster than Mongolian horses, they are usually exhausted by the end of the run, while the Mongolian horses still have wind. Nevertheless, horses have died of exhaustion during the Naadam race on occasion.

In Mongolia, racing is a people's sport where everyone participates. Each family selects the best horse from their herd and takes it to the fair to race. However, in recent years, the introduction of fast foreign crossbreeds has changed the sport. Only the richest breeder can afford to buy and raise a Thoroughbred/Mongolian mix, and such horses tend to win races. This has led to complaints that ordinary people no longer have a chance to win, and that racing has become the province of the elite. Racing horses with a child in the saddle run in full gallop over 35 km at a time. Children are used instead of adults because they are lighter. Mongolians are not so much concerned with the skill and experience of a jockey as the ability of the horse.

Mongolian nomads have long been considered to be some of the best horsemen in the world. During the time of Genghis Khan, Mongol horse archers were capable of feats such as sliding down the side of their horses to shield their bodies from enemy arrows, while simultaneously holding their bows under the horses' chins and returning fire, all at full gallop. The education of a modern Mongolian horseman begins in childhood. Parents place their children on a horse and hold them there before they can even hang on without assistance. By age 6, children can ride in races; by age 10, they are learning to make their own tack. Materials such as books on horse training or medical care are uncommon and seldom used. Information is passed down orally from parent to child.

A variety of rules for how tack and horses should be handled are known. For example, it was taboo to use the whip as a prop or to touch an arrow to the whip; such crimes were punishable by death. In Genghis Khan's time, strict rules dictated the way horses were to be used on campaign. The Khan instructed his general Subutai, "See to it that your men keep their crupper hanging loose on their mounts and the bit of their bridle out of the mouth, except when you allow them to hunt. That way they won't be able to gallop off at their whim [tiring out the horses unnecessarily]. Having established these rules--see to it you seize and beat any man who breaks them. ... Any man...who ignores this decree, cut off his head where he stands."

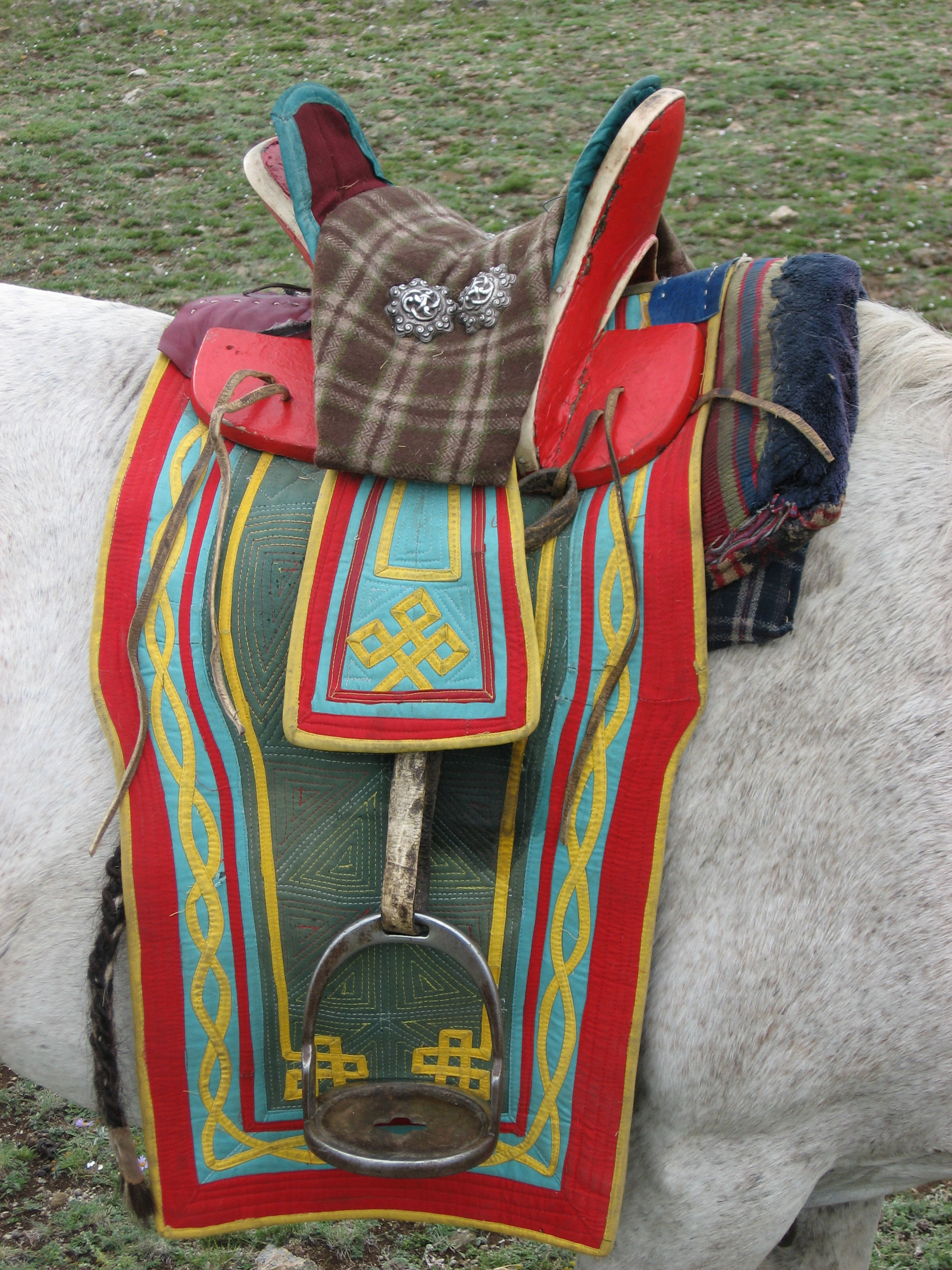
Mongolian saddle, showing short stirrups, high pommel, cantle, and distinctive metal discs

Mongolian tack differs from Western tack in being made almost completely of rawhide and using knots instead of metal connectors. Tack design follows a "one size fits all" approach, with saddles, halters, and bits all produced in a single size. Mongolian tack is very light compared to western tack. The modern Mongolian riding saddle is tall, with a wooden frame and several decorated metal disks that stand out from the sides. It has a high pommel and cantle and short stirrups. Riders frequently stand in the stirrups while riding.

The Mongolian saddle, both medieval and modern, has short stirrups rather like those used on modern race horses. The design of the stirrups makes it possible for the rider to control the horse with his legs, leaving his hands free for tasks like archery or holding a catch-pole.

=== Cultural context ===
The Mongols have many stories and songs about horses. Legendary horses include magical flying steeds, beloved horses that visit in dreams, and a rich body of folklore about equine protagonists. The horse has long played a role as a sacred animal, and Mongols have a variety of spiritual beliefs regarding them. The mane is believed to contain a horse's spirit and strength; for this reason, the mane of stallions is always left uncut. Mare's milk has been used in ceremonies of purification, prayer, and blessing since antiquity. In modern times, it continues to be used in a variety of ceremonies associated with racing. Historically, horses were sacrificed on special occasions; 40 horses were sacrificed at the funeral of Genghis Khan. When a horse is killed, a variety of rituals may be followed to honor the remains. Horses are believed to have spirits that can help or hurt their owner after death. When a deceased horse's spirit is content, the owner's herd will flourish; if not, then the herd will fail.

Of the five kinds of herd animals typically recognized in Mongolia (horses, camels, oxen/yaks, sheep, and goats), horses are seen to have the highest prestige. A nomad with many horses is considered wealthy. Mongolians do not give their horses names; rather, they identify them by their color, markings, scars, and brands. Over 500 words in the Mongolian language describe the traits of horses.

== See also ==
- Chinese Mongolian horse
- Horses in East Asian warfare
- Kalmyk horse
- Przewalski's horse
- Sergeant Reckless (c. 1948–1968), a Mongolian mare and decorated war horse that served with the United States Marine Corps in the Korean War.
- Yakutian horse
