= List of Japanese horse breeds =

This is a list of the horse breeds usually considered to be native to Japan. Some may have complex or obscure histories, so inclusion here does not necessarily imply that a breed is predominantly or exclusively Japanese. In Japanese, this breed group is called kokunaiuma (国内産馬, 'domestic horse').

== Breeds ==
English name	Japanese name	Notes	Image
Dosanko	道産子, dosanko	also called Hokkaido Horse	
Kiso	木曽馬, kiso uma		
Misaki	岬馬, misaki uma		
Miyako	宮古馬, miyako uma	Native to Miyako Island.	
Noma	野間馬, noma uma	Native to the island of Shikoku.	
Tokara	トカラ馬, tokara uma	Native to the Tokara Islands.	
Taishū	対州馬, taishū uma	Native to Tsushima Island.	
Yonaguni	与那国馬, yonaguni uma	Native to the island of Yonaguni, it is the smallest Japanese horse breed.	

== Cross-breeds ==
Under certain conditions, cross-bred horses developed from existing breeds can be registered in one of five categories:

- Japanese draught, 日本輓系種
- Japanese sports horse, 日本スポーツホース種
- Japanese riding horse, 日本乗系種
- Japanese pony, 日本ポニー種
- Japanese miniature horse, 日本ミニチュアホース.
