= Noma horse =

Japanese breed of horse

Noma
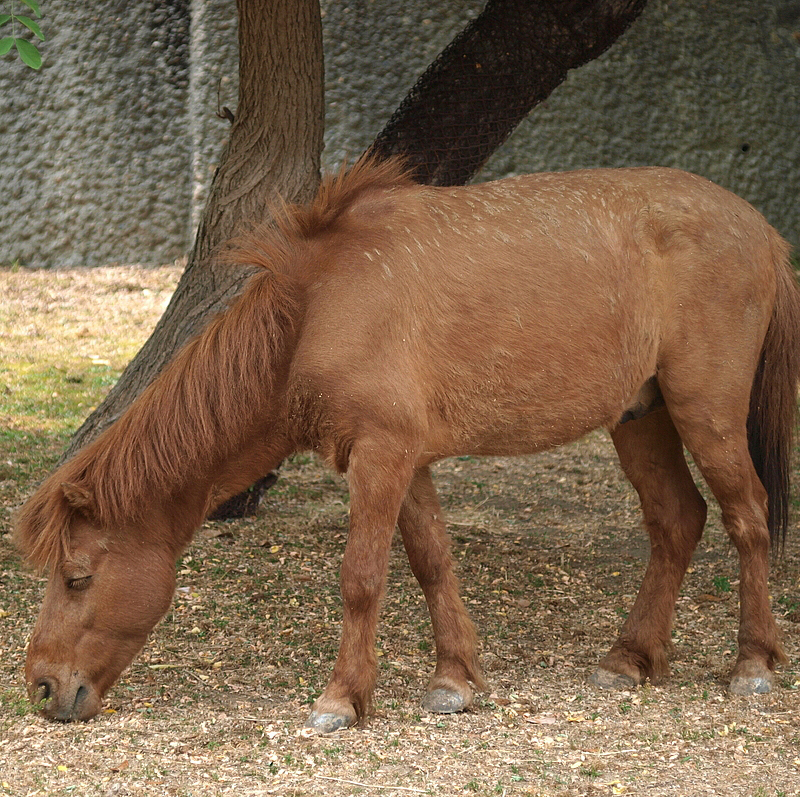

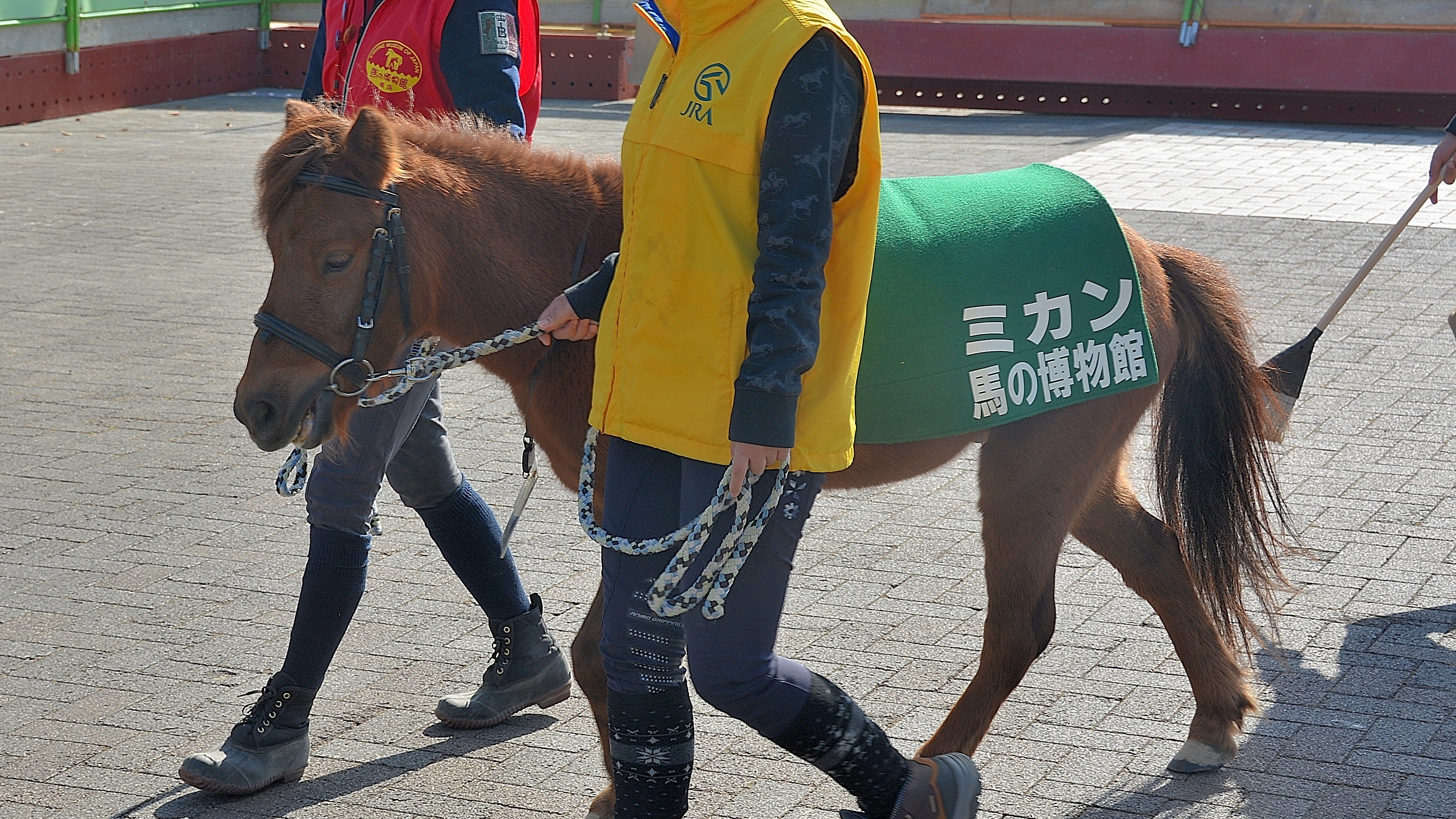
- Conservation status: FAO (2007): critically endangered; DAD-IS (2025): unknown
- Other names: Japanese: 野間馬; Noma-uma
- Country of origin: Japan
- Use: warfare; pack-horse; riding; tourism; hippotherapy

Traits
- Height: Male: 112 cm; Female: 110 cm

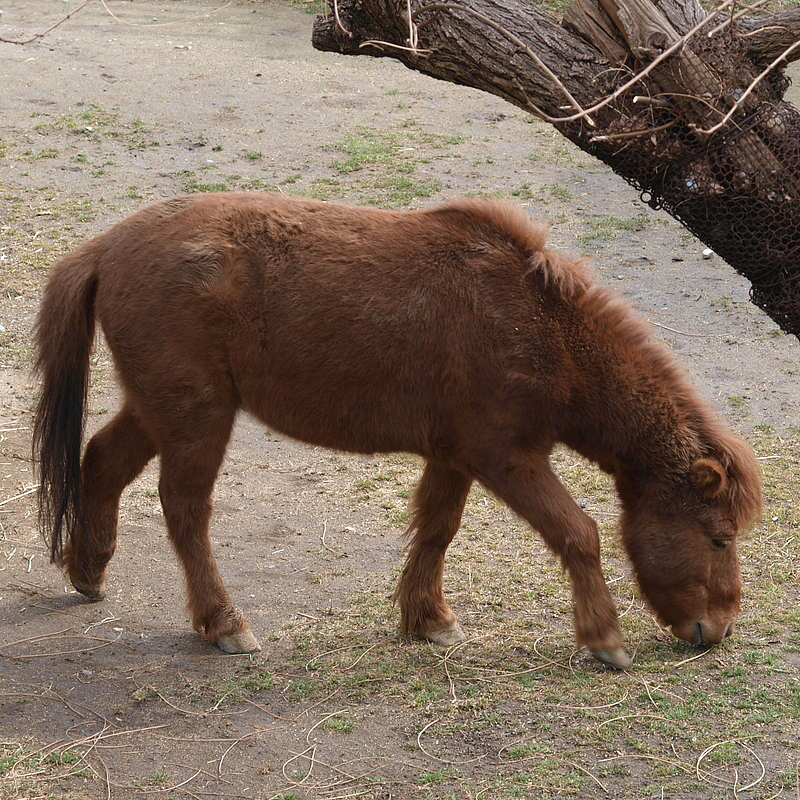
In Tennōji Zoo, Osaka

The Noma (野間馬, Noma-uma) is an endangered Japanese breed of small horse. It originates from the island of Shikoku, the smallest of the four principal islands of Japan, and is named for the former district of Noma, the northernmost part of the former province of Iyo, now Ehime Prefecture. It is the smallest of the eight native horse breeds of Japan.

== Characteristics ==
The Noma is a small, compact and sturdy horse, the smallest of the eight native horse breeds of Japan. It is hardy and strong, and agile on difficult mountain terrain.

== Breed history ==
Japanese horses are thought to derive from stock brought at several different times from various parts of the Asian mainland; the first such importations took place by the sixth century at the latest. Horses were used for farming – as pack-animals although not for draught power; until the advent of firearms in the later sixteenth century, they were much used for warfare. The horses were not large: remains of some 130 horses have been excavated from battlefields dating to the Kamakura period (1185–1333 AD); they ranged from 110 to 140 cm in height at the withers.

The Noma may originate from the small islands of the Seto Inland Sea between Shikoku and Honshū, where it may have been used for transport. According to one account, in the early sixteenth century the daimyō of the Iyo-Matsuyama Han of Shikoku wanted to breed horses for military use. Larger horses were kept for that purpose, while smaller ones were given to farmers, who found them useful as pack-animals on steep terrain. The Noma is thought to derive from these. There were not many of them; the total number in the mid-1800s is estimated at about three hundred.

After the Russo-Japanese War of 1904–1905, there was pressure to breed much larger horses for warfare. Large foreign horses were imported, and the rearing of the small traditional indigenous breeds was forbidden. Numbers of the Noma fell sharply. Some isolated farmers kept a few for farm work, but with the mechanisation of agriculture after the Second World War, their usefulness decreased further.

By 1978 there were six Noma horses remaining; two were in the Tobe Zoological Park in Tobe, and four were kept by a private breeder. A government-funded reserve, the Noma Uma Highland, was established in 1989 by the city of Imabari, in Ehime Prefecture of Shikoku; it started with thirty of the horses. By 2008 the number had risen to eighty-four.

A study of microsatellite variation among Japanese horse breeds in 2003 found the Noma to be closely related to three other Japanese small-island breeds, the Misaki, the Tokara, and Yonaguni.

== Use ==
The Noma was traditionally used as an agricultural pack-animal, and in warfare; it is now principally a tourist attraction. The Noma Uma Highland is visited by some 2000000 people per year. The horses are used for riding – often by children – and for horse therapy.

== See also ==
- List of Japanese horse breeds
