= Yaeko Mizutani =

Japanese actress (1905–1979)

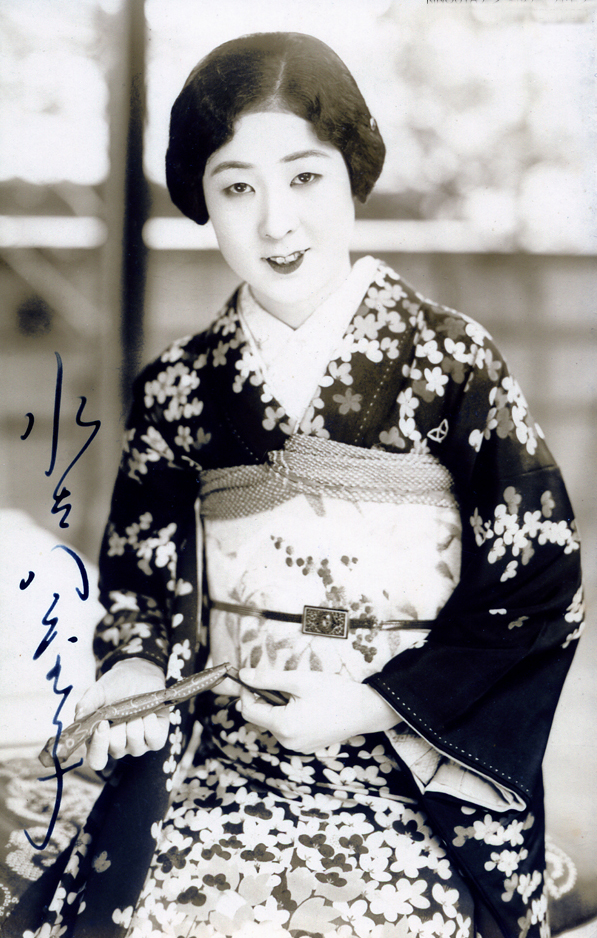
- Yaeko Mizutani in the 1920s, holding a toy snake
- Born: 1 August 1905; Tokyo, Japanese Empire
- Died: 1 October 1979 (aged 74); Tokyo, Japan
- Occupation: Actress

Yaeko Mizutani I (1 August 1905 – 1 October 1979) (水谷八重子 in Japanese, or しょだい みずたに やえこ in kana) was "grande dame of the Japanese stage" and in film from the 1920s through the 1970s. Mizutani's daughter is also an actress called Yaeko Mizutani, so the elder Mizutani is sometimes referred to with an "I" after her name.

== Early life ==
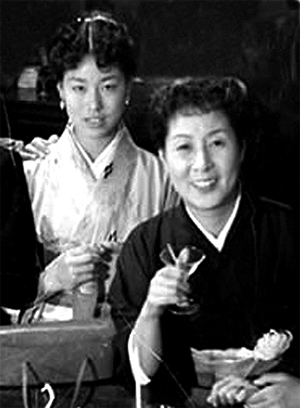
Yoshie and Yaeko Mizutani in 1955

Mizutani was born in Kagurazaka, Tokyo, daughter of Toyozo and Tome Matsuno. Her father was a watchmaker who died when Yaeko was a small child. She was raised in the household of her older sister and her brother-in-law, writer Mizutani Chikushi, whose family name she also used. She attended Futaba Girls' High School.

== Career ==
=== Theatre ===
Mizutani began acting in plays as a child. She formed an outdoor theatre company with Tomoda Kyosuke as a young woman, and she was active in several experimental and artistic theatre companies in the mid-1920s. There is an audio recording of her performing in 1929, in Shishi ni Kuwareru Onna (The Woman Eaten by a Lion). She formed a theatre company with Masao Inoue in the 1930s, and played Hamlet in 1937. After World War II, she was one of the pillars of shinpa (new school) theatre in Tokyo. She is credited as participating in the first on-stage kiss in Japanese theatre, in 1946.

=== Film and television ===
Mizutani also acted in Japanese films, beginning in Shochiku studio films in the 1920s. Her first film was the silent Kantsubaki (Winter Camellia, 1921) with Masao Inoue. Her second film was Otosan (1923), directed by Yasujirô Shimazu. She was dubbed "the Japanese Mary Pickford" on a visit to Hawaii in 1926. She appeared in Shimazu's first sound film, Joriku dai-ippo (First Steps Ashore, 1932). She played the tragic title role in two adaptations of Taii no musume (The Captain's Daughter), in 1929 and 1936.

In 1941 she starred in Hiroshi Shimizu's Utajo Oboegaki (Notes of an Itinerant Performer), playing an actress who becomes a tutor in a tea merchant's household. She often played mother characters in the 1950s, for example in Kojiro Sasaki's Haha (Mother, 1950) and Hahamachigusa (Motherhood, 1951), Kyoshi Saeki's Arashi no naka no haha (Mother in the Storm, 1952), and Seiji Maruyama's Haha to musume (1953). In her last screen performances, Mizutani was a regular cast member on the television program Hyôketsu (Missing, 1962–1966).

=== Honors ===
Mizutani's achievements in theatre were recognized with many awards in her later years. She was awarded the Kikuchi Kan Prize in 1957, and the Asahi Culture Prize in 1972. She was named a Person of Cultural Merit in 1971.

== Personal life ==
Mizutani's relationship with fellow actress Nara Miyako was considered a scandal in 1929; Nara was playing the Prince in a production of Cinderella at the time. She married Kanya Morita XIV in 1937. They had a daughter, Yoshishige (Yoshie), born in 1939; the daughter later used the name Yaeko Mizutani. Mizutani died from breast cancer in 1979, at the age of 74, in Tokyo. Journalist Takao Tokuoka commented that "She was invariably attractive, and at the same time expressive, as great actresses always are, of eternal womanhood."
