= Yonaguni horse =

Japanese breed of horse

Yonaguni
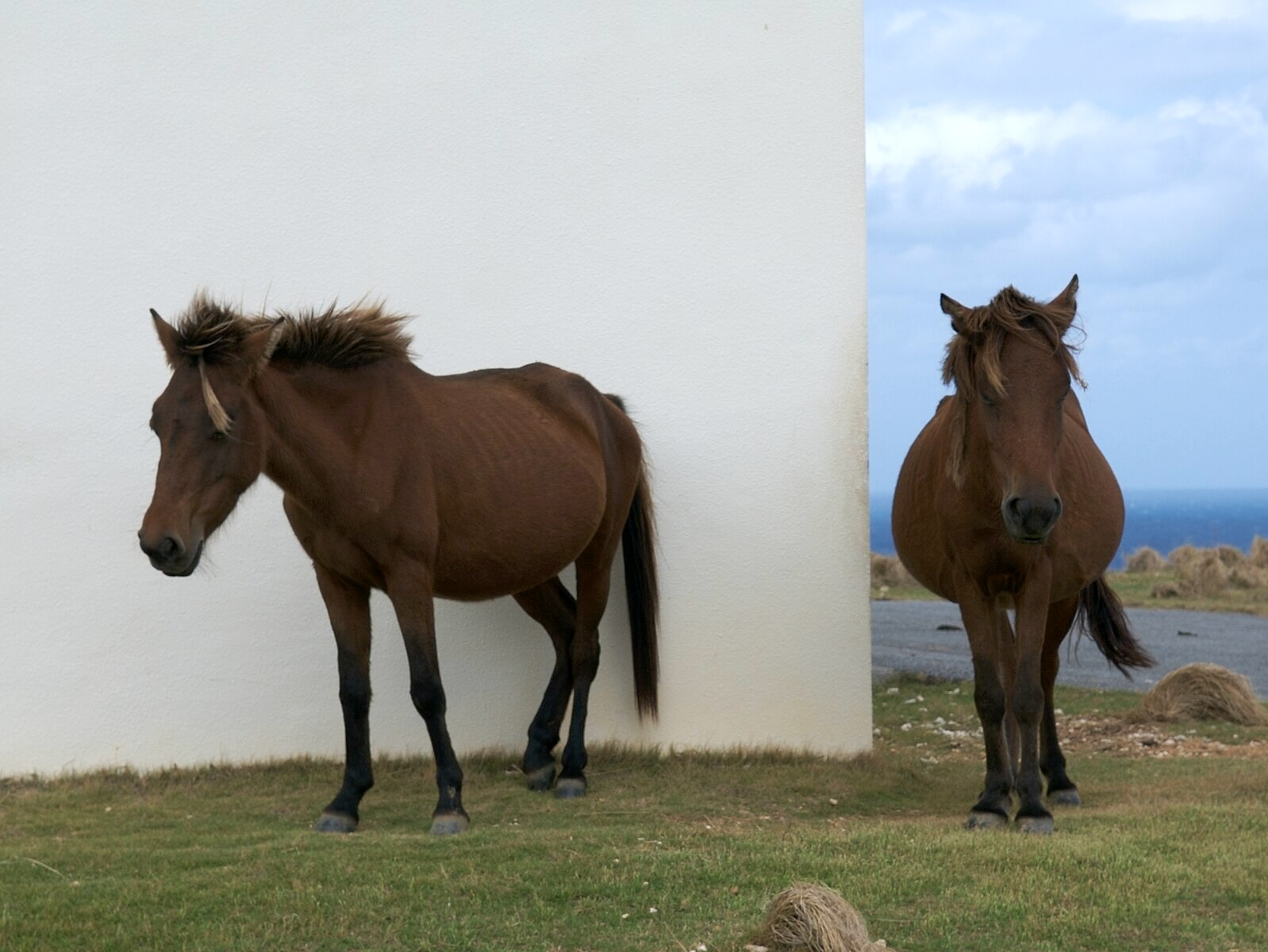

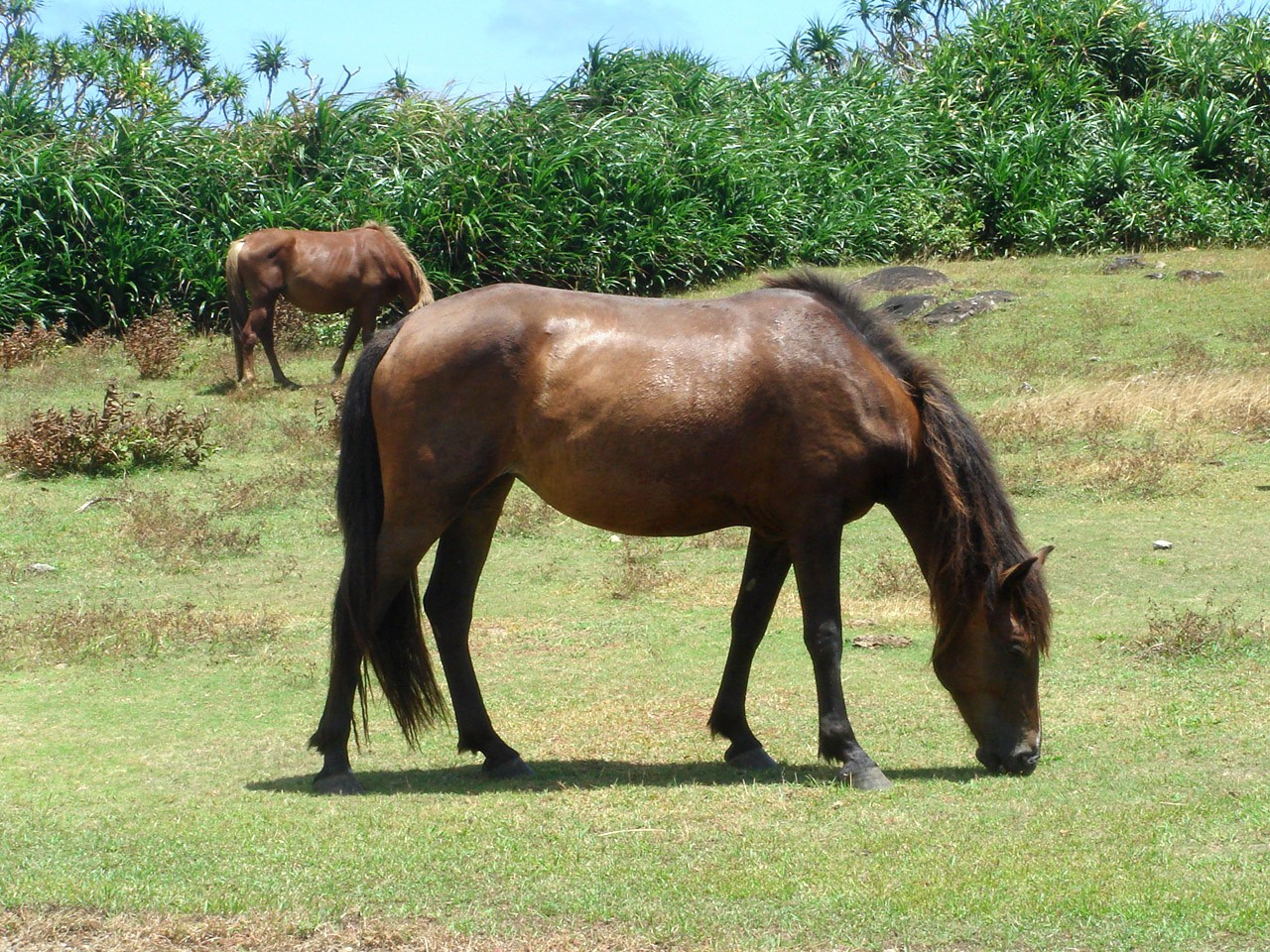
- Conservation status: FAO (2007): critical
- Country of origin: Japan
- Distribution: Yonaguni Island

Traits
- Height: 102–122 cm (10–12 h); Male: average 120 cm; Female: average 116 cm

The Yonaguni (Japanese: 与那国馬, yonaguni uma, Yonaguni: Chimanma) is an endangered Japanese breed of small horse. It is native to Yonaguni Island, in the Yaeyama Islands in south-western Japan, close to Taiwan. It is one of eight horse breeds native to Japan and – like most other Japanese native breeds – is critically endangered.

== History ==
Japanese native horses are thought to derive from stock brought at several different times from various parts of the Asian mainland; the first such importations took place by the sixth century at the latest. Horses were used for farming – as pack-animals although not for draught power; until the advent of firearms in the later sixteenth century, they were much used for warfare. The horses were not large: remains of some 130 horses have been excavated from battlefields dating to the Kamakura period (1185–1333 AD); they ranged from 110 to 140 cm in height at the withers.

In 1968 there were 210 Yonaguni horses. By the early 1980s, the number had fallen to little more than fifty; numbers subsequently recovered slightly. The conservation status of the breed was listed as "critical" by the Food and Agriculture Organization of the United Nations in 2007. No population data has been reported to DAD-IS since 2008, when the breed numbered 85 head, up from a low of 48 individuals recorded in 1977. In 2025 its conservation status was unknown.

In 2003, genetic analysis using microsatellite data found the Yonaguni to be most closely related to the Miyako and Tokara small-island breeds, and less closely related to various Mongolian horse breeds than were the Dosanko and Kiso breeds of the main islands of Japan.

== Characteristics ==
Like the other Japanese island breeds, the Yonaguni is small. Heights at the withers are in the range 102–122 cm.
