= Misaki horse =

Japanese breed of horse

Misaki
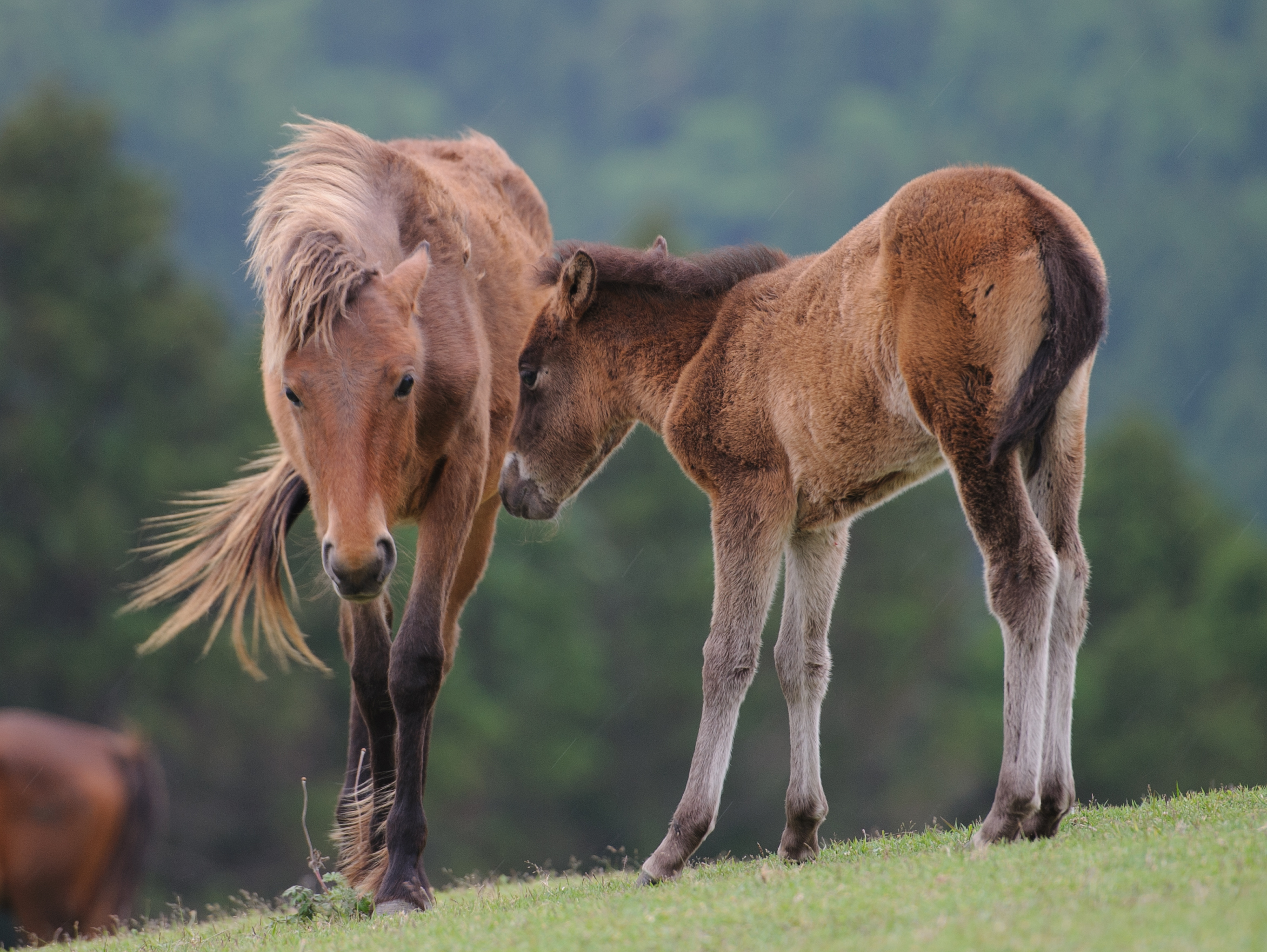

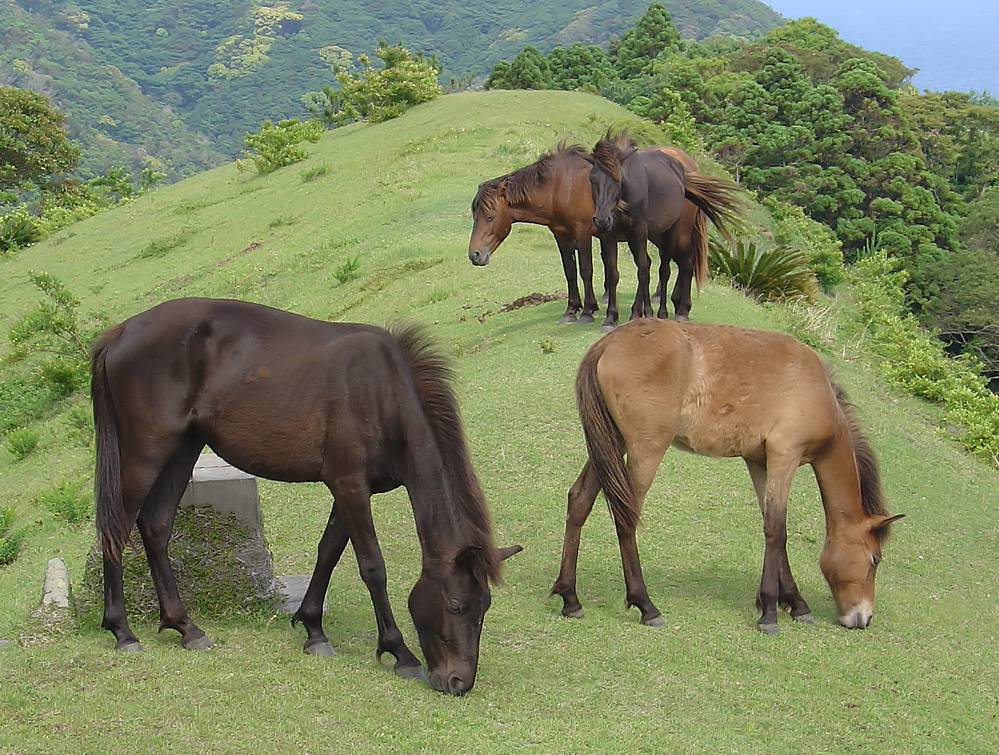
- Conservation status: FAO (2007): critically endangered
- Other names: Japanese: 御崎馬; Japanese: 岬馬; Misaki-uma
- Country of origin: Japan
- Distribution: Cape Toi, Miyazaki Prefecture

Traits
- Height: 130–135 cm
- Colour: dark colours

The Misaki (Japanese: 御崎馬 or 岬馬, Misaki uma) is an endangered Japanese breed of small horse. It is one of eight Japanese native horse breeds, and lives as a feral horse in a natural setting in a designated National Monument on Cape Toi (also known as Toimisaki) within the municipal boundaries of Kushima at the south end of Miyazaki Prefecture on the island of Kyūshū. The Misaki was made a Japanese National Natural Treasure in 1953.

== History ==
Japanese horses are thought to derive from stock brought at several different times from various parts of the Asian mainland; the first such importations took place by the sixth century at the latest. Horses were used for farming – as pack-animals although not for draught power; until the advent of firearms in the later sixteenth century, they were much used for warfare. The horses were not large: remains of some 130 horses have been excavated from battlefields dating to the Kamakura period (1185–1333 AD); they ranged from 110 to 140 cm in height at the withers.

The Misaki and the area in which it lives, Cape Toi, were declared a Natural Monument in 1953 (Shōwa 28)..

The Misaki was classified as "critical-maintained" by the Food and Agriculture Organization of the United Nations in 2007. No population data has been reported to DAD-IS since 2008, when the breed numbered approximately 120 head, up from a low of 53 individuals recorded in 1973. In 2025 its conservation status was unknown.

A genetic study of Japanese and Mongolian horse breeds in 2003 found the Misaki to be most closely related to the Noma, Tokara and Yonaguni breeds. In 2011, twelve horses of the Misaki herd gave positive Coggins test results for equine infectious anaemia. From the blood of one of them, the whole viral genome was sequenced. It was found to be substantially different from the two equine infectious anaemia strains that had previously been completely sequenced.

== Characteristics ==
The Misaki is a small dark-coloured horse, standing about 132 cm at the withers.
