= Miyako =

Miyako may refer to:

== Places in Japan ==
- Miyako, Iwate, a city in Iwate Prefecture
- Miyako Islands
  - Miyako Island
  - Miyakojima, Okinawa, a city of the Miyako Islands
- Miyako, Fukuoka, a town in Fukuoka Prefecture
- Miyako Strait, the strait between Miyako Islands and Okinawa Islands
- Miyako and Kyō no Miyako, former names of Kyoto

== Other use ==
- Miyako (given name)
- Miyako language, a Ryukyuan dialect spoken on Miyako Island and other nearby islands
- Miyako Pony, a breed of pony originating from Miyako island in Japan
- Japanese cruiser Miyako, an unprotected cruiser of the Imperial Japanese navy
