= Miyako (given name) =

- Gender: Female

Origin
- Origin: Japanese
- Meaning: Different meanings depending on the kanji used

Miyako (written: 都, 京, 宮子, 美也子, 美弥子 or みやこ in hiragana) is a feminine Japanese given name. Notable people with the name include:

- Miyako Endō (遠藤 みやこ; born 1965), Japanese voice actress
- Miyako Inoue (anthropologist) (born 1962), American anthropologist
- Miyako Ishiuchi (石内 都; born 1947), Japanese photographer
- Miyako Itō (伊東 みやこ; born 1969), Japanese voice actress
- Miyako Kawase (born 1951), Japanese luger
- Miyako Maki (牧 美也子; born 1935), Japanese manga artist
- Miyako Matsumoto (松本 都; born 1985), Japanese actress and professional wrestler
- Miyako Miyazaki (宮崎 京; born 1978), Japanese fashion model
- Miyako Morino (杜野 都; born 1989), alter ego of Japanese professional wrestler Misaki Ohata
- Miyako Nara (奈良 美也子; 1907–2000), Japanese singer, TV and musical actress
- Miyako Ōtsuka (大塚 宮子; born 1953), Japanese basketball player
- Miyako Tao (多緒 都; born 1968), Japanese voice actor
- Miyako Sumiyoshi (住吉 都; 1987–2018), Japanese speed skater
- Miyako Tanaka (田中 京; born 1967), Japanese synchronised swimmer
- Miyako Yamaguchi (山口 美也子; born 1952), Japanese actress
- Miyako Yamashita (山下 美弥子; born 1962), Japanese volleyball player
- Miyako Yoshida (吉田 都; born 1965), Japanese ballet dancer

== Fictional characters ==
- Miyako (宮子), a character in the manga series Hidamari Sketch
- Miyako Arima (有間 都古), a character in the video game Melty Blood
- Miyako Gotokuji (豪徳寺 みやこ), a character in the anime series Powerpuff Girls Z
- Miyako Inoue (井ノ上 京; Yolei Inoue in English dub), a character in the anime series Digimon Adventure 02
- Miyako Komagusu (駒玖珠 都), a character in the anime series Ghost Hound
- Miyako Miyamura (宮村 みやこ), a character in the visual novel ef - a tale of memories
- Miyako Shiina (椎名 京), a character in the visual novel Maji de Watashi ni Koi Shinasai!
- Miyako Shirakawa (白川 京), a character in the light novel series A Sister's All You Need
- Miyako Toudaiji (東大寺 都), a character in the manga series Kamikaze Kaito Jeanne
- Miyako Tsukiyuki (月雪 ミヤコ), a character in the role-playing game Blue Archive
- Miyako Kajiro, a character in the survival horror video game Forbidden Siren
- Miyako Saitō, a character in manga and anime series Oshi no ko

== See also ==
- Harumi Miyako (born 1948, surname Miyako, given name Harumi), enka singer
