= Murayama (surname) =

Murayama (written: 村山, lit. "village mountain") is a Japanese surname. Notable people with the surname include:

- Akihiro Murayama (born 1980), Japanese mixed martial artist
- Go Murayama (村山 豪; born 1998), Japanese volleyball player
- Kaita Murayama (1896–1919), Japanese author
- Milton Murayama (1923–2016), Japanese-Hawaiian novelist and playwright
- Noé Murayama (1930–1997), Mexican actor
- Shichirō Murayama (1908–1995), Japanese linguist
- Takashi Murayama (村山 隆志; born 1951), Japanese rower
- Takuya Murayama (村山 拓哉; born 1989), Japanese footballer
- Tamotsu Murayama (1905–1968), Director of the Boy Scouts of Japan
- Tatsuo Murayama (1915–2010), Japanese politician
- Tetsuya Murayama (村山 哲也; born 1974), Japanese football manager
- Murayama Tōan, Japanese magistrate in 17th-century
- Tomiichi Murayama (1924–2025), 81st Prime Minister of Japan
- Tomohiko Murayama (born 1987), Japanese footballer
- Tomoyoshi Murayama (1901–1977), Japanese avant-garde artist
- Úrsula Murayama (born 1972), Mexican actress
- Wataru Murayama, female Japanese manga writer
- Yasuaki Murayama (born 1984), Japanese shogi player
- Yoshitaka Murayama, creator of the video game series Suikoden
- Yusuke Murayama (born 1981), Japanese former football player
