= Murayama =

Murayama may refer to:

- Murayama (surname)
- Murayama, Yamagata, a city in Japan
