= Misawa =

Misawa (written: 三沢 or 三澤) may refer to:

== Surname ==
- Mitsuharu Misawa (1962–2009), Japanese professional wrestler
- Koichi Misawa (born 1974), Japanese baseball player
- Minoru Misawa (三沢 実, born 1949), Japanese ice hockey player
- Sachika Misawa, Japanese voice actress and singer
- Satoru Misawa (三沢 悟, born 1943), Japanese ice hockey player
- Shin Misawa, Japanese anime director and storyboard artist
- Teruo Misawa, Japanese boxer

=== Fictional characters ===
- Bastion Misawa (Daichi Misawa) in Yu-Gi-Oh! GX
- Maho Misawa in Ro-Kyu-Bu!

== Places ==
- Misawa, Aomori, a city located along the far North Pacific coastline of mainland Japan
- Misawa Station, a railway station of Misawa, Aomori
- Misawa Air Base, an American as well as a Japanese airbase
- Misawa Airport
