= Mido =

Mido may refer to:

- Mido (watch), a traditional Swiss watch brand owned by the Swatch Group
- Mido, one of the nicknames for males named Muhammad or Ahmad in the Arab World
- Midō, a Japanese family name
- Manufacturing Inspection District Offices, a body of the FAA

== People ==
- Mido (footballer), an Egyptian football player.
- El Mehdi Sidqy (born 1984), known as Mido, Moroccan footballer
- Jeon Mi-do, a South Korean actress

== Fictional characters ==
- Ban Mido from GetBackers.
- Shingo Mido from Death Note.
- Madoka Mido from Starship Girl Yamamoto Yohko.
- Miko Mido from La Blue Girl.
- Kusabi Mido from Rosario + Vampire.
- Mido, a fictional character from the video game The Legend of Zelda: Ocarina of Time
