= Momozono =

Momozono can refer to:

== People ==
- Emperor Momozono, (1741–1762), the 116th Emperor of Japan
- Emperor Go-Momozono, (1758–1779), the 118th emperor of Japan

== Places ==
- Momozono Station, a station of the Kintetsu Nagoya Line, located in Hisai, Mie prefecture

== Fictional characters ==
- Asahi Momozono, from the manga series Minamoto-kun Monogatari
- Betty Momozono, from the black-and-white film Nude Actress Murder Case: Five Criminals
- Love Momozono, from the anime series Fresh Pretty Cure!
- Makina Momozono, from the manga series Ultimate Otaku Teacher
- Mei Momozono, from the manga series Mouse (manga)
- Miki Momozono, from the tokusatsu television series Dai Sentai Goggle-V
- Momoka Momozono, from the manga series Super HxEros
- Momoko Momozono, from the anime series Godannar
- Nanami Momozono, from the manga series Kamisama Kiss
- Satomi Momozono, from the video game series Kunio-kun
- Tōichirō Momozono, from the manga series World Trigger
