= Miyazaki =

Miyazaki (Japanese: 宮崎) may refer to:

- Miyazaki Prefecture, Japanese prefecture
  - Miyazaki (city), capital city of the prefecture
- Miyazaki (surname), Japanese surname
  - Hayao Miyazaki, Japanese animator who cofounded Studio Ghibli
  - Hidetaka Miyazaki, Japanese game director, president of FromSoftware and creator of the Dark Souls series
- "Miyazaki", 2026 song by Paris Paloma
