= Tamotsu Murayama =

- Born: December 24, 1905. Seattle, Washington
- Died: December 31, 1968 (aged 63); On-board ship to Hong Kong
- Occupations: Journalist, lecturer at Waseda University, and Director of the Boy Scouts of Japan
- Known for: Contributed greatly to the revival of the Boy Scout movement in Japan after World War II

Tamotsu Murayama (村山 有, Murayama Tamotsu; December 24, 1905 Seattle, Washington - December 31, 1968) was a Japanese journalist, lecturer at Waseda University, and Director of the Boy Scouts of Japan. He also worked with Olave Baden-Powell and Peter Baden-Powell, and contributed greatly to the revival of the Boy Scout movement in Japan after World War II.

After the end of World War II, he gathered members who had been forbidden from meeting, and frequently held Scout gatherings, laying the foundation for the revival of the Boy Scouts of Japan. On January 3, 1948, under the occupation, when flying the flag of Japan was not yet allowed, he held a "Hinomaru March" by the Boy Scouts with the Hinomaru for the first time since before the war.

In 1949, the Tokyo Scout Council was reorganized and he assumed office as President (Renmei-chō). From 12 April to 20 June 1950, Murayama was an instructor during the first seminar on leadership held with Michiharu Mishima and staff of the Boy Scouts of America to train Japanese Scout leaders.

A postage stamp collector, he established the Tokyo Stamp Association, a philatelic society, and served as the first president. In addition, as the Chairman of the Japan Scouts on Stamps Society (NSOSS), Vice Chairman of the Scouts on Stamps Society International (SOSSI), he contributed to the issuance of Japanese commemorative stamps on the "All Japan Boy Scout Conference" (1949), and the "50th Anniversary of the Founding of Scouting" (1957).

On December 31, 1968, he died of myocardial infarction on board ship to Hong Kong to attend the World Scout Conference. A Scout funeral was held on January 12, 1969, in Tokyo Tsukiji Hongan-ji. Murayama posthumously received the Order of the Sacred Treasure 5th class, Gold and Silver Rays.
