= Misato, Saitama =

Misato, Saitama may refer to:

- Misato, Saitama (city), in Saitama Prefecture
- Misato, Saitama (town), in Kodama District, Saitama Prefecture
