= Taishū horse =

Japanese breed of horse

Taishū
- Conservation status: FAO (2007): critical-maintained; DAD-IS (2025): unknown
- Other names: Tsushima; Taishu
- Country of origin: Japan
- Distribution: Tsushima Island, Nagasaki Prefecture
- Use: draught; pack-horse; transport; riding horse

Traits
- Height: 123 cm – 127 cm

The Taishū (対州馬, taishū uma) or Tsushima (対馬馬, tsushima uma) is an endangered Japanese breed of small horse from Tsushima Island in the Korea Strait, in Nagasaki Prefecture of Japan. It may be used for draught work, as a pack-horse or for riding; it was useful in the past for transport between remote villages in the mountains of the island, but is no longer so used.

== History ==
The Taishū is a traditional breed of Tsushima Island in the Korea Strait, in Nagasaki Prefecture of Japan, which was formerly also known as Taishū. It was formerly numerous on the island, with approximately 4000 head counted in the 1920s. By 1965 this number had fallen to 1182 head; it fell further, to 287 head in 1975 and to 75 head in 1985. Registration of pedigrees of the horses was started in 1979 as part of a programme to preserve the breed from extinction.

In 1991 the conservation status of the breed was reported as "critical" at 89 head. In 2007 it was listed by the Food and Agriculture Organization of the United Nations as "critical-maintained". A population of 30 was reported in 2008, and no population data has been reported since then; in 2025 the conservation status of the breed was not known.

== Characteristics ==
The Taishū is small, with strong legs. Average height at the withers is variously reported to be 123 cm or 127 cm.

== Use ==
The horses may be used for draught work, as pack-horses or for riding. In the past, they were much used for transport on the narrow paths between remote villages in the mountains of the island but in the twenty-first century are little used in this way.
