= Migration in Japan =

This article focuses on internal migration as well as migration from and to Japan.

Between 6 million and 7 million people moved their residences each year during the 1980s. About 50 percent of these moves were within the same prefecture; the others were relocations from one prefecture to another. During Japan's economic development in the twentieth century, and especially during the 1950s and 1960s, migration was characterized by urbanization as people from rural areas in increasing numbers moved to the larger metropolitan areas in search of better jobs and education. Out-migration from rural prefectures continued in the late 1980s, but more slowly than in previous decades.

In the 1980s, government policy provided support for new urban development away from the large cities, particularly Tokyo, and assisted regional cities to attract young people to live and work there. Regional cities offered familiarity to those from nearby areas, lower costs of living, shorter commutes, and, in general, a more relaxed life-style then could be had in larger cities. Young people continued to move to large cities, however, to attend universities and find work, but some returned to regional cities (a pattern known as U-turn) or to their prefecture of origin (a pattern known as J-turn).

Government statistics show that in the 1980s significant numbers of people left the largest cities (Tokyo and Osaka). In 1988 more than 500,000 people left Tokyo, which experienced a net loss through migration of nearly 73,000 for the year. Osaka had a net loss of nearly 36,000 in the same year. However, the prefectures showing the highest net growth are located near the major urban centers, such as Saitama, Chiba, Ibaraki, and Kanagawa around Tokyo, and Hyōgo, Nara, and Shiga near Osaka and Kyoto. This pattern suggests a process of suburbanization, people moving away from the cities for affordable housing but still commuting there for work and recreation, rather than a true decentralization.

Japanese economic success has led to an increase in certain types of external migration. In 1990, about 11 million Japanese went abroad. More than 80 percent of these people traveled as tourists, especially visiting other parts of Asia and North America. However, about 663,100 Japanese were living abroad, approximately 75,000 of whom had permanent foreign residency, more than six times the number who had that status in 1975. More than 200,000 Japanese went abroad in 1990 for extended periods of study, research, or business assignments. As the government and private corporations have stressed internationalization, greater numbers of individuals have been directly affected, decreasing Japan's historically claimed insularity. Despite the benefits of experiencing life abroad, individuals who have lived outside Japan for extended periods often faced problems of discrimination upon their return because others might no longer consider them fully Japanese. By the late 1980s, these problems, particularly the bullying of returnee children in the schools, had become a major public issue both in Japan and in Japanese communities abroad.

Ethnic issues in Japan and the situation of foreigners (Gaikokujin in Japanese) and Korean residents in Japan in particular are described in the articles this sentence links to.
