= Mikado =

Mikado may refer to:

- Emperor of Japan, formerly imprecisely rendered as Mikado

== Arts and entertainment ==
- The Mikado, an 1885 comic opera by Gilbert and Sullivan
- The Mikado (1939 film), an adaptation of the opera, directed by Victor Schertzinger
- The Mikado (1967 film), an adaptation of the opera, directed by Stuart Burge
- "The Mikado" (Millennium), a 1998 television episode
- Mikado (game), a pick-up sticks game
- "Mikado" (song), by Simone Drexel, the Swiss entry in the Eurovision Song Contest 1975
- Mikado (comics), a DC Comics character

== Biology ==
- Mikado pheasant (Syrmaticus mikado)
- Mikado, a genus of beetles in family Ptiliidae
- 'Mikado', a cultivar of Syngonanthus chrysanthus
- Forficula mikado, a species of earwig in the family Forficulidae
- Kempina mikado, a species of mantis shrimp in the family Squillidae
- Bolinopsis mikado, a species of Bolinopsis, a genus of ctenophores

== Food ==
- Mikado biscuits, a European marketing name for Pocky
- Jacob's Mikado biscuits, jam and mallow-topped, and sold in Ireland
- Mikado cake, Armenian layered cake
- Mikado chocolate, Croatian chocolate with rice invented by Zvečevo

== People ==
- Mikado (born 1949), nickname of Michel Warschawski, Israeli anti-Zionist activist
- Mikita Mikado (born 1986) IT entrepreneur
- Yuta Mikado (born 1986) Japanese footballer

== Places ==
- Mikado Glacier, a glacier in Alexander Island, Antarctica
- Mikado, Saskatchewan, a hamlet in Canada served by the Winnipeg–Churchill train
- Mikado Station, a railway station in Isumi, Chiba Prefecture, Japan
- Mikado Township, Michigan, a civil township in the U.S.
  - Mikado, Michigan, an unincorporated community

== Other uses ==
- Mikado (locomotive), any steam locomotive using the 2-8-2 wheel arrangement.
- USRA Light Mikado, a specific model of steam locomotive with that arrangement
- Mikado yellow, a color
- Operation Mikado, a military plan by the United Kingdom in the Falklands War
- 2-8-2, a steam locomotive wheel arrangement, often referred to as a Mikado

== Fictional characters ==
- Shiina "Misha" Mikado, a character in the visual novel Katawa Shoujo
- Mikado Sanzenin, a character in Ranma ½
- Mikado Ryūgamine, a character in Durarara!!

== See also ==
- MICADO
