= Toshiyuki Maesaka =

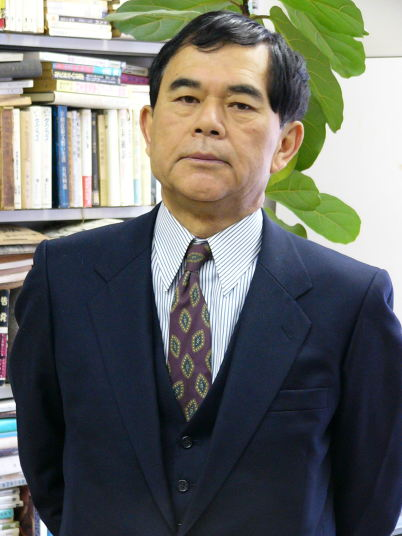
- Born: Okayama, Japan
- Occupations: Journalist, writer
- Website: maesaka-toshiyuki.com

Toshiyuki Maesaka (前坂 俊之, Maesaka Toshiyuki) is a Japanese freelance journalist, a former senior researcher of Mainichi Shimbun Newspaper, and a professor emeritus at the University of Shizuoka.

== Biography ==
Born and raised in Okayama prefecture, during his childhood he spent many hours at a secondhand bookstore near his home. The experience of reading the many books there whet his appetite for learning and influenced his decision to become a journalist educator and writer. He attended Keio University and majored in economics and, upon graduating, worked for Kure Mainichi Shinbun (Newspaper) in 1973. In July 1981, he was promoted to senior researcher at Mainichi Shimbun (Newspaper) headquarters. In April 1993, he became a professor at University of Shizuoka and taught journalism, media and international communications. He retired in 2009 and is currently a freelance journalist and enjoys sea canoeing and fishing.

== Books ==
- Nippon Shikei Hakusyo (日本死刑白書, Japanese Death Penalty White Paper): 1982 (ISBN 978-4-380-90217-8)
- Ennzai To Gohan (冤罪と誤判, A criminal accusation and Wrong Judgement): 1982
- Ayamatta Shikei (誤った死刑, the wrong death penalty): 1984 (ISBN 978-4-380-84221-4)
- Shinbun Kisya (新聞記者, News Paper Reporter): 1984 (ISBN 978-4-7889-2210-5)
- Nihon Hanzai Zukan (日本犯罪図鑑, Japanese Crimes): 1985
- Kijin Henjin Futujin(奇人・変人・フツー人): 1986
- Hei Ha Kyouki nari, Sensou to Shinbun『兵は凶器なり・戦争と新聞』(Solder is a Weapon / War and News Paper): 1986 (ISBN 978-4-390-60315-7)
- Syouwa Cyoujin Kijin Katarogu(昭和超人奇人カタログ): 1990
- Sakusesu Meigen Meikunsyu (サクセス名言明訓集): 1990
- Shikei(死刑, Death Penalty): 1991
- Genron Shi Shite Kuni Tuini Horobu, Sensou to Shinbun(言論死して国ついに亡ぶ・戦争と新聞): 1993 (ISBN 978-4-390-60316-4)
- Bijinesu Meigen Kai(ビジネス名言海): 1994
- Media No Sensou Sekinin(メディアの戦争責任: 1995
- Nippon Kijin Den(ニッポン奇人伝): 1996 (ISBN 978-4-390-11582-7)
- Media Kontororu, Nihon No Sensou Houdo(メディアコントロールー日本の戦争報道, Media Control – Japanese War Report): 2005 (ISBN 978-4-8451-0944-9)
- Nippon Ijin Kikou Roku (ニッポン偉人奇行録): 2006 (ISBN 978-4-8211-5054-0)
- "Syasetu" Senryou To Tandokukouwa(「写説」占領と単独講和):2006 (ISBN 978-4-8284-1299-3)
- Taiheiyou Sensou To Shinbun (太平洋戦争と新聞, The Pacific War and News Paper): 2007 (ISBN 978-4-06-159817-1)
- Hyakujusya Hyakugo(百寿者百語): 2008 (ISBN 978-4-7593-1027-6)
