= Izumi Muto =

Izumi Muto (武藤 泉, Mutō Izumi) born April 1963 in Gunma Prefecture, Japan, is a professor of Tohoku University and researcher of stainless steel. He is the author of some 200 patents concerning a metallic material and anti-corrosive technology, that have various characteristics including various types of stainless steel. Hideo Muto, who was chair of the Gunma University department of education, is his uncle.

== Career ==
- Takasaki high school graduation in 1982.
- Tohoku University engineering department graduation in 1986.
- Tohoku University graduate school engineering postgraduate course (metallurgical engineering specialty) Master's course finish in 1988.
- Nippon Steel entrance in 1988.
- He belonged to steel research center, technical research part (since 1994, head boffin).
- Tohoku University graduate school engineering postgraduate course (metallurgical engineering specialty) Doctoral course finish in 1998.
- He assumed Tohoku University graduate school engineering postgraduate course practical professor in 2005.
- He assumed Tohoku University graduate school engineering postgraduate course professor in 2014.

== Awards ==
- Progressive prize in 1997 from Japan Society of Corrosion Engineering.
- Technical development prize in 2004 from The Japan Institute of Metals and Materials.
- Commemoration prize of science (Nishiyama commemoration prize) in 2014 from The Iron and Steel Institute of Japan by "study of localized corrosion of steel material".
