= Mentai Waido =

Japanese television program based in Fukuoka

Mentai Waido is the name of a long-running local-interest television program shown on FBS (Fukuoka Broadcasting Corporation) in Fukuoka, Japan. The show is broadcast weekdays, from about 3pm until about 7pm, and consists of interviews with local people, introductions of local restaurants and attractions, and topical news segments. The programme has a light-hearted approach.

It was created in 1995, based on Sapporo TV's Dosanko Wide and was created as a replacement to FBS Evening News, initially running from 4:55pm to 7pm. Beginning in 1998, it became the most watched local program in its timeslot.

There was a sister program, Mentai Wide Special Edition, which ran from 2011 to 2016. It was reported to air on Kayo Pops TV in 2014 as part of the Interlocal Hour block.
