= Muko =

Muko may refer to:

- Mukō, Kyoto, Japan
- The Mukogawa River
- Muko Jima, Bonin Islands, Japan
- Muko Station, a railway station on the Hakubi Line in Kōfu, Tottori Prefecture, Japan
- Muko, Rwanda in Gikongoro District, Rwanda
- Muko, Uganda in Kabale District, Uganda
