= Miyako Nara =

Japanese actor (1907–2000)

Miyako Nara (1907 – 13 December 2000) (奈良美也子 in Japanese, or なら みやこ in kana) was a Japanese singer, TV and musical actress most widely recognized as Takarazuka Revue Flower Troupe's otokoyaku (男役 Takarazuka actresses who play male roles) top star from 1931 to 1936. She was from Kanazawa City, Ishikawa Prefecture. Her stage name comes from Ogura Hyakunin Isshu.

== Early life ==
In 1919, after graduating from Tennoji Daiichi Elementary School (now Osaka Municipal Tennoji Elementary School), Miyako entered Takarazuka Music and Opera School (now Takarazuka Music School) as a member of the ninth generation of the Takarazuka Revue Company and joined the Takarazuka Girls' Revue Company (now Takarazuka Revue Company). At that time, the school and the theater company were not separated, and "entrance = joining the company". Her real name was Tetsuko Wada (和田 鐵子 Wada Tetsuko), and she also used the pseudonyms Rokuya Hanayagi (花柳禄也 Hanayagi Rokuya). At the time of Hanayagi's pseudonym, her real surname was changed to Kanai (金井).

== Career ==
In March 1920, Miyako took the stage in the 25th performance of Dokunohanazono (Poison Garden). In February 1922, Miyako appeared as Hainritsuhi (Heinrich) in the fairy tale opera mahō no ningyō (Magic Doll). In November of the same year, Miyako appeared in the opera "Kamadohime" as the male role of the potter.

In April 1923, Miyako appeared as Ōkuninushi children's drama called "Sukunabikona". Also in the same month, Miyako appeared as Jacob in the opera "Death of Amina". In 1931, Miyako became the leader of the Hanagumi. In 1936, Miyako retired from the head of the Hanagumi.

In 1939, she left the Takarazuka Girls' Revue Company.

== Death ==
Miyako died on December 13, 2000, at 93 years old.

== Recognition ==
In 2014, Miyako was inducted into the Hall of Fame as one of the first 100 members of the Takarazuka Revue Hall, which was established to commemorate the 100th anniversary of the Takarazuka Revue.
