= Kiso Horse =

Japanese breed of horse

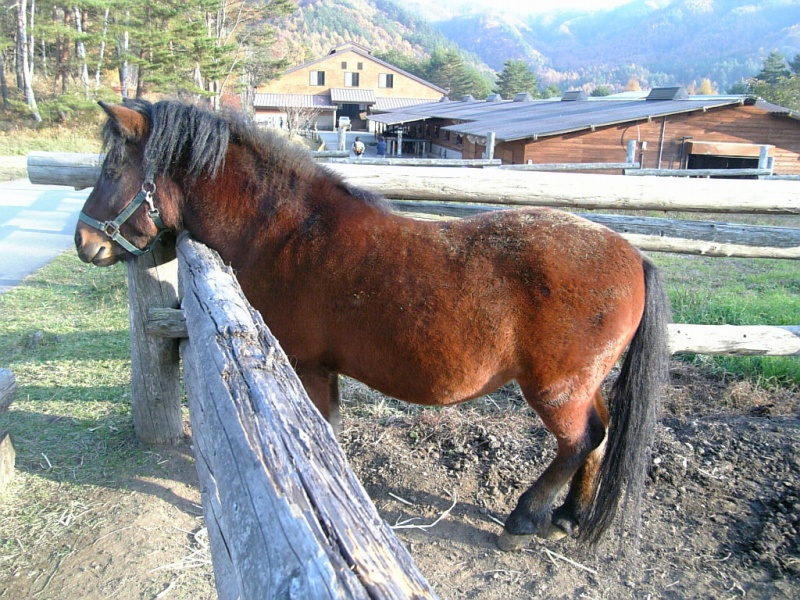

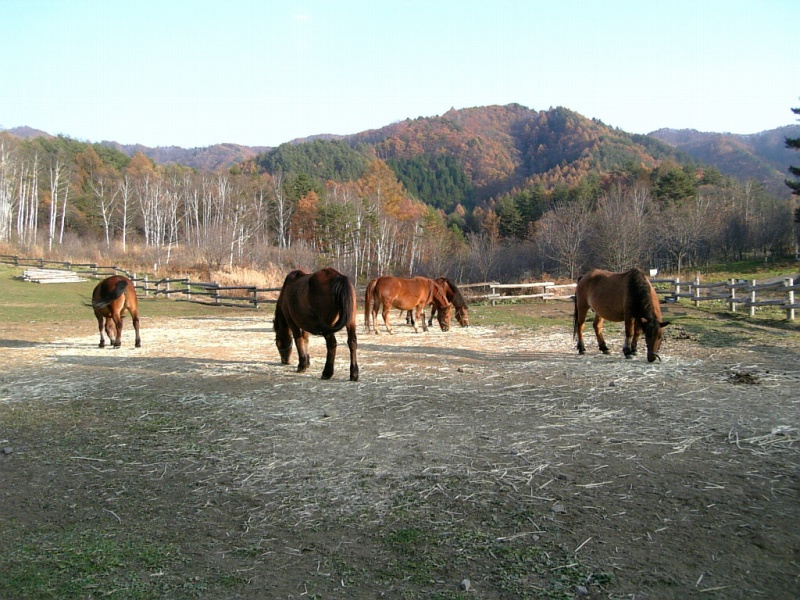
- Near the town of Kiso
- Conservation status: FAO (2007): critical; DAD-IS (2022): unknown
- Other names: Japanese: 木曽馬, kiso uma; Kiso; Kiso Pony
- Country of origin: Japan

Traits
- Weight: Male: 450 kg; Female: 300 kg
- Height: Male: 134 cm; Female: 132 cm

The Kiso or Kiso Horse (Japanese: 木曽馬, kiso uma) is one of the eight indigenous horse breeds of Japan. It is the only native horse breed from Honshu, the principal island of Japan. Like most other Japanese native breeds, it is critically endangered.

== History ==
Japanese native horses are thought to derive from stock brought at several different times from various parts of the Asian mainland; the first such importations took place by the sixth century at the latest. Horses were used for farming – as pack-animals although not for draught power; until the advent of firearms in the later sixteenth century, they were much used for warfare. The horses were not large: remains of some 130 horses have been excavated from battlefields dating to the Kamakura period (1185–1333 AD); they ranged from 110 to 140 cm in height at the withers.

The Kiso breed originates from the Kiso Valley and the Kiso Sanmyaku mountain range, in Nagano Prefecture, and the Higashimino region of Gifu Prefecture, in central Honshu. During the Meiji era (1868–1912) it was severely affected by the breeding programme of the Imperial Japanese Army, which wanted taller horses and ordered that all stallions of the breed should be gelded, and that only imported stallions be used to cover Kiso mares. After the Second World War few pure-bred Kiso horses remained. A single stallion, dedicated to a religious shrine, had escaped castration. His son Daisan-Haruyama was foaled in 1951 and is the foundation stallion of the present-day breed.

In 1899 there were 6823 of the horses. Between 1965 and 1976 breed numbers fell from 510 to 32. Registration of the breed began in that year, under the Kiso Pony Conservation Group, which was formed in 1969, and numbers have since slowly recovered. In 2013 the total population was estimated at 150. As a result of this population bottleneck, the effective population size – which has been calculated to be 45.8 – is much lower than the census population.

Four distinct sub-populations within the Kiso breed were identified in 2012.

The Kiso Uma no Sato ('Kiso horse village') at Kaita Kogen, below Mount Kiso Ontake, is a centre for the breeding and conservation of the Kiso breed.

== Characteristics ==
The Kiso is a small horse, but mid-sized in relation to other Japanese native breeds. Research published in 2011 found an average height of 131.9±4.4 cm, an average thoracic circumference (girth) of 167.1±10.1 cm and a cannon bone circumference of 18.3±1.0 cm. There was little sexual dimorphism: while males were marginally larger than mares, the difference was not significant. The size of the breed has decreased since 1948; this may be due either to in-breeding or to lessening influence of the foreign stallions used before the War.

The distribution of coat colours in Kiso horses has changed substantially since 1953: in 2011, approximately 93% of those studied were bay or dark bay, and the remainder either chestnut or buckskin dun; in 1953, bay and dark bay made up less than 60%, and there were also small numbers of black, grey and palomino horses. All registered stallions in 2011 were bay. About 66% of the horses studied had a dorsal stripe.
