= Dosanko =

Japanese breed of horse

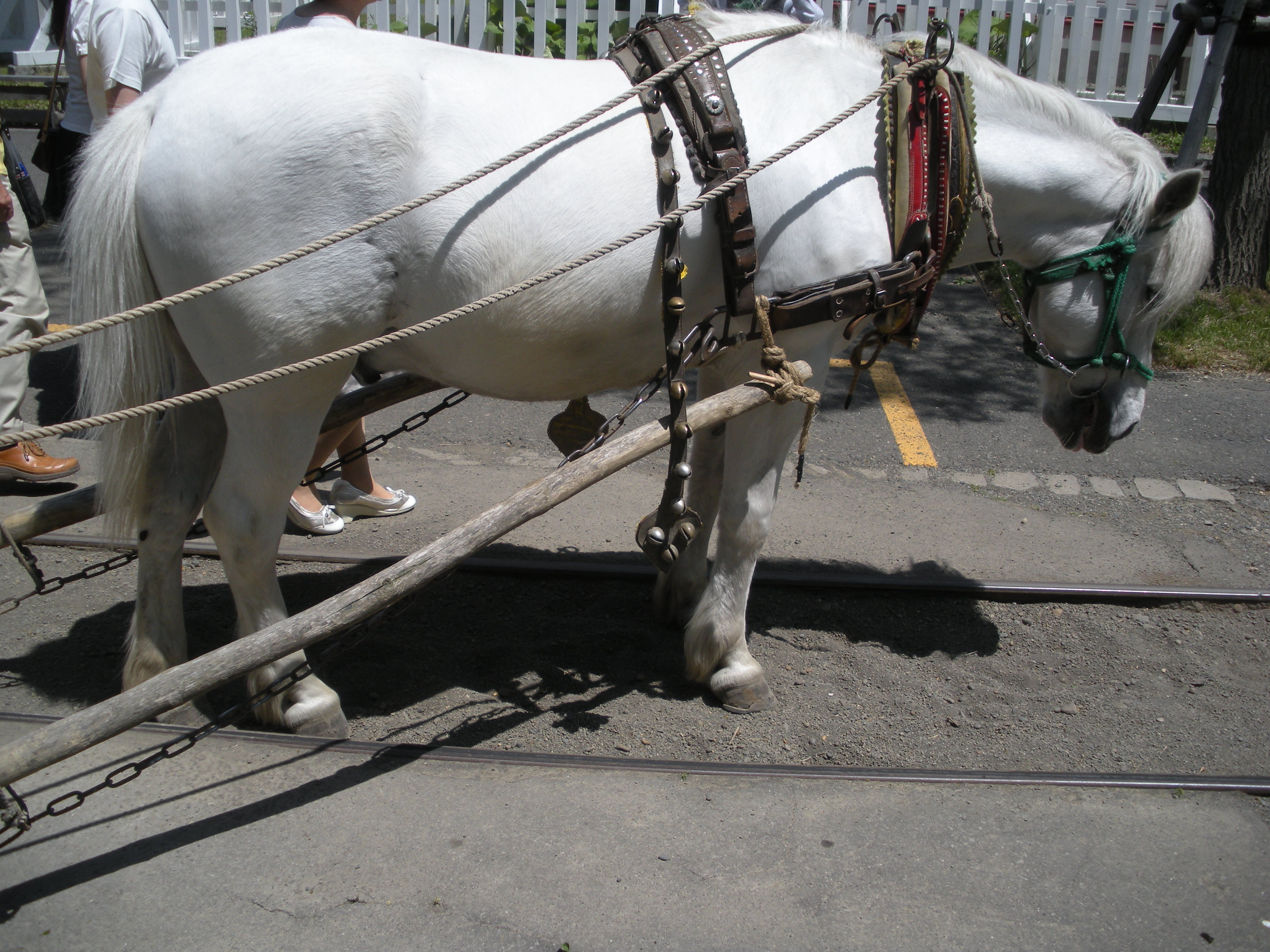
- Conservation status: FAO (2007): not at risk
- Other names: Hokkaido Horse; Hokkaido Pony

Traits
- Height: average 132 cm

The Dosanko (道産子) (Note: Also known as the Hokkaido Horse (北海道馬, Hokkaido uma) or Hokkaido Pony (北海道ポニー, Hokkaido ponii)) is a Japanese breed of small horse. It is one of eight extant indigenous horse breeds of Japan, and the only one of them not critically endangered. It originated on the island of Hokkaido, in the far north of the country, and is found particularly along the Pacific (eastern) coast of the island. The people of Hokkaido may be nicknamed "Dosanko" after the horses.

== History ==
Japanese horses are thought to derive from stock brought at several different times from various parts of the Asian mainland; the first such importations took place by the sixth century at the latest. Horses were used for farming – as pack-animals although not for draught power; until the advent of firearms in the later sixteenth century, they were much used for warfare. The horses were not large: remains of some 130 horses have been excavated from battlefields dating to the Kamakura period (1185–1333 AD); they ranged from 110 to 140 cm in height at the withers.

The Dosanko is thought to derive from horses brought to the island from the Tōhoku region of north-eastern Honshu in the late Tokugawa period (1603–1868), and abandoned there.

Total numbers of the breed grew from 1180 in 1973 to almost 3000 head in the early 1990s, but by the year 2000 had fallen to 1950 horses. A herd-book was established in 1979. Hokkaido University receives a grant to study conservation measures for the breed.

The conservation status of the Dosanko was listed by the Food and Agriculture Organization of the United Nations as "not at risk" in 2007. Population data has not been reported to DAD-IS since 2008, when there were 1254 horses, and in 2025 the conservation status of the breed was not known.
