= Miyako horse =

Japanese breed of horse

Miyako
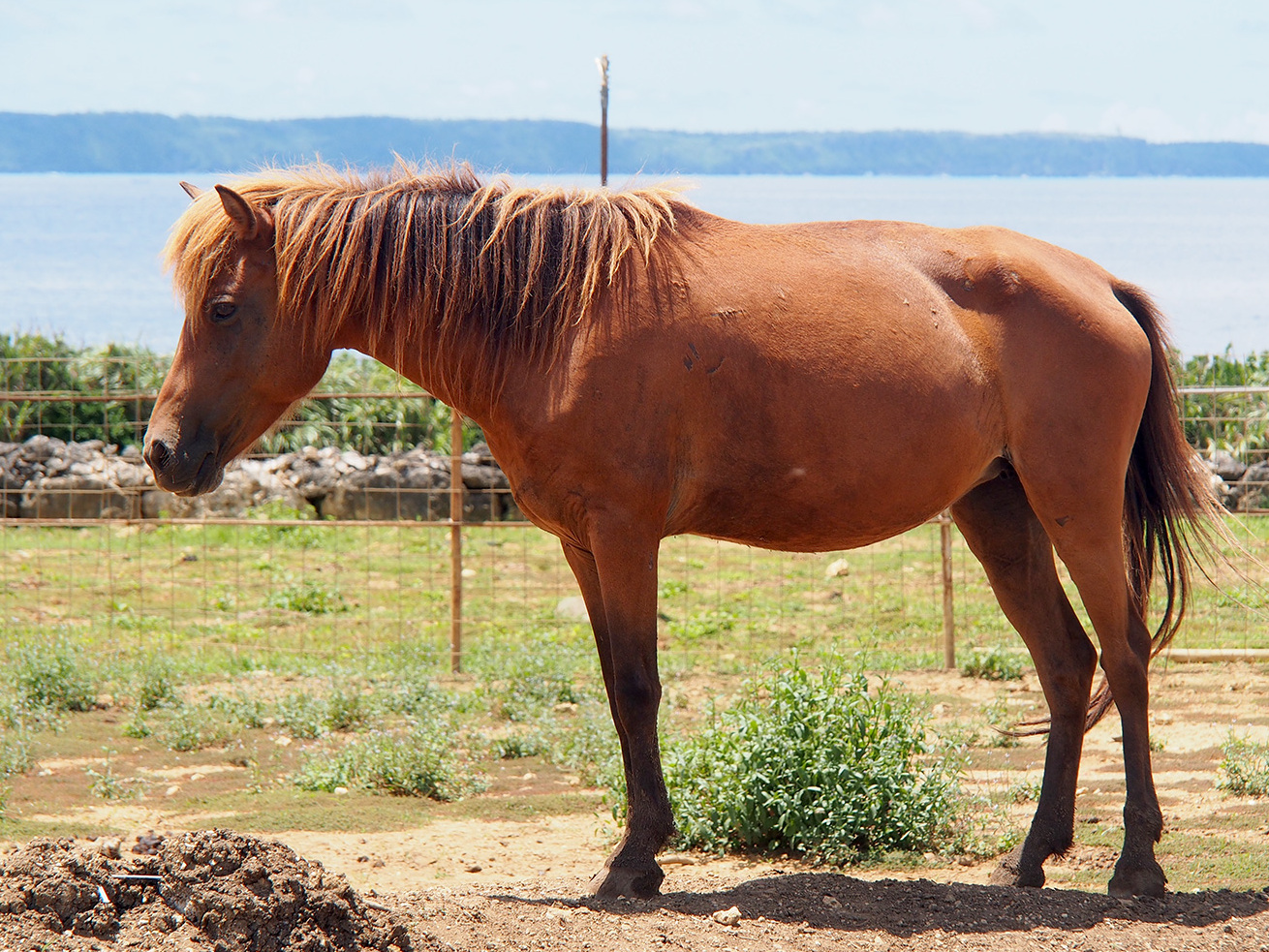

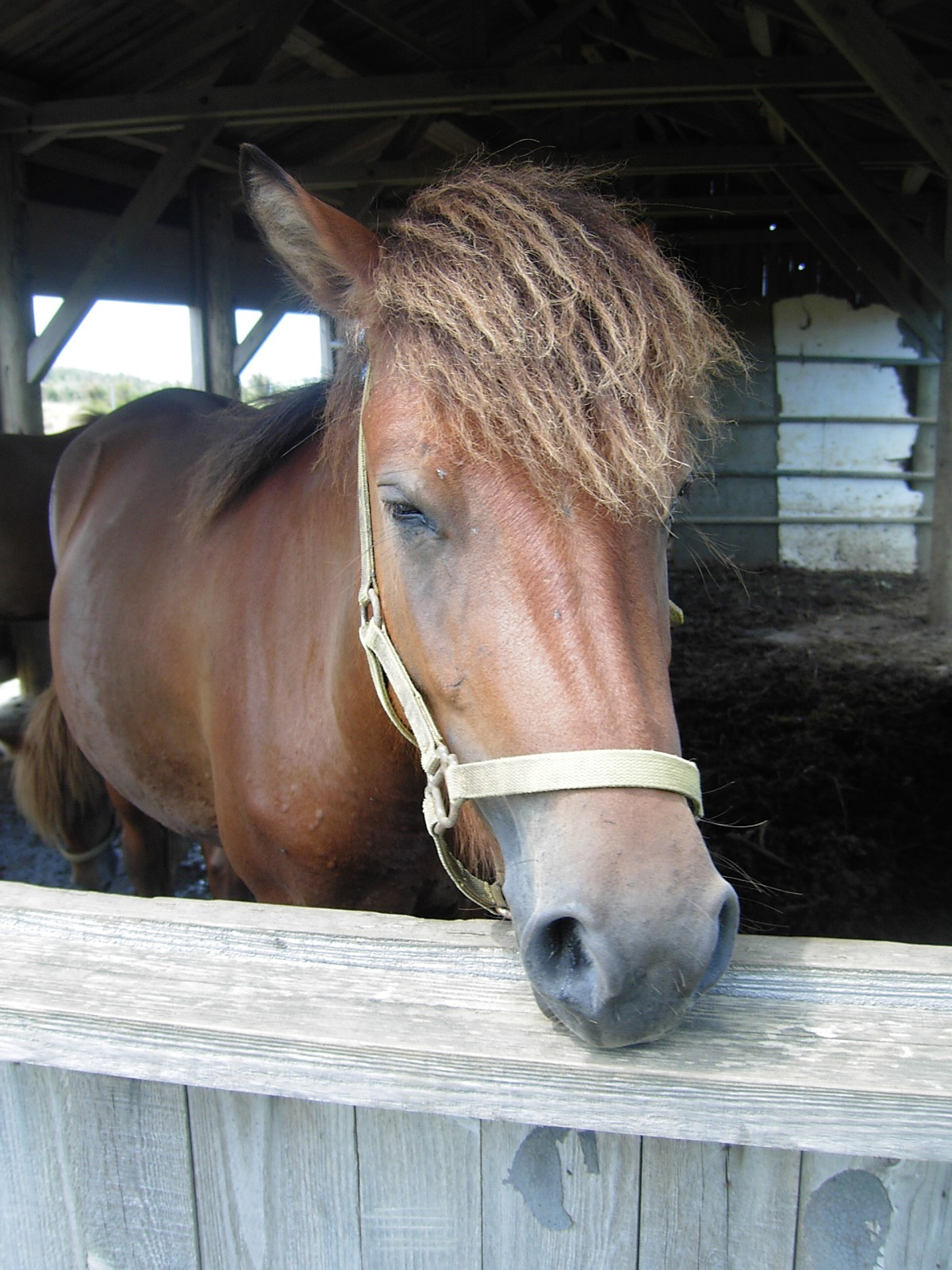
- Conservation status: FAO (2007): critical; DAD-IS (2026): unknown
- Country of origin: Japan
- Distribution: Okinawa Prefecture

Traits
- Height: Male: 122 cm; Female: 120 cm

The Miyako (Japanese: 宮古馬, Miyako uma) is a Japanese breed of small horse originating on Miyako Island, in the Ryukyu Islands in the southern part of Okinawa Prefecture, in south-western Japan. In the twenty-first century it is an endangered breed: total numbers have not been recorded at over forty head since records began in 1977.

== History ==
The Miyako is a traditional breed of Miyako Island, in the Ryukyu Islands in the southern part of Okinawa Prefecture, in south-western Japan. It was formerly a small horse, with a height at the withers of some 120–122 cm. In the mid-twentieth century it was cross-bred with larger horses of foreign origin, leading to in increase in height to about 142 cm.
