= Tokara horse =

Breed of horse

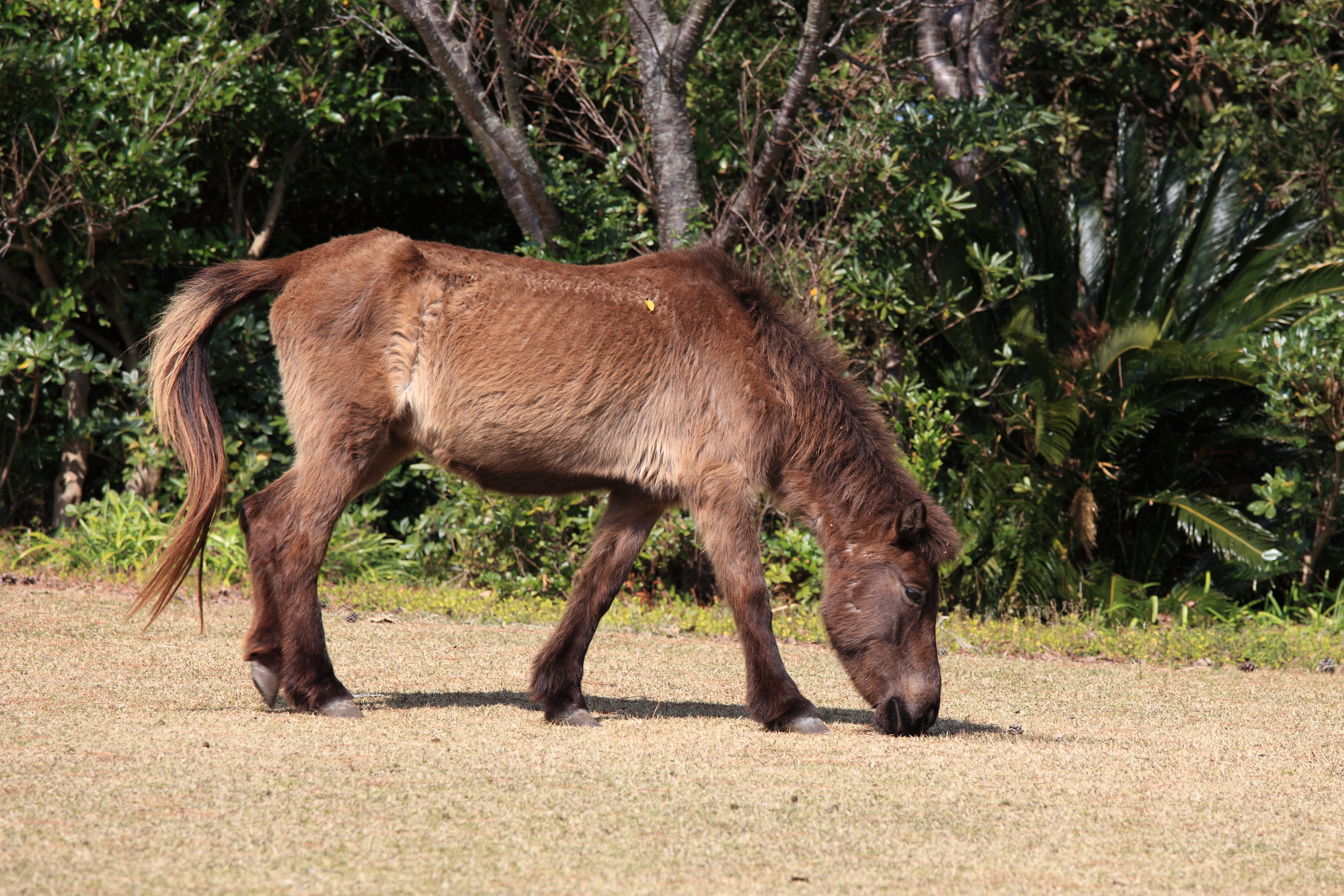
In Ibusuki, Kagoshima

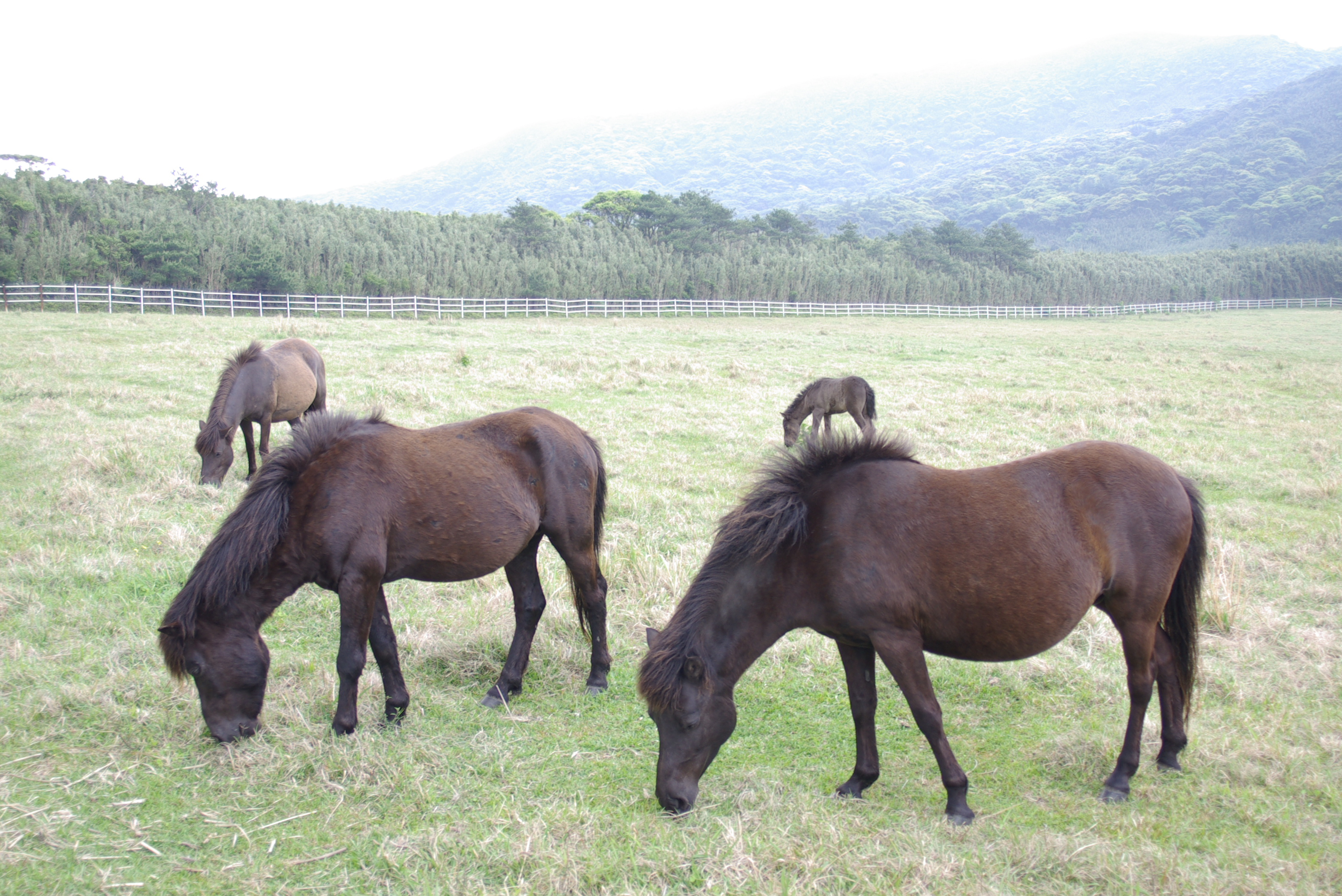
Tokara horses grazing in a pasture

The Tokara (吐噶喇馬, Tokara-uma) (also known as the Kagoshima horse) is a Japanese horse native to the Tokara Islands, a group of islands in Kagoshima Prefecture at the southwestern tip of the island of Kyushu. It is one of the eight indigenous horse breeds of Japan. Its height is about 100 to 120 centimetres (10 to 12 hands). Its coat color is predominantly seal brown. The Tokara has a good tolerance for heat and is used for agriculture, riding and sugar cane processing.

== History ==
In 1952 the horses were discovered on Takarajima by Shigeyuki Hayashida, a professor of Kagoshima University, and designated the Tokara horse. It was theorized that the horses were brought to Takarajima from Kikaijima around 1900. In 1953, the Tokara horse was designated a natural monument of Kagoshima Prefecture. When Professor Hayashida first discovered the horses, he counted 43. Their numbers gradually declined during the 1960s because of agricultural mechanization, however, and it was difficult to monitor the population on Takarajima. Therefore, some of the horses were transferred to the Mt. Kaimon Natural Park and Iriki Farm, part of the agricultural department of Kagoshima University.

== Endangered population ==
By 1974, there was only a single Tokara horse remaining on the Tokara Islands. This horse was transferred to Nakanoshima on the Tokaras, and was bred with Tokara horses which were reintroduced from the mainland. Currently, about ten Tokara horses are kept at Nakanoshima. A breeding farm is located at Takao, at the center of one of the islands. The horse population at Nakanoshima and on the mainland is increasing, and there is currently a total of 107 Tokara horses. Tokara-Penn’s three mares are on display at the Hirakawa Zoo in Kagoshima. Due to its small stature, the Tokara horse is no longer in demand as a plow horse on the Tokaras or the mainland and has limited utility as a riding horse; therefore, finding a practical use for the Tokara horse is a problem which will affect its future protection.
