= List of Natural Monuments of Japan (Tokyo) =

This list is of the Natural Monuments of Japan within the Metropolis of Tōkyō.

== National Natural Monuments ==
As of 1 April 2021, forty-five Natural Monuments have been designated, including six *Special Natural Monuments.

Monument	Municipality	Comments	Image	Coordinates	Type	Ref.
*Japanese serow Capricornis crispus カモシカ; Kamoshika		designated across twenty-nine prefectures			1.1	
*Japanese crane Grus japonensis タンチョウ; Tanchō					1.2	
*Oriental stork Ciconia boyciana コウノトリ kōnotori		breeding programme at Tama Zoo and reintroduction programme at Hyōgo Park of the Oriental White Stork (兵庫県立コウノトリの郷公園)			1.2	
*Tosa onagadori Gallus gallus domesticus 土佐のオナガドリ; Tosa no onagadori		designation includes populations in Kōchi Prefecture			1.4	
*Japanese giant salamander Andrias japonicus オオサンショウウオ; Õsanshōuo		designated across eighteen prefectures			1.2	
*Oshima cherry Trunk; Prunus speciosa 大島のサクラ株; Ōshima no sakura-kabu	Ōshima			34°45′46″N 139°25′45″E	2.1	
Tsushima Yamaneko; Prionailurus bengalensis euptilurus ツシマヤマネコ; Tsushima yamaneko		designation includes populations in Nagasaki Prefecture; breeding programme at Inokashira Park Zoo		34°12′N 129°14′E	1.1	
Japanese dormouse Glirulus japonicus ヤマネ; Yamane		found in Honshū, Shikoku, and Kyūshū			1.1	
Golden eagle Aquila chrysaetos イヌワシ; Inuwashi					1.2	
White-tailed eagle Haliaeetus albicilla オジロワシ; Ojirowashi					1.2	
Steller's sea eagle Haliaeetus pelagicus オオワシ; Ōwashi					1.2	
Brent goose Branta bernicla コクガン; Kokugan					1.2	
Bean goose Anser fabalis ヒシクイ; Hishikui					1.2	
Greater white-fronted goose Anser albifrons マガン; Magan					1.2	
Lidth's jay Garrulus lidthi ルリカケス; Rurikakesu		designation includes populations in Kagoshima Prefecture; breeding programme at Ueno Zoo			1.1	
Japanese wood pigeon Columba janthina カラスバト; Karasubato					1.2	
Red-headed wood pigeon Columba janthina nitens アカガシラカラスバト; Akagashira karasubato					1.1	
Koshigaya Eurasian collared dove Streptopelia decaocto 越ヶ谷のシラコバト; Koshigaya no shirakobato		designation includes populations in Saitama Prefecture				
Chinese silk chicken Gallus gallus domesticus 烏骨鶏; Ukkokei					1.4	
Satsumadori; Gallus gallus domesticus 薩摩鶏; Satsumadori		designation includes populations in Kagoshima Prefecture			1.4	
Shamo; Gallus gallus domesticus 軍鶏; Shamo					1.4	
Kurokashiwa; Gallus gallus domesticus 黒柏鶏; Kurokashiwa					1.4	
Shōkoku; Gallus gallus domesticus 小国鶏; Shōkoku					1.4	
Tōmaru; Gallus gallus domesticus 蜀鶏; Tōmaru					1.4	
Kawachiyakko; Gallus gallus domesticus 河内奴鶏; Kawachiyakko		designation includes populations in Mie Prefecture			1.4	
Chabo; Gallus gallus domesticus 矮鶏; Chabo					1.4	
Uzura-chabo; Gallus gallus domesticus 鶉矮鶏; Uzura-chabo		designation includes populations in Kōchi Prefecture			1.4	
Minohisa-chabo; Gallus gallus domesticus 蓑曳矮鶏; Minohisa-chabo		designation includes populations in Kōchi Prefecture			1.4	
Hinai-dori; Gallus gallus domesticus 比内鶏; Hinai-dori		designation includes populations in Akita Prefecture			1.4	
Tokyo bitterling Tanakia tanago ミヤコタナゴ; Miyako tanago					1.1	
Edo Castle Site Luminous moss Habitat; Schistostega pennata 江戸城跡のヒカリゴケ生育地; Edo-jō ato no hikarigoke seiiku-chi	Chiyoda			35°41′26″N 139°44′55″E	2.7	
Tori-shima 鳥島; Tori-shima	Hachijō Subprefecture			30°29′04″N 140°18′04″E		
South Iwo Jima 南硫黄島; Minami Iō-jima	Ogasawara			24°14′06″N 141°27′45″E		
Ogasawara Minami-jima Submerged Karst Topography 小笠原南島の沈水カルスト地形; Ogasawara Minami-jima no chinsui karusuto chikei	Ogasawara			27°02′32″N 142°10′22″E		
Former Imperial Land in Shirogane 旧白金御料地 kyū-Shirogane goryōchi	Minato, Shinagawa	also an Historic Site; now the Institute for Nature Study (属自然教育園), administered by the National Museum of Nature and Science		35°38′19″N 139°43′10″E		

== Metropolitan Natural Monuments ==
As of 1 May 2020, sixty-two Natural Monuments have been designated at a prefectural (metropolitan) level.

== Municipal Natural Monuments ==
As of 1 May 2020, one hundred and ninety-seven Natural Monuments have been designated at a municipal level.

== See also ==
- Cultural Properties of Japan
- Parks and gardens in Tokyo
- List of Places of Scenic Beauty of Japan (Tokyo)
- List of Historic Sites of Japan (Tokyo)
- Extinct: Bonin wood pigeon, Bonin thrush, Bonin grosbeak, Bonin nankeen night heron, Iwo Jima rail, Mukojima white-eye, Sturdee's pipistrelle
