= List of Natural Monuments of Japan (Kagoshima) =

This list is of the Natural Monuments of Japan within the Prefecture of Kagoshima.

== National Natural Monuments ==
As of 1 April 2021, forty-eight Natural Monuments have been designated, including seven *Special Natural Monuments.

Monument	Municipality	Comments	Image	Coordinates	Type	Ref.
*Amami rabbit Pentalagus furnessi アマミノクロウサギ; Amami no kuro-usagi			Amami rabbit		1.1	
*Yakushima Primeval Cryptomeria Forest; Cryptomeria japonica 屋久島スギ原始林; Yakushima sugi genshi-rin	Yakushima			30°19′43″N 130°30′15″E	2.2	
Japanese dormouse Glirulus japonicus ヤマネ; Yamane		found in Honshū, Shikoku, and Kyūshū			1.1	
Spinous country-rats Tokudaia トゲネズミ; Togenezumi		designation includes populations in Okinawa Prefecture			1.1	
Ryukyu long-tailed giant rat Diplothrix legata ケナガネズミ; Kenaganezumi		designation includes populations in Okinawa Prefecture			1.1	
Erabu fruit bat Pteropus dasymallus dasymallus エラブオオコウモリ; Erabu ōkōmori					1.1	
Amami woodpecker Dendrocopos leucotos owstoni オーストンオオアカゲラ; Ōsuton ōakagera					1.1	
Lidth's jay Garrulus lidthi ルリカケス; Rurikakesu					1.1	
Ryukyu robin Larvivora komadori アカヒゲ; Akahige		designation includes populations in Nagasaki Prefecture and Okinawa Prefecture			1.1	
Amami thrush Zoothera major オオトラツグミ; Ootoratsugumi					1.1	
Izu thrush Turdus celaenops アカコッコ; Akakokko		designation includes populations in Tokyo			1.1	
Ijima's leaf warbler Phylloscopus ijimae イイジマムシクイ; Iijima-mushikui		designation includes populations in Tokyo and Okinawa Prefecture	Ijima's leaf warbler		1.1	
Japanese wood pigeon Columba janthina カラスバト; Karasubato					1.2	
Satsumadori; Gallus gallus domesticus 薩摩鶏; Satsumadori					1.4	
Jidokko; Gallus gallus domesticus 地頭鶏; Jidokko					1.4	
Hermit crab Coenobita オカヤドカリ; Okayadokori		designation includes populations in Tokyo and Okinawa Prefecture				
Mount Inao 稲尾岳; Inao-dake	Kimotsuki, Kinkō, Minamiōsumi	also a Nature Conservation Area and Forest Biosphere Reserve		31°07′37″N 130°52′53″E		

== Prefectural Natural Monuments ==
As of 1 June 2020, forty-eight Natural Monuments have been designated at a prefectural level.

Monument	Municipality	Comments	Image	Coordinates	Type	Ref.
Tokara horse Equus ferus caballus トカラウマ; Tokara-uma	Toshima					for all refs see
Ushi horse Skeleton; Equus ferus caballus ウシウマの骨格; Ushi-uma no kokkaku	Kagoshima	at Kagoshima Prefectural Museum (鹿児島県立博物館)		31°35′39″N 130°33′10″E		
Shōryū Cave 昇竜洞; Shōryūdō	China		Shōryū Cave	27°21′45″N 128°33′09″E		
Anderson's crocodile newt Echinotriton andersoni イボイモリ; Iboimori		on Amami Ōshima and Tokunoshima				
Odorrana splendida イシカワガエル; Ishikawa-gaeru		on Amami Ōshima	Odorrana splendida			
Kuroiwa's ground gecko Goniurosaurus kuroiwae オビトカゲモドキ; Obitokagemodoki		on Tokunoshima				
Otton frog Babina subaspera オットンガエル; Otton-gaeru		on Amami Ōshima and Kakeromajima	Otton frog			
Amami tip-nosed frog Odorrana amamiensis アマミハナサキガエル; Amami hanasaki-gaeru		on Amami Ōshima and Tokunoshima				
Mishima Sawagani; Geothelphusa dehaani ミシマサワガニ; Mishima sawagani	Mishima, Minamisatsuma, Yakushima	on Kuroshima, Kuchinoerabu-jima, and the Uji Islands (宇治群島)				
Minamitane Town Ingii-dori; Gallus gallus domesticus 南種子町のインギー鶏; Minamitane-chō no ingii-dori	Minamitane					
Mitsjama salamander Hynobius nebulosus カスミサンショウウオ; Kasumisanshōuo	Akune, Izumi					
Satsuma Meteorite 薩摩隕石; Satsuma-inseki	Kagoshima	at Kagoshima Prefectural Museum (鹿児島県立博物館)	Satsuma Meteorite	31°35′39″N 130°33′10″E		
Ibusuki City Chiringashima Tombolo 指宿市知林ヶ島のトンボロ; Ibusuki-shi Chiringashima no tonboro	Ibusuki			31°35′39″N 130°33′10″E		
Veins of Yakushima's Hayasaki Coast 屋久島早崎海岸の鉱脈群; Yakushima Hayasaki kaigan no kōmyaku-gun	Yakushima					

== Municipal Natural Monuments ==
As of 1 May 2020, one hundred and seventy-nine Natural Monuments have been designated at a municipal level.

== See also ==
- Cultural Properties of Japan
- Parks and gardens in Kagoshima Prefecture
- List of Places of Scenic Beauty of Japan (Kagoshima)
- List of Historic Sites of Japan (Kagoshima)
