= Ushi =

Ushi may refer to:

- Ushi, Armenia
- Ushi, Bulgaria
- Ushi Hirosaki, character in the Dutch comedy programme Ushi & Dushi
- USHI, ICAO code for Igrim Airport
- An extinct breed of horse in Japan, see extinct native Japanese horse breeds
