= List of Natural Monuments of Japan (Kōchi) =

This list is of the Natural Monuments of Japan within the Prefecture of Kōchi.

== National Natural Monuments ==
As of 1 April 2021, twenty-eight Natural Monuments have been designated, including five *Special Natural Monuments; Miune-Tenguzuka Miyama kumazasa and Rhododendron tschonoskii Communities spans the prefectural borders with Tokushima.

Monument	Municipality	Comments	Image	Coordinates	Type	Ref.
*Japanese serow Capricornis crispus カモシカ; Kamoshika		designated across thirty prefectures			1.1	
*Otter; Lutrinae カワウソ; Kawauso					1.2	
*Tosa onagadori Gallus gallus domesticus 土佐のオナガドリ; Tosa no onagadori					1.4	
*Kōchi City Common jay and its Habitat; Graphium doson 高知市のミカドアゲハおよびその生息地; Kōchi-shi no mikadoageha oyobi sono seisoku-chi	Kōchi			33°32′55″N 133°32′01″E	2.2	
*Sugi no Ōsugi 杉の大スギ; Sugi no ōsugi	Ōtoyo			33°45′15″N 133°39′48″E	2.1	
Tosa; Canis familiaris 土佐犬; Tosa-ken					1.4	
Japanese dormouse Glirulus japonicus ヤマネ; Yamane		found in Honshū, Shikoku, and Kyūshū			1.1	
Shamo; Gallus gallus domesticus 軍鶏; Shamo					1.4	
Tōtenkō; Gallus gallus domesticus 東天紅鶏; Tōtenkō					1.4	
Uzura-chabo; Gallus gallus domesticus 鶉矮鶏; Uzura-chabo					1.4	
Minohisa-chabo; Gallus gallus domesticus 蓑曳矮鶏; Minohisa-chabo					1.4	
Local pedigree chicken Gallus gallus domesticus 地鶏; Jidori					1.4	
Ioki Cave Fern Communities; Pteridopsida 伊尾木洞のシダ群落; Ioki-dō no shida gunraku	Aki			33°29′29″N 133°56′02″E	2.7	
Ōtani Camphor tree Cinnamomum camphora 大谷のクス; Ōtani no kusu	Susaki			33°23′09″N 133°19′07″E	2.1	
Ōhikiwari-Kohikiwari 大引割・小引割; Ōhikiwari・Kohikiwari	Niyodogawa, Tsuno			33°28′33″N 133°02′42″E	3.3,5,9	
Mount Kanbaramatsuo Tachibana Communities; Citrus tachibana 甲原松尾山のタチバナ群落; Kanbaramatsuo-yama no tachibana gunraku	Tosa			33°29′42″N 133°22′01″E	2.3,4	
Goshiki Beach Yokonami Mélange 五色ノ浜の横浪メランジュ; Goshiki no hama no Yokonami meranju	Tosa			33°25′37″N 133°27′28″E	3.1,2,3,7	
Kotsurutsu Okitsu Mélange and Pseudotachylyte 小鶴津の興津メランジュ及びシュードタキライト; Kotsurutsu no Okitsu meranju oyobi shūdotakiraito	Shimanto			33°13′18″N 133°14′49″E	3.1,2,3,7	
Cape Chihiro Fossil Ripples 千尋岬の化石漣痕; Chihiro-misaki no kaseki renkon	Tosashimizu			32°46′27″N 132°52′23″E	3.1,5,7	
Tenjin Giant Cryptomeria; Cryptomeria japonica 天神の大スギ; Tenjin no ōsugi	Kōnan			33°33′44″N 133°45′05″E	2.1	
Tōsen-jima Rising Coast 唐船島の隆起海岸; Tōsen-jima no ryūki kaigan	Tosashimizu			32°46′34″N 132°58′04″E	3.5	
Niida Ehretia acuminata 仁井田のヒロハチシャノキ; Niida no hirohachishanoki	Shimanto			33°16′38″N 133°09′04″E	2.1	
Hiraishi Chichi-Ginkgo; Ginkgo biloba 平石の乳イチョウ; Hiraishi no chichi-ichō	Tosa			33°42′56″N 133°29′19″E	2.1	
Matsuo Sea fig Native Soil; Ficus superba 松尾のアコウ自生地; Matsuo no akō jisei-chi	Tosashimizu			32°44′05″N 132°59′09″E	2.10	
Cape Muroto Subtropical Forest and Coastal Plant Communities; Ficus superba 室戸岬亜熱帯性樹林及海岸植物群落; Muroto-misaki anettai-sei jurin oyobi kaigan shokubutsu gunraku	Muroto			33°14′51″N 134°10′54″E	2.2,5,10	
Yatsuka Alsophila acaulis Native Soil 八束のクサマルハチ自生地; Yatsuka no kusamaruhachi jisei-chi	Shimanto			32°58′14″N 132°57′07″E	2.12	
Ryūga Cave 龍河洞; Ryūga-dō	Kami	also an Historic Site		33°36′12″N 133°44′44″E	3.3,6	
Miune-Tenguzuka Miyama kumazasa and Rhododendron tschonoskii Communities 三嶺・天狗塚のミヤマクマザサ及びコメツツジ群落; Miune・Tenguzuka no miyama-kuma-zasa oyobi kometsutsuji gunraku	Kami	designation includes areas of Miyoshi in Tokushima Prefecture		33°50′26″N 133°58′48″E	2.2	

April 2021

== Prefectural Natural Monuments ==
As of 1 March 2021, forty-two Natural Monuments have been designated at a prefectural level.

Monument	Municipality	Comments	Image	Coordinates	Type	Ref.
Tosa; Canis familiaris 土佐闘犬; Tosa-tōken						
Fairy pitta Pitta nympha ヤイロチョウ; Yairochō						
Tosakin; Carassius auratus 土佐金魚; Tosa-kingyō						
Nagasawa Falls 長沢の滝; Nagasawa-no-taki	Tsuno, Yusuhara	also a Prefectural Place of Scenic Beauty		33°25′51″N 132°59′44″E		

== Municipal Natural Monuments ==
As of 1 May 2020, two hundred and thirty-one Natural Monuments have been designated at a municipal level.

== See also ==
- Cultural Properties of Japan
- Parks and gardens in Kōchi Prefecture
- List of Places of Scenic Beauty of Japan (Kōchi)
- List of historic sites of Japan (Kōchi)
