= Creeper chickens =

Chickens with short legs

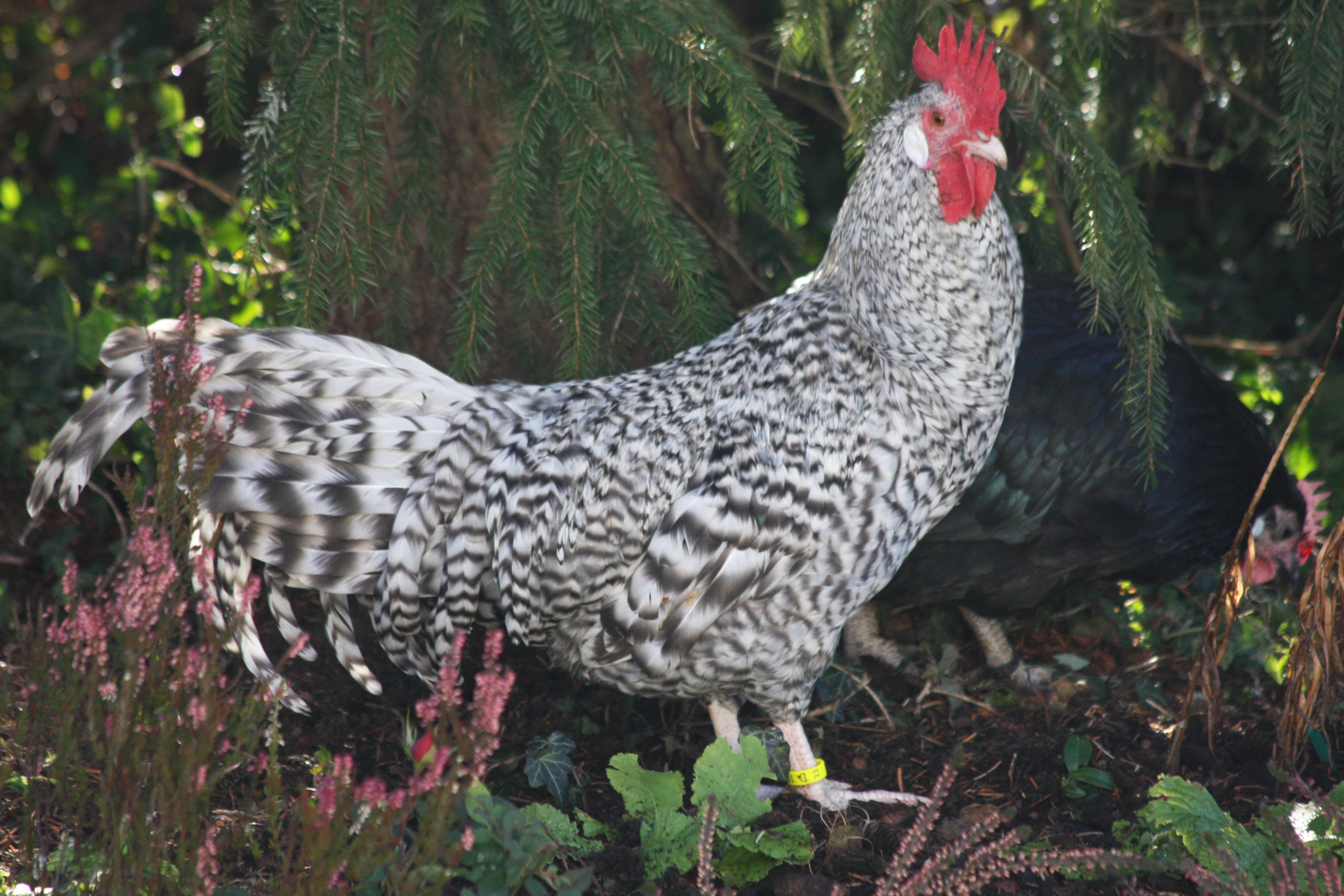
Krüper cock; the legs are much shorter than in other breeds

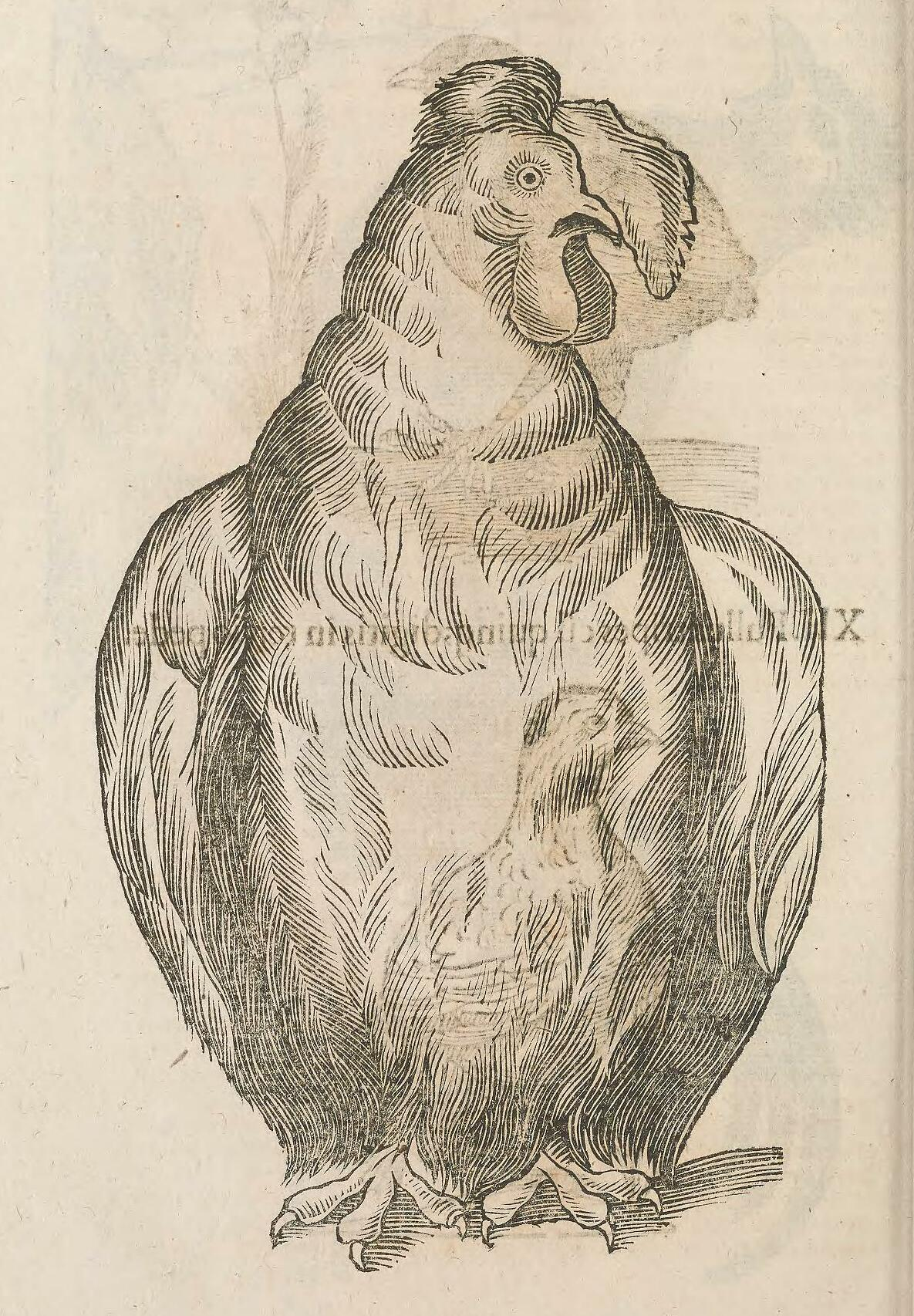
Illustration from the Monstrorum Historia of Ulisse Aldrovandi, published posthumously in Bologna, 1642

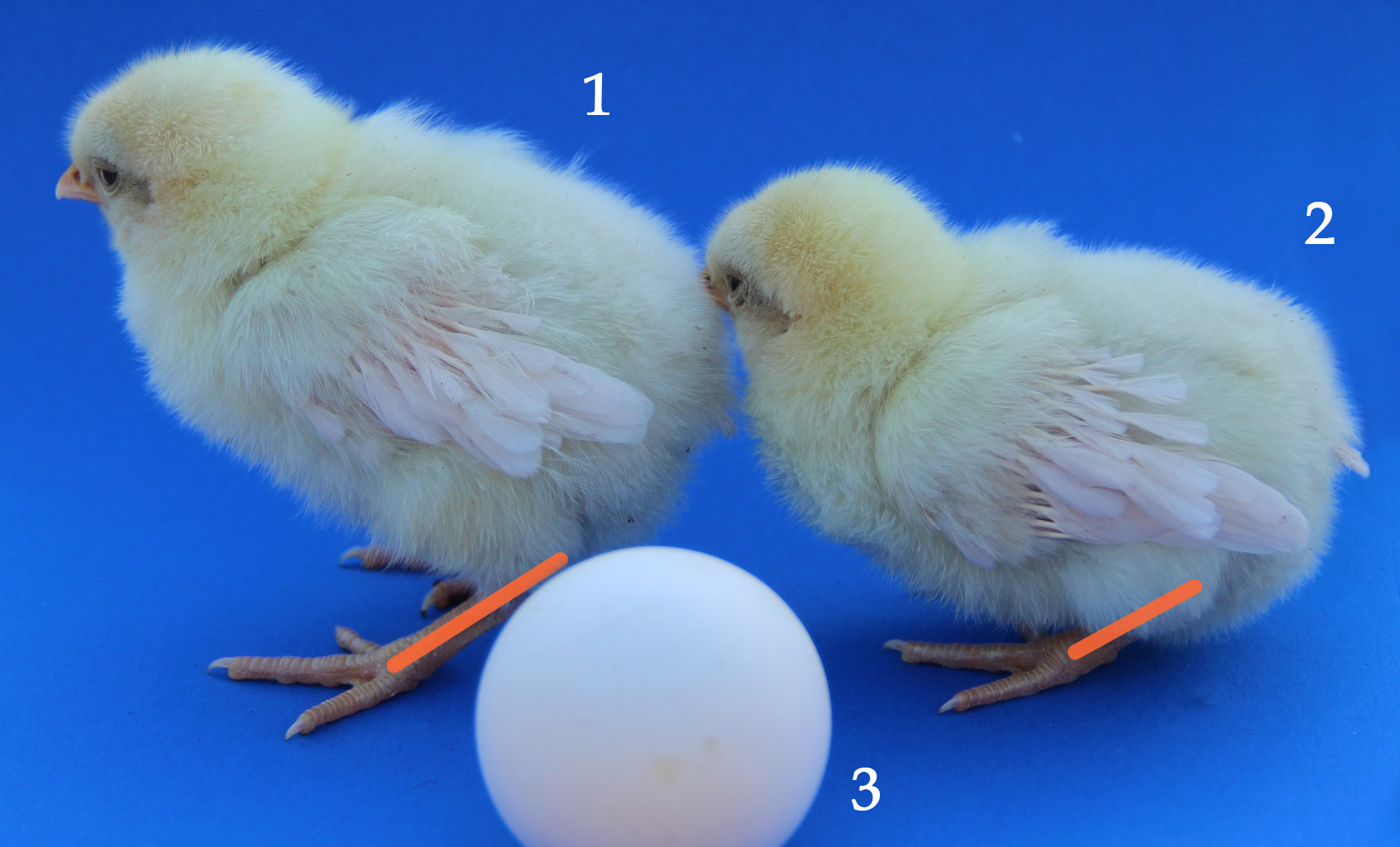
Bantam Krüper chicks and egg: left, long-legged chick; right, short-legged chick (length of tarsometatarsus marked in orange)

Creeper chickens are characterised by abnormally short legs, so short that the body is carried a few centimetres from the ground. This chondrodystrophy (dwarfism) is caused by a dominant lethal allele, Cp. A number of breeds display the characteristic, among them the Chabo and Jitokku breeds of Japan, the Courte-pattes of France, the Krüper of Germany, the Luttehøns of Denmark, and the Scots Dumpy. They have been called by many names, among them bakies, brevicrews, corlaighs, crawlers, creepers, creepies, dumpfries, dumpies and jumpers.

== History ==
Creeper chickens have been known and described since Renaissance times at least. Chickens of this type were described and illustrated in the Monstrorum Historia of the Bolognese naturalist Ulisse Aldrovandi (1522–1605), published posthumously in 1642 with text by Bartolomeo Ambrosini. In his The Variation of Animals and Plants Under Domestication of 1868, Charles Darwin writes that creeper chickens were among the types described in a Chinese encyclopaedia compiled from earlier sources and published in 1596.

They have been called by many names, among them bakies, brevicrews, corlaighs, crawlers, creepers, creepies, dumpfries, dumpies and jumpers.

The creeper gene was described by Ira Eugene Cutler in 1925, and confirmed by Walter Landauer and L.C. Dunn in 1930. The symbol Cp was assigned to it by Frederick Hutt in 1933. It was shown to be present in the Chabo by Landauer in 1942, in the Jitokko by S. Okamoto in the same year, and in the Gan-Dori and Miyaji-Dori by Tohru Shibuya in 1972.

== Biology ==
The short legs of creeper chickens are the result of autosomal dominant transmission of a lethal allele, Cp. Affected birds are heterozygous (Cp/+) for the gene; homozygotes (Cp/Cp) die at the embryo stage. The Cp trait is linked closely to the gene for the rose comb, MNR2.

Shortening of the leg bones is also observed in Indian Game, and some birds carry a lethal allele. It is quite different to that of the creeper; Hutt assigned it the symbol Cl.
