= Ancon sheep =

Breed of sheep

- Conservation status: Extinct (1968)
- Other names: Otter sheep
- Country of origin: United States

Traits
- Weight: Male: 45 lb (20 kg)
- Wool color: White
- Face color: White

Notes
- Dwarf

Ancon sheep (also called "Otter" sheep) were a grouping of domestic sheep with long bodies and very short legs, with the fore-legs being crooked. The term is generally applied to a line of sheep bred from a single affected lamb born in 1791 in Massachusetts, USA. The breed was artificially selected and maintained for its desirable inability to jump over fences. It was allowed to go extinct in 1876 when it was no longer required.

The name "Ancon" has also been applied to other strains of sheep arising from individuals with the same phenotype, such as a Norwegian stock bred from a single individual born in 1919, and a Texan, USA stock bred from a single individual born in 1962. These lineages were also allowed to go extinct after scientists no longer needed them for genetic research.

Excavations in Leicester, UK have also revealed metacarpals, metatarsals and phalanges characteristic of Ancon sheep that date to approximately AD 1500, thereby demonstrating that the phenotype has arisen independently at least four times.

The unique features of ancon sheep are caused by a recessive dwarf mutation, which often results in crippling. The specific effect of the mutation is to cause chondrodystrophy.

== Significance to the history of biology ==
Despite the Ancon's small numbers, the sheep's contribution to the history of biology has been substantial. Several chapters in Charles Darwin's On the Origin of Species refer to the Ancon as an example of his argument that offspring inherit independent characteristics from their parents. The notion is perhaps best understood by the claim it denounces: the long-held belief among naturalists and breeders that inherited traits were a "blending" of the traits of each parent. If that were true, the offspring of an Ancon and a common sheep would have a height between those of the parents. Instead, the resulting offspring were either Ancon or common, thus supporting Darwin's contention.

Darwin's review of the Ancon sheep helped lead to the establishment of an early consensus view of the sheep's role in understanding biology. Darwin referred to the Ancon as a "sport", or a new species or breed born suddenly from a prior species (as a form of phylogenetic variation, not to be confused with the "sporting plant" referred to in the study of botany) as opposed to a new species developing gradually over a long period of time through the natural selection of multiple traits.

Darwin believed that this was possible because the Ancon sheep were born and bred in captivity. In his 1868 work The Variation of Animals and Plants Under Domestication, Darwin argued that sudden mutations such as the Ancon are rare to non-existent outside of captivity. In his view, species change through the mutation and natural selection of minor traits which, when added up over time, gradually establish new species. Later scholars supporting Darwin's view also pointed out that the Ancon sheep had essentially a single trait - their short legs - which also made rapid mutation unusually likely, since other species and breeds are set apart from their progenitors by many traits.
