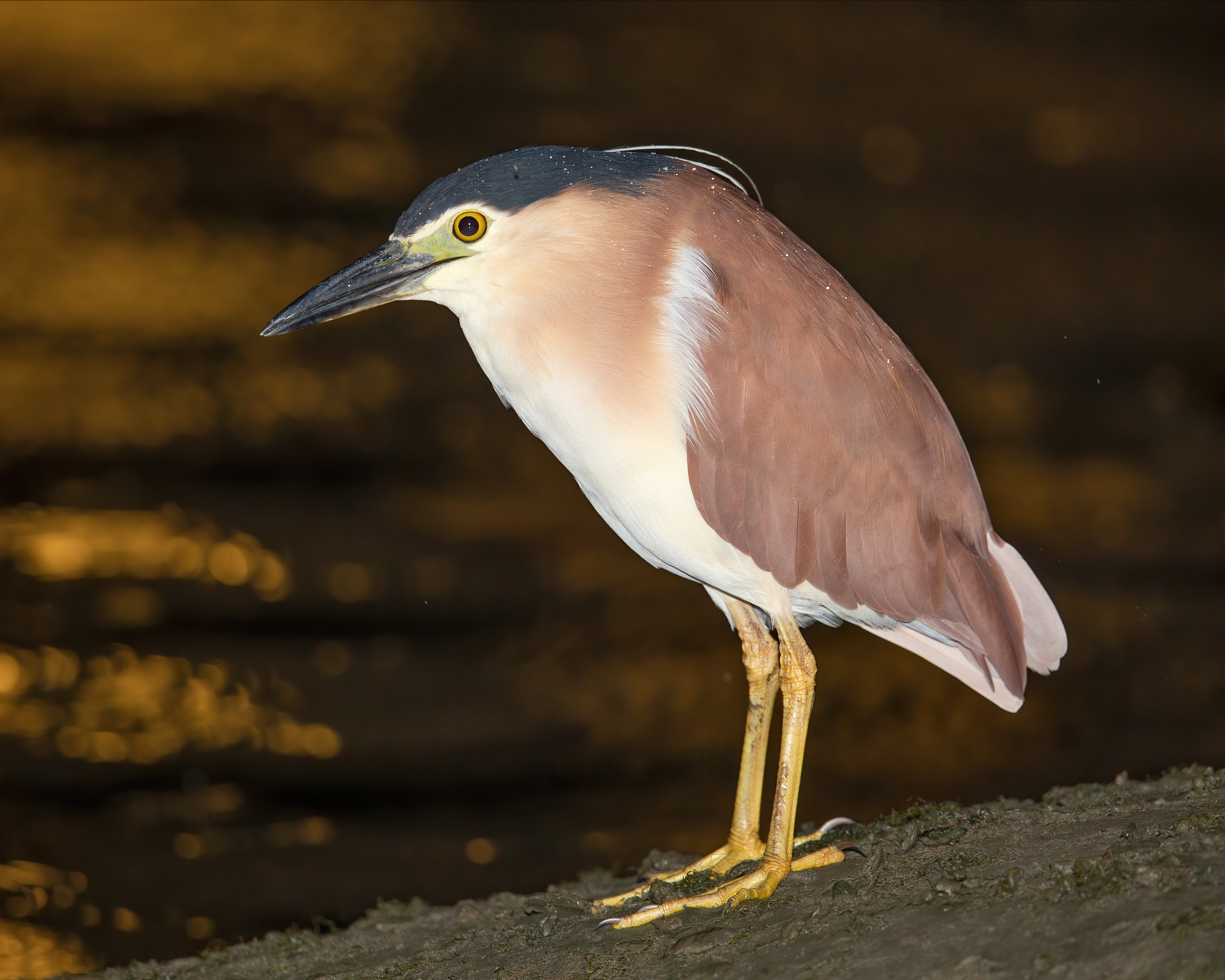
- In Sydney, New South Wales

Conservation status
- Least Concern (IUCN 3.1)

Scientific classification
- Kingdom: Animalia
- Phylum: Chordata
- Class: Aves
- Order: Pelecaniformes
- Family: Ardeidae
- Genus: Nycticorax
- Species: N. caledonicus

Binomial name
- Nycticorax caledonicus (Gmelin, 1789)

Subspecies
- N. c. caledonicus (Gmelin, 1789); N. c. manillensis Vigors, 1831; †N. c. crassirostris Vigors, 1839; N. c. mandibularis Ogilvie-Grant, 1888; N. c. australasiae (Vieillot, 1823); N. c. pelewensis Mathews, 1926

Synonyms
- Ardea caledonica Gmelin, 1789

= Nankeen night heron =

Species of bird

The nankeen night heron (Nycticorax caledonicus) is a heron that belongs to the genus Nycticorax and the family Ardeidae. Due to its distinctive reddish-brown colour, it is also commonly referred to as the rufous night heron. It is primarily nocturnal and is observed in a broad range of habitats, including forests, meadows, shores, reefs, marshes, grasslands, and swamps. The species is 55 to 65 cm (22 to 26 in) in length, with rich cinnamon upperparts and white underparts. The nankeen night heron has a stable population size, and is classified as a species of least concern by the International Union for Conservation of Nature (IUCN).

== Taxonomy ==
The nankeen night heron was formally described in 1789 by the German naturalist Johann Friedrich Gmelin in his revised and expanded edition of Carl Linnaeus's Systema Naturae. He placed it with herons, cranes and storks in the genus Ardea and coined the binomial name Ardea caledonica. Gmelin based his description on the "Caledonian night heron" that had been described in 1875 by the English ornithologist John Latham in his multi-volume work A General Synopsis of Birds. The heron had been observed in September 1774 on the island of New Caledonia during Captain James Cook's second voyage to the Pacific Ocean. The naturalist Johann Reinhold Forster, who had accompanied Cook on the voyage, provided Latham with a description of the species. The nankeen night heron is now placed in the genus Nycticorax that was introduced in 1817 by the English naturalist Thomas Forster to accommodate the black-crowned night heron. The epithet nycticorax is from Ancient Greek and combines nux, nuktos meaning "night" and korax meaning "raven". The word was used by authors such as Aristotle and Hesychius of Miletus for a "bird of ill omen", perhaps an owl. The word was used by the Swiss naturalist Conrad Gessner in 1555 and then by subsequent authors for the black-crowned night heron. The term nankeen in the common name of the species is defined as 'a type of pale-yellow cotton cloth, originally from China' in the Cambridge Dictionary. The term originates from the city of Nanjing, which is where the material was first made. In the alternative name of the species, rufous night heron, the word rufous refers to a reddish-brown colour and more accurately describes the colour of the bird's plumage. This name is widely used in regions such as New Guinea and Wallacea.

Six subspecies are recognised (five extant and one extinct):

- N. c. crassirostris Vigors, 1839 – Bonin Islands (Ogasawara Is.; east Japan)(extinct)
- N. c. manillensis Vigors, 1831 – Philippines and north Borneo
- N. c. australasiae (Vieillot, 1823) – Java east to New Guinea, northwest Bismarck Archipelago, Australia and New Zealand
- N. c. pelewensis Mathews, 1926 – Palau and Caroline Islands (south Micronesia)
- N. c. caledonicus (Gmelin, 1789) – Grande Terre (New Caledonia)
- N. c. mandibularis Ogilvie-Grant, 1888 – east Bismarck Archipelago and Solomon Islands except Temotu (Santa Cruz Islands; southeast Solomon Islands)

== Description ==
The nankeen night heron is a medium-sized heron. The adult male is 55 to 65 cm in length, while the female is slightly smaller, measuring 55 to 60 cm. Its weight varies from 810 g to 1014 g, and the wingspan ranges from 95 to 105 cm. Other than females being smaller in most measurements, the sexes of the nankeen night heron are alike in appearance.

The nankeen night heron has a heavy black bill, which is similar in length as its head. The face is white with a cinnamon tint, and the nape and crown of breeding adults is a grey-black. During the breeding season, there are also usually two or three thin, white plumes from the crown in a downward direction to the neck. These are tipped with black when newly grown. The heron has a rich chestnut colour across the upperparts, and the colours are more intense in the breeding season. The underparts of the nankeen night heron are white, and there is a gradual blend of the chestnut colour and the white on its neck and upper breast. The back, tail, and upper wing of the bird are a rich rufous colour. The iris is of a straw yellow and can be tinged with orange during the breeding season, while the legs and feet are a creamy yellow. Their legs are relatively shorter than that of other herons, and can become bright pink during courtship and early breeding.

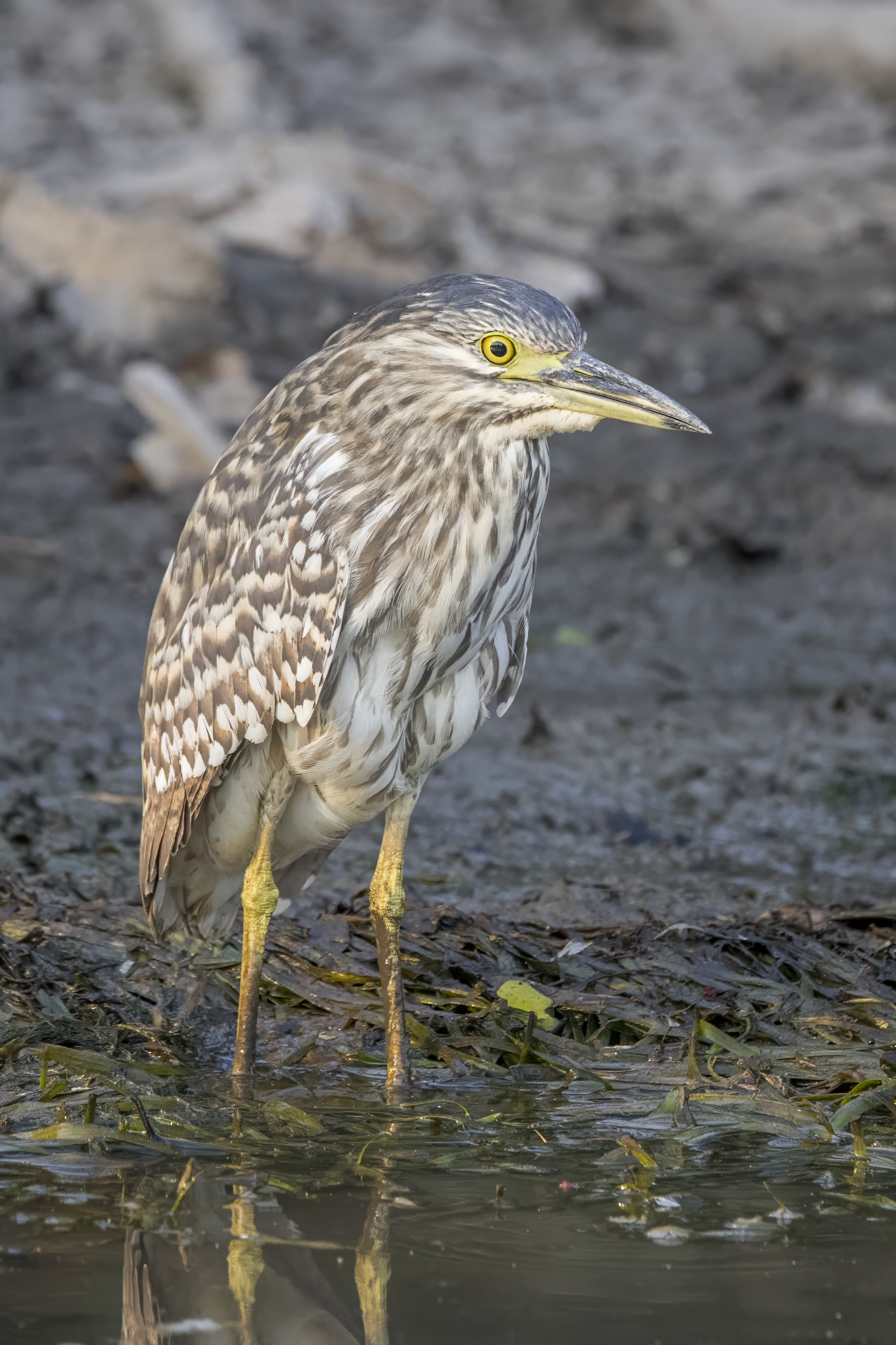
N. c. australasiae immature

Juvenile nankeen night herons are quite different in appearance compared to adults, with the top of their head and their nape being a black-brown colour and streaked with beige. The upper throat and chin are white, while the rest of the neck is heavily streaked with brown. The tail of juveniles is rufous-brown, the legs and feet are lime-green to olive-grey, and the bill is a dull olive-yellow colour with black on the tip. Nankeen night heron chicks are covered with dark brown down feather on their back and white on the undersides. They have cream coloured beaks with a dark grey edge, and the legs are olive.

=== Voice ===
Adult male nankeen night herons give a qu-arck sound when departing their roost at night, while females and juvenile nankeen night herons give a higher pitched qu-ook sound. When disturbed during roosting, the heron gives a short, deep quock. The nankeen night heron gives a hoarse, croaking quok when in flight, and a harsh croak sound while feeding in a group. The threat call of the bird is a rok sound and is used when in aggregations. Nankeen night heron chicks are described to beg with a kak-kakkak call in their first two weeks, in order to obtain the attention of their parents for feeding. They also squawk as they dispute among themselves. After leaving their nest, during the period when they are still flightless, young nankeen night herons utter a noisy high-pitched screech when alarmed.

== Distribution and habitat ==
Nankeen night herons have a broad distribution and are found in Australia, New Zealand, the Philippines, Papua New Guinea, the Solomon Islands, Java, New Caledonia, Palau, and the Caroline Islands, Federated States of Micronesia. They are native to Australia and are widespread in most states of the country except for the west, in which it is rare or absent. Nankeen night herons have six subspecies, which includes the Bonin nankeen night heron (Nycticorax caledonicus crassirostris). This subspecies was endemic to Bonin Islands, Japan, but has been extinct since the late 1800s.

The nankeen night heron is resident in a wide range of habitats, which includes grasslands, meadows, forests, lagoons, beaches, reefs, marshes, shores, wetlands, and swamps. It is most commonly found near rivers and streams. The species prefer habitats with emergent vegetation when near permanent water. The nankeen night heron is mainly nocturnal, and thus roosts during the daytime in dense cover of trees, bushes, and reeds. In more exposed situations, they are also known to roost in dead trees. In urban areas, the nankeen night heron favours nesting and roosting in trees such as cypresses and pines. They also reside in urban wetlands, dry fields, gardens, ponds, airports, and parks.

== Behaviour ==
The nankeen night heron is almost fully nocturnal. They tend to leave roosts shortly after sunset and are most active from dusk to dawn. They are attentive in general, including during roosting, but can be vulnerable to predators when feeding. However, the species remain stable and widespread, and there are no current conservation measures.

Adult nankeen night herons in Australia are observed as partially migratory, moving during winter and major events such as flood and rainfall. Populations that regularly migrate in accordance to seasonal shifts usually move north and can go as far as Papua New Guinea, but some can also arrive in New Zealand, as well as Pacific islands such as Christmas Island, Lord Howe Island, and Cocos-Keeling Island. Other populations of the nankeen night heron are classified as sedentary and hardly migrate at all.

When facing threats, male nankeen night herons will stand fully erect and make rasping sounds or snap its bill, signalling aggressive intentions. As opponents get close, agonistic behaviours of the male nankeen night heron includes pointing and snapping its bill and waving its wing, while crouching and glaring at its opponent. There are no records of agonistic behaviour in female nankeen night herons.

=== Breeding ===
Breeding can occur year-round for the nankeen night heron, but its primary breeding season is October to May in Australia, February to June in Java, and February to May in the Philippines. The timing of the species' breeding is also largely dependent on feeding conditions, such as food availability. Nankeen night herons typically nest in dense trees, but also nest in marshes and swamps. In areas without vegetation, the species can also build nests in caves and under rock overhangs. They often breed within large mixed-species colonies, which can include ibises, cormorants, other heron species, and spoonbills.

Nests of nankeen night herons are loosely constructed with sticks. These are typically 20–30 cm in diameter and 3–4 cm in height, which is just large enough to hold the clutch. Nests that are constructed on the ground can be merely a ring of sticks that prevents the eggs from rolling away. The sticks are collected by the male birds, while the females arrange them in the nest. The building of nests may take place both during the daytime and at night.

The colour of the species' eggs is a pale green-blue, and the clutch ranges from two to five. The mean dimensions of the eggs are 51.50 mm in length and 37.20 mm in width. Incubation typically lasts 21 days, and both parents help incubate and care for the young. Nankeen night heron hatchlings are altricial and fledge around six to seven weeks after birth. The chicks are aggressive to all adults, including parents, that approach the nest. They may leave the nest after around two weeks, and return to be fed. They are fed away from the nest by the third week of hatching.

=== Diet and feeding ===
The main diet of the nankeen night heron consists mostly of aquatic creatures, including freshwater invertebrates, crayfish, sea turtle hatchlings, crabs, and fish species like mosquito fish and carp. Among these, crayfish appears to be the dominant prey. Its other prey include frogs, lizards, mice, as well as insects such as crickets, water beetles, ants, wasps, caterpillars, and dragonfly larvae.

Chicks of nankeen night herons begin begging within hours of hatching. They are initially given liquid food and are provided with semi-solid food after a few days. The young are fed first from mouth to mouth, and later by adults regurgitating into the nest.

Nankeen night herons mainly forage at night and in the morning. Their typical foraging behaviour includes walking slowly, looking into shallow water for prey. However, they can also forage in deep water by plunging from perches. While primarily nocturnal, the species also feeds in the daytime during its breeding season to ensure food availability for the young.

== Conservation status ==
The nankeen night heron has not been evaluated as vulnerable by the IUCN Red List as it does not meet any of the criteria. The species is assessed as stable, as it has a fluctuating but not declining population trend, a very large population size, and an extremely large range, with an estimated extent of occurrence of 31,600,000 km^{2}. The IUCN Red List states that for these reasons, the nankeen night heron is evaluated as a species of least concern.

== Gallery ==
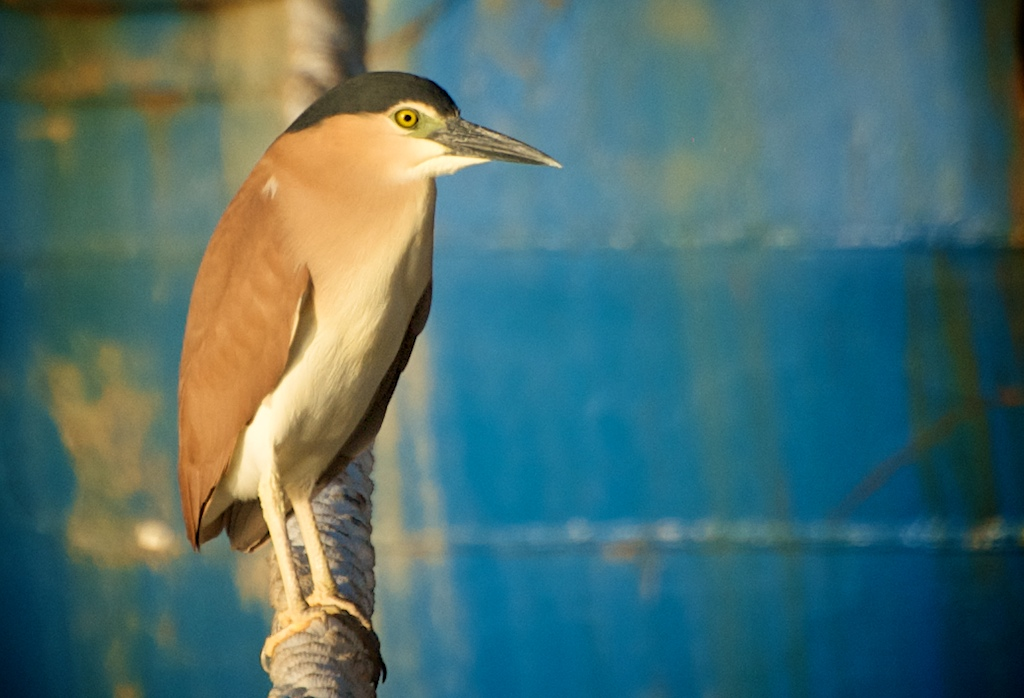
Adult at Fremantle Harbour

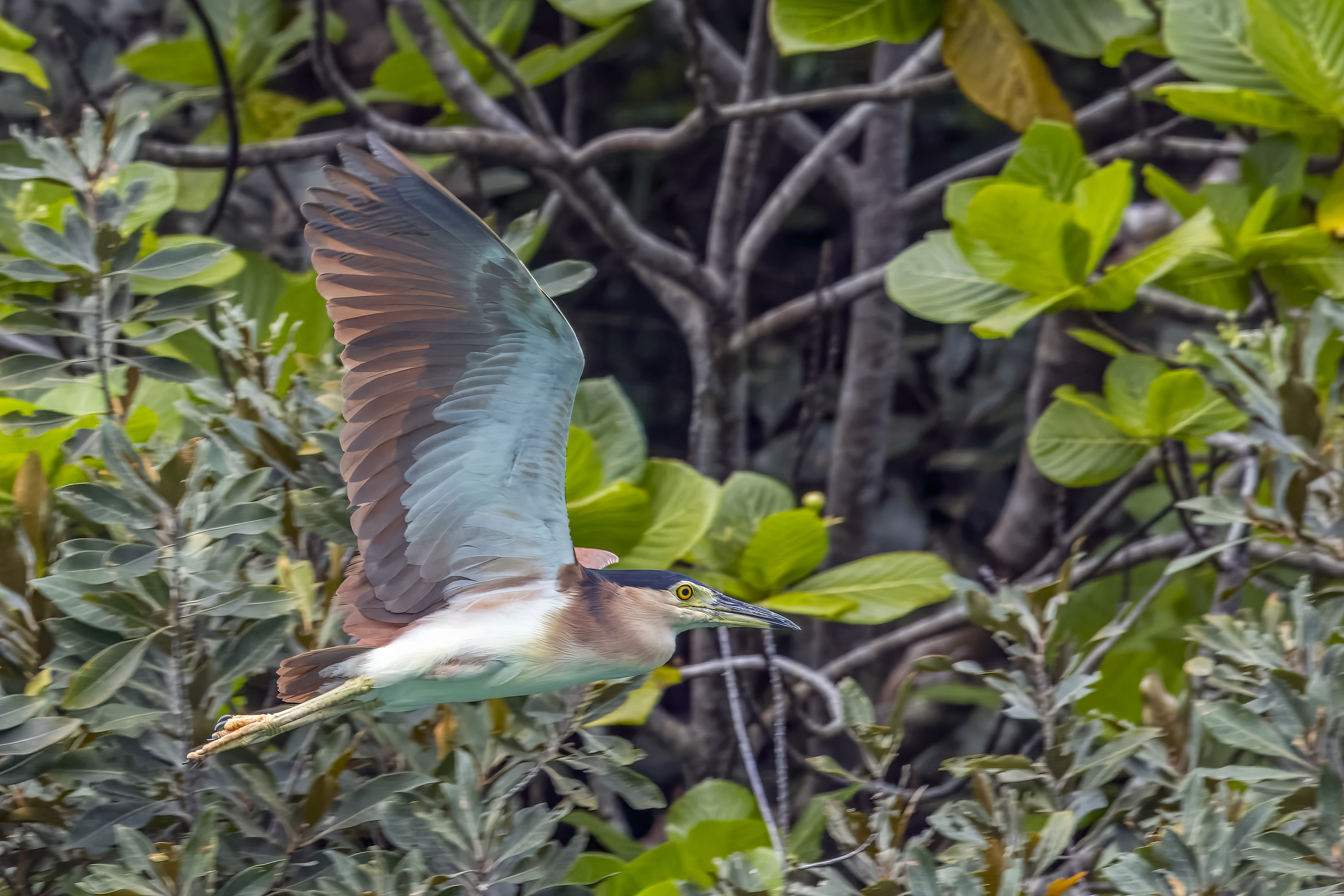
Adult in flight in Palau

Adult at Samsonvale Cemetery, SE Queensland

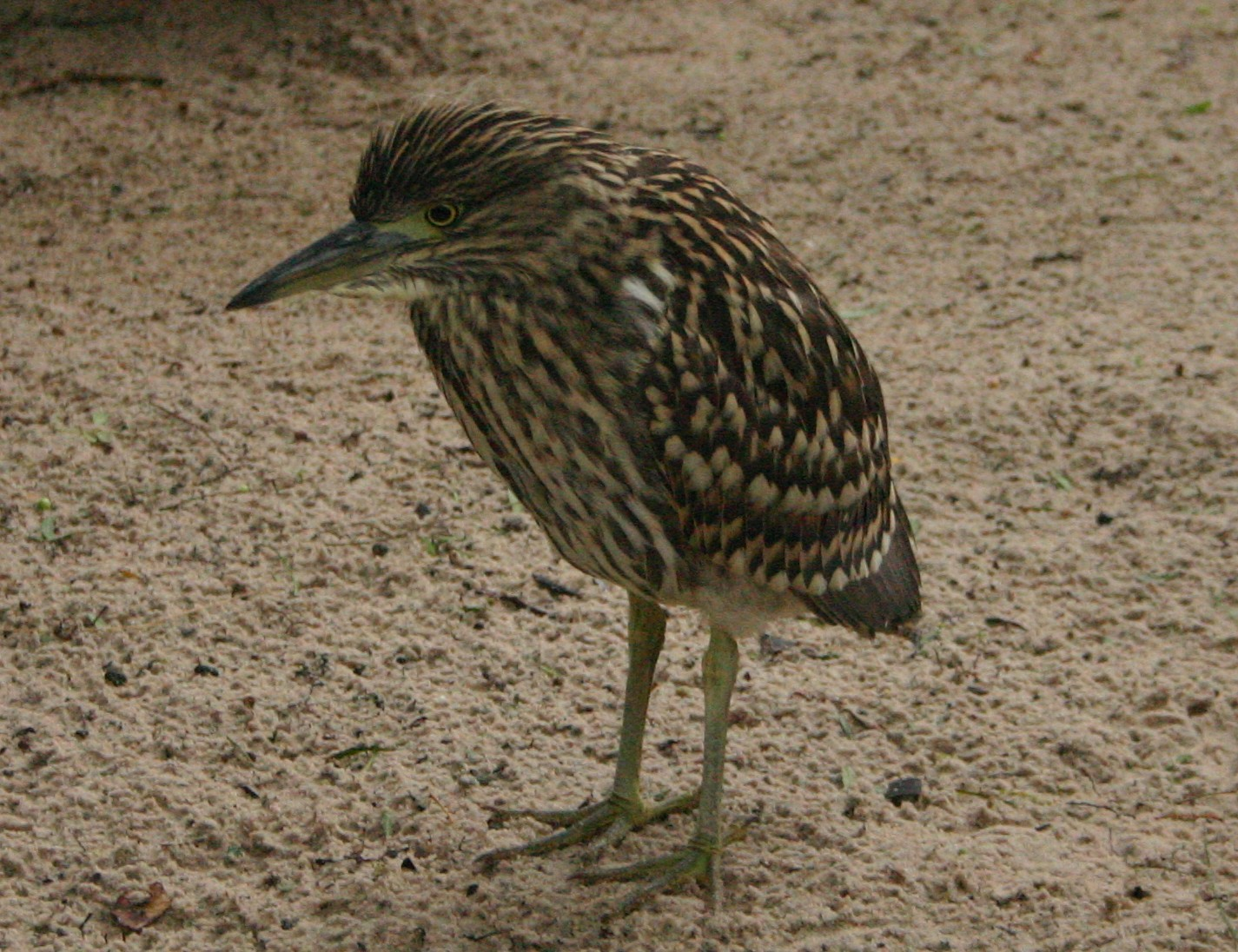
Juvenile visiting the little penguin enclosure at Melbourne Zoo

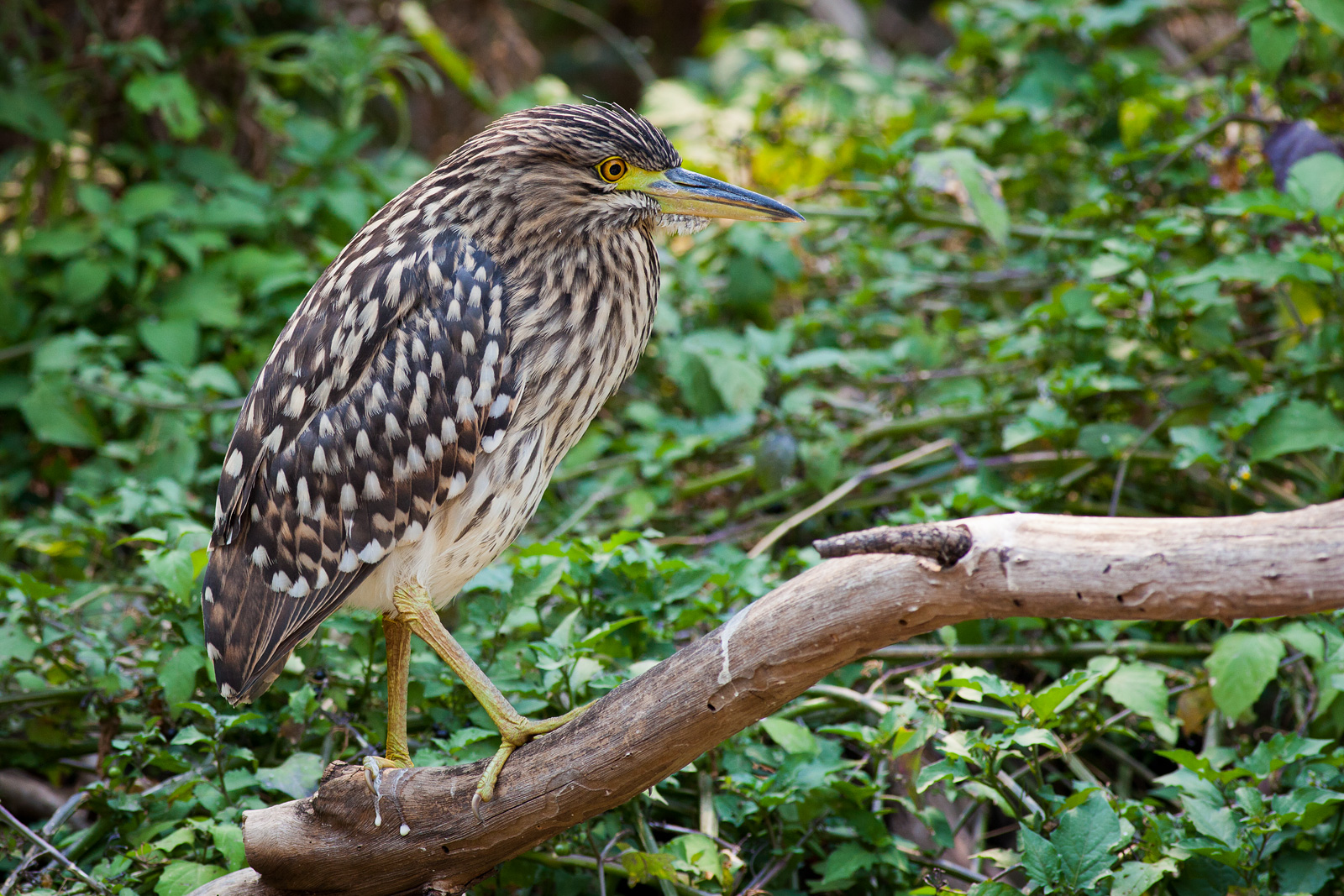
Juvenile perched on fallen tree

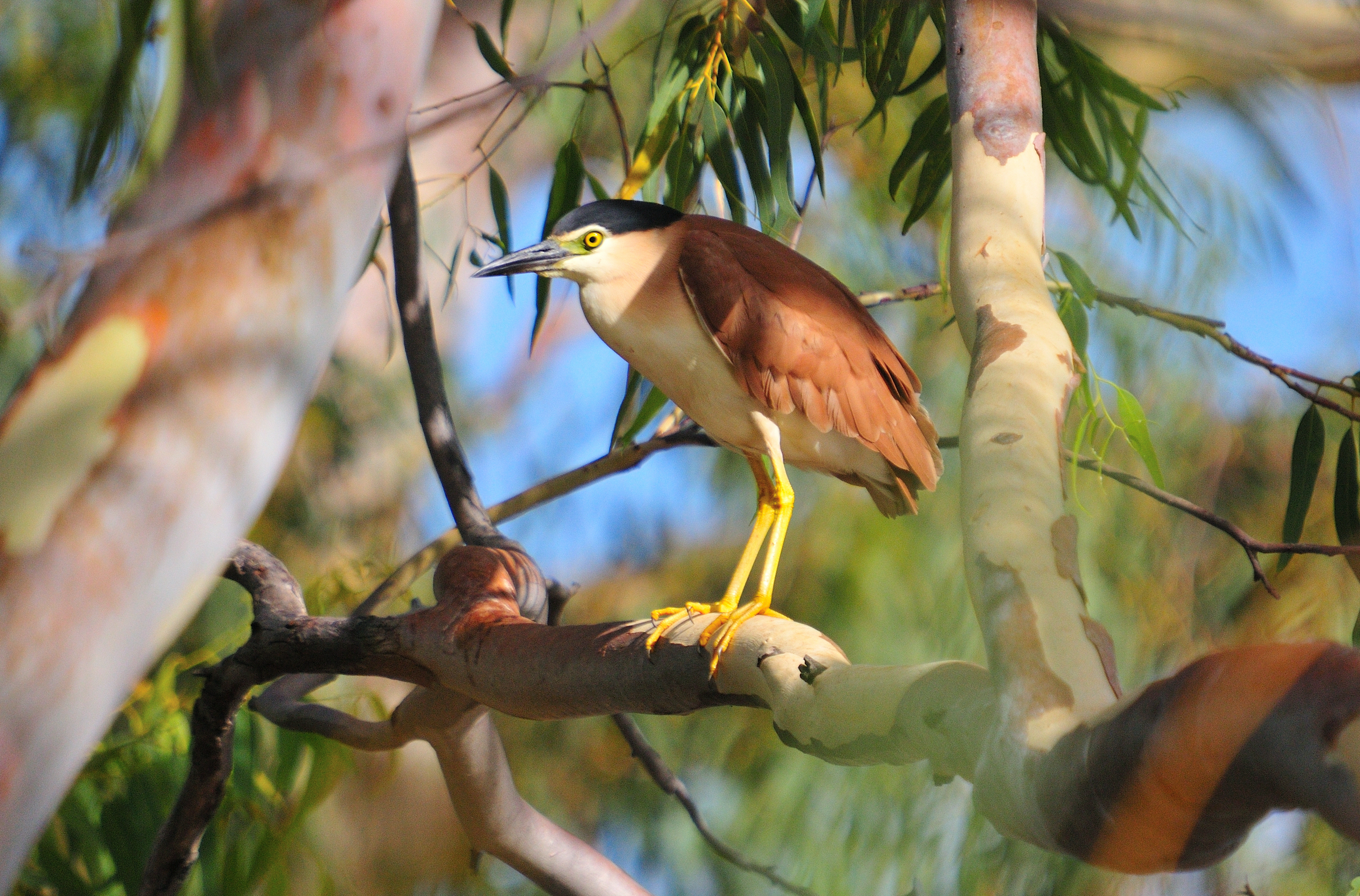

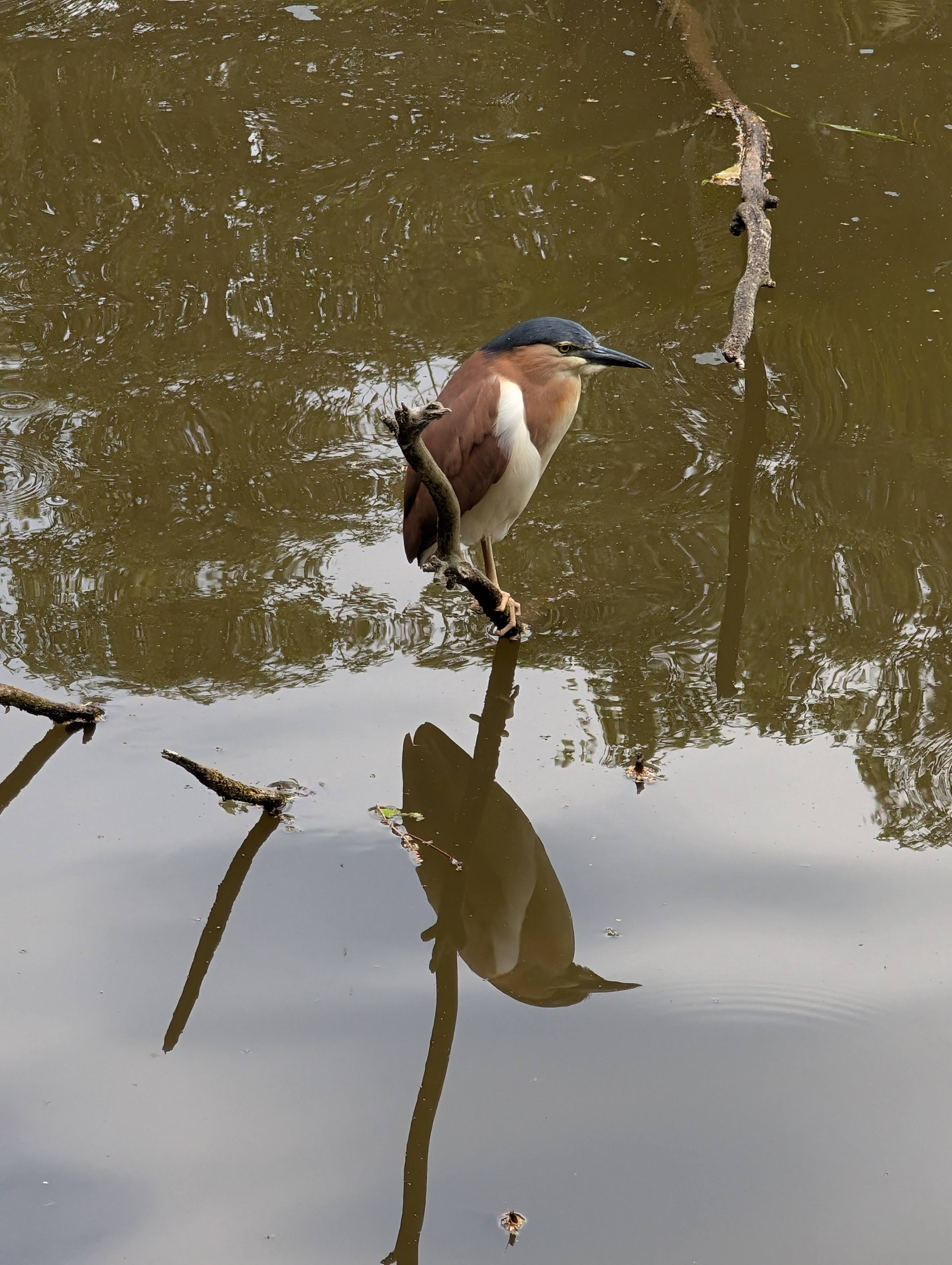
In Melbourne ZOO, Australia
