= Sengan-en =

Japanese garden in Kagoshima, Japan

- Sengan-en (仙巌園)
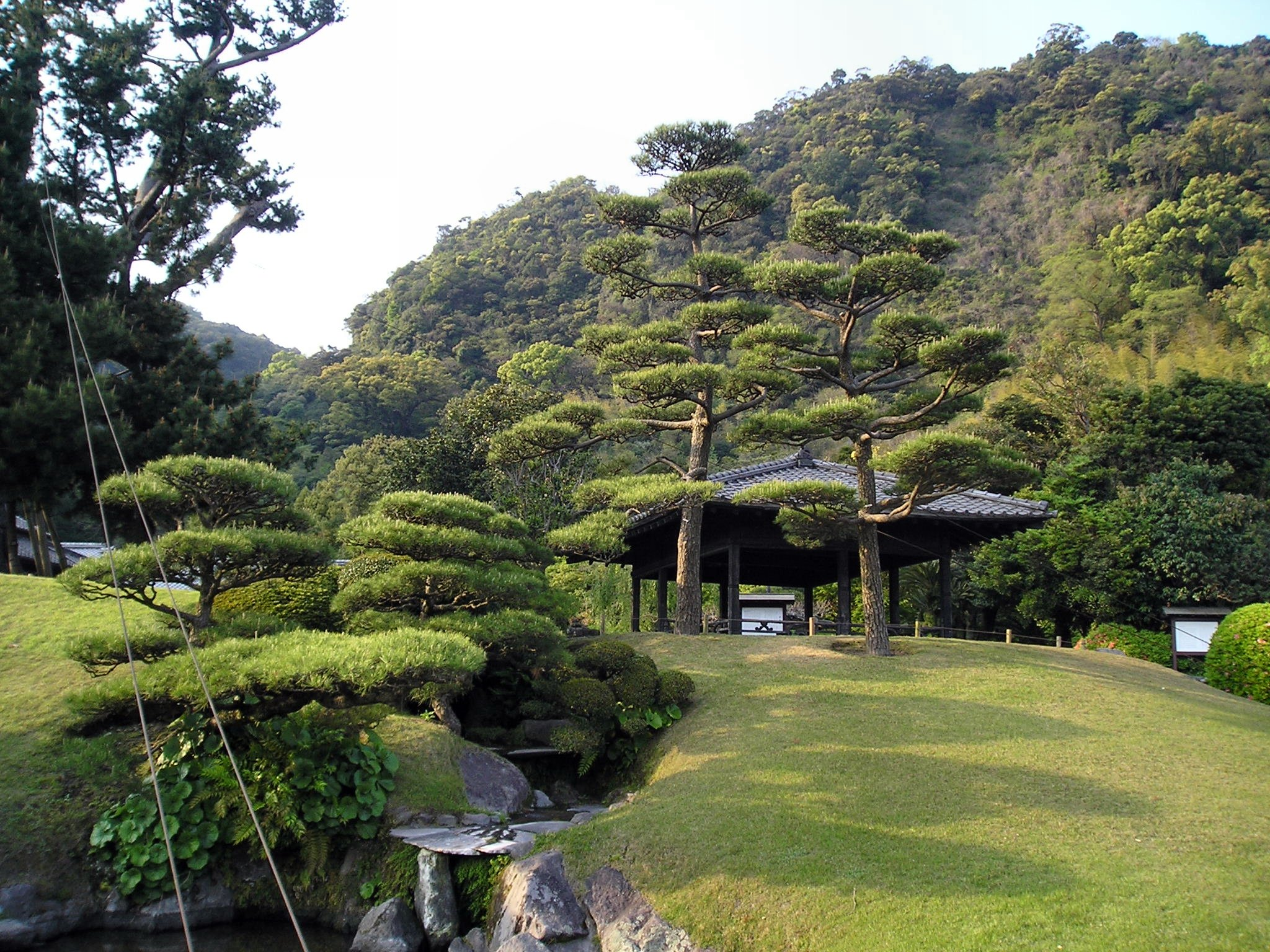
- Sengan-en in Kagoshima
- Interactive map of Sengan-en
- Type: Japanese garden
- Location: Kagoshima, Japan
- Coordinates: 31°37′06″N 130°34′46″E
- Created: 1658
- National Place of Scenic Beauty

Sengan-en (仙巌園) is a Japanese garden attached to a former Shimazu clan residence in Kagoshima, Kagoshima Prefecture, Japan. Designated a Place of Scenic Beauty, together with the adjacent Shōko Shūseikan it forms part of the UNESCO World Heritage Site Sites of Japan’s Meiji Industrial Revolution: Iron and Steel, Shipbuilding and Coal Mining. Sengan-en is managed by Shimadzu Ltd.

== History ==
The Sengan-en residence was built by Shimazu Mitsuhisa (島津光久) in 1658. The name is derived from a supposed resemblance to an eponymous feature on Long Hu Shan. In 1736 Shimazu Yoshitaka (島津吉貴) added a kyokusui (曲水) water feature and moso bamboo, obtained from China via the Ryūkyū Kingdom. During the Bakumatsu and Meiji periods, the residence housed visiting dignitaries including Katsu Kaishū, Willem Huyssen van Kattendijke, and Pompe van Meerdervoort in 1858, Harry Smith Parkes in 1866, Tsesarevich Nicholas Alexandrovich and Prince George of Greece in 1891, and the Duke of Connaught and Strathearn in 1906, and Edward VIII in 1922.

== Gardens ==
The gardens incorporate the view of Sakurajima across Kagoshima Bay as borrowed scenery.

== See also ==
- List of Places of Scenic Beauty of Japan (Kagoshima)
- List of World Heritage Sites in Japan
