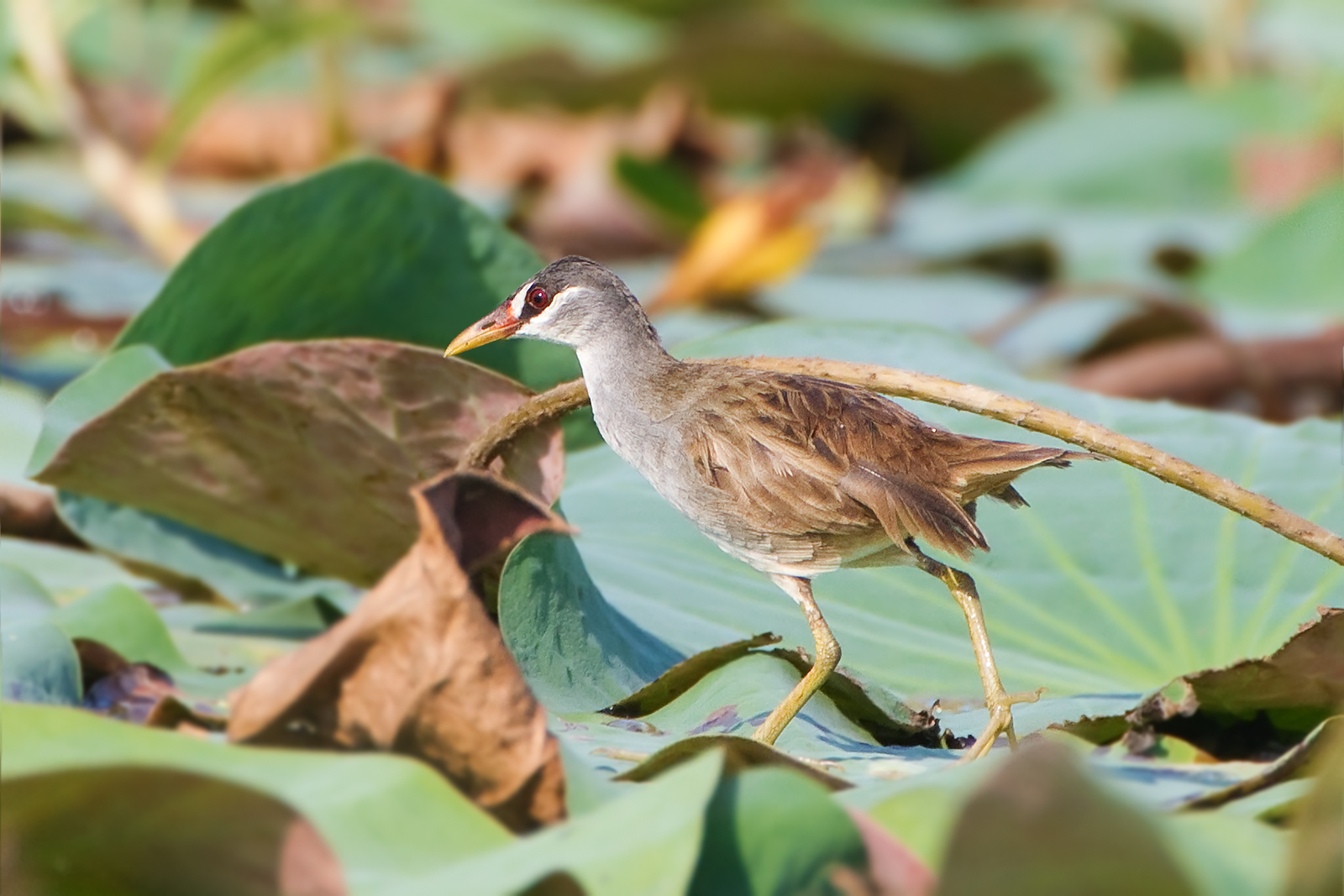

Conservation status
- Least Concern (IUCN 3.1)

Scientific classification
- Kingdom: Animalia
- Phylum: Chordata
- Class: Aves
- Order: Gruiformes
- Family: Rallidae
- Genus: Poliolimnas; Sharpe, 1893
- Species: P. cinereus

Binomial name
- Poliolimnas cinereus (Vieillot, 1819)

Synonyms
- Porzana cinerea Amaurornis cinerea Porphyrio cinereus

= White-browed crake =

Species of bird

The white-browed crake (Poliolimnas cinereus) is a species of bird in the family Rallidae. It is found in Australia, Brunei, Cambodia, Fiji, Hong Kong, Indonesia, Japan, India, Malaysia, Micronesia, New Caledonia, Palau, Papua New Guinea, the Philippines, Samoa, Singapore, Solomon Islands, Thailand, and Vanuatu.

Its natural habitat is subtropical or tropical mangrove forests. The Iwo Jima rail, a doubtfully valid subspecies formerly native to Iwo Jima, is now extinct.
