= Japanese Bantam =

Japanese breed of chicken

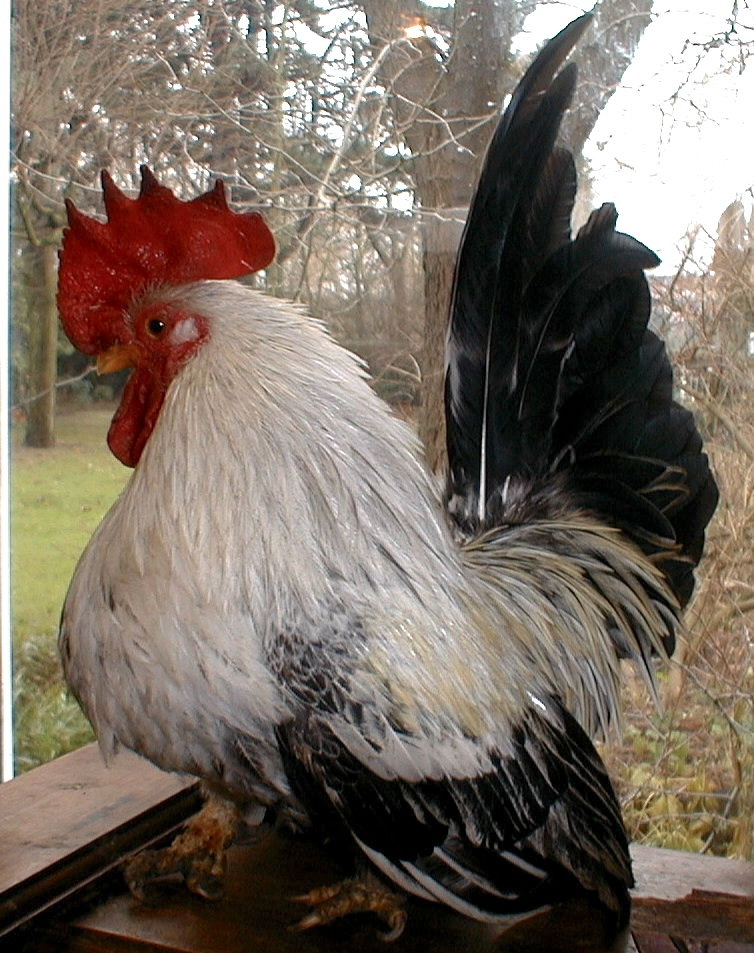
- Other names: Chabo; Shojo Chabo; Katsura Chabo
- Country of origin: Japan
- Distribution: South Asia
- Use: fancy

Traits
- Weight: Male: 510–620 g; Female: 400–510 g
- Skin colour: yellow
- Egg colour: cream or tinted
- Comb type: single

Classification
- APA: single comb clean-legged
- EE: yes
- PCGB: true bantam
- APS: true bantam softfeather light breed
- Chicken; Gallus gallus domesticus

The Japanese Bantam or Chabo (Japanese: 矮鶏) is a Japanese breed of ornamental chicken. It is a true bantam breed, meaning that it has no large fowl counterpart. It characterised by very short legs – the result of hereditary chondrodystrophy – and a large upright tail that reaches much higher than the head of the bird.

== History ==
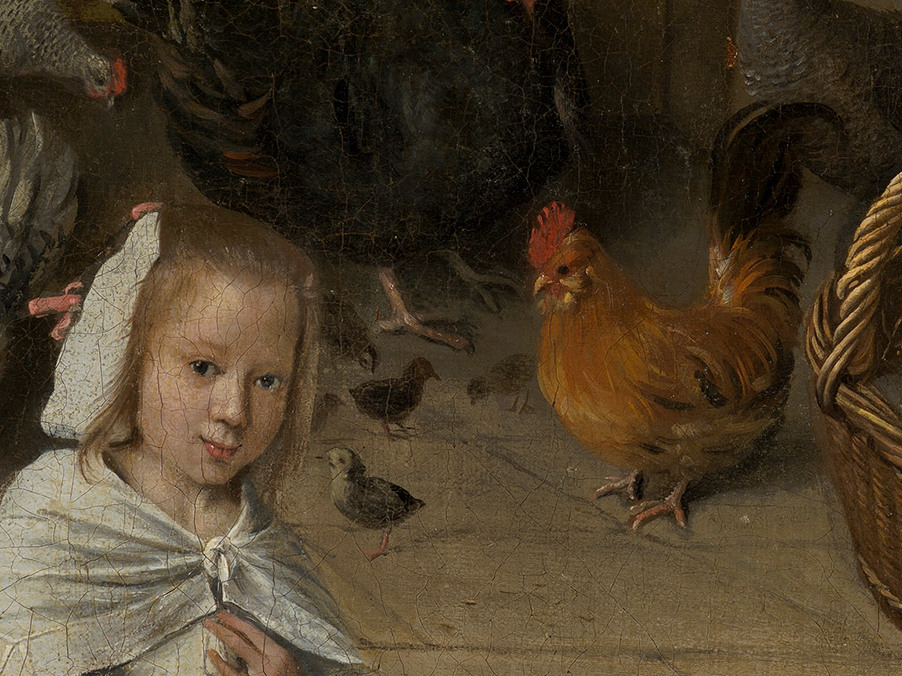
Detail of Portrait of Jacoba Maria van Wassenaer by Jan Steen, circa 1660, showing what is believed to be a Chabo

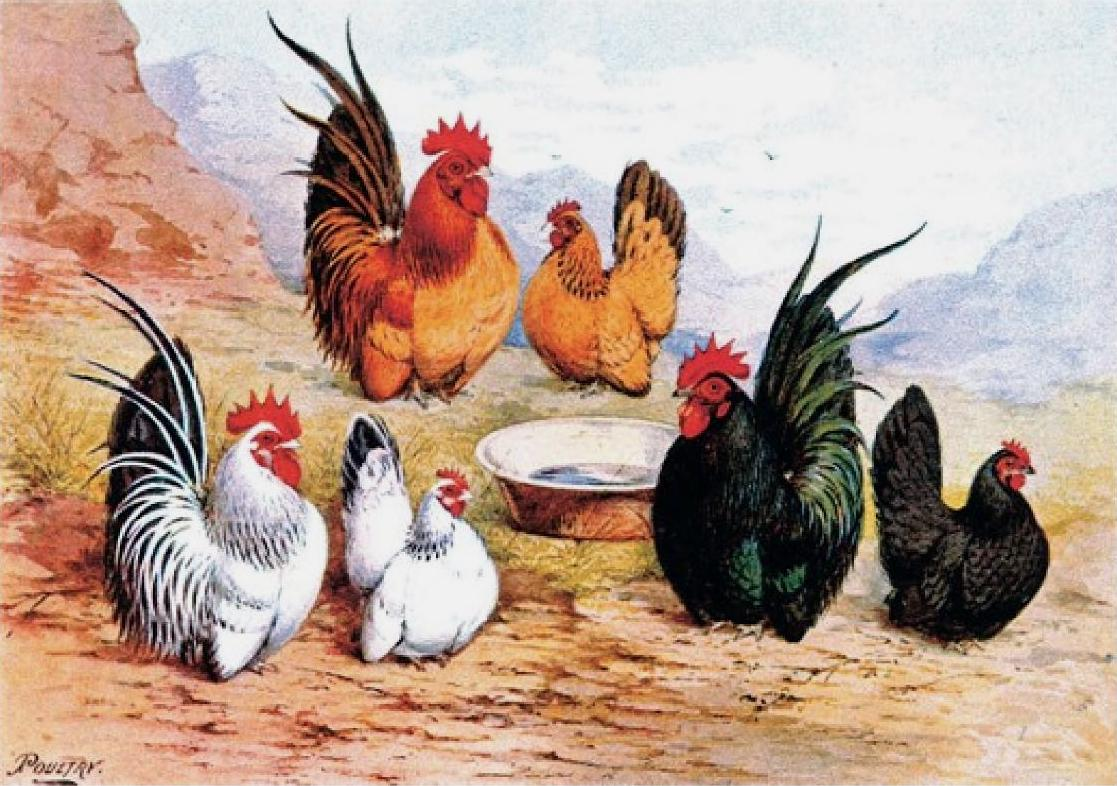
Illustration by J. W. Ludlow, circa 1912

The origin of the Chabo is unknown. Mitochondrial DNA evidence suggests that it, and all other Japanese breeds of ornamental chicken, derived through selective breeding from fighting chickens, the ancestors of the modern Shamo breeds. The earliest recognisable depiction of a Chabo in Japanese art dates from the beginning of the seventeenth century; a short-legged chicken with tall upright tail shown in the Portrait of Jacoba Maria van Wassenaer by Jan Steen, painted in about 1660, is believed to be a Chabo.

Japan was effectively closed to all foreign trade from 1636 until about the time of the Meiji Restoration in 1868. The first documented exports of the Chabo to Europe and the United States began at about this time. The Japanese Bantam apparently reached the United Kingdom in the 1860s; it was not included in the first British poultry standard of William Tegetmeier in 1865, but was described in his The Poultry Book in 1867. A breed society, the Japanese Bantam Club, was formed during the Crystal Palace Poultry Show of 1912.

In 1937 an international breed club – the International Chabo Bantam Club – was formed at a meeting in Switzerland.

== Characteristics ==
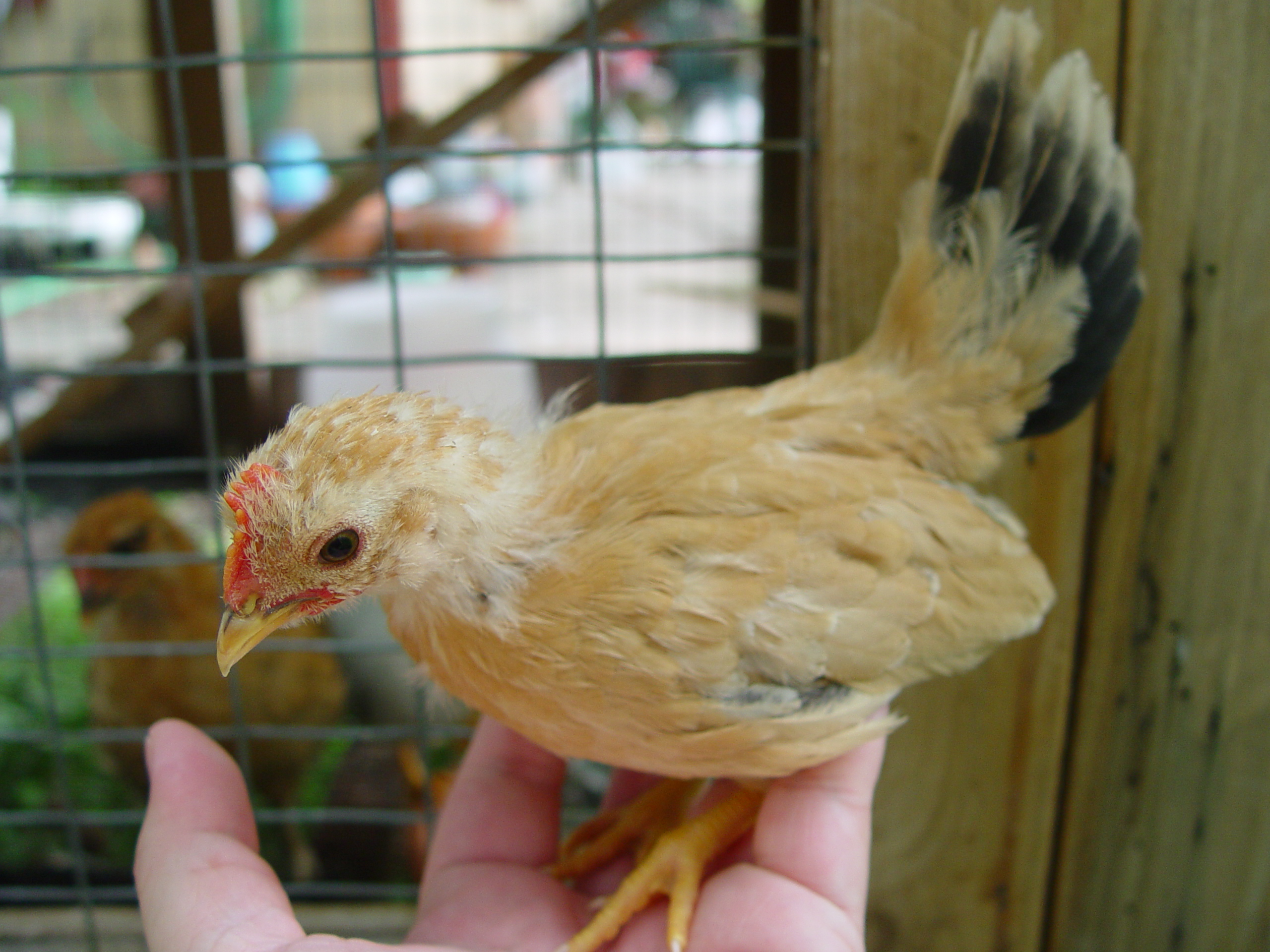
A young black-tailed buff cockerel

The Chabo has very short legs. This trait is caused by the creeper gene, Cp, which displays the standard behaviour of recessive lethal alleles: when short-legged birds are bred, 25% of the embryos are homozygous for the lethal allele, and die in shell; 50% are heterozygous, and develop into short-legged birds; the remaining 25% are homozygous for the non-lethal allele, and develop longer legs, making them unsuitable for showing. Long-legged birds bred to each other can not produce short-legged offspring.

In western countries there are many colour varieties of the Japanese Bantam. The Entente Européenne lists forty-two, of which twenty-three are recognised, with standardised colours including birchen grey, black, black mottled, black-tailed buff, black-tailed white, blue, blue mottled, blue-red, brown-red, buff Columbian, cuckoo, dark grey, golden duckwing, grey, lavender, Miller's grey, partridge, red, red mottled, silver-grey, tri-coloured, wheaten and white. The American Poultry Association lists nine colours. There are also frizzle-feathered, Silkie-feathered and hen-feathered variations, though not in all colours.

In Japan a number of types are recognised. These include the Okina Chabo, which is bearded; two varieties of Higo-Chabo, the Daruma and Taikan, both with an unusually large comb (the Taikan has a normal Chabo tail, while that of the Daruma is shorter and does not usually extend beyond the height of the head); and the Shinguro Chabo or black-skinned black, which is entirely black, with black face, comb, wattles, legs and feet.
