= List of places of scenic beauty of Japan (Kagoshima) =

This list is of the places of scenic beauty of Japan located within the Prefecture of Kagoshima.

== National Places of Scenic Beauty ==
As of 1 June 2019, five Places have been designated at a national level.

| Place | Municipality | Comments | Image | Coordinates | Type | Ref. |
|---|---|---|---|---|---|---|
| Former Shimazu Clan Tamazato Gardens 旧島津氏玉里邸庭園; Kyū-Shimazu-shi Tamazato-tei teien | Kagoshima | | | 31°36′43″N 130°32′19″E | 1 | |
| Shibushi Fumoto Gardens 志布志麓庭園; Shibushi Fumoto teien | Kagoshima | designation includes the Amamizu Family Gardens (天水氏庭園), Hirayama Family Gardens (平山氏庭園), and Fukuyama Family Gardens (福山氏庭園) | | 31°29′05″N 131°06′25″E | 1 | |
| Sengan-en 仙巌園附花倉御仮屋庭園; Sengan-en tsuketari Kekura Okariya teien | Kagoshima | | | 31°37′06″N 130°34′47″E | 1 | |
| Chiran Fumoto Gardens 知覧麓庭園; Chiran Fumoto teien | Minamikyūshū | near the Chiran Peace Museum for Kamikaze Pilots | | 31°22′46″N 130°26′54″E | 1 | |
| Bōnotsu 坊津; Bōnotsu | Minamisatsuma | | | 31°15′47″N 130°12′53″E | 8 | |

== Prefectural Places of Scenic Beauty ==
As of 14 August 2018, two Places have been designated at a prefectural level.

| Place | Municipality | Comments | Image | Coordinates | Type | Ref. |
|---|---|---|---|---|---|---|
| Sakurajima 桜島; Sakurajima | Kagoshima | | | 31°35′00″N 130°39′00″E | | |
| Ushinohama Coast 牛之浜海岸; Ushinohama-kaigan | Akune | | | 31°58′24″N 130°12′17″E | | |

== Municipal Places of Scenic Beauty ==
As of 1 May 2018, forty-two Places have been designated at a municipal level, including:

| Place | Municipality | Comments | Image | Coordinates | Type | Ref. |
|---|---|---|---|---|---|---|
| Jigen-ji Site 慈眼寺跡; Jigenji ato | Kagoshima | | | 31°30′37″N 130°29′54″E | | |
| Yaseo Falls 八瀬尾の滝; Yaseo-no-taki | Minamikyūshū | | | 31°25′12″N 130°28′01″E | | |

== Registered Places of Scenic Beauty ==
As of 1 June 2019, two Monuments have been registered (as opposed to designated) as Places of Scenic Beauty at a national level.

| Place | Municipality | Comments | Image | Coordinates | Type | Ref. |
|---|---|---|---|---|---|---|
| Kiyomizu Family Gardens 清水氏庭園; Kiyomizu-shi teien | Shibushi | | | 31°29′02″N 131°06′36″E | | |
| Torihama Family Gardens 鳥濱氏庭園; Torihama-shi teien | Shibushi | | | 31°29′04″N 131°06′24″E | | |

== See also ==
- Cultural Properties of Japan
- List of Historic Sites of Japan (Kagoshima)
- List of parks and gardens of Kagoshima Prefecture
