= Iwo Jima rail =

Scientific classification
- Kingdom: Animalia
- Phylum: Chordata
- Class: Aves
- Order: Gruiformes
- Family: Rallidae
- Genus: Poliolimnas
- Species: P. cinereus
- Subspecies: P. c. brevipes

Trinomial name
- Poliolimnas cinereus brevipes Ingram, 1911

Subspecies of bird

The Iwo Jima rail or white-browed crake (Poliolimnas cinereus brevipes) is an extinct subspecies of the white-browed crake native to the island of Iwo Jima. The last reported sightings were in 1924, and the subspecies is believed to be extinct.

== Description ==
The Iwo Jima rail was coloured dark brown, with black mottles on its back, and a white colouration on its belly. The bird was typically about six inches long.

== Ecology ==
The species Poliolimnas cinereus is typically found in both brackish water and fresh water marshes. Iwo Jima, however, lacked these features, and the Iwo Jima subspecies lived in the brush and tall grass along rivulets on the island, as well as damp places within the original forest cover.

== Extinction ==
When humans settled the island of Iwo Jima, they cleared away the existing forest to grow sugarcane. The forest clearance reduced the availability of fresh water, which forced the bird to come into the settlements to find water during the dry season. Here the birds often fell pray to cats. Combined with the introduction of rats to the island, this caused the extinction of the bird.

The last specimen of the bird was collected in 1911, and the last reported sightings were by T. T. Moniyama in 1924.
