= Ioki Cave =

Cave in Aki City, Japan

- 伊尾木洞
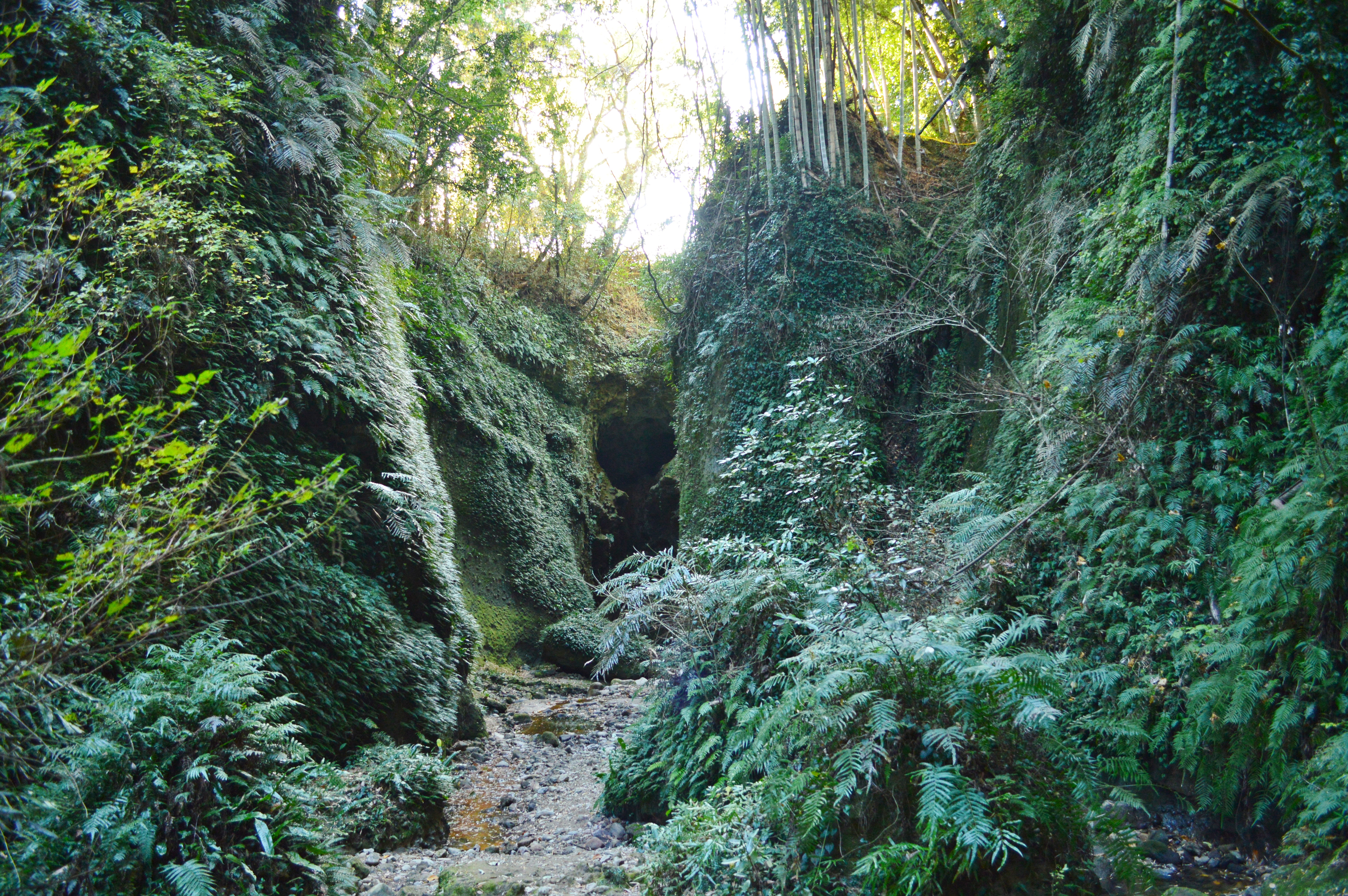

- Location within Kochi Prefecture
- Location: Aki City, Kōchi Prefecture
- Coordinates: 33.491472°N 133.933833°E
- Access: Public
- Natural Monument

Ioki Cave (伊尾木洞, Iokidō) is a cave located in Aki City, Kōchi Prefecture, Japan. The cave is known for its Ghibli-esque scenery.

== Location ==
Ioki Cave is located near ocean coast and Higashiyama Forest Park. The entrance to the cave is a 5-minute walk from Ioki Station on the Gomen Nahari Line.

== Overview ==
The cave, which is 40 meters long, and its canyon was formed by the erosion of ocean water 3 million years ago. Shell fossils can be found on the cave walls. A small river flows at the bottom of the canyon. There are tree waterfalls in the canyon and the largest one is located at the end of the trail. This waterfall forms a small blue-green pond. The fauna of the cave includes bats.

The temperature here remains around 20 °C all year, making it the perfect spot for tropical ferns to thrive. The entrance walls are covered with ferns of more than 40 species. The cave's diversity of the plant life was recognized as a National Natural Monument in 1915.

== Gallery ==
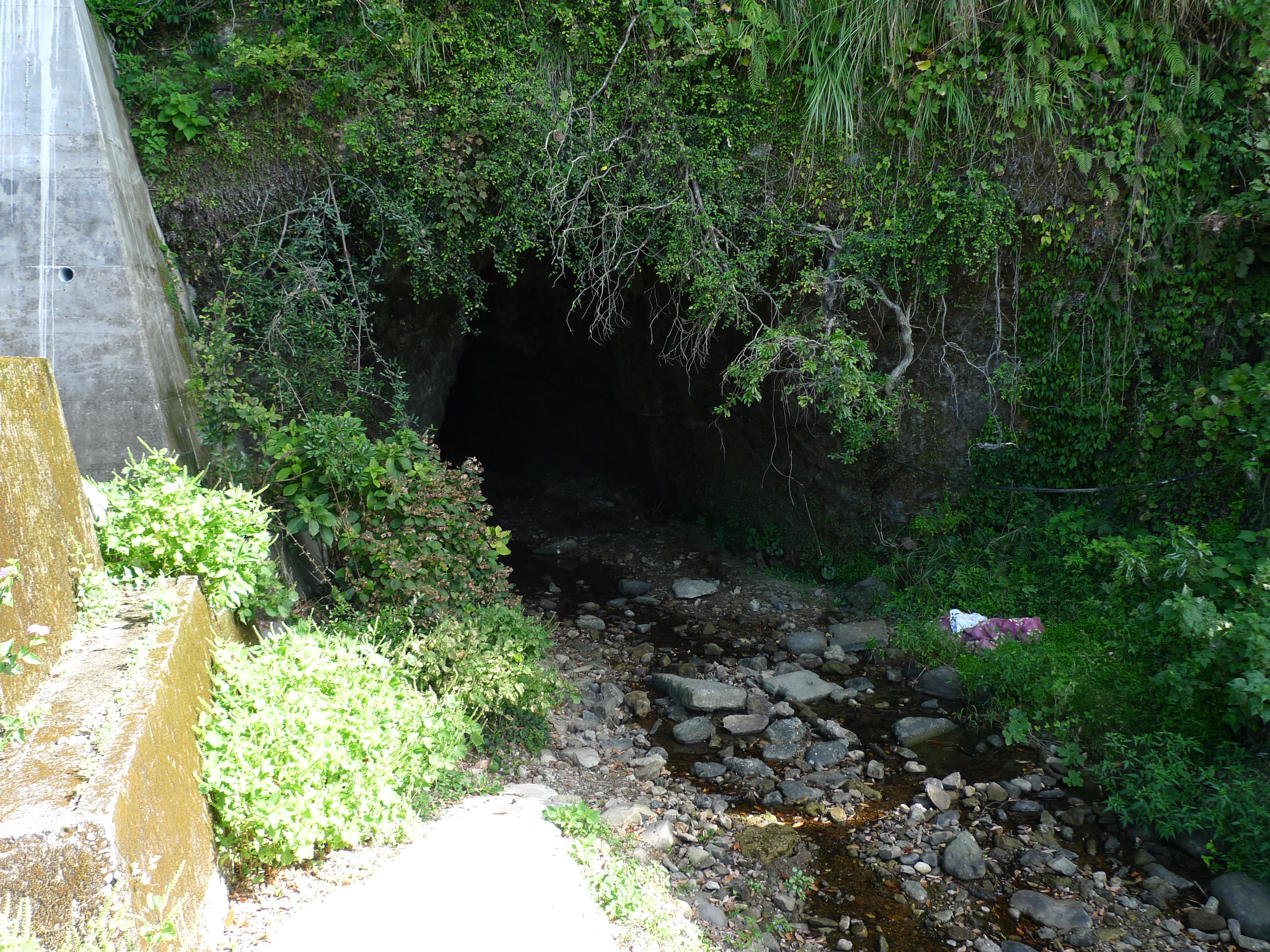
Entrance

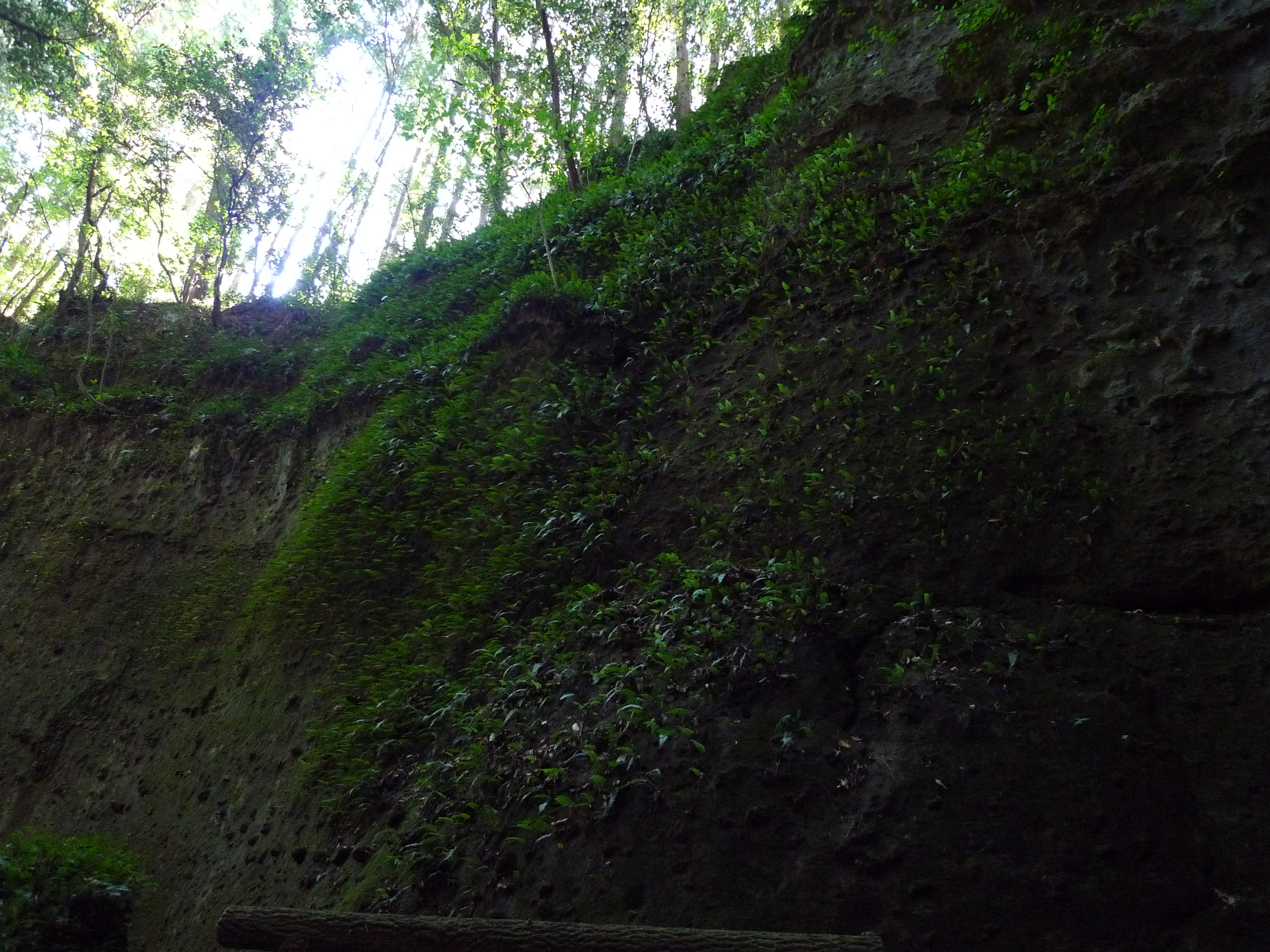
Ferns

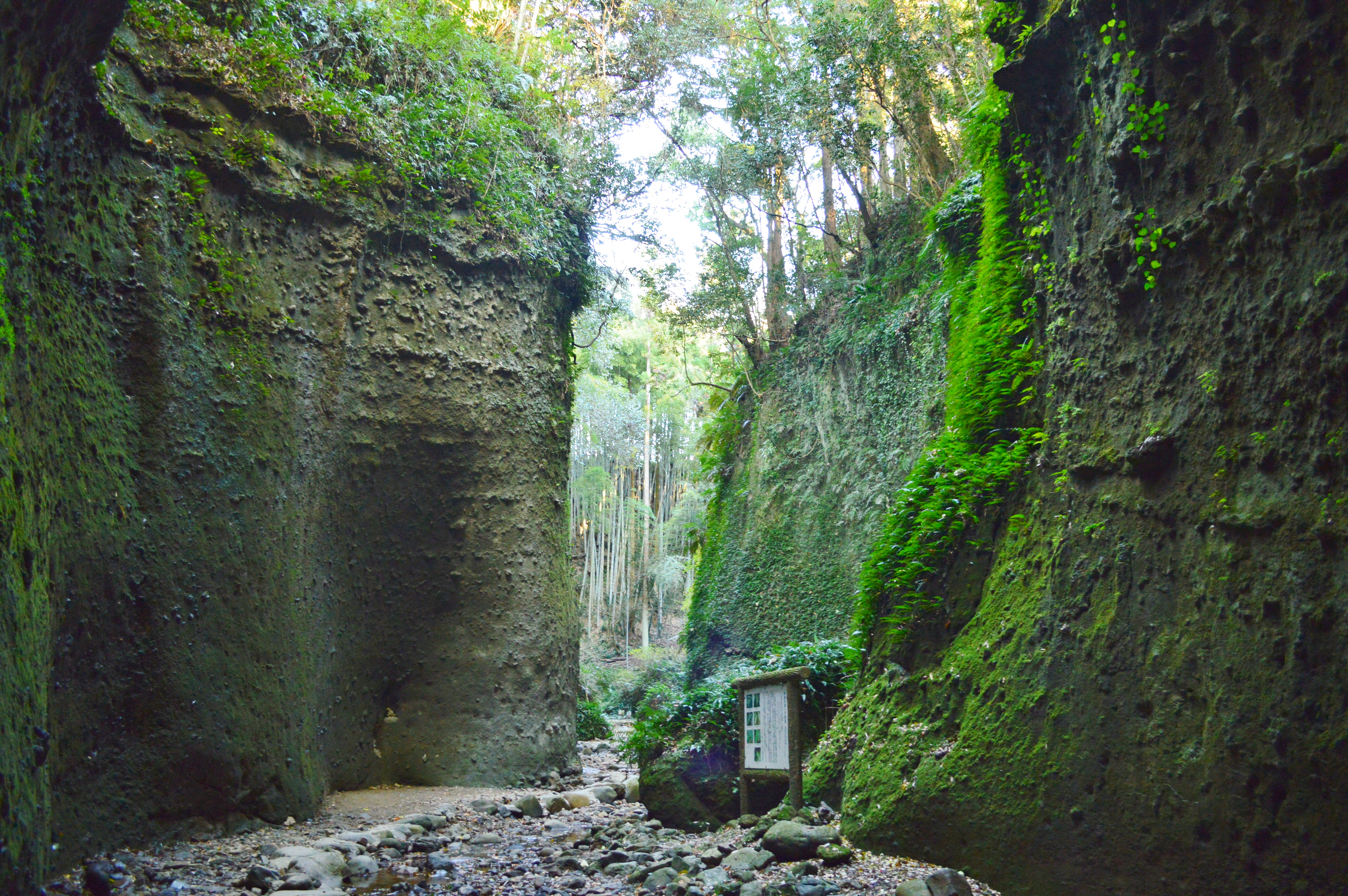
Canyon walls

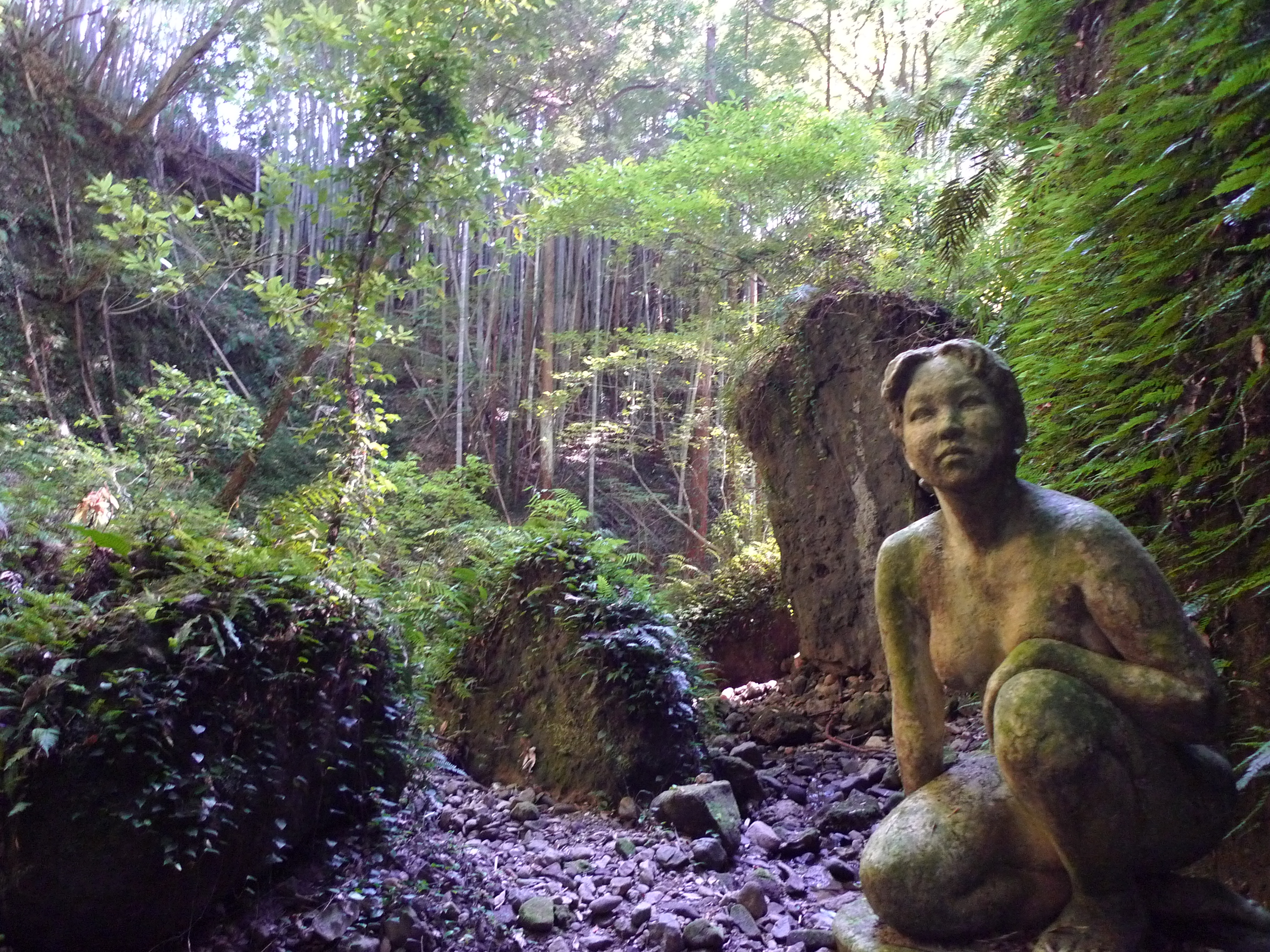
Statue in the cave

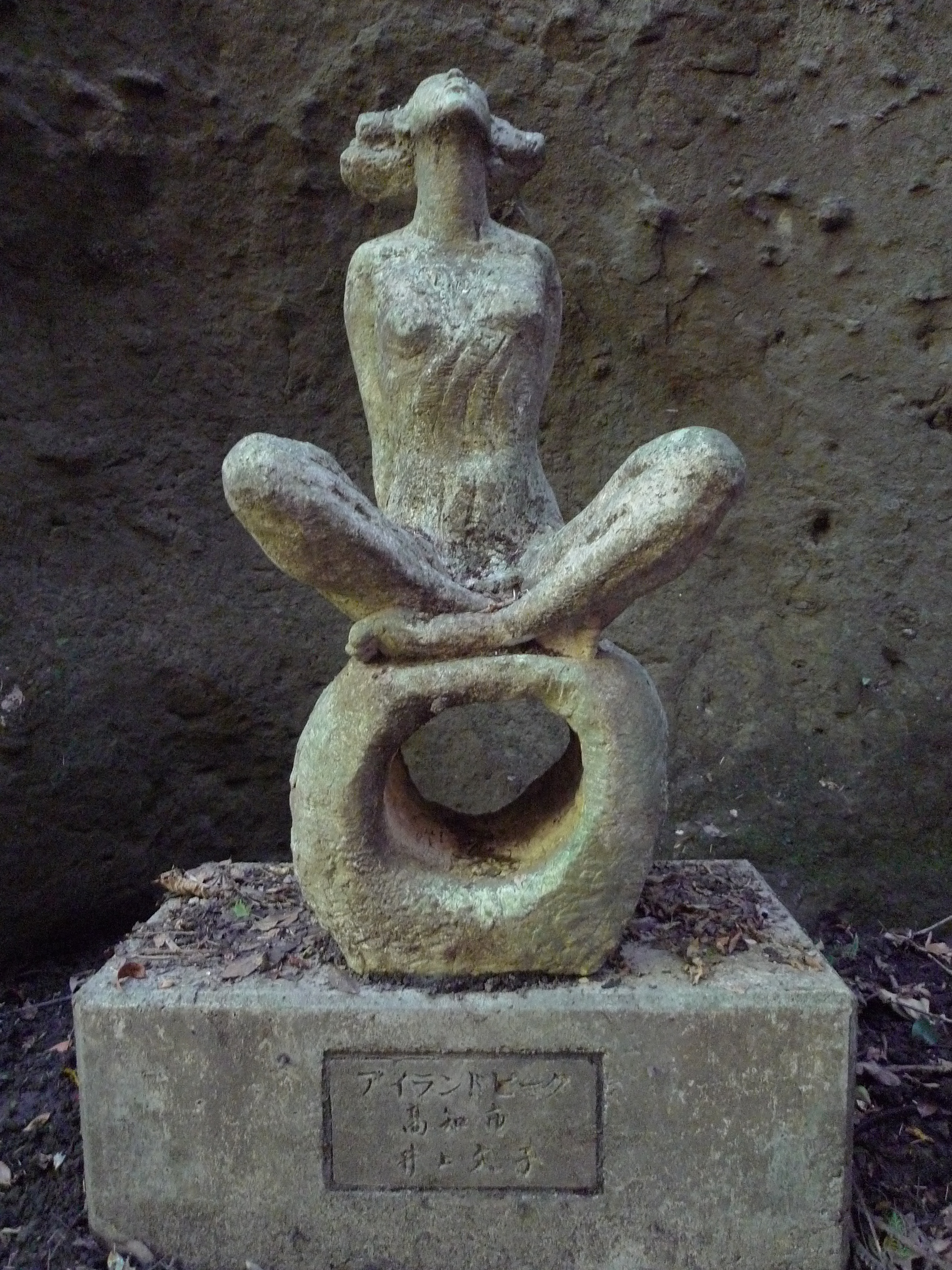
Statue in the cave
