= Extinct native Japanese horse breeds =

This is a list of extinct native Japanese horse breeds.

English name	Japanese name	Possible years of existence	Other info	References
Ushi	ウシウマ, Ushiuma	Until 1950	Existed in Tanegashima, Kagoshima.	
Kandachime	寒立馬, Kandachime	Until 1960 (as purebred)	Shimokita Peninsula. (Note: Other names: 野放馬, 尾駮の駒,糠部駿馬, 尻屋の野放馬, 田名部馬.) Horses living in the area today are not purebred.	
Nanbu	南部馬, Nanbu uma	Until 1940	Was bred with Kandachime. Nanbu was an early form of Dosanko.	
Miharu	三春駒 Miharukoma	At least 1930	Existed in Fukushima Prefecture. (Note: Other names: 三河馬) Population was already in decline in 1915. An article from 1927 mentioned that foreign breeds were imported into the country to improve local stock and as racehorses.	
Noto	能登馬, Notouma	At least 1920	Existed in Ishikawa Prefecture. (Note: Other names: 梅木馬、鈴の馬、高田馬)	
Tosa	土佐馬, Tosauma	At least 1920	Existed in Tosa Province.	
Hinata	日向馬, Hinatauma	Unknown	Mentioned only by name. (Note: Other names:日向の馬)	
Satsuma	薩摩馬, Satsumauma	Unknown	Mentioned only by name.	
Kai	甲斐駒, Kaikoma	Unknown	Mentioned only by name.	
Onikobe	鬼首馬, Onikobeuma	Unknown	Existed in Miyagi Prefecture. Mentioned only by name.	
Shimabara	島原馬, Shimabarauma	At least 1920	Existed in Nagasaki Prefecture. Potentially used as a war horse in the early 1900s.	
Pasture horse	馬の牧, Uma no maki	Unknown	Described in the Taihō Code.	
Awaji	淡路馬, Awajiuma	At least 1930.	Existed on Awaji Island.	
Aso	阿蘇馬, Asouma	Unknown	Existed in Kumamoto Prefecture. Mentioned only by name.	
Oki	隱岐馬, Okiuma	Until 1940	Existed in Oki, Shimane.	

== See also ==
- List of Japanese horse breeds
