= Satsumadori =

Japanese breed of fighting chicken

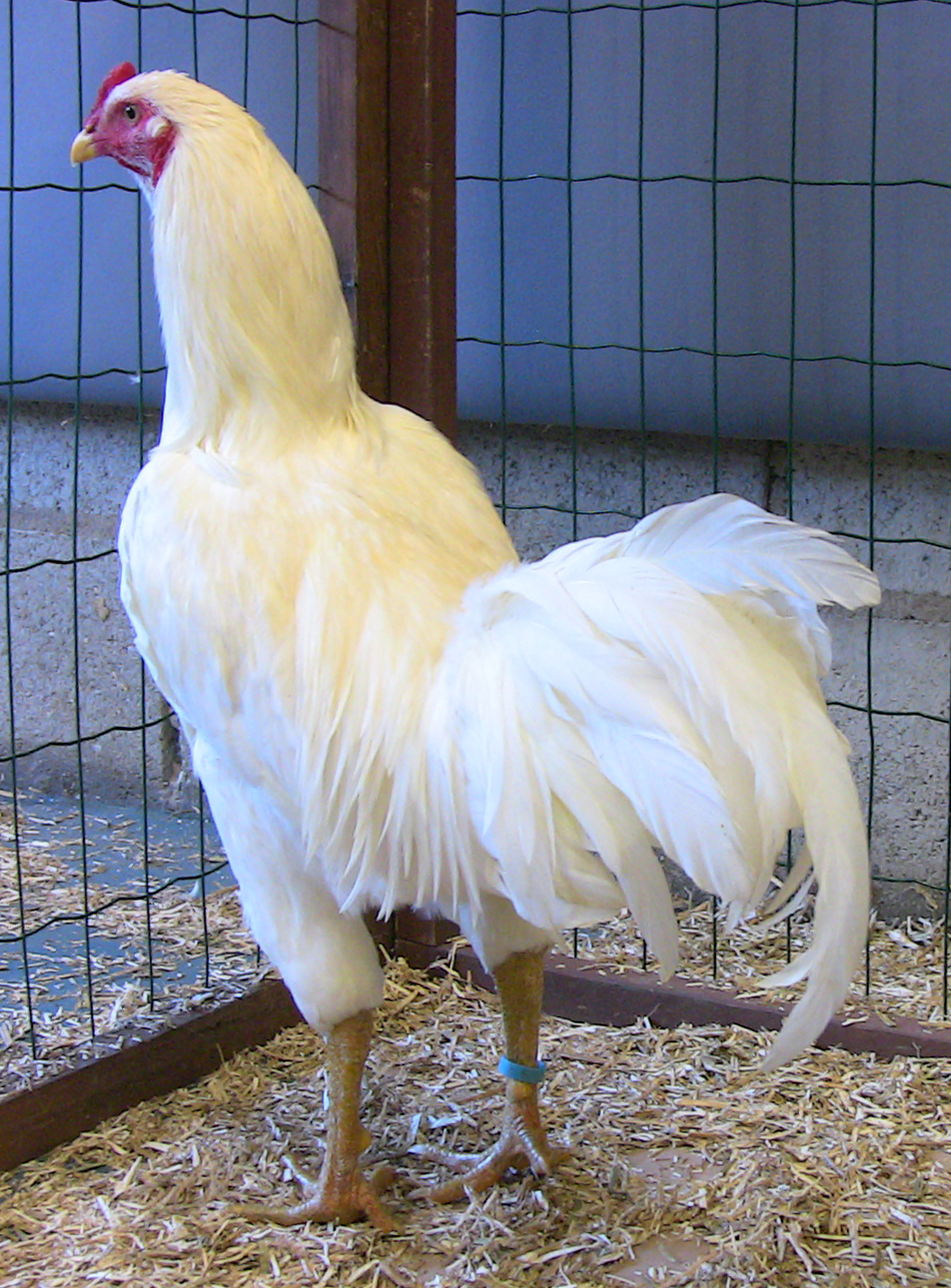
- Conservation status: not at risk
- Other names: Kagoshima Game; Satsuma-Dori
- Country of origin: Japan
- Use: Originally bred for cockfighting

Traits
- Weight: Male: 3.375 kg; Female: 2.625 kg
- Egg colour: White or tinted
- Comb type: triple in cocks

Classification
- APA: no
- EE: yes
- PCGB: yes
- Chicken; Gallus gallus domesticus

The Satsumadori is a Japanese breed of chicken. It originated in Kagoshima Prefecture, in the southernmost part of the island of Kyushu in southern Japan, and was originally bred for cockfighting. The name derives from that of the former province of Satsuma, now the western part of Kagoshima Prefecture.

== History ==
The Satsumadori originated in Kagoshima Prefecture, in the southernmost part of the island of Kyushu in southern Japan, and was originally bred for cockfighting with steel spurs. It was designated a Natural Monument of Japan in 1943, one of seventeen breeds which have this status. In 1999 the total number of breeding stock was 305 birds; the conservation status was assessed as "not at risk".

== Characteristics ==
The Satsumadori is bred in many colour variants. The traditional Japanese colours are: akasasa, roughly "red-hackled"; kinsasa, "golden-hackled"; kisasa, "yellow-hackled"; shirosasa, "white-hackled"; soukoku, black; and taihaku, white. In the United Kingdom it may be white, silver duckwing, gold duckwing, black or black-red; the first three of these are recognised by the Entente Européenne, while the last is not listed.

Standard weights are 3.375 kg (7.4 lb) for cock birds and 2.625 kg (5.8 lb) for hens. The comb is triple in cocks, and small or non-existent in hens. Comb, face, ear-lobes and wattles are vivid red, and the eyes are gold or silver; wattles and ear-lobes may be small or entirely absent. The beak and legs are yellow, but may be darker in the black variant. Cock birds have an upright stance; the tail fans out laterally, and is held above the horizontal.

== Use ==
The Satsumadori was bred as a game bird for steel-spur cock-fighting, in which blades were attached to the legs in the area of the spur. This type of cock-fighting is no longer legal in Japan. The Satsumadori is kept for fancy.
