= Chondrodystrophy =

- Specialty: Medical genetics

Chondrodystrophy (literally, "cartilage maldevelopment") refers to a skeletal disorder caused by one of myriad genetic mutations that can affect the development of cartilage. As a very general term, it is used in the medical literature only when a more precise description of the condition is unavailable.

== Presentation ==
People with chondrodystrophy have a normal-sized trunk and abnormally short limbs and extremities (dwarfism). Those affected with the disorder often call themselves dwarves, little people or short-statured persons. Over 100 specific skeletal dysplasias have been identified. Chondrodystrophy is found in all races and in both females and males and occurs in around one of every 25,000 children. Chondrodystrophy and achondroplasia are the most common forms of genetic hyaline disorders.

Hyaline cartilage caps the long bones and the spinal vertebrae. Most childhood limb growth takes place at the ends of the long bones, not in the shaft. Normally, as a child grows, the most interior portion of the joint cartilage converts into bone, and new cartilage forms on the surface to maintain smooth joints. The old joint margins (edges) reabsorb, so that the overall shape of the joint is maintained as growth continues. Failure of this process throughout the body results in skeletal dysplasia. It also leads to very early onset of osteoarthritis, because the defective cartilage is extremely fragile and vulnerable to normal wear and tear.

== Causes ==
It is thought that chondrodystrophy is caused by an autosomal, recessive allele. To avoid a potential "lethal dose", both parents can be genetically tested. If a child is conceived with another carrier the outcome may be lethal, or the child may suffer from chondrodystrophy or dwarfism. This means that even though both parents are completely normal in height, the child will have one of the two types of skeletal dysplasia. Type 1 (short limb dysplasia), the more common of the two, is characterised by a long trunk and extremely shortened extremities. Type 2, short-trunk dysplasia, is characterised by a shortened trunk and normal size extremities. Those affected by chondrodystrophy may also experience metabolic and hormonal disorders, both of which may be monitored and controlled by hormonal injections.

Animals have been bred specifically to elicit chondrodystrophic traits for research purposes and to more easily allow animals to free-roam without escaping by, for example, jumping over ranch fences. One example of this is the Ancon sheep, which was first bred from a lamb born in 1791 with naturally occurring chondrodystrophy.

=== Inheritance ===
Chondrodystrophy has an autosomal recessive pattern of inheritance.

Chondrodystrophy is an autosomal recessive disorder, meaning that in order for this disease to be expressed, the affected individual must possess two copies of the allele for the disorder. The inheritance of the chondrodystrophy gene is as follows:

Let us name the dominant allele for normal stature "T", and the recessive allele coding for chondrodystrophy "t". Either one or the other is going to be chosen during random selection for a particular "seat" on its chromosome. If both parents are heterozygous for chondrodystrophy, they each possess one copy of the T allele and one copy of the t allele (each person has two copies of every autosomal allele, a paternal and a maternal one). When they reproduce there are then four possible alleles that may be chosen at random, two of them are the T allele (one from the father, one from the mother), and two are t alleles (again, one from the father, and one from the mother). The resulting Mendelian ratio of offspring from this mating would then be:

- 1 homozygous dominant, or TT
- 2 heterozygous, or Tt
- 1 homozygous recessive, or tt

The phenotypes of the offspring would be three unaffected, normal-stature offspring, and one affected chondrodystrophic offspring; there would be a 25% chance of having an affected offspring if both parents were carriers of the recessive allele. Other probabilities for the other possible allele combinations concerning this gene are: 0% chance of affected offspring if only one parent is a carrier, 0% chance of affected offspring if one parent is affected and the other does not carry the allele, and 50% chance of affected offspring if one parent is affected and the other is a carrier. These ratios may be found by drawing up a standard Mendelian punnett square.

=== Percentage risk of inheritance ===
- Both average parents
  1. A couple already has a child with chondrodystrophy; the risk of inheritance for the next child to have the disorder is 0.1% (less than 1 in 1,000)
  2. The risk that the normal-statured child will have at least one offspring with this disorder is 0.01% (less than 1 in 10,000)
- One parent with chondrodystrophy and one parent without
  1. One child with normal height; the probability of that child having offspring with chondrodystrophy is 0.01% (less than 1 in 10,000)
  2. One child with normal stature; the probability of the next having chondrodystrophy is 50% (1 in 2)
  3. One child with normal stature; the probability of the next not having chondrodystrophy is 50% (1 in 2)
- Both parents with chondrodystrophy
  1. The probability of offspring affected by chondrodystrophy is 100% (4 in 4)
  2. The probability of offspring to be of normal size is 0% (0 in 4)

== Diagnosis ==
There are several ways to determine if a child has chondrodystrophy, including parent testing and x-rays. If the fetus is suspected of having chondrodystrophy, the parents can be tested to find out if the fetus in fact does have the disease. It is not until the baby is born that a diagnosis can be declared. The diagnosis is declared with the help of several x-rays and charted bone growth patterns. Once the child is diagnosed the parents have to monitor the children because of several different factors. As the child gets older, hearing, eyesight and motor skills may be defective. Also, breathing (apnea) and weight problems (obesity) may occur. Structurally, scoliosis, bowed legs (genu varum), and arthritis may result.

== Treatment ==
There is no treatment at this time to promote bone growth in chondrodystrophy patients. Certain types of growth hormone seem to increase the rate of growth during the first year of life/treatment, but have no substantial effect in adult patients. Only a few surgical centers in the world perform, experimentally, leg and arm lengthening procedures. Most common therapies are found in seeking help from: family physicians, pediatrics, internists, endocrinologists, geneticists, orthopedists and neurologists.

=== Coping with chondrodystrophy ===
It is important that the individual experience independence and self-worth. There are several appliances available to help overcome the disadvantages of small stature, including light-switch extenders and longer pedals in cars to enable effective driving. Several organizations that help Little People interact and get involved, such as the Little People of America.

==== Physical education and sports ====
Having short limbs can limit ball handling, and athletic performance in racquet sports and certain track events, like the long jump and high jump. However, short limbs can be an advantage for a sport like power lifting. Additionally, swimming and bicycling are recommended due to their limited impact on the joints.

==== Modification suggestions ====
- Height adjustments for goals and volleyball nets.
- Modified rules to accommodate size and structure.
- Modified equipment, such as smaller balls and/or racquets.
- Lowered swings to allow a feeling of independence on the playground.

==== The Dwarf Athletic Association of America ====
The Dwarf Athletic Association was started in 1985 for little people. Common sports are basketball, volleyball, powerlifting, track, field, swimming and bowling. National events are held along with the annual conference of Little People of America. The games accommodate athletes who are 4'10" or less with chondrodystrophy or related disorders. Athletes who meet the above requirements may compete in the Paralympic Games and other events sponsored by the International Paralympic Committee.

== See also ==
- Chondrodysplasia
