= Takamen =

Takamen (Japanese: タカメン) is a supernatural deity with a strange appearance that appears during the traditional Saku-odori or Toyomatsuri-odori festivals held from the 1st to the 2nd day of the 8th month of the lunar calendar on Takeshima Island (part of Mishima Village, Kagoshima District, Kagoshima Prefecture) in the Satsunan Islands of Kyushu, Japan.

== Overview ==
Takamen is a costumed figure representing a deity, which appears during annual rituals such as the Saku-odori performed on Takeshima Island, part of the Satsunan Islands in Kagoshima Prefecture. It is featured as part of religious ceremonies aimed at ensuring good harvests, protection from illness, and the warding off of evil.

The mask of the Takamen is conical in shape and over one meter tall, adorned with large ear-like decorations and vibrantly decorated using kirigami (cut paper). It is characterized by slanted eyes and jagged ornamental patterns. Smaller accompanying masks that follow the Takamen are called Kazuramen.

During the ritual, the Takamen dances in rhythm with gongs and drums played by villagers, walking around while gently striking them with a bundle of brushwood (shiba). This act is believed to cleanse evil spirits and bring prosperity to the community.

== Etymology ==
There are various theories regarding the origin of the name "Takamen." One suggests that it derives from the tall, pointed shape of the mask. Another posits that the name refers to the mask being modeled after a hawk (taka in Japanese).
