= Denshima =

Island in Kagoshima, Japan

Coordinates: 30°45′02″N 130°06′07″E

Den-shima
Native name: デン島, Denshima
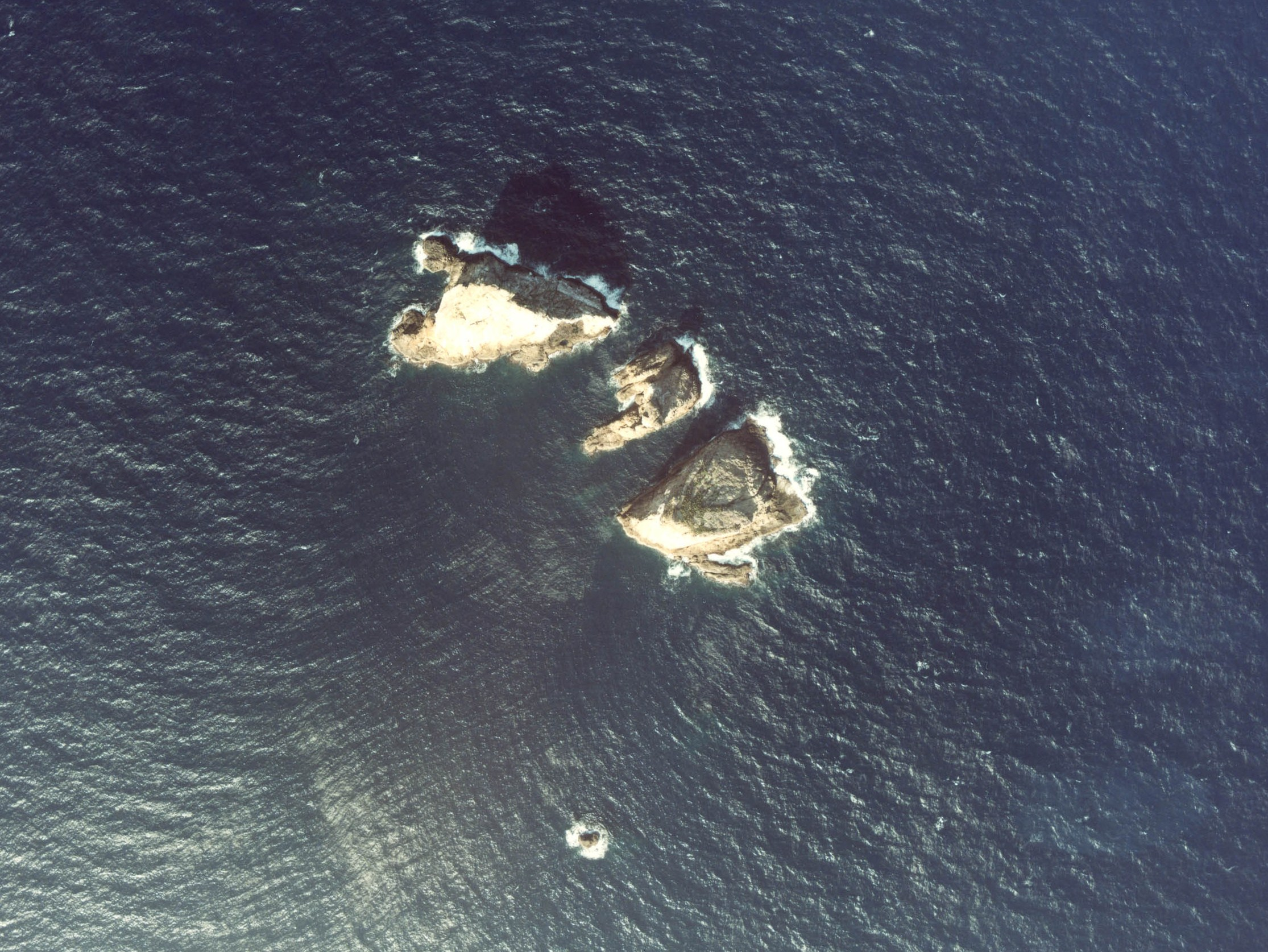
- Aerial view of the island. (1978)

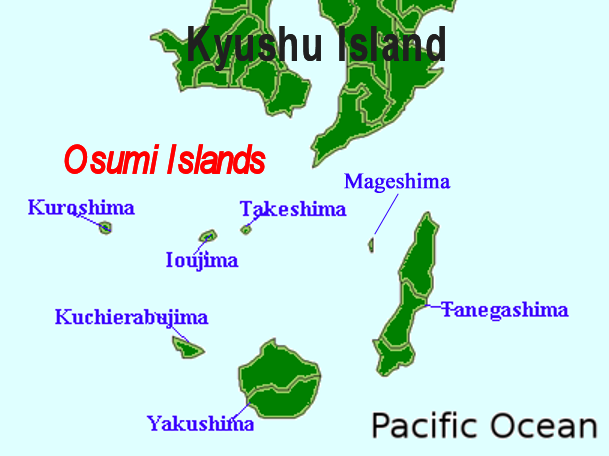

Geography
- Location: East China Sea
- Archipelago: Ōsumi Islands
- Highest elevation: 58 m (190 ft)

Administration
- Japan
- Prefectures: Kagoshima Prefecture
- District: Kagoshima District
- Village: Mishima

Demographics
- Population: uninhabited -

Denshima (デン島), also known as Yuze (湯瀬), is an uninhabited volcanic pillar located in the Ōsumi Islands and belonging to Kagoshima Prefecture, Japan.

== Geography ==
Denshima is located roughly equidistant between Iōjima and Kuroshima. The island is an exposed and highly eroded portion of lava dome associated with the submarine Kikai Caldera, a stratovolcano rising from the ocean floor. It consists of three large rocks, separated by very narrow channels, with a maximum height of 58 metres (190 ft) above sea level, and a smaller rock, just breaching the ocean surface, to one side.

== See also ==
- Desert island
- List of islands
