= Iōjima (Kagoshima) =

Island within the Satsunan Islands

Native name: 硫黄島
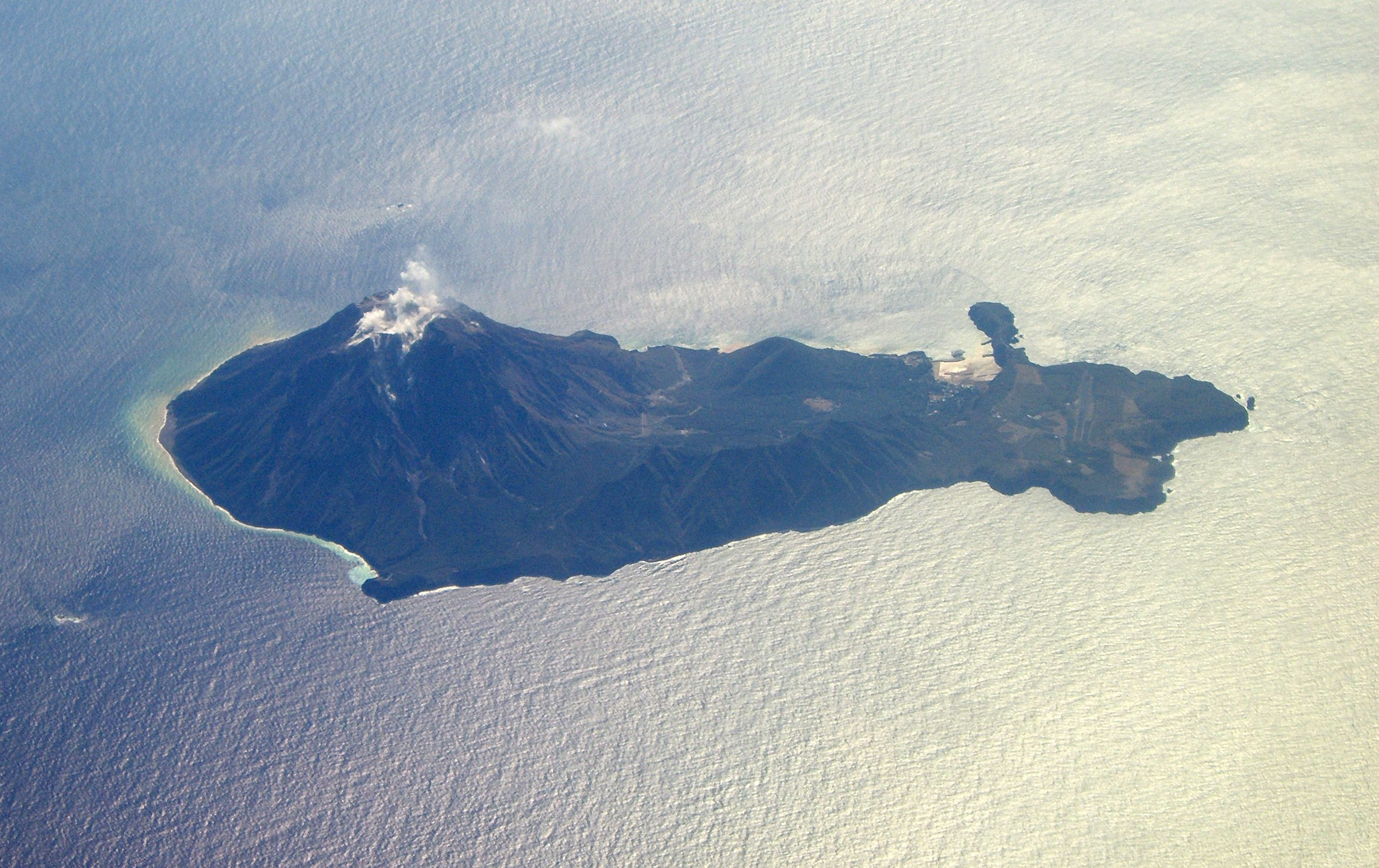
- Aerial view of the island (February 2008)

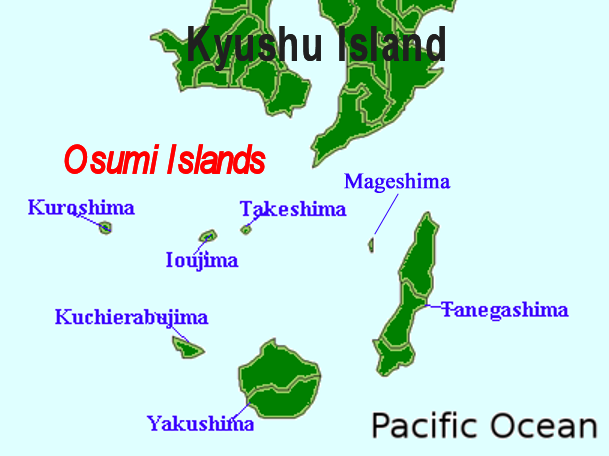

Geography
- Location: East China Sea
- Coordinates: 30°47′27″N 130°17′46″E
- Archipelago: Ōsumi Islands
- Area: 11.65 km^{2} (4.50 sq mi)
- Length: 5.5 km (3.42 mi)
- Width: 4.0 km (2.49 mi)
- Coastline: 14.5 km (9.01 mi)
- Highest elevation: 703.7 m (2308.7 ft)
- Highest point: Iōdake

Administration
- Japan
- Prefectures: Kagoshima Prefecture
- District: Kagoshima District
- Village: Mishima

Demographics
- Population: 121 (December 1, 2006)
- Pop. density: 10.38/km^{2} (26.88/sq mi)

Iōjima (Japanese: 硫黄島; [i.oː.(d)ʑi.ma]), also known as Satsuma Iōjima (薩摩硫黄島), Satsuma-Iwo Jima or Tokara Iōjima (吐噶喇硫黄島), is one of the Satsunan Islands, usually classed with the Ōsumi Islands, belonging to Kagoshima Prefecture, Japan. Along with Takeshima and Kuroshima, it makes up the three-island village of Mishima, Kagoshima Prefecture, Japan. The island, 11.65 km^{2} in area, has a population of 142.

== Geography ==
Iōjima is one of the Ōsumi islands, and is located 110 kilometres (59 nmi) south of Kagoshima. The island has an area of approximately 11.65 square kilometres (4.50 sq mi) with a length of 5.5 kilometres (3.4 mi) in length from east to west and 4.0 kilometres (2.5 mi) from north to south.

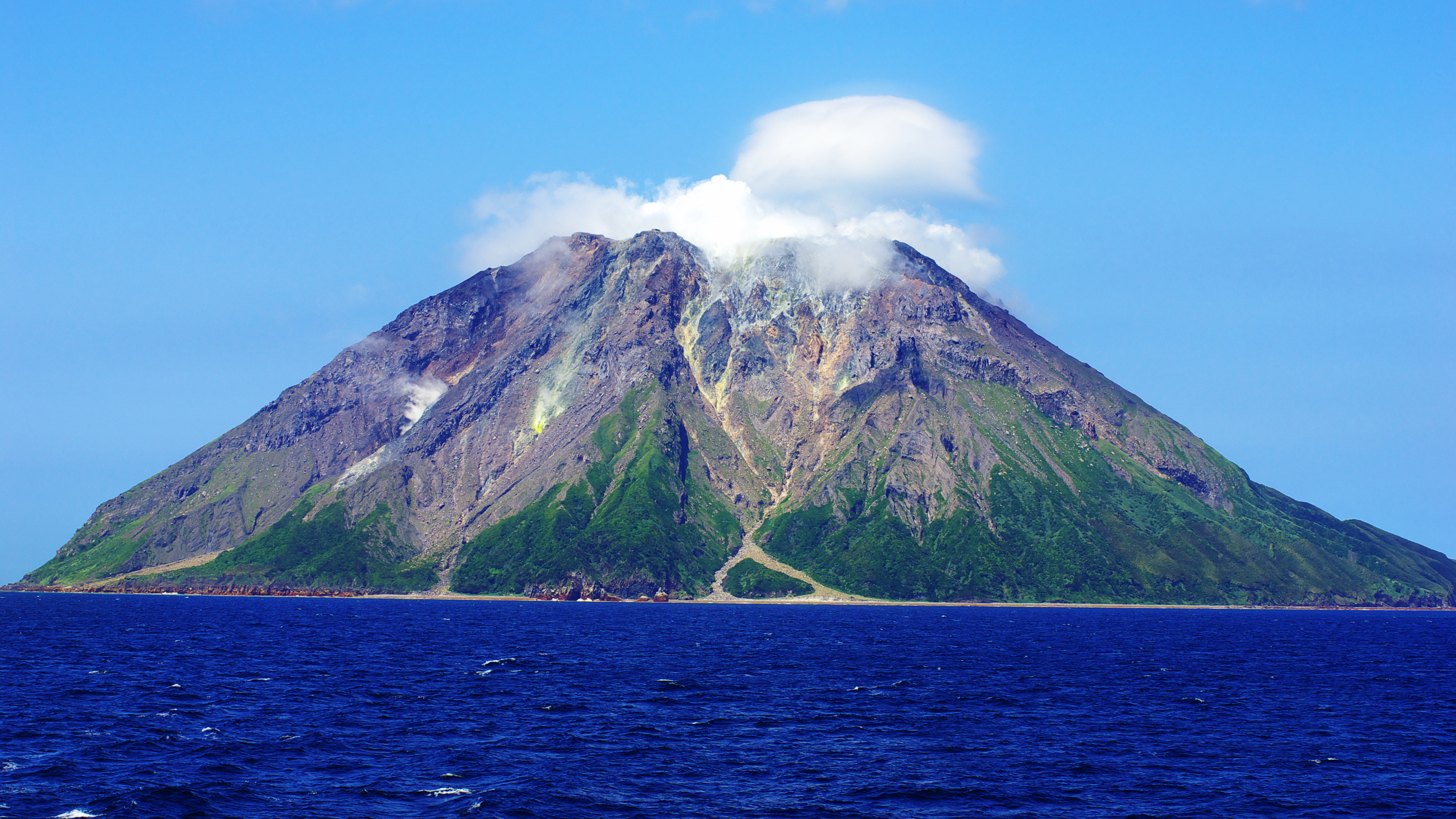
Mount Iōdake (May 2015). Taken from the east.

Iōjima is of volcanic origin, and is the northern edge of the Kikai Caldera, a stratovolcano rising from the ocean floor to 703.7 metres (2,309 ft) above sea level at its highest peak (Mount Iōdake). Kikai Caldera is ranked class A for volcanic activity. It is constantly erupting, emitting massive amounts of sulfur dioxide which causes damage to agricultural products. Hot springs high in iron concentration from the port bottom gush and due to contact with oxygen, the port waters change to a reddish-brown color. Due to the sulfur, the sea area around the island is yellow in color. This gave rise to the name "Sulfur Island" (Iōjima).

The climate of Iōjima is classified as subtropical, with a rainy season from May through September.

Shōwa Iōjima, a small uninhabited island, is located just offshore to the north.

== History ==
Historically Iōjima is one of the islands identified as Kikai Island, an island of exile mentioned in the Heike Monogatari, where the conspirator Shunkan was exiled. However, there are other islands in the Ryukyu Islands which also make the same claim.

During the Edo period, Iōjima was part of Satsuma Domain and was administered as part of Kawabe District. In 1896, the island was transferred to the administrative control of Ōshima District, Kagoshima, and from 1911 was part of the village of Toshima, Kagoshima. From 1946-1952, the southern seven islands in the Toshima group belonging to the Tokara archipelago came under the administration of the United States as part of the Provisional Government of Northern Ryukyu Islands; however, since Iōjima is located north of 30 degrees North, it remained Japanese territory during this time, and came under the administration of the village of Mishima in Kagoshima Prefecture.

== Transportation ==
The island can be reached by bi-weekly ferry service to the city of Kagoshima on the mainland. Travel time is about 3 hours. Satsuma Iōjima Airport was opened in 1973 in conjunction with a resort development by the Yamaha Corporation. Ownership of the airport was transferred to Mishima Village after the resort closed in 1994, but there is no scheduled service.

== Economy ==
From the Meiji period, mining of sulfur and silica were important to the local economy. However, the mine closed in 1964 due to increased volcanic activity and a large drop in prices due to cheaper imports. The population of the island, which reached 604 people in 1960, dropped to 186 by 1970 due to the mine closure. In October 1973, the Yamaha Corporation established a resort complex on the island, but the venture went bankrupt in April 1983. Peacocks brought in as decoration for the hotel have become feral, and can be found throughout the island. The present economic basis of the island is now mainly fishing, agriculture (beef cattle, bamboo shoots, camellia oil products) and seasonal tourism.
