= Toshima, Kagoshima =

Toshima 十島村
- Village
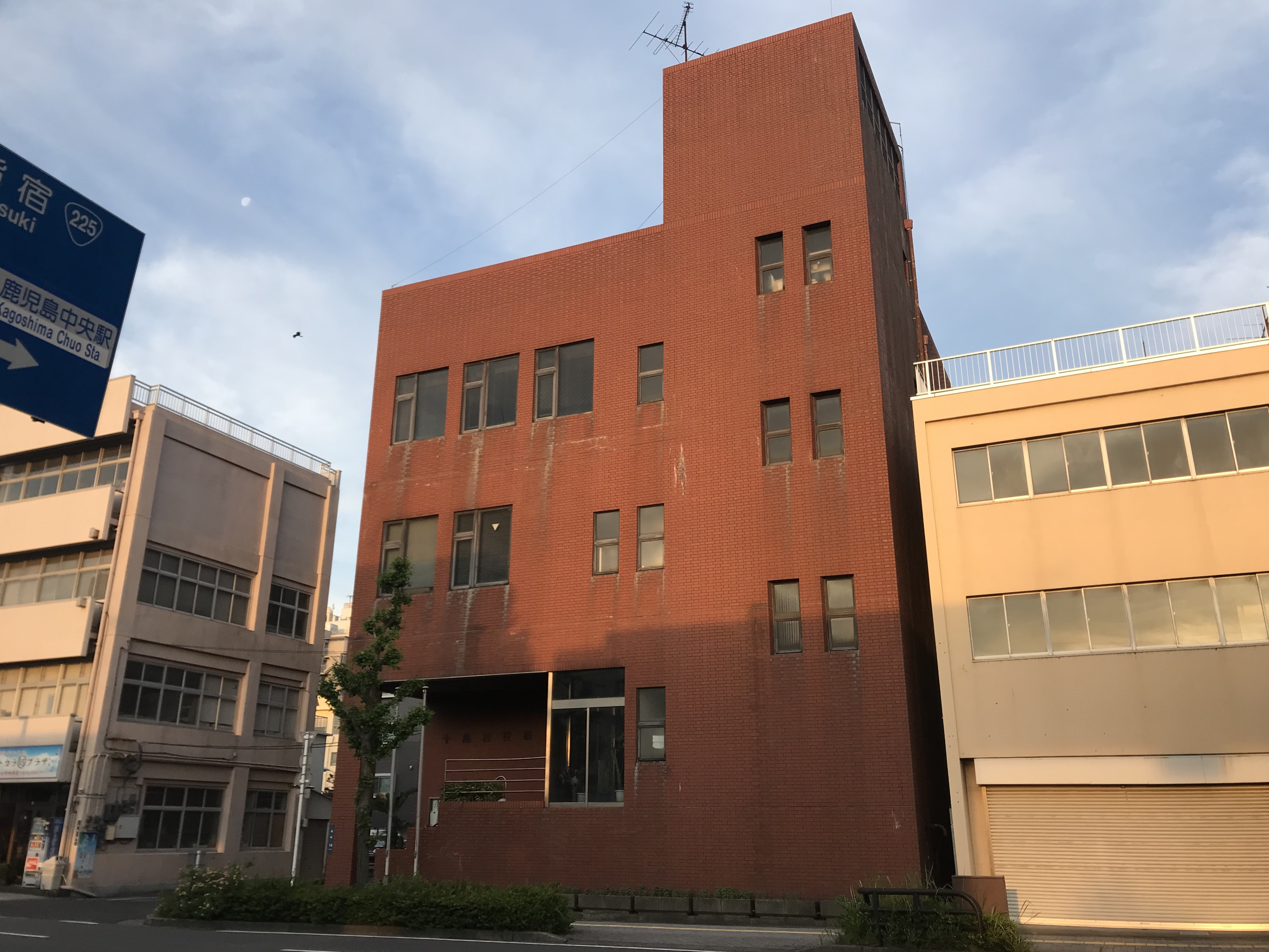
- Toshima Village Hall

- Flag Seal

- Location of Toshima in Kagoshima Prefecture

- Coordinates: 29°50′12″N 129°51′13″E
- Country: Japan
- Region: Kyushu (Tokara Islands)
- Prefecture: Kagoshima Prefecture
- District: Kagoshima

Government
  - - Mayor: Tadaaki Shikine

Area
  - Total: 101.35 km^{2} (39.13 sq mi)

Population (October 1, 2020)
  - Total: 740
  - Density: 7.3/km^{2} (19/sq mi)
- Time zone: UTC+9 (Japan Standard Time)
- Phone number: 099-222-2101
- Address: 14-15 Izumichō, Kagoshima-shi, Kagoshima-ken 892-0822
- Climate: Cfa
- Website: www.tokara.jp
- Symbols
- Bird: Ryukyu robin
- Flower: Marubasatsuki (Rhododendron eriocarpum (Hayata) Nakai)
- Tree: Chinese fan palm (Livistona chinensis)

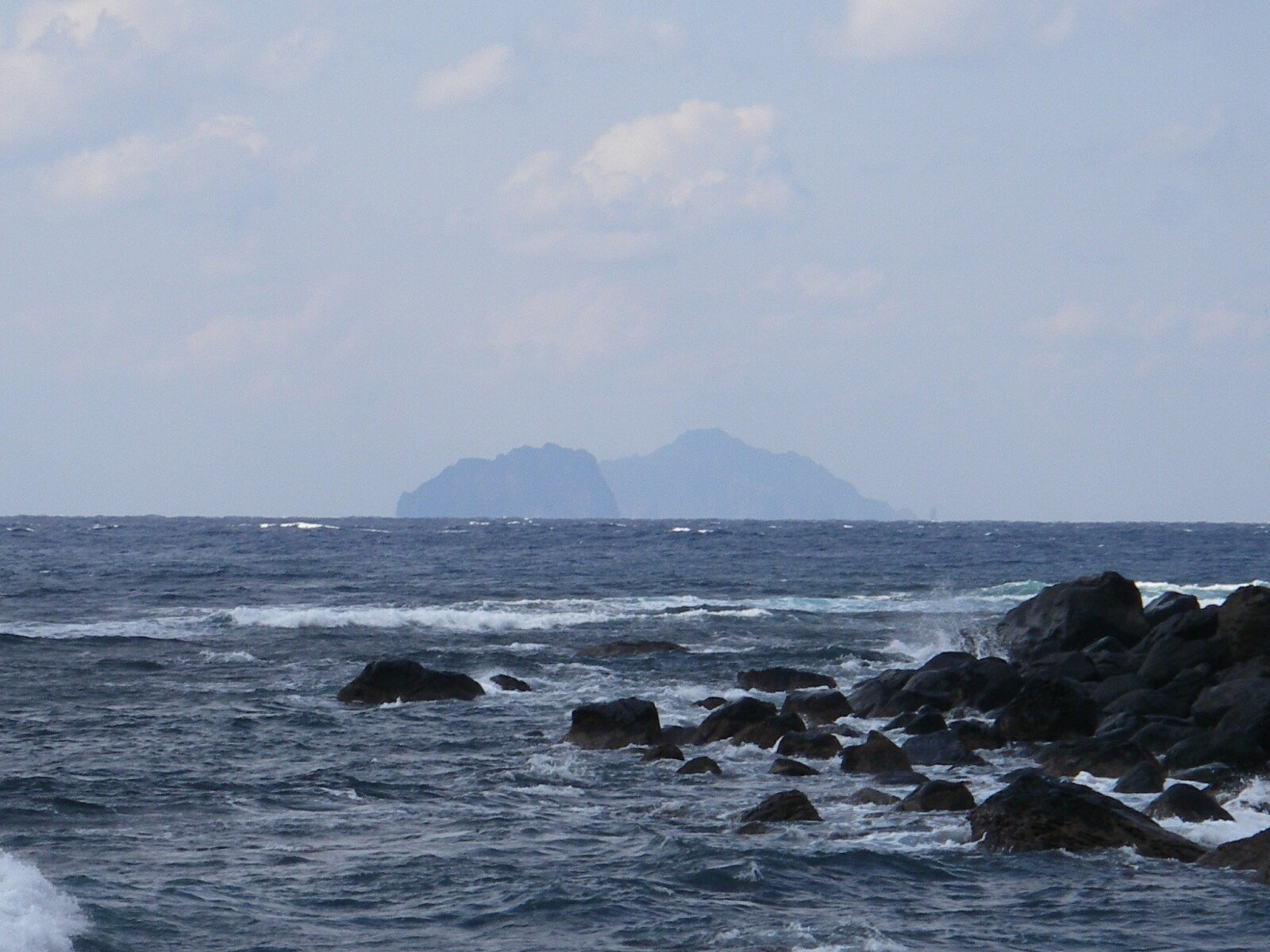
Gajaja Island and Ko-Gajaja Island, two islands located in the village.

Toshima (十島村, Toshima-mura; Japanese pronunciation: [tó̞.ɕì.mä̀, tò̞.ɕí.mä́]) is a village consisting of the islands of the Tokara Islands located in the Satsunan Islands of Kagoshima District, Kagoshima Prefecture, Japan. The village office is located in the city of Kagoshima, outside the village.

As of 1 October 2020, the village has an estimated population of 740 and a density of 7.3 persons per km^{2}. The total area is 101.35 km^{2}.

== Geography ==
The islands of Toshima Village are the exposed peaks of stratovolcanos rising from the ocean floor, and most are volcanically active.

=== Surrounding municipalities ===
- Amami
- Mishima

=== Climate ===
Toshima has a humid subtropical climate (Köppen climate classification Cfa) with hot summers and mild winters. Precipitation is significant throughout the year, and is heavier in summer, especially the months of June and July. The average annual temperature in Toshima is 19.0 °C (66.2 °F). The average annual rainfall is 3,626.7 mm (142.78 in) with June as the wettest month. The temperatures are highest on average in August, at around 26.7 °C (80.1 °F), and lowest in January, at around 11.1 °C (52.0 °F). Its record high is 35.2 °C (95.4 °F), reached on 18 August 2018, and its record low is −1.3 °C (29.7 °F), reached on 6 February 2003.

Climate data for Toshima, Nakanoshima (2003–2020 normals, extremes 2002–present)
Month	Jan	Feb	Mar	Apr	May	Jun	Jul	Aug	Sep	Oct	Nov	Dec	Year
Record high °C (°F)	21.7 (71.1)	24.0 (75.2)	24.8 (76.6)	25.9 (78.6)	31.1 (88.0)	31.8 (89.2)	34.4 (93.9)	35.2 (95.4)	32.2 (90.0)	30.6 (87.1)	26.2 (79.2)	23.1 (73.6)	35.2 (95.4)
Mean daily maximum °C (°F)	14.2 (57.6)	15.3 (59.5)	17.4 (63.3)	20.6 (69.1)	23.8 (74.8)	26.0 (78.8)	29.6 (85.3)	30.1 (86.2)	28.2 (82.8)	24.7 (76.5)	20.7 (69.3)	16.3 (61.3)	22.2 (72.0)
Daily mean °C (°F)	11.1 (52.0)	12.0 (53.6)	13.7 (56.7)	16.8 (62.2)	20.3 (68.5)	23.4 (74.1)	26.4 (79.5)	26.7 (80.1)	24.9 (76.8)	21.4 (70.5)	17.5 (63.5)	13.1 (55.6)	18.9 (66.1)
Mean daily minimum °C (°F)	7.6 (45.7)	8.3 (46.9)	9.8 (49.6)	12.6 (54.7)	16.4 (61.5)	21.0 (69.8)	24.0 (75.2)	24.0 (75.2)	22.0 (71.6)	18.2 (64.8)	14.0 (57.2)	9.8 (49.6)	15.6 (60.2)
Record low °C (°F)	−1.1 (30.0)	−1.3 (29.7)	0.5 (32.9)	1.0 (33.8)	5.6 (42.1)	11.6 (52.9)	17.2 (63.0)	17.7 (63.9)	14.8 (58.6)	7.2 (45.0)	4.0 (39.2)	2.0 (35.6)	−1.3 (29.7)
Average precipitation mm (inches)	196.7 (7.74)	219.6 (8.65)	276.3 (10.88)	286.1 (11.26)	367.3 (14.46)	757.9 (29.84)	323.9 (12.75)	193.4 (7.61)	320.8 (12.63)	238.3 (9.38)	256.5 (10.10)	204.8 (8.06)	3,626.7 (142.78)
Average precipitation days (≥ 1.0 mm)	15.4	13.8	14.0	12.7	13.9	18.4	10.0	11.8	13.4	11.4	11.9	15.2	161.9
Mean monthly sunshine hours	66.4	69.9	106.6	133.8	128.9	70.9	127.1	155.1	120.4	135.7	101.1	72.9	1,294.1
Source: Japan Meteorological Agency

== Demographics ==
Toshima's population has been declining slowly since the Japanese census began in 1950, dropping below 1,000 by 1980, and has since stabilized at around 700. Per the most recent census, the population of Toshima in 2020 was 740 people.

Historical population
Year	Pop.	±%
1950	2,968	—
1955	2,658	−10.4%
1960	2,602	−2.1%
1965	1,848	−29.0%
1970	1,407	−23.9%
1975	1,120	−20.4%
1980	903	−19.4%
1985	787	−12.8%
1990	790	+0.4%
1995	776	−1.8%
2000	756	−2.6%
2005	673	−11.0%
2010	658	−2.2%
2015	756	+14.9%
2020	740	−2.1%
Toshima population statistics

== History ==
Some of the islands have been inhabited since at least the Jōmon period. The islands were mentioned in the Shoku Nihongi and the Heike Monogatari, and local legend states that at least some of the islands were a refuge for the defeated Heike clan following the Genpei War. During the Edo period, the islands came under the control of the Shimazu clan of the Satsuma Domain.

After the Meiji Restoration, these islands were allotted to Kawanabe District of Satsuma Province, and then transferred to Ōshima District of Ōsumi Province in 1897. In 1908, the islands were grouped together with the Tokara Islands into Jitto Village (十島村, Jittō-son), of which seven were inhabited. At that time, the ten islands included Iōjima (硫黄島), Kuroshima (黒島), Takeshima (竹島), Kuchinoshima (口之島), Nakanoshima (中之島), Tairajima (平島), Suwanosejima (諏訪之瀬島), Akusekijima (悪石島), Kodakarajima (小宝島) and Takarajima (宝島).

After World War II, from 2 February 1946 all of the Japanese islands south of the 30th latitude, including the Tokara Islands, were placed under United States military administration as part of the Provisional Government of the Northern Ryukyu Islands. However, the three northern inhabited islands in the archipelago, known as the Kamimishima (上三島) – Iōjima, Kuroshima and Takeshima – remained under the control of Japan, and were placed under the administration of the village of Mishima. The remaining Tokara Islands were returned to Japan on 10 February 1952 and are now administered as the village of Toshima. In 1973, the two villages were transferred to Kagoshima District.
