= Shōwa Iōjima =

Japanese island

Coordinates: 30°48′15″N 130°20′30″E

Native name: 昭和硫黄島, Shōwa Iō-jima
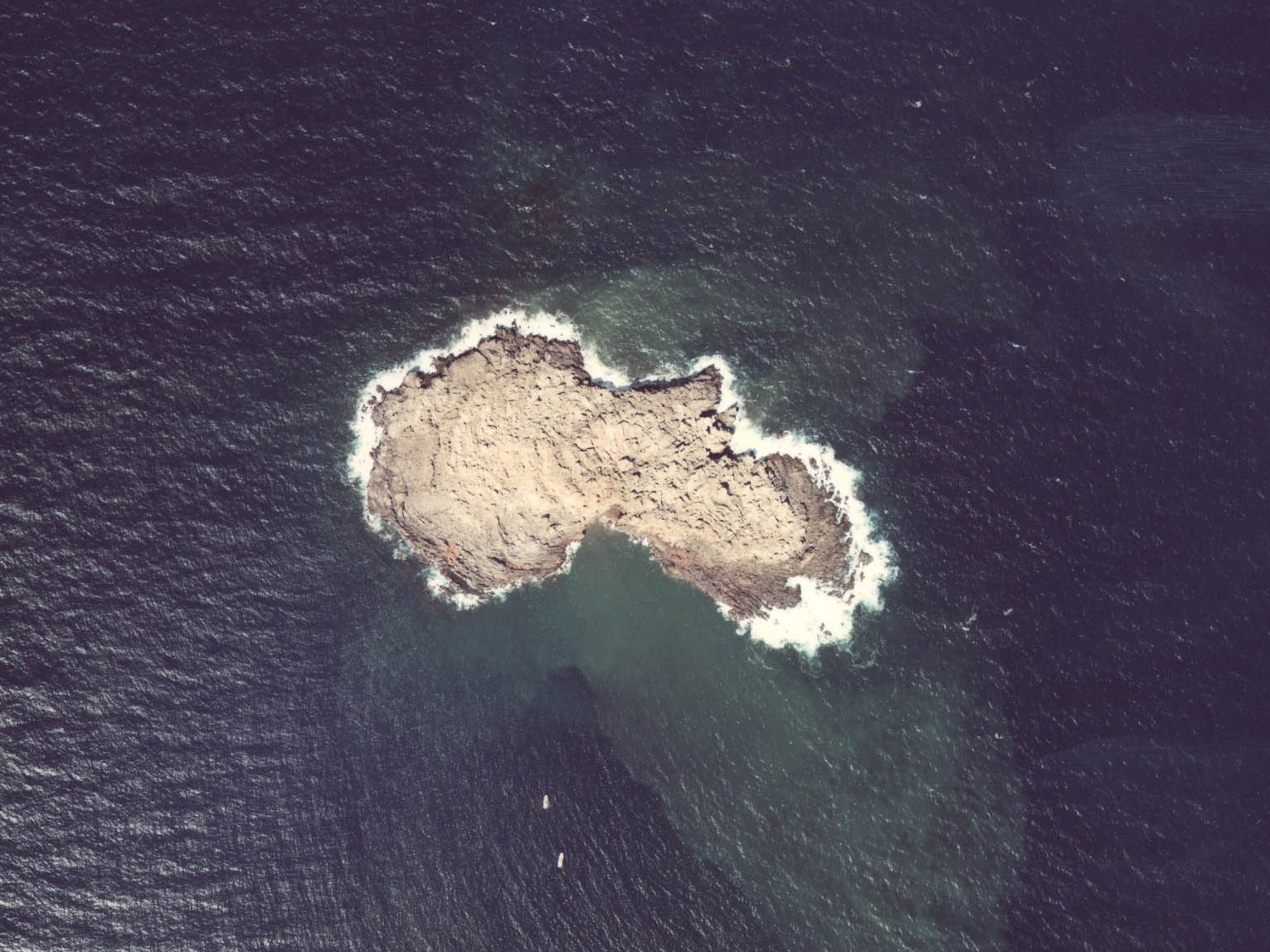
- Aerial view of the island (1977)

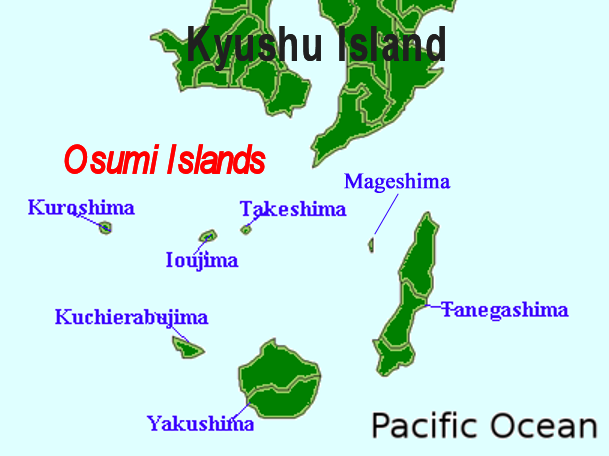

- Location within Kagoshima Prefecture Location within Japan

Geography
- Location: East China Sea
- Archipelago: Ōsumi Islands
- Area: 0.07 km^{2} (0.027 sq mi)
- Coastline: 1.3 km (0.81 mi)
- Highest elevation: 24 m (79 ft)

Administration
- Japan
- Prefectures: Kagoshima Prefecture
- District: Kagoshima District
- Village: Mishima

Demographics
- Population: uninhabited -

Shōwa Iōjima (昭和硫黄島), also known as Shōwa Shintō (昭和新島), is one of the Satsunan Islands, usually classed with the Ōsumi Islands, belonging to Kagoshima Prefecture, Japan. A deserted volcanic island, it is located just off the northern shore of Iōjima, Kagoshima.

== Geography ==
Shōwa Iōjima is one of the Ōsumi islands, and is located 2 kilometres (1.1 nmi) north of Iōjima. The island has an area of approximately 0.07 square kilometres (0.027 sq mi) with a coastline of 1.3 kilometres (0.81 mi) in length. The island is an exposed lava dome associated with the submarine Kikai Caldera, a stratovolcano rising from the ocean floor.

== History ==
Shōwa Iōjima came into existence during an eruption in 1934. On September 12, 1934, earthquakes began, continuing for several days. On September 17, a plume of ash and smoke erupted from the ocean surface, and by September 20 an island of ash and pumice began to form. Lava flows were confirmed on November 25, and on December 7, the existence of a new island was confirmed. The volcanic peak on the island reached a height of about 30 meters by December 23, but on December 30, the island sank beneath sea level and disappeared.

However, the island reemerged on January 5 and on January 19 a strong eruption with black clouds of volcanic smoke, ash, lava flows and an acidic rain began, continuing for several weeks. On March 8, residents of neighboring Iōjima made the first landing on the new island. By April 1, all volcanic activity and earthquakes ceased. At that time, the size of Shōwa Iōjima was estimated to be 0.18 square kilometres (0.069 sq mi). Subsequent erosion has reduced it to its present size.

== See also ==
- Desert island
- List of islands
