= Mount Iō (Iōjima) =

Active lava dome in Iojima, Kagoshima, Japan

- 硫黄岳
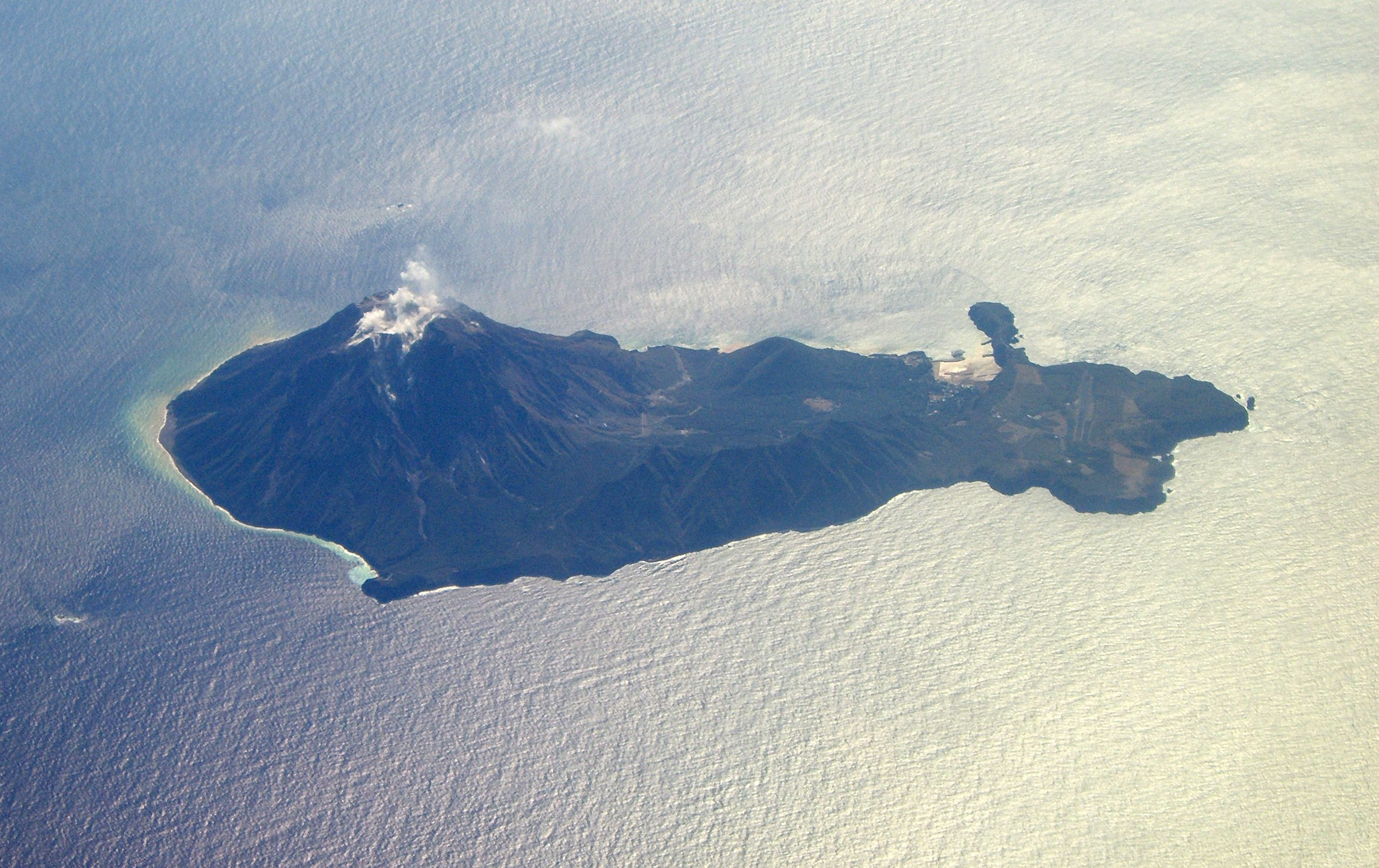
- Aerial view of Iōjima with Mount Iō steaming.(February 2008)

Highest point
- Elevation: 703.7 m (2,309 ft)
- Prominence: 704 m (2,310 ft)
- Listing: List of mountains and hills of Japan by height
- Coordinates: 30°47′35″N 130°18′19″E

Naming
- English translation: Sulphur Mountain
- Language of name: Japanese

Geography
- Location: Iōjima, Kagoshima Prefecture, Japan
- Parent range: Kikai Caldera
- Topo map(s): Geographical Survey Institute, 25000:1 薩摩硫黄島, 50000:1 開聞岳

Geology
- Rock age: Holocene
- Mountain type: Stratovolcano
- Volcanic arc: Ryukyu arc
- Last eruption: June 2013

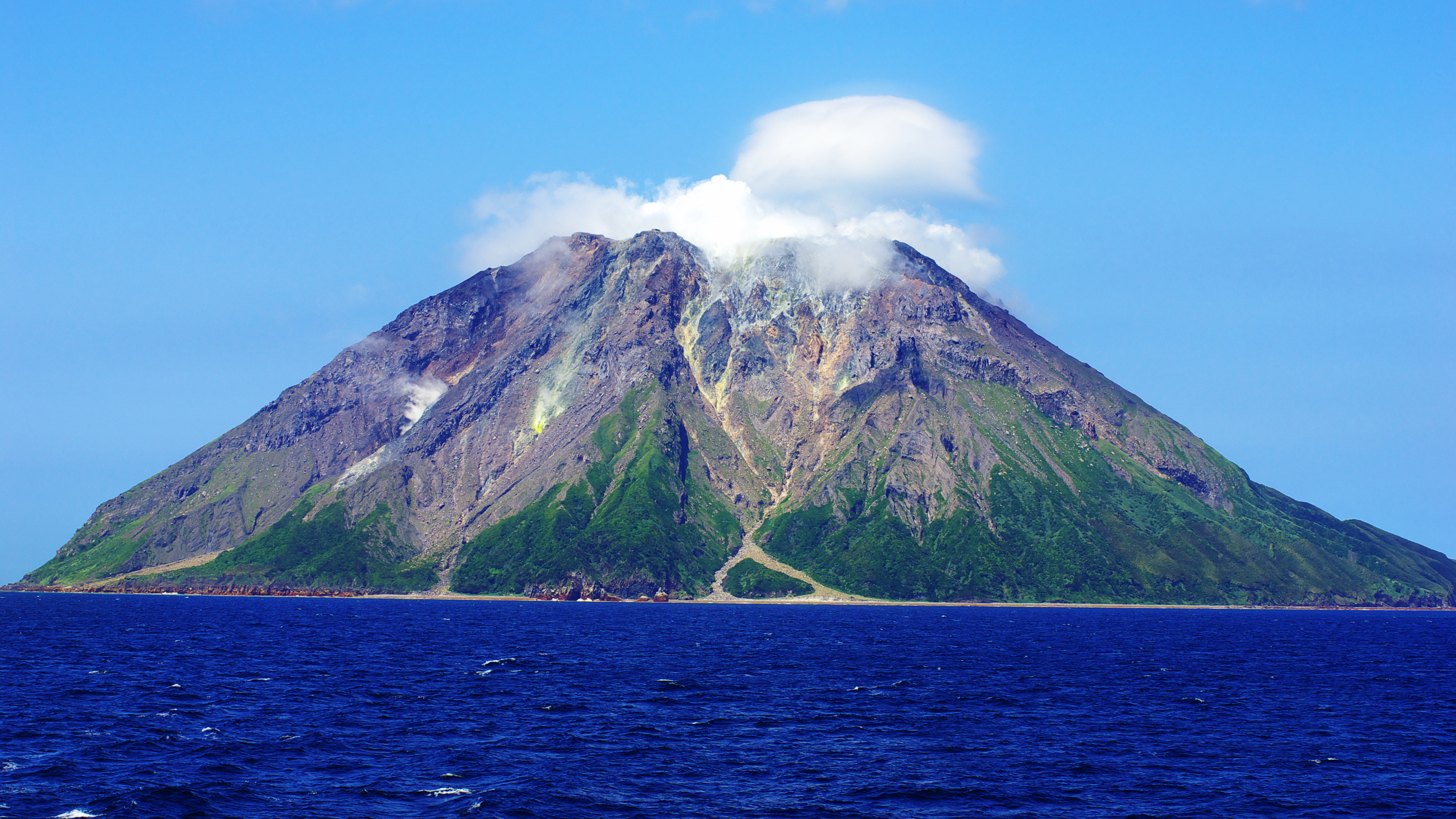
Mount Iō. May 2015. Taken from the east.

Mount Iō, (硫黄岳, Iō-dake) also known as Mount Iwo, is an active rhyolitic lava dome on Iōjima in Kagoshima Prefecture, Japan. It sits within the borders of the town of Mishima.

The mountain is made up of non-alkali felsic rock and pyroclasitic flows.
