= Mishima, Kagoshima =

Mishima 三島村
- Village
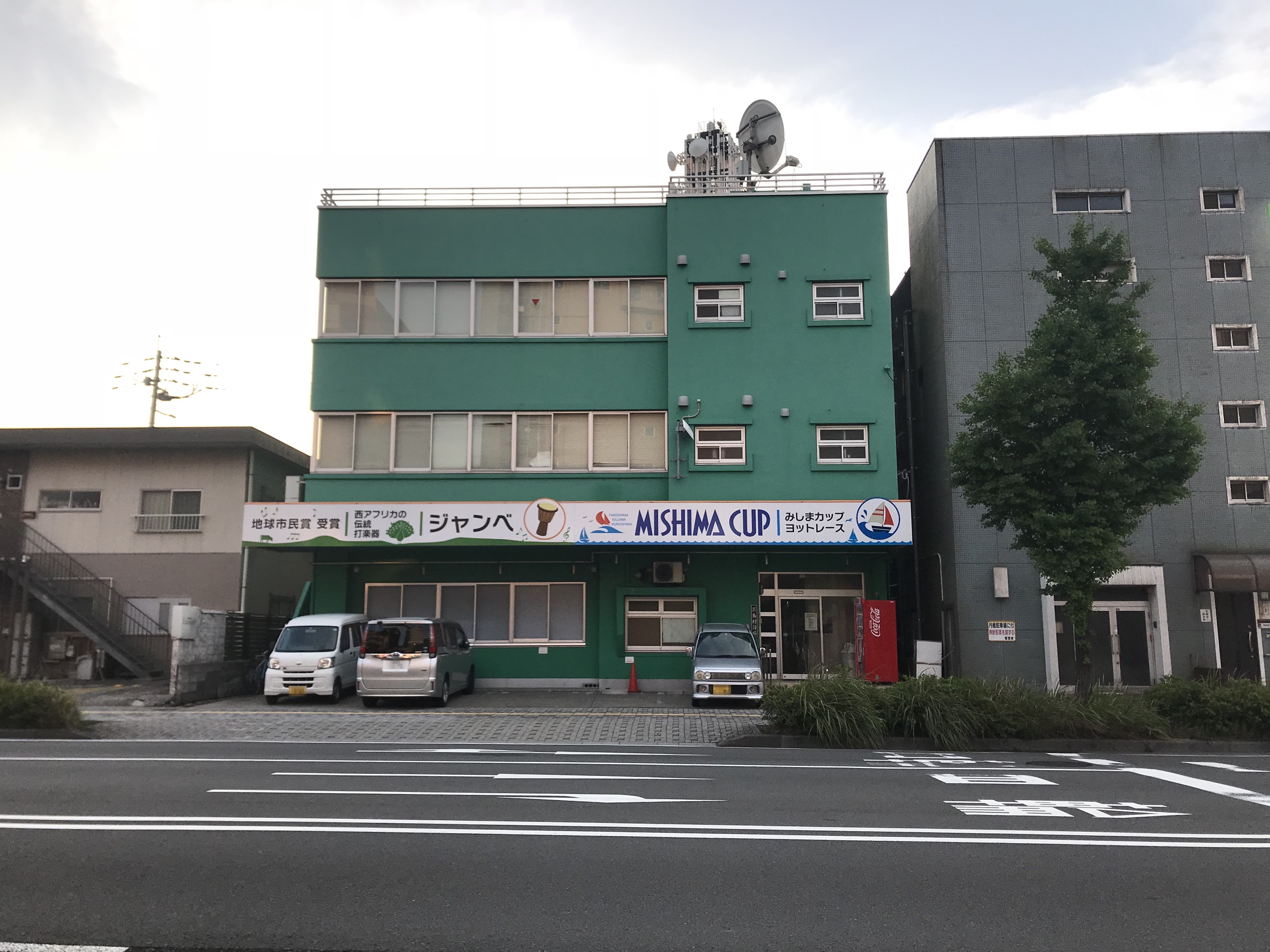
- Mishima Village Hall

- Flag Seal

- Location of Mishima in Kagoshima Prefecture

- Coordinates: 30°48′40″N 130°9′6″E
- Country: Japan
- Region: Kyushu (Ōsumi Islands)
- Prefecture: Kagoshima Prefecture
- District: Kagoshima

Government
  - - Mayor: Tatsuo Ōyama

Area
  - Total: 31.36 km^{2} (12.11 sq mi)

Population (October 1, 2020)
  - Total: 405
  - Density: 12.9/km^{2} (33/sq mi)
- Time zone: UTC+9 (Japan Standard Time)
- Phone number: 099-222-3141
- Address: 12-18, Meizanchō, Kagoshima-shi, Kagoshima-ken 892-0821
- Website: www.mishimamura.jp

Mishima (三島村, Mishima-mura) is a village consisting of the inhabited islands of Iōjima, Kuroshima and Takeshima and the uninhabited islands of Shōwa Iōjima and Denshima located in Kagoshima District, Kagoshima Prefecture, Japan. The village office is located in the city of Kagoshima, outside the village.

As of 1 October 2020, the village has an estimated population of 405 and a population density of 12.9 persons per square kilometre (33 per square mile). The total area is 31.36 km^{2} (12.11 sq mi).

== Geography ==
The islands of Miura Village are the northernmost of the Ryukyu archipelago, and although now grouped together with the Ōsumi Islands, are physically an extension of the Tokara island arc. All of the islands are the exposed peaks of stratovolcanos rising from the ocean floor, and most are volcanically active.

=== Surrounding municipalities ===
- Ibusuki
- Makurazaki
- Minamikyūshū
- Minamiōsumi
- Minamisatsuma
- Minamitane
- Nakatane
- Nishinoomote
- Yakushima

== History ==
The islands have been inhabited since at least the Jōmon period. During historic times, mentioned is made of the islands in the Heike monogatari and the Azuma Kagami, and local legend states that the islands were a refuge for the defeated Heike clan following the Genpei War. During the Edo period, the islands came under the control of the Shimazu clan of Satsuma Domain.

After the Meiji Restoration, these islands were allotted to Kawanabe District of Satsuma Province, and then transferred to Ōshima District of Ōsumi Province in 1897. In 1908, the islands were grouped together with the Tokara Islands into Jitto Village (十島村, Jitto-mura), of which seven were inhabited.

After World War II, from 2 February 1946 all of the Japanese islands south of 30th Latitude, including the Tokara Islands, were placed under United States military administration as part of the Provisional Government of Northern Ryukyu Islands. However, the three northern inhabited islands in the archipelago, known as the Kamimishima (上三島): Iōjima, Kuroshima and Takeshima, remained under the control of Japan, and were placed under the administration of the village of Mishima. The remaining Tokara Islands reverted to Japan on 10 February 1952 and are now administered as the village of Toshima. In 1973, the two villages were transferred to Kagoshima District.

== Culture ==
According to Kagoshima Prefecture's local government, Mishima village has several local festivals and activities that take place throughout the year.

These include the Hassaku Drum Dance at Iōjima which features depictions of the masked deity Mendon, and the Kuroshima Osato Hassaku Dance. Both events prominently feature masks and masked deities. One of Takeshima's festivals includes a depiction of the masked deity Takamen.
