= Ōsumi Islands =

Archipelago within the Ryukyu Islands

Native name: 大隅諸島 Ōsumi-shotō
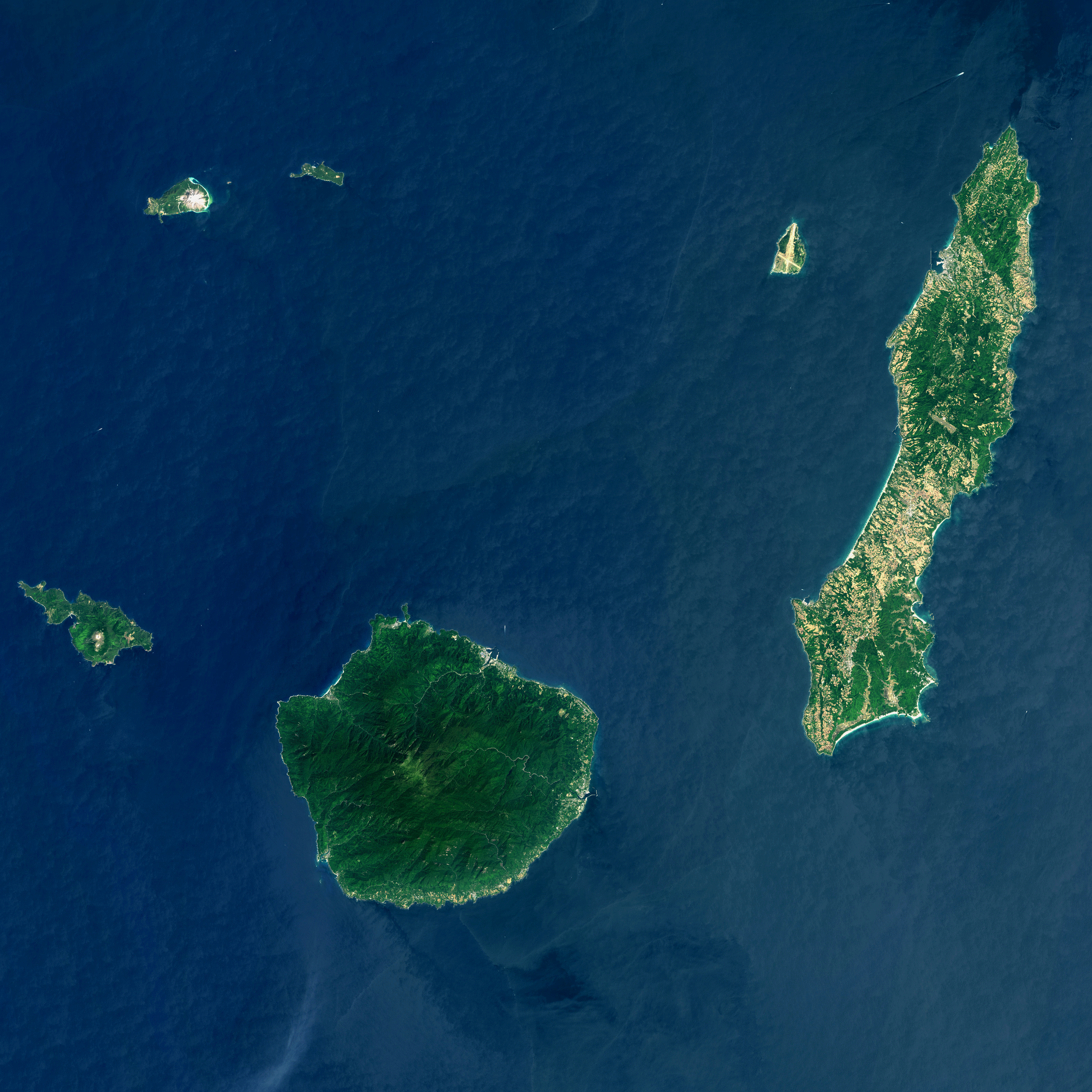
- Ōsumi Islands

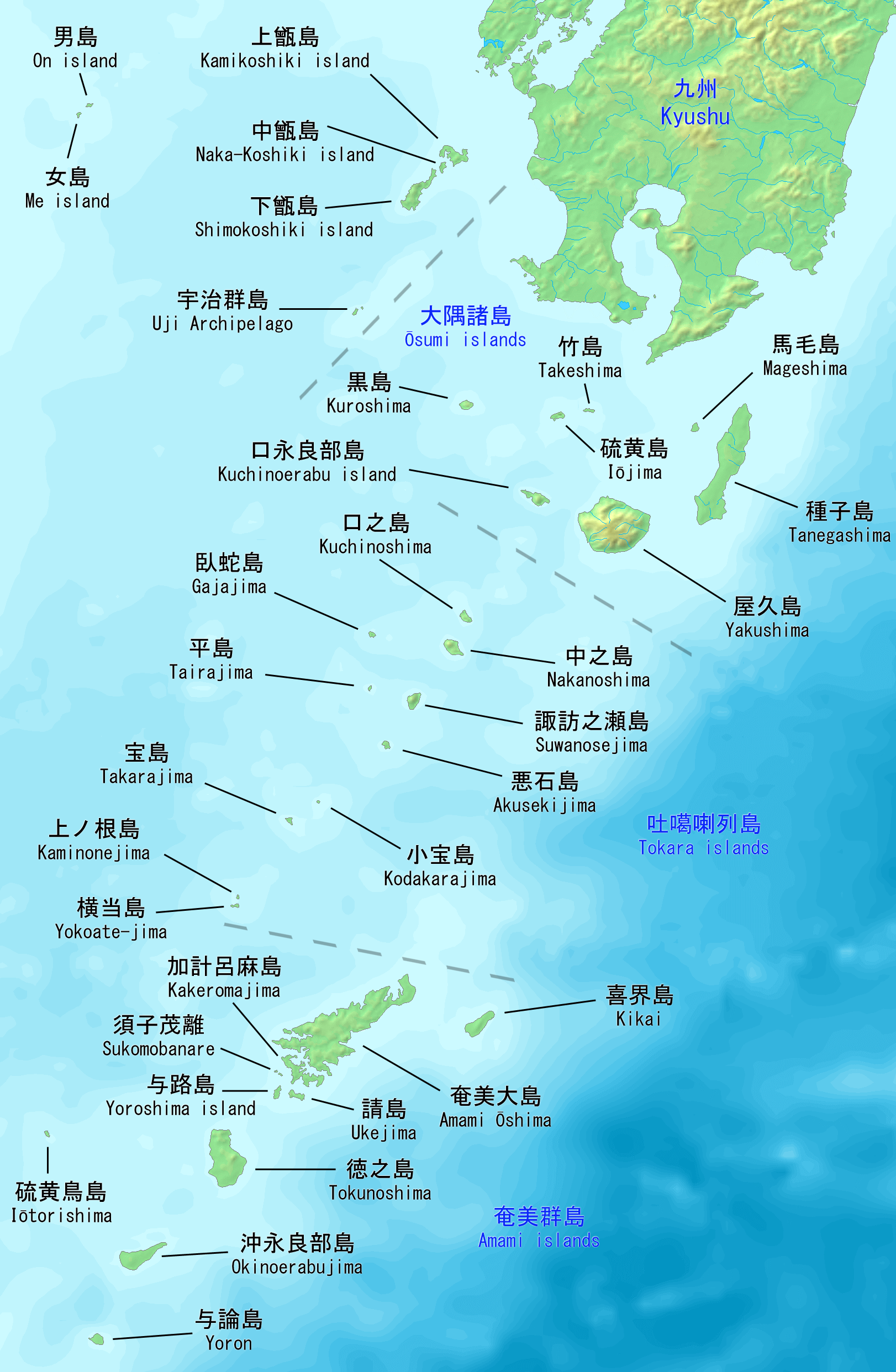
- Map of Kagoshima Prefecture

Geography
- Coordinates: 30°34′26″N 130°58′52″E
- Adjacent to: Pacific Ocean
- Total islands: 9
- Area: 1,030 km^{2} (400 sq mi)

Administration
- Japan
- Prefectures: Kagoshima
- Municipalities: Nishinoomote; Nakatane; Minamitane; Yakushima; Mishima

Demographics
- Population: 46,500 (2010)
- Ethnic groups: Japanese; Ryukyuan

The Ōsumi Islands (大隅諸島, Ōsumi-shotō) are an archipelago in the Ryukyu Archipelago, and are the northernmost group of the Ryukyu Islands, The chain extends from the southern tip of Kyushu to Yakushima. Administratively, the group belongs within Kagoshima Prefecture, Japan.

== Geography ==
The Ōsumi Islands are of volcanic origin and have a total area of approximately 1,030 square kilometres (400 sq mi). The highest elevation is Miyanouradake with a height of 1,935 metres (6,348 ft) on Yakushima. The climate is a humid subtropical climate (Köppen climate classification Cfa) with very warm summers and mild winters. Precipitation is high throughout the year, but is highest in the months of May, June and September.

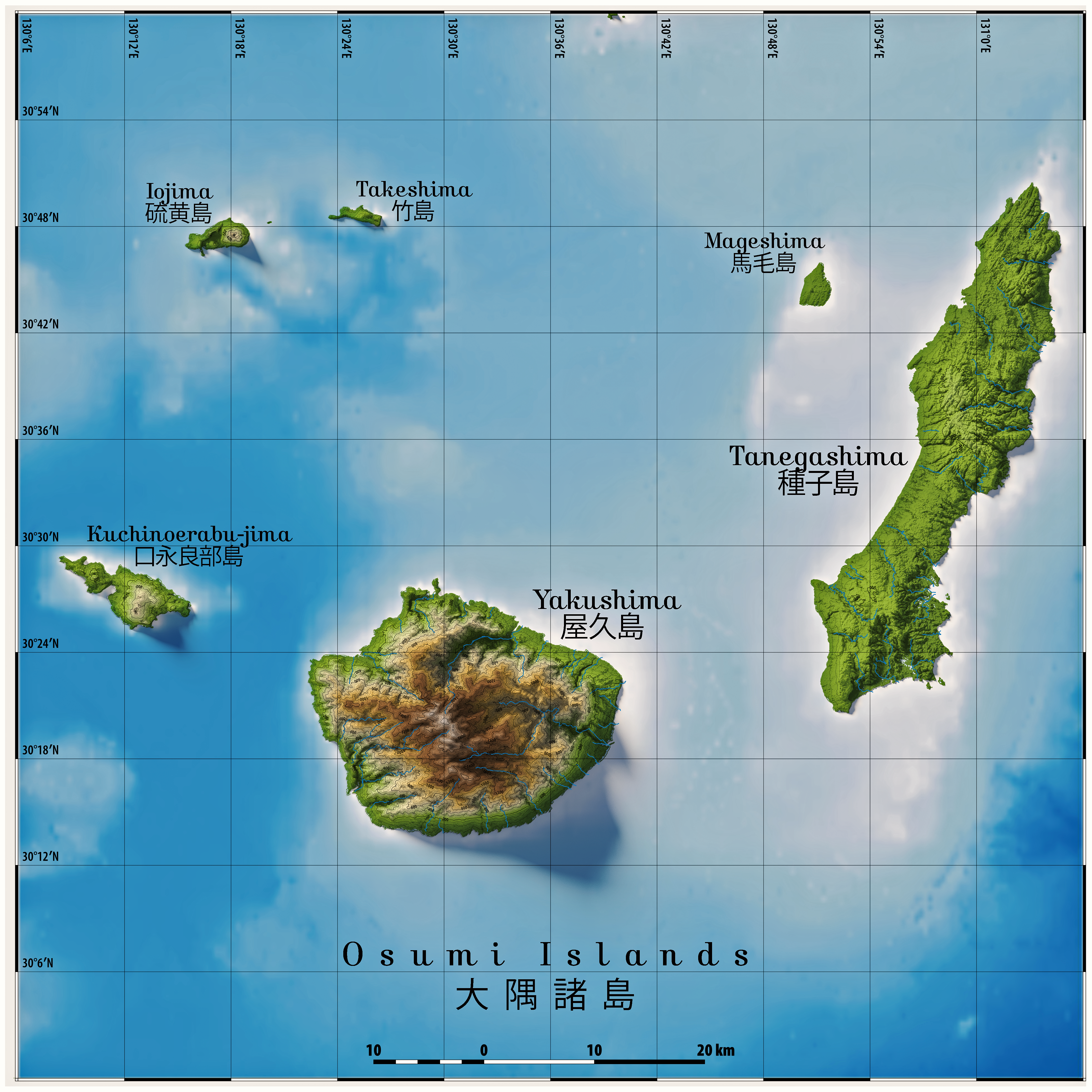
Map of the Ōsumi Islands

== History ==
The Ōsumi Islands have been settled since at least the Jōmon period. Burial sites on Tanegashima, namely the Yokomine and Hirota sites, attest to a uniquely well-developed Yayoi period culture at the end of the 4th century AD. The artifacts include magatama, an engraved pendant, and emblems with apparent writing.

Tanegashima and Yakushima are first mentioned in written documents of the Chinese Sui dynasty of the 6th century. Mention is made in the Japanese Shoku Nihongi under an entry for the year 699 of the islands of Tane, Yaku and Amami. The Ōsumi Islands formed ancient Tane Province during the Asuka period. The islands were often mentioned in the diaries of travelers between Tang-dynasty China and Nara period Japan.

Some of the islands in the archipelago have local legends of providing refuge to the Heike clan after their defeat in the Genpei War at the end of the Heian period. During the Sengoku period, in 1543 a Chinese vessel with the Portuguese Fernão Mendes Pinto stranded on Tanegashima and is credited with introducing firearms to Japan. In fact, Pinto was probably not present at the first Portuguese contact with the Japanese, although he did visit Tanegashima soon after and legend says he did marry a local woman and had a son. The Europeans had arrived to trade not only guns, but also soap, tobacco and other goods unknown in medieval Japan, for Japanese goods.

During the Edo period, Ōsumi Islands were ruled by the Shimazu clan of Satsuma Domain and was considered part of Ōsumi Province. Following the Meiji Restoration, the islands have been administered as part of Kagoshima Prefecture.

During The Battle of Okinawa in 1945, the Ōsumi Islands were subject to aerial bombardment by U.S. Navy and U.S. Army Air Force aircraft.

In 1969 the "Tanegashima Space Center" (TNSC) including a spaceport was opened by the Japan Aerospace Exploration Agency. The TNSC is located at the southeastern end of Tanegashima island.

== Transport ==
The Ōsumi Islands are served by New Tanegashima Airport and Yakushima Airport. There are regular connections with Kagoshima and the Amami Islands by ferries.

== Islands ==
Photo	Name	Kanji	Area [km^{2}]	Population	highest point [m]	Peak	Coordinates
	Yakushima	屋久島	504.88	11,698	1935	Miyanouradake	30°21′31″N 130°31′43″E
	Tanegashima	種子島	444.99	33,000	282.0		30°34′26″N 130°58′52″E
	Kuchinoerabu-jima	口永良部島	38.04	147	657	Furudake	30°28′N 131°11′E
	Mageshima	馬毛島	8.2	–	71.7	Takenokoshi	30°44′29.9″N 130°51′16.9″E
	Kuroshima	黒島	15.37	199	621.9	Yaguradake	30°50′5.6″N 129°57′20.7″E
	Iōjima	硫黄島	11.65	142	703.7	Iōdake	30°47′27″N 130°17′46″E
	Takeshima	竹島	4.2	78	220.0	Magomeyama	30°48′50″N 130°25′2.1″E
	Shōwa Iōjima	昭和硫黄島	0.07	–	24		30°48′15″N 130°20′30″E
	Denshima	デン島	0.001	-	58		30°45′02″N 130°06′07″E
