= Satsunan Islands =

Northern part of the Ryukyu Islands

Coordinates: 29°30′N 129°30′E

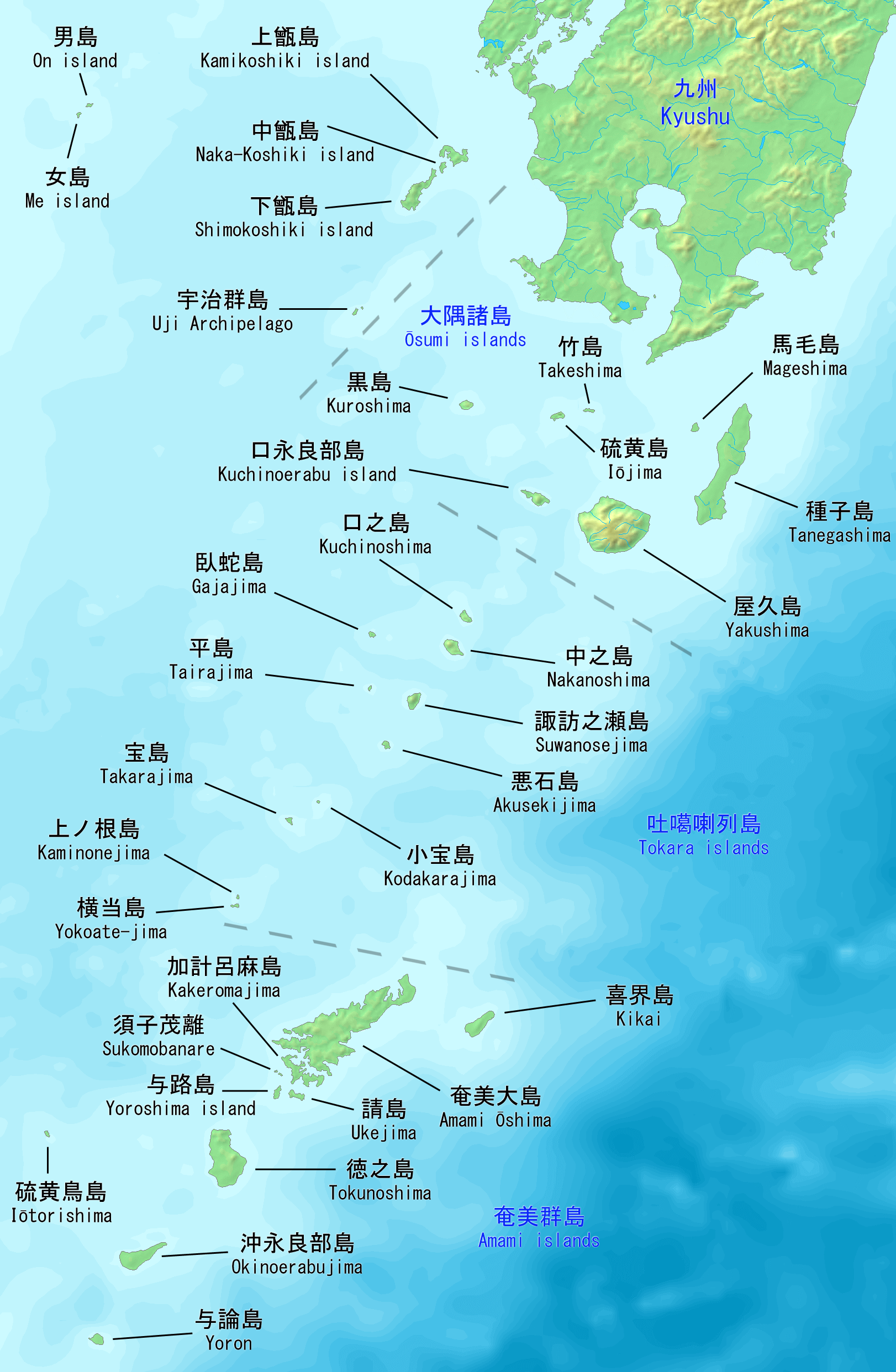
Satsunan Islands, including the Ōsumi, Tokara and Amami Islands

The Satsunan Islands (薩南諸島, Satsunan-shotō) is a geopolitical name for a group of islands that forms the northern part of the Ryukyu Islands. The whole island group belongs to Kagoshima Prefecture, Japan and has a total population of about 150,000 people.

== Major islands ==
- Satsunan Islands
  - Ōsumi Islands:
    - Tanegashima, Yakushima, Kuchinoerabu-jima, Mageshima in the North-Eastern Group,
    - Takeshima, Iōjima, Kuroshima in the North-Western Group.
  - Tokara Islands (The Shichi-tō): Kuchi-no-shima, Naka-no-shima, Gajajima, Suwanose-jima, Akuseki-jima, Tairajima, Kodakara-jima, Takara-jima
  - Amami Islands: Amami Ōshima, Kikaigashima, Kakeromajima, Yoroshima, Ukeshima, Tokunoshima, Okinoerabujima, Yoronjima

== History ==
Although Satsunan literally means the south of Satsuma Province, the north-eastern group of the Ōsumi Islands formed Tane Province for a brief period in the 8th and 9th centuries and then was merged into Ōsumi Province. The Tokara Islands and the northwestern group of the Ōsumi Islands belonged to Kawanabe District of Satsuma Province. The Amami Islands paid tribute to the Ryukyu Kingdom to the South until they were put under direct control in the late 16th century, but were conquered in 1609 by the Satsuma Domain.

In 1879, the Amami Islands became Ōshima District of Kagoshima Prefecture. The Tokara Islands and the north-western group of the Ōsumi Islands were transferred to Ōshima District in 1897, and then to Kagoshima District in 1973. After World War II, the Tokara and Amami Islands were put under United States military occupation, which formed the Government of the Northern Ryukyus. The Japanese government fiercely contested the Amami Islands being affiliated with the word "Ryukyu", believing that it would lead to a later return of the islands to their control. The Tokara Islands were returned to Japan in 1952, and the Amami Islands in December 1953.

== See also ==
- Nansei Islands
- List of islands of Japan
