= Ryukyu Islands =

Japanese island chain

Okinawan language: Ruuchuu (琉球(ルーチュー)) Japanese language: Nansei-shotō (南西諸島, Southwest Islands) Ryūkyū-rettō (琉球列島, Ryukyu Islands)
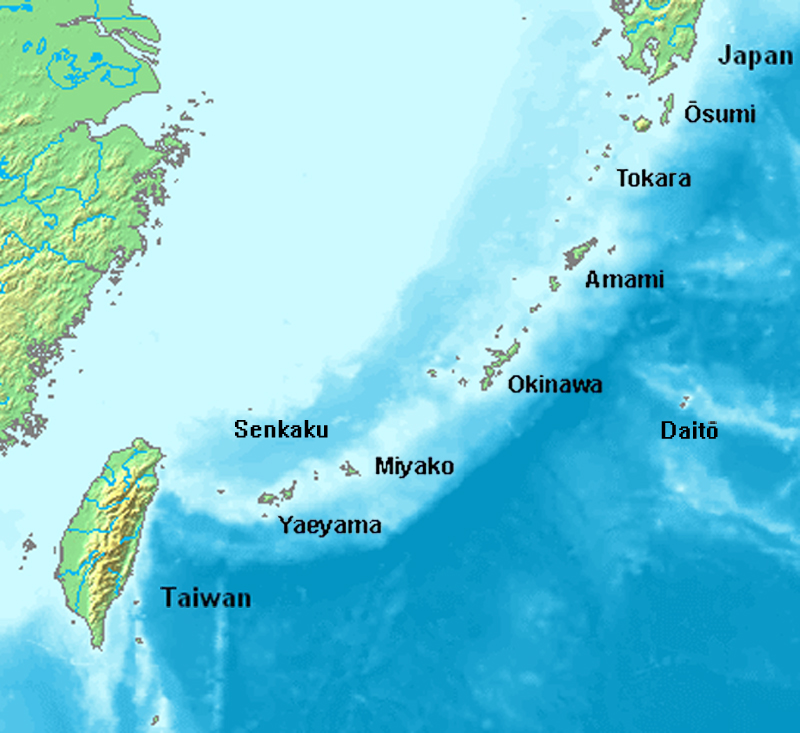

- Location of the Ryukyu Islands

Geography
- Location: On the boundary between the East China Sea and the Philippine Sea
- Coordinates: 26°30′N 127°54′E
- Total islands: 100+
- Major islands: Amami Ōshima; Okinawa Island
- Area: 4,642.11 km^{2} (1,792.33 sq mi)
- Highest elevation: 1,936 m (6352 ft)
- Highest point: Mount Miyanoura

Administration
- Japan
- Prefecture: Kagoshima Prefecture; Okinawa Prefecture

Demographics
- Demonym: Ryukyuan
- Population: 1,550,161 (2005)
- Pop. density: 333.93/km^{2} (864.87/sq mi)
- Ethnic groups: Ryukyuans, Japanese

The Ryukyu Islands (Note: English: /riˈ(j)uːkjuː/) (Japanese: 琉球列島, Hepburn: Ryūkyū Rettō (Note: Japanese: [ɾʲjɨ̀ɨ́.k̟ʲj̊ɨ́ɨ̀, -k̟ʲj̊ɨ́ɨ́ ɾé̞t̚.tò̞ò̞, ɾʲjɨ́ɨ́-])), also known as the Nansei Islands (南西諸島, Nansei Shotō (Note: Japanese: [nä̀ɰ̃́.séí ɕó̞.tò̞ò̞, -séé-, nä́ɰ̃́-]); lit. 'Southwest Islands') or the Ryukyu Arc (琉球弧, Ryūkyū-ko), are a chain of Japanese islands that stretch southwest from Kyushu to Taiwan. Administratively, they are divided between Kagoshima Prefecture (the Satsunan Islands, further divided into the Ōsumi, Tokara, and Amami Islands) and Okinawa Prefecture (further divided into the Okinawa, Miyako, Yaeyama, Daitō, and Senkaku Islands). The larger ones are mostly volcanic islands and the smaller mostly coral. The largest is Okinawa Island.

The climate of the islands ranges from humid subtropical climate (Köppen climate classification Cfa) in the north to tropical rainforest climate (Köppen climate classification Af) in the south. Precipitation is very high and is affected by the rainy season and typhoons. Except the outlying Daitō Islands, the island chain has two major geologic boundaries, the Tokara Strait (between the Tokara and Amami Islands) and the Kerama Gap (between the Okinawa and Miyako Islands). The islands beyond the Tokara Strait are characterized by their coral reefs.

The Ōsumi and Tokara Islands, the northernmost of the islands, fall under the cultural sphere of the Kyushu region of Japan; local inhabitants speak a variation of the Kagoshima dialect of Japanese. The Amami, Okinawa, Miyako, and Yaeyama Islands have a native population collectively called the Ryukyuan people, named for the former Ryukyu Kingdom (1429–1875) that ruled them. The varied Ryukyuan languages are traditionally spoken on these islands, and the major islands have their own distinct languages. In modern times, the Japanese language has been the primary language of the islands, with the Okinawan Japanese dialect prevalently spoken. The outlying Daitō Islands were uninhabited until the Meiji period, when their development was started mainly by people from the Izu Islands south of Tokyo, with the people there speaking the Hachijō language.

The islands were held by the United States after the 1951 Treaty of San Francisco concluded the Pacific War. They were returned to Japan under the 1971 Okinawa reversion agreement, with China disputing the Senkaku Islands.

Administratively, the islands are divided between two prefectures: the northern islands, collectively called the Satsunan Islands, are part of Kagoshima Prefecture (specifically Kagoshima District, Kumage Subprefecture/District, and Ōshima Subprefecture/District), while the southern part of the chain makes up Okinawa Prefecture. The divide is between the Amami and Okinawa Islands, with the Daitō Islands part of Okinawa Prefecture.

== Geography ==
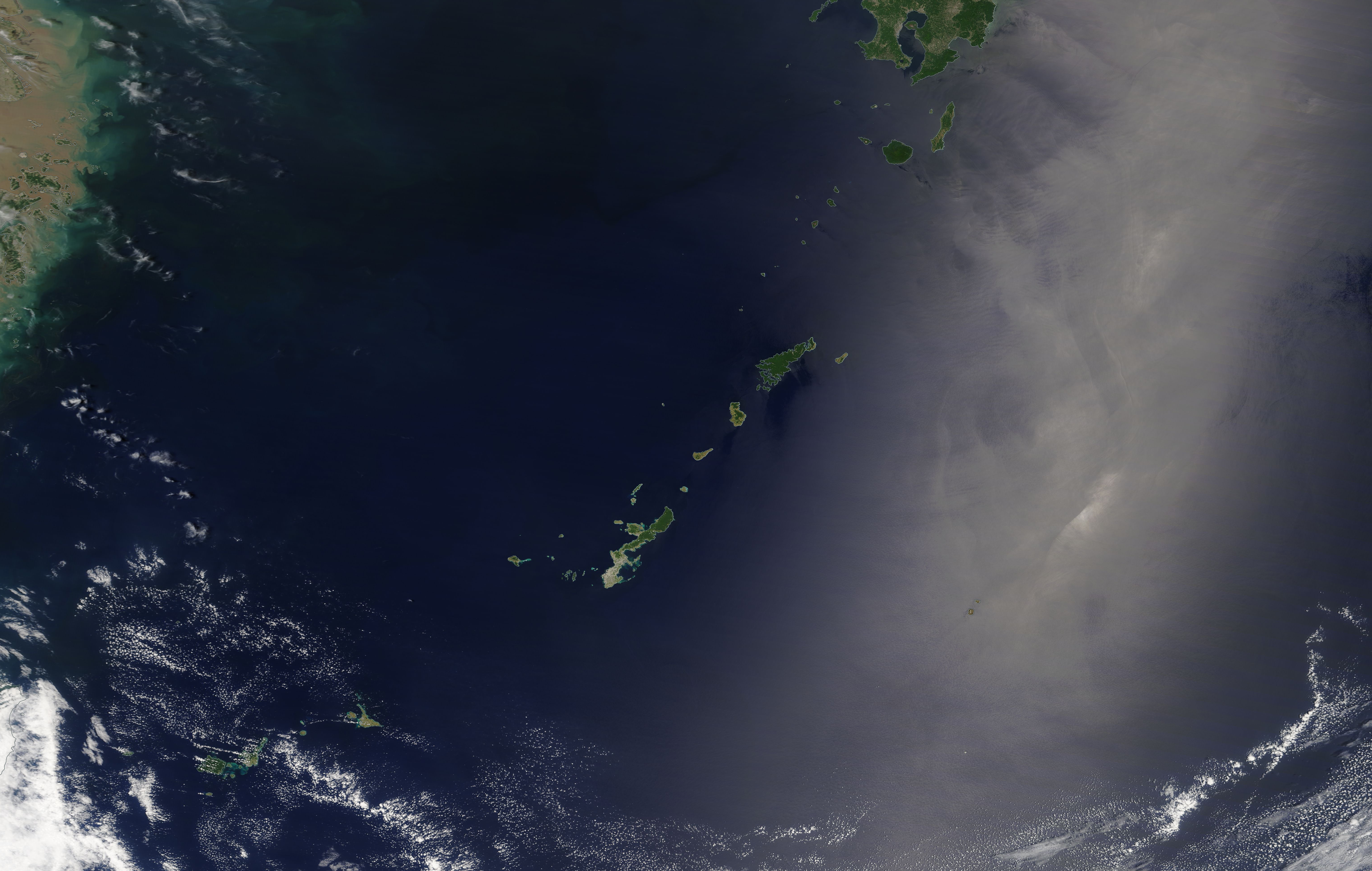
Satellite photo of the Ryukyu islands (Nansei islands)

=== Island subgroups ===
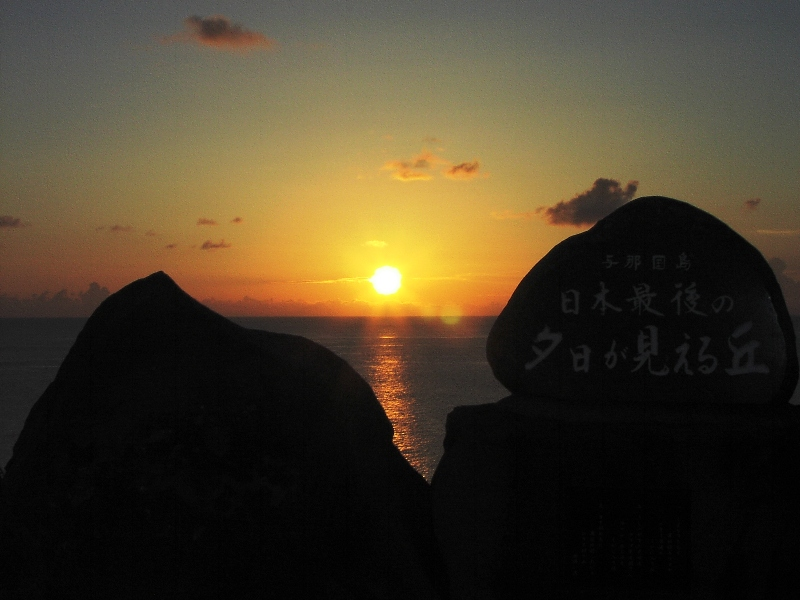
The last sunset in Japan is seen from Yonaguni.

The Ryukyu islands are commonly divided into two or three primary groups:

- either administratively, with the Northern Ryukyus being the islands in Kagoshima Prefecture (known in Japanese as the "Satsunan Islands") and the Southern Ryukyus being the islands in Okinawa Prefecture (known in Japanese as the "Ryukyu Islands"),
- or geographically, with the islands north of the Tokara Strait (Ōsumi and Tokara) being the Northern Ryukyus, those between the Tokara Strait and Kerama Gap (Amami and Okinawa) being the Central Ryukyus, and those south of the Kerama Gap (Miyako and Yaeyama) being the Southern Ryukyus.

The following are the grouping and names used by the Hydrographic and Oceanographic Department of the Japan Coast Guard. The islands are listed from north to south where possible.

- Nansei Islands (南西諸島, Nansei-shotō)
  - Satsunan Islands (薩南諸島, Satsunan-shotō)
    - Ōsumi Islands (大隅諸島, Ōsumi-shotō) with:
      - Tanegashima, Yakushima, Kuchinoerabu, Mageshima in the North-Eastern Group,
      - Takeshima, Iōjima, Kuroshima in the North-Western Group.
    - Tokara Islands (吐噶喇列島, Tokara-rettō): Kuchinoshima, Nakanoshima, Gajajima, Suwanosejima, Akusekijima, Tairajima, Kodakarajima, Takarajima
    - Amami Islands (奄美群島, Amami-guntō): Amami Ōshima, Kikaijima, Kakeromajima, Yoroshima, Ukeshima, Tokunoshima, Okinoerabujima, Yoronjima
  - Ryukyu Islands (琉球諸島, Ryūkyū-shotō)
    - Okinawa Islands (沖縄諸島, Okinawa-shotō): Okinawa Island, Kume, Iheya, Izena, Aguni, Ie (Iejima), Iōtorishima
      - Kerama Islands (慶良間諸島, Kerama-shotō): Tokashiki, Zamami, Aka, Geruma
    - Sakishima Islands (先島諸島, Sakishima-shotō; the "Further Isles")
      - Miyako Islands (宮古列島, Miyako-rettō): Miyakojima, Ikema, Ōgami, Irabu, Shimoji, Kurima-jima, Minna, Tarama
      - Yaeyama Islands (八重山列島, Yaeyama-rettō): Iriomote, Ishigaki, Taketomi, Kohama, Kuroshima, Aragusuku, Hatoma, Yubujima, Hateruma, Yonaguni
      - Senkaku Islands (尖閣諸島, Senkaku-shotō; claimed by China and Taiwan): Uotsurijima, Kuba Jima, Taisho Jima, Kita Kojima, Minami Kojima
  - Daitō Islands (大東諸島, Daitō-shotō): Kita Daitō, Minami Daitō, Oki Daitō

The Geospatial Information Authority of Japan, another government organization that is responsible for standardization of place names, disagrees with the Japan Coast Guard over some names and their extent, but the two are working on standardization. They agreed on 15 February 2010, to use Amami-guntō (奄美群島) for the Amami Islands; prior to that, Amami-shotō (奄美諸島) had also been used.

=== Climate ===
The climate of the Ryukyu islands is sub-tropical. It is significantly warmer than the main islands Kyushu, Shikoku and Honshu. There are occasional typhoons during the summer. Winter temperature is mild with optimal clearness of the ocean water.

== Names and extents ==
The English and Japanese uses of the term "Ryukyu" differ. In English, the term Ryukyu may apply to the entire chain of islands, while in Japanese Ryukyu usually refers only to the islands that were previously part of the Ryūkyū Kingdom after 1624.

=== Nansei Islands ===
Nansei-shotō (南西諸島) is the official name for the whole island chain in Japanese. Japan has used the name on nautical charts since 1907. Based on the Japanese charts, the international chart series uses Nansei Shoto.

Nansei literally means "southwest", the direction of the island chain relative to mainland Japan. Some humanities scholars prefer the uncommon term Ryūkyū-ko (琉球弧, "Ryukyu Arc") for the entire island chain. In geology, however, the Ryukyu Arc includes subsurface structures such as the Okinawa Trough and extends to Kyushu.

During the American occupation of Amami, the Japanese government objected to the islands being included under the name "Ryukyu" in English because they worried that this might mean that the return of the Amami Islands to Japanese control would be delayed until the return of Okinawa. However, the American occupational government on Amami continued to be called the "Provisional Government for the Northern Ryukyu Islands" in English, though it was translated as Rinji Hokubu Nansei-shotō Seichō (臨時北部南西諸島政庁, Provisional Government for the Northern Nansei Islands) in Japanese.

=== Ryukyu ===
The name of Ryūkyū (琉球) is strongly associated with the Ryukyu Kingdom, a kingdom that originated from the Okinawa Islands and subjugated the Sakishima and Amami Islands. The name is generally considered outdated in Japanese although some entities of Okinawa still bear the name, such as the local national university. FC Ryukyu is the maximum football representative of the prefecture in the Japanese football league system and has played as high as the second-tier J2 League.

In Japanese, the "Ryukyu Islands" (琉球諸島, Ryūkyū-shotō) cover only the Okinawa, Miyako, and Yaeyama Islands, while in English it includes the Amami and Daitō Islands. The northern half of the island chain is referred to as the Satsunan ("South of Satsuma") Islands in Japanese, as opposed to Northern Ryukyu Islands in English.

Humanities scholars generally agree that the Amami, Okinawa, Miyako, and Yaeyama Islands share much cultural heritage, though they are characterized by a great degree of internal diversity as well. There is, however, no good name for the group. The native population do not have their own name, since they do not recognize themselves as a group this size. Ryukyu is the principal candidate because it roughly corresponds to the maximum extent of the Ryūkyū Kingdom. However, it is not necessarily considered neutral by the people of Amami, Miyako, and Yaeyama, who were marginalized under the Okinawa-centered kingdom. The Ōsumi Islands are not included because they are culturally part of Kyushu. There is a high degree of confusion in use of Ryukyu in English literature. For example, Encyclopædia Britannica equates the Ryukyu Islands with Japanese Ryūkyū-shotō or Nansei-shotō in the definition but limits its scope to the Amami, Okinawa and Sakishima (Miyako and Yaeyama) in the content.

==== Historical usage ====
"Ryūkyū" is an exonym and is not a self-designation. The word first appeared in the Book of Sui (636). Its obscure description of Liuqiu (流求) is the source of a never-ending scholarly debate about whether the name referred to Taiwan, Okinawa or both. Nevertheless, the Book of Sui shaped perceptions of Ryūkyū for a long time. Ryūkyū was considered a land of cannibals and aroused a feeling of dread among surrounding people, from Buddhist monk Enchin who traveled to Tang China in 858 to an informant of the Hyōtō Ryūkyū-koku ki who traveled to Song China in 1243. Later, some Chinese sources used "Great Ryukyu" (Chinese: 大琉球; pinyin: Dà Liúqiú) for Okinawa and "Lesser Ryukyu" (Chinese: 小琉球; pinyin: Xiǎo Liúqiú) for Taiwan. Okinawan forms of "Ryūkyū" are Ruuchuu (ルーチュー) or Duuchuu (ドゥーチュー) in Okinawan and Ruuchuu (ルーチュー) in the Kunigami language. An Okinawan man was recorded as having referred to himself as a "Doo Choo man" during Commodore Matthew C. Perry's visit to the Ryūkyū Kingdom in 1852.

From about 1829 until the mid-20th century, the islands' English name was spelled Luchu, Loochoo, Loo-choo, or Lewchew, all pronounced /ˈluːtʃuː/. These spellings were based on the Okinawan form Ruuchuu (ルーチュー), as well as the Chinese pronunciation of the characters "琉球", which in Mandarin is Liúqiú.

=== Okinawa ===
Uchinaa (沖縄), Okinawa in Okinawan, is originally a native name for the largest island in the island chain. The island was referred to as Okinawa (阿児奈波) in the 8th century biography of Jianzhen (唐大和上東征傳). It is also specified as Okinawa (おきなわ) in hiragana in the collection of Umuru U Sōshi (おもろさうし), known as Ryukyu's official poetry book. It was not until the 18th century that Okinawa was specified in its own script as 沖縄.

The Japanese map series known as the Ryukyu Kuniezu lists the island as Wokinaha Shima (悪鬼納嶋) in 1644 and Okinawa Shima (沖縄嶋) after 1702. The name Okinawa Shima was chosen by the Meiji government for the new prefecture when they annexed the Ryukyu Kingdom in 1879.

Outside of Okinawa Prefecture, the word "Okinawa" is used to refer to Okinawa Prefecture and does not include Kagoshima Prefecture. (People from the Amami Islands, Kagoshima Prefecture object to being included in "Okinawa".) Inside Okinawa Prefecture, "Okinawa" is used to refer to Okinawa Island, and does not include the Miyako and Yaeyama Islands. People in the Yaeyama Islands use the expression "go to Okinawa" when they visit Okinawa Island.

Some scholars group the Amami and Okinawa Islands together because in some respects (e.g. from a linguistic point of view) Amami is closer to Okinawa than to Miyako and Yaeyama, but there is no established single-word term for the group since the native population had not felt the need for such a concept. Japanese scholars use "Amami–Okinawa" while American and European scholars use "Northern Ryukyuan".

=== Southern Islands ===
The folklorist Kunio Yanagita and his followers used Nantō (南島, "Southern Islands"). This term was originally used by the imperial court of Ancient Japan. Yanagita hypothesized that the southern islands were the origin of the Japanese people and preserved many elements that were subsequently lost in Japan. The term is outdated today.

== History ==
=== Eastern Islands of Liuqiu ===
The first mention of the islands in Chinese literature occur in the Records of the Grand Historian. Qin Shi Huang heard of "happy immortals" living on the Eastern Islands, so he sent expeditions there to find the source of immortality, to no avail. Based on Ryukyuan folklore on Kudaka Island, some scholars believe that these expeditions succeeded in reaching Japan and launched a social and agricultural revolution there. The Eastern Islands are again mentioned as the land of immortals in the Annals of the Han dynasty.

In 601, the Chinese sent an expedition to the "Country of Liuqiu" (流求國). They noted that the people were small but pugnacious. The Chinese could not understand the local language and returned to China. In 607, they sent another expedition to trade and brought back one of the islanders. A Japanese embassy was in Luoyang when the expedition returned, and one of the Japanese exclaimed that the islander wore the dress and spoke the language of Yaku Island.

=== Ancient Japan's Southern Islands ===
The island chain appeared in Japanese written history as Southern Islands (南島, Nantō). The first record of the Southern Islands is an article of 616 in the Nihonshoki (720) which states that people of Yaku (掖玖,夜勾) followed the Japanese emperor's virtue. In 629, the Yamato imperial court dispatched an expedition to Yaku. Yaku in historical sources was not limited to modern-day Yakushima but seems to have covered a broader area of the island chain. In 657, several persons from Tokara (都貨邏; possibly Dvaravati) arrived at Kyushu, reporting that they had first drifted to Amami Island (海見島, Amamijima), which is the first attested use of Amami.

Articles of the late 7th century give a closer look at the southern islands. In 677, the imperial court gave a banquet to people from Tane Island (多禰島, Tanejima). In 679, the imperial court sent a mission to Tane Island. The mission carried some people from the southern islands who were described as the peoples of Tane, Yaku, and Amami (阿麻彌) in the article of 682. According to the Shoku Nihongi (797), the imperial court dispatched armed officers in 698 to explore the southern islands. As a result, people of Tane, Yaku, Amami and Dokan visited the capital (then Fujiwara-kyō) to pay tribute in the next year. Historians identify Dokan as Tokunoshima of the Amami Islands. An article of 714 reports that an investigative team returned to the capital, together with people of Amami, Shigaki (信覺), and Kumi (球美) among others. Shigaki should be Ishigaki Island of the Yaeyama Islands. Some identify Kumi as Iriomote Island of the Yaeyama Islands because Komi is an older name for Iriomote. Others consider that Kumi corresponded to Kume Island of the Okinawa Islands. Around this time "Southern Islands" replaced Yaku as a collective name for the southern islands.

In the early 8th century, the northern end of the island chain was formally incorporated into the Japanese administrative system. After a rebellion was crushed, Tane Province was established around 702. Tane Province consisted of four districts and covered Tanegashima and Yakushima. Although the tiny province faced financial difficulties from the very beginning, it was maintained until 824 when it was merged into Ōsumi Province.

Ancient Japan's commitment to the southern islands is attributed to ideological and strategic factors. Japan applied to herself the Chinese ideology of emperorship that required "barbarian people" who longed for the great virtue of the emperor. Thus Japan treated people on its periphery, i.e., the Emishi to the east and the Hayato and the Southern Islanders to the south, as "barbarians". The imperial court brought some of them to the capital to serve the emperor. The New Book of Tang (1060) states at the end of the chapter of Japan that there were three little princes of Yaku (邪古), Haya (波邪), and Tane (多尼). This statement should have been based on a report by Japanese envoys in the early 8th century who would have claimed the Japanese emperor's virtue. At the site of Dazaifu, the administrative center of Kyushu, two wooden tags dated in the early 8th century were unearthed in 1984, which read "Amami Island" (㭺美嶋, Amamijima) and "Iran Island" (伊藍嶋, Iran no Shima) respectively. The latter seems to correspond to Okinoerabu Island. These tags might have been attached to "red woods", which, according to the Engishiki (927), Dazaifu was to offer when they were obtained from the southern islands.

Sea routes used by Japanese missions to Tang China

The southern islands had strategic importance for Japan because they were on one of the three major routes used by Japanese missions to Tang China (630–840). The 702 mission seems to have been the first to successfully switch from the earlier route via Korea to the southern island route. The missions of 714, 733 and 752 probably took the same route. In 754, the Chinese monk Jianzhen managed to reach Japan. His biography Tō Daiwajō Tōseiden (779) makes reference to Akonaha (阿兒奈波) on the route, which may refer to modern-day Okinawa Island. An article of 754 states that the government repaired mileposts that had originally been set in the southern islands in 735. However, the missions from 777 onward chose another route that directly connected Kyūshū to China. Thereafter the central government lost its interest in the southern islands.

=== Kikaigashima and Iōgashima ===
The southern islands reappeared in written history at the end of the 10th century. According to the Nihongi ryaku (c. 11th–12th centuries), Dazaifu, the administrative center of Kyushu, reported that the Nanban (southern barbarians) pirates, who were identified as Amami islanders by the Shōyūki (982–1032 for the extant portion), pillaged a wide area of Kyūshū in 997. In response, Dazaifu ordered "Kika Island" (貴駕島, Kikashima) to arrest the Nanban. This is the first attested use of Kikaigashima, which is often used in subsequent sources.

The series of reports suggest that there were groups of people with advanced sailing technology in Amami and that Dazaifu had a stronghold on Kikai Island. In fact, historians hypothesize that the Amami Islands were incorporated into a trade network that connected it to Kyūshū, Song China and Goryeo. In fact, the Shōyūki recorded that in the 1020s, local governors of southern Kyūshū presented to the author, a court aristocrat, local specialties of the southern islands including the Chinese fan palm, redwoods, and shells of Green Turban Shell. The Shinsarugakuki, a fictional work written in the mid-11th century, introduced a merchant named Hachirō-mauto, who traveled all the way to the land of the Fushū in the east and to Kika Island (貴賀之島, Kikanoshima) in the west. The goods he obtained from the southern islands included shells of Green Turban Shell and sulfur. The Shinsarugakuki was not mere fiction; the Golden Hall of Chūson-ji (c. 1124) in northeastern Japan was decorated with tens of thousands of green turban shells.

Some articles of 1187 of the Azuma Kagami state that Ata Tadakage of Satsuma Province fled to Kikai Island (貴海島, Kikaishima) sometime around 1160. The Azuma Kagami also states that in 1188 Minamoto no Yoritomo, who soon became the shōgun, dispatched troops to pacify Kikai Island (貴賀井島, Kikaishima). It was noted that the imperial court objected the military expedition claiming that it was beyond Japan's administration. The Tale of the Heike (13th century) depicted Kikai Island (鬼界島, Kikaishima), where Shunkan, Taira no Yasuyori, and Fujiwara no Naritsune were exiled following the Shishigatani Incident of 1177. The island depicted, characterized by sulfur, is identified as Iōjima of the Ōsumi Islands, which is part of Kikai Caldera. Since China's invention of gunpowder made sulfur Japan's major export, Sulfur Island or Iōgashima became another representative of the southern islands. It is noted by scholars that the character representing the first syllable of Kikai changed from ki (貴, noble) to ki (鬼, ogre) from the end of the 12th century to the early 13th century.

The literature-based theory that Kikai Island was Japan's trade center of the southern islands is supported by the discovery of the Gusuku Site Complex in 2006. The group of archaeological sites on the plateau of Kikai Island is one of the largest sites of the era. It lasted from 9th to 13th centuries and at its height from the second half of the 11th to the first half of the 12th century. It was characterized by a near-total absence of the native Kaneku Type pottery, which prevailed in coastal communities. What were found instead were goods imported from mainland Japan, China and Korea. Also found was the Kamuiyaki pottery, which was produced in Tokunoshima from the 11th to 14th centuries. The skewed distribution of Kamuiyaki peaked at Kikai and Tokunoshima suggests that the purpose of Kamuiyaki production was to serve it to Kikai.

=== Shimazu Estate and Kamakura shogunate's expansion ===
Around the Hōen era (1135–1141), Tanegashima became part of Shimazu Estate on southern Kyūshū. The Shimazu Estate was said to have established at Shimazu, Hyūga Province in 1020s and dedicated to Kanpaku Fujiwara no Yorimichi. In the 12th century, Shimazu Estate expanded to a large portion of the Satsuma and Ōsumi Provinces including Tanegashima.

Koremune no Tadahisa, a retainer of the Fujiwara family, was appointed as a steward of Shimazu Estate in 1185. He was then named shugo of Satsuma and Ōsumi (and later Hyūga) Provinces by first shōgun Minamoto no Yoritomo in 1197. He became the founder of the Shimazu clan. Tadahisa lost power when his powerful relative Hiki Yoshikazu was overthrown in 1203. He lost the positions of shugo and jitō and only regained the posts of shugo of Satsuma Province and jitō of the Satsuma portion of Shimazu Estate. The shugo of Ōsumi Province and jitō of the Ōsumi portion of Shimazu Estate, both of which controlled Tanegashima, were succeeded by the Hōjō clan (especially its Nagoe branch). The Nagoe family sent the Higo clan to rule Ōsumi. A branch family of the Higo clan settled in Tanegashima and became the Tanegashima clan.

The islands other than Tanegashima were grouped as the Twelve Islands and treated as part of Kawanabe District, Satsuma Province. The Twelve Islands were subdivided into the Near Five (口五島/端五島, Kuchigoshima/Hajigoshima) and the Remote Seven (奥七島, Okunanashima). The Near Five consisted of the Ōsumi Islands except Tanegashima while the Remote Seven corresponded to the Tokara Islands. After the Jōkyū War in 1221, the jitō of Kawanabe District was assumed by the Hōjō Tokusō family. The Tokusō family let its retainer Chikama clan rule Kawanabe District. In 1306, Chikama Tokiie created a set of inheritance documents that made reference to various southern islands. The islands mentioned were not limited to the Twelve but included Amami Ōshima, Kikai Island and Tokunoshima (and possibly Okinoerabu Island) of the Amami Islands. An extant map of Japan held by the Hōjō clan describes Amami as a "privately owned district". The Shimazu clan also claimed the rights to the Twelve. In 1227 Shōgun Kujō Yoritsune affirmed Shimazu Tadayoshi's position as the jitō of the Twelve Islands among others. After the Kamakura shogunate was destroyed, the Shimazu clan increased its rights. In 1364, it claimed the "eighteen islands" of Kawanabe District. In the same year, the clan's head Shimazu Sadahisa gave his son Morohisa properties in Satsuma Province including the Twelve Islands and the "extra five" islands. The latter must be the Amami Islands.

=== Tanegashima under the Tanegashima clan ===
The Tanegashima clan came to rule Tanegashima on behalf of the Nagoe family but soon became autonomous. It usually allied with, sometimes submitted itself to, and sometimes antagonized the Shimazu clan on mainland Kyūshū. The Tanegashima clan was given Yakushima and Kuchinoerabu Island by Shimazu Motohisa in 1415. In 1436, it was given the Seven Islands of Kawanabe District, Satsuma Province (the Tokara Islands) and other two islands by Shimazu Mochihisa, the head of a branch family.

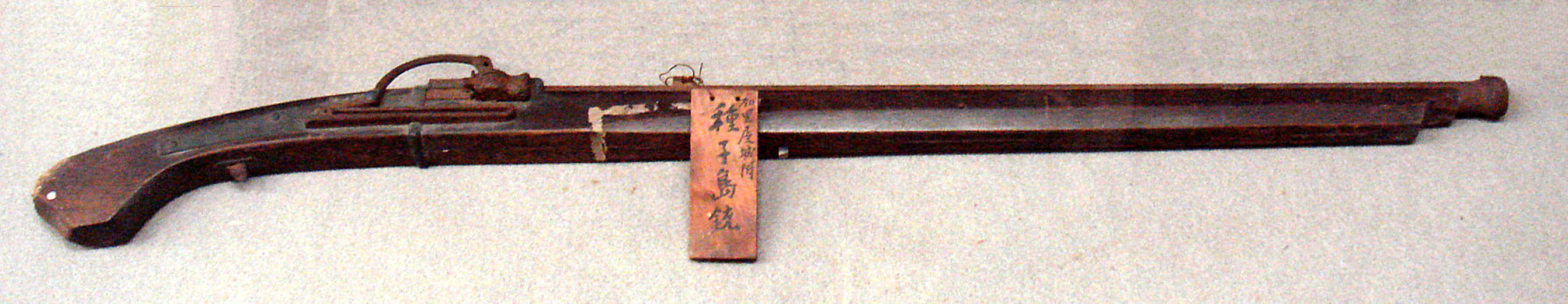
Tanegashima matchlock

Tanegashima is known in Japanese history for the introduction of European firearms to Japan. Around 1543, a Chinese junk with Portuguese merchants on board was driven to Tanegashima. Tanegashima Tokitaka succeeded in reproducing matchlock rifles obtained from the Portuguese. Within a few decades, firearms, then known as tanegashima, were spread across Sengoku Japan.

Toyotomi Hideyoshi's reunification of Japan finalized the Tanegashima clan's status as a senior vassal of the Shimazu clan. It was relocated to Chiran of mainland Kyūshū in 1595. Although it moved back to Tanegashima in 1599, Yakushima and Kuchinoerabu Island fall under the direct control of the Shimazu clan. These islands all constituted Satsuma Domain during the Edo period.

=== Amami and Tokara Islands ===
The Amami Islands were a focal point for dispute between the southward-expanding Satsuma Domain and the northward-expanding Ryukyu Kingdom. In 1453, a group of Koreans were shipwrecked on Gaja Island, where they found the island half under the control of Satsuma and half under the control of Ryukyu. Gaja Island is only 80 miles from Satsuma's capital at Kagoshima City. It was noted by the Koreans that the Ryukyuans used guns "as advanced as in [Korea]". Other records of activity in the Amami Islands show Shō Toku's conquest of Kikai Island in 1466, a failed Satsuma invasion of Amami Ōshima in 1493, and two rebellions on Amami Ōshima during the 16th century. The islands were finally conquered by Satsuma during the 1609 Invasion of Ryukyu. The Tokugawa shogunate granted Satsuma the islands in 1624. During the Edo Period, Ryukyuans referred to Satsuma's ships as "Tokara ships".

=== Okinawa Islands ===
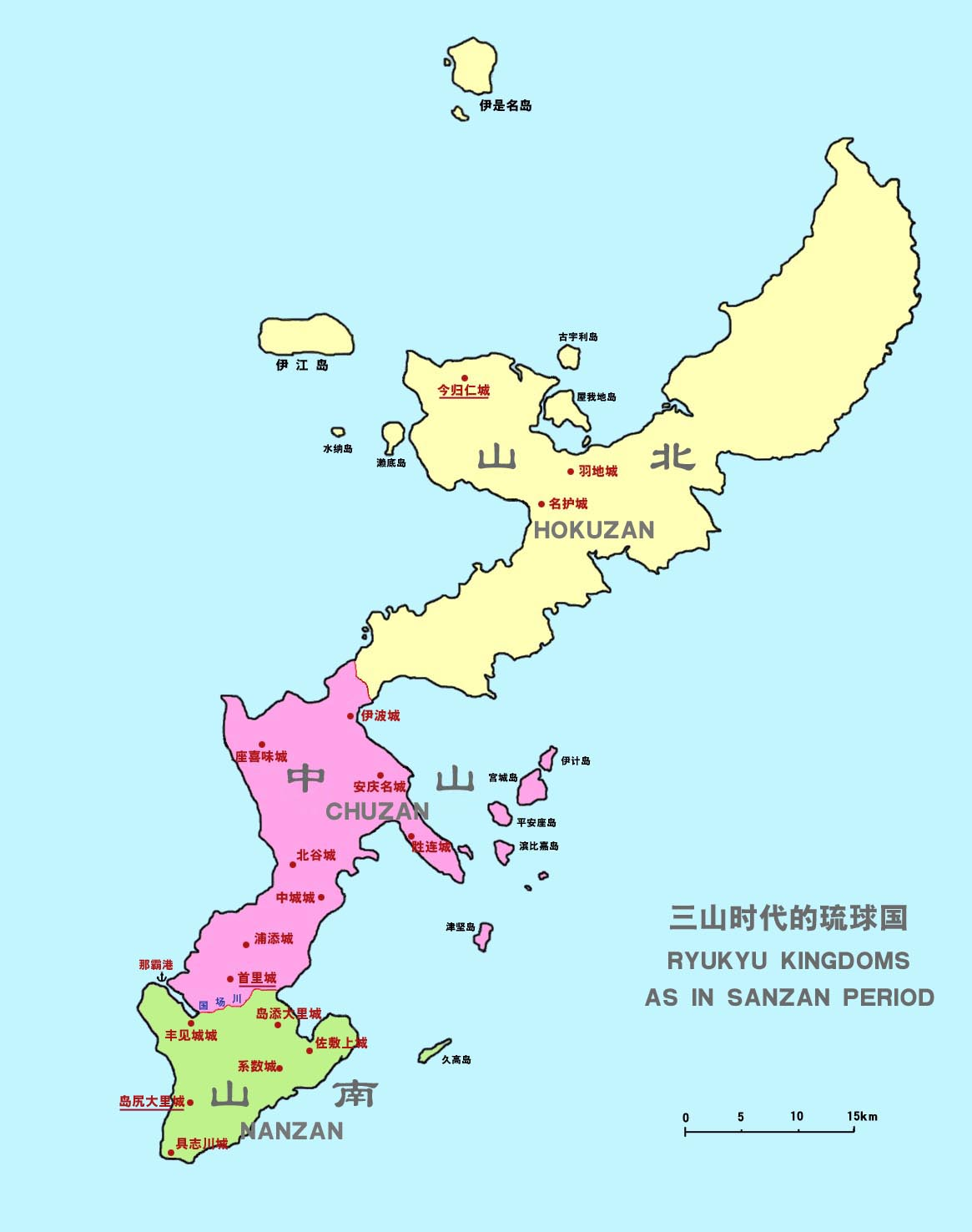
Okinawa Islands during the Sanzan Period

Various polities of the Okinawa Islands were unified as the Ryūkyū Kingdom in 1429, a tributary state of Ming Imperial China. The kingdom conquered the Miyako and Yaeyama Islands. At its peak, it also subjected the Amami Islands to its rule. In 1609, Shimazu Tadatsune, Lord of Satsuma, invaded the Ryūkyū Kingdom with a fleet of 13 junks and 2,500 samurai, thereby establishing suzerainty over the islands. They faced little opposition from the Ryukyuans, who lacked any significant military capabilities, and who were ordered by King Shō Nei to surrender rather than to suffer the loss of precious lives. After that, the kings of the Ryukyus paid tribute to the Japanese shōgun as well as to the Chinese emperor. During this period, Ryukyu kings were selected by a Japanese clan, unbeknownst to the Chinese, who believed the Ryukyus to be a loyal tributary. In 1655, the tributary relations between Ryukyu and Qing were formally approved by the shogunate. In 1874, the Ryukyus terminated tribute relations with China.

In 1872, the Japanese government established the Ryukyu han under the jurisdiction of the Foreign Ministry. In 1875, jurisdiction over the Ryukyus changed from the Foreign Ministry to the Home Ministry. In 1879, the Meiji government announced the abolishment of the Ryukyu han, establishing it as Okinawa Prefecture and forcing the Ryukyu king to move to Tokyo. Although China’s diplomatic protests to Japanese rule over the Ryukyus had largely gone dormant after 1880, the signing of the Treaty of Shimonoseki after its 1895 defeat in the First Sino-Japanese War is typically regarded as the final, de facto close of the dispute.

American military control over Okinawa began in 1945 with the establishment of the United States Military Government of the Ryukyu Islands, which became the United States Civil Administration of the Ryukyu Islands in 1950. Also in 1950, the Interim Ryukyus Advisory Council (臨時琉球諮詢委員会, Rinji Ryūkyū Shijun Iinkai) was formed, which evolved into the Ryukyu Provisional Central Government (琉球臨時中央政府, Ryūkyū Rinji Chūō Seifu) in 1951. In 1952, the U.S. was formally granted administrative rights over Ryukyu Islands south of 29°N latitude, and other Pacific islands, under the San Francisco Peace Treaty between the Allied Powers and Japan. The Ryukyu Provisional Central Government then became the Government of the Ryukyu Islands which existed from 1952 to 1972. Administrative rights reverted to Japan in 1972, under the 1971 Okinawa Reversion Agreement.

Today, numerous issues arise from Okinawan history. Some Ryukyuans and some Japanese feel that people from the Ryukyus are different from the majority Yamato people. Some natives of the Ryukyus claim that the central government is discriminating against the islanders by allowing so many American soldiers to be stationed on bases in Okinawa with a minimal presence on the mainland. Additionally, there is some discussion of secession from Japan. As the territorial dispute between China and Japan over the Senkaku Islands intensified in the early 21st century, Chinese Communist Party-backed scholars published essays calling for a reexamination of Japan's sovereignty over the Ryukyus. In 2013, The New York Times described the comments by said scholars as well as military figures as appearing to constitute "a semiofficial campaign in China to question Japanese rule of the islands", noting that "almost all the voices in China pressing the Okinawa issue are affiliated in some way with the government". Taiwan also claims the Senkaku islands but made it clear on multiple occasions that they will not work with China over the Senkaku Islands dispute.

Many popular singers and musical groups come from Okinawa Prefecture. These include the groups Speed and Orange Range, as well as solo singers Namie Amuro and Gackt, among many others.

==== Historical description of the "Loo-Choo" islands ====
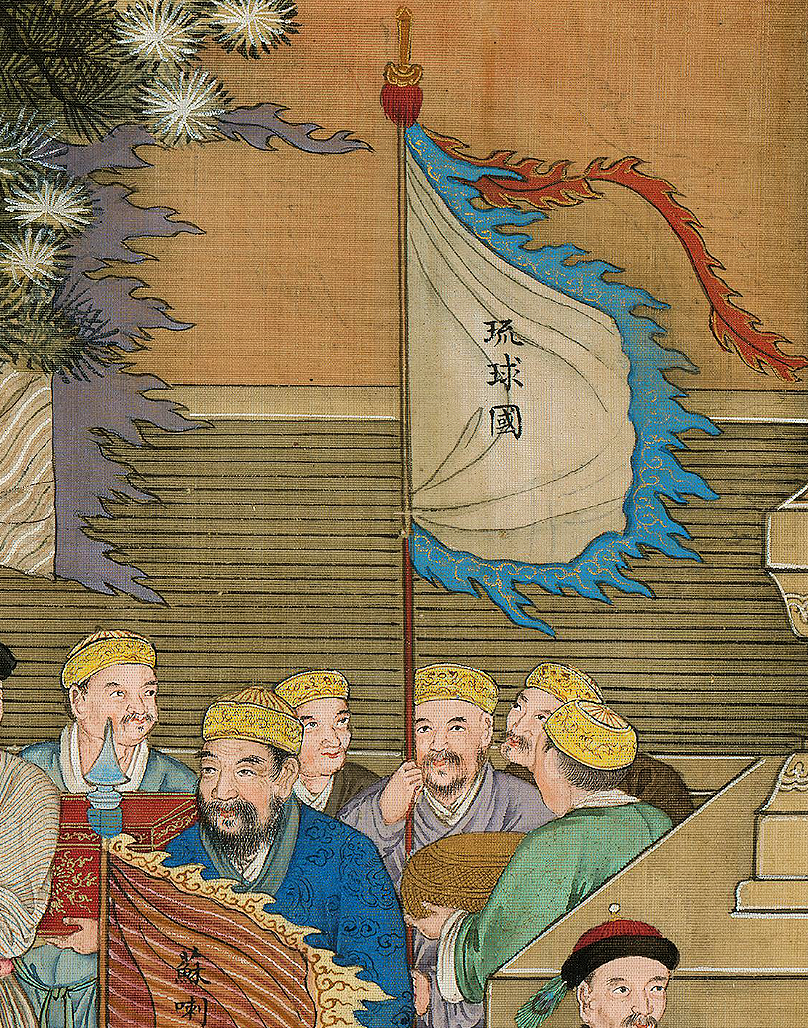
Ryukyu delegates in Ten Thousand Nations Coming to Pay Tribute (1761), which depicts foreign delegations in Beijing

The islands were described by Hayashi Shihei in Sangoku Tsūran Zusetsu, which was published in 1785.

An article in the 1878 edition of the Globe Encyclopaedia of Universal Information describes the islands:

Loo-Choo, Lu-Tchu, or Lieu-Kieu, a group of thirty-six islands stretching from Japan to Formosa, in 26°–27°40′ N. lat., 126°10′–129°5′ E. long., and tributary to Japan. The largest, Tsju San ('middle island'), is about 60 miles long and 12 [miles] broad; others are Sannan in the [south] and Sanbok in the [north]. Nawa, the chief port of Tsju San, is open to foreign commerce. The islands enjoy a magnificent climate and are highly cultivated and very productive. Among the productions are tea, rice, sugar, tobacco, camphor, fruits, and silk. The principal manufactures are cotton, paper, porcelain, and lacquered ware. The people, who are small, seem a link between the Chinese and Japanese.

== Population ==
=== Ryukyuan native people ===
Prior to the Meiji Restoration, the Ryukyu Kingdom, then under the control of the Satsuma Domain, was required by its Shimazu overlords to implement "de-Japanization" policies, including prohibiting the use of Japanese-style names and restricting contact with the rest of Japan, which is considered to have accelerated the formation of a unique local cultural identity.

During the Meiji Period, Ryukyuan ethnic identity, tradition, culture and language were suppressed by the Meiji government, which sought to assimilate the Ryukyuan people as Japanese (Yamato). Many ethnic Japanese migrated to the Ryukyu Islands and mixed with the Ryukyuan people.

The residents of the island chain are Japanese citizens. Labeling them as Japanese poses no problem with regard to the Ōsumi Islands and Tokara Islands in the north, but there are problems about the ethnicity of the residents of the central and southern groups of the island chain.

Many scholars from outside the archipelago who recognize shared heritage among the native population of the Amami, Okinawa, Miyako and Yaeyama Islands label them as Ryukyuans (琉球人, Ryūkyūjin). But the residents of these Ryukyu Islands do not generally identify themselves as such, although they share the notion that they are somewhat different from mainland Japanese, whom they call "Yamato" or "Naicha". They usually express self-identity as the native of a particular island. Their identity can extend to an island and then to Japan as a whole, but rarely to intermediate regions.

For example, the people of Okinawa Island refer to themselves as Uchinaanchu (ウチナーンチュ, people of Okinawa) and the people of Okinoerabujima in the Amami Islands call themselves the Erabunchu (エラブンチュ, people of Erabu), while referring to the Okinawans as Uchinaanchu or Naafanchu (ナーファンチュ, people of Naha), as they consider themselves distinct from the Okinawans. Other terms used include Amaminchu (アマミンチュ) and Shimanchu (シマンチュ) in the Amami Islands, Yeeyamabitu (イェーヤマビトゥ) in the Yaeyama Islands, Yunnunchu (ユンヌンチュ) on Yoronjima and Myaakunchuu (ミャークンチュー) in the Miyako Islands.

This highly localized identity may be rooted in the region's internal historical conflicts, including the Shuri government's military conquests of the outer islands, its imposition of severe poll taxes, and the linguistic barriers among the various island groups.

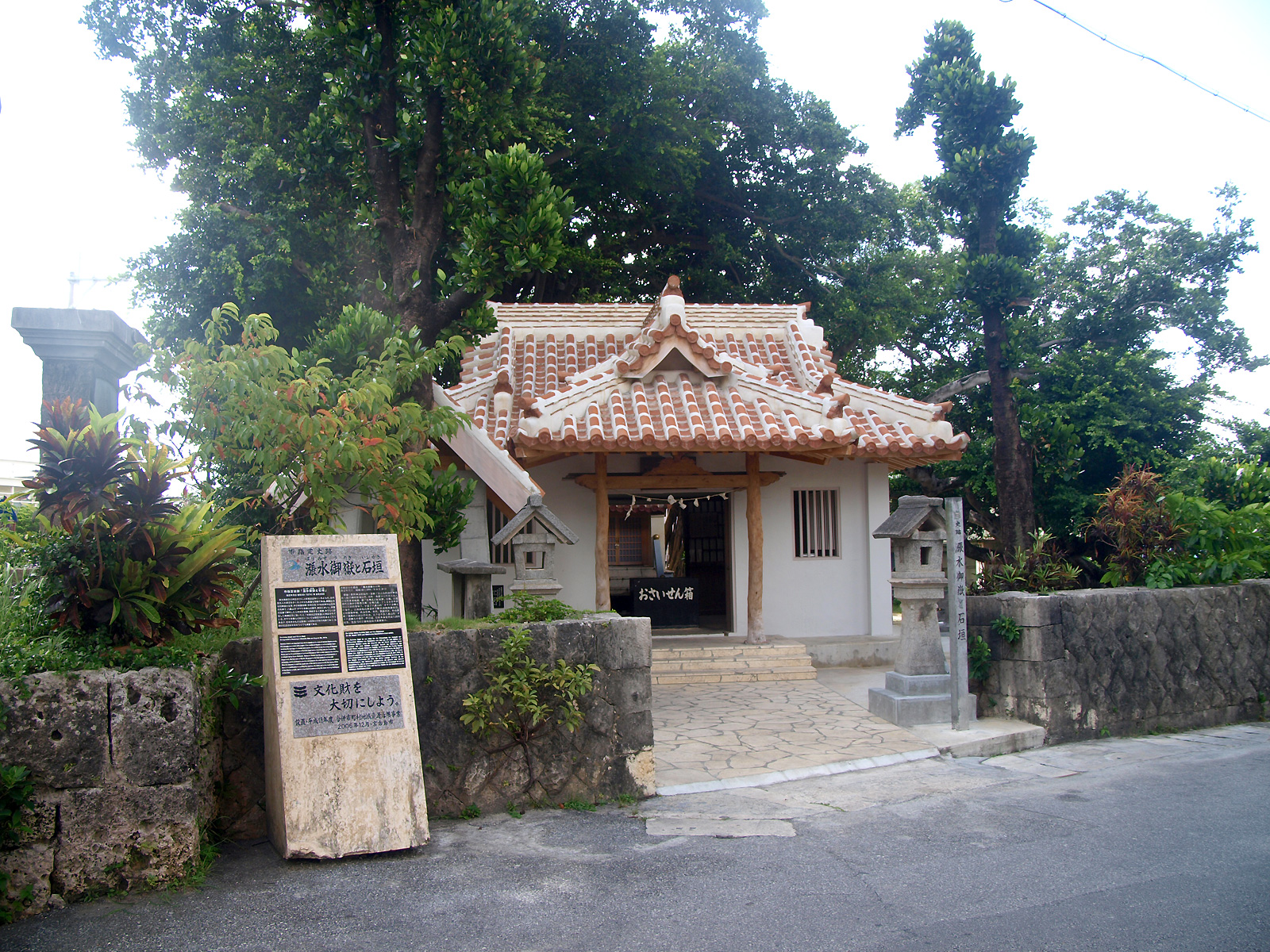
Harimizu utaki (Harimizu Shrine), a Ryukyuan shrine in Miyakojima, Okinawa Prefecture

=== Religion ===
The indigenous Ryukyuan religion is generally characterized by ancestor worship (more accurately termed "ancestor respect") and the respecting of relationships between the living, the dead, and the gods and spirits of the natural world. Some of its beliefs are indicative of its ancient animistic roots, such as those concerning local spirits and many other beings classified between gods and humans.

Ryukyuan religious practice has been influenced by Chinese religions (Taoism, Confucianism, and folk beliefs), Buddhism and Japanese Shinto.

Roman Catholics are pastorally served by their own Roman Catholic Diocese of Naha, which was founded in 1947 as the "Apostolic Administration of Okinawa and the Southern Islands".

== Ecology ==
=== Biogeographic boundaries ===
The Watase Line marks a major biogeographic boundary. The Ōsumi Islands north of the line belong to the Palearctic realm while the Amami islands south of it are at the northern limit of the Indomalayan realm. A deep undersea canyon, the Tokara Gap (吐噶喇ギャップ), lies to the east of the Tokara islands, but where the line crosses the island chain is disputed. It has been "placed between Akusekijima and Kodakarajima islands of the Tokara Archipelago", but there is variation throughout the Tokaras, with multiple inter-island gaps having similar influence. Species diffusion among the Tokara islands is thought to have been over sea, not via land bridge, and their faunal composition also depends on other factors such as island size.

The Miyake Line (三宅線) for insects lies between Kyūshū and the Ōsumi island groups, and the Hachisuka Line (蜂須賀線) for birds between the Okinawa and Miyako groups.

=== Yakushima ===
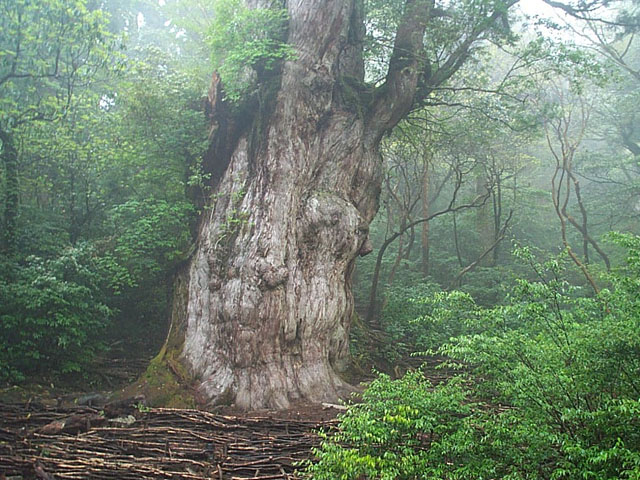
Jōmon Sugi in Yakushima

Yakushima in Ōsumi is the southern limit of the Palearctic realm. It features millennium-old cedar trees. The island is part of Kirishima-Yaku National Park and was designated as World Heritage Site by UNESCO in 1993.

=== Amami, Okinawa, Miyako, and Yaeyama ===
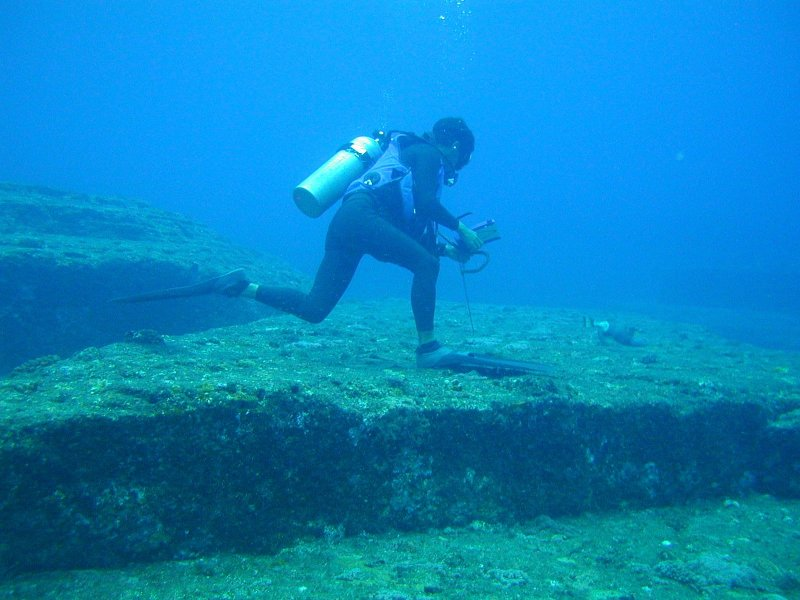
The Yonaguni Monument, a rock formation along the south coast of Yonaguni Island

The south of Watase's Line is recognized by ecologists as a distinct subtropical moist broadleaf forest ecoregion. The flora and fauna of the islands have much in common with Taiwan, the Philippines, and Southeast Asia, and are part of the Indomalayan realm.

The coral reefs are among the World Wildlife Fund's Global 200 ecoregions. The reefs are endangered by sedimentation and eutrophication, which result from agriculture as well as fishing.

The coral-reef related porcelaneous larger foraminiferal species Borelis matsudai Bassi and Iryu, 2023 (Alveolinoidea, Borelinae) is based on specimens discovered in present-day shallow-water sediments from Sekisei Lagoon, southern Ryukyu Islands (Japan). This is the northernmost record of the genus Borelis in the western Indo-Pacific Warm Pool.

Shimenawa okuyamae Bassi and Iryu, 2026 and Yorishiro morii Bassi and Iryu, 2026 are two new genera and species of tubular foraminifera. These species have been described from approximately 4000-year-old nuclei of deep-water acervulinid macroids collected from the shelf off Kikai Jima. Macroids form extensive beds on mobile sandy and gravelly bioclastic carbonate sediments at water depths of 75–97 m.

Mammals endemic to the islands include the Amami Rabbit, the Ryukyu flying fox, the Ryukyu long-tailed giant rat, the Tokudaia spp. of the Ryukyu spiny rats, the Ryukyu shrew and perhaps the Iriomote cat.

Birds found in the Ryukyus include the Amami woodcock, the Izu thrush, the Amami thrush, the Japanese paradise flycatcher, the Ryukyu flycatcher, the Okinawa rail (yanbaru kuina), the Lidth's Jay, the Ruddy kingfisher, the Ryukyu minivet, the Ryukyu robin, the Ryūkyū scops owl, the Japanese wood pigeon, Amami woodpecker and the Okinawa woodpecker.

Approximately one half of the amphibian species of the islands are endemic. Endemic amphibians include the sword-tail newt, the Hyla hallowellii, the Holst's frog, the Otton frog, the Ishikawa's frog, the Odorrana splendida, the Ryukyu tip-nosed frog, and the Namiye's frog. Other rare amphibians include Anderson's crocodile newt and the Kampira Falls frog.

Various venomous species of viper known locally as habu also inhabit the Ryukyus, including Protobothrops elegans, Protobothrops flavoviridis, Protobothrops tokarensis, and Ovophis okinavensis. Other snakes native to the Ryukyus are Achalinus werneri, Achalinus formosanus, Elaphe carinata, Elaphe taeniura, Cyclophiops semicarinatus, Cyclophiops herminae, Dinodon semicarinatum, Lycodon rufozonatus, Calamaria pfefferri, Amphiesma pryeri, Calliophis japonicus, Laticauda semifasciata, and Hydrophis ornatus.

Lizards native to the islands include Kishinoue's giant skink, Kuroiwa's ground gecko, Japalura polygonata, Plestiodon stimpsonii, Plestiodon marginatus, Scincella boettgeri, Scincella vandenburghi, Ateuchosaurus pellopleurus, Cryptoblepharus boutonii nigropunctatus, Apeltonotus dorsalis, and Takydromus toyamai.

Subspecies of the Chinese box turtle and the yellow pond turtle are native to the islands, as is the Ryukyu black-breasted leaf turtle.

== See also ==
- Nanpō Islands
- Ryukyu Trench
- Tanegashima Space Center
