= Tane Province =

Former province of Japan

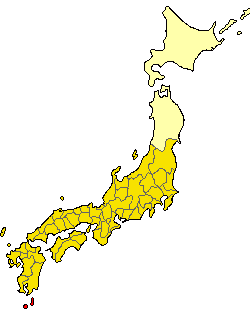
Northern Tane Province

Tane Province (多禰国, Tane no Kuni) was an old province of Japan in the area of Kagoshima Prefecture, roughly corresponding to Kumage Subprefecture.

== History ==
Kofun burial mounds on Tanegashima and two very old Shinto shrines on Yakushima suggest that these islands were the southern border of the Yamato state.

Annals of the Nara period regard Tane-no-kuni as the name for all the Ryukyu Islands, including Tanegashima and Yakushima.

- 675 (Temmu 3): Ambassadors of "Tane no kuni" were received in the Japanese court.
- 702 (Taihō 2): The Shoku Nihongi records, "Satsuma and Tane broke the relation and disobey to the king's order. So (the government) sent an army, conquered them, counted the population, and placed the officials." This marks the establishment of the Satsuma and Tane Provinces.
- 824 (Tenchō 1): Tane was annexed to Ōsumi Province.

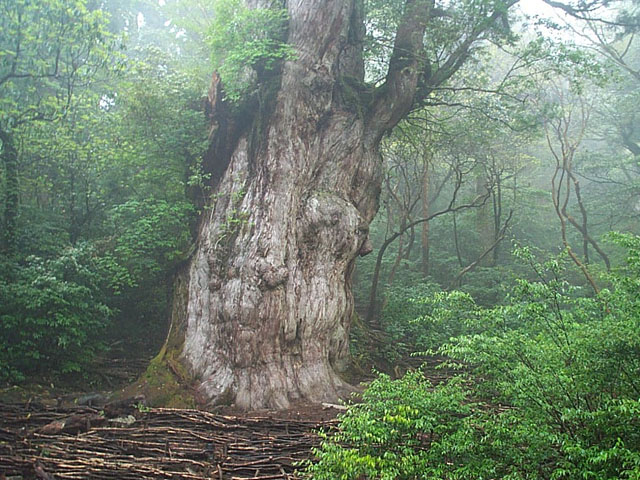
Jōmonsugi on Yakushima, Japan

== Other websites ==
Media related to Tane Province at Wikimedia Commons

- Murdoch's map of provinces, 1903
