= Kuroshima (Kagoshima) =

Island within Satsunan Islands

Native name: Japanese: 黒島
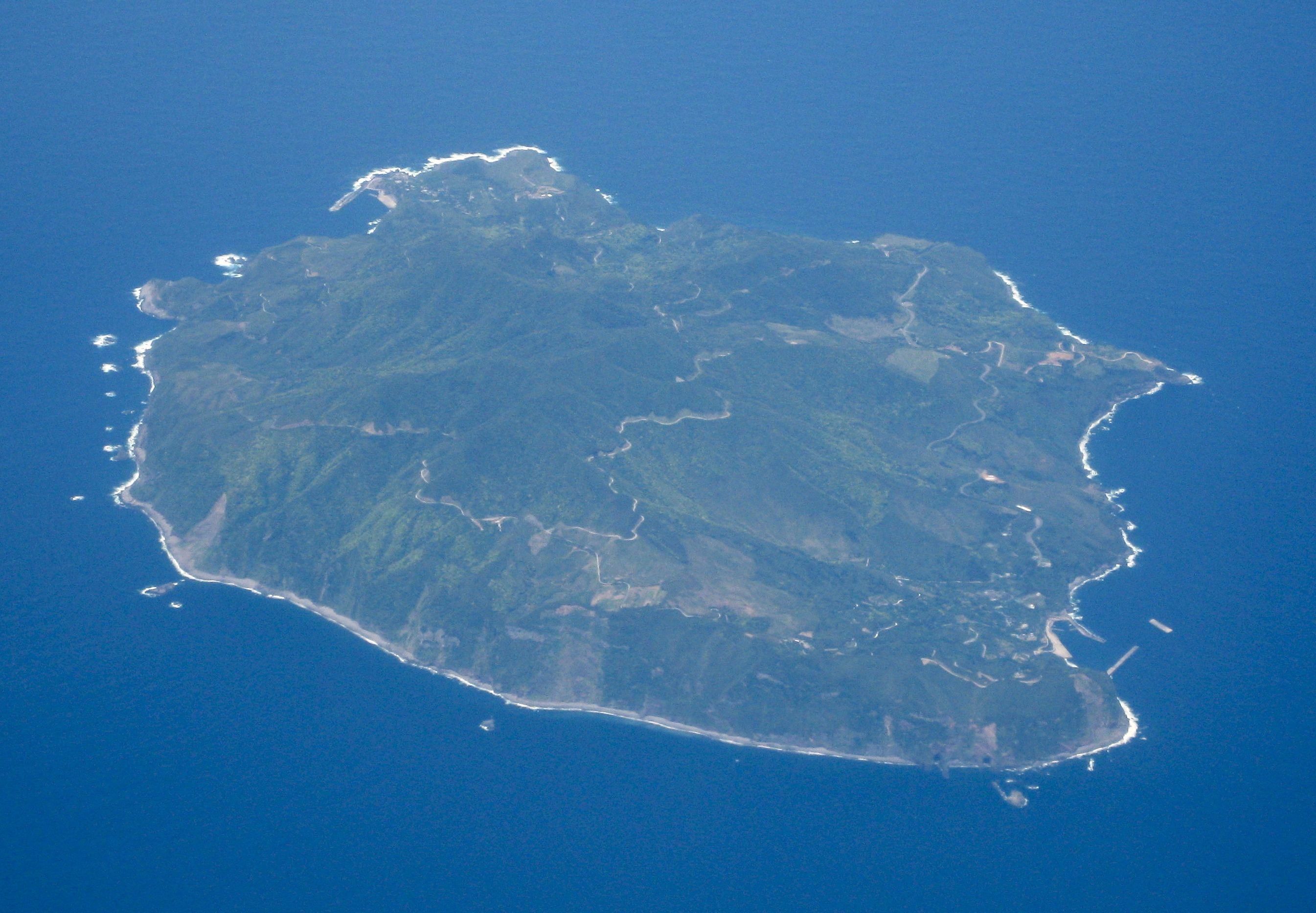
- Aerial photograph of Kuroshima

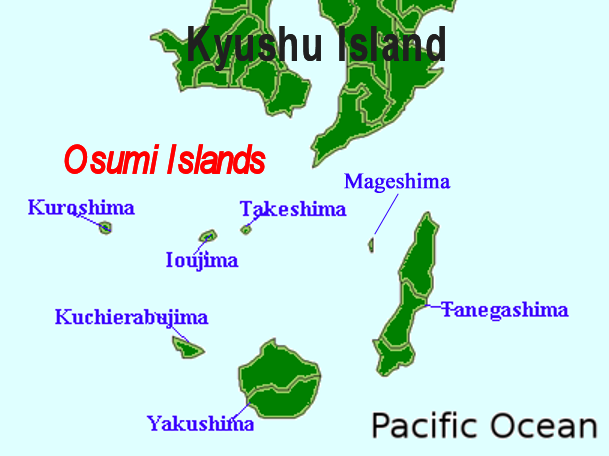

Geography
- Location: East China Sea
- Coordinates: 30°50′5.6″N 129°57′20.7″E
- Archipelago: Ōsumi Islands
- Area: 15.37 km^{2} (5.93 sq mi)
- Coastline: 71.7 km (44.55 mi)
- Highest elevation: 621.9 m (2040.4 ft)

Administration
- Japan
- Prefectures: Kagoshima
- Village: Mishima

Demographics
- Population: 199 (2010)
- Pop. density: 12.94/km^{2} (33.51/sq mi)
- Ethnic groups: Japanese

Kuroshima (黒島), is one of the Satsunan Islands, usually classed with the Ōsumi Islands, belonging to Kagoshima Prefecture, Japan. The island, 15.37 km^{2} in area, has a population of 199 people. The island can only be reached by ferry service to the city of Kagoshima on the mainland, as there is no airport. Travel time is about 6 hours. The islanders are dependent mainly on fishing, agriculture and seasonal tourism.

== Geography ==
Kuroshima is the westernmost of the Ōsumi islands, and is located 110 kilometres (59 nmi) south of Kagoshima. The island is of volcanic origin, and has an area of approximately 15.37 square kilometres (5.93 sq mi). The highest elevation on the island is 620 metres (2,030 ft). above sea level.

Its climate is classified as subtropical, with a rainy season from May through September. The island is heavily forested.

== History ==
Per local folklore, the island was one of the havens of the defeated Heike clan after they lost the Genpei War against the Minamoto clan. This is reflected in many local customs, and the remains of late Heian period and early Kamakura period fortifications. During the Edo period, Kuroshima was part of Satsuma Domain and was administered as part of Kawabe District. In 1896, the island was transferred to the administrative control of Ōshima District, Kagoshima, and from 1911 was part of the village of Toshima, Kagoshima. From 1946-1952, the southern seven islands in the Toshima group belonging to the Tokara archipelago came under the administration of the United States as part of the Provisional Government of Northern Ryukyu Islands; however, since Kuroshima is located north of 30 degrees North, it remained Japanese territory during this time, and came under the administration of the village of Mishima in Kagoshima Prefecture.

In 1979, the modern novelist Sawako Ariyoshi wrote a novel set on Kuroshima.
