= Takeshima (Kagoshima) =

Island within Satsunan Islands

Native name: Japanese: 竹島
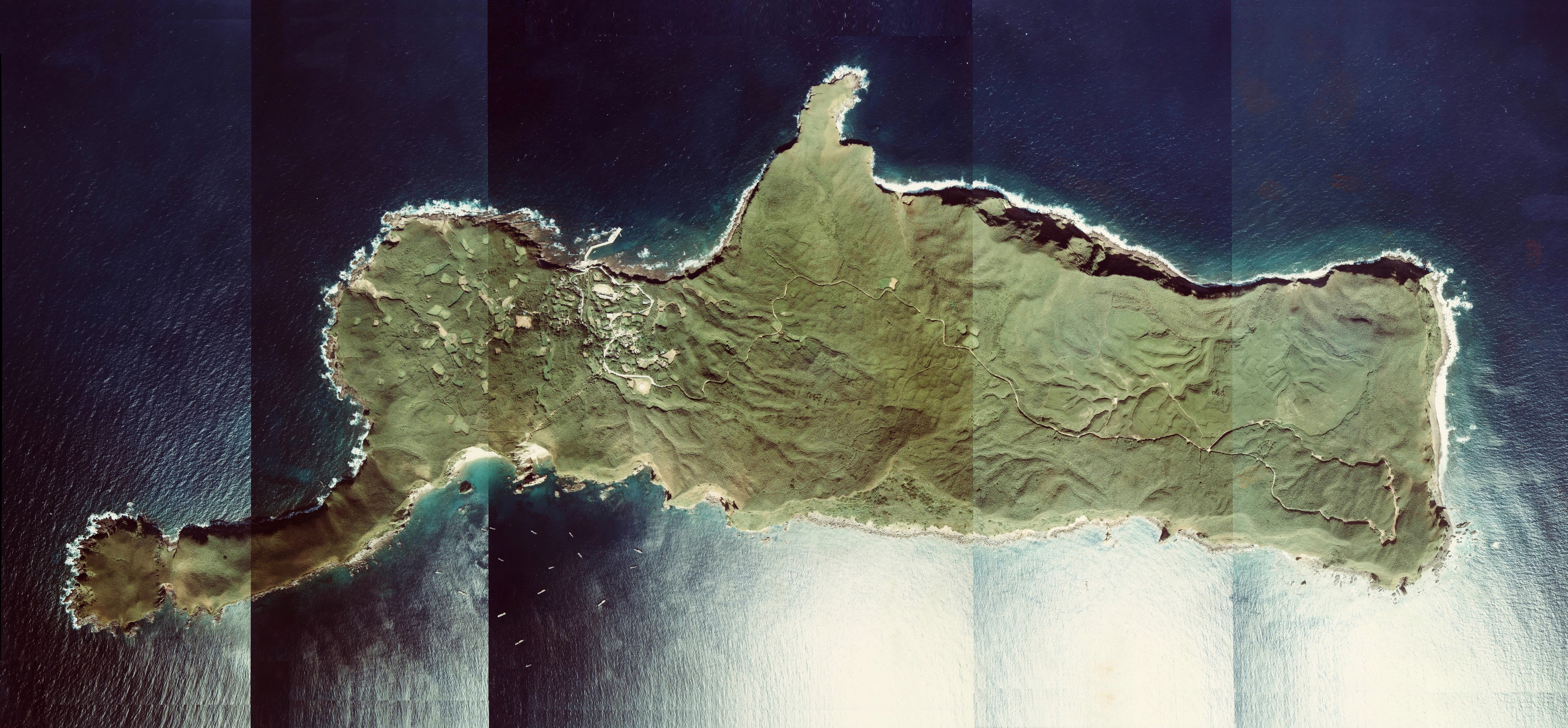
- Takeshima Island Kagoshima Prefecture Aerial photograph.1977

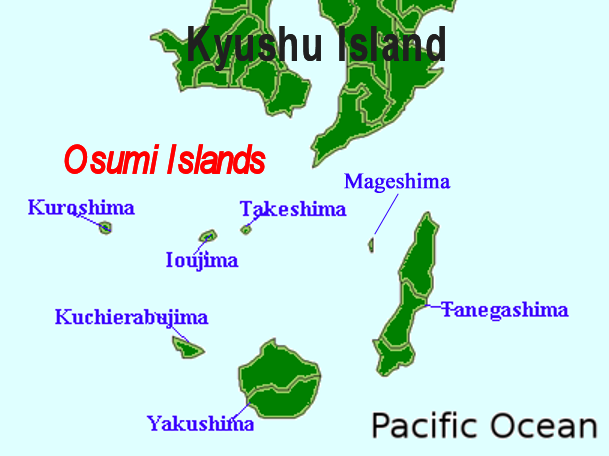

Geography
- Location: East China Sea
- Coordinates: 30°48′50″N 130°25′2.1″E
- Archipelago: Ōsumi Islands
- Area: 4.2 km^{2} (1.6 sq mi)
- Coastline: 12.8 km (7.95 mi)
- Highest elevation: 220 m (720 ft)
- Highest point: Magomeyama

Administration
- Japan
- Prefectures: Kagoshima
- Village: Mishima

Demographics
- Population: 78 (2010)
- Pop. density: 18.57/km^{2} (48.1/sq mi)
- Ethnic groups: Japanese

Takeshima (竹島), is one of the Ryukyu Islands, usually classed with the Ōsumi Islands belonging to Kagoshima Prefecture, Japan. The island, 4.2 km^{2} in area, has a population of 78 persons. The island can only be reached by ferry service to the city of Kagoshima on the mainland, as there is no airport. Travel time is about 3 hours. The islanders are dependent mainly on fishing, agriculture and seasonal tourism.

== Geography ==
Takeshima is one of the Ōsumi islands, and is located 94 kilometres (51 nmi) south of Kagoshima. The island is of volcanic origin, being adjacent to the northern rim of the Kikai Caldera and predating the Akahoya eruption. It has an area of approximately 4.2 square kilometres (1.6 sq mi). The highest elevation on the island is 220 metres (720 ft) above sea level, but most of the island is flat. Most of the coastline has steep cliffs.

Its climate is classified as subtropical, with a rainy season from May through September. The island is heavily forested with stands of Ryukyu bamboo.

== History ==
Jōmon-period remains have been found on Takeshima, indicating continuous occupation for at least the past 3000 years. Per local folklore, the island was one of the havens of the defeated Heike clan after they lost the Genpei War against the Minamoto clan. This is reflected in many local customs, and the remains of late Heian period and early Kamakura period fortifications. During the Edo period, Takeshima was part of Satsuma Domain and was administered as part of Kawabe District. In 1896, the island was transferred to the administrative control of Ōshima District, Kagoshima, and from 1911 was part of the village of Toshima, Kagoshima. From 1946 to 1952, the southern seven islands in the group forming the Tokara archipelago came under the administration of the United States as part of the Provisional Government of Northern Ryukyu Islands; however, since Takeshima is located north of 30 degrees North, it remained Japanese territory during this time, and came under the administration of the village of Mishima, Kagoshima Prefecture.
