= Kagoshima dialect =

Japanese dialect

Kagoshima Japanese
- Satsugū, Satsuma
- Pronunciation: [kaɡoʔma] or [kaɡomma]
- Native to: Japan
- Region: Kagoshima Prefecture and Miyazaki Prefecture
- Language family: Japonic: Japanese; Kyūshū; Kagoshima Japanese
- Dialects: Satsuma; Southern Satsuma; North-Western Satsuma; Ōsumi; Morokata; Koshikijima; Tanegashima; Yakushima; Tokara
- Writing system: Japanese, Latin

Language codes
- ISO 639-3: –
- Glottolog: sats1241
- Linguasphere: 45-CAA-ah
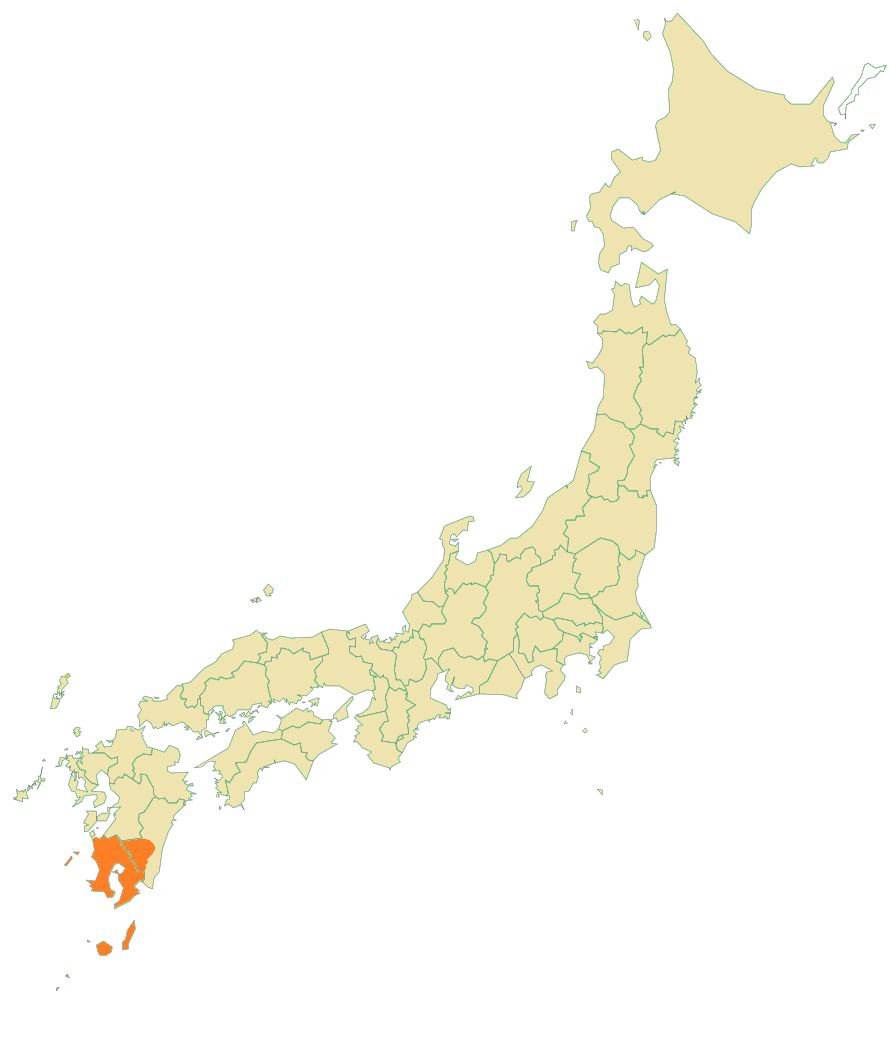
- Satsugū dialect area (orange)

The Satsugū dialect (薩隅方言, Satsugū Hōgen), often referred to as the Kagoshima dialect (鹿児島弁, Kagoshima-ben, Kagomma-ben, Kago'ma-ben, Kagoima-ben), is a group of dialects or dialect continuum of the Japanese language spoken mainly within the area of the former Ōsumi and Satsuma provinces now incorporated into the southwestern prefecture of Kagoshima. It may also be collectively referred to as the Satsuma dialect (薩摩方言 Satsuma Hōgen or 薩摩弁 Satsuma-ben), owing to both the prominence of the Satsuma Province and the region of the Satsuma Domain which spanned the former Japanese provinces of Satsuma, Ōsumi and the southwestern part of Hyūga. The Satsugū dialect is commonly cited for its mutual unintelligibility to even its neighboring Kyūshū variants, prompting the Max Planck Institute for Evolutionary Anthropology to classify it as a distinct language in the Japanesic branch in its Glottolog database. It shares over three-quarters of the Standard Japanese vocabulary corpus and some areal features of Kyūshū.

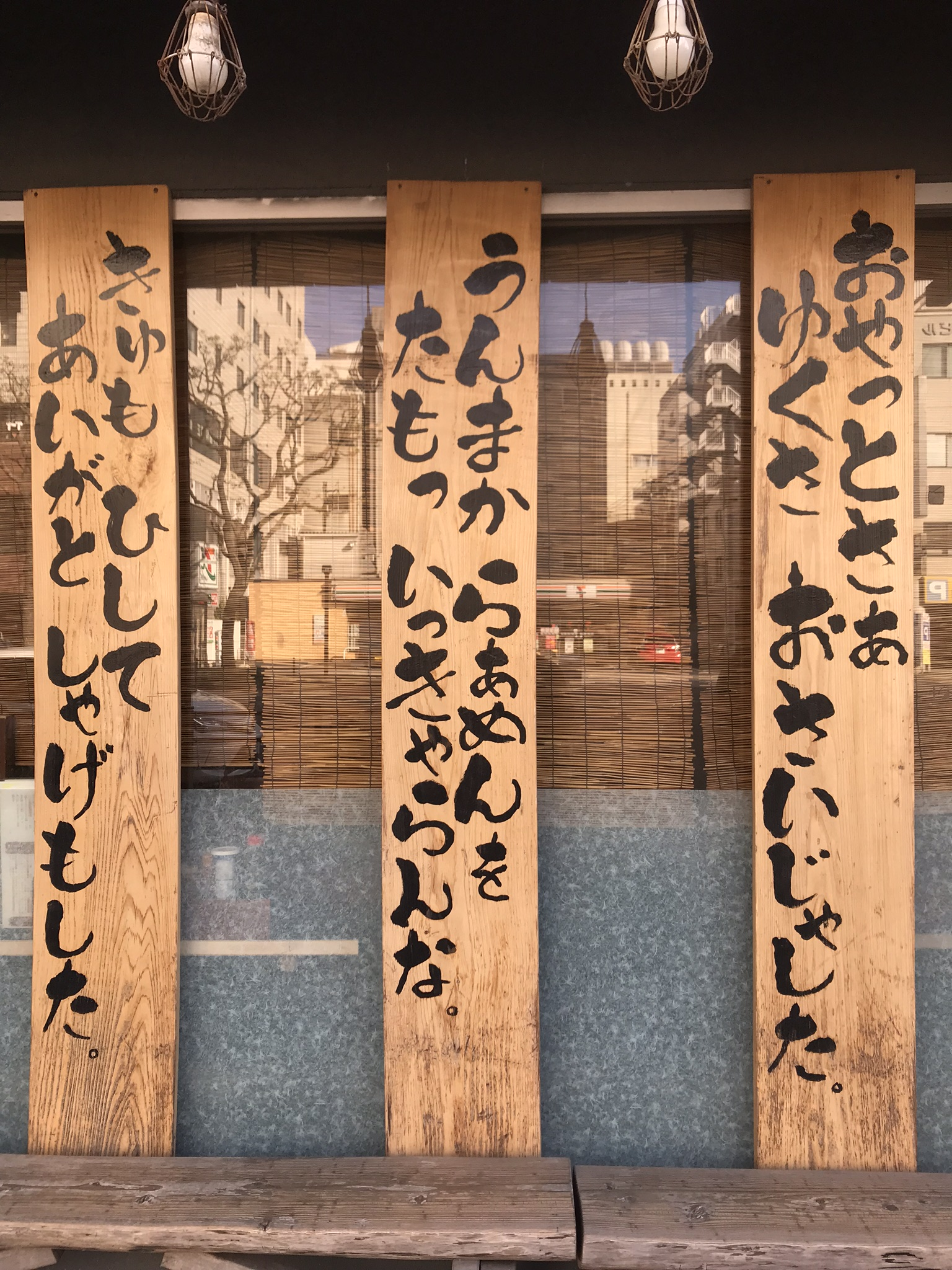
An example of Kagoshima dialect

== Distribution and subdialects ==
Traditional division: ■ Satsuma, ■ Ōsumi, ■ Morokata ■ Other (Regions approximated)

The boundaries of the Satsugū dialect are traditionally defined as the former region controlled by the Satsuma Domain, which primarily encompassed the main portion of the Kagoshima Prefecture, located in the southern part of Japan's Kyushu Island, and a small part of the Miyazaki Prefecture to the East. For precision, this area could be further separated into three distinct branches of the Satsugū dialect: the Satsuma dialect spoken in western Kagoshima, the Ōsumi dialect spoken in eastern Kagoshima, and the Morokata dialect spoken in the southwesternmost part of the Miyazaki Prefecture.

However, the dialectal differences are much more localized making this three-way distinction superficial. Variations in pronunciation, words, expressions and grammatical constructions may occur between neighboring cities, towns and villages, with peripheral islands exhibiting greater divergence due to isolation. As such, Satsugū may be considered a dialect continuum, differing only slightly between areas that are geographically close, and gradually decreasing in mutual intelligibility as the distances become greater. By this token, all major areas of the mainland—including Satsuma, Ōsumi, Morokata, and possibly also a small fraction of southern Kumamoto—may form a single, closely related dialect branch with no precise boundaries due to continuous contact between the regions. Conversely, the peripheral islands are easier to distinguish and seemingly form three distinct, but related clades associated with the proximity of the islands. These would be: the Koshikijima Islands to the West, the Ōsumi Islands directly to the South (such as Tanegashima, Yakushima, and Kuchinoerabu), and the Tokara Islands in the very far South. The variants spoken on the Amami Islands are not considered part of the Satsugū dialect, but are rather part of the Northern Ryukyuan language branch.

Further subdivisions are possible for all areas, and a classification tree of the general Satsugū sub-dialects might look something like the following (areas in parentheses indicate approximate regions):

- Satsugū (Southern Kyushu)
  - Mainland Kagoshima
    - Satsuma (Western Kagoshima)
      - Hokusatsu (North-Western Satsuma)
        - Izumi-Akune (and surrounding areas)
        - Nagashima-Shishijima
      - Central Satsuma (most of Kagoshima, especially in and around Kagoshima City)
      - Southern Satsuma
        - South Satsuma Peninsula (Makurazaki)
        - Western Ōsumi Islands (Kuroshima, Takeshima, Iōjima)
    - Ōsumi (Eastern Kagoshima)
    - Morokata (South-Western Miyazaki)
  - Koshikijima Islands
    - North (Kami-Koshikijima)
    - Central (Naka-Koshikijima)
    - South (Shimo-Koshikijima)
  - Eastern Ōsumi Islands
    - Tanegashima
      - Northern Tanegashima (Nishinoomote)
      - Southern Tanegashima (Nakatane, Minamitane)
    - Yakushima
      - Yakushima Island
      - Kuchinoerabu Island
  - Tokara Islands
    - Northern Tokara (Kuchinoshima, Nakanoshima)
    - Central Tokara (Tairajima, Suwanosejima)
    - Southern Tokara (Takarajima)

== History ==
Historically, Satsuma had maintained an influential control over the trading routes that bounded the Kyūshū island to the Ryukyu Islands, Mainland Japan and by extension, the rest of the world. Its commercial importance to the rest of Japan was reflected in the adoption of such terms as Satsuma imo (sweet potato), Satsuma yaki (Satsuma styled pottery), and Satsuma jisho (Japanese-English dictionary). Similar terms such as satsuma ware and satsuma (orange) were also, along with several words from the dialect itself such as soy (Satsugū: そい~しょい [soj~ɕoj]), later incorporated into the English language.

During the Edo period, the Sakoku Edict of 1635 led to the strict seclusion of Japan from the outside world. However, the Satsuma Domain, which spanned the provinces of Satsuma, Ōsumi, and the southwestern part of Hyūga, maintained trade relations with neighboring countries by using the Ryukyu Islands as a conduit, and by advocating that the islands distinctively formed an independent kingdom, even though in reality the Satsuma Domain had conquered the Ryūkyū Kingdom in 1609. The invasion of Ryukyu had assured Satsuma's place as one of the most powerful feudal domains in Tokugawa Japan, and would also set a precedent for Satsuma as a vital role in later overthrowing the Tokugawa shogunate and initiating the Meiji Restoration.

In the Fall of 1729, a ship from Satsuma bound for the province of Osaka drifted off course and ended up landing at Cape Lopatka, in Russia. Upon arrival, the crew were attacked by a group of cossacks led by Andreï Chtinnikov. Out of seventeen members, only two survived: a trader named Soza, and the pilot's son and apprentice, Gonza. The two were sent across the country to the capital of Saint Petersburg, where they were received in audience by Empress Anna Ivanovna, and later baptized in the Russian Orthodox Church. They went on afterwards to teach Japanese, and helped establish the first Japanese-language school in Russia. Gonza, who was also fluent in Russian, wrote and edited a number of books about the Japanese language, using the Cyrillic alphabet to transliterate words. These transliterations provide not only the oldest record of the Satsugū dialect, but have also been cited for their comprehensive evidence of the history, phonology and variability of the Japanese language.

The flag of the Satsuma Domain

When Japan started slowly opening up to the rest of the world in the mid-19th century, Satsuma was one of the first domains to embrace Western culture and methods. However, tension quickly grew between the increasing invasiveness of Westerners in southern Japan. When the Namamugi Incident of September 14, 1862 occurred, political and ideological differences between the United Kingdom and Satsuma Province sparked outrage and quickly boiled into the Anglo-Satsuma War. Satsuma would ultimately lose, leaving way to increasing dissatisfaction with the Tokugawan government. The Meiji government would then take its place after the Tokugawan government was overthrown in the Boshin War. However, corruption in the Meiji government, which it originally helped establish, would then give birth to the Satsuma Rebellion of 1877. Despite their numbers, the Satsuma Domain was rapidly overpowered, and its defeat eventually resulted in the end of its dominance in Japan's southern sphere. The Satsugū dialect, which had a predominant role in samurai affairs and equally the police hierarchy system throughout Japan, steadily declined in influence following this defeat.

In July 1871, the Japanese domain system was abolished. The region of the Satsuma Domain mostly became part of the Kagoshima Prefecture, while a small portion of its northeastern region was incorporated into the Miyazaki Prefecture. The abolition of the domain system also brought forth standardized education. However, as Kagoshima was already an uncontested part of mainland Japan, assimilation through education was not a priority as it had been in Okinawa. Though contrary to Okinawa, the Satsuma clan sought to preserve the uniqueness of its own dialect. As such, the Satsugū dialect persisted.

When the United States later took control of Japan's South in World War II, Japanese officials tactically sought to exploit Kagoshima's more northern position, its advancement in shipping technology, and most notably the Satsugū dialect's mutual unintelligibility as a method of cryptographic communication between Japan and Germany. Dozens of international phone calls had been made using the Satsugū dialect, and despite being able to eavesdrop on the conversations being sent back and forth, the United States was unable to determine the language spoken. The use of the Satsugū dialect to further obfuscate communication during both the Second World War and possibly the period of the earlier Satsuma Domain has led to a popular belief that Satsugū was created as an artificial language and promoted for the purpose of being unintelligible in order to thwart enemy spies.

== Current status ==
Like other Japanese regional dialects, the traditional dialects of Kagoshima are now being displaced by standard Japanese as a consequence of standardized education and centralized media, especially among the younger generation. As a result, many of the features that so characterize the dialects are now disappearing. In terms of phonology, for example, the palatalized variant of the vowel /e/ is now being phased out, as is the retention of the labialized consonants /kʷ ɡʷ/. More prominently, many of the phonological processes, such as vowel coalescence and high vowel deletion, as well as most grammatical constructions and words that are unique to these dialects, are being completely uprooted by their standard forms.

Despite this, many popular words and expressions continue to persist today, even among younger speakers. Examples pulled from a research survey include 気張いやんせ kibai-yanse "please do your best", おやっとさあ oyattosaa "thank you for your work", あにょ anyo "older brother", げんね genne "shy", and がっつい gattsui "exactly", among numerous others. The same research also revealed through interviews that, while people generally felt a positive vibe to hearing the traditional dialect spoken, those under the age of 40 expressed some difficulty understanding. One woman in her sixties was quoted saying: "There are now very few people who can use the true dialect".

Efforts to document the dialects or promote them through cultural means are few, though some notable dictionaries on the mainland Kagoshima dialect have been published, such as the Academic Primer on the Kagoshima Dialect (かごしま弁入門講座, Kagoshima-ben nyūmon kōza), while others can be accessed online. A few manga written in an admixture of the dialect and standard Japanese, such as Gattsui koi mo Kagoshima-ben (がっついコイも鹿児島弁) and Proverbs of Satsuma (薩摩のことわざ, Satsuma no kotowaza) by Chihiro Ōyoshi (大吉千明) have also been published.

== Phonology ==
=== Vowels ===
	Front	Central	Back
Close	i		u
Mid	e̞ ~ ʲe̞		o
Open		a	

All of the Kagoshima dialects contrast the following five vowels: /i/, /e/, /a/, /o/ and /u/. In terms of pronunciation, the Kagoshima dialects pattern with other far-western Honshu and Kyushu dialects, wherein the close back vowel /u/ is slightly more rounded than in Tokyo Japanese. Additionally, the mid front unrounded vowel /e/ differs from standard Japanese in that it retains the Late Middle Japanese variation between palatalized [ʲe̞] and unpalatalized [e̞]. The palatalization may spread to the previous consonant, so that the syllables /te se de ze/ might vary between [te̞ se̞ de̞ ze̞] and [tɕe̞ ɕe̞ dʑe̞ ʑe̞]. This is similar to the palatalization observed with the vowel /i/: [tɕi ɕi dʑi ʑi]. In Tanegashima, the mid back vowel /o/ still exhibits rounding in some words such as 魚 io [iʷo] "fish" or 塩 shio [ɕiʷo] "salt".

Vowel length remains contrastive in all regional dialects, but is noticeably less prominent and sometimes ambiguous in the mainland as a result of a process of vowel length reduction. Should historically short, high vowels be shown to devoice rather than delete following sibilant consonants, then dialects of the mainland may effectively contrast the devoiced vowels /i̥/ and /u̥/ with their non-devoiced counterparts /i/ and /u/, which arose from historically long vowels.

In comparison to standard Japanese, co-occurring vowel sequences tend to fuse into a single vowel, giving rise to a complex system of vowel coalescence in all regional dialects. In the dialect of Takarajima exceptionally, the sequences /ai/, /ae/ and /oi/ have not merged into /eː/ as in other regions, but have instead centralized to /ë(ː)/ and /ï(ː)/. The vowel /ï(ː)/ tends to result from a fusion of /ai/, while /ë(ː)/ usually stems from the fusion of /ae/ or /oi/. Neither of these two coalesced vowels trigger palatalization, consider, for example: [kjoːdïː] "siblings" (not *[kjoːdʑïː]). The vowel /ë(ː)/ is also unique in this dialect in that it may trigger the labialization of the consonant /h/ to [ɸ], as in [ɸëː] "ash".

=== Consonants ===
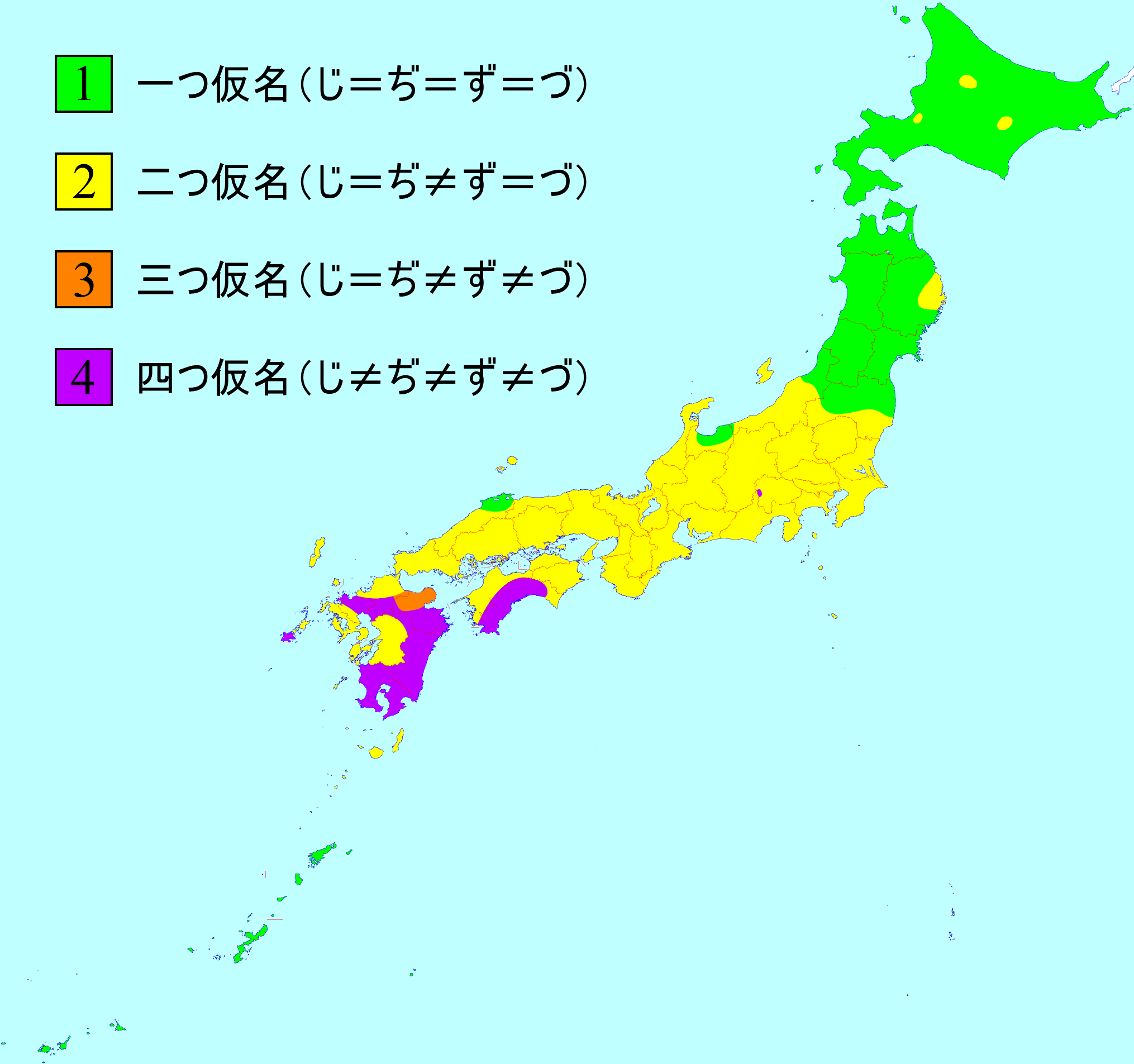
Conflation of the yotsugana syllables throughout Japan. Kagoshima falls in the purple area where all four syllables are still mostly distinguished. Using Nihon-shiki romanization: 1 sound (zi = di = zu = du) 2 sounds (zi = di ≠ zu = du) 3 sounds (zi = di ≠ zu ≠ du) 4 sounds (zi ≠ di ≠ zu ≠ du)

The basic consonant inventory of the Satsugū dialect is the same as that of standard Japanese.

		Bilabial	(Post-) Alveolar	Palatal	Velar		Glottal	Placeless
		Bilabial	(Post-) Alveolar	Palatal	plain	labial	Glottal	Placeless
Nasal		m	n					N
Plosive	voiceless	p	t		k	(kʷ)		Q
Plosive	voiced	b	d		g	(gʷ)		Q
Fricative	voiceless		s				h	H
Fricative	voiced		z					H
Liquid			ɽ	j		w		

The plosive consonants /t d n/ are laminal denti-alveolar and the fricatives /s z/ are laminal alveolar. Before /i/ and palatalized /e/, these sounds are alveolo-palatal ([t͡ɕ d͡ʑ n̠ʲ ɕ ʑ]) and before /u/ they are alveolar ([t͡s d͡z n s z]). In terms of the latter, the distinction between all four of the traditional yotsugana (四つ仮名; literally "four kana") syllables ジ /zi/, ヂ /di/, ズ /zu/ and ヅ /du/ is still preserved within the Kyūshū portion of Kagoshima. Here, they are contrastively realized as [ʑi], [d͡ʑi], [zu] and [d͡zu]. In respect to high vowel deletion, the pairs ヂ [d͡ʑi] and ヅ [d͡zu] act as obstruents rather than fricatives, as indicated through their underlying representations /di/ and /du/. In parts of northern Koshikijima exceptionally, the sounds [t͡ɕ d͡ʑ] contrast with [tʲ dʲ]: [utʲaː] "song.DAT" vs [utaː] "song.TOP" vs [ut͡ɕaː] "hit.TOP".

The flap consonant /ɽ/ is generally an apical postalveolar flap with undefined laterality. In word medial and final position, /ɽ/ is frequently rendered as a glide (see sonorant gliding below). It may also be subject to fortition, merging into /d/ in initial position, while occasionally shifting to /d/ or /t/ in medial position, especially if preceded by a devoiced syllable. Examples of fortition include 楽 /ɽaku/ → /daQ/ "ease", 来年 /ɽainen/ → /denen/ "next year", 面白い /omosiɽoi/ → /omosite/ "interesting; amusing", and 料理 /ɽjouɽi/ → /djui/ (pronounced [d͡ʑuj]) "cooking".

The fricative consonant /h/ is pronounced as a voiceless bilabial fricative [ɸ] before the vowel /u/, and may vary from a voiceless palatal fricative [ç] to a voiceless alveolo-palatal fricative [ɕ] before the vowel /i/, effectively merging with /s/ in this position. Curiously, the sibilant consonant /s/ has a tendency to debuccalize to /h/ in word medial position before the low vowel /a/, and more commonly before the high vowel /i/ in all positions. Examples of this include -han for -san (negative 'su' ending), kagohima for Kagoshima, gowahi for gowashi (copula), sahikabui for sashikabui "long time no see", etc.

The labialized velar consonants /kʷ/ and /ɡʷ/ have limited use, contrasting with /k/ and /ɡ/ almost solely before the vowel /a/. For example, 火事 /kʷazi/ "conflagration" contrasts with 家事 /kazi/ "housework". Nowadays, however, these sounds are in regression and younger speakers merge them with their non-labialized counterparts as in standard Japanese. So words like 鍬 /kʷa/ "hoe", 菓子 /kʷasi/ "sweets", ぐゎんたれ /ɡʷaNtaɽe/ "useless" and 観音 /kʷaNnoN/ "Goddess of Mercy" are now increasingly being pronounced /ka/, /kasi/, /ɡaNtaɽe/ and /kaNnoN/. Though uncommon, other sequences such as /kʷe/, /ɡʷe/, /kʷo/ and /ɡʷo/ may occur through contraction of /CuV/ to /CʷV/. For example, the imperative form of "eat", which is 食え /kue/ in standard Japanese, becomes 食ぇ /kʷe/ in the dialect, which contrasts both 崩え /kue/ "landslide" (pronounced [kuʲe̞]) and 貝 /ke/ "shellfish". They may also surface in a few onomatopoeic words, such as ぐぉっぐぉっ /ɡʷoQɡʷoQ/ "woof woof". In parts of Southern Satsuma and Tanegashima, /kʷ/ may allophonically be realized as [p], so that /kʷe/ "eat.imp" may be pronounced as [pe], and Tanegashima 杭 /kʷiː/ "thorn" becomes [piː].

==== Placeless consonants ====
The archiphonemes /N/ and /Q/ can also be represented by the uvular nasal /ɴ/ and the glottal stop /ʔ/. Both of these phonemes derive from deleting the point of articulation of a given syllable. Both correspond to a full mora and undergo a variety of assimilatory processes.

As with standard Japanese, the place of articulation of the moraic nasal /N/, which corresponds to a reduced nasal syllable, is determined by the following consonant. Contrary to standard Japanese, however, the moraic nasal may also surface in word-initial position, as in the expression んだもしたん ndamoshitan "wow!" or the word んんま nnma "horse".

Similarly, the moraic obstruent /Q/ corresponds to a reduced stop syllable. Contrary to the standard language, the moraic obstruent may occur word medially before any other sound except the moraic nasal. It may also occur in word-final position, which means that its phonetic realization cannot be immediately determined within the lexical unit. Like the moraic nasal, its place of articulation is mostly determined by the following consonant. Before other stops and fricatives, it assimilates, creating an effect of gemination. Before nasal syllables, the moraic obstruent may be realized, depending on the regional dialect, as a glottal stop [ʔ], so that /kiQne/ "fox" is pronounced [kiʔne]. Other dialects exhibit gemination in this position, so that the latter is pronounced [kinne] instead. At the end of utterances and in isolation, the moraic obstruent is predictably realized as a glottal stop [ʔ], which may also suggest that a parallelism exists between the glottal stop in interjections and the moraic obstruent in standard Japanese itself.

In some regions of Kagoshima such as Uchinoura, a third archiphoneme /H/ is described. /H/ is generally pronounced /ç/ and historically stems from a reduction of the syllables /su/, /si/, /zu/ and /zi/ in non-word initial position. For example, in Uchinoura, 娘 /musume/ became /muHme/ "daughter", 串焼き /kusijaki/ became /kuHjaQ/ "grilling on a skewer", and 火事 /kazi/ became /kaH/ "conflagration".

=== Phonological processes ===
==== Vowel coalescence ====
Vowel coalescence or vowel fusion is a phonological process by which two consecutive vowels merge into a single one. For example, in most Japanese dialects including that of Tokyo, the sequence of /a + i/ results in the monophthong /eː/: 高い /takai/ → /takeː/ "tall". Similarly, the Kagoshima dialects have also undergone a process of vowel coalescence. However, unlike dialects like that of Tokyo, the process is much more pervasive in Kagoshima, to the extent that nearly all vowel sequences exhibit some form of fusion.

For instance, vowel coalescence systematically occurs with the vowel /a/ followed by /i/, so that 灰 /hai/ "ash" and 貝 /kai/ "shellfish" become /heː/ and /keː/ respectively. Likewise, /o/ followed by /i/ results in the /eː/, so that 来い /koi/ "come" is becomes /keː/ as well. A sentence such as 貝を買いに来い /kai o kai ni koi/ "Come buy shellfish" would thus become /keː(o) keː keː keː/, which, due to vowel length reduction, is pronounced entirely as け(を)けけけ [ke(o) ke ke ke] in mainland Kagoshima.

It also occurs with the vowel /a/ followed by /u/, so that 赤く /aka(k)u/ "(to become) red" and 買う /kau/ "buy" become /akoː/ and /koː/ respectively. Other mergers include /ui/ → /iː/, /ou/ → /uː/, /ei/ → /eː/, /eu/ → /uː/, among numerous others that can be summarized in the following table, where the y-axis denotes the first vowel and the x-axis the second:

Table of vowel mergers in Kagoshima
	-a	-i	-u	-e	-o
a-	aː	eː	oː	ai, eː	aː
i-	ja	iː	ju	eː	jo
u-	aː	iː	uː	ue, eː	oː
e-	ea, ja	eː	uː	eː	jo
o-	aː	eː	oː, uː	oe	oː

Despite the extent of this sound change, the Kagoshima dialects are not devoid of co-occurring vowels due to other, subsequent sound changes that have taken place in the dialects. As an example, こい /koi/ "this" exists and is not reduced to *keː because it historically comes from /kore/.

==== High-vowel deletion ====
In Kagoshima's mainland, the high vowels /i/ and /u/ are systematically dropped in word final position after a non-fricative consonant. The remaining consonant is syllabified into coda position, where it is reduced to a moraic obstruent /Q/ if oral, or a moraic nasal /N/ if nasal. In the case of the palatal approximant /j/, it is reduced to its corresponding high vowel /i/.

Standard Japanese	Underlying form	Surface realization	Meaning
/mimi/	/miN/	[miɴ]	ear
/kamu/	/kaN/	[kaɴ]	to bite
/inu/	/iN/	[iɴ]	dog
/kubi/	/kuQ/	[kuʔ]	neck
/kuɡi/	/kuQ/	[kuʔ]	nail
/kutu/	/kuQ/	[kuʔ]	shoes
/tuju/	/tui/	[tsuj]	dew
/sjoju/	/sjoi/	[soj~ɕoj]	soy sauce

Word-medially, a syllable containing the high vowels /i/ and /u/ may also be reduced to its respective moraic equivalent if not already followed by a moraic obstruent or nasal. In this way, the town of Matsumoto is realized as /maQmoto/, the village of Shikine as /siQne/, the noun /nebuto/ skin boil as /neQto/ and the adjective /setunai/ painful as /seQne/. The assimilatory processes of a given regional dialect are then applied, so that "skin boil" is pronounced [netto], and "painful" may become either [seʔne] or [senne]. With regards to the latter, the difference may be marked in writing, so that for /maQmoto/, the pronunciation [maʔmoto] is written as まっもと maʔmoto, whereas [mammoto] is written as まんもと manmoto.

A similar effect to high vowel deletion can be observed with sibilants. Namely, the high vowels /i/ and /u/ will be devoiced to [i̥] and [u̥] respectively following a sibilant consonant such as /s/ or /h/, and may be deleted entirely especially in word-final position. This has an effect of weakening the syllables within which they are contained, causing them to have no effect on pitch in the same way as both the moraic nasal and obstruent do not. Devoicing or deletion of high vowels can also trigger devoicing of the fricative /z/, so that 火事 /kʷazi/ "conflagration" is pronounced [kʷaɕ(i̥)] or [kʷas(u̥)]. Occasionally, such syllables may dropped entirely, leaving behind an assimilatory trace like the moraic obstruent. For example, the name Kagoshima itself may be subject to this phenomenon, resulting in [kaɡoʔma] or [kaɡomma] instead of [kaɡoɕi̥ma]. Conflictingly, however, the sibilant consonant /s/ followed by /i/ may instead merge with /h/ or be dropped entirely, leading to the added pronunciations [kaɡoçima] and [kaɡoima].

==== Sonorant gliding ====
Sonorant gliding is a phonological process whereby the sonorant syllables /ɽi/, /ɽu/ and /ɽe/ are reduced to the high vowel /i/ in word medial or final position. When followed by another vowel, the /i/ may turn into a palatal glide /j/.

Standard Japanese	Kagoshima	Meaning
/maru/	/mai/	round
/mari/	/mai/	ball
/mare/	/mai/	rare
/oɽe/	/oi/	I, me
/koɽe, soɽe, aɽe/	/koi, soi, ai/	This, that, that over there
/kuɽuma/	/kuima/	Car, vehicle
/aɽiɡatai/	/aiɡate/	Grateful, thankful
/kakaɽi-au/	/kakaijo/	To be involved in

Note that, when it comes to the syllable /ɽu/, this sound change is mostly limited to the nominal rather than verbal paradigm, where the flap becomes a moraic obstruent instead (e.g. /kaɽu/ → /kaQ/).

==== Vowel length reduction ====
Today, the dialects of mainland Satsuma and Ōsumi can be described as lacking compensatory vowel lengthening, so that two vowels which coalesce into one will be short rather than long.

Standard Japanese	Tokyo Japanese	Tanegashima	Satsuma-Ōsumi	Meaning
/dai.koN/	[dee.koN]	/dee.koN/	/de.koN/	Radish
/tai.ɡai/	[tee.ɡee]	/tee.ɡe/	/te.ɡe/	Usually

However, it would be more accurate to say that the mainland dialects exhibited vowel length reduction, so that long vowels such as /eː/ later shortened to /e/. This accounts for the reason as to why certain words such as 昨日 /kinu/ "yesterday" or 鳥居 /toɽi/ "torii", which are /kinou/ and /toɽii/ in standard Japanese, are not subject to high vowel deletion or sonorant gliding, while 絹 /kiN/ "silk" and 鳥 /toi/ "bird", which are /kinu/ and /toɽi/ in standard Japanese, are. It also accounts for the discrepancy between forms when particles are attached to words, such as こい /koi/ "this", which derives from the historical form /koɽe/; versus これ /koɽe/ "this.dat", which derives from /koɽeː/, a fusion of /koɽe/ "this" and the dative particle /i/.

==== Other changes ====
Numerous other, less consistent changes have affected many of the regional dialects in Kagoshima. Some of these include:

- Historical vowel raising of the short vowel /o/ to /u/ following alveolar consonants in non-word-initial position:
  - /koto/ → /kotu/ (→ /koQ/) "thing; matter"
  - /asobu/ → /asubu/ (→ /asuQ/) "play"
  - /asoko/ → /asuko/ "over there"
- Historical vowel raising of the short vowel /o/ to /u/ following nasal consonants in word-final position, and subsequent reduction of the syllable to a moraic nasal in most Kagoshima dialects:
  - /mono/ → */monu/ → /moN/ "thing; person"
  - /domo/ → /domu/ → /doN/ "plural suffix"
- Reduction of the sequence /awa/ to /oː/, or less commonly /aː/:
  - /kawa/ → /koː/ (→ /ko/) "river; well"
  - /kawa/ → /kaː/ (→ /ka/) "river; well"
- Depalatalization of the sequences /sj/ and /zj/, especially in mainland Kagoshima:
  - /sjoːju/ → /sjoju/ → /soi/ "soy sauce"
  - /isja/ → /isa/ "doctor"
  - /mozjoka/ → /mozoka/ "cute"
- Intervocalic voicing of plosive consonants in southern Satsuma, notably in Makurazaki City:
  - /otoko/ → /odoɡo/ "man"
  - /sakura/ → /saɡura/ "cherry blossom"

=== Phonotactics ===
The syllable structure of the Kagoshima dialects is more complex than that of standard Japanese and can minimally be represented by the formula (C^{2})(G)V^{2}(P), where C^{2} represents a consonant or cluster of two consonants, G represents a glide, V^{2} represents a vowel or sequence of vowels and P represents any placeless consonant.

	Component	Details
Onset (optional)	Consonant^{2}	Any consonant or cluster of two consonants. Permissible clusters vary by region, but are largely limited to fricative-stop clusters such as [st] and [ɸt].
Onset (optional)	Glide	Only the palatal glide /j/ falls in this category.
Nucleus (obligatory)	Vowel^{2}	Any vowel, long vowel or sequence of vowels.
Coda (optional)	Placeless	Any placeless consonant, including /Q/, /N/ and /H/.

The above formula accounts for nearly all permissible syllable structures, with only one exception which is that /N/ and /NN/ can constitute full syllables on their own, found primarily only in word-initial position.

The following table illustrates some of the different types of syllables that are allowed in the Kagoshima dialects.

Syllable structure	Example word
V	/u/ 大 "large, great"
VV	/ai/ 蟻 "ant"
CVV	/soi/ そい "that"
CCV	/hto/ ([ɸto]) 人 "person"
CGV	/kju/ 今日 "today"
CVP	/kaH/ 火事 "conflagration"
CGVP	/sjaN/ 軍鶏 "game fowl"
NN (+ CV)	/NN.ma/ 馬 "horse"

=== Prosody ===
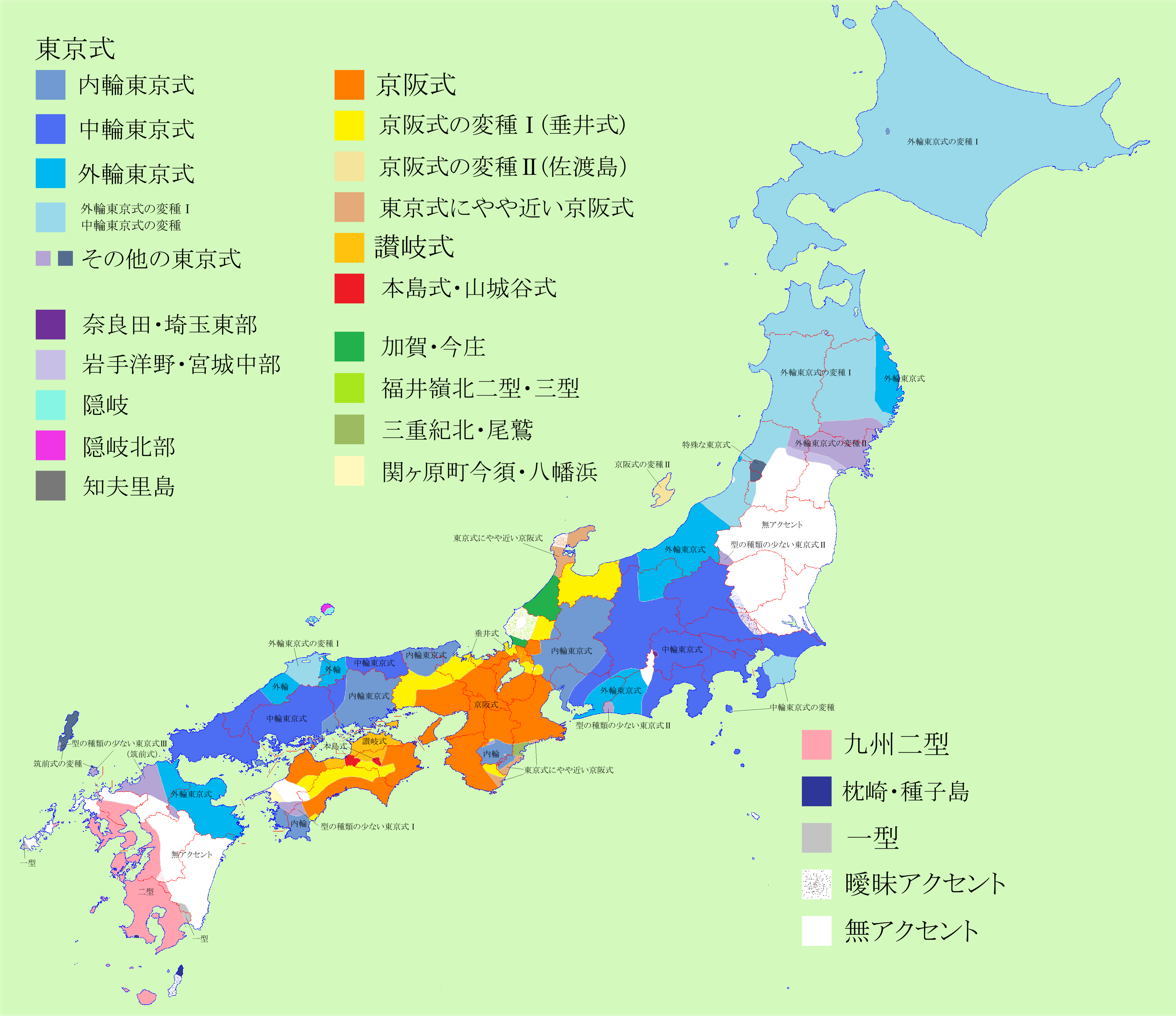
Map of the pitch accent systems throughout Japan. Most of Kagoshima falls into the South-Western Kyushu two-pattern accent group (■ 二型 nikei).

==== Kagoshima accent ====
One of the most oft-studied aspects of the Kagoshima dialect is its prosodic system. With the exception of a few areas such as Tanegashima, the system is described as a two-pattern pitch accent in which phrasal units may be either accented or unaccented. In accented units (also called "Type A" tone-bearing units), all syllables bear a low tonal pitch ("L") except for the penultimate syllable, which bears a high pitch ("H"). In unaccented units (also called "Type B" tone-bearing units), all syllables bear a low pitch until the final syllable, at which point the pitch rises to a high pitch.

Tone placement in accented and unaccented units
	Accented	Unaccented
1 syllable	(H)L^{[A]} 気 ki or k̅i̅i "spirit"	H 木 k̅i̅ "tree"
2 syllables	HL 鼻 h̅a̅na "nose"	LH 花 han̅a̅ "flower"
3 syllables	LHL 長め nag̅a̅me "longish"	LLH 眺め nagam̅e̅ "scene"

- ^{A} In accented words with only one syllable, the pitch is described as falling (sometimes written "F"). This is because the vowel is subject to lengthening, where the first mora in the syllable will bear a high tone while the second mora will bear a low tone. This means that 気 ki "spirit" would be pronounced like [kiː] and have a high-low (HL) pitch, as if it were a two-syllable word. This vowel length disappears when the word is followed by other morphemes such as particles.

Although the type of pitch accent is lexically determined, it is more specifically determined by the first element in a syntactic phrase and will apply to that entire phrase. This effectively means that the placement of the high tone in accented or unaccented units will shift rightwards to the penultimate or final syllable of the phrase when other morphemes, auxiliaries or grammatical particles such as が ga are appended at the end.

Tone shifting in accented and unaccented units
	Accented	Unaccented
1 → 2 syllables	HL 気が k̅i̅ga "spirit NOM"	LH 木が kig̅a̅ "tree NOM"
2 → 3 syllables	LHL 鼻が han̅a̅ga "nose NOM"	LLH 花が hanag̅a̅ "flower NOM"
3 → 4 syllables	LLHL 長めが nagam̅e̅ga "longish NOM"	LLLH 眺めが nagameg̅a̅ "scene NOM"

Because the accent pattern is always determined by the first element of the phrasal unit, prefixes will alter the accent type of the word to which they attach. For example, 寺 t̅e̅ra "temple" and 酒 s̅a̅ke are normally accented, but when the honorific prefix お o- is added, they shift to an unaccented pattern: お寺 oter̅a̅ and お酒 osak̅e̅.

Note that the high tone falls on the syllable rather than the mora, so tone placement remains unaffected by moraic obstruents, moraic nasals, fricatives resulting from devoicing, long vowels and diphthongs.

	Accented	Unaccented
Moraic Nasal	頑固 gwanko "stubbornness" /ɡʷaNko/ → ɡ̅ʷ̅a̅N̅ko	お盆 obon "Obon Festival" /oboN/ → ob̅o̅N̅
Moraic Obstruent	勝手 katte "one's convenience" /kaQte/ → k̅a̅Q̅te	ぼた餅 botamoʔ "adzuki-bean mochi" /botamoQ/ → botam̅o̅Q̅
Devoiced fricative	ガラス garasu "glass" /ɡaras(u)/ → g̅a̅ras(u)	烏 karasu "crow" /karas(u)/ → kar̅a̅s̅(u̅)
Vowel	車 kuima "car" /kuima/ → k̅u̅i̅ma	素通い sudo-oi "passing through" /sudooi/ → sud̅o̅o̅i̅

==== Makurazaki accent ====
The Makurazaki dialect, spoken in and around Makurazaki City, is described as a two-pattern pitch accent system very similar to that of the Kagoshima accent. In this dialect, accented units bear a high tone on all syllables except the penultimate syllable, which bears a low pitch. In unaccented units, all syllables have a high pitch except the final syllable, which bears a middle pitch ("M").

Tone placement in accented and unaccented units
	Accented	Unaccented
1 syllable	H 日 h̅i̅ "day"	M^{[B]} 火 ~~hi~~ "fire"
2 syllables	LH 鼻 han̅a̅ "nose"	HM 花 h̅a̅~~na~~ "flower"
3 syllables	HLH 桜 s̅a̅kur̅a̅ "cherry blossom"	HHM 男 o̅t̅o̅~~ko~~ "man"
4 syllables	HHLH 横糸 y̅o̅k̅o̅it̅o̅ "weft"	HHHM 朝顔 a̅s̅a̅g̅a̅~~o~~ "morning glory"

- ^{B} The tone of unaccented words with one syllable has also been described as "falling", but it is not clear whether this manifests itself as vowel lengthening similar to accented words in the Kagoshima accent.

Like mainland Kagoshima, the accent type is determined by the first element in the phrasal unit and the pitch will shift accordingly as other morphemes are added. For example, h̅a̅~~na~~ "flower" has a high-middle (HM) pitch in isolation, but when the particle が ga is appended, it becomes h̅a̅n̅a̅~~ga~~ "flower NOM" with a high-high-middle pitch (HHM).

==== Koshikijima accent ====
The prosodic system of Koshikijima, like that of mainland Kagoshima, is characterized as a two-pattern pitch accent. It differs, however, in the placement of the accent. In this system, the primary high tone falls on a mora and is always preceded by a low-pitched syllable. Any other syllables preceding the low one will automatically bear a high tone.

Similar to the Kagoshima Accent, the high tone is assigned to the very last mora in an unaccented unit. In an accented unit, the high tone falls on the penultimate mora and falls back down on the last mora. Tone placement will also shift accordingly when morphemes and the such are appended to the unit.

Tone placement in accented and unaccented units
	Accented	Unaccented
2 syllables	H*L 飴 a̅me "candy"	LH* 雨 am̅e̅ "rain"
3 syllables	LH*L 魚 sak̅a̅na "fish"	HLH* 命 i̅noc̅h̅i̅ "life"
5 syllables	HHLH*L 飴祭り a̅m̅e̅mat̅s̅u̅ri "candy festival"	HHHLH* 雨祭り a̅m̅e̅m̅a̅tsur̅i̅ "rain festival"

If, in an accented unit, the final low tone falls on a moraic consonant such as /N/, the second mora of a long vowel, or the second vowel of a diphthong, any syllable that follows will also bear a low tone. Otherwise, if the final low tone falls on a consonant-vowel syllable, any syllable that is added will shift the entire tone placement.

Colloquial	獣 k̅e̅dam̅o̅n "wild animal"	獣が k̅e̅dam̅o̅nga
Non-colloquial	獣 k̅e̅dam̅o̅no "wild animal"	獣が k̅e̅d̅a̅mon̅o̅ga

When multiple phrasal units are combined together, the second peak containing the primary high tone will become low in all units except the last one. Thus, for example, when the verbal phrase 見えた m̅i̅et̅a̅ "was seen" is combined with the nominalized phrase 獣が k̅e̅d̅a̅mon̅o̅ga "wild animal", the accent pattern becomes: 獣が見えた k̅e̅d̅a̅monoga m̅i̅et̅a̅ "a wild animal was seen". Likewise, when it is combined with the colloquial form k̅e̅dam̅o̅nga, the pattern becomes: k̅e̅damonga m̅i̅et̅a̅.

== Copula ==
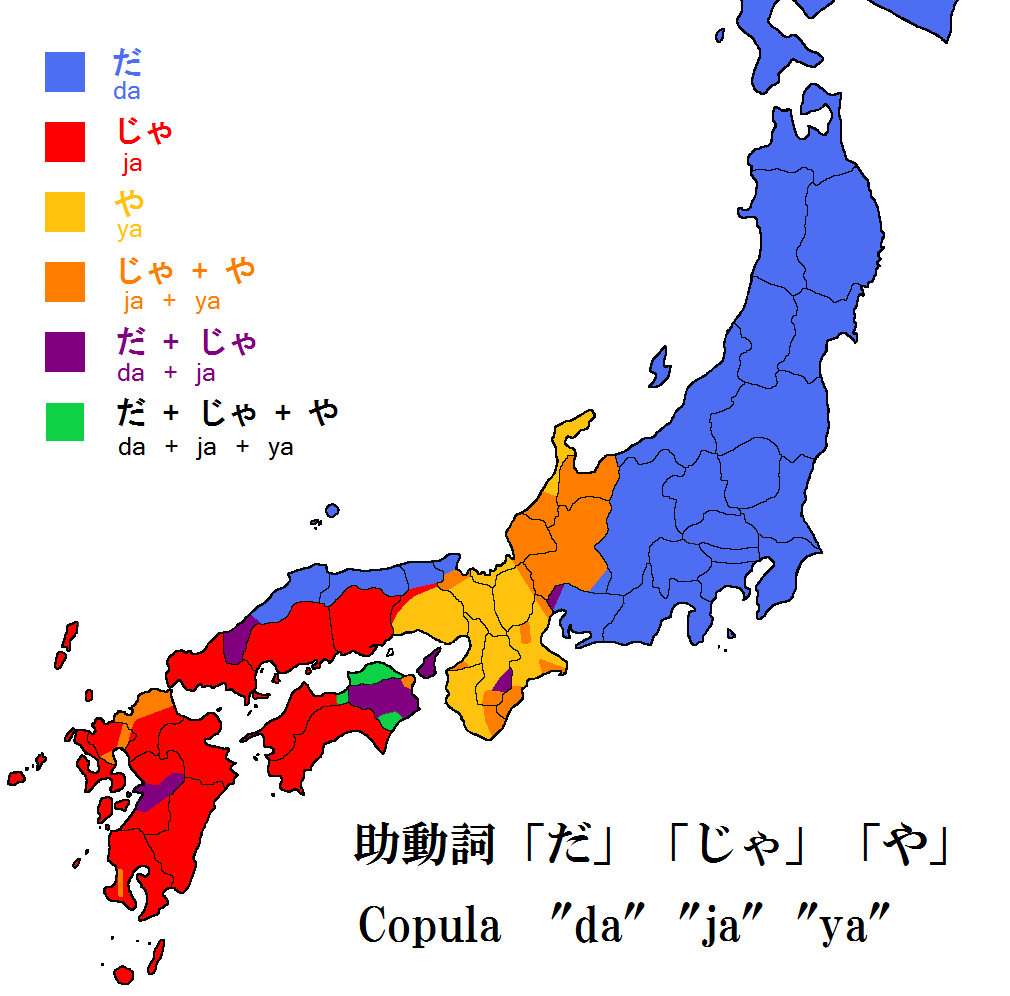
A map portraying the extent of the copula variants だ da, じゃ ja and や ya throughout Japan

The standard Japanese plain copula だ da is replaced by the Satsugū dialectal variation じゃ ja, which has further developed into や ya in some parts of the Satsuma Peninsula, most notably the capital city, Kagoshima. Historically, these forms arose from a contraction of the classical construction である de aru. Accordingly, the copula borrows its conjugational pattern from the existential verb ある aru, which is dialectally pronounced as あっ aʔ or あい ai, as seen below:

Using *ja as the base
Satsugū	Tokyo Japanese	Meaning
jaddo じゃっど	desu, da, sō da	Copula (to be)
jaddon じゃっどん	dakedo, dakedomo, shikashi	However, though
jaddo kai じゃっどかい	sō darō ka, sō na no	Is that so?
jan じゃん	janai	Negative copula
jaddo ne じゃっどね	da yo ne	Copula + emphasis
jaʔ, ja ga, jaddo	desu yo	Copula + assertion
jaddo じゃっど	nandesu	Copula (explanation) with noun
jaddo ya じゃっどや	nan desu ka	Copula (question)
njaddo んじゃっど	ndesu	Copula (explanation) with verb
jaro ne じゃろね	deshō ne	Seems, I think, I guess
jadde じゃっで	node, kara	Because of... the reason is...
jadden じゃっでん	demo	However, but
jatta じゃった	deshita, datta	Copula (past)

Politeness

Contrary to Western dialects, there exists no true equivalent to the standard polite copula です desu. In cases where standard Japanese would normally use desu, the Satsugū dialect would tend towards employing the plain form. For example, これですよ kore desu yo becomes こいじゃが koi ja ga, "this is it".

In very formal contexts, the honorific verb ごわす gowasu or ござす gozasu, and their variants ごわんす gowansu and ござんす gozansu, may be used instead. For the most part, their usage overlaps that of the standard form ございます gozaimasu. Compare, for example, the standard formulation ようございます yō gozaimasu to the Satsugū variant よかとごわす yoka to gowasu "it is alright"; or 本でございます hon de gozaimasu to 本ごわす hon gowasu "it is a book". Note that while similar, the honorific copula gowasu or gozasu is not normally preceded by the connecting particle で de. Therefore, such forms as でごわす *de gowasu may be considered calques on their standard counterpart.

== Adjectives ==
=== Adjectival verbs ===
A common feature among Western Kyūshū dialects is the difference in their adjective endings. Adjectival verbs, or true adjectives, end with the generic inflection -ka rather than -i in their attributive and predicative forms. Eastern Kyūshū dialects, however, follow the same pattern as Standard Japanese, using the inflectional ending -i. Positioned somewhat in the middle of this boundary, the Satsugū dialect makes use of both types of endings. For example, the adjectives "cold" and "exhausted" may surface as sanka and tesoka, or sami and tesoi (variants: sabi and tese) depending on the speaker and region. The -i ending will normally coalesce with the vowel of the preceding syllable (e.g. /a/ + /i/ → /e/), so that unmai "delicious" and gennai "shy" become unme and genne respectively.

The majority of Kagoshima's surrounding island dialects, however, tend to favor the generic inflection -ka, which may occasionally be voiced into -ga in southern parts of the Satsuma Peninsula, the Koshikijima Islands, Kuchinoerabujima and in northern Tanegashima. These peripheral dialects also tend to observe compensatory vowel lengthening when making use of the -i ending, so that the coalesced vowels will be long rather than short, thus resulting in unmee and gennee for "delicious" and "shy".

Comparative examples of -ka and -i adjectives in Mainland Kagoshima
-ka ending	-i ending	Standard Japanese	Meaning
yoka	e, ee	yoi	good
itaka	ite	itai	painful
unmaka, nmaka	unme	umai	delicious
nukka	nukii	atsui	hot
waika, wakka	warii	warui	bad
futoka	fute, fuchi	futoi	big
eshika, esuka, ejika	eji, eshii	zurui	sly
okka	obi	omoi	heavy
kaika	kari, kai	karui	light
tsuyoka	tsue	tsuyoi	strong
mojoka, mozoka, mujoka, muzoka	muze, muji	kawaii	cute
chintaka	chinte	tsumetai	cold
uzerashika	uzerashi, yazoroshi	urusai	loud, noisy, annoying
gurashika, ugurashika	ugurashi	kawaisou	pitiful, pathetic
gennaka	genne	hazukashii	shy, embarrassed

==== Inflection ====
The -ka ending historically derives from a contraction of the adverbial or infinitive ending -ku followed by the conjugated form of the copular verb ari, from which the rest of the adjectival paradigm derives. As such, the -ka ending inflects mostly in the same way as the -i ending. It differs primarily in the negative form where the final -i in -kunai is also turned into a -ka, reflecting the basic inflectional form of the adjective. The -ka ending also differs in the hypothetical form, where it becomes -kare(ba) instead of -kere(ba) (compare sankareba to sankereba "if it's cold"). In relation to standard Japanese, both -ka and -i adjectives distinguish themselves in the conjunctive form. Here, the conjunctive form surfaces as っせえ -ssee for the standard くて -kute form.

Inflectional paradigm of the adjective "hot"
		ka adjective	i adjective
present		ぬっか nukka	ぬき(い) nuki(i)
present	neg.	ぬ(っ)くなか nu(k)kunaka^{1}	ぬきくね nukikune^{1}
past		ぬっかった nukkatta	ぬきかった nukikatta
past	neg.	ぬ(っ)くなかった nu(k)kunakatta^{1}	ぬきくなかった nukikunakatta^{1}
imperfective		ぬっかろ nukkaro	ぬきかろ nukikaro
hypothetical		ぬっかれば nukkareba^{2}	ぬきければ nukikereba
conjunctive		ぬっかっせえ nukkassee	ぬきっせえ nukissee

- ^1 Unless already geminated, the syllable ku may be reduced to a moraic obstruent, resulting in a following geminate consonant. For example, ぬくなか nukunaka may be pronounced as ぬっなか nunnaka. This same reduction occurred in the conjunctive form, where the syllable ku in -kusee (standard -kute) was turned into a geminate -ssee. Alternatively, the syllable ku can be reduced to just -u, conforming with the basic adverbial ending. For example, んまくなか nmakunaka becomes んもなか nmonaka "it doesn't taste good".
- ^2 The hypothetical ending -reba can be colloquially pronounced as -ya as a result of sonorant gliding (/ɽe + wa/ → /i + a/ → /ja/). Compare 良かれば yokareba to 良かや yokaya "if it's good".

=== Adjectival nouns ===
Adjectival nouns, also called nominal adjectives or na-adjectives, comprise a set of nouns that functionally act as adjectives by combining themselves with the copula. The copula is subsequently inflected for aspect and tense, becoming na in its common attributive form. For example, buchiho na te means "a rude person".

Mainland Kagoshima	Standard Japanese	Meaning
yassen	dame	useless, hopeless
yakke	yakkai	trouble, bother, worry
ime	uchiki	bashful, shy, timid
sewa	shinpai	worry, concern, aid, help
buchiho	buchōhō	impolite

== Adverbs ==
With regards to adverbs, the same phonological process which reduced the Late Middle Japanese terminal and attributive endings (-shi and -ki, respectively) to -i, also reduced the adverbial (連用形, ren'yōkei) ending -ku to simply -u, yielding such forms as hayō (contraction of hayau) for hayaku "quickly". This change was once commonplace throughout Japan, however the adverbial form -ku was reintroduced through Standard Japanese as it was still preserved in some Eastern dialects. Even so, the -u ending persists in various honorifics (such as arigatō and omedetō) as a result of borrowing from the Kansai dialect, which was still regarded as a dialect of prestige well after it was no longer considered the standard language. Elsewhere, the -u ending remains a staple of Western Japanese and rural dialects. This includes the Satsugū dialect, where this ending still thrives today:

Root	Coalesced form (-u)		Standard Japanese (-ku)	Meaning
Root	Satsuma-Ōsumi	Tanegashima	Standard Japanese (-ku)	Meaning
/haja/	/hajo/	/hajoː/	/hajaku/	quickly
/oso/	/oso/	/osoː/	/osoku/	slowly
/kanasi/	/kanasju/	/kanasjuː/	/kanasiku/	sadly, sorrowfully
/usu/	/usu/	/usuː/	/usuku/	lightly, weakly

In addition to these characteristic adjectival adverbs, there are also many non-standard nominal and onomatopoeic adverbs unique to the dialects of Kagoshima. A few examples include:

Satsugū	Standard Japanese	Meaning
tege	daitai, kanari	generally, fairly, considerably
tegenashi	hotondo	mostly, almost
tegetege	iikagen, hodohodo, tekitou	considerably, moderately, suitably
wazzee, wasse, wacche, wazzeka, wazaika, wazareka, azze	totemo, hijou ni	very, really, exceedingly
ikki	sugu (ni)	immediately, instantly, soon
ittoʔ	chotto	in a short time, a little, somewhat
idden	itsudemo, itsunandoki	anytime, always, whenever
ikenden kogenden	doudemo koudemo, dounika	one way or another
iken shiten	doushitemo	by all means, no matter what, surely
makote, makochi, honnokote	makoto ni, hontou ni	really, truly
chinchinbobboʔ	sorosoro	gradually, slowly
mareken	tokidoki	sometimes, at times

== Particles ==
Particles (助詞 joshi) used in the dialects of Kagoshima share many features common to other dialects spoken in Kyūshū, with some being unique to the Satsugū dialect, and others corresponding the Standard Japanese and Kyūshū variants. Like standard Japanese particles, they act as suffixes, prepositions or words immediately following the noun, verb, adjective or phrase that they modify, and are used to indicate the relationship between the various elements of a sentence.

Unlike central Japanese dialects, particles in the Kagoshima dialects are bound clitics, as they have the effect of resyllabifying the last word they attach to. So, for example, the standard forms 本を hon o "book ACC", 書きを kaki o "writing ACC" and まりを mari o "ball ACC" would be realized as /honno/, /kakjo/ and /majo/ ( ← /maɽjo/) in most of northern and central Kagoshima, and /hoNnu/, /kakju/~/kaku/ and /maju/ ( ← /maɽju/) in parts of Kagoshima's southern mainland.

Resyllabification has also led to the reanalysis of some particles in a few dialects. For instance, the topic particle (w)a has been completely superseded by the form na in Izumi, which in most mainland dialects is merely a variant of (w)a after a moraic nasal.

Comparison of some particles between Kagoshima and standard Japanese
Kagoshima dialect	Standard Japanese	General meaning
a	wa	Marks the topic
do	yo, zo, ze	Marks an assertion
don, batten	demo, keredomo	Marks an adverse or opposition statement
don, doma, bakkai	bakari, gurai	Marks approximation
ga, no	no	Marks possession
gii, zui	made	Marks a time or place as a limit
i	ni, e	Marks a location, direction, indirect object or agent of a passive sentence
o, oba	o	Marks the direct object
shiko	dake, hodo, shika	Marks an extent or limit
to, taa	no, no wa, mono wa	Marks a nominalized phrase
yokka	yori	Marks provenance

For a full in-depth list of the particles found in this dialect, including examples, see the article Particles of the Kagoshima dialects.

== Vocabulary ==
=== Pronouns ===
Pronouns in the Satsugū dialect display considerable variation from their standard counterparts. The table below lists the most common pronouns as they occur in their basic forms. When followed by particles beginning with a vowel or a glide, affected pronouns will be resyllabified in the coda according to the phonological patterns of the local dialect. In most of mainland Kagoshima, for instance, when the pronouns oi "I" and ohan "you" are followed by the topic particle a, they become oya and ohanna respectively. Similarly, in Tanegashima, when the pronoun waga "oneself" is followed by the topic particle wa, it becomes wagoo.

Romaji	Hiragana	Kanji	Formality	Notes
Reflexive pronoun
waga	わが	我	formal	Often used in the sense of the standard term 自分 jibun, roughly meaning "oneself", "yourself" or "myself".
First-person pronouns
oi	おい	俺	formal, informal	Though it derives from おれ ore, the pronoun おい oi is commonly used by both men and women of all ages in Kagoshima. The shortened form お o is also used in a few regions.
atai	あたい	私	formal	More common among women; the form あて ate is sometimes used. Derives from わたし watashi.
don	どん	共		Used chiefly in Tanegashima; variants include ども domo, どむ domu and どんが donga.
wan	わん	我ん		Used chiefly in Nakanoshima. Possibly borrowed from the Amami dialects where this form is common. Note that the form wantachi, also used in Tanegashima along with the variants wanchi and wandomo, is a plural second-person pronoun meaning "you (pl)" (cf. the pronoun wai below).
Second-person pronouns
ohan	おはん		formal	The honorific prefix o- is sometimes omitted, making it more informal.
omai	おまい	お前	informal	A variant of おまえ omae.
wai	わい	我	formal	Derives from the historical form われ ware. The shortened form わ wa is sometimes used.
omansa(a)	おまんさ(あ)	お前様	very formal	Related to the standard form おまえさま omaesama which is now considered archaic.
nn	んん	己 or 汝		Considered somewhat archaic and abasing. The form derives from a reduction of the historical pronoun うぬ unu, meaning "you" or "thou". Sometimes used in the sense of the standard term 自分 jibun, roughly meaning "oneself", "yourself" or "myself".
oze, oje	おぜ, おじぇ		formal, informal	Used chiefly in Tanegashima.
akko	あっこ			Used chiefly in northern Koshikijima. In this dialect, it is considered slightly more polite than the pronoun わい wai.
nan	なん	汝ん		Used chiefly in Nakanoshima. Possibly borrowed from the Amami dialects where this form is common.
Third-person pronouns
ai	あい	彼		Derives from the form あれ are, which itself stems from the older form かれ kare, still used in standard Japanese. As a deictic pronoun, it follows the morphological pattern of demonstratives. Thus, あい ai becomes あん an in its possessive form.
anta	あんた	彼方		Though it ultimately derives from anata, the form anta is here used as a third person pronoun and does not carry the pejorative nuance it does in mainland Japan. The related forms こんた konta and そんた sonta are also occasionally used, and differ primarily by the proximity or relation between the person concerned and the speaker.
anshi	あんし	彼人, 彼ん人, 彼衆, 彼ん衆		From the demonstrative あん an and the person suffix し -shi; equivalent to the standard term あの人 ano hito. The related forms こんし konshi and そんし sonshi are also sometimes used, and differ primarily by the proximity or relation between the person concerned and the speaker.
anossama, anossa(a)	あのっさま, あのっさ(あ)	あのっ様	very formal	The related variants このっさま konossama, このっさ(あ) konossa(a), そのっさま sonossama and そのっさ(あ) sonossa(a) are also sometimes used. Like the above, these differ primarily by the proximity or relation between the person concerned and the speaker.

==== Suffixes ====
In mainland Kagoshima, the two suffixes どん -don and たっ -taʔ are commonly appended to the pronouns above in order to indicate plurality: おい oi "I" → おいどん oidon "we", おはん ohan "you" → おはんたっ ohantaʔ "you (pl)". The suffix -don historically derives from the ending 共 domo, as revealed when topicalized as どま -doma. More rarely, it may also be topicalized as だ -da, as in おいだ oida "we.top" or わいだ waida "you (pl).top". Due to its pervasive use in the Satsuma region, the ending domo may have come to be associated with the speech of samurais, and thus carries a slight condescending or humble connotation in standard Japanese. The suffix -taʔ originates from 達 -tachi, and may be topicalized as たちゃ -tacha. Elsewhere in Kagoshima's peripheral islands, the forms differ only slightly. In the Satsunan islands, the ending 共 -domo is most common, and may be topicalized as domaa in Tanegashima. The ending -tachi appears to be favored in the Tokara Islands and may be clipped as -(t)chi in Tanegashima, resulting in such forms as wanchi or wagatchi for "you (pl)".

In the mainland, the suffix どん -don also carries a second function: it can be used as an honorific as opposed to a plural-marking suffix. It is worth noting, however, that the honorific suffix stems from the historical form 殿 dono, now used in standard Japanese almost uniquely in business correspondences. In Kagoshima, the usage of the honorific suffix -don corresponds very closely to that of the standard Japanese honorifics 様 sama and さん san. For instance, -don can be used in a very pompous manner with the first-person pronoun, resulting in おいどん oidon "I/my esteemed self", which is equivalent to standard Japanese 俺様 oresama. Other examples of honorific usage include 母どん kakadon "mom" (standard: お母さん okaasan), 親父どん oyaddon "dad" (standard: お父さん otōsan) and 日どん hidon "sun" (standard: お日様 ohisama). The suffix is also used in terms of address in a similar way to -san in Japanese, so 大迫どん Osako-don would be equivalent to 大迫さん Ōsako-san in standard Japanese or "Mr./Ms. Ōsako" in English. Now more and more, however, this usage is being phased out in favor of its standard Japanese counterparts.

The honorific suffix 様 -sama is also used in a limited number of expressions, along with its more common mainland variant さ(あ) -sa(a). For example, あのっさあ anossaa or あのっさま anossama are honorific pronouns used to refer to a third person, while 天道様 tendosa is another honorific term used to refer to the sun, and 神様 kansaa is an honorific referring to gods or deities. Under the influence of mainland Japanese and in certain regions like Nakanoshima, the variants さん -san and はん -han are used, especially with terms of kinship. Some examples from Nakanoshima include: おっとはん ottohan "dad", おっかはん okkahan "mom" and あんさん ansan "older brother".

=== Demonstratives ===
	ko-	so-	a-	do-
-i	koi this one	soi that one	ai that one over there	doi which one?
-n	kon (of) this	son (of) that	an (of) that over there	don (of) what?
-gen(a)	kogen(a) like this in this manner	sogen(a) like that in that manner	agen(a) like that over there in that (other) manner	dogen(a) what sort of? how? in what manner?
-ko	koko here	soko there	asuko * over there	doko where?
-shiko	koshiko to this extent, only this much	soshiko to that extent, only that much	ashiko to that extent, only that much	doshiko to what extent? how much?

* irregular formation; variants include ashiko, ahiko and akko

As with Standard Japanese, demonstratives also occur in the ko- (proximal), so- (mesial), and a- (distal) series, with the corresponding interrogative form as do-.

The pronoun series is created using the suffix -i, which is a reduced form of the standard suffix -re. Particles attached to this form may cause the underlying historical form -re to resurface. For example, when the dative particle -i (standard -ni) is attached, the forms become kore, sore, are and dore, since sonorant gliding (i.e. /ɽe/ → /i/) fails to trigger when the vowel stems from a historically long vowel or diphthong (i.e. /ɽei/ → */i/). So instead, vowel coalescence and vowel reduction are exhibited (/ɽei/ → /ɽeː/ → /ɽe/).

The determiner suffix surfaces as -n for the standard ending -no. Thus, "this book" would be expressed as こん本 kon hon. The determiner series also serves to replace the standard Japanese person series -itsu by compounding onto it the noun waro (or warō in Tanegashima), roughly meaning "person", creating the forms kon waro, son waro, an waro and more rarely don waro. Tanegashima also appears to make use of the determiner series followed by the suffix 共 domo to indicate plurality, so kon domo would effectively mean "these people" or "these guys".

The kind and manner series, which are -nna(ni) and -u in standard Japanese, are grouped together under the -gen (before a verb) and -gena (before a noun) series, which may be elided to -en and -ena in casual speech. In parts of the Koshikijima Islands, the latter may be pronounced as -gan or -ran. In other parts, namely the Southern Satsuma Peninsula, these forms are replaced by compounding the determiner suffix -n with the noun yu followed by the directional suffix -n if used before a verb, thus creating the forms konyu(n), sonyu(n), anyu(n) and donyu(n). The preceding compound is equivalent to that of the standard form -noyou(ni), as in konoyou(ni), sonoyou(ni), etc.

The place suffix -ko remains the same as standard Japanese. However, the directional series -chira, preserved in the expression accha koccha "here and there" (standard achira kochira), is more commonly replaced by appending the directional particle -i (standard -ni and -e) to the place series, resulting in the form -ke (koke, soke, asuke, doke) due to vowel coalescence. In Tanegashima uniquely, this form is instead expressed by tagging on the directional particle -i to the pronominal series (-re), resulting in koree, soree, aree, and doree. The directional ending -tchi(i) is also in use in a number of areas, giving kotchi(i), sotchi(i), atchi(i), dotchi(i).

And lastly, the Satsugū dialect also makes use of an extra series that describes limits using the -shiko suffix, which is roughly the equivalent of the standard Japanese construction -re + -dake or -hodo. So sore dake "only that much" in standard Japanese would become soshiko in the dialect. To express approximation, as in "only about that much", the particle ばっかい bakkai may be added to form soshiko bakkai. The interrogative form doshiko is commonly used to ask about prices: doshiko na? "how much is it?" (standard ikura desu ka?).

== Verbs ==
The verbal morphology of the Kagoshima dialects is heavily marked by its divergent phonological processes. Vowels can, for instance, coalesce, devoice, or be deleted entirely depending on the preceding sound. For example, the standard form 書く kaku "write" becomes 書っ kaʔ in the dialects of the mainland as a result of high vowel deletion. In addition to such changes, noticeable morphological differences exist between the standard language and the dialects. For example, the Kagoshima dialects pattern more closely with Western Japanese and Kyushu dialects, using the negative ending -n as opposed to -nai. So the form 書かん kakan "not write" is used instead of the standard equivalent 書かない kakanai. Other examples include the use of the form -ute instead of -tte in the imperfective (ta) and conjunctive (te) forms of verbs ending with the vowel stem -u, or the auxiliary おる oru (おっ oʔ) instead of いる iru for the progressive form. More specific to regions of Kyushu, the dialects continue to use the form -(y)uru for verbs that would end in -eru in standard Japanese, as in 見ゆる miyuru (見ゆっ miyuʔ) "to be seen" instead of 見える mieru, and they also use the auxiliary verb gotaru (gotaʔ) where standard Japanese uses the ending -tai to express desire, as in 食ぉごたっ kwo-gotaʔ "want to eat" as opposed to the standard forms 食いたい kuitai or 食べたい tabetai.

Other noticeable differences specific to Kagoshima include its significant array of honorifics. For example, the polite auxiliary verbs もす mosu (or もうす mōsu in Tanegashima) and もんす monsu, sometimes written as 申す and 申んす respectively, are used instead of the standard ending ます -masu. Compare 食もいもす tamoi-mosu to 食べます tabemasu "(polite) eat". The endings す -su and んす -nsu are also sometimes used to replace to stem of verbs ending in -ru in order to add an extra degree of politeness. As a result, multiple variants of the same verb may exist: やる yaru, やす yasu and やんす yansu are all formal auxiliaries used in imperative constructions, as in 食もいやんせ tamoi-yanse "please eat". And, while the form やいもす yai-mosu exists, the forms やしもす yashi-mosu and やんしもす yanshi-mosu are not used, suggesting that す -su and んす -nsu may be reduced forms of the auxiliary verbs もす mosu and もんす monsu. Related differences include kui-yai or kui-yanse instead of the standard form kudasai for politely requesting that someones does something for the speaker.

Many other differences also exist, especially at the lexical level. Examples in mainland Kagoshima include asubu (asuʔ) instead of asobu "to play", keshinu (keshin) instead of shinu "to die", kibaru (kibaʔ) instead of ganbaru "to do one's best", saruku or sariku (saruʔ or sariʔ) instead of arukimawaru "to walk around", ayumu (ayun) instead of aruku "to walk", and so on.

== See also ==
Japanese dialects spoken north of Kagoshima:

- Hichiku dialect
- Hōnichi dialect

Japonic languages spoken directly south of the Kagoshima dialect boundaries:

- Amami Ōshima language
- Kikai language

Influential dialects:

- Kansai dialect (historically influential)
- Tokyo dialect (currently influential)
