= 26th parallel =

26th parallel may refer to:

- 26th parallel north, a circle of latitude in the Northern Hemisphere
- 26th parallel south, a circle of latitude in the Southern Hemisphere
