= 27th parallel =

27th parallel may refer to:

- 27th parallel north, a circle of latitude in the Northern Hemisphere
- 27th parallel south, a circle of latitude in the Southern Hemisphere
