= 28th parallel =

28th parallel may refer to:

- 28th parallel north, a circle of latitude in the Northern Hemisphere
- 28th parallel south, a circle of latitude in the Southern Hemisphere
