= Kogajajima =

Uninhabited island within the Ryukyu Islands

Native name: Japanese: 小臥蛇島
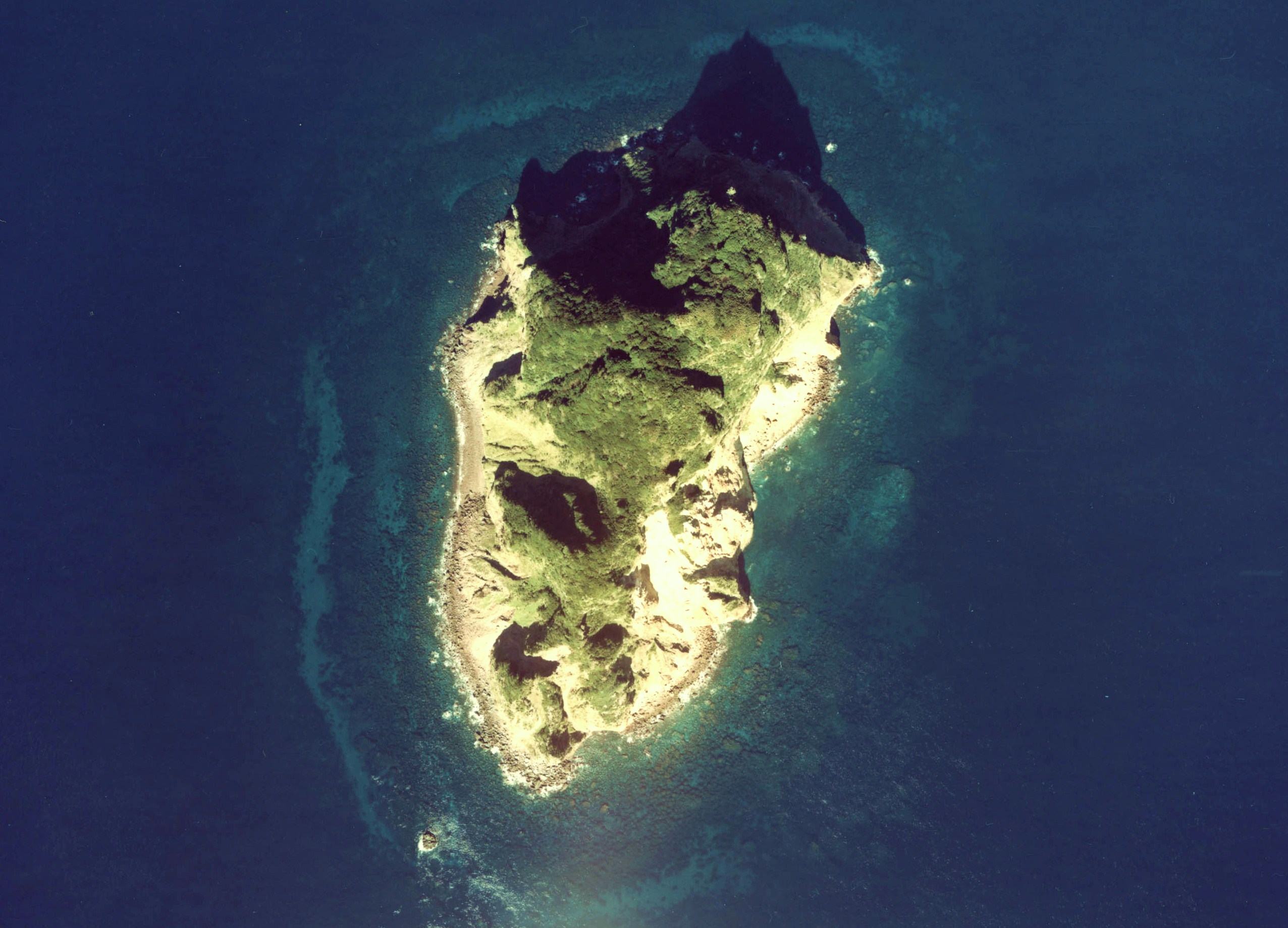
- Aerial photo of Kogagajima

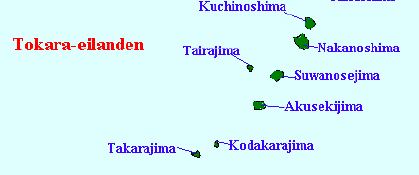

Geography
- Location: East China Sea
- Coordinates: 29°52′N 129°37′E
- Archipelago: Tokara Islands
- Area: 0.5 km^{2} (0.19 sq mi)
- Coastline: 2.5 km (1.55 mi)
- Highest elevation: 301 m (988 ft)

Administration
- Japan
- Kagoshima Prefecture

Demographics
- Ethnic groups: -uninhabited-

Kogajajima (小臥蛇島) is an uninhabited volcanic island located in the Tokara Islands, part of the Kagoshima Prefecture, Japan.

== Geography ==
Kogajajima is located 5.6 kilometres (3.0 nmi) east-southeast from Gajajima. It is the partial exposed portion of an eroded lava dome of a stratovolcano arising from the ocean floor, to a maximum height of 301 metres (988 ft) above sea level. No volcanic activity has been recorded in historic times.

The local climate is classified as subtropical, with a rainy season from May through September.

== History ==
Kogajajima does not appear to have ever had permanent human habitation.

During the Ryukyu Kingdom era, the territory of the kingdom reached as far as Kogajajima island.

During the Edo period, Kogajajima was part of Satsuma Domain and was administered as part of Kawabe District. In 1896, the island was transferred to the administrative control of Ōshima District, Kagoshima, and from 1911 was administered as part of the village of Toshima, Kagoshima. From 1946 to 1952, the island was administered by the United States as part of the Provisional Government of Northern Ryukyu Islands.

== See also ==
- List of volcanoes in Japan
- List of islands
- Desert island
