= 29th parallel =

29th parallel may refer to:

- 29th parallel north, a circle of latitude in the Northern Hemisphere
- 29th parallel south, a circle of latitude in the Southern Hemisphere
