= Kaminonejima =

Uninhabited island within the Ryukyu Islands

Kaminone Island
Native name: 上ノ根島
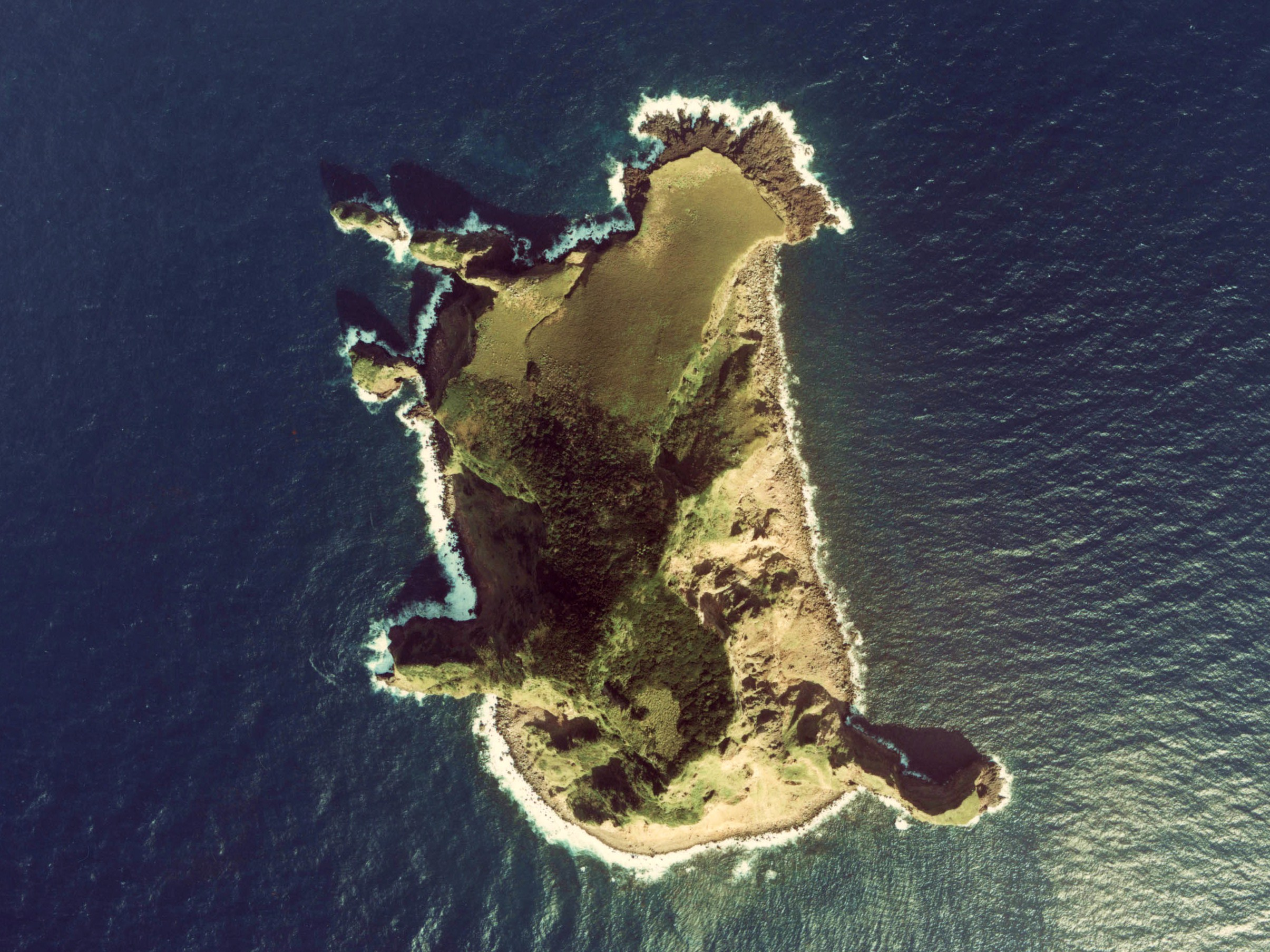
- Aerial view of Kaminone Island

Geography
- Location: Kagoshima Prefecture
- Coordinates: 28°49′54″N 129°00′04″E
- Archipelago: Tokara Islands (Ryukyu Arc)
- Area: 0.54 km^{2} (0.21 sq mi)
- Highest point: 918 ft (280 m)

Administration
- Japan

Demographics
- Population: 0

Kaminonejima (Japanese: 上ノ根島, Kaminone-jima) or Kaminone Island, is a small uninhabited island located in the Tokara Islands of Kagoshima Prefecture, Japan.

It formed out of the same stratovolcano that created nearby Yokoate-jima, positioned 2.4 kilometers south of Kaminone.

== See also ==
- Tokara Islands
- Yokoate-jima
- Ryukyu Islands
