= Yokoate-jima =

Uninhabited island within the Ryukyu Islands

Native name: Japanese: 横当島
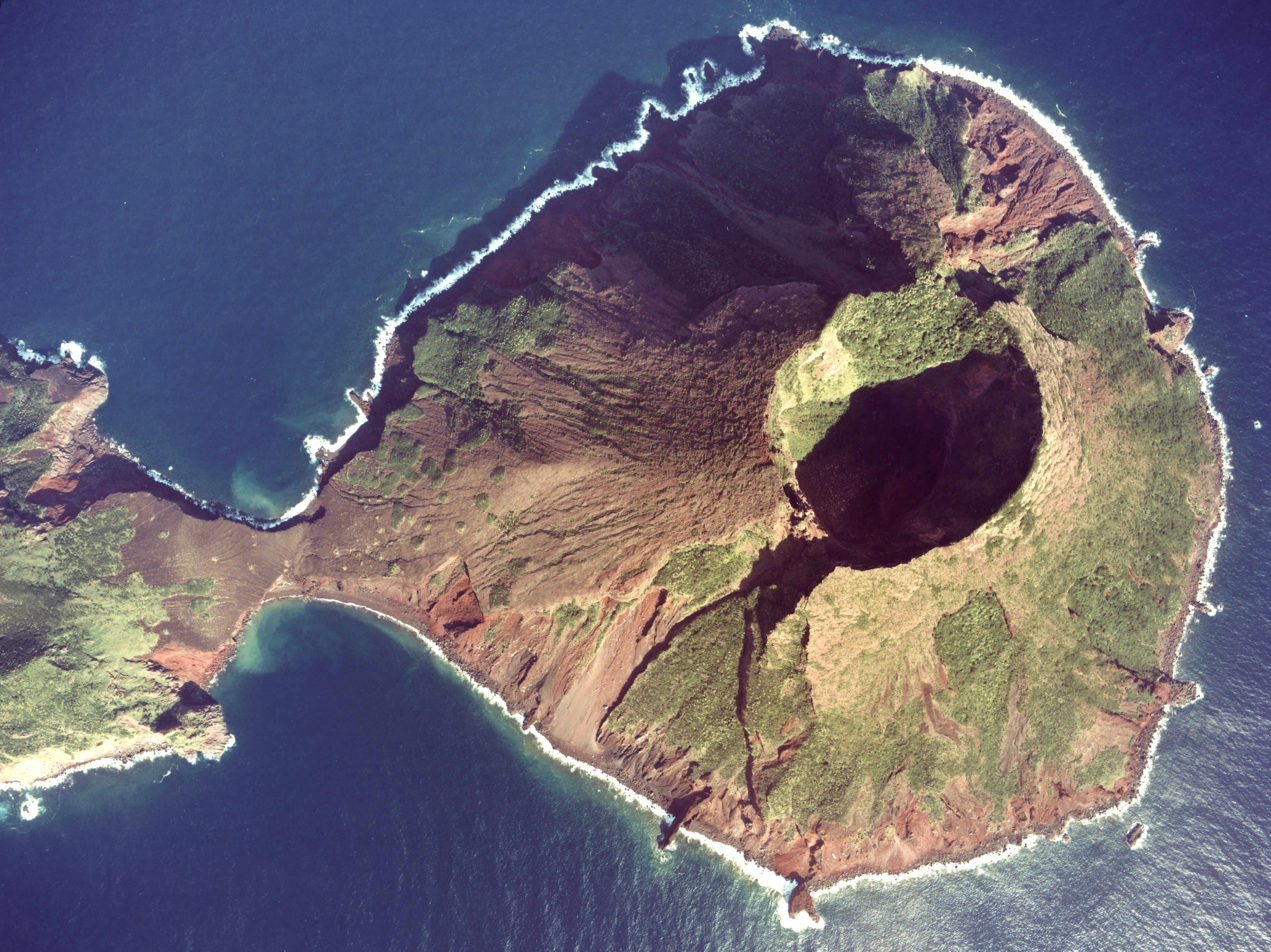
- Yokoate-jima (Higashimine)

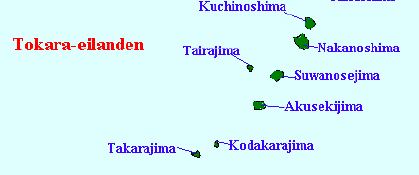

Geography
- Location: East China Sea
- Coordinates: 28°47′58″N 128°59′46″E
- Archipelago: Tokara Islands
- Area: 2.76 km^{2} (1.07 sq mi)
- Coastline: 10.2 km (6.34 mi)
- Highest elevation: 494.8 m (1623.4 ft)
- Highest point: Higashimine

Administration
- Japan
- Kagoshima Prefecture

Demographics
- Ethnic groups: -uninhabited-

Yokoate-jima (横当島) is an uninhabited volcanic island located in the Tokara Islands, part of the Kagoshima Prefecture, Japan.

== Geography ==
Yokoate-jima is located 42 kilometres (23 nmi) south-southwest from Takarajima and 60 kilometres (32 nmi) northwest from Amami Ōshima

The island is formed by two smaller stratovolcanoes - Higashimine (東峰) to the east, with a maximum elevation of 494.8 metres (1,623 ft) and Nishimine (西峰) to the west, with a maximum elevation of 259 metres (850 ft). The only known volcanic activity on either peak was towards the end of the Edo period, around 1835 ± 30 years. The inside of both caldera are forested, whereas the outer slopes of both mountains is largely barren.

The local climate is classified as subtropical, with a rainy season from May through September.

Kaminonejima (上ノ根島) is another uninhabited island located approximately 2.4 kilometres (1.3 nmi) north of Yokoate-jima. It is another exposed portion of the caldera rim of the same stratovolcano as Yokoate-jima.

== History ==
Yokoate-jima is surrounded by cliffs, making landing difficult. It does not appear to have ever had permanent human habitation. During the Edo period, Yokoate-jima was part of Satsuma Domain and was administered as part of Kawabe District. In 1896, the island was transferred to the administrative control of Ōshima District, Kagoshima, and from 1911 was administered as part of the village of Toshima, Kagoshima. From 1946 to 1952, the island was administered by the United States as part of the Provisional Government of Northern Ryukyu Islands.

== See also ==
- List of volcanoes in Japan
- List of islands
- Desert island
