= Gajajima =

Formerly inhabited island within the Ryukyu Islands

Native name: Japanese: 臥蛇島
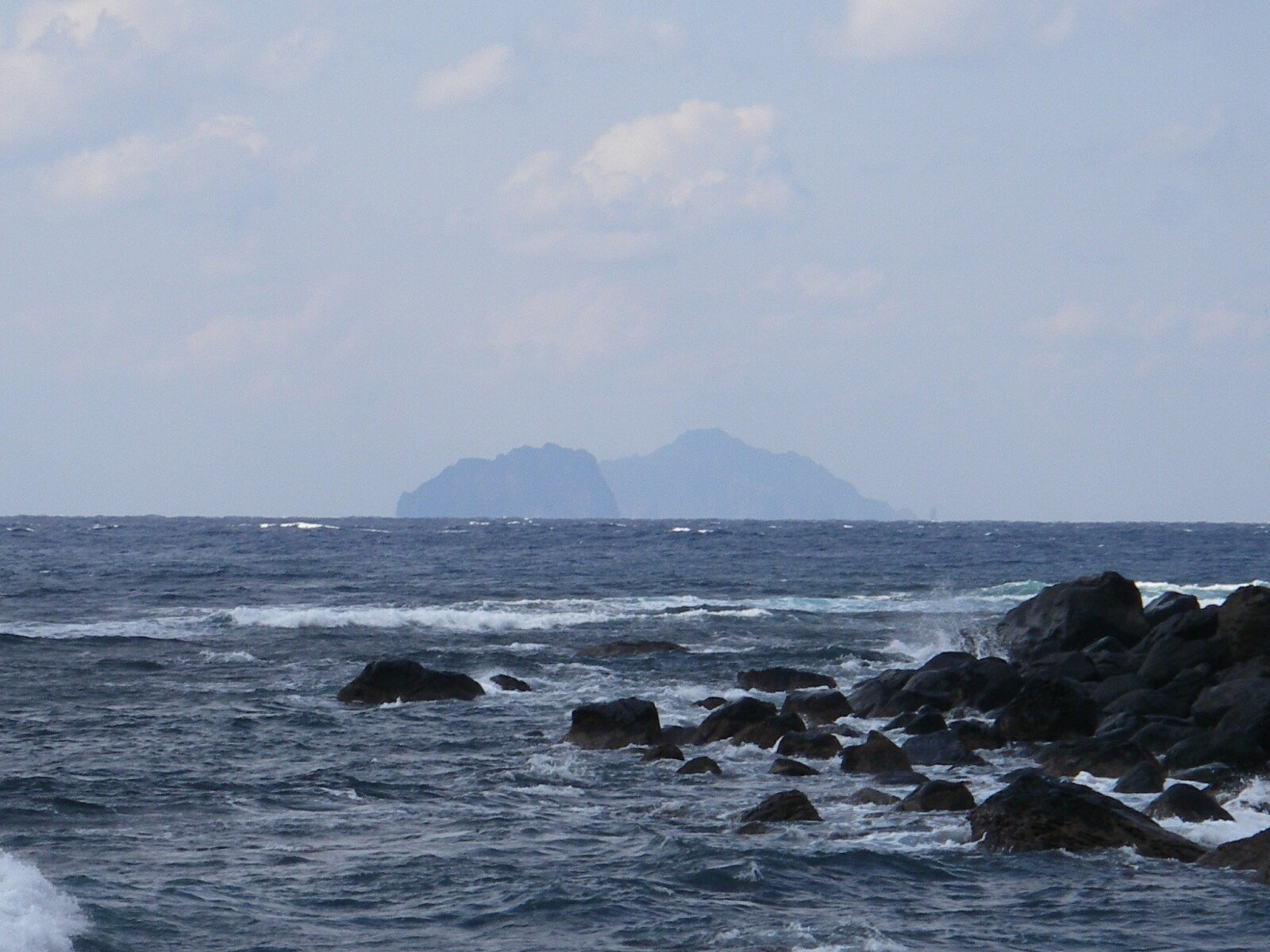
- Gajajima and Kogajajima
- Interactive map of Gajajima

Geography
- Location: East China Sea
- Coordinates: 29°54′N 129°32′E
- Archipelago: Tokara Islands
- Area: 4.07 km^{2} (1.57 sq mi)
- Length: 3 km (1.9 mi)
- Width: 2 km (1.2 mi)
- Coastline: 9 km (5.6 mi)
- Highest elevation: 497 m (1631 ft)

Administration
- Japan

Demographics
- Population: 0

Gajajima (臥蛇島), is an abandoned island in the Tokara Islands, a sub-group of the Satsunan Islands belonging to Kagoshima Prefecture, Japan. The island has an area of 4.07 km^{2} in area and was inhabited to 1970.

== Geography ==
Gajajima is located 28 kilometres (15 nmi) west of Nakanoshima. The island is volcanic in origin, although no volcanic activity has occurred in historic times and no comprehensive geological survey has been performed. The irregularly-shaped island has an area of approximately 4.07 square kilometres (1.57 sq mi) with a length of about 3 kilometres (1.9 mi) and a width of 2 kilometres (1.2 mi). The coastline is surrounded by cliffs of up to 100 meters in height, making landing impossible except for one location in the south. The highest elevation on the island is 497 metres (1,631 ft) above sea level. Its climate is classified as subtropical, with a rainy season from May through September.

== History ==
Per local folklore, the island was one of the havens of the defeated Heike clan after they lost the Genpei War against the Minamoto clan. It came under the control of the Shimazu clan from 1434. In 1450, the island was invaded by the Ryukyu Kingdom, and was the northernmost expansion of that country. During the Edo period, Takarajima was part of Satsuma Domain and was administered as part of Kawabe District. In 1896, the island was transferred to the administrative control of Ōshima District, Kagoshima, and from 1911 was part of the village of Toshima, Kagoshima. A lighthouse was completed in 1940, and the population at that time was 133. The village had an elementary school, and its own ship for connection to the mainland and other islands.

From 1946 to 1952, the island was administered by the United States as part of the Provisional Government of Northern Ryukyu Islands. A junior high school was built in 1948, power plant and water treatment plant in 1961 and telephone system in 1966. The population was economically supported by commercial fishing for bonito. However, the island was repeatedly devastated by typhoons, especially in 1945, 1951, 1956, and 1957 leading to plans to relocate the population to either Amami Ōshima or mainland Kagoshima Prefecture. Collapse of the bonito fisheries for unknown reasons financially ruined the islanders and led to near famine conditions, causing many islanders to leave. A decision was reached by the government to relocate the remaining seven households with a total of 28 people to Kagoshima in January 1970. At the time of the evacuation on 28 July 1970, only 4 households with 16 people were remaining. However, even after the evacuation of the inhabitants, the lighthouse remained staffed until April 1982.

Although landing is not permitted to the general public, the abandoned buildings have been looted, and in 1996 the Japanese government discovered that a party of six Chinese had illegally landed on the island and were attempting to establish residence. Groups of former island residents have visited the island in 2001 and 2010 to take care of their ancestral graves.

== See also ==
- Desert island
- List of islands
