= Tokara Islands =

Archipelago within the Ryukyu Islands

Tokara
Native name: 吐噶喇列島 (トカラ列島), Tokara rettō
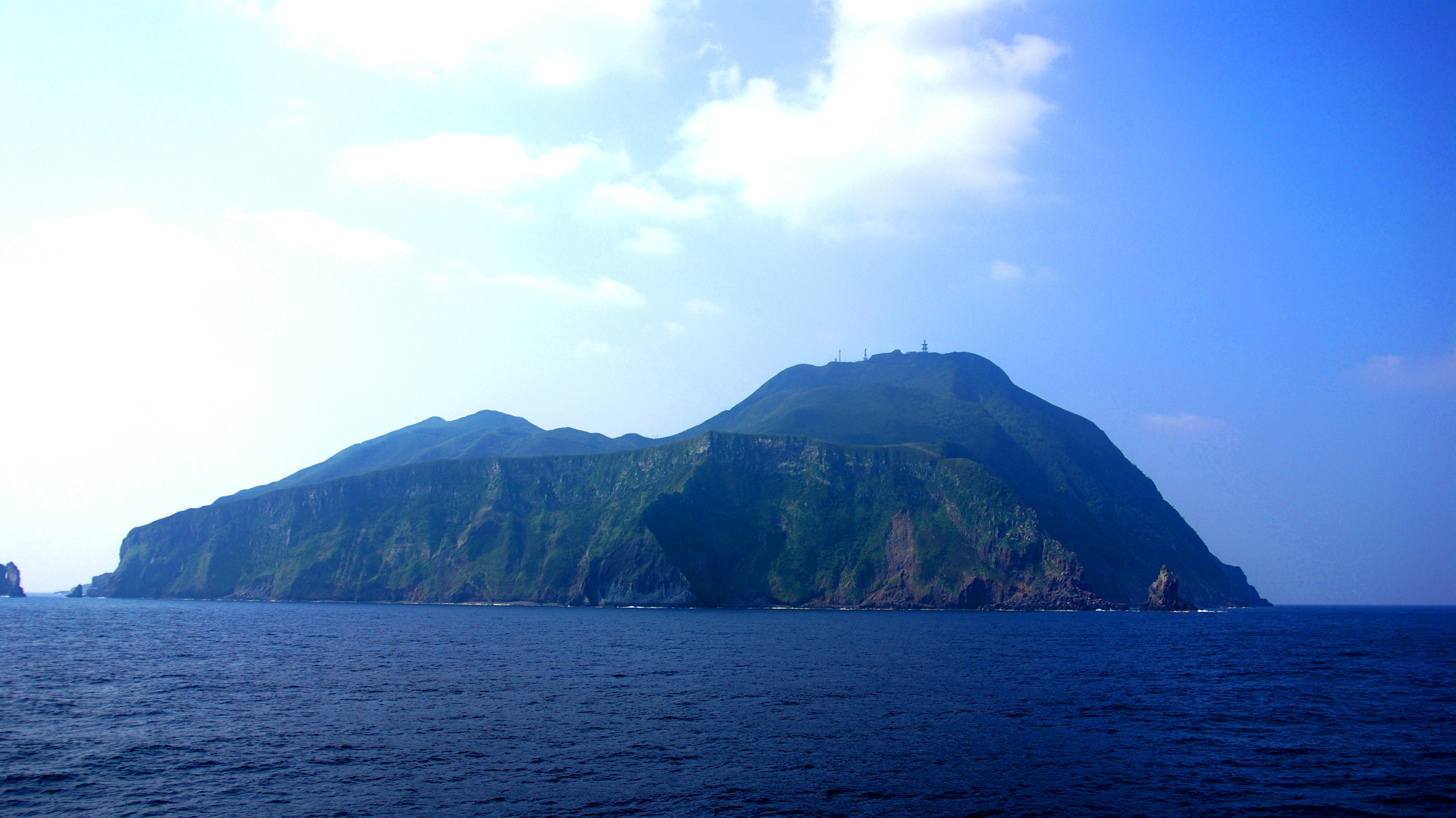
- Akusekijima, 2007

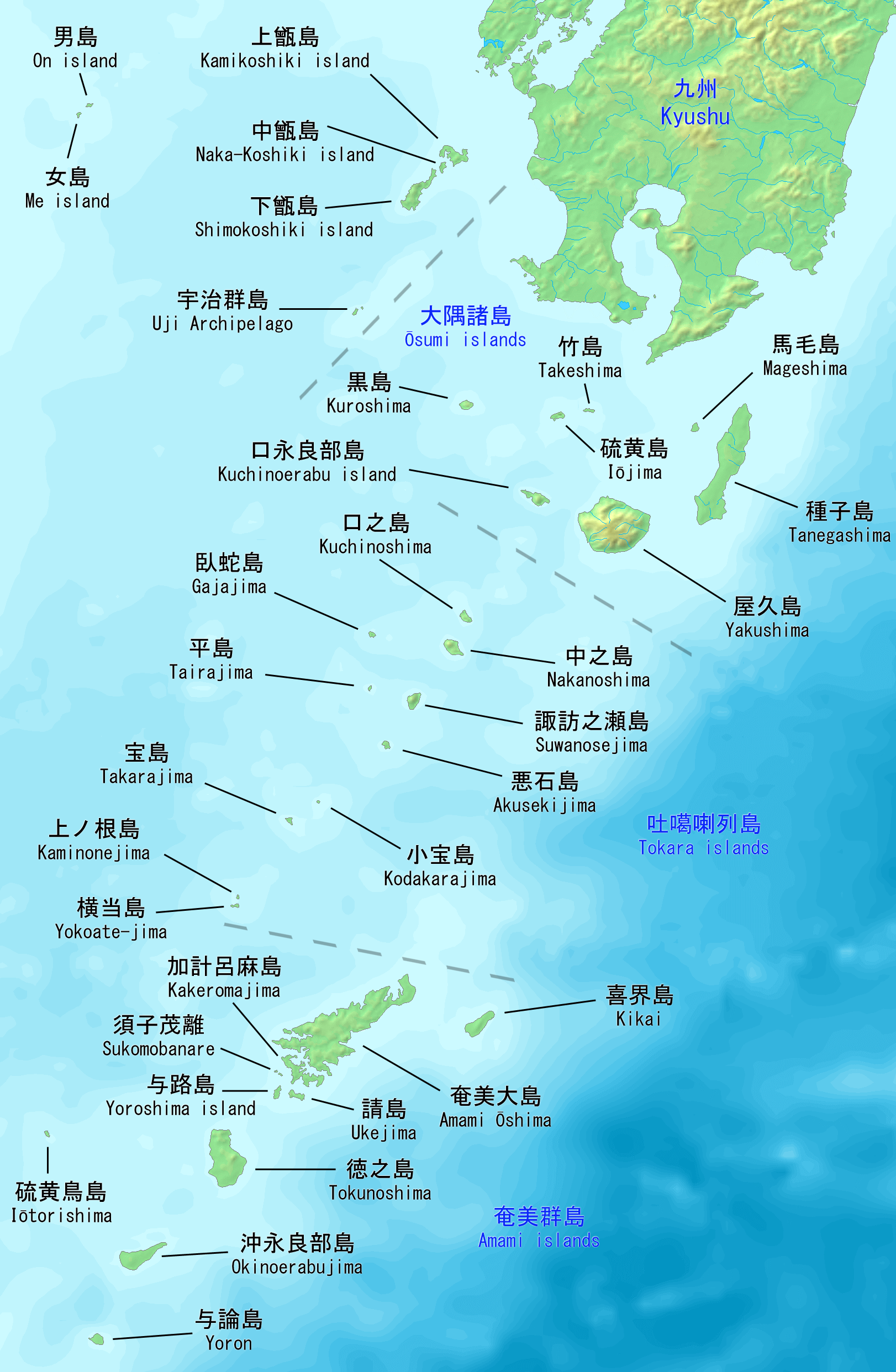
- Map of Kagoshima Prefecture. The Tokara Islands are the middle archipelago between Yakushima and Amami Oshima.

Geography
- Coordinates: 29.9667°N 129.917°E
- Adjacent to: Pacific Ocean
- Total islands: 12
- Area: 101.35 km^{2} (39.13 sq mi)

Administration
- Japan
- Prefectures: Kagoshima
- District: Kagoshima District
- Village: Toshima

Demographics
- Population: 664 (2025)
- Pop. density: 6.39/km^{2} (16.55/sq mi)
- Ethnic groups: Japanese

The Tokara Islands (吐噶喇列島, Tokara-rettō) are an archipelago in the Nansei Islands, and are part of the Satsunan Islands, which are, in turn, part of the Ryukyu Archipelago.

The 150-kilometre (93 mi)-long chain consists of twelve small islands located between Yakushima and Amami-Oshima. The islands have a total area of 101.35 square kilometres (39.13 sq mi). Administratively, the whole group belongs to Toshima Village, Kagoshima Prefecture, Japan. Only seven of the islands are permanently inhabited. The islands, especially Takarajima, are home to the Tokara horse.

== Etymology ==
One theory holds that the name "Tokara" was derived from tohara, or "distant sea area", as viewed from Okinawa. Another theory states that the name come from the Ainu word tokap, which means "breast". The southernmost inhabited island in the archipelago, Takarajima, has a mountain, Megamiyama (lit. Goddess Mountain) with such a shape. A third theory is that the name is a corruption of takara as in Takarajima.

== History ==
Mention is made in the Shoku Nihongi under an entry for the year 699 of an island called "Tokan", which is usually identified with Tokara, together with the islands of Tane, Yaku and Amami, although Tokan is also sometimes identified with Tokunoshima, an island approximately 150 kilometres (93 miles) away. Although an entry in the earlier Nihon Shoki, for the year 654, mentions a "Tokara Country", Tokara no kuni, it is a reference to the Tokhara region of Central Asia, rather than the Tokara Islands.

During the 15th and 16th centuries, the islands came under the control of the Shimazu clan of Satsuma Domain and the Ryukyu Kingdom. Ryukyu ceded its territory in the Tokara Islands to Satsuma in 1611, which was confirmed by the Tokugawa Shogunate in 1624.

In 1908, the islands were administratively organized into Jitto Village, literally "Ten Islands", of which seven were inhabited. After World War II, from 2 February 1946, all of the Satsunan islands south of 30th parallel of latitude, including the Tokara Islands, were placed under United States military administration as part of the Provisional Government of Northern Ryukyu Islands. However, the three northern inhabited islands in the archipelago, Iōjima, Kuroshima and Takeshima, remained under the control of Japan, and were placed under the administration of the village of Mishima. The remaining Tokara Islands reverted to Japan on 10 February 1952 and are now administered as the village of Toshima.

== Important Bird Area ==
The islands have been recognised as an Important Bird Area (IBA) by BirdLife International because they support populations of Japanese wood pigeons, Ryukyu green pigeons, Ijima's leaf-warblers, Izu thrushes and Ryukyu robins. In 2026 a new endemic bird was identified when it was discovered that the Tokara leaf-warbler is a distinct species from Ijima's leaf-warbler.

== Islands ==
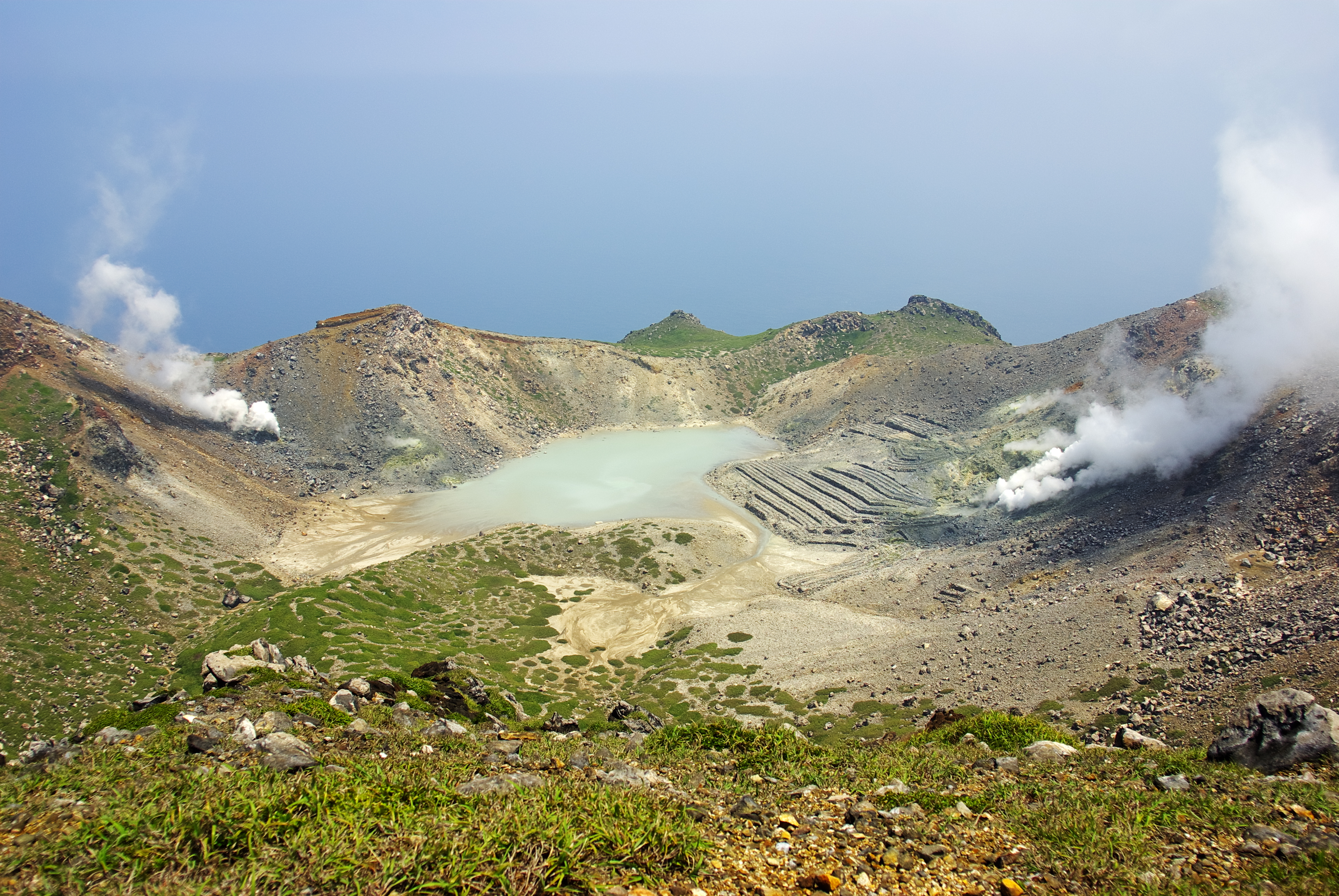
The crater on the highest peak (Otake) in Nakano-shima, 2007. The stripes on the right are a disused sulfur mine

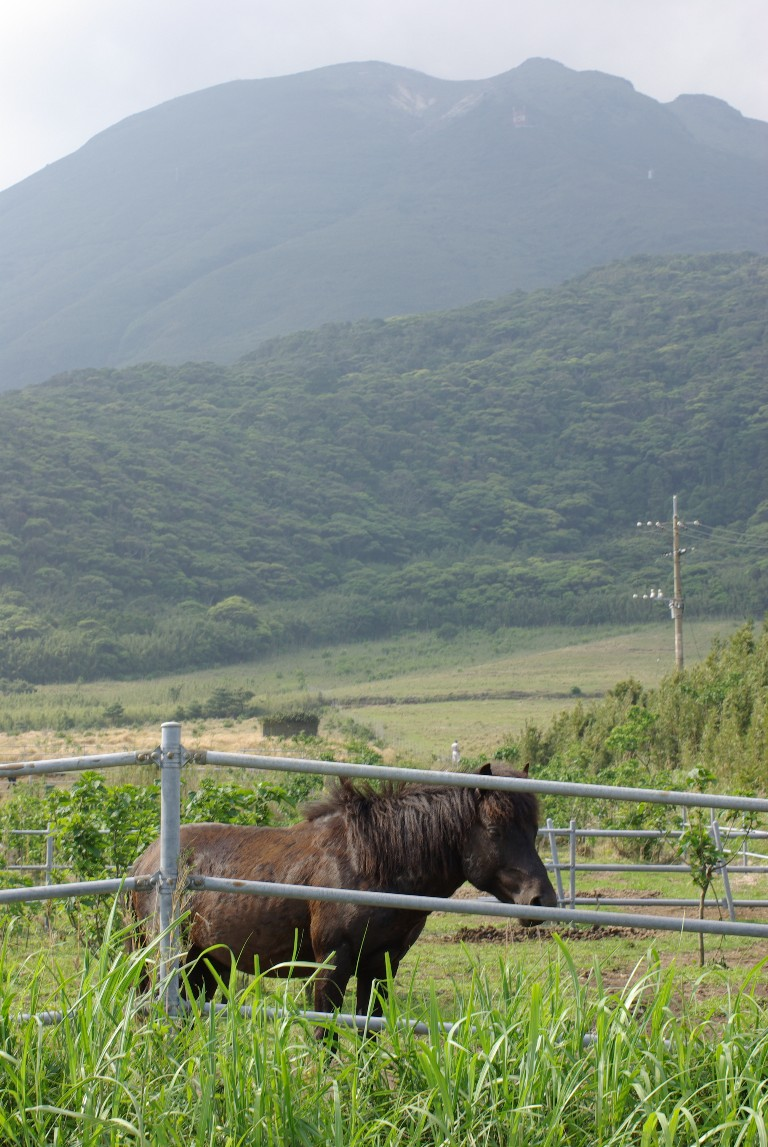
Tokara Pony

Photo	Name	Kanji	Area (km^{2})	Population 2025	highest point (m)	Peak	Coordinates
	Hirase			-			30°2′32.26″N 130°3′0.29″E (Toudai-Se)
	Kuchinoshima	口之島	13.33	97	628.5	Maedake	29°58′15″N 129°55′20″E
	Nakanoshima	中之島	34.47	132	979.0	Otake	29°50′30″N 129°52′30″E
	Gajajima	臥蛇島	4.07	–	497.2		29°54′11″N 129°32′30″E
	Kogajajima	小臥蛇島	0.5	–	301		29°52′48″N 129°37′15″E
	Tairajima	平島	2.08	79	245	Ontake	29°41′15″N 129°31′57″E
	Suwanosejima	諏訪之瀬島	27.66	84	796	Ontake	29°38′19″N 129°42′50″E
	Akusekijima	悪石島	7.49	89	584	Mitake	29°27′36″N 129°36′06″E
	Kojima	小島	0.36	–	56		29°13′40″N 129°20′45″E
	Kodakarajima	小宝島	1.00	67	102.7		29°13′26″N 129°19′34″E
	Takarajima	宝島	7.14	116	291.9	Imakira-dake	29°08′40″N 129°12′29″E
	Kaminonejima	上ノ根島	0.54	–	280		28°49′56″N 129°0′03″E
	Yokoate-jima	横当島	2.76	–	494.8	Higashimine	28°47′57″N 128°59′20″E
