= Circles of latitude between the 25th parallel north and the 30th parallel north =

Circles of latitude

Following are circles of latitude between the 25th parallel north and the 30th parallel north:

== 26th parallel north ==
26th parallel north (interactive map)

In Africa, the parallel defines part of the border between Western Sahara and Mauritania.

The 26th parallel north is a circle of latitude that is 26 degrees north of the Earth's equatorial plane. It crosses Africa, Asia, the Indian Ocean, the Pacific Ocean, North America, and the Atlantic Ocean.

A section of the border between Western Sahara and Mauritania is defined by the parallel.

It is the most populous parallel on Earth, being home to between 247.2 million and 248.0 million people as of 2019.

At this latitude the sun is visible for 13 hours, 46 minutes during the summer solstice and 10 hours, 31 minutes during the winter solstice. The sun is at 40.17 degrees in the sky during the winter solstice and 87.83 degrees in the sky during the summer solstice.

=== Around the world ===
Starting at the Prime Meridian and heading eastwards, the parallel 26° north passes through:

Coordinates	Country, territory or sea	Notes
26°0′N 0°0′E	Algeria	
26°0′N 9°32′E	Libya	
26°0′N 25°0′E	Egypt	
26°0′N 34°20′E	Red Sea	
26°0′N 36°42′E	Saudi Arabia	
26°0′N 50°4′E	Persian Gulf	Gulf of Bahrain
26°0′N 50°28′E	Bahrain	
26°0′N 50°38′E	Persian Gulf	Gulf of Bahrain
26°0′N 51°2′E	Qatar	
26°0′N 51°24′E	Persian Gulf	Passing between the islands of Bani Forur and Sirri, Iran; Passing between the Tunb Islands and the island of Abu Musa, controlled byIran but claimed by United Arab Emirates
26°0′N 56°4′E	United Arab Emirates	
26°0′N 56°10′E	Oman	Musandam peninsula
26°0′N 56°25′E	Indian Ocean	Gulf of Oman
26°0′N 57°14′E	Iran	
26°0′N 61°48′E	Pakistan	Balochistan; Sindh
26°0′N 70°5′E	India	Rajasthan; Madhya Pradesh; Uttar Pradesh; Bihar; West Bengal
26°0′N 88°9′E	Bangladesh	
26°0′N 89°32′E	India	West Bengal – for about 4 km
26°0′N 89°35′E	Bangladesh	
26°0′N 89°49′E	India	Assam; Meghalaya; Assam; Nagaland
26°0′N 95°8′E	Myanmar (Burma)	
26°0′N 98°36′E	China	Yunnan; Guizhou; Guangxi; Hunan (passing between Guangxi and Hunan several times); Jiangxi; Fujian — passing just south of Fuzhou
26°0′N 119°43′E	East China Sea	Passing just north of the disputed Senkaku Islands
26°0′N 127°40′E	Pacific Ocean	Passing just south of the island of Okinawa, Japan; Passing just north of the island of Kita Daito, Japan; Passing just south of Lisianski Island, Hawaii, United States; Passing just north of the atoll of Laysan, Hawaii, United States
26°0′N 112°12′W	Mexico	Baja California Sur
26°0′N 111°20′W	Gulf of California	
26°0′N 111°10′W	Mexico	Baja California Sur – Isla del Carmen
26°0′N 111°5′W	Gulf of California	
26°0′N 109°26′W	Mexico	Sinaloa; Chihuahua; Durango; Coahuila; Nuevo León; Tamaulipas - passing just south of Reynosa
26°0′N 97°39′W	United States	Texas - Passing through Brownsville
26°0′N 97°9′W	Gulf of Mexico	
26°0′N 81°45′W	United States	Florida – passing through Hollywood (between Fort Lauderdale and Miami)
26°0′N 80°7′W	Atlantic Ocean	
26°0′N 77°24′W	Bahamas	Island of Great Abaco
26°0′N 77°11′W	Atlantic Ocean	
26°0′N 14°30′W	Western Sahara	Claimed by Morocco and the Sahrawi Arab Democratic Republic
26°0′N 12°0′W	Western Sahara / Mauritania border	
26°0′N 8°40′W	Mauritania	
26°0′N 6°26′W	Algeria	

== 27th parallel north ==
27th parallel north (interactive map)

The 27th parallel north is a circle of latitude that is 27 degrees north of the Earth's equatorial plane. It crosses Africa, Asia, the Pacific Ocean, North America, and the Atlantic Ocean.

At this latitude the sun is visible for 13 hours, 51 minutes during the summer solstice and 10 hours, 26 minutes during the winter solstice.

=== Around the world ===
Starting at the Prime Meridian and heading eastwards, the parallel 27° north passes through:

Coordinates	Country, territory or sea	Notes
27°0′N 0°0′E	Algeria	
27°0′N 9°50′E	Libya	
27°0′N 25°0′E	Egypt	
27°0′N 33°54′E	Red Sea	
27°0′N 35°55′E	Saudi Arabia	
27°0′N 49°40′E	Persian Gulf	Passing just north of Lavan Island, Iran
27°0′N 53°21′E	Iran	
27°0′N 55°48′E	Persian Gulf	Passing just north of Qeshm island, Iran; Passing just south of Hormuz Island, Iran
27°0′N 56°54′E	Iran	
27°0′N 63°15′E	Pakistan	Balochistan; Sindh
27°0′N 69°31′E	India	Rajasthan; Uttar Pradesh; Bihar
27°0′N 84°51′E	Nepal	Birgunj
27°0′N 88°6′E	India	West Bengal
27°0′N 88°52′E	Bhutan	
27°0′N 92°5′E	India	Arunachal Pradesh - claimed by China; Assam; Arunachal Pradesh
27°0′N 95°48′E	Myanmar (Burma)	
27°0′N 98°44′E	China	Yunnan; Sichuan; Yunnan; Guizhou; Hunan (for about 4 km); Guizhou; Hunan - passing just north of Hengyang; Jiangxi - passing just south of Ji'an; Fujian
27°0′N 120°16′E	East China Sea	
27°0′N 127°56′E	Japan	Iheya island
27°0′N 127°56′E	Pacific Ocean	Passing just north of Okinawa Island, Japan; Passing just south of Yoronjima, Japan; Passing just south of Chichi-jima, Japan
27°0′N 114°2′W	Mexico	Baja California peninsula
27°0′N 112°1′W	Gulf of California	
27°0′N 109°57′W	Mexico	Passing just south of Navojoa and just north of Monclova
27°0′N 99°24′W	United States	Texas - mainland and Padre Island
27°0′N 97°23′W	Gulf of Mexico	
27°0′N 82°25′W	United States	Florida - Passing through Port Charlotte and Hobe Sound
27°0′N 80°5′W	Atlantic Ocean	
27°0′N 78°13′W	Bahamas	Great Sale Cay
27°0′N 78°12′W	Atlantic Ocean	Passing between the Fish Cays and the Pensacola Cays, Bahamas
27°0′N 13°27′W	Western Sahara	Claimed by Morocco
27°0′N 8°40′W	Mauritania	
27°0′N 8°9′W	Algeria	

== 28th parallel north ==
28th parallel north (interactive map)

In Mexico the parallel defines the border between the states of Baja California and Baja California Sur.

The 28th parallel north is a circle of latitude that is 28 degrees north of the Earth's equatorial plane. It crosses Africa, Asia, the Pacific Ocean, North America, and the Atlantic Ocean.

In Mexico the parallel defines the border between the states of Baja California and Baja California Sur.

This parallel also passes through Mount Everest, the tallest mountain on Earth, passing just north of its summit.

At this latitude the sun is visible for 13 hours, 55 minutes during the summer solstice and 10 hours, 22 minutes during the winter solstice.

=== Around the world ===
Starting at the Prime Meridian and heading eastwards, the parallel 28° north passes through:

Coordinates	Country, territory or sea	Notes
28°0′N 0°0′E	Algeria	
28°0′N 9°55′E	Libya	
28°0′N 25°0′E	Egypt	
28°0′N 33°27′E	Red Sea	Gulf of Suez
28°0′N 33°48′E	Egypt	Sinai Peninsula - passing just north of Sharm El Sheikh
28°0′N 34°26′E	Red Sea	Straits of Tiran
28°0′N 34°30′E	Saudi Arabia	Island of Tiran
28°0′N 34°33′E	Red Sea	
28°0′N 35°10′E	Saudi Arabia	
28°0′N 48°46′E	Persian Gulf	
28°0′N 51°20′E	Iran	
28°0′N 62°47′E	Pakistan	Balochistan; Sindh; Punjab
28°0′N 70°21′E	India	Rajasthan
28°0′N 70°35′E	Pakistan	Punjab
28°0′N 71°54′E	India	Rajasthan; Haryana; Rajasthan; Haryana; Uttar Pradesh
28°0′N 81°38′E	Nepal	
28°0′N 85°57′E	China	Tibet - for about 14 km
28°0′N 86°5′E	Nepal	For about 11 km
28°0′N 86°12′E	China	Tibet - for about 30 km
28°0′N 86°30′E	Nepal	Mount Everest lies on the parallel as it crosses from Nepal to China
28°0′N 86°53′E	China	Tibet
28°0′N 88°25′E	India	Sikkim
28°0′N 88°50′E	China	Tibet
28°0′N 88°27′E	Bhutan	
28°0′N 91°0′E	China	Tibet - for about 15 km
28°0′N 91°9′E	Bhutan	
28°0′N 91°27′E	China	Tibet
28°0′N 92°43′E	India	Arunachal Pradesh
28°0′N 97°23′E	Myanmar (Burma)	
28°0′N 98°8′E	China	Yunnan; Sichuan; Yunnan; Sichuan; Yunnan; Sichuan; Guizhou; Hunan; Jiangxi; Fujian; Zhejiang - passing through Wenzhou
28°0′N 120°57′E	East China Sea	
28°0′N 129°5′E	Pacific Ocean	Passing through the Amami Islands, Japan; Passing just north of the Bonin Islands, Japan; Passing just south of Midway Atoll, United States Minor Outlying Islands; Passing just north of Pearl and Hermes Atoll, Hawaii, United States; Passing just south of Cedros Island, Mexico
28°0′N 114°12′W	Mexico	Baja California/Baja California Sur border
28°0′N 112°46′W	Gulf of California	
28°0′N 111°10′W	Mexico	Passing 4 km north of Guaymas
28°0′N 100°0′W	United States	Texas - mainland and San José Island
28°0′N 96°54′W	Gulf of Mexico	
28°0′N 82°50′W	United States	Florida - island of Clearwater Beach and the mainland
28°0′N 80°31′W	Atlantic Ocean	Passing just south of the island of La Gomera, Spain
28°0′N 16°42′W	Spain	Island of Tenerife
28°0′N 16°38′W	Atlantic Ocean	
28°0′N 15°49′W	Spain	Island of Gran Canaria
28°0′N 15°22′W	Atlantic Ocean	Passing just south of the island of Fuerteventura, Spain
28°0′N 12°32′W	Morocco	
28°0′N 8°40′W	Algeria	

=== 28th parallel north in popular culture ===
- Twenty Eighth Parallel, by Vangelis, from the album Conquest of Paradise.

== 29th parallel north ==
29th parallel north (interactive map)

The 29th parallel north is a circle of latitude that is 29 degrees north of the Earth's equatorial plane. It crosses Africa, Asia, the Pacific Ocean, North America, and the Atlantic Ocean.

At this latitude the sun is visible for 14 hours, 0 minutes during the summer solstice and 10 hours, 18 minutes during the winter solstice. The northernmost extremity in which the moon can pass through the zenith at some point during the 18.6 year Saros cycle lies slightly south of this parallel.

=== Around the world ===
Starting at the Prime Meridian and heading eastwards, the parallel 29° north passes through:

Coordinates	Country, territory or sea	Notes
29°0′N 0°0′E	Algeria	
29°0′N 9°52′E	Libya	
29°0′N 25°0′E	Egypt	
29°0′N 32°37′E	Red Sea	Gulf of Suez
29°0′N 33°11′E	Egypt	Sinai Peninsula
29°0′N 34°41′E	Red Sea	Gulf of Aqaba
29°0′N 34°52′E	Saudi Arabia	
29°0′N 47°27′E	Kuwait	
29°0′N 48°10′E	Persian Gulf	
29°0′N 50°56′E	Iran	
29°0′N 61°31′E	Pakistan	Balochistan; Punjab
29°0′N 72°51′E	India	Rajasthan; Haryana; Uttar Pradesh; Uttarakhand
29°0′N 80°8′E	Nepal	
29°0′N 84°9′E	China	Tibet
29°0′N 94°10′E	India	Arunachal Pradesh - claimed by China
29°0′N 96°11′E	China	Tibet, for about 12 km (7.5 mi)
29°0′N 96°18′E	India	Arunachal Pradesh - for about 17 km (11 mi), claimed by China
29°0′N 96°29′E	China	Tibet; Yunnan (for about 14 km (8.7 mi)); Sichuan; Chongqing; Guizhou; Chongqing (for about 10 km (6.2 mi)); Guizhou; Chongqing; Hunan; Jiangxi; Zhejiang
29°0′N 121°41′E	East China Sea	Passing between the islands of Kaminonejima (at 28°50′N 129°00′E) and Takarajima (at 29°7′N 129°13′E), Japan
29°0′N 129°7′E	Pacific Ocean	
29°0′N 118°23′W	Mexico	Guadalupe Island
29°0′N 118°18′W	Pacific Ocean	
29°0′N 114°36′W	Mexico	Baja California
29°0′N 113°33′W	Gulf of California	
29°0′N 113°8′W	Mexico	Isla Ángel de la Guarda (southernmost tip, for about 2 km (1.2 mi))
29°0′N 113°7′W	Gulf of California	
29°0′N 112°30′W	Mexico	Tiburón Island and the mainland - Sonora: passing just south of Hermosillo, Chihuahua
29°0′N 103°17′W	United States	Texas - for about 17 km (11 mi)
29°0′N 103°7′W	Mexico	Coahuila
29°0′N 100°39′W	United States	Texas
29°0′N 95°13′W	Gulf of Mexico	
29°0′N 89°22′W	United States	Mississippi River Delta, Louisiana
29°0′N 89°9′W	Gulf of Mexico	
29°0′N 82°46′W	United States	Florida
29°0′N 80°52′W	Atlantic Ocean	Passing just north of the island of La Palma (at 28°51′N 17°54′W), Spain
29°0′N 13°49′W	Spain	Island of Lanzarote
29°0′N 13°29′W	Atlantic Ocean	
29°0′N 10°33′W	Morocco	
29°0′N 8°14′W	Algeria	

== 30th parallel north ==
30th parallel north (interactive map)

The 30th parallel north is a circle of latitude that is 30 degrees north of the Earth's equatorial plane. It stands one-third of the way between the equator and the North Pole and crosses Africa, Asia, the Pacific Ocean, North America, and the Atlantic Ocean. The parallel is used in some contexts to delineate Europe or what is associated with the continent of Europe as a southernmost limit, e.g. to qualify for membership of the European Broadcasting Union.

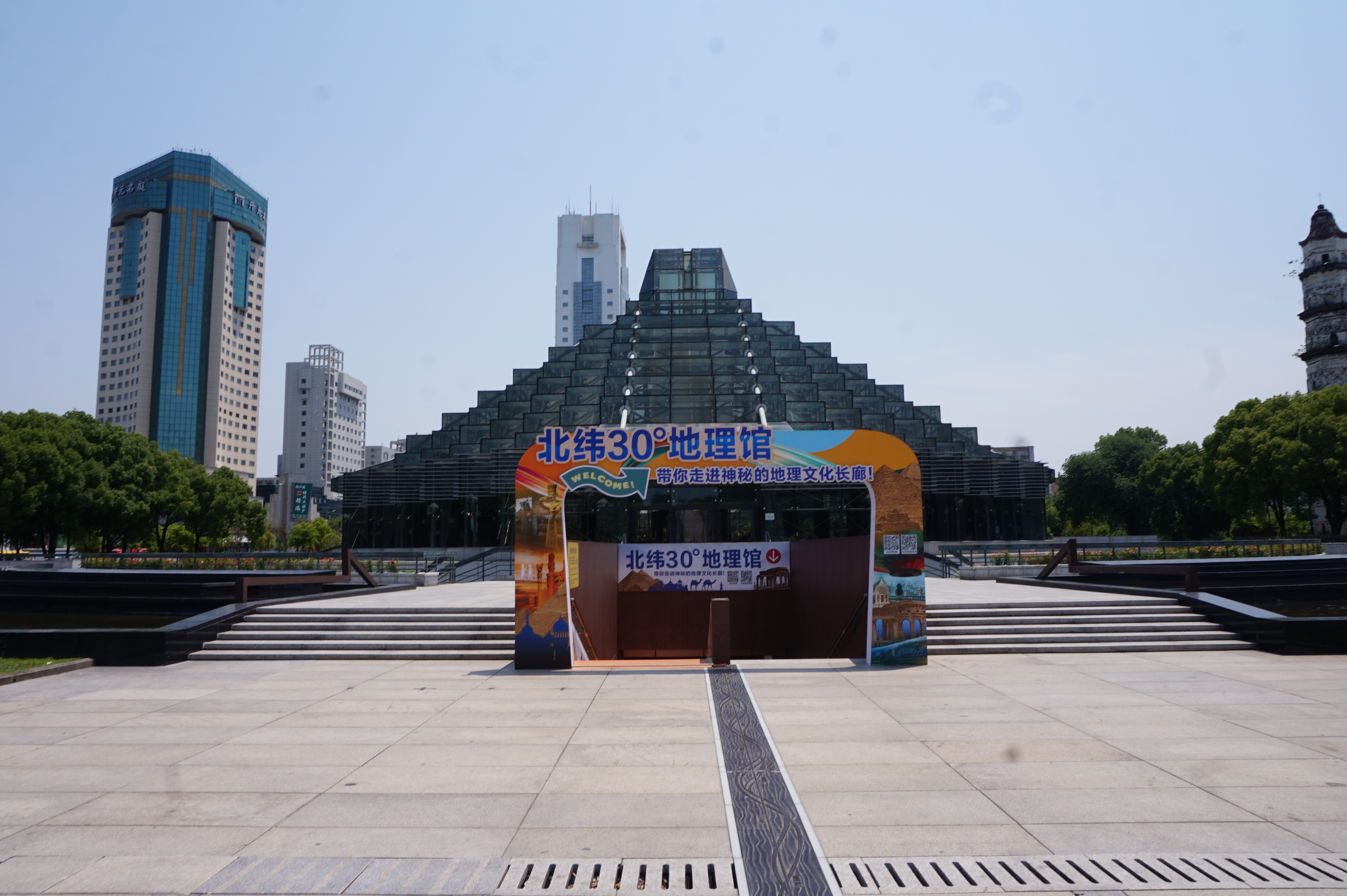
30 Degrees North Latitude Exhibition Hall in Yuecheng, Shaoxing, Zhejiang, China

It is the approximate southern border of the horse latitudes in the Northern Hemisphere, meaning that much of the land area touching the 30th parallel is arid or semi-arid. If there is a source of wind from a body of water the area would more likely be humid subtropical. If Earth were a perfect sphere, this would be the parallel that divides the Northern Hemisphere's surface area in half. However due to Earth's oblateness, the true latitude that does so lies a little bit to the south.

This latitude forms the dividing line between the Lahore and Karachi flight information regions in Pakistan.

At this latitude the sun is visible for 14 hours, 5 minutes during the summer solstice and 10 hours, 13 minutes during the winter solstice, and the nighttime duration lasts 9 hours, 55 minutes during the summer solstice and 13 hours, 47 minutes during the winter solstice. On 21 June, the maximum altitude of the sun is 83.44 degrees and 36.56 degrees on 21 December.

At this latitude:

- One degree of longitude = 96.49 km or 59.95 mi
- One minute of longitude = 1.61 km or 1.00 mi
- One second of longitude = 26.80 m or 87.93 ft

=== Around the world ===
Starting at the Prime Meridian and heading eastwards, the parallel 30° north passes through:

Coordinates	Country, territory or sea	Notes
30°0′N 0°0′E	Algeria	
30°0′N 9°28′E	Libya	
30°0′N 24°56′E	Egypt	Passing just south of Cairo
30°0′N 34°32′E	Israel	Passing just north of Kibbutz Lotan
30°0′N 35°11′E	Jordan	
30°0′N 38°0′E	Saudi Arabia	Passing through Sakakah
30°0′N 43°38′E	Iraq	
30°0′N 47°9′E	Kuwait	Mainland and Warbah Island
30°0′N 48°9′E	Persian Gulf	
30°0′N 48°16′E	Iraq	
30°0′N 48°27′E	Iran	
30°0′N 48°40′E	Persian Gulf	
30°0′N 49°33′E	Iran	For about 2 km
30°0′N 49°34′E	Persian Gulf	
30°0′N 50°9′E	Iran	
30°0′N 61°0′E	Afghanistan	
30°0′N 66°19′E	Pakistan	Balochistan; Punjab
30°0′N 73°33′E	India	Rajasthan; Punjab; Haryana; Uttar Pradesh; Uttarakhand
30°0′N 80°43′E	Nepal	
30°0′N 82°30′E	China	Tibet; Sichuan; Chongqing; Hubei; Hunan; Hubei; Anhui; Jiangxi; Anhui; Zhejiang — passing through Shaoxing
30°0′N 121°38′E	East China Sea	Hangzhou Bay
30°0′N 121°50′E	China	Zhejiang (islands of Jintang, Zhoushan and Mount Putuo)
30°0′N 122°24′E	East China Sea	Hangzhou Bay
30°0′N 129°55′E	Japan	Island of Kuchinoshima
30°0′N 129°55′E	Pacific Ocean	
30°0′N 115°48′W	Mexico	Baja California
30°0′N 114°32′W	Gulf of California	
30°0′N 112°44′W	Mexico	Sonora; Chihuahua
30°0′N 104°41′W	United States	Texas — passes through Houston as well as through the George Bush Intercontinental Airport; Louisiana — passes through New Orleans
30°0′N 89°27′W	Gulf of Mexico	
30°0′N 88°50′W	United States	Louisiana - Chandeleur Islands
30°0′N 88°50′W	Gulf of Mexico	
30°0′N 85°30′W	United States	Florida
30°0′N 84°22′W	Gulf of Mexico	Apalachee Bay
30°0′N 83°51′W	United States	Florida — passes just north of St. Augustine
30°0′N 81°19′W	Atlantic Ocean	
30°0′N 16°02′W	Portugal	Passes just south of the Savage Islands
30°0′N 9°43′W	Morocco	
30°0′N 5°8′W	Algeria	

== See also ==
- Circles of latitude between the 20th parallel north and the 25th parallel north
- Circles of latitude between the 30th parallel north and the 35th parallel north
- Circles of latitude between the 25th parallel south and the 30th parallel south
- Subtropical ridge
