= Takarajima =

Island within the Ryukyu Islands

Native name: Japanese: 宝島
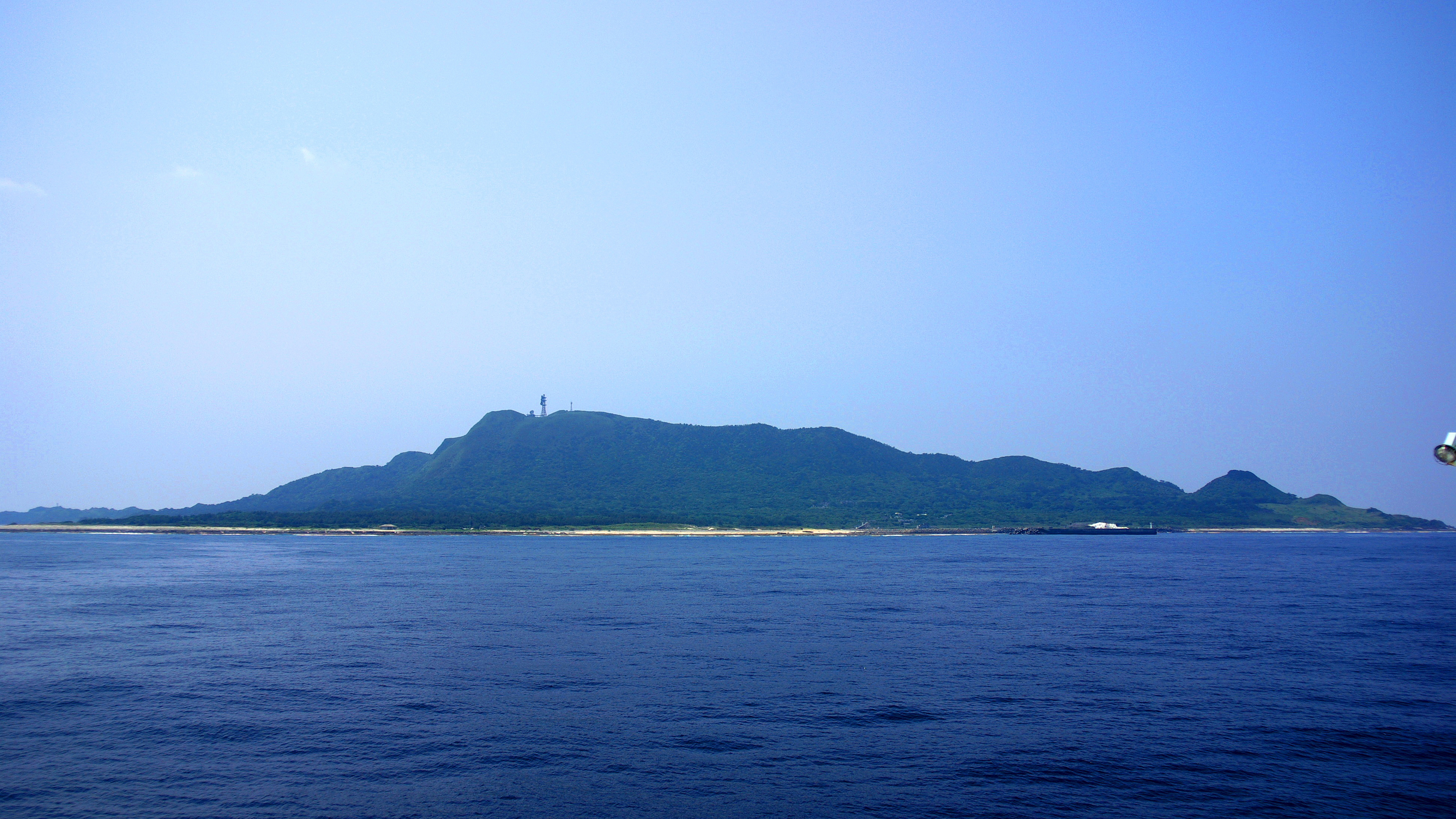

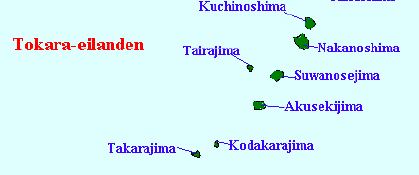

Geography
- Location: East China Sea
- Coordinates: 29°08′N 129°12′E
- Archipelago: Tokara Islands
- Area: 7.14 km^{2} (2.76 sq mi)
- Coastline: 13.77 km (8.556 mi)
- Highest elevation: 291.9 m (957.7 ft)
- Highest point: Imakiradake

Administration
- Japan
- Kagoshima Prefecture

Demographics
- Population: 124 (2024)
- Pop. density: 16.25/km^{2} (42.09/sq mi)
- Ethnic groups: Japanese

Takarajima (宝島), literally "treasure island", is one of the Tokara Islands, belonging to Kagoshima Prefecture. The island, 7.14 km² in area, had a population of 147 persons as of 2020 census data. The island can be reached only by boat as it has no airport, though there is a helipad that may be used in emergencies. There is regular ferry service to the city of Kagoshima on the mainland of Kyushu, and the city of Nase on the island of Amami Ōshima. Travel time to the mainland is about 13 hours while it is only about 3 hours to Amami. The islanders are dependent mainly on fishing and seasonal tourism.

== Geography ==
Takarajima is the southernmost inhabited island in the Tokara archipelago, and is located 366 kilometres (198 nmi) from Kagoshima Port and 90 kilometres (49 nmi) north from Amami Ōshima. The highest peak, Imakiradake has a height of 292 metres (958 ft) above sea level The island is surrounded by a coral reef. Its climate is classified as subtropical, with a rainy season from May through September. The plant hardiness zone is 11a.

== History ==
Numerous ceramic shards and the foundations of dwellings from the late Jōmon period and Yayoi period indicate that Takarajima has been continuously inhabited for at least the past 2000 years. Until 1624, the island was part of the Ryukyu Kingdom.

During the Edo period, Takarajima was part of Satsuma Domain and was administered as part of Kawabe District. In August 1824, a British ship violated Japan’s national seclusion policy and sent a landing party of 20-30 men, who attempted to steal cattle from the islanders. In the ensuing conflict, one British sailor was killed. The incident was one of the contributing factors to the Tokugawa Shogunate issuing the Edict to Repel Foreign Vessels in 1825. The incident was also the subject of a novel by modern writer Akira Yoshimura.

In 1896, the island was transferred to the administrative control of Ōshima District, Kagoshima, and from 1911 was part of the village of Toshima, Kagoshima. From 1946-1952, the island was administered by the United States as part of the Provisional Government of Northern Ryukyu Islands.
