= Nostradamus in popular culture =

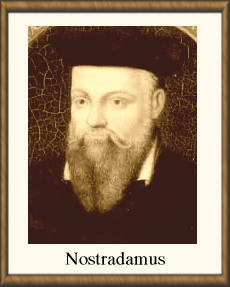
Estant assis de nuict secret estude, Seul repousé sus la selle d'aerain; Flambe exigue sortant de solitude Faict proferer qui n'est à croire vain. (Century I.1, 1555)

The prophecies of the 16th-century author Nostradamus have become a part of the popular culture of the 20th and 21st centuries. Nostradamus' life has been depicted in both fiction and non-fiction books as well as several films, and made-up prophecies that were said to be his were circulated online in several well-known hoaxes, where quatrains in the style of Nostradamus have been circulated by e-mail. The best-known hoax claims that he predicted the attack on New York City's World Trade Center on September 11, 2001.

== Supposed prophecies ==
Nostradamus enthusiasts regularly make claims regarding each new world crisis as it comes along as there is a tendency to claim that "Nostradamus predicted whatever has just happened." These claims rely heavily on the role of interpretation. For example, they have often credited him with predicting numerous different events in world history, supposedly including the French Revolution, the rise of Napoleon Bonaparte, the atomic bomb, the rise of Adolf Hitler, the September 11 attacks on the World Trade Center, and the last pope.

=== Great King out of the Sky ===
One well-known supposed prophecy is that "a great and terrifying leader would come out of the sky" in 1999 and 7 months "to resuscitate the great King from Angoumois." But the phrase d'effraieur (of terror) in fact occurs nowhere in the original printing, which merely uses the word deffraieur (defraying, hosting), and Nostradamus sometimes uses the word ciel simply to mean 'region', rather than 'sky'. On the basis of Nostradamus' by now well-known technique of projecting past events into the future, Lemesurier suggests that X.72 therefore refers to the restoration to health of the captive Francis I of France (who was Duke of Angoulême) following a surprise visit to his cell by his host, the then Holy Roman Emperor Charles V in 1525. No fewer than five of the planets were in the same signs on both occasions.

Author and researcher Ove von Spaeth on his work Nostradamus, the New Millennium and the Basilisk notes that "numerous attempts of interpretation" of Nostradamus texts do not take into consideration that he was also an astrologer. Von Spaeth also denotes that the interpretation of deffraieur as "horror" is misleading, and suggests a new approach to interpret the text:

The Nostradamus words, roy de deffraieur is a special, old French spelling of 'the king of the horrible'. If the word is changed a tiny bit, e.g. def(f)rayer - meaning something financial, 'to lend money', 'to exempt from expenses', as well as something entirely different, i.e. 'to be the subject/matter/entertainment in a conversation', a new possibility appears. People who have tried to interpret his prophecies have had problems in fitting this in, unless they have suggested a financial world crisis.

=== September 11, 2001 ===
The September 11, 2001, attacks on New York City's World Trade Center led to immediate speculation as to whether Nostradamus had predicted the event. Almost as soon as the event had happened, the relevant Internet sites were deluged with inquiries. In response, Nostradamus enthusiasts started searching for a Nostradamus quatrain that could be said to have done so, coming up with interpretations of Quatrains I.87, VI.97 and X.72. However, the various ways in which the enthusiasts chose to interpret the text were not supported by experts on the subject. In addition, Nostradamus himself in his dedicatory letter to King Henri II states that his prophecies were about Europe, North Africa, and part of Asia Minor only.

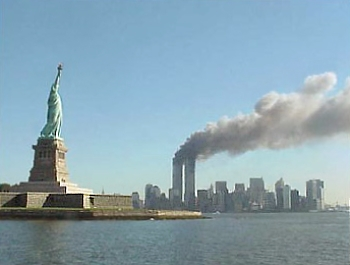
Lower Manhattan, September 11, 2001

The nearest that the former could come up with was quatrain VI.97, which in the original 1557 edition ran:

Cinq & quarante degrés ciel bruslera,
Feu approucher de la grand cité neufve,
Instant grand flamme esparse saultera,
Quant on voudra des Normans faire preuve :

With instant evidently a version of the Latin instanter ("violently, vehemently"), a reasonable English translation (after Lemesurier) would thus appear to be:

Five and forty degrees, the sky shall burn:
To the great new city shall the fire draw nigh.
With vehemence the flames shall spread and churn
When with the Normans they conclusions try.

"Five and forty degrees" was said to be the latitude of New York City (New York's latitude is 40°47'), and was interpreted as "40.5 degrees" (even though the decimal point had not yet come into use in the Europe of Nostradamus' day, and in any case 40°47' is 40.78°). "New City", similarly, was claimed to be New York (even though Nostradamus refers in this way to various "New Cities" whose names, unlike "New York", literally mean "New City", and especially Naples – from Greek Neapolis, "new city"); and most of the attempts to fit in the "Normans" of line 4 seemed contrived at best. While it is true that New York State, which has the same name as New York City, crosses 45° latitude, it cannot, of course, be described as a "new city", and so doesn't fit line 2 of the verse.

Lemesurier suggests that the verse is merely an undated projection into the future of the capture of Naples by the Normans in 1139 during a year marked by a notably violent eruption of nearby Mount Vesuvius that is recorded in the contemporary Annales Cassini. In this case, the first expression may simply be a version of

Cinq[ante minutes] & quarante degrés

– which is indeed the latitude of Naples.

Another quatrain which came under the scrutiny of enthusiasts was quatrain I.87, which in the original 1555 edition (Albi copy) ran:

Ennosigée feu du centre de terre
Fera trembler au tour de cité neufve:
Deux grands rochiers long temps feront la guerre
Puis Arethusa rougira nouveau fleuve.

or, in a possible English translation:

Earth-shaking fires from the world's centre roar:
Around "New City" is the earth a-quiver.
Two nobles long shall wage a fruitless war,
The nymph of springs pour forth a new, red river.

Here, once again, the cité neufve was claimed to be New York; au tour de had to refer to the Twin Towers (even though, in French, the word tour in the masculine – as it is here – has absolutely nothing to do with towers, but is part of a phrase meaning "around"); the Deux grands rochiers had to be the Twin Towers themselves; and Arethusa was said to be an anagram of "the USA". Once again, however, a rather more sober investigation by Brind'Amour had already revealed (bearing in mind that, in French, faire la guerre aux rochers, or "to make war on the rocks", simply means "to struggle fruitlessly") that the reference was probably to Naples and its nearby volcano. Subsequent investigation by Lemesurier and his colleague Gary Somai suggested that it applied particularly to the Annales Cassini's report of its lava eruption of 1036, at a time when the Lombards of Capua and the Byzantine dukes of Naples were constantly at war over the city prior to the decisive intervention of the Normans. For 968, similarly, Leo Marsicanus had reported in the same annals that "Mount Vesuvius exploded into flames and sent out huge quantities of sticky, sulfurous matter that formed a river rushing down to the sea". Thus, given that Arethusa was the classical nymph of springs and rivers, with a well-known "spring of Arethusa" still visible today in the Sicilian port of Syracuse, the case for a "9/11" interpretation was evidently unfounded.

The Julian Calendar was indeed the calendar system used during Nostradamus' lifetime. In his Almanachs, Nostradamus published at least eleven Julian calendars of his own – but all of them in fact started on January 1, and in all of them the seventh month was consequently July. Lemesurier consequently suggests that X.72 does not predict the 9/11 attacks at all, but refers back to the allegedly "miraculous" restoration to health of the captive Francis I of France in August 1525 by his then Roy deffraieur ("host-king") Charles V, and then projects it forwards into the future as a prophecy.

As for the various interpretations of the line usually rendered as "To resuscitate the great king of the Mongols", the verse in fact contains no such line (the word mongolais which, since Leoni [1961] has often been proposed as an anagram for Angolmois, doesn't exist in French anymore), but merely refers to the well-known French region of Angoumois, of whose capital (Angoulême) Francis I was duke: he was thus, as the verse states, Le grand Roy d'Angolmois ("the great King from Angoumois") of Nostradamus's own day.

In these and other ways, Nostradamus's statement in his open letter to his son Cesar that his quatrains were "written in a nebulous rather than plainly prophetic form" is widely taken by enthusiasts as carte blanche for suggesting that they can mean almost anything that they want them to say.

== Hoaxes ==
=== "Mabus" as Antichrist ===
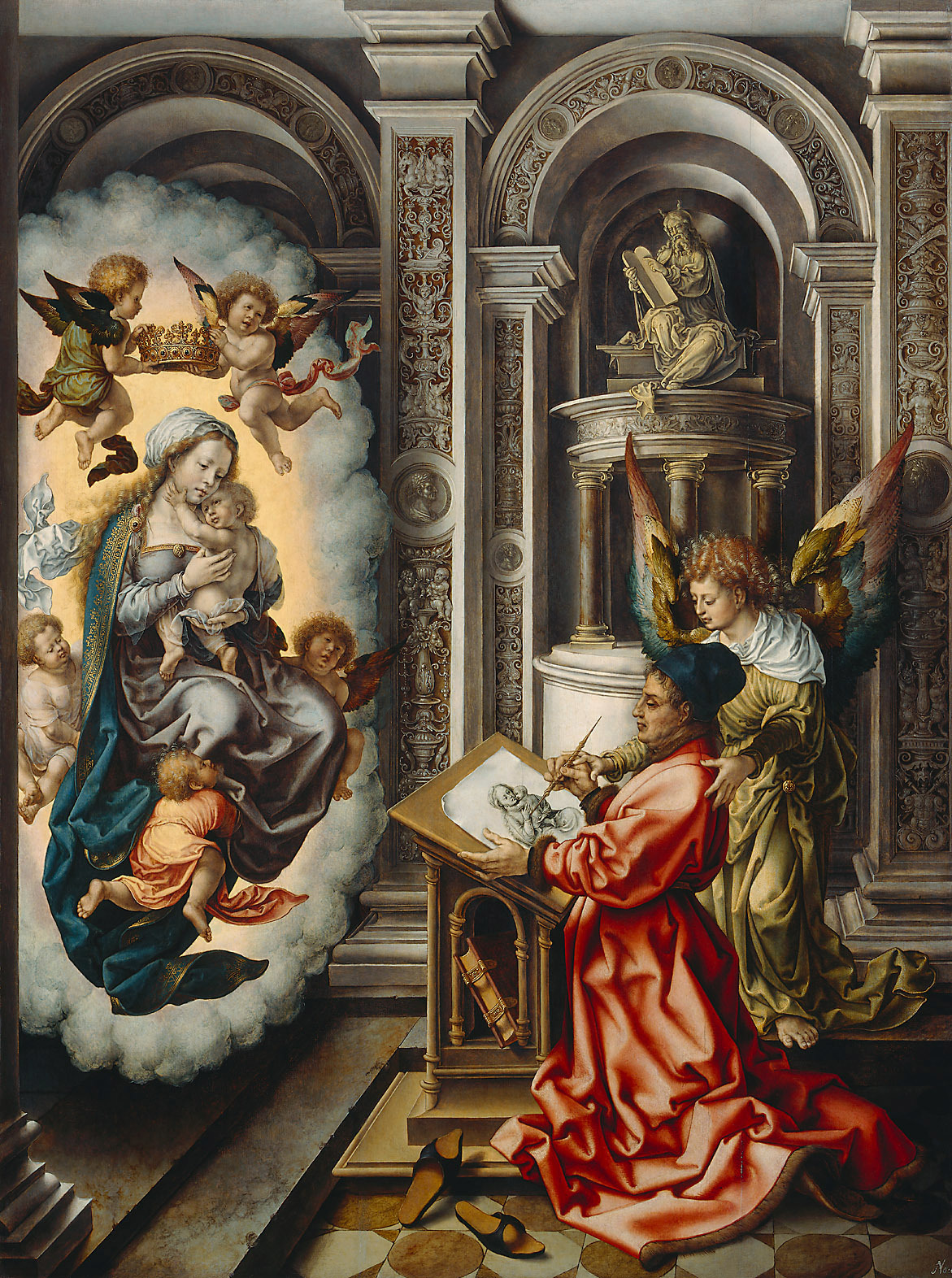
St Luke Painting the Madonna by Jan Mabuse

Some have interpreted the writings as predicting a series of three antichrists. However, the name "Mabus" as a synonym for or embodiment of the third antichrist is allegedly not suggested by any of the Prophecies. In fact the verse in question (II.62) merely states that a character of a similar-sounding name (according to Lemesurier [op. cit.], an alleged reference to the Flemish painter Jan Mabuse, contemporary with Nostradamus) will die. Otherwise, the reference says nothing about what "Mabus" will do or what he will be like. However, parts of Nostradamus Quantrain 2.61-62 state that "Mars at the port of the arrow. Behind the river the ladder put to the fort, Points to fire great murder on the breach. Mabus then will soon die, there will come Of people and beasts a horrible rout."

More recently attempts have been made to link the name "Mabus" anagrammatically with "Obama", as previously with "Saddam", "Osama" and "Bush". This tendency to attempt to adapt quatrains to fit current events can be traced all the way back to Nostradamus' own time. However, Mabus is also acknowledged to be the surname of longtime U.S. political figure Ray Mabus.

One variant is that Mabus is the Crown Prince of Saudi Arabia, Mohamad bin Salman, who signs himself as MBS, which can be encrypted as the word Mabus.

=== Village idiot hoax ===
Following the contentious 2000 U.S. presidential election wherein George W. Bush was elected president, this text was widely circulated:

Come the millennium, month 12
In the home of greatest power
The village idiot will come forth
To be acclaimed the leader.

As with other hoaxes, only the purported English translation was given. It is likely that this verse was written as a joke.

=== World Trade Center prophecy hoax ===
Shortly after the September 11 attacks on the World Trade Center, the following spoof text was circulated on the Internet, along with many more elaborate variants (one of them signed 'Nostradamus 1654' – when he would have been 150 years old):

In the City of God there will be a great thunder,
Two brothers torn apart by Chaos,
while the fortress endures,
the great leader will succumb,
The third big war will begin when the big city is burning.

As it turns out, the first four lines were indeed written before the attacks, but by a Canadian graduate student named Neil Marshall as part of a research paper in 1997. The research paper included this poem as an illustrative example of how the validity of prophecies is often exaggerated. For example, the phrases "City of God" (New York has never held the title, unlike how for instance Los Angeles is nicknamed the "City of Angels"; some versions of the text thus outright use "City of York" or "the New City"), "great thunder" (this could apply to many disasters), "Two brothers" (many things come in pairs), and "the great leader will succumb" are so vague as to be meaningless. The fifth line was added by an anonymous Internet user, completely ignoring the fact that Nostradamus wrote his Propheties in rhymed four-line decasyllables called quatrains. Nostradamus also never referred to a "third big war".

=== Psy hoax ===
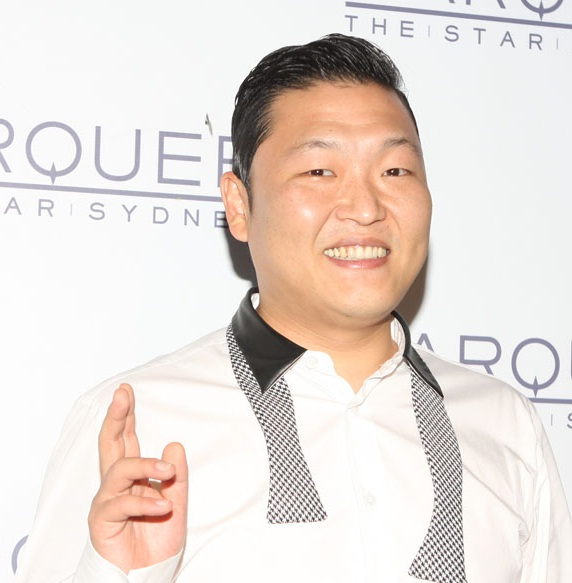
South Korean singer and rapper Psy

Towards mid-December 2012, an internet hoax related to South Korean singer and rapper Psy being one of the Four Horsemen of the Apocalypse was widely circulated around social media platforms. The hoax text, purportedly written by Nostradamus in 1503, is as follows:

From the calm morning,
the end will come
when of the dancing horse
the number of circles will be nine

"Calm morning" is said to be in reference to Psy's birth country – South Korea, derived from the characters for one of its older names, Joseon (조선/朝鮮). "Dancing horse" refers to Psy's Gangnam Style "dancing horse" routine, whereas the "nine circles" refer to the number of zeroes in one billion (1,000,000,000), which is nine. It was believed that once Psy's Gangnam Style video on YouTube amassed a billion views, the world would end.

The music video did reach one billion views on December 21, 2012, a popular date for which the world was predicted to end. However, the quatrain could not have been written by Nostradamus in 1503; he was born in December of that year.

== Political and military manipulation ==
During World War II, leaflets with false Nostradamus quatrains predicting the defeat of France were launched by German planes over European skies. It seems that this operation was mastered by Nazi political secretary Rudolf Hess, and that even Adolf Hitler believed in Nostradamus' quatrains. Certainly his propaganda Minister Joseph Goebbels did, under the influence of his wife Magda. Subsequently, the Allies responded in kind, both with air-dropped leaflets and via the American film Nostradamus Says So.

After Rudolf Hess left Nazi Germany in a solitary flight to Scotland, seeking a peace agreement with the United Kingdom, Hitler issued the Aktion Hess, a mandatory prosecution of any divinator or future-teller in all Nazi-occupied countries.

== Entertainment ==
=== Film ===
Nostradamus is the subject of many films and videos, including:

- Nostradamus (1925) Italian silent film directed by Mario Roncoroni.
- More About Nostradamus (1941) (Nominated for the 1941 Academy Awards in the Short Subject category)
- Nosutoradamusu no daiyogen (1974) Japanese film by Toshio Masuda.
- The Man Who Saw Tomorrow (1981), a documentary-style movie hosted and narrated by Orson Welles.
- Nostradamus (1994) depicts Nostradamus's rise in influence through his success in treating plague and his predictions, culminating in his appointment as court physician to Charles IX of France, son of Henry II of France.
- Before Twilight (2008) Polish film directed by Jacek Bławut.
- Farewell to Nostradamus is an anime film based around the prophecies of Nostradamus.
- Nostradamus is mentioned in the 1985 Italian horror film Demoni, directed by Lamberto Bava and produced by Dario Argento. According to the characters of the film shown at the fictional Metropol movie theater, Nostradamus predicted the spawning of demons that will "spread pestilence" and be "instruments of evil".

=== Television ===
The television series Alias prominently features the character Milo Rambaldi, a fictional prophet who seems to be an amalgam of Nostradamus and the non-prophetic but visionary inventor, artist, and genius Leonardo da Vinci.

In the science fiction series First Wave, the protagonists use a previously unknown book of quatrains of Nostradamus to fight back against an alien invasion.

Nostradamus was also a regular character on This Morning With Richard Not Judy, played by Emma Kennedy.

Nostradamus appeared semi-regularly on the Warner Bros. animated series Histeria! as an eccentric red-bearded man in stereotypical wizard garb.

On Mr. Show with Bob and David, an episode contains a sketch called "Nostradamus and his Companion". In it, Nostradamus (played by Bob Odenkirk) is a gay man who falls in love with a fashion designer, played by David Cross. Nostradamus is left behind by his constant chum, who goes on to achieve fame and fortune in the fashion industry. The sketch ends with a school being named after them: "Nostradamus and His Constant Chum Elementary School."

On Chappelle's Show, the sketch comedy show hosted by Dave Chappelle, there is a character named Negrodamus (played by comedian Paul Mooney), an African-American version of Nostradamus who makes various predictions in response to questions.

In the Nickelodeon cartoon CatDog, the titular characters find a prediction in a book by the fictitious prophet "Nostradummy" that they interpret as predicting the imminent end of the world.

In The Simpsons episode "Thank God, It's Doomsday", Homer Simpson is sarcastically called "Nostradumbass" by Comic Book Guy after his initial prophecy of the end of the world is incorrect.

In the Hong Kong ATV series My Date with a Vampire (series 1), Nostradamus, also referred to as the "French Guy", was held to have made a prophecy stating that the world would end in 1999, with a third of the world's population turning into monsters or vampires and the rest perishing. The antagonist, vampire Yamamoto Kazuo (portrayed by Kenneth Chan) and later Yu Meng Sap Sam or his true identity—Lo Hau (portrayed by Wai Lit), sought to make the prophecy come true and rule the world. However, the protagonists, Fong Tin Yau (portrayed by Eric Wan) and Ma Siu Ling (portrayed by Joey Meng), were able to stop this from occurring.

The anime Occult Academy revolves around an artifact called the Nostradamus Key, an object that will open a dimensional rift on July 21, 1999, and trigger an alien invasion in the year 2012. The survivors of the 2012 invasion seemingly used alien technology to send a person to tell Nostradamus as part of a plan to prevent the invasion.

Bob Bainborough portrayed Nostradamus in an episode of History Bites, appearing in an infomercial to sell his books, referencing C1Q35, among others, as an example of his prophecy. A two-hour documentary on Nostradamus first aired by the History Channel on 28 October 2007 suggests that a book of paintings in the National Library at Rome is The Lost Book of Nostradamus.

In The Sopranos episode "For All Debts Public and Private", Bobby Baccalieri mixes up Nostradamus with Quasimodo, saying that Quasimodo predicted 9/11 and the end of the world.

A teenaged clone of the original Nostradamus appears as a recurring character in the MTV animated show Clone High.

The Doctor Who Past Doctor Adventures novel The King of Terror features the Fifth Doctor and UNIT dealing with a group of terrorists called the Sons of Nostradamus who consider it their duty to ensure that his prophecies, which apparently predicted the end of the world in 1999, come true. However, the prophecies are eventually revealed to have been part of the efforts of an alien race known as the Canavatchi to halt humanity's development.

The History Channel periodically airs a series of films on supposedly apocalyptic prophecies under the general title The Nostradamus Effect. However, in his book 2012: It's Not the End of the World, Nostradamus specialist Peter Lemesurier describes the prophecies as 'largely fiction' and 'lurid nonsense'.

In Hetalia: Axis Powers, Germany and Japan worry about the end of the world due to one of Nostradamus's prophecies. However, Britain and France ignore this warning due to having lived through another supposed apocalypse, and instead tell Japan and Germany not to worry.

Nostradamus is featured in CW's drama Reign.

Nostradamus is featured in the Robot Chicken episode "Petless M in: Cars Are Couches of the Road", voiced by Alfred Molina.

Nostradamus was mentioned in an episode of Celebrity Deathmatch as the intended opponent for John Edward. However, he predicted he would lose the fight and refused to show up.

In season 14 episode 8 of Bob's Burgers, 'Wharf, Me Worry?', a new attraction at the park is called Clamstradamus, a talking clam shell that predicts the visitors' future. However, the children in the show obtain the microphone and make their own predictions. A major storyline in the episode involves 'Big Bob' being obsessed with the end of the world.

=== Books ===
Fiction

- In Phil Rickman's historical novel The Bones of Avalon, Nostradamus appears at the end as the major villain who must be opposed by the hero John Dee. The book describes his contemporary influence and depicts him as a master of propaganda and psychological warfare.
- In Alexander Kuprin's short story "The Blue Star", published in 1927, it is mentioned that Nostradamus has composed a horoscope for one of the main characters, a French prince.
- In Stephen King's 1986 novel It, Nostradamus's work is mentioned when a supernatural quake rocks the town of Derry (the fictional town in which the story is set) specifically knocking books of Nostradamus's quatrains from the library bookshelves and onto the floor.

=== Music ===
British singer/songwriter Al Stewart's album Past, Present and Future was a concept album including a song about every decade of the 20th century. As Stewart wrote the album in 1973, events from the latter years of the century were covered by the song "Nostradamus", in which some of the prophecies are quoted. One of the prophecies appears to refer to the future fall of the Berlin Wall and the unnatural death of a Pope named Pol; events which might have been considered predictable, even if the date was not.

1977 Moody Blues member Justin Hayward wrote a song on his album Songwriter called "Nostradamus".

Iron Maiden's "Die With Your Boots On" from the 1983 album Piece of Mind pokes fun at Nostradamus and his believers.

In 1984, Manfred Mann's Earth Band released the album Somewhere in Afrika, which contains a cover of the Al Stewart song, mistitled as "Eyes of Nostradamus".

Project Driver is a studio album by the heavy metal supergroup M.A.R.S., released in 1986 that contains the song "Nostradamus" about the prophet.

Composer Robert Steadman has twice used Nostradamus' prophecies in pieces of music: in 1987, quatrains by Nostradamus were juxtaposed with the Latin Requiem Mass text and poems on environmental issues. In 1999, he set what was thought by some to be Nostradamus's prediction of the end of the world for soprano and chamber ensemble in The Final Prophecy.

Nostradamus is briefly mentioned in the They Might Be Giants song "My Evil Twin" from their 1992 album Apollo 18.

The 1993 album The Window of Life by Pendragon includes a song entitled "Nostradamus (Stargazing)".

Haggard produced two albums dealing with the seer Michel de Notredame in the dark days of The Black Plague in Europe: And Thou Shalt Trust... the Seer in 1997 and Awaking the Centuries in 1998.

Darkane's Song "July 1999" from Rusted Angel, is about the Nostradamus dated prophecy.

Rapper Nas refers to himself as Nastradamus and released an album titled Nastradamus, along with its first single of the same name in 1999.

Bulgarian guitarist Nikolo Kotzev released a rock opera called Nikolo Kotzev's Nostradamus in 2001, based on the life and times of Nostradamus. In 2005, Dutch band Kayak released a rock opera called Nostradamus – Fate of Man.

German power metal band Helloween's 1996 album The Time of the Oath is based on Nostradamus' supposed prophecy of a world war between 1994 and 2000.

In 1997, Finnish metal band Stratovarius recorded Visions, a concept album loosely based on the life and prophecies of Nostradamus.

In 2008, the British heavy metal band Judas Priest released a concept album based on the life of Nostradamus. Simply named Nostradamus, the album itself focuses on Nostradamus' life and his prophecies.

"Nostradamus said 'I predict that the world will end at half past six' / What he didn't say was exactly when" are the opening lyrics of "Tinderbox", penned by Bernie Taupin and sung by Elton John.

Modest Mouse vocalist Isaac Brock mentions Nostradamus in a song called "Education" from the band's fifth studio album, We Were Dead Before the Ship Even Sank. The verse is as follows: "Good old Nostradamus / he knew the whole damn time / there would always be an east from west / and someone in there fighting".

In the bonus track of Dane Cook's "Harmful If Swallowed", he speaks of how a person would wake up and think he is late, then look at his clock to find out that he is in fact late: "I HATE it when I'm like Nostradamus and I predict that I'm late!"

Several songs by The Stranglers contain references to Nostradamus' prophecies: "Goodbye Toulouse" (1977), "Shah Shah a go go" (1979), "Four Horsemen" (1980), "Top Secret" (1981), and "It's a Small World" (1983).

=== Comics ===
In an Italian Mickey Mouse story by Massimo Marconi and Massimo De Vita (Topolino e la Piramide Impossible), Mickey and Goofy travel back in time; upon returning to the present, a young boy follows them there. The boy eventually returns to his own time and his memory of the future is erased. However, before that, he grabbed pieces of books; he is revealed to be Nostradamus, with the ripped pages explaining his visions of the future.

In the 1989 Scrooge McDuck story "The Curse of Nostrildamus" by Don Rosa (AR 143), Scrooge enters the prophet's tomb to take the amulet that was the source of his power. However, whoever wears the amulet also attracts disasters – though Donald Duck ends up as the victim of the disasters instead of Scrooge. In author's commentary in the Finnish album release, Don Rosa says that he was inspired to write the story based on the legend that whoever drank from Nostradamus's skull would be given the gift of prophecy.

A Phantom story from 1983 by Ulf Granberg and Jaime Vallvé featured an appearance by Nostradamus.

In the DC Comics Universe, Nostradamus was an ancestor of Zatara and Zatanna.

In the Marvel Comics series S.H.I.E.L.D., Nostradamus is held prisoner of Isaac Newton and kept alive for centuries using the Fountain of Youth so that he can read the future for him.

In Scott Adams's comic strip Dilbert, "Nostradogbert" is a pseudonym of Dogbert.

In the "strip club" section of the Mad magazine, the recurring comic strip Middle School Nostradamus depicts Nostradamus as a preteen in wizard garb who makes predictions of impending despair for the people he is around at inopportune times.

=== Manga ===
Animated design of Nostradamus in Record of Ragnarok

The title of the Japanese historical manga and anime series, Angolmois: Record of Mongol Invasion, uses the term Angolmois from the prophecies of Nostradamus about the reign of the great king of Angolmois. This is interpreted as being an anagram of the Old French word Mongolais 'Mongolians' and thus referring to Genghis Khan.

In Record of Ragnarok, Nostradamus is one of the thirteen historical humans chosen to fight thirteen mythological gods in a tournament for humanity's survival.

In Chainsaw Man, the prophecies of Nostradamus are used to predict the end of the world by the hands of demonic entities.

In Doraemon, the aftermath of believing prophecies strongly and the consequences of it are depicted in reference to Nostradamus.

=== Games ===
Face released an arcade game called Nostradamus. Though the game was unrelated to Nostradamus, its title screen bore a resemblance to his son's portrait of him; however, he is facing the other direction and looks older.

In Castlevania: Aria of Sorrow, the prophecy of 1999 was used as the resurrection of Dracula, adding that all born of the day of Dracula's demise are "Dark Candidates", meaning that they have the potential to become the next Dark Lord. This prophecy is referenced again in Portrait of Ruin; the Belmonts cannot wield the Vampire Killer whip until 1999, when Dracula is revived.

In the eroge Nostradamus ni Kiite Miro♪, a girl named Stra, whose name is a shortened form of Nostradamus, claims to be the writer of Nostradamus' predictions.

The prophet Nostradamus appears in the 2003 video game Lionheart: Legacy of the Crusader.

In Nostradamus: The Last Prophecy, Nostradamus appears as an adviser to his daughter during the game.

In Super Ninja Boy for the Super NES, there is a prophet named Notruedamus.

In Ninja Gaiden, the hero is a nameless ninja on a quest to defeat an evil cult led by a fictional descendant of Nostradamus.

In SpyHunter, the hero, Alec Sects, must stop the organization Nostra. Their leader, Daemon Curry, believes in the prophecies of Nostradamus and that he is the figure mentioned in several religions, and plans to stop the world's electricity.

In Assassin's Creed Unity, there are Nostradamus riddles hidden in Paris for Arno to solve.

In the PopCap game Insaniquarium, Nostradamus is an obtainable pet with the ability to postpone alien attacks.

in the Hudson Soft game Help Wanted, there is a random event where Nostradamus predicts that the object that the player is fighting will get closer to Earth than expected. If the player gets perfect in the job they are tasked to do, the current object will be delayed by a week; if not, then the current object will get seven days closer to Earth.

In the horror video game Fear and Hunger the character of Nosramus, a supportive NPC, is most likely based upon Nostradamus. He is portrayed as a young man with long hair and wearing a white robe. Books written by him can be found ingame.

In the arcade-based fantasy collectible card game, Lord of Vermillion IV, there is a character named Angolmois.

In the arcade shooter Touhou Fossilized Wonders, the extra boss Nina Watari uses a spell card named "Great King of Angolmois".

=== Theatre ===
The soothsayer Thomas Nostradamus is a main character in the musical Something Rotten!, where he was originally portrayed by actor Brad Oscar.
