= July 2025 Japan megaquake prophecy =

False predictions of a major earthquake

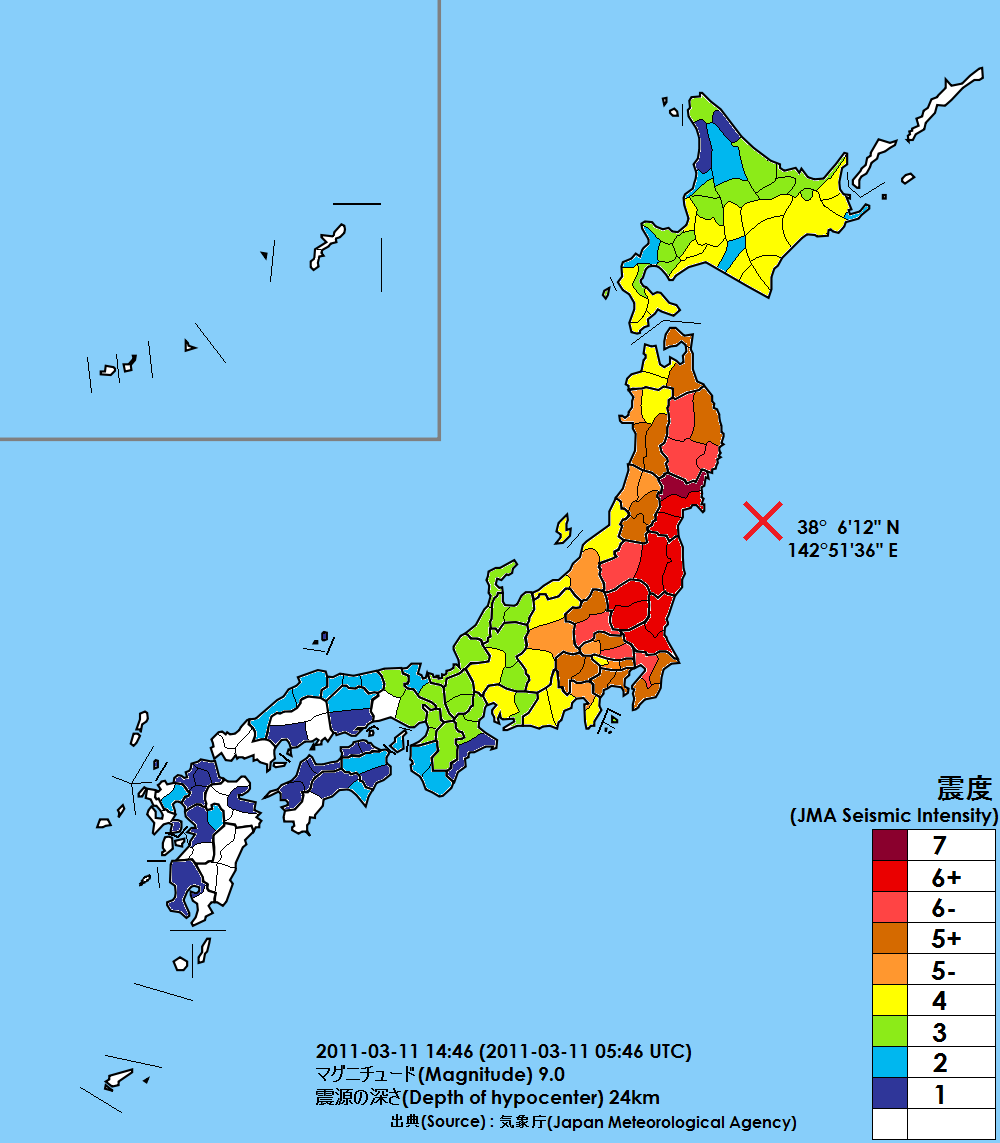
Shake map of the maximum JMA seismic intensities by prefecture for the 11 March 2011 Tōhoku earthquake; the Tokara Islands are in the insert to the upper left

The July 2025 Japan megaquake prophecy was a rumor that began at the end of 2024 that a great earthquake would occur in Japan in July 2025, based on a purported prophecy in the 1999 manga The Future I Saw by Ryo Tatsuki. Its spread in several Asian countries caused a notable decline in holiday travel to Japan. Seismologists rejected the prediction.

== Background ==
External image
- The manga cover of The Future I Saw. One of the Japanese texts reads, "great disaster in March 2011" (Japanese: 大災害は2011年3月). The text only appeared on the book's cover, and the prediction is not mentioned anywhere inside the book itself.

The Future I Saw is a manga written by Ryo Tatsuki and first published by Asahi Sonorama (Note: Defunct since September 2007.) in 1999. It is presented as the author's dream diary. The manga received media attention after the March 2011 Tōhoku earthquake and tsunami, when Tatsuki received messages noting that a diary entry illustrated on the manga's cover had predicted a disaster in March 2011. Tatsuki had already forgotten about the text by that time.

A reprinted version was published by Asuka Shinsha in October 2020, which brought renewed attention to the out-of-print edition, with some second-hand copies selling for 500,000 yen. The attention prompted a Tatsuki impersonator to make false claims in interviews and magazines such as having predicted the Great Hanshin earthquake and the death of Ozaki Yutaka. The impersonator eventually claimed that Mount Fuji would erupt in August, which did not happen.

During this period, the Japanese TV show Unbelievable began producing dramas based on mysterious experiences published by Asuka Shinsha. Tatsuki contacted the publisher, and a new, expanded version was published on October 1, 2021. The reprint became the weekly bestselling book in Japan on May 13, 2025.

The reprints included the text "The real disaster will strike in July 2025" from another of Tatsuki's dreams, with Tatsuki claiming that this event would be a massive fissure opening in the Philippine Sea, causing a tsunami "three times as tall as those from the Tohoku earthquake" that would destroy Japan.

== Impact ==
An opinion poll conducted by SKY Perfect JSAT in June 2025 showed that 49.4% of the Japanese public had heard rumors of the prophecy.

The number of videos discussing the prophecy started to rise around 2023 and began spreading in the Sinophone world, particularly in Hong Kong and Taiwan. This contributed to a decline in holiday bookings to Japan, which led Greater Bay Airlines to reduce the number of flights to Sendai Airport and Tokushima Airport. Hong Kong Airlines went so far as to shut down flights to Sendai completely as of May 31, 2025. Bookings from Hong Kong declined 50% from the previous year and by 83% for travel from late June to early July 2025.

The rumor became a viral phenomenon, spreading to the Philippines, South Korea, Thailand, and Vietnam. Flight ticket prices in Korea dropped below 100,000 won in June 2025. Posts about or warning against travel to Japan were "overflowing" on social media in Thailand and Vietnam. Singaporean tourists, on the other hand, were unfazed by the prophecy; the number of bookings to Japan on both Trip.com and Traveloka did not decrease.

The economic impact was such that it came to the attention of the Anglosphere in late May, with coverage from The Guardian, CNN, and others, and the Francophonie on June 30, with coverage from Le Monde.

== July 2025 ==
From June 25 to July 4, an earthquake swarm occurred near the Tokara Islands in far southwest Japan. The largest of these, on July 4, was at the lower end of 6 on the Japan Meteorological Agency seismic intensity scale (JMA scale). This earthquake swarm was the most intense in the region since 1995. Thirty-one residents requested evacuation to mainland Japan following several earthquakes of 5+ on the JMA scale (approximately VII on the Mercalli scale (Note: A strange roaring from the sea before the earthquakes has been reported, and the quakes had been strong and constant enough to substantially interrupt sleep.)). The earthquakes drew further attention to the rumors of disasters in July.

On July 5, 2025, when the prophecy did not come true, the entry "Nothing happened in Japan" (Chinese: 日本无事发生) became the top trend on Sina Weibo.

A large megathrust earthquake did affect Japan on July 30, at a different location. Tsunami waves from the Mw 8.8 2025 Kamchatka earthquake off the eastern coast of Russia impacted Hokkaido at 10:40 JST. The event sparked some renewed interest in the manga, although Tatsuki herself had previously advised "Don't be overly swayed by my dreams".

== Reactions ==
Fact-check columns on Rappler and the Mainichi Shimbun both stated that scientists cannot predict where and when earthquakes and tsunamis will strike. The Japan Meteorological Agency described accurate prediction of earthquakes as a "hoax". Shengji Wei, Assistant Professor of Asian School of the Environment at Nanyang Technological University, indicated that predicting earthquakes accurately is impossible with current technology.

Ayaka Ebita, director of the Earthquake and Tsunami Observations Division in the Japan Meteorological Agency, responded that earthquakes were "totally coincidental" with the prophecy on July 5 given the geologic conditions of Japan, and urged people to "base their judgment on science".

Huang Hsin-Hua, associate research fellow of the Institute of Earth Sciences in Academia Sinica, noted that earthquakes occur at the boundaries of plates. For earthquakes to occur at the center of a plate, as the book suggested, is not compatible with the current scientific consensus.

== In popular culture ==
A film based on Tatsuki's predictions named July 5, 2025 at 4:18 a.m. was released in Japan in June 2025. Neither the publisher nor Tatsuki herself were involved in the film's production or promotion. The publisher also stated that the while Tatsuki had noted that the dream itself was around "4:18 AM, July 5, 2021", the premonition of disaster in her dream only mentioned "July 2025".

== See also ==
- List of dates predicted for apocalyptic events
- Nostradamus in popular culture
- Baba Vanga
