= Gaby Koss =

German singer (born 1978)

- Born: 25 March 1978 (age 48); Munich, Bavaria, Germany
- Genres: Symphonic metal; neoclassical metal; folk metal; medieval metal
- Occupations: Singer-songwriter; musician
- Instrument: Vocals
- Years active: 1998–present
- Member of: Death Army, Nota Profana, Theatre of the Night
- Formerly of: Haggard, Equilibrium, Beto Vázquez Infinity,
- Website: Gaby Koss' Official Website

Gaby Koss (born 25 March 1978 in Munich, Germany) is a German classically trained soprano who has collaborated with metal and rock acts such as Haggard, Nota Profana and Equilibrium. She is the front singer of the bands Nota Profana and Theatre of the Night. She also has her own ensemble of renaissance, baroque and medieval folk music, Cantus Lunaris. In 2014, she started another band that goes by the name of Diskelion.

She has collaborated with several composers from England, Japan and Russia in the making of movie and TV-series soundtracks. Her collaborators include British composer JD Hermien, composer of the soundtrack for the US series War Wraiths.

== Life and career ==
=== Early days ===
She was born in Munich, Bavaria, Germany. As a child, she enjoyed music, especially singing. When she was 10 she started with weekly piano lessons with a particular teacher and visited the local church choir each week. She took private singing lessons with the vocal teachers like Dietrich Schneider, who has instructed singers including Tölzer Knabenchor.

=== Education and career ===
She studied music and pedagogy at LMU Munich. During her stay at the university, she worked at the Bavarian State Opera and took part in several opera productions, as well in church concerts and some parallel projects with bands. During this time she toured through Europe, Mexico and South America with the metal act Haggard.

=== Haggard ===
She was part of the symphonic metal act Haggard from 1998 to 1 September 2004, when she was fired due to personal disagreements. While she was with the band they toured Europe, Mexico and South America. During the tour of 2001 they recorded the DVD Awaking The Gods from a gig on Mexico. While she was in the band she recorded just one of the albums, Eppur Si Muove, which was published on 2004.

=== Equilibrium and Dragontears ===
Just after she was fired from Haggard, she started to collaborate with the epic folk/viking metal band Equilibrium and also the metal band Dragontears, band of the ex-bassist and colleague from her former band, Haggard. With Equilibrium she was a session and live musician from 2005 to 2010. She recorded three albums with the band: Turis Fratyr (2005), Sagas (2008), Rekreatur (2010).

=== Nota Profana ===
Since 2009, she has been part of the symphonic metal band Nota Profana, working alongside musicians from the Simon Bolivar Youth Orchestra, and now in a more prominent role as part of the beauty-and-the-beast-styled duet alongside male grunts/raw vocals.

With them, she recorded the demo track for the song The Lake, which they presented as their 2009 demo after their first album Violent Whispers. In 2013, she recorded the new full-length production of the band, The Devil's Playground, in which she displayed a more ethereal style in the song The Grove. With Gaby being part of Nota Profana, the band has got much more attention and acceptance worldwide.

=== Cantus Lunaris ===
In the beginning of 2012, she founded the vocal and instrumental ensemble Cantus Lunaris. This is an ensemble of international musicians who she met during her tours and projects. In 2013 they debuted with their first album, Fabula Antiqua. It was released on 15 May of that year. It consisted mostly of the Celtic repertoire of the ensemble.

=== 2013–present ===
Koss is being instructed by the teacher and tenor Saverio Suarez Ribaudo in Munich and collaborates with several bands and with composers for film and TV-Series soundtracks. She is also a singer for the band Doninia, where she sings in different styles ranging from very ethnic and dark vocalizations to the classical technique she usually uses.

She started the symphonic rock/metal project Diskelion alongside the guitarist Tom Harris. In an upcoming album, they will feature many guest singers, among them the singer from the symphonic metal band Diabulus In Musica, Zuberoa Aznárez.

== Singing style ==
=== Vocal profile ===
Gaby has a four-octave vocal range and is a lyric coloratura soprano. She has developed in several singing styles and techniques to create what she calls "different voices", and right now she is working with her current teacher with tenorina (female tenor) repertoire.

== Other active projects ==
- Theatre of Night
- Diskelion
- Death Army

== Discography ==
=== With Nota Profana ===
Demos:

- Demo 2009 (2009)

Studio albums:

- The Devil's Playground (2013)

=== With Cantus Lunaris ===
Studio albums:

- Fabula Antiqua (2013)

=== With Diskelion ===
Studio albums:

- Remember Sorrow (2014)

=== With Haggard ===
Studio albums:

- Eppur Si Muove

Live albums:

- Awaking the Gods: Live in Mexico (2001)

=== As guest/session vocalist ===
- SpiRitual: Pulse (EP) (2005) – Female vocals
- Equilibrium: Turis Fratyr (2005) – Female vocals
- Helfahrt: Sturmgewalt (2006)
- Darkdream: Behind Dead Eyes (2007)
- Equilibrium: Sagas (2007)
- Varg: Wolfszeit (2007) – Female vocals on "Weltenbrand"
- Ars Irae: Verwelkt (2007) – Vocals on "Elysium"
- Howling Syn: A Taste of Modern Evil (2008) – Female vocals
- Ars Irae: Unter der Erde (2010) – Female vocals
- Beto Vázquez Infinity: Existence (2010) – vocals on "Ghost of the Past"
- Braveride: Rise of the Dragonrider (2010)
- Equilibrium: Rekreatur (2010)
- Factory of Dreams: Utopia (2010)
- Coronatus: Terra Incognita (2011) – Soprano choir vocals, Secrets of Nature (2017) – Soprano voice
- Theatre of Night: What Child is This (2012)
- Theatre of Night: Carol of Bells (2012)
- Evenoire: Vitriol (2012) – vocals on "Misleading Paradise"
- Nostra Morte: Sin Retorno (2012)
- Dominia: Death Only (Single) (2013) – vocals on "Death Only"
- Dominia: Theophania (2014) – Female vocals
- Jano Baghoumian: Bellow at Dreams (2017) Single – Female vocals
- Jano Baghoumian: Firmamentum (2017) Album - Soprano voice
