= Nostradamus (disambiguation) =

Nostradamus was a 16th-century French apothecary and reputed seer famous for his prophecies.

Nostradamus or Nostradamos may also refer to:

== Music ==
- Nostradamos (band), Greek pop group
- Nostradamus (album), a 2008 album by Judas Priest
- Nikolo Kotzev's Nostradamus, a 2001 rock opera
- "Nostradamus", a 1973 song by Al Stewart from the album Past, Present and Future, later covered by Manfred Mann's Earth Band as "Eyes of Nostradamus" on the album Somewhere In Afrika

== Other uses ==
- Nostradamus (1925 film), an Italian silent film
- Nostradamus (1994 film), a film about Nostradamus' life
- Nostradamus (2000 film) starring Rob Estes
- Nostradamus (video game), a 1993 arcade game
- Gegenes nostradamus, a species of butterfly
- NOSTRADAMUS, a French over-the-horizon radar system

== See also ==
- Nastradamus, a 1999 album by Nas
  - "Nastradamus" (song), a song on the album
