= Licia Missori =

Italian pianist and composer

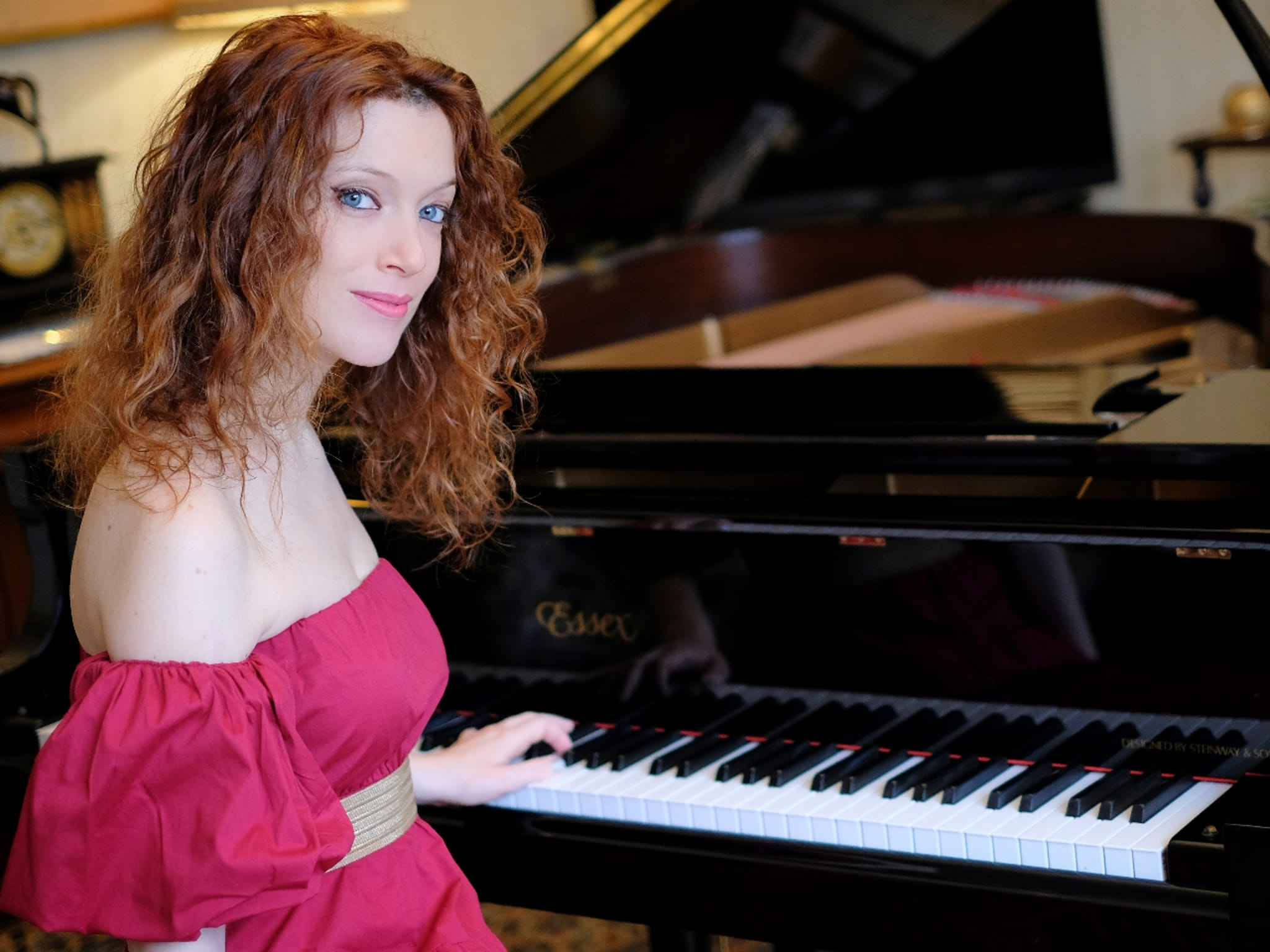
- Licia Missori in 2022
- Born: Licia Missori; Rome, Italy
- Education: University of Rome Tor Vergata; Roma Tre University; Conservatorio Santa Cecilia
- Occupations: Pianist; keyboardist; composer; songwriter; music producer
- Years active: 2002–present
- Works: Discography
- Musical career
- Genres: Classical music; contemporary classical music; rock; alternative rock; dark wave; symphonic metal; Celtic fusion; video game music; progressive music; chamber pop
- Instruments: Piano; keyboard; vocals
- Website: www.liciamissori.it

Licia Missori (born in Rome, Italy) is an Italian pianist, keyboardist, composer, songwriter and music producer. Her work spans a diverse array of genres, ranging from classical music to rock and dark wave, as well as symphonic metal, Celtic fusion and video game music.

Trained a classical pianist from the age of five, Missori has worked and toured worldwide with several acts in the rock scene, including Haggard, Belladonna, Spiral69, and Steve Hewitt from Placebo. Also, she has toured alongside film actor Giancarlo Giannini in Italian theaters.

Missori has collaborated with advergame company Gamindo since 2019, composing and producing video game music for several brands, including Google, Discovery Plus, Barilla, Lavazza and Chiara Ferragni. In 2024, Missori released the book Musica per videogiochi, which was the first book to be published in Italy that was systematically dedicated to game music

In 2010, Missori founded the alternative rock band The Dark Side of Venus, for which she is a songwriter, composer, pianist, and keyboardist. The band won the Italian Opening Band Live Music Festival 2011, opening Paolo Benvegnù's concert in Trieste in the same year. In 2012, The Dark Side of Venus released the single Dirty Paradise, which was produced by Novembre's guitarist Massimiliano Pagliuso. In 2016, the band released the album Power to Victims, its cover featuring a black and white photograph of Missori's hands and forearms wrapped in chains, shot by Italian fashion photographer Alfredo Sabbatini. In the following year, The Dark Side of Venus toured with Claudio Simonetti's Goblin, Sirenia, and The Birthday Massacre. Missori is currently also a member of the Celtic fusion band Green Clouds as pianist, in the character of Erin.

Missori has released eight solo albums periodically since 2002. She performs as a soloist and with orchestras, including the Roman Xilon Orchestra and Tin Pan Orchestra, for which Missori also works as an arranger.

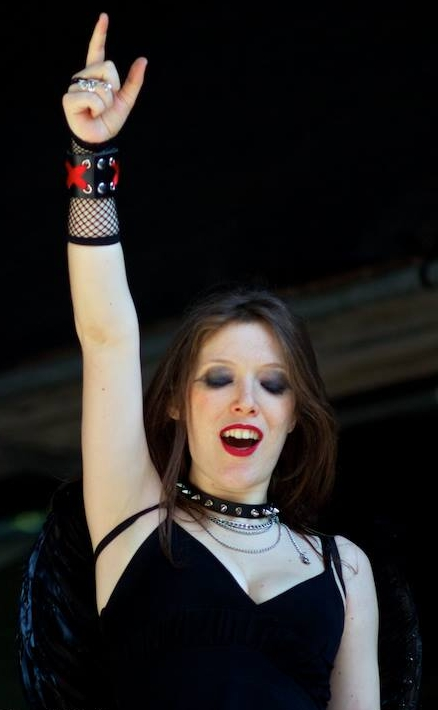
Licia Missori performing at Wave Gotik Treffen in 2012.

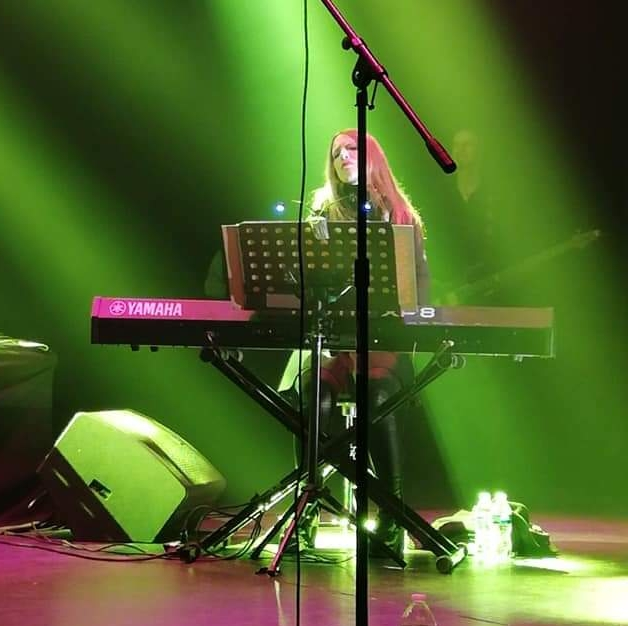
Licia Missori performing at the 2022 Wacken Open Air Festival.

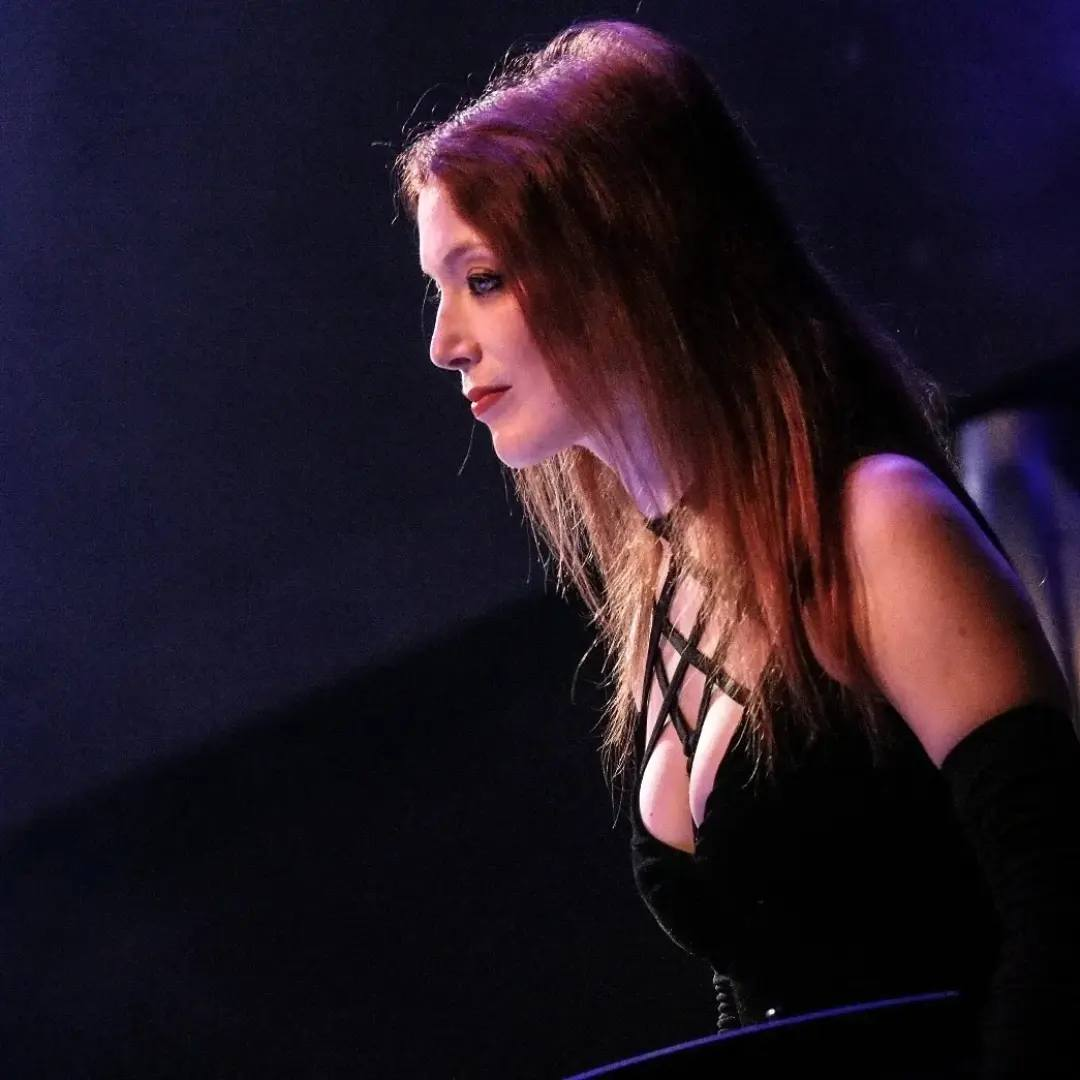
Licia Missori performing in Colombia with Haggard in 2023.

== Discography ==
=== Solo albums ===
- Flowered Emotions (2002)
- Nuits Blanches (2003)
- Amore e Morte (2009)
- Neverland (2015)
- Nostalgia del Futuro (2021)
- Dreaming Together (2022)
- Video Game Soundtracks Vol. 1 (2023)
- Alternative Dimensions (2023)

=== Album collaborations ===
- Spiral69 - No paint on the wall (2011)
- Pure - Love after the end of the world (2012)
- The Dark Side of Venus - Dirty Paradise (2012)
- The Divinos - The Divino Code (2012)
- Spiral69 - Ghosts in my eyes (2013)
- Belladonna - Sweet child o' mine (2013) *
- Belladonna - Shooting dice with God (2013)
- Ida Elena - Awakening (2013) *
- Neverflowers - Neverflowers (2013)
- Chiazzetta - I mostri (2014)
- R - The pain you feel (2015)
- The Dark Side of Venus - Power to Victims (2016)
- David Zulli - La danza della nudità (2017)
- Elisa Erin Bonomo - Antifragile (2017)
- The Konspirators - Memorie dall'Underground (2020)
- David Zulli - 2Q20 (2020)
- Elisa Erin Bonomo - Sinusoide (2021)
- Ranthiel - Stargazers (2021) *
- DBD Trio - Bridge the Gap (2022)
- Green Clouds - Game of Thrones (2023) *
- Green Clouds - Rosemarie's Fantasy (2023)

* Single.

== Books ==
- Missori, L. (2012). Dolce notte tossica. La storia di quando sono morta. Centro Studi Tindari Patti. ISBN 978-88-96497-87-6
- Missori, L. (2024). Musica per videogiochi. Edizioni Dedalo. ISBN 978-88-220-6919-1
