= Coronatus =

German gothic metal band

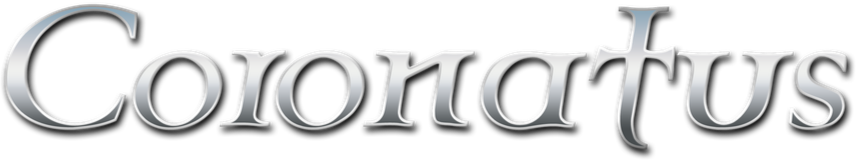

Background information
- Origin: Ludwigsburg, Germany
- Genres: Gothic metal
- Years active: 1999–present
- Label: Massacre Records
- Website: coronatus.de

Coronatus is a German gothic metal band, formed in Ludwigsburg in 1999.

Fronted by two female singers with contrasting voices and styles, the band has released ten studio albums since 2007. Recreatio Carminis and Secrets of Nature are the only albums so far to feature three female singers.

== Band history ==
Founded in 1999 by vocalist Georgios Grigoriadis and drummer Mats Kurth, Coronatus released its debut single Von Engeln nur in 2002. In 2004, Grigoriadis left, and was replaced by not one but two singers, Carmen R. Schäfer and Viola Schuch. The permanent line-up was expanded in 2006 with the addition of guitarist Stefan Häfele, bassist Wolle Nillies and keyboardist Fabian Merkt.

2007 saw the departure of Viola Schuch, who was replaced by Ada Flechtner.

Chriz diAnno (bass) has played with the band in 2003, 2005–2006, and then again since 2007. Ada Flechtner left the band to devote full attention to her studies, but joined the German symphonic metal band Voices of Destiny in 2013, after their lead vocalist Maike Holzmann departed. Mid 2010, Natalia Kempin joined the band on the vocals and Dirk Baur joined the band on bass guitar. On February 2, 2011, Natalia Kempin announced on her Facebook, that she left the band, due to different opinions about the band's music.

== Musical style ==
The band follows in a style influenced by established groups Nightwish and Epica. Their lyrics are in German, English and Latin, and their songs deal with life, interpersonal relationships, religion and death. Their musical style is melodic, rhythmic gothic metal with "a liking to the Middle Ages genre: piano, flute, bagpipes and violin manifest the balancing act between medieval atmosphere and heavy metal sound". Songs are performed by two female singers whose styles are very different.

== Concerts and recordings ==
The band's first contract was in June 2007 with record label Massacre Records and their first album was released on 21 September 2007. Their second album was launched on 28 November 2008. The band has also taken part in several concerts with groups such as Haggard and Within Temptation.

== Members ==
Current Members

- Leni Eitrich - vocals (2021–present)
- Mats Kurth – drums (1999–present)
- Kristina Jülich – violin (2019–present)
- Brigitte "Nemesis" Kaefer - vocals (2022-present)
- Harald "Harry" Zeidlers - guitars (2022-present)

Former Members

- Carmen R. Lorch – vocals (2004–2010, 2013–2019)
- Mareike Makosch – vocals (2011–2014, 2017–2021)
- Gaby Koss – vocals (2017–2018)
- Pinu'u Remus – keyboard (2013–2014, 2015)
- Georgios Grigoriadis – vocals (1999–2003)
- Martin Goes – bass guitar (2002–2003)
- Oliver Szczypula – guitars (2002–2003)
- Tanja Ivenz – vocals (2002–2003)
- Chriz DiAnno – bass guitar (2003, 2007–2009)
- Clarissa Darling – guitars (2004–2005)
- Verena Schock – vocals (2004–2006)
- Wolle Nillies – guitars (2005–2007)
- Jo Lang – guitars (2007–2011)
- Fabian Merkt – keyboards (2005–2010)
- Ada Flechtner – vocals (2007–2009, 2011–2014)
- Viola Schuch – vocals (2006–2007)
- Michael Teutsch – bass guitar (2006)
- Stefan Häfele – bass guitar (2006–2007)
- Jakob Thiersch – guitars (2006)
- Todd Goldfinger – bass guitar (2009–2010)
- Lisa Lasch – vocals (2009–2010)
- Natalia Kempin – vocals (2010–2011)
- Simon Hassemer – keyboards (2011–2012)
- Aria Keramati Nori – guitars (2009–2014)
- Dirk Baur – bass guitar (2011–2014)
- Anny Maleyes – vocals (2014–2017)
- Olivér D. – guitars (2014–2017)
- Susanne Bachmann – vocals (2015–2017), bass guitar (2017)
- Dennis Schwachhofer – keyboards (2015)
- Katharina G. Mann - vocals (2019–2021)
- Jörn Langenfeld – guitars (2019)
- Moni Francis - vocals (2021–2022)
- Mark Knaus - bass guitar (2021)
- Axel Grill - guitars (2021)

Timeline

== Discography ==
Studio albums

- 2007: Lux Noctis
- 2008: Porta Obscura
- 2009: Fabula Magna
- 2011: Terra Incognita
- 2013: Recreatio Carminis
- 2014: Cantus Lucidus
- 2015: Raben im Herz
- 2017: Secrets of Nature
- 2019: The Eminence of Nature
- 2021: Atmosphere
- 2026: Dreadful Waters

Demos

- 2002: Von Engeln nur
- 2005: Promo CD

Compilation albums

- 2011: Best of
- 2012: Best of 2007–2011
