= Fabula Magna =

Studio album by Coronatus
- Released: 18 December 2009
- Studios: Klangschmiede Studio E, Mellrichstadt
- Genre: Gothic metal
- Length: 50:28
- Label: Massacre

Coronatus chronology
| Porta Obscura (2008) | Fabula Magna (2009) | Terra Incognita (2011) |

Fabula Magna is the third full-length studio album by German gothic metal band Coronatus. Thematically it focuses on myths, tales and legends.

== Reception ==
Professional ratings
Review scores
| Source | Rating |
|---|---|
| Metal.de | 6/10 |
| Metal Hammer (Germany) | 4/7 |

The album received mixed reviews from the German musical press. Metal Hammer awarded four out of seven points in a review and cited stereotypics of the genre. The Sonic Seducer's reviewer was positive though about the mix of classic gothic metal and elements of medieval metal, a new style in Coronatus' repertoire. The overall album was criticised though for being too overloaded.

== Track listing ==
| No. | Title | Length |
|---|---|---|
| 1. | "Preface" | 1:32 |
| 2. | "Geisterkirche" | 4:35 |
| 3. | "Tantalos" | 3:32 |
| 4. | "Wolfstanz" | 5:16 |
| 5. | "Der Fluch" | 5:24 |
| 6. | "Flying By (Alone)" | 5:03 |
| 7. | "Kristallklares Wasser" | 4:22 |
| 8. | "How Far" | 3:56 |
| 9. | "Der Letzte Tanz" | 4:28 |
| 10. | "Est Carmen..." | 3:56 |
| 11. | "Blind" | 4:07 |
| 12. | "Josy" | 4:17 |
| 13. | "Scream Of The Butterfly" (Special Acoustic Version) | 5:10 |
| 14. | "Hot And Cold" (Rework 2009) | 3:53 |
| Total length: | | 59:31 |

== Personnel ==
- Carmen R. Schäfer – vocals
- Lisa Lasch – vocals
- Jo Lang – guitars
- Aria Keramati Noori – guitars
- Fabian Merkt – keyboards & programming
- Todd D. Goldfinger – bass (toddstar.com)
- Mats Kurth – drums
