= Porta Obscura =

Studio album by Coronatus
- Released: 14 November 2008
- Recorded: 2008
- Studio: Klangschmiede Studio E in Mellrichstadt, Germany
- Genre: Gothic metal
- Length: 45:23
- Label: Massacre
- Producer: Coronatus

Coronatus chronology
Lux Noctis (2007)	Porta Obscura (2008)	Fabula Magna (2009)

Porta Obscura is the second studio album by German gothic metal band Coronatus. It contains 11 tracks plus 2 bonus tracks included in the limited edition digipak which was released along with the standard edition. Those bonus tracks are "Flos Obscura", a new recorded Latin version of the track "Dunkle Blume" from their last album, Lux Noctis, and "Volles Leben", the band's first song in its initial form with male vocals.

== Reception ==
Professional ratings
Review scores
Source	Rating
Lords of Metal	67/100
Metal.de	5/10
Metal Hammer (Germany)	6/7
Metal Perspective	1.5/5 stars
Stormbringer	3.5/5 stars

Porta Obscura received mixed reviews from the critics. A review by the Dutch Lords of Metal website complained about a lack of "remarkable compositions". The German edition of Metal Hammer compared the style to Nightwish with influences of medieval metal and lauded the accomplished production. Metal Perspective's reviewer called the album "below average, providing only weak, typical and uninspiring moments" while the German Sonic Seducer magazine marked a considerable improvement of the vocal arrangements compared to Coronatus' first album and praised the multiple musical hues on Porta Obscura. The Austrian webzine Stormbringer was positive about the compositions but asked for a more distinctive original input from the band.

== Track listing ==
No.	Title	Length
1.	"Prologue"	1:57
2.	"Exitus"	4:00
3.	"Fallen"	6:50
4.	"In Silence"	4:22
5.	"Beauty in Black"	4:36
6.	"Cast My Spell"	5:09
7.	"In Your Hands"	2:41
8.	"Mein Herz"	3:16
9.	"Am Kreuz"	4:39
10.	"Der Vierte Reiter"	4:30
11.	"Strahlendster Erster"	3:23
12.	"Flos Obscura" (bonus track)	5:14
13.	"Volles Leben" (bonus track)	3:56
Total length:		54:33

== Personnel ==
- Carmen R. Schäfer – vocals
- Ada Flechtner – vocals
- Jo Lang – guitars
- Aria Keramati Noori – guitars
- Fabian Merkt – keyboards & programming
- Chriz diAnno – bass
- Mats Kurth – drums

== Info ==
- Mastered by Mika Jussila at Finnvox Studios in Helsinki, Finland.
- The songwriting started when the soprano singer Carmen R. Schäfer was expecting a child. Before finishing it she gave birth to her daughter, Beatrice Anita.
