= Lux Noctis =

Studio album by Coronatus
- Released: 21 September 2007
- Recorded: 2006
- Studio: Klangschmiede Studio E, Mellrichstadt, Germany
- Genre: Gothic metal
- Length: 39:30
- Label: Massacre
- Producer: Coronatus

Coronatus chronology
Von Engeln nur (2003)	Lux Noctis (2007)	Porta Obscura (2008)

Lux Noctis is the first full-length studio album by German gothic metal band Coronatus, released in 2007.

== Reception ==
Professional ratings
Review scores
Source	Rating
Lords of Metal	78/100
Metal.de	3/10
Metal Hammer (Germany)	3/7
Metalrage	83%
Stormbringer	4.5/5 stars

A review by Sonic Seducer called the album "halfbaked" due to unbalanced vocal sets, but lauded the overall quality of the production. The Austrian Stormbringer webzine was equally positive about the production but found the contrasting female voices to be a unique and positive asset of the band. The German edition of Metal Hammer compared the style to Nightwish and awarded three out of seven points in its rating.

Petőfi Csarnok of Kultura.hu said "Lux Noctis album has one of last year's best female vocals".

== Track listing ==
No.	Title	Length
1.	"Interrotte Speranze"	1:28
2.	"The Scream of the Butterfly"	4:17
3.	"Silberlicht"	4:01
4.	"Dunkle Blume"	4:37
5.	"My Rose Desire"	4:01
6.	"Winter"	1:36
7.	"Hot & Cold"	5:40
8.	"Requiem Tabernam"	4:36
9.	"Ich atme Zeit"	4:30
10.	"In Remembrance"	0:52
11.	"Volles Leben"	3:52
Total length:		39:30

== Personnel ==
- Carmen R. Schäfer – vocals
- Viola Schuch – vocals
- Wolfgang Nillies – guitars
- Fabian Merkt – keyboards & programming
- Stefan Häfele – bass
- Mats Kurth – drums

== Info ==
- Mastered by Mika Jussila at Finnvox Studios in Helsinki, Finland.
