= Terra Incognita (Coronatus album) =

Studio album by Coronatus
- Released: 18 November 2011
- Studio: Klangschmiede Studio E, Mellrichstadt
- Genre: Gothic metal
- Length: 54:30
- Label: Massacre
- Producer: Coronatus; Markus Stock

Coronatus chronology
Fabula Magna (2009)	Terra Incognita (2011)	Recreatio Carminis (2013)

Professional ratings
Review scores
Source	Rating
Metal.de	5/10

Terra Incognita is the fourth full-length studio album by German gothic metal band Coronatus, released on 18 November 2011 by Massacre Records.

== Track listing ==
No.	Title	Length
1.	"Saint Slayer"	4:12
2.	"Fernes Land"	3:39
3.	"A Dead Man's Tale"	4:45
4.	"Sie Stehn am Weg"	3:21
5.	"Vor der Schlacht"	4:51
6.	"Hateful Affection"	3:31
7.	"In Signo Crucis Trilogy Part I - Der Kleriker"	5:13
8.	"In Signo Crucis Trilogy Part II - Das zweite Gesicht"	4:24
9.	"In Signo Crucis Trilogy Part III - In Signo Crucis"	6:17
10.	"Der Letzte Freund"	5:24
11.	"Traumzeit"	4:18
12.	"Terra Incognita"	4:32
Total length:		54:30

== Personnel ==
- Carmen R. Schäfer – vocals
- Gaby Koss – soprano vocals
- Ada Flechtner – vocals
- Mareike Makosch – vocals
- Petra Straussova – vocals
- Ally "The Fiddle" Storch – fiddle
- Dirk Baur – conductor, bass guitar, backing vocals
- Aria Keramati Noori – guitar
- Simon Maria Hassemer – keyboard
- Teddy Moehrke – tenor vocals
- Albrecht Lutz – tenor vocals, bass vocals
- Mats Kurth – drums
