= 2025 Tokara Islands earthquakes =

Series of earthquakes in southwest Japan

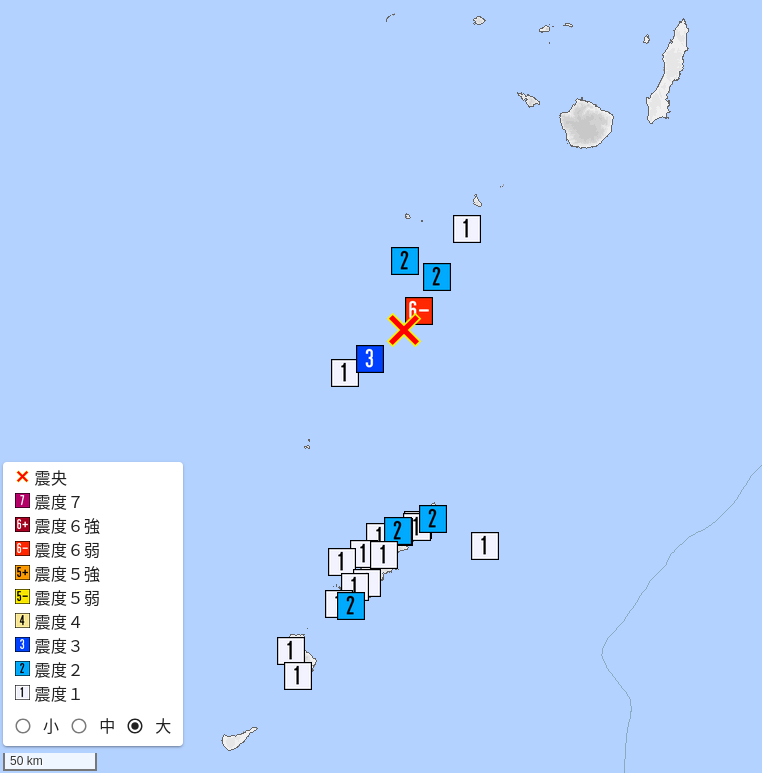
- Map of JMA seismic intensities for the 3 July event

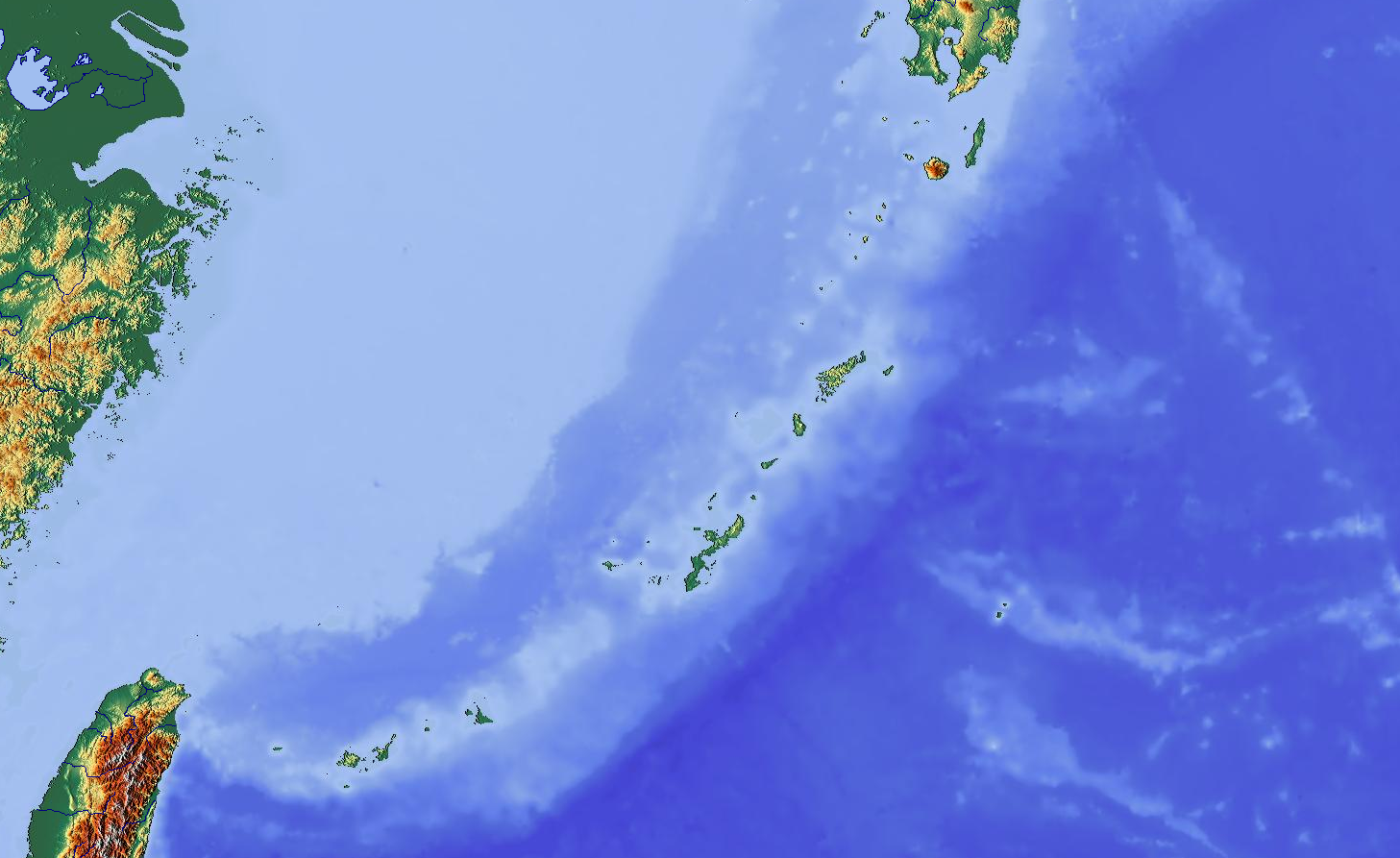
- Location within Ryukyu Islands
- UTC time: 2025-07-02 06:26:49
- USGS-ANSS: ComCat
- Local date: 21 June 2025 – ongoing
- Local time: 15:26 JST (UTC+9)
- Magnitude: M_{w} 5.6 (strongest tremor)
- Depth: 10 km (6 mi) (USGS); 1 km (1 mi) (JMA)
- Epicenter: Tatsugō, Kagoshima; 29.227°N 129.316°E (strongest tremor)
- Type: Strike-slip (strongest tremor)
- Areas affected: Tokara Islands
- Max. intensity: JMA 6− (MMI VII)
- Casualties: None

On 21 June 2025, an intensive earthquake swarm started near the lightly populated Tokara Islands, located in the East China Sea and administered by Kagoshima Prefecture, Japan. The most intense shaking registered a 6- on the JMA Shindo scale on 3 July, and the most powerful earthquake was a M_{w} 5.6 on 2 July. This earthquake swarm is the most intense such since 1995. 31 residents requested evacuation to the mainland following several earthquakes of Shindo 5+, or approximately VII on the Mercalli scale. Only cracks in roads and a schoolyard, as well as landslides and rockfalls, were reported in the islands, with no documented injuries. A strange roaring from the sea before the earthquakes has also been noted, and the quakes have been strong and constant enough to substantially interrupt sleep.

== List of earthquakes ==
List of earthquakes with a seismic intensity of Shindo 5− and higher
Time (JST)	Epicenter	Magnitude (USGS)	Intensity (Shindo)	Depth	Notes
30 June 18:33	29.321°N 129.392°E	M_{w} 5.2	JMA 5−	10 km (6 mi) (USGS); 30 km (19 mi) (JMA)	
2 July 4:32	29.331°N 129.406°E	M_{w} 5.1	JMA 5−	10 km (6 mi) (USGS); 30 km (19 mi) (JMA)	
2 July 15:26	29.244°N 129.244°E	M_{w} 5.6	JMA 5−	10 km (6 mi) (USGS); 10 km (6 mi) (JMA)	
3 July 16:13	29.416°N 129.395°E	M_{w} 5.5	JMA 6−	10 km (6 mi) (USGS); 20 km (12 mi) (JMA)	
5 July 6:29	29.348°N 129.269°E	M_{w} 5.4	JMA 5+	10 km (6 mi) (USGS); 20 km (12 mi) (JMA)	
6 July 14:01	29.353°N 129.481°E	M_{w} 4.9	JMA 5+	10 km (6 mi) (USGS); 20 km (12 mi) (JMA)	
6 July 14:07	29.376°N 129.552°E	M_{w} 5.5	JMA 5+	10 km (6 mi) (USGS); 20 km (12 mi) (JMA)	
7 July 00:12	29.286°N 129.692°E	mb 4.9	JMA 5−	10 km (6 mi) (USGS); 20 km (12 mi) (JMA)	

== Response ==
The earthquake swarm has prompted evacuations from the islands of Akusekijima and Kodakarajima.

== Manga connection ==
The earthquake swarm was connected by the Japanese public to the manga The Future I Saw, which told of a large tsunami (Note: The manga did not state anything about an earthquake; one speculation was that a meteorite would cause the tsunami, but it was eventually dismissed after JAXA confirmed the absence of an impending threat.) on 5 July in the Philippine Sea. The Japan Meteorological Agency denied the predictive validity of pseudo-science: "1-Minute Explainer: Can you trust social media claims about the 'Tokara Rule' or predictions of a major disaster on the 5th? (Mainichi Shimbun)".
