= The Future I Saw =

Japanese manga published by Ryo Tatsuki

- Reprinted version of The Future I Saw, published in 2021. The text on the red strip of paper, 本当の大災難は2025年7月に, means "A real disaster will (be) in July 2025"

私が見た未来 (Watashi ga mita mirai)
- Genre: Japanese literature, manga
- Manga
- Written by: Ryo Tatsuki
- Published by: Asahi Sonorama
- Volumes: 3

The Future I Saw (Japanese: 私が見た未来, Hepburn: Watashiga Mita Mirai) is a manga by Ryo Tatsuki first published on July 1, 1999.

The book is a set of manga of Tatsuki's dreams, according to her diary. The second part of the book included Tatsuki's mystery manga prior to her retirement following the publication of the book. Starting in 2024 a pervasive rumor (based on the manga) spread that a great earthquake would happen in Japan on July 5, 2025 which had a considerable economic impact on holiday travel to Japan that season.

A reprinted full version was published on October 1, 2021, and the version with extra diaries by the author was released on April 1, 2022. The reprint includes additional messages and context about the book's background.

== Background ==
Tatsuki Ryo started recording her dreams in 1985 when her mother gave her a notebook. A severe case of writer's block in the 1990s led her to quit literature. For her final production, she compiled her previous works and manga into a single volume. Tatsuki claimed that when she was struggling to come up with the last text to write on one of the notebook pages on the cover, just before the deadline, she dreamt of the text "The disaster will arrive in March 2011" on a white screen. This was the text—literally "Great disaster, year 2011 month 3, that is, March"—included on the cover of the book she published on July 1, 1999; she retired shortly thereafter. The book explained Tatsuki's dreams and its real-life connections as well, including a dream about a large tsunami.

== Dreams vis-à-vis events ==
In the original and the complete edition, Tatsuki shares her dreams, some of which match real-life events that occurred years afterwards. These are some of the stories included in the original print, as well as the complete edition reprint.

- On November 24, 1976, Tatsuki dreamt about the sudden death of Freddie Mercury, she dreamt about him again on November 29, 1986, in which she saw the other band members of Queen and a statue of an unknown man. Freddie Mercury died on November 24, 1991, exactly 15 years after Tatsuki dreamed about his death.
- In 1992, Tatsuki dreamt of a portrait of a woman; she also heard a voice belonging to a woman named "DIANNA". On August 31, 1997, Diana, Princess of Wales died in a traffic accident. However, Ryo Tatsuki states that in her dream, she did not sense that the woman would die, and that readers had later imposed that interpretation.

== Media ==
No.	Title	Release date	ISBN
01	私が見た未来; The Future I Saw	July 1, 1999	978-4-257-98699-7
02	私が見た未来 完全版; The Future I Saw: Complete Edition	October 1, 2021	978-4-8641-0851-5
03	私が見た未来完全版 + 夢日記帳付き; The Future I Saw: Complete Edition + Dream Journal	April 1, 2022	978-4-8641-0884-3

== Media coverage and impact ==
The manga first gained attention after the 2011 Tōhoku earthquake and tsunami, when it was found that the cover of the book had apparently predicted a disaster occurring in March 2011. In 2020, the manga attracted even more attention despite the demise of original publisher Asahi Sonorama and the fact that the book itself was out of print. The 2021 reprint warned of a "real disaster" in July 2025, causing a minor case of mass hysteria in 2025 when summer trips to Japan from East Asia decreased markedly and several airlines cancelled flights. In turn the Tokara Islands July 2025 earthquake swarm prompted Ryo Tatsuki to issue a statement, released by her new publisher, that she was "not a prophet".
