= Awaking the Gods: Live in Mexico =

Live album by Haggard
- Released: 2001
- Genre: Symphonic metal; doom metal
- Length: 60:11
- Label: Drakkar Entertainment
- Producer: T. Süß; B. N. Würz; L. Damm

Haggard chronology
Awaking the Centuries (2000)	Awaking the Gods: Live in Mexico (2001)	Eppur Si Muove (2004)

Awaking the Gods: Live in Mexico is the first live album by the German symphonic metal band Haggard. It was released on 24 September 2001 by Drakkar Entertainment. It was filmed at Teatro Ferrocarrilero in Mexico City during the tour for the Awaking the Centuries album. The DVD contains footage from Teotihuacan between the songs.

Due to technical issues the DVD audio is from the studio albums Awaking the Centuries and And Thou Shalt Trust... the Seer.

== Reception ==
The album received a positive review by the German Sonic Seducer magazine, calling it a unique fusion of Medieval, Baroque and Classical music with traditional metal. The musical skills of the band members were also stressed out in this review. Rock Hard noted the balanced recording and wrote that the album had authentically caught the concert's atmosphere.

== Track listing ==
No.	Title	Length
1.	"Intro / Rachmaninov Choir"	2:14
2.	"Mediaeval Part"	1:49
3.	"Lost"	4:38
4.	"Prophecy Fulfilled / And the Dark Night Entered"	7:02
5.	"Menuett"	1:21
6.	"Origin of a Crystal Soul"	7:14
7.	"Awaking the Centuries"	10:10
8.	"Courante"	1:29
9.	"In a Fullmoon Procession"	6:09
10.	"Final Victory"	7:03
11.	"In a Pale Moon's Shadow"	11:02

The DVD Plus version contains three DVD tracks:

1. "Final Victory"
2. "In a Pale Moon's Shadow"
3. "Awaking the Centuries"
