= Tales of Ithiria =

Studio album by Haggard
- Released: 29 August 2008
- Genre: Symphonic metal
- Length: 43:03
- Label: Drakkar Entertainment

Haggard chronology
Eppur Si Muove (2004)	Tales of Ithiria (2008)

Tales of Ithiria is the fourth studio album by the German symphonic metal band Haggard. Previously known under its work title A Dark Winter's Tale, this album breaks the band's habit of writing about historical characters and events. Instead, it tells a fictional, medieval-themed story written by Haggard's songwriter Asis Nasseri. The album includes a cover version of the song "Hijo de la Luna" (Child of the Moon), originally written by José María Cano and performed by his own band, Spanish Pop group Mecano. However, his authorship of the song is not acknowledged in the CD's booklet, instead being referred to as "Traditional" music and lyrics.

The album was released on 29 August 2008. It peaked at positions 37 in the German Album Charts and 89 in the Swiss Music Charts.

== Track listing ==
All tracks are written by Asis Nasseri except "Hijo de la Luna" by José María Cano.

No.	Title	Length
1.	"The Origin"	1:57
2.	"Chapter I – Tales of Ithiria"	8:08
3.	"From Deep Within"	0:25
4.	"Chapter II – Upon Fallen Autumn Leaves"	6:37
5.	"In des Königs Hallen (Allegretto Siciliano)" (Music by Hans Wolf)	2:03
6.	"Chapter III – La Terra Santa"	4:55
7.	"Vor dem Sturme"	0:35
8.	"Chapter IV – The Sleeping Child"	6:10
9.	"Hijo de la Luna" (Written by José María Cano)	4:20
10.	"On These Endless Fields"	1:03
11.	"Chapter V – The Hidden Sign"	6:25
Total length:		42:38

== Reception ==
Professional ratings
Review scores
Source	Rating
Lords of Metal	(94/100)
MetalGlory	(7.5/10)
Metal Hammer	(6/7)
Sonic Seducer	Favourable

Tales of Ithiria received favourable reviews from the critics. The German issue of Metal Hammer noted a perfect arrangement of instruments and vocalists but criticised the short net playtime of music on the album, which consists of frequent narrations between the tracks. The Dutch Lords of Metal webzine lauded the connection of classical music and extreme Metal and the transfer of the storyline into music. The German MetalGlory ezine highlighted the multiple voice parts of male grunts and classical male and female voices but criticised the short total time as well. The German Sonic Seducer magazine was critical though of the grunts which according to their review contrast the otherwise subtle mood of the songs. Sonic Seducer however lauded the work of drummer Mike Terrana as narrator and also the arrangement of the cover version of "Hijo de la Luna".
