= Awaking the Centuries =

Studio album by Haggard
- Released: 7 February 2000
- Recorded: September–December 1999
- Studio: Roth Recording
- Genre: Symphonic death metal, death-doom
- Length: 37:39
- Label: Drakkar Entertainment

Haggard chronology
And Thou Shalt Trust... the Seer (1997)	Awaking the Centuries (2000)	Awaking the Gods: Live in Mexico (2001)

Awaking the Centuries is the second full-length album by German symphonic metal band Haggard. It was released on 7 February 2000 by Drakkar Entertainment. The album is based on Michel De Nostredame (Nostradamus) and his experience during The Black Plague in medieval Europe. The album features several compositions based on Sergei Rachmaninoff's music.

Awakening the Centuries peaked at position 64 in the German album charts.

== Track listing ==
No.	Title	Length
1.	"Rachmaninov: Choir" (music by Sergei Rachmaninoff)	0:38
2.	"Pestilencia"	1:54
3.	"Heavenly Damnation"	2:59
4.	"The Final Victory"	3:35
5.	"Saltorella la Manuelina"	0:57
6.	"Awaking the Centuries"	9:34
7.	"Statement zur Lage der Musica"	1:19
8.	"In a Fullmoon Procession"	5:18
9.	"Menuett"	1:19
10.	"Prophecy Fulfilled/And the Dark Night Entered"	6:23
11.	"Courante"	1:10
12.	"Rachmaninov: Choir" (Rachmaninoff)	2:34
13.	"Lost (Robin's Song)" (live digipak bonus track)	4:38
Total length:		42:17

Note

- The choir tracks at the beginning and at the end of the record are an abridged and a complete version of "Rejoice, o virgin" from Sergei Rachmaninoff's choral work All-Night Vigil.

== Personnel ==
- Asis Nasseri – grunt vocals, guitars, kettle drums
- Luz Marsen – drums, percussion
- Andi Nad – bass
- Danny Klupp – guitars
- Karin Bodenmüller – soprano
- Hans Wolf – grand piano, piano, church organ keyboards
- Kathrin Pechlof – concert harp
- Fiffi Fuhrmann – tenore
- Christian – tenore
- Thomas Rosato – bass
- Christoph Zastrow – flute
- Florian Bartl – oboe
- Robert Müller – clarinet
- Andrea Sterr – violin
- Michael Stapf – violin
- Steffi Hertz – viola
- Kathrin Hertz – violoncello
- Georg Uttenthaler – doublebass
- Florian Schnellinger – percussion
- Peter Prysch – French horn

=== Guest musicians ===
- Evert Fratermann – orchestral percussion
- Ilka Mende – violin
- Fabian Schwarz – acoustic guitars

=== Voices of "Pestilencia" ===
- Ulrich Mühlmann – "Nostradamus"
- Carsten Jacob – "Monk"
- Christiane B.Horn – "Woman 1"
- Eveline Gerhardt – "Woman 2"
- Wolfgang Weißmüller – "Man"

=== Moscow Radio Choir ===
- Elena Rastvorova – conductor
- Olga Uschakova – soprano
- Maria Kutuzova – soprano
- Ekaterina Oblesova – alto
- Katja Prasolova – alto
- Vladimir Tarasov – tenor
- Oleg Kuzmin – tenor
- Anton Vasiljev – bass
- Evgeny Astafurov – bass
