= Belladonna (band) =

Italian rock band

- Origin: Rome, Italy
- Genres: 'Rock noir'
- Years active: 2005–present
- Members: Luana Caraffa; Dani Macchi; Martina Petrucci; Anastasia Angelini; Mattia Mari
- Website: www.belladonna.tv

Belladonna is an Italian rock band founded by songwriters Luana Caraffa and Dani Macchi. They have described their style of music as "Rock noir".

Being one of the most listened-to bands on MySpace, their first self-produced album Metaphysical Attraction entered the 2008 Grammy Awards ballot. They have released six albums and several singles, including Let There Be Light, written and recorded with British film composer Michael Nyman. They have toured all over the world, performed at SXSW and have supported Nine Inch Nails, Siouxsie and the Banshees, The Mars Volta, and Dita Von Teese. Belladonna's music has been used in the trailers of major Hollywood films, including Minions, Split, My Cousin Rachel, Godless, The Dark Tower, Black Panther, and Fahrenheit 11/9.

== Career ==
=== Metaphysical Attraction ===
Belladonna was formed on 14 February 2005 in Rome, Italy, by Luana Caraffa and Dani Macchi after forming "a songwriting partnership". During the course of the following months Belladonna wrote and recorded many songs, eleven of which would become their first full album: Metaphysical Attraction. Within months of creating a MySpace account in 2005, Belladonna became the most played Italian band on MySpace next to Lacuna Coil.

As Belladonna's celebrity status grew in 2006, they were interviewed by major media outlets such as GQ. Glamour magazine did a two-page photo spread on the band and their MySpace fame. In early 2007 National Italian television La7 resounded Belladonna's web popularity in a news story that described them as "the most listened to Italian band on MySpace".

In August 2007, Belladonna released the music video of Mystical Elysian Love which was filmed on location in Berlin, Germany. The video reached #73 on the worldwide YouTube most watched music videos chart on the same day it was released. In November 2007 Belladonna was the headliner musical act for the Erotica 07 event at The Grand Hall, Olympia in London. Sharing the stage with Belladonna at Erotica 07 was burlesque artist Dita Von Teese, Marilyn Manson's former wife. The attendance of the Erotica 07 event was estimated at over 100,000 people.

In 2008, two tracks from Belladonna's first album Metaphysical Attraction, Black Swan and Foreverland, were nominated in the Ballot of the 2008 Grammy Awards for Best Rock Performance By A Duo Or Group With Vocals (Category 16) and for Best Rock Song (Category 20).

=== The Noir Album ===
In June 2008, Belladonna collaborated with Sylvia Massy at Radiostar Studios to produce recordings for their second album. Sylvia Massy has produced bands such as Tool, System of a Down, Skunk Anansie, and Johnny Cash. In December 2008 Belladonna embarked on a promotional tour that included a show at The Fly in London.

Belladonna's second album The Noir Album was released on 6 March 2009. The band played showcases at the Key Club in Los Angeles (CA) on 16 March and at South by Southwest Festival (SXSW) in Austin, Texas on 18 March. In May 2009 Belladonna appeared the cover of the US magazine Muen with Lacuna Coil. From September 2009 the album's first single Till Death Do Us Part received airplay on UK's BBC Four, where Iron Maiden singer Bruce Dickinson aired it on his Friday Rock Show.

=== On tour around the world ===
In June 2009, Belladonna played a show as special guests to Guns N' Roses/Velvet Revolver bass player Duff McKagan's band Loaded, and in an open-air music festival in Milan with Mars Volta, Korn and Nine Inch Nails

In October 2009, Belladonna performed at the Fonda Theater in Los Angeles alongside other well-known Italian artists such as Franco Battiato, Giovanni Allevi, and Afterhours.

On 26 November 2009, Belladonna played a UK showcase at The Garage in London.

In 2010, Belladonna toured Belgium once and the UK twice, and gigged regularly around Italy.

=== Collaboration with Michael Nyman ===
In December 2010, Belladonna released Let There Be Light, a single written in collaboration with English composer Michael Nyman and based on his The Heart Asks Pleasure First from the soundtrack of the Jane Campion movie The Piano. Michael Nyman himself plays piano on the track.

=== And There Was Light ===
In August 2010, the band started pre-production on their third album And There Was Light, which they recorded in November in Los Angeles., produced by Dani Macchi with the help of Grammy-nominated producer Alex Elena and of Metallica's Metallica (album) engineer Mike Tacci, and mixed by Macchi in the band's studio in Rome. The album features several musical guests, including Imani Coppola and Ruby Friedman, as well as spoken word contributions by British occultist Aleister Crowley and German psychologist Carl Jung

In May 2011, And There Was Light was released on iTunes worldwide. The album enters the Italian iTunes Top 100, and reaches the number one spot in the CD Baby chart of the best selling rock albums worldwide.

In September 2011, Belladonna are mentioned alongside Nine Inch Nails, Moby and Marilyn Manson in Mötley Crüe's frontman Vince Neil's autobiography Tattoos and Tequila as one of the most important acts that have been influenced by Mötley Crüe in recent years.

=== Touring Europe ===
Belladonna went on tour around Europe during 2012, playing shows in Austria, Switzerland, Italy, Luxembourg, The Netherlands, Belgium, Germany and Czech Republic.

In May 2012, Belladonna's guitar player Dani Macchi was voted Best Italian Indie Guitar Player in a poll organized by MEI, the official Italian Indie Labels Association.

=== The Sweet Child O' Mine single ===
In March 2013, Belladonna released a cover of the Guns N' Roses track Sweet Child O' Mine and made it available on iTunes, and as free download on their SoundCloud page.

=== Shooting Dice with God ===
On 22 April 2013, Belladonna released their fourth album Shooting Dice with God. The video of the first single off the album, Karma Warrior, gets featured as an exclusive preview on the Rolling Stone Italy website.

The band went immediately on tour all over Europe to support this album release.

On 26 February 2014, Belladonna played a headline show in London's legendary rock venue The Borderline

=== The Undress Your Soul single ===
On 10 June 2015, Belladonna released Undress Your Soul a song written and produced in collaboration with renowned Italian film composer Pasquale Catalano, based on his music of Italian cult TV series Romanzo criminale – La serie. The track's video is premiered on Italy's best-selling newspaper La Repubblica's website

=== The God Below single in a Minions TV spot ===
In July 2015, the Belladonna single The God Below is used in the Fifty Shades of Yellow international TV spot of the animation movie Minions.

=== The Orchestral Album ===
The 23 March 2016, the band released The Orchestral Album, featuring 10 songs from their catalogue completely re-arranged and recorded with a concert orchestra featuring many of Ennio Morricone's regular orchestral players and conducted by Kazakh arranger/conductor Angelina Yershova, who co-produced the album with Belladonna's guitarist and producer Dani Macchi.

=== The Belladonna Soundscape Collection Vol.1 ===
In 2017, Belladonna released The Belladonna Soundscape Collection Vol.1, a film industry-only release of over 200 instrumental tracks all recorded using exclusively original elements from their albums. During the course of the same year tracks from this collection are used in the trailers and TV spots of big-budget Hollywood movies such as Split, My Cousin Rachel, and The Dark Tower. The band then gets commissioned to write music for the trailer of the Marvel movie Black Panther, released in October 2017.

=== The Spiders of Gomorrah single in a Netflix trailer ===
In November 2017, Belladonna released the single Spiders of Gomorrah. The song is featured in the trailer of the Netflix series Godless.

=== Belladonna's guitarist at The Voice of Italy and on Michael Moore's Fahrenheit 11/9 trailer ===
In 2018, Belladonna's guitarist Dani Macchi was chosen by Lacuna Coil's Cristina Scabbia to be the vocal coach of her team on the 2018 edition of the tv talent show The Voice of Italy. In August 2018 Dani Macchi is featured in the trailer of Michael Moore's movie Fahrenheit 11/9, performing a rock guitar version of "The Star-Spangled Banner".

=== No Star Is Ever Too Far ===
In January 2019, the band released its sixth album No Star Is Ever Too Far. Three of its songs have been licensed in international movies and trailers: The Turing Sniper is featured in Remember Me, My Love, the Gabriele Muccino drama featuring Monica Bellucci, Black Beauty is featured in the Michael Moore documentary movie Fahrenheit 11/9, and We Belong To Hell is included in the international tv spot of the thriller My Cousin Rachel.

=== The New Future Travelogue NFT auction ===
On the 17th of March 2021 Belladonna put up for auction their new single New Future Travelogue, and become the first artists in the world to auction a song as a 1-of-1 NFT (Non-Fungible token), making the auction winner the only person to own a copy of the song, and including in the sale the song’s Master rights.

=== The collaboration with Carlo Rovelli ===
In November 2022 Belladonna released the single Nothing Shines Unless It Burns, recorded with theoretical physicist and author Carlo Rovelli, The single was also auctioned off as a 1-of-1 NFT. In October 2023 the song enters the Grammy Awards ballot in the Best Rock Song category

=== The Elysian Lovers ===
On May, the 18th 2026 Luana Caraffa and Dani Macchi publish a single titled Home (Now That The Sun Shines The Light Of Your Smile) under the band name The Elysian Lovers.

== Band members ==
- Luana Caraffa – vocals
- Dani Macchi – guitar
- Martina Petrucci – piano
- Anastasia Angelini – bass
- Mattia Mari – drums

== Discography ==
=== Albums ===
- Metaphysical Attraction (2006)
- The Noir Album (2009)
- And There Was Light (2011)
- Shooting Dice with God (2013)
- The Orchestral Album (2016)
- No Star Is Ever Too Far (2019)
