= The Bones of Avalon =

2010 novel by Phil Rickman

- First edition
- Author: Phil Rickman
- Language: English
- Series: The John Dee Papers
- Genre: Historical novel
- Publisher: Atlantic Books (England)
- Publication date: 1 April 2010
- Publication place: England
- Media type: Print (Hardback)
- Pages: 480
- ISBN: 978-1848872707

The Bones of Avalon is a novel in first-person narrative mode by Phil Rickman. It is about John Dee, who investigates undercover on Her Majesty's Service. It was followed by The Heresy of Dr Dee.

== Plot ==
=== Part 1 ===
John Dee is visited by Elizabeth I of England at Mortlake. She implies she wants to do some research on "our royal ancestor" King Arthur. Subsequently, her Secretary of State Sir William Cecil assigns him to seize King Arthur's bones. This would finally refute the still popular myth of King Arthur's messianic return. Sir William Cecil wants to have Arthur's bones "formally presented" to the Queen by Dee, who Her Majesty considers "her Merlin".

=== Part 2 ===
John Dee arrives in Glastonbury, where according to Giraldus Cambrensis some centuries ago a successful excavation of King Arthur's remains had taken place. When Dee's supporter Robert Dudley falls seriously ill, the local healer Eleanor Borrow is charged with curing him. She fetches mineral water from the Chalice Well because she thinks it increases the impact of her herbal medicine. Later, when the mutilated corpse of Dudley's servant is found, Eleanor Borrow is suspected of murdering him as part of a satanic ritual.

=== Part 3 ===
John Dee learns that Queen Elizabeth is haunted by nightmares because it is unclear what happened to Arthur's bones. Still his search remains futile. He meets secretly with Eleanor Borrow. She informs him that her late mother worked with John Leland. Craving visions he talks her into giving him some of her mother's most dangerous elixir. When he awakens after his trip, she has disappeared.

=== Part 4 ===
John Dee continues his search and even excavates Eleanor Borrow's mother. In her coffin he finds a map she made together with the famous antiquarian John Leland. This reveals to him what Richard Whiting wouldn't disclose even under the most severe torture. But Eleanor has been arrested and sentenced to death.

=== Part 5 ===
John detects the lost books of the destroyed Glastonbury Abbey. Here he also encounters Michel de Nostredame who discloses to him how the Jesuits intend to replace the Protestant Queen Elizabeth with Mary Stuart.

== Characters ==
- John Dee is so famous counterfeit pamphlets are sold under his name, this making him an early victim of brand piracy
- Francis Walsingham is the Queen's spymaster
- Blanche Parry is Elizabeth I of England's lady-in-waiting and also John Dee's cousin
- Sir William Cecil has already served Lady Jane Grey and Mary I of England
- Edmund Bonner is an English bishop who warns that French Catholics take the current English Queen for a witch.
- Peter Carew is an adventurer who leads John Dee to Glastonbury
- Robert Dudley, 1st Earl of Leicester pretends to be a member of the Queen's Commission on Antiquities
- Sir Edmund Fyche is a local authority who once hanged Eleanor's mother for alleged necromancy and accuses Eleanor too
- Joan Tyrre is a woman who cherishes folklore and believes in it.

== Historical inaccuracies ==
Phil Rickman admits in the book's Notes and Credits that according to contemporary records Joan Tyrre lived in Taunton.

== Reception ==
The novel received mixed reviews. Jennifer Monahan Winberry considered Rickman's tale enjoyable for connoisseurs of the Arthurian legend but also for aficionados of the Elizabethan era. Margaret Donsbach wrote the plot progressed "slow-moving at times" but a readership "interested in the Renaissance approach to science and the occult" would appreciate the novel as "an authentic, insightful portrayal of the period". Amanda Gillies praised Rickman for his diligent research and strongly recommended his novel for readers who relish historical crime stories. Kirkus Reviews published a similar opinion and judged Rickman had described historical persons "with admirable scholarship and verve". Publishers Weekly reviewer on the other hand complained Rickman's novel wouldn't "do justice to the intriguing Dee" and pointed out that Dee also was a mathematician.
