= Phil Rickman =

British author (1950–2024)

- Born: 6 March 1950; Lancashire, England
- Died: 29 October 2024 (aged 74)
- Occupations: Journalist; novelist
- Writing career
- Pen name: Thom Madley, Will Kingdom
- Language: English
- Period: 1991–2024
- Genres: Supernatural; mystery novels
- Notable work: The Bones of Avalon
- Website: philrickman.co.uk

Phil Rickman (6 March 1950 – 29 October 2024), also known under the pen names Thom Madley and Will Kingdom, was a British author of supernatural and mystery novels.

== Biography ==
Rickman was born on 6 March 1950 in Lancashire and worked as a journalist for BBC World Service TV and BBC Radio 4. He published his first book, Candlenight, in 1991, and began his Merrily Watkins series in 1998. In 2010, he began the John Dee Papers series, which focused on the English mathematician and astrologer, John Dee.

Rickman also worked on several music albums based upon his books and helped write many of the albums' songs. He lived in Wales for most of his life and resided in Hay-on-Wye with his wife as of 2020. He presented the BBC Radio Wales book programme Phil the Shelf.

Rickman researched the folklore, religion, and supernatural themes of his books, saying "If I can't believe it, it doesn't go in". He also voiced his unhappiness over his earlier critics which labeled him a horror writer. He said that he felt that the books did not fit neatly within that genre.

Rickman died on 29 October 2024, aged 74.

== Bibliography ==
=== Standalone novels ===
- Candlenight (1991)
- Crybbe (Curfew in the United States) (1993)
- The Man in the Moss (1994)
- December (1994)
- The Chalice (1997)
- The Cold Calling (1998, as Will Kingdom)
- Mean Spirit (2001, as Will Kingdom)
- Night After Night (2014)

=== John Dee Papers ===
1. The Bones of Avalon (2010)
2. The Heresy of Dr Dee (2012)

=== Marco series ===
1. Marco's Pendulum (2006, as Thom Madley)
2. Marco and the Blade of Night (2007, as Thom Madley)

=== Merrily Watkins series ===
1. The Wine of Angels (1998)
2. Midwinter of the Spirit (1999)
3. A Crown of Lights (2001)
4. The Cure of Souls (2001)
5. The Lamp of the Wicked (2002)
6. The Prayer of the Night Shepherd (2004)
7. The Smile of a Ghost (2005)
8. The Remains of an Altar (2006)
9. The Fabric of Sin (2007)
10. To Dream of the Dead (2008)
11. The Secrets of Pain (2011)
12. The Magus of Hay (2013)
13. Friends of the Dusk (2015)
14. All of a Winter's Night (2017)
15. The Fever of the World (2022)
16. The Echo of Crows (2025)

==== Short stories ====
1. The House of Susan Lulham - was first published in the Oxfam "Oxcrimes" anthology (May 2014). In December 2014, an extended version which is "five times as long" was published for Kindle.

==== Non-fiction ====
- Merrily's Border: The Places in Herefordshire & the Marches Behind the Merrily Watkins Novels (with photographer John Mason) (2009)

== Discography ==
- Songs from Lucy's Cottage (2009, by Lol Robinson and Hazey Jane II)
- A Message from the Morning (2010, by Lol Robinson and Hazey Jane II)
- Abbey Tapes: the Exorcism (2011, by Philosopher's Stone, based upon the novel December)

== Television ==
The second Merrily Watkins book Midwinter of the Spirit was made into a three-part TV drama by ITV. The Cast included Anna Maxwell-Martin as Merrily, Sally Messham as Jane, and David Threlfall as Huw Owen. It was released in late 2015.
