= Kodakarajima =

Island within the Ryukyu Islands

Native name: Japanese: 小宝島
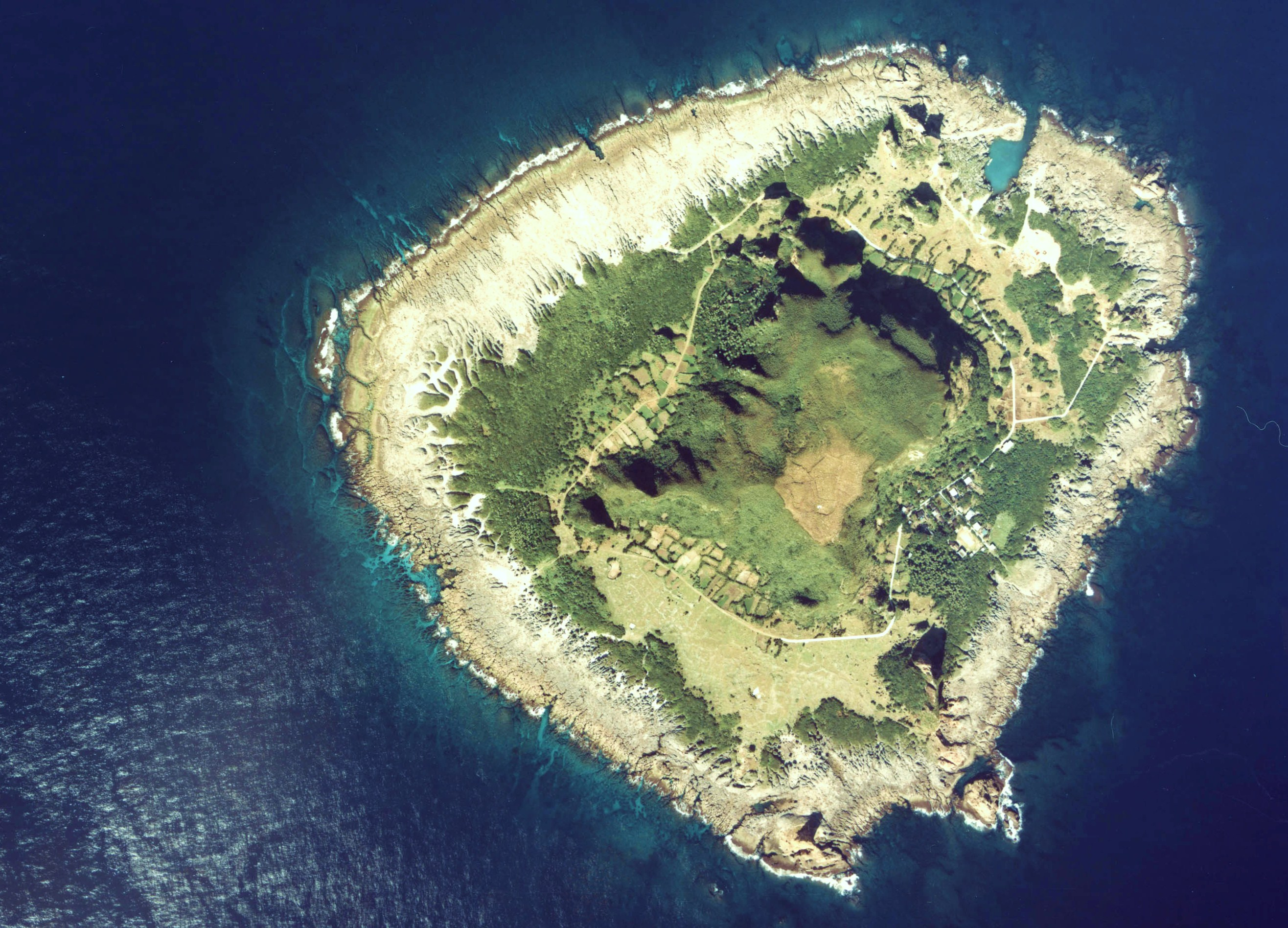
- Aerial Photograph of Kodakarajima

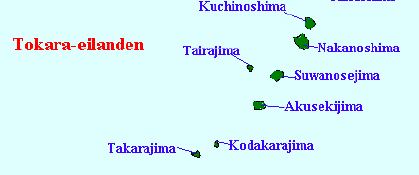

Geography
- Location: East China Sea
- Coordinates: 29°13′26″N 129°19′39″E
- Archipelago: Tokara Islands
- Area: 1.0 km^{2} (0.39 sq mi)
- Coastline: 4.74 km (2.945 mi)
- Highest elevation: 103 m (338 ft)

Administration
- Japan
- Kagoshima Prefecture

Demographics
- Population: 49 (2004)
- Pop. density: 49/km^{2} (127/sq mi)
- Ethnic groups: Japanese

Kodakarajima (小宝島), literally "small treasure island", is one of the Tokara Islands, belonging to Kagoshima Prefecture. The island, 1.0 km² in area, is the smallest inhabited island in the archipelago, and has a population of 49 people. The island can only be reached by boat as it has no airport; there is regular ferry service to the city of Kagoshima on the mainland. Travel time is about 13 hours. The islanders are dependent mainly on fishing and seasonal tourism.

== Geography ==
Kodakarajima is the second southernmost inhabited island in the Tokara archipelago, and is located 73 kilometres (39 nmi) southwest from Nakanoshima and 12 kilometres (6.5 nmi) north from Takarajima. The central peak has a height of 102 metres (335 ft) above sea level. There is a hot spring, Yudomari-onsen on the island, with water temperatures reaching 90 deg C. The island is surrounded by a coral reef, and has a number of limestone pinnacles on its coastline. The local climate is classified as subtropical, with a rainy season from May through September.

== History ==
The island was once part of the Ryukyu Kingdom. During the Edo period, Kodakarajima was part of Satsuma Domain and was administered as part of Kawabe District. In 1896, the island was transferred to the administrative control of Ōshima District, Kagoshima, and from 1911 was administered as part of the village of Toshima, Kagoshima. From 1946 to 1952, the island was administered by the United States as part of the Provisional Government of Northern Ryukyu Islands.
