= Eppur si muove (album) =

Studio album by Haggard
- Released: 2004
- Genre: Symphonic metal
- Length: 50:16
- Label: Drakkar Entertainment
- Producer: Dieter Roth

Haggard chronology
Awaking the Gods: Live in Mexico (2001)	Eppur si muove (2004)	Tales of Ithiria (2008)

Professional ratings
Review scores
Source	Rating
Metal Storm	9/10 stars
Tartarean Desire	8.5/10 stars

Eppur si muove is the third full-length album by the German symphonic metal band Haggard. It was released on 26 April 2004 by Drakkar Entertainment.

The album is based on the life of the Italian astronomer Galileo Galilei (1564–1642), who, according to legend, muttered the phrase eppur si muove 'and yet it does move', after being forced to recant, in front of the Inquisition, his belief that the earth moved around the sun.

In 2021, it was elected by Metal Hammer as the 23rd best symphonic metal album.

== Track listing ==
No.	Title	English translation*	Length
1.	"All'inizio è la morte"	At the Beginning stands Death	6:50
2.	"Menuetto in Fa-minore"	Minuet in F-minor	1:16
3.	"Per aspera ad astra"	Through Hardships, to the Stars	6:40
4.	"Of a Might Divine"	–	8:20
5.	"Gavotta in Si-minore"	Gavot in B-minor	0:58
6.	"Herr Mannelig"	Sir Mannelig	4:50
7.	"The Observer"	–	4:40
8.	"Eppur si muove"	And Yet, it Moves	8:19
9.	"Larghetto / Epilogo adagio"	Tempo / Epilog Adagio	2:13
10.	"Herr Mannelig (short version)"	–	6:10

* English translations not official.

The short version of Herr Mannelig clocks at 3:20; after two minutes of silence, a hidden track starts.

=== Limited edition ===
The limited edition includes two bonus tracks.

1. "De la morte noir" (The Black Death) – 7:59
2. "Robin's Song" – 4:36

It also includes a DVD, containing five Wacken Open Air 1998 videos and a bonus video clip.

1. "Requiem"
2. "In a Pale Moon's Shadow"
3. "Cantus firmus" (Chant of Strength)
4. "De la morte noir"
5. "Lost (Robin)"
6. "In a Pale Moon's Shadow" (bonus video clip)
