= And Thou Shalt Trust... the Seer =

Studio album by Haggard
- Released: 15 October 1997
- Recorded: 1997
- Studios: Pauper's Inn Studios, Munich
- Genres: Symphonic metal, death-doom
- Length: 41:26
- Label: Last Episode
- Producers: Chris Void, Haggard

Haggard chronology
And Thou Shalt Trust... the Seer (1997)	Awaking the Centuries (2000)

Professional ratings
Review scores
Source	Rating
Sputnikmusic	4.5/5 stars

And Thou Shalt Trust... the Seer is the first full-length album by the German symphonic metal band Haggard. It was released on 15 October 1997 by Last Episode. The painting of the cover is Melencolia I by Albrecht Dürer. The album was re-released as a vinyl record in 2008 by Nattvind Records.

== Track listing ==
No.	Title	Length
1.	"Chapter I: The Day as Heaven Wept"	5:46
2.	"Chapter II: Origin of a Crystal Soul"	5:55
3.	"Chapter II: Requiem in D minor"	2:08
4.	"Chapter III: In a Pale Moon's Shadow"	9:38
5.	"Chapter III: Cantus Firmus in A minor"	2:32
6.	"Chapter IV: De la Morte Noire"	8:02
7.	"Chapter V: Lost (Robin's Song)"	4:25
8.	"Outro: A Midnight Gathering"	2:59
Total length:		46:26

== Credits ==
- Asis Nasseri – vocals, grunts, guitars
- Luz Marsen – drums, kettledrums
- Andi Nad – bass guitar
- Danny Klupp – guitars, acoustic guitars
- Karin Bodenmüller – soprano
- Sasema – soprano
- Florian Schnellinger – bass vocals
- Hans Wolf – piano, cembalo, keyboards
- Kathrin Pechlof – harp
- Kerstin Krainer – violin
- Steffi Hertz – viola
- Kathrin Hertz – violoncello
- Christoph V. Zastrow – flute
- Robert Müller – clarinet
- Florian Bartl – oboe
- Fiffi Fuhrmann – crumhorn
