= Nostradamus (video game) =

1993 video game

- Developer: Face
- Publisher: Face
- Platform: Arcade
- Release: 1993
- Genre: Scrolling shooter
- Modes: Single-player, multiplayer

Nostradamus is a vertically scrolling shooter released as an arcade video game by Face in 1993. Players control either Dalas (player one) or Joanna (player two) to shoot down many different enemies and then defeat the level boss to advance through the game's nine stages.

== Plot ==
According to one of Nostradamus' supposed prophecies, in July 1999, a great leader would come from the sky to rebirth an old ruler over a lost province on Earth. In the game's story, this prediction comes true in the form of an alien invasion. Originating from Saturn, the alien invasion force quickly attacks many locations on Earth in preparation for an even bigger assault and possible complete global domination. Efforts are put into the design of advanced space fighters and mecha along with the best fighter pilots - in this case, pilots Dalas and Joanna - to combat the Saturnites and dispel any further doom prophecies from materializing on Earth.

== Gameplay ==
The Normal Shot of the player ship differed depending on the player; For Player 1's ship, the more power-ups the player obtained, the more the Normal Shots loop behind the ship whereas Player 2's ship would provide more forward-firing shots. The player ship has an Option weapon called the Energy Boost Accelerator (EBA). Once selected, the player can charge the system up forming an energy barrier behind the ship which serves as a shield that protects the ship from rear attacks. Once the player releases the button, the EBA will unleash an attack.

There are two varieties of EBA attack which are dependent on the color of the EBA: the blue EBA unleashes the Plasmic Wave which is a large blue laser beam that covers the front and back of the ship while the red EBA is the Phoenix Wave, a short-range fire blast that covers the front of the ship. The blue EBA also provides homing plasma shots while the red EBA provides fireball shots. The only other pick-up items were Bonus Points, 1Ups and Power-Up gems. Each EBA has a mid-charge shot that provides different attacks. The Blue mid-charge shot provides a backward and forward firing laser beam while the red EBA provides a longer range, but weaker full charge shot. If shot, the player had but a few seconds to steer the ship into any remaining enemies before it exploded, which serves as a last second attack.

== Reception ==
In Japan, Game Machine listed Nostradamus on their November 1, 1993 issue as being the twenty-fifth most-successful table arcade unit of the month.
