= Haggard (band) =

German symphonic metal band

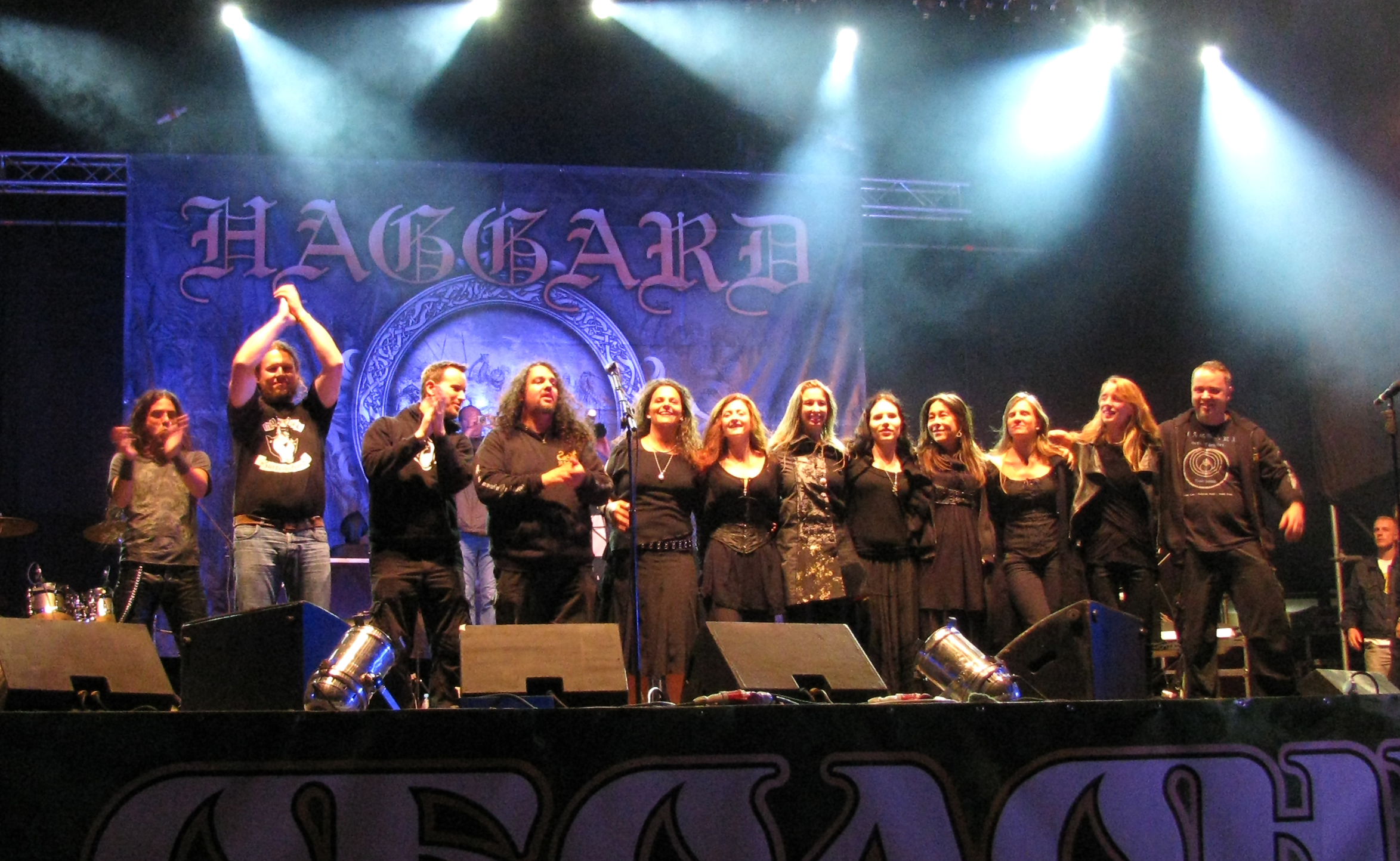
- Haggard at Global East Rock Festival 2010 in Kyiv, Ukraine

Background information
- Origin: Germany
- Genres: Symphonic metal, death metal (early)
- Years active: 1989–present (on hold since 2017)
- Members: Full list
- Website: haggard.de

Haggard (/ˈhæɡərd/) is a German symphonic metal band founded in 1989 that combines classical music and early music with metal.

== History ==
Haggard started in 1989 as a death metal band. After their 1992 demo, Introduction, they switched to a style featuring symphonic melodies and classical instruments with folk themes. The 1997 album And Thou Shalt Trust... the Seer was their breakthrough. After their second, Nostradamus-based album, Awaking the Centuries, they toured through Mexico twice.

Before the release of Awaking the Centuries, the group had its highest number of musicians at 21. Singer and guitarist Asis Nasseri writes all their songs.

In 2004, they released their third album, Eppur Si Muove, about the life of Italian scholar Galileo Galilei, arrested for heresy for supporting Copernicus' claim that the Earth revolved around the Sun. Metal Hammer elected the album the 23rd best symphonic metal album in 2021.

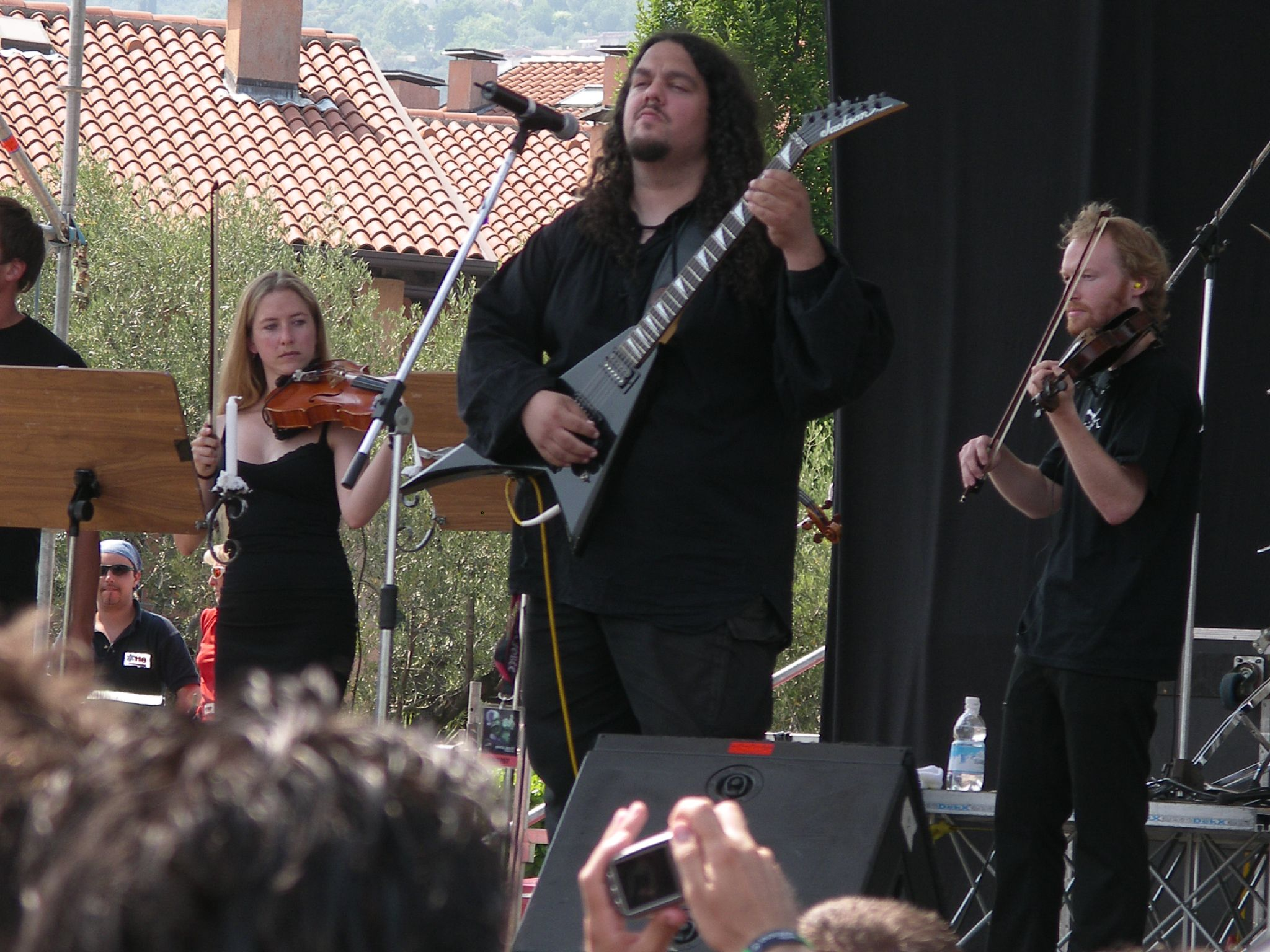
Haggard in 2006

The fourth album, Tales of Ithiria, was released in 2008 and is based on a fantasy story.

Since 2008, Italian bassist Giacomo Astorri has collaborated with Haggard as a stable member. Besides Haggard, Astorri has played in various metal bands, including The Dogma, Infernal Angels (guitar), ZAP (bass), and Italian doom metal band Stryx. Astorri is a professional concert and event photographer.

In 2010, the band played its first concert with a symphonic orchestra. Haggard performed with the philharmonic orchestra of Plovdiv in Plovdiv on 19 April 2010.

They announced the album Grimm for the end of 2012 but postponed it indefinitely. The band has been inactive since, apart from occasional concerts.

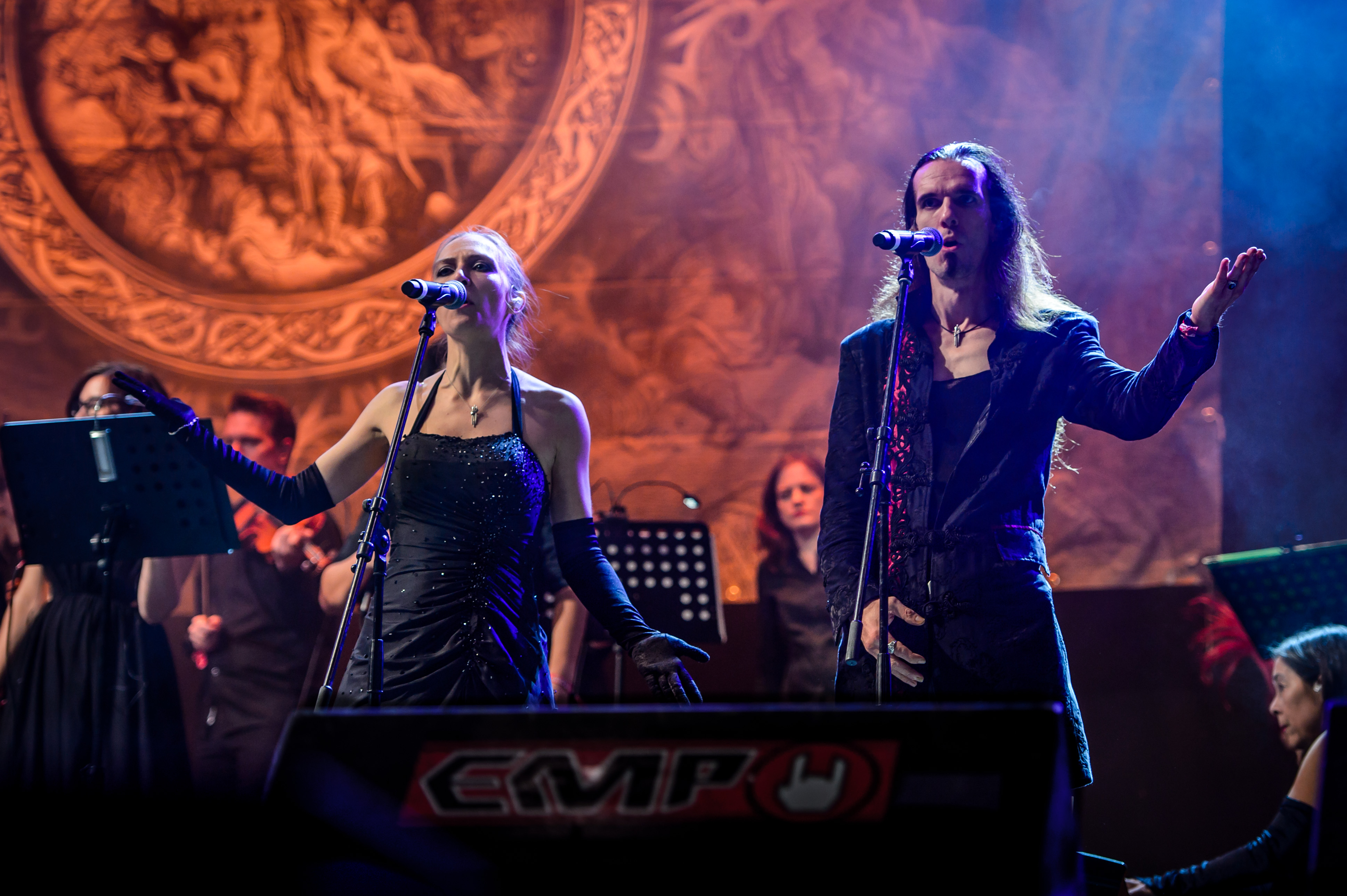
Haggard at Summer Breeze Festival 2017

== Members ==
=== Current members ===
- Asis Nasseri – vocals, guitar (1991–present)
- Giacomo Astorri – bass
- Janika Groß – soprano
- Frank Schumacher – tenor vocals
- Claudio Quarta – guitar
- Aline Deinert – violin
- Ivica Kramheller – double bass
- Lisa Hellmich – viola
- Anne Eberlein – viola
- Cosmin Nechita – violin
- Johannes Schleiermacher – violoncello (cello)
- Florinda Hoffmann – violoncello (cello)
- Hans Wolf – piano, keyboards, organ, harpsichord
- Ingrid Nietzer – piano, keyboards
- Licia Missori – piano, keyboards
- Maurizio Guolo – drums, percussion (2012–present)
- Stefana Sabau – oboe
- Catalina Popa – flute
- Veronika Kramheller – soprano
- Michel Schumm – drums, percussion
- Michel Stapf – violin

=== Past members ===
- Florian Bartl – oboe, English horn
- Judith Marschall – violin
- Fiffi Fuhrmann – tenor vocals, bass
- Dorothea Zelinsky – violin
- Mark Pendry – clarinet
- Sasema – vocals
- Gaby Koss – soprano vocals
- Robert von Greding – clarinet
- Christoph von Zastrow – flute
- Danny Klupp – guitar
- Kathrin Pechlof – harp
- Karin Bodemüller – vocals
- Florian Schnellinger – percussion
- Andi Nad – bass
- Robin Fischer – bass
- Andi Hemberger – vocals
- Kathrin Hertz – cello
- Andreas Peschke – flute
- Manuela Kraller – soprano vocals
- Susanne Ehlers – soprano vocals
- Veronika Kramheller – soprano vocals
- Michael Stapf – violin
- Andreas Fuchs – horn, percussion
- Linda Antonetti – oboe
- Steffi Hertz – viola
- Patrizia Krug – cello
- Luz Marsen – drum
- Michael Schumm – classical percussion, drum
- Ally Storch-Hukriede – violin

In addition to the 16 band members, more than 10 guest artists and musicians were involved in the making of the album Eppur si muove.

== Discography ==
=== Studio albums ===
Year	Title	Peak positions	
Year	Title	GER	SWI
1997	And Thou Shalt Trust... the Seer	—	—
2000	Awaking the Centuries	64	—
2004	Eppur si muove	47	—
2008	Tales of Ithiria	37	89

=== Demos ===
- Introduction (1992)
- Progressive (1994)
- Once... Upon a December's Dawn (1995)

=== Live albums ===
- Awaking the Gods: Live in Mexico (2001)

=== DVDs and videos ===
- In a Pale Moon's Shadow (1998)
- Awaking the Gods: Live in Mexico (DVD/VHS) (2001)
