= Particles of the Kagoshima dialects =

Grammatical aspect of the Japanese Kagoshima dialects

The grammatical particles (助詞 joshi) used in the Kagoshima dialects of Japanese have many features in common with those of other dialects spoken in Kyūshū, with some being unique to the Kagoshima dialects. Like standard Japanese particles, they act as suffixes, adpositions or words immediately following the noun, verb, adjective or phrase that they modify, and are used to indicate the relationship between the various elements of a sentence.

Unlike central Japanese dialects, particles in the Kagoshima dialects are bound clitics, as they have the effect of resyllabifying the last word they attach to. So, for example, the standard forms 本を hon o "book ACC", 書きを kaki o "writing ACC" and まりを mari o "ball ACC" would be realized as /hoNno/, /kakjo/ and /majo/ ( ← /maɽjo/) in most of northern and central Kagoshima, and /hoNnu/, /kakju/~/kaku/ and /maju/ ( ← /maɽju/) in parts of Kagoshima's southern mainland.

Resyllabification has also led to the reanalysis of some particles in a few dialects. For instance, the topic particle (w)a has been completely superseded by the form na in Izumi, which in most mainland dialects is merely a variant of (w)a after a moraic nasal.

== Resyllabification rules ==
When a word is followed by a particle that starts with a vowel (such as the topic particle は a, the accusative particle を o or the dative particle い i), the final syllable of that word will be fused with the particle and be subject to Kagoshima's vowel coalescence rules as well as other sound changes occurring in the regional dialect. As a simple example, when the word これ /koɽe/ kore "this" is followed by the topic particle は /a/, it becomes こりゃ /koɽja/ korya "this=TOP". A secondary sound change in Mainland Kagoshima then causes the medial /ɽj/ ry to become /j/ y, giving the common form こや /koja/ koya "this=TOP".

Two main exceptions to this rule exist:

1. If a word's underlying form ends in a moraic nasal (i.e. /N/), an epenthetic /n/ is inserted between the word and the particle. For example, 本 /hoN/ hon "book" becomes 本は /hoNna/ honna when fused with the topic particle.
2. If a word's underlying form ends in a long vowel or sequence of vowels, then an epenthetic consonant is sometimes inserted between the word and the particle. In the case of topic particle は a and the accusative particle を o, the epenthetic consonant is /w/. In the case of the dative particle い i, the epenthetic consonant is /n/. This rule is not consistently applied across all dialects of Kagoshima.

The following table shows how particles change the final syllable of words in the mainland Kagoshima dialects.

Resyllabification in mainland Kagoshima
Meaning	Underlying form	Pronunciation in isolation	Topic particle (は (w)a)	Accusative particle (を o)	Dative particle (い i)
this	/koɽe/	/koi/	/koja/	/kojo/	/koɽe/
writing	/kaki/	/kaQ/	/kakja/ or /kaka/	/kakjo/ or /kaku/	/kaki/
ball	/maɽi/	/mai/	/maja/	/majo/	/maɽi/
song	/uta/	/uta/	/uta/	/utao/	/ute/
hitting	/ut͡ɕi/	/uQ/	/ut͡ɕa/	/ut͡ɕo/, /ut͡ɕu/ or /ut͡su/	/ut͡ɕi/
person	/hito/	/hito/	/hita/	/hito/	/hite/
study	/beNkjoo/	/beNkjo/	/beNkjoa/	/beNkjoo/	/beNkjoi/
book	/hoN/	/hoN/	/hoNna/	/hoNno/	/hoNni/

The rules of resyllabification differ only slightly in peripheral areas. The following table shows how particles change the final syllable of words in the Sato dialect of the Koshikijima Islands.

Resyllabification in the Sato village of Koshikijima
Meaning	Underlying form	Pronunciation in isolation	Topic particle (は (w)a)	Dative particle (い i)
this	/koɽe/	/koi/	/koɽaa/	/koɽee/
thing	/mono/	/mono/	/monaa/	/monee/
song	/uta/	/uta/	/utaa/	/utjaa/
hitting	/ut͡ɕi/	/ut͡ɕi/	/ut͡ɕaa/	/ut͡ɕii/
ticket	/ɸuda/	/ɸuda/	/ɸudaa/	/ɸudjaa/
river	/kawa/	/kawa/	/kawaa/	/kawjaa/
lye	/aaku/	/aaku/	/aakaa/	/aakii/

- Note: The accusative particle (を o) is not listed above because the Sato dialect replaced it with the particle ば ba. For example, the accusative form of koi "this" is simply koi ba.

And the following table shows how particles change the final syllable of words in the Tanegashima dialects.

Resyllabification in Tanegashima
Meaning	Underlying form	Pronunciation in isolation	Topic particle (は (w)a)	Accusative particle (を o)	Dative particle (い i)
this	/kore/		/kora/ or /korja/	/korjo/	
person	/hito/	/hito/	/hitaa/	/hitoo/	
sugar	/satoo/	/satoo/	/satoowa/		
now	/ima/	/ima/	/imoo/		
time	/toki/	/toki/	/tokjaa/		
candy	/ame/	/ame/		/ameo/	
oil	/ɕekiju/	/ɕekiju/		/ɕekijoo/	
mountain	/jama/	/jamaa/			/jamaai/
care	/jood͡ʑiN/	/jood͡ʑiN/		/jood͡ʑiNno/	

- Note: Blank entries indicate that examples could not be found or inferred from the source.

=== Historical attestation ===
The phenomenon of resyllabification (or particle fusion) is first attested for the Kagoshima dialect in the 18th-century works of Gonza, a Japanese castaway from Satsuma who was taken to Saint Petersburg, Russia around 1733-1734. Under the supervision of assistant librarian Andrei Bogdanov, Gonza helped produce several reference works on the Japanese language in Russian, including an introductory, a grammar and a dictionary. These works provide the oldest glimpse into the Kagoshima dialect.

For the most part, the works of Gonza show that the topic particle は a and the dative particle い i followed the same rules as they do today, fusing with the final syllable of the preceding word and being subject to the same exceptions that exist today. The accusative particle を wo, however, was independent and shows fusion in only a couple recorded examples.

Topic particle は a
Meaning	Recorded example	Modern standard Japanese
Thief	núsda	盗人は nusuto wa
Cow, heifer	úsha	牝牛は meushi wa
Autumn	akyà	秋は aki wa
Night	yorà	夜は yoru wa
I	óra	俺は ore wa

Dative particle い i (recorded as n after a long vowel)
Meaning	Recorded example	Modern standard Japanese
Country	kúni	国に kuni ni
Person	ftè	人に hito ni
Garden	níwe	庭に niwa ni
One generation	íchden	一代に ichidai ni
I	óre	俺に ore ni

Accusative particle を wo
Meaning	Recorded example	Modern standard Japanese
Write a character	ʒó kak	字を書く ji o kaku
What	nányu	何を nani o
Country	kún wo	国を kuni o
Me	ói wo	俺を ore o

== Comparison with Amami and standard Japanese ==
The following table gives an overview of some of the main particles used in Kagoshima as compared to those used in Northern Amami, a language group spoken directly to the south of the Kagoshima dialects, as well as standard Japanese.

Comparison of particles between Kagoshima, Amami and standard Japanese
	Kagoshima			Amami			Standard Japanese
	Kagoshima city	Ei, Minamikyūshū	Koshikijima	Kikai	Ura	Sani	Standard Japanese
Genitive	ga, no	ŋa, no / N	ga, no	nu	ga / ka, nu	nu / n	no
Nominative	ga, no	ŋa	ga, no	ŋa, nu	ka, nu / n	ga, nu	ga, no
Accusative	o / u	o / u, Ø	ba	Ø	ba	Ø	o
Accusative (topicalized)	oba / uba	oba / uba^{[a]}	ba	yooba / ooba / ba	ba	ba	o
Dative	i / ni	i / N	i / ni	n^{y}i	nji	ni	ni
Purposive	ke	ge^{[a]}	kyaa / ikyaa	kai, kachi / ɡachi, kan^{y}i, en	iga / ga	iga / ga	ni
Locative / Directional	i / ni, see	i / N, same, ʑe	de	ʑi, ʑeɴ, en	nan, nantï, ji, nanji	nantï, (t)chi	ni, e, de
Instrumental	de	ʑe	de	ʑi, ʑeɴ, en	shi	si	de
Instrumental (means of travel)	kara	ʑe	kara	ʑi, ʑeɴ, en	shi	si	de
Ablative	kara	gara	kara	kara	ra / raga	raga	kara
Comitative / coordinating	to	to	to	tu	tu	tu	to
Comparative	yokka / yoka	yokka^{[a]}	yuukya	yukka	(n)kuma	nika	yori
Terminative	gii, zui, made	dʑui	zui, made	gari, madi	garï	garï	made
Quotative	to, chi	to,^{[a]} chi^{[a]}	to, tte	chi, ten	chi	tchi	to, tte

1. These forms are not attested in the referenced source, but are inferred based on the Kagoshima City forms and known sound changes in Minamikyūshū.

Overall, Kagoshima and Amami varieties appear more similar to each other when it comes to the overlapping use of the genitive and nominative particles, the use of a topicalized accusative particle (absent in standard Japanese), the use of a purposive particle that is separate from the dative particle, and the use of multiple terminative particles. When it comes to dative, locative, directional and instrumental particles, Kagoshima is more similar to standard Japanese than it is to Amami, as Amami varieties use a number of different particles for these cases. Kagoshima also uses a regular accusative particle like standard Japanese, whereas most Amami varieties do not.

== Index of particles ==
=== A-Z index ===
- bakkai
- batten
- chi
- de (1)
- de (2)
- do
- don
- doma
- ga
- gaa
- gii
- hozu
- i
- ina
- ka (1)
- ka (2)
- kara
- ke (1)
- ke (2)
- mo / n
- mon
- mon ka
- na
- na(n)do
- naa / nee / nii
- no
- o
- (o)ba
- see
- seka
- shiko
- to (1)
- to (2)
- to (3)
- (w)a
- (w)ai / (w)a / i
- yara
- yokka
- yoo
- zui

=== Index by meaning ===
- also
- and / with
- as if
- at / in / to
- because
- but
- emphatic markers
- even
- for example
- from
- just
- more than
- of / 's
- object markers
- question markers
- quote markers
- only
- or
- roughly
- tag markers ("eh?", "right?")
- topic marker ("as for")
- to the extent of
- towards
- until / up to
- with / using

== Syntactic case-marking particles ==
Case-marking particles are short lexical items that attach to the end of nouns, verbs or adjectives and help indicate their grammatical relation within a phrase, clause or sentence.

To illustrate, the following example shows how the word "cat" is explicitly marked to indicate that it is the subject of the transitive verb, while the word "fish" is marked to indicate that it is the object of the verb within the phrase "The cat ate the fish".

Subject		Object		Action
猫	が	魚	を	食いもした
neko	ga	io	o	kuimoshita
cat	Nominative marker	fish	Accusative marker	ate
"The cat ate the fish"

Note that most case-marking particles do not have a direct translation in English, as modern English mostly relies on word order, although it does have some basic subject (aka nominative) and object (aka accusative) marking in personal pronouns such as "he" versus "him".

=== Ablative ===
==== kara ====
Like standard Japanese, the particle から kara is used to indicate a time or place from which something begins. In this sense, it can generally be translated to "from" in English. Regional variants of this particle include かあ kaa and か ka. In the Higashimorokata district of Miyazaki specifically, the form かい kai is used.

ima=kaa
now=ABL
'From now'

Unlike standard Japanese, this particle is not used to mark a reason. Instead, the Kagoshima particle で de is used for that purpose. For example, in the standard Japanese sentence 町から取ってくるものですから machi kara totte kuru mono desu kara "because it was bought from town", the first instance where から kara is used to mean "from" remains unchanged in Kagoshima, while the second, where it's used to mean "because", is replaced by the particle で de:

maʔ=kaa toʔ-ku-n=mon ja-n=de
town=ABL take-come-NPST=NMZ COP=NPST=CNSQ
'Because it was bought from town'

In a few Kagoshima dialects, the particle から kara can be used in two additional ways that are different from standard Japanese.

(1) In the first, it can be used to indicate the means used to arrive to a situation (such as the means of transportation), overlapping with the standard particle で de "by" in this sense. For example:

fune=kara k-ita
boat=ABL come-PST
'(He) came by ship'

basu=kara ik-u=dee
bus=ABL go-NPST=CNSQ
'Since (I) go by bus'

The particle から kara does not replace the other usages of で de "by". For instance, it cannot be used to mark the tool used to achieve an action. So in the sentence "to write with a brush", で de would be used.

(2) In the second, it can be used to mark the agent in an adversative-passive sentence, replacing the standard particle に ni. For example:

in=kara ekake-raru-ta
dog=ABL chase-PAS-PST
'(I) was chased by a dog'

It is worth noting that both usages of から kara in (1) and (2) above may have once been more widespread in Japan, as they were historically attested in Diego Collado's Ars Grammaticae Iaponicae Linguae (Grammar of the Japanese language), published in 1632. Examples of the first taken from his work include fune kara maitta "(he) came by ship" and kachi kara maitta "(he) came on foot" (spellings modernized). An example of the second would be Pedro kara korosareta "(he) was killed by Pedro".

=== Accusative ===
==== o (1) ====
The particle を o is a case particle that marks the direct object in a sentence. Depending on the word that precedes, it can also be pronounced う u.

Like the particles あ a and い i, when を o is added to a word, the final syllable of that word will be subject to resyllabification. For instance, こい koi "this" becomes こよ koyo "this=ACC".

Example:

hon=o yo-n
book=ACC read-NPST
'(I) read a book.'

==== oba and ba ====
The particle をば oba or ば ba marks a topicalized direct object. This form historically derives from a contraction of the accusative marker wo and the topic particle ɸa (modern day wa ~ a). In several Western Kyūshū dialects, ba has completely replaced the particle o as the accusative marker. However, the use of the particle ba within the Kagoshima dialects is restricted mainly to the Koshikijima Islands and is not as widespread elsewhere. Considered an archaism in Standard Japanese, the form oba, pronounced uba in Southern Kagoshima, is more frequently used instead. In contrast with the particle o, oba can be described as an emphatic accusative; that is, it places more emphasis on the direct object.

Examples:

miʔ=o=ba no-nda
water=ACC=TOP drink-PST
'(I) drank water.'

hon=ba yo-n
book=ACC.TOP read-NPST
'(I) read a book.'

=== Comparative ===
==== yokka ====
The particle よっか yokka or its variant よか yoka is used in place of standard Japanese より yori and, like it, it has two main functions. The first is that it can be used to indicate the origin of something, akin to "from" or "beginning from" in English. The second is that it can be used to make comparisons, roughly translating to "more than" or "rather than". In southern Koshikijima and northern Tanegashima, the variant よいか yoika is used, while in northern Koshikijima, the forms よきゃあ yokyaa and ゆうきゃあ yuukyaa are observed. Etymologically, the particle is considered a contraction of より yori and か ka.

nai=yokka
what=COMP
'More than anything'

hana=yokka dango
flower=COMP dumpling
'Dumplings rather than flowers', 'Substance over form'

a-n yama=wa sakurajima=yokka taka=i=ga
that-GEN mountain=TOP sakurajima=COMP tall=ADJ=FP:EPIS
'(I believe that) that mountain is taller than Sakurajima'

=== Dative and locative ===
==== i ====
The dative-locative particle い i (and its variant に ni) can be used to mark a location, a direction, a time, a state, a goal, the recipient of an action, or the agent in a passive sentence. Its usage is very similar to those of the particles に ni "in/at/to" and へ e "to/towards" in standard Japanese. In English, this particle can variously be translated by the prepositions "to", "in", "at", "into", "towards", "by" or "with" depending on the sentence.

Like the particles は a and を o, when い i is added to a word, the final syllable of that word will be subject to resyllabification.

Example of its use to mark a location or direction:

asoko=i ik-an=ka
over_there=DAT go[TR]-NEG=Q
'How about we go over there'

Example of its use to mark the recipient of an action:

ore=i kas-e
1=DAT lend[TR]-IMP
'Lend it to me'

Example of its use to mark a state:

natsu=i nar-yaa
summer=DAT become[INTR]-COND
'Once it becomes summer', 'When summer comes'

==== ina ====
The particle いな ina (or いにゃあ inyaa in northern Koshikijima) generally means "for", "in", "to" or "in order to". Etymologically, it is a combination of the particles い i and は a and is cognate with the standard Japanese construction には ni wa.

ashita=zui=ina
tomorrow=until=DAT.TOP
"By tomorrow"

koko=inyaa sukkome=no uka-tte=o-i
here=DAT.TOP scalpel_sawtail=NOM float-CONJ=PROG-INF
"There are Scalpel Sawtail fish floating (in) here"

=== Genitive and nominative ===
In Old Japanese, the particles が ga and の no had overlapping functions as genitive and nominative markers, and were ultimately distinguished by their degree of politeness. The Kagoshima dialects, like other Western Kyūshū dialects and Ryukyuan varieties, are notable in that this original distinction is largely maintained, although some regional variation in usage occurs.

==== ga ====
In Kagoshima, the particle が ga is considered somewhat more derogatory and occurs mainly with a human subject or possessor.

Examples:

oi=ga e
1=GEN home
'My house', 'my family'

oi=ga tenege
1=GEN handtowel
'My handtowel'

==== no ====
In contrast with the particle が ga, the particle の no (or ん n) is considered more neutral or polite.

sense=no tenege
teacher=GEN handtowel
'The teacher's handtowel'

yama=no taʔ-ka
mountain=NOM high-ADJ
'The mountain is high'

The particle の no is sometimes reduced to ん n.

tsukue=n naka
desk=GEN inside
'inside the desk'

=== Instrumental ===
==== de ====
The instrumental particle で de is used to mark the means or tool used to accomplish an action. It can typically be translated to "with", "by" or "using" in English.

fude=de ka-ita
brush=INSTR write-PST
'(He) wrote with a brush'

mugi=de tsuku-tta
wheat=INSTR make-PST
'It was made with wheat'

From an etymological standpoint, this particle is cognate to the standard Japanese particle で de, broadly meaning "with", "at" or "by". However, it does differ from its standard counterpart in two main ways:

- When indicating the means used to arrive at a situation (similar to the English word "by" in the sentence "he travelled by boat"), most Kagoshima dialects favour the ablative particle から kara instead of で de.
- When marking the location of an action, most Kagoshima dialects favour either the lative particle せえ see "in, at, to" or the dative-locative particle い i "in, at, to, by" instead of で de.

=== Lative ===
==== see ====
The particle せえ see and its many regional variations (e.g. せ se, さい sai, さえ sae, さん san, さね sane, さめ same, さめえ samee, さみゃあ samyaa) marks direction. It can roughly be translated as "in" or "to" in English and is comparable in usage to へ e in standard Japanese. Etymologically, the particle is said to originate from the expression 様に sama ni "by way of, in the state of".

tokyo=see
Tokyo=LAT
'In/to Tokyo'

ibusuʔ=see iʔ=ki-ta
Ibusuki=LAT go=come-PST
'(I) came back from Ibusuki'

shita=see i-ta
down=LAT go-PST
'(I) went down', '(I) went to the bottom'

=== Nominalizing ===
==== to ====
Other than its standard usages, the particle と to is also a nominalizing particle in the Kagoshima dialects. That is, it can be appended to a verb, an adjective or another utterance to transform it into a noun. This usage is similar to how の no is used in standard Japanese.

atai=ga=to
1=GEN=NMZ
'Mine'

koman-ka=to=to futo-ka=to=to
small-ADJ=NMZ=COM big-ADJ=NMZ=COM
'The small one and the big one'

taka=i=to=ga yo-ka
tall=ADJ=NMZ=NOM good-ADJ
'The tall one is good'

The particle と to can also be used at the end of declarative sentences to add mild emphasis.

iʔ=to=yo
go.NPST=EMP=EMP
"I'm going"

==== ta ====
The particle た ta or its variant たあ taa is a combination of the nominalizing particle と to and the topic particle は a. It can be combined with a verb or adjective to turn it into a noun, similar to how ものは mono wa and のは no wa work in standard Japanese.

doi=ke? iʔ.ban koman-ka=to=a.
which=Q? one.number small-ADJ=NOM=TOP.
'Which one? The smallest one.'

=== Purposive ===
==== ke (2) ====
The particle け ke can be used with verbs in their stem form to indicate either the purpose of a movement or the arrival point of a movement. It most often occurs in the construction ～け行っ ~ ke iʔ "to go (do something)". In parts of the Koshikijima islands, the variant きゃあ kyaa is used; in Tanegashima, the variant かあ kaa is used; in parts of the Tokara islands, げえら geera is used; in southern Satsuma, the variant げ ge is used; and amongst older people in the Higashimorokata district of Miyazaki, the variant げ ge is observed. In the nearby Kikai language spoken to the south of Kagoshima, three similar particles are reported: かい kai, がち gachi or かち kachi, and かに kani.

mi=ke i-tta
see=PURP go-PST
'(I) went to look'

io tsur-i=kyaa ik-oo=i
fish angle-INF=PURP go-HORT=EMP
"Let's go fishing!"

Note that this particle can only be used with verbs. With nouns, the particle い i is used instead. For example:

shigoto=i i-tta
work=DAT go-PST
'(I) went to work'

=== Quotative ===
==== to (3) ====
The quotative particle と to is used to mark speech or thought that is being directly quoted (e.g. something someone else said) or indirectly quoted (e.g. paraphrasing what someone else said or indicating hearsay). While both this particle and the particle ち chi largely overlap in usage, the particle と to tends to be favoured with verbs of thought such as 思っ omoʔ "to think".

yakke-na mon ja to omo-ʔ
troublesome-ADJ thing COP QUOT think-NPST
"I think it's quite troublesome"

==== chi ====
The quotative particle ち chi is used to mark speech or thought that is being directly quoted (e.g. something someone else said) or indirectly quoted (e.g. paraphrasing what someone else said or indicating hearsay). While both this particle and the particle と to largely overlap in usage, the particle ち chi tends to be favoured with verbs of speech or communication such as ゆ yu "to say" or 聞っ kiʔ "to hear".

ou izzou chi i-i-ya-tta
hey Izzou QUOT say-INF-POL-PST
"'Hey, Ichizou', he said"

When followed by the verb ゆ yu "to say", it tends to fuse, becoming ちゅう chuu or ちゅ chu instead.

nan chu-eba
what QUOT.say-COND
'If (we) were to say something', 'Relatively speaking'

== Binding particles ==
=== Topic ===
==== (w)a ====
The particle は a or wa is a topic marker. That is, it marks the main thing being talked about in a sentence. Like the particles を o and い i, when は a is added to a word, the final syllable of that word will be subject to resyllabification. For instance, こい koi "this" becomes こや koya "this=TOP" when topicalized.

a-n hito=a sensee jaʔ=do
that-GEN person=TOP teacher is=FP:DECL
'That person is a teacher.'

== Conjunctive particles ==
Conjunctive particles are a category of particles that connect words, phrases or clauses together.

=== Concessive ===
==== batten ("but") ====
The particle ばってん batten is a conjunctive particle meaning "but" or "although". It is less commonly used than どん don. In the peripheral islands of Tanegashima, Yakushima and Tokara, the variants ばって batte and ばっちぇ batche are also used alongside ばってん batten.

==== don ("but") ====
The particle どん don is a conjunctive particle meaning "but" or "although" and typically follows a declarative verb.

From an etymological standpoint, while the particle どん don is technically cognate with the standard Japanese particle ども domo "even though", it may be more accurate to say that it stems from a reduction of the standard expression けれども keredomo "but" which carries the same meaning. This is supported by the fact that, in neighboring provinces such as Miyazaki (including the Higashimorokata district), the form けんどん kendon is used, which can be further shortened to けん ken (as opposed to どん don like in Kagoshima).

ima i-ta=don zusu ja-tta.
now go-PST=although out COP-PST
"I just went, but no one was home."

=== Consequential ===
==== de ("because") ====
The particle で de (sometimes でえ dee in northern Koshikijima) can be combined with verbs or adjectives to mean "because". It is used in place of the standard Japanese particles から kara or ので node.

kyu=wa teso-ka=de mō ik-an.
today=TOP tired-ADJ=CNSQ anymore go-NEG
"I won't be going anymore because I'm too tired today."

ame=ga fu-tte=oʔ=de
rain=NOM fall=CONJ=PROG=CNSQ
'Because it is raining'

=== Coordinating ===
Coordinating particles (sometimes called connective particles or parallel markers) are particles used to link more than one noun or nominalized phrase together. They generally cover the meanings of "and" and "or".

==== to ("and, with") ====
The conjunctive or comitative particle と to generally serves to coordinate nouns or noun phrases and can be translated to "and", "with" or "together with" in English. This particle is the same in both pronunciation and usage as standard Japanese.

sego-don=to tsugo-don
sego-HON=COM tsugo-HON=CONJ
'Mr. Sego and Mr. Tsugo'

dai=to kjooto=i it-ta=kaa
who=COM Kyōto=DAT go-PST=Q
'Who did you go to Kyōto with?'

Note that verbs and adjectives are coordinated using verbal suffixes instead of this particle. See Kagoshima verb conjugations: Te form for details.

==== yara ("and") ====
The conjunctive particle やら yara is used to coordinate nouns and signal that the list is incomplete. In this sense, it can translated to "A, B and C (amongst other things)" or "A, B, C, etc.". The particle is equivalent in usage to the standard Japanese particle や ya.

kan=yara sun=yara fude=yara moro-ta
paper=CONJ ink=CONJ brush=CONJ receive-PST
'I received paper, ink and a brush (amongst other things)'

==== ka ("or") ====
The disjunctive particle か ka serves to coordinate nouns or noun phrases and can be translated to "or" in English. This particle is the same in both pronunciation and usage as standard Japanese.

== Adverbial particles ==
Adverbial particles are a broad category of particles that attach to the end of nouns or phrases (such as noun phrases and verb phrases) and "express such meanings as restriction, exemplification or similarity", amongst others.

=== Approximation ===
==== doma ("roughly") ====
The particle どま doma typically follows nouns and marks approximation. It can be translated as "roughly", "approximately", "just about", "around" or "or so" in English. The closest standard Japanese equivalents would be ばかりは bakari wa, ぐらいは gurai wa and などは nado wa.

Etymologically, どま doma stems from the word 共 tomo, meaning "together with" in standard Japanese, and the topic particle は (w)a.

go nin doma
five people roughly
'Roughly five people'

so=gen kattakutta kan doma iran.
this=like scribble.PST paper roughly want.NEG
'I do not want scribbled paper like this'

=== Exemplification ===
==== nando or nado ("for example") ====
The particle of exemplification なんど nando and its variant など nado roughly translates to "for example" or "such as" in English.

=== Focus ===
==== mo or n ("also") ====
The focus particle も mo and its variant ん n marks inclusion or similarity and roughly translates to "also", "too" or "as well" in English.

aa oi=mo sogan shi-te-ka-naa
oh 1=also that_kind_of do-CONJ-AUX:in_advance-NEG
'Oh, I will also have to do that'

==== seka ("even") ====
The focus particle せか seka (or さあか saaka in northern Koshikijima) expresses an extreme example and roughly translates to "even", "(if) only" or "as long as" in English. The particle is usually followed by a verb in the conditional form. From a usage perspective, this particle is equivalent to the standard Japanese particle さえ sae "even", to which it is related.

Example from Koshikijima:

kuruma=saaka mo=tte=o=reba
car=even have=CONJ=PROG=COND
'As long as you have a car'

=== Restriction ===
==== bakkai ("just") ====
The restrictive particle ばっかい bakkai, roughly translating to "just", is functionally the same as standard Japanese ばかり bakari (colloquially ばっかり bakkari).

me-niʔ ame=bakkai fu-tte=oʔ=do.
every-day rain=just fall-CONJ=PROG=EMP
"It's just raining every day"

==== hozu ("to the extent of") ====
The restrictive particle ほず hozu is used to show the extent to which the following verb or adjective applies to what precedes. In English, it can be roughly translated with the expressions "to the extent of", "as (much) as" or "so (...) that". This particle is cognate with the standard Japanese particle ほど hodo and is largely limited to the Higashimorokata district of Miyazaki. In Kagoshima, the particle しこ shiko is used instead.

==== shiko ("to the extent of") ====
The restrictive particle しこ shiko (sometimes pronounced ひこ hiko) is used to show the extent to which the following verb or adjective applies to what precedes. In English, it can be roughly translated with the expressions "to the extent of", "as (much) as" or "so (...) that". The particle しこ shiko is used in place of standard Japanese だけ dake or ほど hodo. Etymologically, しこ shiko may be related to standard Japanese しき shiki, found in compounds like これしき koreshiki "only this much", as well as しか shika "only", which is limited in standard Japanese to negative phrases.

do=shiko de=n
what=extent is=however
'As many as one likes'

atta=shiko moʔ=ke
have.PST=extent bring=come.IMP
'Bring all that you have'

=== Terminative (or limitative) ===
==== gii ("until, up to") ====
The terminative particle ぎい gii or its variant ぎ gi is used to indicate a time or place as a limit and can be translated as "until" or "up to" in English. It is functionally similar to the particle まで made in Japanese.

Etymologically, the particle originated from the noun 切り kiri meaning "end" or "bound" (rendaku form: ぎり giri), possibly by way of shortening the term 限り kagiri "limit, as far as, as much as". The noun 切り kiri also gave way to the standard Japanese particle きり kiri (ぎり giri), meaning "just" or "only". To the south of Kagoshima, similar terminative particles are attested in Northern Ryukyuan varieties, such as がり gari in Kikai and がでぃ gadi in Okinoerabu. However, it is unclear if these are related.

go ji=gi
five hour=TERM
"Until 5 o'clock"

hai koi=gii=yo
yes this=TERM=EMP
'Yes, so far'

ittoʔ, kagomma=gii itakkuʔ=de
hold_on kagoshima=TERM go_and_return=CNSQ
"It's because I'm going to Kagoshima and back"

==== made ("until, up to") ====
Just like in standard Japanese, the terminative particle まで made is used to indicate a time or place as a limit and can be translated as "until" or "up to" in English. In the Nakatane dialect of Tanegashima, the form まじぇ maje is used, while in the Taira dialect of Koshijijima, the form みゃー myaa is used.

atcha=myaa ik-e
over_there=TERM go-IMP
'Go over there.'

==== zui ("until, up to") ====
The terminative particle ずい zui (also spelled づい dzui) is used to indicate a time or place as a limit and can be translated as "to", "until" or "up to" in English. It is functionally equivalent to the particle まで made "to, up to, until", used in both standard Japanese and the local Kagoshima dialects. In the Higashimorokata district of Miyazaki, the form ずり zuri is used, while in the town of Ei, Kagoshima (now Minamikyūshū), the form ぢゅい djui is used.

Etymologically, the particle ずい zui likely originates from the noun 出り "setting out (to)", which was historically pronounced dzuri in Kagoshima and would be cognate with the form 出 de "coming out" in modern standard Japanese. This is evidenced by the fact that the verb 出る "to go out; to exit; to set out" and its nominal form are still pronounced ずい zui or dzui in the traditional Kagoshima dialects. The oldest attestation of this particle is found in the 18th-century works of Gonza under the form ドゥイ dui ~ dwi (possibly pronounced [d͡zui] or [d͡zwi] at the time), as in モスクゥィドゥイ moskwi dui/dwi "up to Moscow".

iʔ=zui
when=TERM
'Until when?'

doko=zui
where=TERM
'Up to where?', 'How far?'

ichiki=kara ichihino=dzui
ichiki=ABL ichihino=TERM
'From Ichiki to Ichihino'

In Koshikijima, ずい zui can also be used in the sense of "even" or "so far as":

tai=zui koo-da
sea_bream=TERM eat-PST
'(I) even ate sea bream', '(I) went so far as eating sea bream'

== Sentence-final particles ==
Sentence-final particles, sometimes called sentence-ending particles or interactional particles, are uninflected lexical items that appear at the end of a phrase or sentence. Unlike other types of particles such as case particles or conjunctive particles, sentence-final particles do not indicate the grammatical relation of different elements in a clause. Instead, they can be described as indicating "the illocutionary force of the proposition as well as the speaker's attitude towards the proposition and/or the interloculor(s)". This means that, among other things, sentence-final particles can be used to indicate how true the speaker believes the utterance is (e.g. definitely true, probably true, hearsay, personal opinion, etc.), to express the speaker's personal feelings towards the utterance (e.g. admiration, shock, etc.), or to solicit a reaction from the listener. They can also vary based on the speaker's relation with the listener and the degree of politeness they wish to express.

=== Modality markers ===
==== (w)ai, (w)a and i ====
The particle あい ai or more rarely わい wai is a sentence-final particle used to bring awareness to something and to indicate that the speaker is expressing their own view. Unlike other sentence-final particles, this particle attaches to the preceding word (typically a verb in its non-past form) and fuses with the vowel of the final syllable of that word. Functionally, this particle is similar in usage to the particle よ yo in standard Japanese. In the Koshikijima islands, the variants あ a and わ wa are used.

Etymologically, the particle is said to originate from the historical pronoun 我 ware "I" and to be cognate with the sentence-ending particles わ wa, わい wai and ばい bai used dialectally throughout Japan.

kattsuke=o wasure-ta=ai
document=ACC forget-PST=FP
"(I) forgot the documents"

anna=i kuima ya-ru=ai
dangerous=ADJ car COP-NPST=FP
"It's a dangerous car"

soi=mo yo-ka=ai=ne
that=also good-ADJ=FP=EMP
"That is also good"

dora hi=ga her-an uchi=i modo-i-mos-o=wai
whatever sun=NOM decrease-CONJC home=DAT return-INF-POL-VOL=FP
"Whatever the case, let's return before the sun goes down"

ke-tte=o-ru=a
kick-SEQ=PROG-NPST=FP
"(I am) kicking"

After a verb in its volitional form (also called the presumptive form), the particle is reduced to い i and serves to add insistence to what is being said. Examples from Izumi, Kagoshima include 飲もい nomoi "let's drink", 行こい ikoi "let's go", 見ろい miroi "let's see" and しゅい shui "let's do (it)".

==== do ====
The sentence-final particle ど do, sometimes lengthened to どお・どー doo, is used to mark an assertion and to grab the attention of the addressee, if one is present. It is functionally similar to the particles よ yo and ぞ zo in standard Japanese as well as the particle どー doo used in most Ryukyuan languages such as Okinawan.

yo-ka=do
good-ADJ=FP:DECL
"It's good!"

kae-ro=do
return-VOL=FP:DECL
"I'm going home!"

kyu=wa yo-ka tenki jaʔ=do
today=TOP good-ADJ weather is=FP:DECL
'The weather is quite fine today!'

nnma-ka-tta=doo
delicious-ADJ-PST=FP:DECL
"It was delicious!"

Note that when this particle follows the polite auxiliary verb もんす monsu, the final -su gets dropped. For example, 行っもんど iʔ-mon do "(I'm) going!" (instead of *iʔ-monsu do).

==== gaa ====
The sentence-final particle があ gaa or sometimes just が ga is used to mark a statement that the speaker believes to be true. In English, it can be overtly translated as "I believe (that)" or "I think (that)", whereas in standard Japanese, there is no direct equivalent to this particle, so it is often translated with the tag-marker ね ne "eh?" or "right?", with the declarative modal particle よ yo or with the modal auxiliary of probability だろう darou.

yassen=gaa
hopeless=FP:EPIS
"(I believe that) it's hopeless"

kodomo=a asko=i oo=gaa
children=TOP there=DAT be=FP:EPIS
"(I believe that) the children are over there",
"The children should be over there."

issho=ni i-ku=ga
together=DAT go-NPST=FP:EPIS
"(I believe that) we should go together"

ku=ga
eat.NPST=FP:EPIS
"(I believe that) we should eat"

==== mon ====
As a regular noun, もん (物) mon means "thing" and often follows verbs in their nominal form or stem form to create a compound noun. For example, 食い物 kuimon "food" is a compound of 食い kui "eating" and 物 mon "thing".

This word can also be used at the end of a sentence, where it functionally acts like both a nominalizer and a sentence-final particle marking a cheeky comment, sometimes translated as "you know" in English. When used as such, it is always written in kana as もん mon. In regards to its usage, the particle もん mon typically follows adjectives and verbs directly and is often also followed by the copula じゃ ja "is".

oyaʔ=ga he=wa makoto=i kusa=i=mon ja
father=GEN fart=TOP truly=DAT smell=ADJ=FP:NMZ:you_know COP
"My dad's farts are truly smelly!"

makoto=i yazeroshi=i=mon ja
truly=DAT annoy=ADJ=FP:NMZ:you_know COP
"You're so annoying you know!"

==== mon ka ====
The compound particle もんか mon ka (pronounced むんか mun ka in the southern Satsuma Peninsula) typically follows a declarative verb and serves to both nominalize the phrase and to repudiate or dismiss the idea brought forth. In this sense, it can be overtly translated as "as if (I would)" or "there's no way (I could)". It can also simply be translated in English with negation, e.g. "(I) will not".

Functionally, this compound particle is the same as standard Japanese もんか mon ka, and ultimately derives from a combination of the sentence-final particle もん mon and the question particle か ka.

gattsu=i ku-u=ga na-i=munka
really=DAT eat-NPST=NOM be_able-NPST=FP:NMZ:as_if
"As if I could really eat them!", "There's no way I would truly be able to eat them!"

==== naa, nee and nii ====
The sentence-final particles なあ / なー / な na(a), ねえ / ねー / ね ne(e) and にい / にー nii (used chiefly in Minamikyūshū) are used to indicate or solicit acknowledgement, agreement or confirmation regarding non-controversial information. In English, these particles are typically translated using tag question markers such as "eh?", "right?", "isn't it?" or "aren't you?" because of their use in utterances where the speaker is looking for agreement or confirmation from the listener. That said, they also play a role in narration where they help indicate that the statement uttered is incomplete and is the basis for what will be said next, and that the speaker may or may not be seeking acknowledgement from the listener (through backchannel responses).

Etymologically, these particles are all cognate with the standard Japanese particle ね ne and its variant な na, common in most Western Japanese dialects.

nnma-ka-tta=do=nee
delicious-ADJ-PST=FP:DECL=Q
"It was delicious, don't you agree?"

i-ʔ=ga=nii
go-NPST=FP:EPIS=Q
'We should go, right?'

ja-ru=ai=nii
COP-NPST=EMP=Q
"Right?", "It is, isn't it?"

A study on sentence-final particles in the Sato dialect of Koshikijima found that, while な(ー) na(a) and ね(ー) ne(e) mostly overlapped in usage, speakers felt that the particle ne(e) was not native to their dialect and was instead an artifact of standard Japanese. The same study confirmed that the usage of ne(e) was very similar to that of the particle ne in standard Japanese and that some minor differences with the native particle na(a) existed. One such difference is that ne(e) tends to only be used when speakers mix in standard Japanese grammar. Another is that it is not used when talking to oneself (e.g. it would not be used when thinking to oneself "*that flower is so pretty"), whereas the native particle na(a) can be.

==== o ====
The particle お o or おー oo (sometimes written を and をー respectively) is a sentence-final particle used to stress the utterance. It tends to follow declarative or imperative statements and is similar in usage to the particles よ yo and わ wa in standard Japanese.

Etymologically, it is likely that this particle is a holdover from Old and Middle Japanese and that it has the same origins as the accusative case particle を o, which is used to mark the direct object in a sentence. In Old Japanese, the particle を started as an exclamatory particle expressing consent and response and was sometimes used in sentence-final position as an interjectional particle used to mark admiration in a declarative phrase or to add strength to an imperative phrase.

haya=u i-ki=ya-i oo
fast=ADV go-INF=do.aux.POL-IMP EMP
'Please go quickly'

yo-ka tenki ja na o
good-ADJ weather COP EMP EMP
'The weather is quite nice'

no-mi=ya-n-se o
drink-INF=do.aux.POL-HON-IMP EMP
'Please drink'

In Tanegashima, this particle fuses with the preceding word. For example, the phrase 良かお yoka o "it's good" would become 良こー yokoo.

==== yoo ====
The sentence-final particle よー yoo or sometimes just よ yo is used mark an assertion and to grab the attention of the addressee, if one is present. Etymologically, it is cognate with the standard Japanese particle よ yo.

ima okir-an=to, gakkou=ni okuru-i=yo
now get_up-NEG=COND, school=DAT be_late[INTR]-NPST=FP:DECL
"If you don't get up now, you'll be late for school."

A study on sentence-final particles in the Sato dialect of Koshikijima found that, while よ(ー) yo(o) and ど(ー) do(o) mostly overlapped in usage, speakers felt that the particle yo(o) was not native to their dialect and was instead an artifact of standard Japanese. The study, however, was not able to validate this claim as speakers did not tend to mix in standard Japanese grammar when the particle was used (unlike the particle ね(ー) ne(e)). The study only found one salient difference between the two particles which was that speakers did not use yo(o) when speaking or thinking to themselves, preferring do(o) instead.

=== Question markers ===
==== ka ====
Like standard Japanese, the sentence-final particle か ka (pronounced が ga in Makurazaki city) is used to mark a question at the end of a phrase. Compared to the question particles け ke and な na, the particle か ka is neutral and can be used with anyone regardless of age.

nan gaʔ=ka
what month=Q
'What month?'

do ya-tta-ro=ga
how COP-PST-INFER=Q
'How was it?'

==== ke (1) ====
The sentence-final particle け ke or sometimes けえ kee (pronounced げ ge and げえ gee in Makurazaki city) is used to mark a question at the end of a phrase. While this particle is functionally equivalent to the question particle か ka, it is more specifically used when talking to someone who is younger.

doi=ke? iʔ-ban koman-ka=to=a.
which=Q? one-number small-ADJ=NMZ=TOP.
'Which one? The smallest one.'

ashita yasumi=kee?
tomorrow holiday=Q?
'Is tomorrow a holiday?'

modo-ʔ=ki-ta=ge?
return-SEQ=come-PST=Q
'Have (they) come back?'

==== na ====
The sentence-final particle な na is used to mark a question at the end of a phrase. While this particle is functionally equivalent to the question particle か ka, it is more specifically used when talking to someone who is older.

modo-tte ki-ta=mon ja-naga=do=na
return-SEQ come-PST=NMLZ COP-NEG=EMP=Q
'Is it not the case that the person came back?'

== See also ==
Particles used in other Japonic varieties:

- Particles in Early Middle Japanese
  - Particles in standard Japanese (see also: full list of particles)
  - Particles in Kansai dialects
  - Particles in the Nagasaki dialect
- Particles in Hachijō
- Particles in Okinawan

Particles used in other languages of East Asia:

- Particles in Chinese
- Particles in Korean
- Particles in Jeju
- Particles in Manchu
