= Japanese particles =

Particles in Japanese

Japanese particles, joshi (助詞) (Note: Literally "helping words" or "auxiliary words". This term originally referred to "particles", "auxiliary verbs" and "suffixes" in Japanese, the latter two are now respectively termed jodōshi (助動詞) and setsubigo (接尾語). It was also used for "auxiliary verbs" (助動詞, jodōshi) in some European grammars.) or teni(o)ha (てに（を）は), are suffixes or short words in Japanese grammar that immediately follow the modified noun, verb, adjective, or sentence. Their grammatical range can indicate various meanings and functions, such as speaker affect and assertiveness.

== Orthography and diction ==
Japanese particles are written in hiragana in modern Japanese, though some of them also have kanji forms: (弖 or 天 for te て; 爾 for ni に; 乎 or 遠 for o を; and 波 for wa は). Particles follow the same rules of phonetic transcription as all Japanese words, with the exception of は (written ha, pronounced wa as a particle), へ (written he, pronounced e) and を (written using a hiragana character with no other use in modern Japanese, originally assigned as wo, now usually pronounced o, though some speakers render it as wo). These exceptions are a relic of historical kana usage.

== Types of particles ==
There are eight types of particles, depending on what function they serve.

=== Case markers (格助詞, kakujoshi) ===
が, の, を, に, へ, と, で, から, より
ga, no, o, (Note: The particles pronounced o, e, and wa are written with the hiragana を (wo), へ (he), and は (ha). See Orthography and diction above.) ni, e, to, de, kara, yori

=== Parallel markers (並立助詞, heiritsu-joshi) ===
か, の, や, に, と, やら, なり, だの
ka, no, ya, ni, to, yara, nari, dano

=== Sentence ending particles (終助詞, shūjoshi) ===
か, の, や, な, わ, とも, かしら
ka, no, ya, na, wa, tomo, kashira

=== Interjectory particles (間投助詞, kantō-joshi) ===
さ, よ, ね
sa, yo, ne

=== Adverbial particles (副助詞, fukujoshi) ===
ばかり, まで, だけ, ほど, くらい, など, なり, やら
bakari, made, dake, hodo, kurai, nado, nari, yara

=== Binding particles (係助詞, kakarijoshi, keijoshi) ===
は, も, こそ, でも, しか, さえ, だに
wa, mo, koso, demo, shika, sae, dani

=== Conjunctive particles (接続助詞, setsuzoku-joshi) ===
ば, や, が, て, のに, ので, から, ところが, けれども, くせに
ba, ya, ga, te, noni, node, kara, tokoroga, keredomo, kuseni

=== Phrasal particles (準体助詞, juntai-joshi) ===
の, から
no, kara

Note that some particles appear in two types. For example, kara is called a "case marker" where it describes where something is from or what happens after something; when it describes a cause it is called a "conjunctive particle".

== List of particles ==
=== Index ===
- bakari
- bakari ka
- bakashi
- dake
- da no
- de
- de mo
- dokoro ka
- e
- ga
- hodo
- ka
- kai
- ka na
- kara
- ka shira
- kedo
- kiri
- kke
- koro/goro
- koso
- kurai/gurai
- made
- made ni
- me
- mo
- mono/mon
- mono de
- mono ka/mon-ka
- mono nara
- mono o
- na and naa
- nado
- nanka/nante
- nara
- ne
- ni
- ni te
- ni wa
- no
- no de
- nomi
- no ni
- o
- sa/saa
- sae
- de sae
- sae...ba/ra
- shi
- shika
- sura
- to
- to ka
- to mo
- tte
- tteba
- wa
- ya
- yara
- yo
- yori
- ze
- zo
- zutsu

=== Meaning and usage ===
Preceding syntactic element	Example sentence	Translation
bakari ばかり (許り)	Translates to: "just, only, full of" Colloquially: ばっかり bakkari, ばっか bakka	
Noun	Tōkyō wa hito bakari da. 東京は人ばかりだ。	Tokyo is just full of people.
Verbs (ta form)	Tabeta bakari da. 食べたばかりだ。	I just ate.
Verb (te form)	Kare wa tabete bakari iru. 彼は食べてばかりいる。	He's always eating.
bakari ka ばかりか (許りか)	Translates to: "not only". Accompanied by さえ sae ("but also") indicates something unusual or unexpected. Etymology: bakari + ka	
Nouns	Sofu bakari ka, sōsofu sae ikite iru. 祖父ばかりか、曽祖父さえ生きている。	Not only is my grandfather living, but so is my great-grandfather.
bakashi ばかし (許し)	bakashi is another form of bakari.	
dake だけ (丈)	Translates to: "only"; limit. Dake functions as a noun. Kanji form 丈 is less commonly used.	
Nouns	rōmaji dake no jisho ローマ字だけの辞書	a rōmaji-only dictionary
Verbs (volitional)	Netai dake nereba ii. 寝たいだけ寝ればいい。	You can sleep as much as you want [to sleep].
da no だの	Translates to: "and, things like". Etymology: da (copula) + no. This particle is used far less frequently than to ka. Often has negative connotations.	
Nouns, adjectives, verbs	Nattō da no, shīfūdo da no, wasabi da no—nihonshoku ga nigate da. 納豆だの、シーフードだの、わさびだの—日本食が苦手だ。	Natto, seafood, wasabi—Japanese food isn't my thing.
de で	Etymology: Originally an alteration of ni te, later treated as a conjugation of the copula da. de can be used as "at" or "by". When serving as the continuative TE form of a subordinate clause, de substitutes for da/desu, carries the meaning "is, and so...", and takes on the tense of the final verb of the sentence.	
Nouns: instrument	Jitensha de ikimashō. 自転車で行きましょう。	Let's go by bicycle.
Nouns: location	Koko de yasumitai. ここで休みたい。	I want to rest here.
Nouns: language	Nihongo de tegami o kaita. 日本語で手紙を書いた。	I wrote the letter in Japanese.
TE form of copula: "is, and so..."	kimi ga suki de yokatta 君 が 好き で よかった。	You are loved (and so) I am glad. / I am glad that I love you.
de mo でも	Translates to: "even; or; but, however; also in" Etymology: de + mo	
Nouns, particles: "even"	Uchū kara de mo Banri-no-Chōjō ga mieru. 宇宙からでも万里の長城が見える。	Even from space you can see the Great Wall of China.
Noun: "or something"	Ocha de mo, ikaga? お茶でも、いかが？	Would you like tea or something?
Noun: "also in"	Nihon de mo eigo o benkyō suru 日本でも英語を勉強する。	In Japan also, we study English.
Beginning of phrase: "but, however, even so"	De mo, watashi wa sō omowanai でも、私はそう思わない。	But I don't think so.
dokoro ka どころか (所か)	Translates to: "anything but, far from" Etymology: dokoro (tokoro: place) + ka	
Nouns	Kare wa keisatsukan dokoro ka, hanzaisha da. 彼は警察官どころか、犯罪者だ。	He's anything but a policeman; he's a criminal.
e へ	Translates to: "to, in"; direction In the current convention, it is spelt with the historical kana spelling へ, despite its modern pronunciation, although it was occasionally spelt え before spelling standardization.	
Nouns: direction	Nihon e yōkoso! 日本へようこそ！	Welcome to Japan!
ga が	Functions as: identifier (identifies something unspecified), conjunction ("but"). Not to be confused with the particle は. Ga (が or ヶ): Historical possessive used to connect nouns, most often seen in place names as ヶ	
Nouns: Subject Marker (answers a silent or asked question)	Neko ga esa o tabeta. 猫が餌を食べた。	The cat ate the catfood. [Answers: "What ate the catfood?"]
Nouns: Subject Marker (answers a silent or asked question)	Inu ga suki. 犬が好き。	I like dogs. [Answers: What do you like?]
Noun: noun connector	wa ga kuni 我が国	my/our [collective] country
Noun: noun connector	Fujimi ga Oka 富士見が丘	Fuji View Hill
Noun: noun connector	Seki ga hara 関が原	Gateway Plains (site of the Battle of Sekigahara)
Phrases: conjunction (but...)	Inu wa suki da ga, neko wa kirai da. 犬は好きだが、猫は嫌いだ。	I like dogs but I hate cats.
hodo ほど (程)	Translates to: "as much as"; upper limit	
Nouns	Kare hodo nihongo ga umakunai. 彼ほど日本語がうまくない。	My Japanese isn't as good as his.
Adjectives^{*}	Hayai hodo ii. 早いほどいい。	The sooner, the better.
Verb	Aitsu o koroshitai hodo kirai da. あいつを殺したいほど嫌いだ。	I hate him enough to want to kill him.
i い	A reduced form of ne, yo or ya. It can follow imperative forms. In most modern dialects, it was fused permanently to the once free imperative form ko (来) to form koi (来い; come!). It is still prevalent in western dialects' imperative forms where yo would be used in standard Japanese, such as okii (起きい) and akei/akee (開けい・開けえ). See ka i and Japanese conjugation § Imperative: Conjugation table.	
ka か	Functions as: question denominator, alternative item conjunction, quotation expressing doubt; "whether", especially when used with dō ka ("or not").	
Nouns, verbs: listing alternatives	Kore ka, sore ka, dotchika erande yo. これか、それか、どっちか選んでよ。	This or that, choose one of them.
Noun, verbs: "whether (or not)"	Iku ka [dō ka] wakaranai. 行くか（どうか）分からない。	I don't know [whether or not / if] he'll go.
Adverbs (interrogative): uncertainty	Dokoka de mita koto ga aru. どこかで見たことがある。	I think I've seen you somewhere before. (You look familiar)
Phrases: question (formal)	Wakarimasu ka? 分かりますか？	Do you understand? (formal)
Phrases: question, rhetorical	Eigo nante wakarimasu ka! 英語なんて分かりますか!	Why the heck would I understand English? (formal)
Phrases: question, invitation	Sate, dekake yō ka? さて、出かけようか？	Right then, shall we leave?
Phrase: quotation expressing doubt	Iku ka to omoimasu ga... 行くかと思いますが⋯。	I think he'll go (but I'm not sure)...
kai かい	Ka i is a gentler and masculine variant of the question marker ka. The i could be a reduction of ne or yo.	
ka na かな	Translates to: "I wonder" (Note: "Ka na" implies having mostly made up one's mind. Drawing out the "na" [ka naa] implies less certainty.) Etymology: ka + na	
Phrases	Kare wa ayashii hito ka na. 彼は怪しい人かな。	I wonder if he's a suspicious person.
kara から	Translates to: "from, after, because" Kara may be followed by no to link two nouns.	
Nouns: "from, out of"	Tōkyō kara kaetta. 東京から帰った。	He returned from Tokyo.
Nouns: "from, out of"	zutto mae kara no hanashi ずっと前からの話	a conversation from way back
Verb (te form): "after"	Owatte kara, kite kudasai. 終わってから、来てください。	Please come by after finishing (after you've finished).
Adjectives, Verbs: "because"	Niku o tabenai kara, raamen wa dame da 肉を食べないから、ラーメンはだめだ。	Because he doesn't eat meat, ramen is bad (a bad idea).
ka shira かしら	Ka shira is like ka na, but is used more by women. See also Gender differences in spoken Japanese. Etymology: ka + shira, the irrealis form (i.e. negative form minus the -nai) of shiru "to know"	
Phrases	Kare wa ayashii hito ka shira. 彼は怪しい人かしら。	I wonder if he's a suspicious person.
kedo けど	Translates to: "although, but" Etymology: kedo is a shortened version of formal keredomo. It also appears semi-abbreviated and semi-formally as keredo or kedomo.	
Adjectives, verbs	Kanojo wa hen da kedo kirei da. 彼女は変だけどきれいだ。	She is strange but pretty
kiri きり (切り)	Translates to: "just, only" Kiri is more rarely used than dake, functions as a noun and may be followed by no.	
Nouns	futari kiri no o-mise 二人きりのお店	a shop with just two people [who work there]
kke っけ	Translates to: "Similar to ka but in an attempt to recall forgotten information." Etymology: kke originates from the auxiliary verb of Old Japanese "keri".	
Nouns	Nani wo iou to shitetan da kke 何を言おうとしてたんだっけ	What were you trying to say, again?
koro/goro ごろ (頃)	Translates to: "around, about, approximately" Koro functions as a noun and may be followed by no.	
Nouns	San-ji goro ni aimashō. 三時ごろに会いましょう。	Let's meet around 3 o'clock.
koso こそ	Functions as: Emphasis marker. There is no direct translation, but roughly analogous to "precisely" or "exactly", as in examples below.	
Phrases	Kyō koso, yaru zo! 今日こそ、やるぞ！	Today, I'm going to do it!
Phrases	Kimi ga suki da kara koso kore dake ganbatte iru n da yo. 君が好きだからこそこれだけがんばっているんだよ。	It's precisely because I like you that I'm working this hard.
Phrases	Kochira koso, yoroshiku onegai shimasu. こちらこそ、よろしくお願いします。	Nice to meet you, too. (Emphasizes this side or me too)
kurai/gurai くらい・ぐらい (位)	Translates to: "about, approximately" Kurai functions as a noun and may be followed by no.	
Nouns	Juppun kurai kakaru 十分くらいかかる。	It takes about 10 minutes.
made まで (迄)	Translates to: "up to, until, as far as" Indicates a time or place as a limit.	
Nouns (specifically places or times)	Kono densha wa, Shimonoseki made ikimasu. この電車は、下関まで行きます。	This train goes as far as Shimonoseki.
Verb	Kaeru made matte ru. 帰るまで待ってる。	I'll wait until you come home.
made ni までに (迄に)	Translates to: "by (a certain time)" Etymology: made + ni	
Nouns, verbs	Ku-ji made ni kaeru. 九時までに帰る。	I'll come back by nine o'clock.
me め (目)	me (目 only): ordinal particle me (め only): "Damn..."; abusive/pejorative	
Classifier nouns: ordinal	Amerika wa nikai me desu. アメリカは二回目です。	This is my second time to America.
Noun: abusive "damn..."	Orokamono me! 愚か者め！	[You] damn fool!
mo も	Translates to: "also" Mo always replaces wa and ga, but may follow other particles. When Mo follows a counter word, it can be roughly translated to "as much as" to emphasize amounts.	
Nouns, phrases	Watashi ni mo kureta. 私にもくれた。	I was given (something), too.
mono/mon もの・もん	Verb + mono (物) : creates a noun from the verb (only applies to certain verbs) もの/もん at the end of a sentence: casual feminine sentence ender like の; もん is very feminine and a bit cheeky.	
With verbs	Nomimono 飲み物	Drink
With verbs	Tabemono 食べ物	Food
With verbs	Ikimono 生き物	Living thing
At the end of a sentence	"Doushite konakatta no?" "Jugyō ga attanda mono." 「どうしてこなかったの？」「授業があったんだもの。」	"Why didn't you come?" "I had class."
At the end of a sentence	"Doushite konakatta no?" "Jugyō ga attanda mon." 「どうしてこなかったの？」「授業があったんだもん。」	"Why didn't you come?" "I had class, hah."
mono de もので	Similar meaning as ので.	
mono ka/mon-ka ものか/もんか	Put at the end of sentences to strongly decline. (More gently : もの/もんですか)	
At the end of sentences	Makeru-monka! 負けるもんか!	I will not surrender!
At the end of sentences	Dare ga anna tokoro-ni nido to iku-mondesuka! 誰があんなところに二度と行くもんですか!	Who would dare to go to a place like that for a second time!?
mono nara ものなら (物なら)	if (I/we/etc.) could	
mono o ものを	Used in phrases to show deplore feelings about not doing something they should do.	
Phrases	"Sukida" to hito koto itte kure-sae shi-tara kekkon deki-ta mono o... "好きだ"と一言言ってくれさえしたら、結婚できたものを...	If you had said "I like you", we would have gotten married...
na and naa な(and なる)・なあ・なぁ	Na (な only): used with a class of adjectives which behave grammatically like nouns (see na-adjectives). A more archaic form of this na is naru (なる), which is used in the same way. If na follows a dictionary form verb, it is a negative command ("Don't... "). However, if used with a verb stem, it implies the opposite: "Do..." as a short form of nasai (なさい). It is also used to modify general nouns before other particles which cannot directly follow nouns (e.g. no de). Etymology: The na used with nouns (including na-adjectives) is a form of the copula. Na or naa at the end of a sentence is a variant of ne, implying more reflection.	
Verb (plain non-future)	Suru-na するな	Don't do (something).
Verb (stem)	Tabe-na 食べな (short form of 食べなさい)	Do eat / Please eat.
Na-adjectives	hen na hito 変な人	a strange person
Phrases	Hen da na! 変だな！	How strange!
nado など (等)	Translates to: "for example, things like, such as, etc., and so on" Functions as a noun and may be followed by no.	
Nouns	Nattō ya kabuki nado wa Nihon dake ni aru. 納豆や歌舞伎などは日本だけにある。	Things like natto and kabuki are only in Japan.
nanka/nante なんか・なんて (何か・何て)	Functions to: emphasize disgust, contempt, or otherwise negative feelings of the speaker. Nante is slightly more formal than nanka.	
Nouns	Jogen nanka iranai. 助言なんかいらない。	I don't need any (damn) advice.
Verb	Oyogu nante dekinai. 泳ぐなんてできない。	I can't swim.
Adjectives	Ōkiku nanka nai kedo, kirei da. 大きくなんかないけど、きれいだ。	It's not big [or anything], but it's clean.
nara なら	Translates to: "if"; conditional Hypothetical (仮定形) or conditional form of the copula da. Related to the more formal naraba.	
Nouns, adjectives, verbs, phrases	Atsui nara, eakon o tsukete 暑いなら、エアコンを付けて。	If you're hot, turn on the air conditioner.
ne ね	Translates to: "eh"; interjection, tag question Similar to English "hey", "eh?", French "non?" and Spanish "¿no?" Asks or shows agreement and reflection at phrase-end, also used before sentences to catch listener's attention (informal).	
Phrases	Kimi wa kashikoi yo ne. 君は賢いよね。	You're pretty smart, aren't you.
Phrases	Kakkō ii desu ne. 格好いいですね。	That's pretty neat, eh?
Phrases	Ne, ima nanji? ね、いま何時？	Hey, what time is it?
ni に	Translates to: "to, in, at, on"; indirect object, direction; following a na-adjective, it creates an adverb	
Noun: location	Gakkō ni iru. 学校にいる。	I'm at/in school.
Noun: direction	Gakkō ni iku. 学校に行く。	I'm going to school.
Noun: indirect object	Ore ni kaese. 俺に返せ。	Give it back to me.
Noun: passive agent	Ka ni sasareta. 蚊にさされた。	I was bitten by a mosquito.
Noun, verbs (stem only): purpose, intent	Eiga o mi ni iku. 映画を見に行く。	I'm going to see a movie.
Adjective: forms adverb	teinei, teinei ni 丁寧、 丁寧に	polite, politely
ni te にて	Formal version of de, functions in exactly the same way. Etymology: Case particle ni + conjunctive particle te (cf. te form of Japanese verbs)	
ni wa には	Translates to: "for; in, to; in order to"; Etymology: ni + wa (always written は) The wa part is the topic particle. Serves as emphasis for a negative ending.	
Nouns: "for"	Shichimi wa, watashi ni wa kara-sugiru. 七味は、私には辛すぎる。	Shichimi is too spicy for me. (i.e., "you might like it, but I'm not touching it.")
Noun: "in, to"	Kyōto ni wa hana ga aru. 京都には花がある。	There are flowers in Kyōto. (Lit.: As for in Kyōto, there are flowers.)
Verb: "in order to"	Mizu o mitsukeru ni wa みずをみつけるには	In order to find water
no の	Functions as: possession indicator, noun link, topic marker (subordinate clauses), nominalization When nominalizing whole phrases, the no may function either as emphasis or as a question, depending on tone of voice. Similar to English, a falling tone denotes a statement, and a rising tone a question. Its use to mark statements tends to be more typical of feminine speech. See also Gender differences in spoken Japanese.	
Nouns: possession ex. a	sensei no kuruma 先生の車	the teacher's car
Noun: possession ex. b	watashi no konpyuuta 私のコンピューター	My computer
Noun: possession ex. c	anata no shukudai あなたの宿題	your homework
Noun: linking	kuruma no Toyota 車のトヨタ	Toyota the car [company]
Noun: subject marker in subordinate clauses (see also: ga)	Kare no tsukutta kēki wa oishikatta. 彼の作ったケーキはおいしかった。	The cake that he made was tasty.
i-adjectives: nominalization	Yasui no wa, kore. 安いのは、これ。	This is the cheap[er] one.
Verb: nominalization	Taberu no ga daisuki. 食べるのが大好き。	I love eating.
Phrases: nominalization, question	Mō, tabeta no? もう、食べたの？	Have you eaten yet?
Phrases: nominalization, question	Kuruma na no? 車なの？	Is it a car?
Phrases: nominalization, question	Kare ni mō ageta no yo! 彼にもうあげたのよ！	I already gave it to him!
no de ので	Translates to: "because" Etymology: no + de Colloquially, no de is often shortened to n de.	
Phrases	Tesuto ga aru no de, ikenai. テストがあるので、行けない。	Because I have a test, I can't go.
Phrases	Gakkō na no de, kin'en da. 学校なので、禁煙だ。	Because this is a school it's no smoking.
nomi のみ	Translates to: "only, just" Nomi is more formal and far less common than dake. Unlike dake, its only meaning is that of small quantity or singleness of frequency.	
Nouns	Tō-ten de wa, Nihon en nomi go-riyō itadakemasu. 当店では、日本円のみご利用頂けます。	This store accepts Japanese Yen only.
no ni のに	Translates to: "despite, although, even though; would have; in order to" Etymology: no + ni Nouns and na-adjectives must be followed by na before using this particle. No ni has a stronger meaning than kedo when used to mean "although", and conveys regret when used to mean "would have".	
Adjectives, verbs: "although"	Benkyō shiten no ni, eigo ga hanasenai. 勉強してんのに、英語が話せない。	Although I'm studying, I can't speak English.
Adjectives (conditional), verbs (conditional): "would have"	Kaette kitara, yokatta no ni. 帰ってきたら、よかったのに。	It would have been nice if you had come home.
Verb (plain form): "in order to"	Hikkosu no ni torakku ga hitsuyō da. 引っ越すのにトラックが必要だ。	(In order) to move, you need a truck.
o を	Functions as: direct object Translates to: "through, from, past (motion verbs only)" This is unrelated to the honorific prefix o, written お or 御.	
Nouns: direct object	Neko ga esa o tabeta. 猫が餌を食べた。	The cat ate the food.
Noun: through, etc. (motion)	Sora o tobu 空を飛ぶ	fly through the sky
sa/saa さ・さあ・さぁ	Functions as: Masculine sentence/phrase final particle, indicating explanation of obvious facts. It is softer than yo. Saa: Feminine sentence/phrase final particle, used like ne, but often more frequently as extremely colloquial filler.	
Phrases: masculine sa	Kanojo ga inai kara, dansu niwa ikanai sa. 彼女がいないから、ダンスには行かないさ。	I don't have a girlfriend, so I'm not going to the dance.
Phrases: saa	Kinō saa, gakkō de saa, sensei ni saa, chūi sarete saa, chō mukatsuita. 昨日さあ、学校でさあ、先生にさあ、注意されてさあ、超むかついた。	Like, yesterday, in, like, school, I, like, got fussed at by, like, some teacher, and it totally made me sick.
sae さえ	Sae: "even" Note the meaning overlaps with mo. Sae implies (usually) positive emphasis that the evident extent of something is greater than initially expected. Can be followed by mo for additional emphasis. Contrast this with sura.	
Nouns	Kanji sae kakeru. 漢字さえ書ける。	He can even write kanji.
de sae でさえ	Translates to: "even" Etymology: de + sae De sae replaces wa and ga, like de mo above.	
Nouns	Sonna koto wa saru de sae dekiru. そんなことは猿でさえできる。	Even a monkey can do that.
sae...ba/ra さえ…ば・ら	Function: sae followed by a verb in the conditional means "if only".	
Nouns	Kore sae nomeba, futsukayoi ga naoru yo. これさえ飲めば、二日酔いが直るよ。	If you would just drink this, your hangover would get better.
shi し	Translates to: "and what's more" (conjunction)	
Adjectives, verbs	Kirei da shi, hiroi shi, ii ne, kono apaato! きれいだし、広いし、いいね、このアパート。	It's clean, it's spacious; this apartment is nice, isn't it!
shika しか	Translates to: "only, just" Shika must be followed by a negative verb. Shika may be compounded as dakeshika, kirishika, and nomishika (plus the negative verb) to stress an extremely limited quantity or frequency.	
Nouns	Ichi en dama shika nai. 一円玉しかない。	I have just a one-yen coin.
Verb	Yūbin-kyoku ni iku shika nai. 郵便局に行くしかない。	The only thing [to do] is to go to the post office.
sura すら	Translates to: "even" Note the meaning overlaps with mo. Sura implies (usually) negative emphasis that the evident extent of something is less than initially expected. Contrast this with sae.	
Nouns	Kanji sura kakenai. 漢字すら書けない。	He can't even write kanji.
to と	Translates to: "and" (conjunction); "with" or "as with" (preposition); "if"; quotation.	
Nouns: conjunction	sore to kore それとこれ	that and this
Nouns: conjunction	sore to kore to それ と これ と	that or this
Verbs: transition/state change	taiyōkei dasshutsu e to chikazuite itta 太陽系 脱出 へ と 近づいて 行った｡	They were getting close to the point of leaving the Solar System.
Noun: preposition	Boku to ikitai? 僕と行きたい？	Do you want to go with me?
Verb, adjectives: "if"	Benkyō suru to wakaru. 勉強すると分かる。	If you study, you'll understand.
Any phrase: quotation	Umi made! to sakenda. 「海まで！」と叫んだ。	"To the sea!" he cried.
to ka とか	Functions as: A listing particle used like nado. Often used with the question word nani (what) in the form nantoka ("something or other"). Etymology: to + ka	
Nouns	Kani to ka, hotate to ka, zenbu tabeta yo. 蟹とか、帆立とか、全部食べたよ。	We had crab, scallops, [other stuff,] we ate them all.
to mo とも (共)	Tomo (共): "both, all of the" To mo (no kanji): "even if, even though; at the ...-est; whether; [emphasis]" If following a noun and used with a negative verb, meaning changes to "none". Etymology: to + mo	
Counted nouns	Watashi wa, aitsura ga futari tomo kirai da. 私は、あいつらが、二人とも嫌いだ。	I hate the both of those guys.
Counted nouns	Zannen nagara, sono kuruma wa san dai tomo irimasen. 残念ながら、その車は三台とも要りません。	Unfortunately, we need none of those three cars.
Volitional verbs	Dō shiyō to mo amari susumanai. どうしようともあまり進まない。	No matter how we try [to do something], we don't make much progress.
Adverbial (continuative) form of i-adjectives	Sukunaku to mo go-jū mairu aruite kita. 少なくとも五十マイル歩いてきた。	We walked at least fifty miles [to get here].
Adverbial (continuative) form of i-adjectives	Osoku to mo itte miyō yo. 遅くともいってみようよ。	Even if it's late, let's go and check it out.
Verb (paired with same verb in negative)	Kau to mo kawanai to mo hakkiri shite imasen. 買うとも買わないともはっきりしていません。	It isn't clear whether they're going to buy or not.
Verb, adjectives This use is similar to the English expression, "as if [something] wouldn't [phrase]."	Waratte ii to mo. 笑っていいとも。	It's okay to laugh.
Verb, adjectives This use is similar to the English expression, "as if [something] wouldn't [phrase]."	Ikimasen to mo. 行きませんとも。	As if I would go.
tte って	Written as って in hiragana, this is another form of to. It is a shortened version of toiu (という), the present progressive form of the verb iu (言う), "to say"; it functions as a type of verbal quotation mark. It is sometimes used for a direct quote, sometimes for an indirect quote, and sometimes simply to emphasize a word or concept. tte is casual, and (because it can be a direct quote) the politeness level of the quoted material does not necessarily reflect on the speaker. If you wish to be assuredly formal, use to iimasu instead of tte.	
Any phrase	Sugu kimasu tte すぐ来ますって。	Could be, "He said he'll come soon" (more politely) or, "He said, 'I'll come soon.'" (less so).
Any phrase	Arabiago tte, muzukashikunai? アラビア語って難しくない？	"Arabic─isn't it difficult?" (Emphasizing a word; used instead of というものは or は)
tteba ってば	Functions as:'strong emphasis marker, especially when the speaker has grown impatient. Etymology: te + ba	
Any phrase: quotation	kōhī datteba ! コーヒーだってば！	I said "coffee"!
wa は	は wa is a topic marker. In the current convention, it is spelt with the historical kana spelling は, despite its modern pronunciation, although it was occasionally spelt わ before spelling standardization. It is the source of the wa below. Not to be confused with the particle が.	
wa わ	わ wa is used at the end of the sentence to establish an emotional connection. It is used by both genders when it is pronounced with a falling intonation especially in dialects of Kansai, Nagoya and elsewhere, but with a rising intonation, it is generally used by females. This also conveys a certain deference to the speaker's wishes and emotions. It used to be spelt は as it derives from the wa above.	
ya や	Ya is used to make incomplete lists of things (usually nouns). To make an exhaustive list, the particle to is used instead.	
	Watashi no suki na tabemono wa okashi ya pan ya mikan nado desu 私の好きな食べ物はお菓子やパンやミカンなどです。	"I like snacks, bread and tangerines."
yara やら	Denotes either uncertainty or listing.	
yo よ	Yo comes at the end of the sentence, and is used to make assertions. Compare zo and ze below. Yo is also sometimes used after nouns, and functions as a vocative marker. This is especially used in older speech, poetry, and songs.	
	Kaeru yo! 帰るよ！	"I'm going home!"
	Saraba, tomo yo さらば友よ。	"Farewell, o friend!"
yori より	Yori can mean "from", and is also used to make comparisons. Yori is usually written より in hiragana.	
	Kono densha-wa, Kashiwa-yori saki wa kaku eki-ni tomarimasu この電車は柏より先は各駅に止まります。	"This train will stop at every station after Kashiwa".
	Dare-yori-mo kanemochi-ni naritai 誰よりも金持ちになりたい。	"I want to become richer than anyone (else)".
ze ぜ	ze indicates assertion. Used mostly by men, it is never considered polite. Compare yo and zo.	
zo ぞ	zo indicates assertion. Used mainly by men, it is considered somewhat less forceful and more positive than ze. Compare yo and ze above.	
zutsu ずつ	Zutsu denotes an equal or gradual distribution of quantity like "at a time" in "one at a time", "by" in "one by one", or "each" in "one each". It usually follows counted nouns, and is written with hiragana as ずつ.	
Noun: counted	Chokorēto-o ni-ko-zutsu tabemashita チョコレートを二個ずつ食べました。	Either "I ate two pieces of chocolate on each (countable) times." or "Each one ate (=shared) two pieces of chocolate (from larger amount)."

== Contrast ==
=== に ni and で de ===
Ni and de can both be used to show location, corresponding to the prepositions "in" or "at" in English. Their uses are mutually exclusive.

Ni, when used to show location, is used only with stative verbs such as iru, "to be, exist;" aru, "to be, exist, have;" and sumu, "to live, inhabit."

- 日本に住んでいる。 (Nihon-ni sunde iru. "I live in Japan.")
- 学校にいる。 (Gakkō-ni iru. "I am in school.")

De is used with action verbs to convey the place of action, as opposed to location of being.

- 学校で寝る。 (Gakkō-de neru. "I sleep in/at school.")
  - *Gakkō-ni neru. *"I sleep to school," is not usually used.

=== に ni and へ e ===
Ni and e can both indicate direction of motion, literally meaning "to" or "at" in English. However, as particles in Japanese directly modify the preceding noun, some Japanese language courses call this the "goal of movement" usage because it marks the goal of the movement. For example, in the sentence 私はうちに帰ります (Watashi wa uchi ni kaerimasu or "I'm going back home") the goal of the movement is home (uchi ni). In this sense, e is perhaps closer to English "towards" in terms of use (see example below). As long as ni is used directionally, it is possible to substitute e in its place. Ni used in other senses cannot be replaced by e:

- 学校に行く。 (Gakkō ni iku. "I'm going to school"), where 学校 gakkō, "school," is the destination of 行く iku, "go."
  - Gakkō e iku. "I'm going to school," where gakkō, "school," is the destination of iku, "go."
- 学校にいる。 (Gakkō ni iru. "I'm at school"), where 学校 gakkō, "school," is the location of いる iru, "be;" not a destination.
  - Gakkō e iru. *"I'm to school," is not a possible construction since "be" is not a verb of motion.
- 友達に会う。 (Tomodachi ni au "I'll meet my friends") where 友達 tomodachi, "friends," is the indirect object of 会う au, "meet;" not a destination.
  - Tomodachi e au *"I'll meet to my friends," which is impossible because "meet" is not a verb of motion.
- 本を買いに行った。 (Hon o kai ni itta "I went to buy a book"), where 買いに kai ni, "to buy," shows purpose or intent, and is a verbal adverb; not destination.
  - Hon o kai e itta *"I went towards buying a book," is not possible because kai, "buying," cannot be a destination.

Indicating direction, using e instead of ni is preferred when ni is used non-directionally in proximity:

- 友達に会いに京都へ行った。 (Tomodachi ni ai ni Kyōto e itta. "I went to Kyoto to meet my friends.")

Ni can not be replaced by e in all uses. It must be used with days of the week as in 日曜日に京都にいきます (Nichiyoubi ni Kyoto ni ikimasu "I will go to Kyoto on Sunday".) where ni is used both to mark the day of the week (日曜日) and the goal of the movement (京都). It is also required with numerical times (but not relative times). For example, ni must be used in the sentence 十一時に寝ます (Juu ichi ji ni nemasu "I will go to sleep at 11 o'clock") to mark the numerical time (十一時) but it is not used with the relative time words like tomorrow (明日), yesterday (昨日), today (今日), last week (先週), next month (来月), etc. For example, in the sentence 私は昨日仕事に行きませんでした (watashi wa kinou shigoto ni ikimasen deshita "I did not go to work yesterday") no particle is needed for "yesterday" (昨日), but ni is used to mark the goal of movement (仕事に).

=== が ga and を o ===
In some cases, ga and o are seemingly interchangeable. For example, with the tai form, meaning "want to", it is possible to say either of the following:

- ご飯が食べたい。 (Gohan ga tabetai. "I want to eat rice.")
- ご飯を食べたい。 (Gohan o tabetai. "I want to eat rice.")

This is because たい (an adjective indicating desire) can either be a helper adjective attached to a verb or a standalone adjective in conjunction with the previous verb depending on context. If the above sentences were broken down, they could be interpreted as

- ご飯が[食べたい]。 "Rice [is desired to be eaten]."
- [ご飯を食べ]たい。 "[Eating rice] is desirable."

=== に ni and と to ===
Ni and to are sometimes interchangeable in forms like になる ni naru and となる to naru. The ni naru form suggests a natural change, whereas to naru suggests change to a final stage.

=== や ya and と to ===
Ya is used for incomplete lists, whereas to is used for complete ones.

=== Historical particles ===
い i was used in Old Japanese and kanbun works. Its meaning is still debated, but has traditionally been considered emphatic.

== Differences from English prepositions ==
Although many Japanese particles fill the role of prepositions, there is often no equivalent in Japanese for English prepositions like "on" or "about". Instead, particles are often used along with verbs or nouns to modify another word where English would use a preposition. For example, ue is a noun meaning "top/up", and ni tsuite is a fixed verbal expression meaning "concerning":

テーブルの 上に ある。
Tēburu-no -ue-ni aru.
Table-OF top/up-AT exists.
"It's on the table."

あの 人は、 ギターに ついて 何でも わかる。
Ano hito-wa, gitā-ni tsuite nandemo wakaru.
That person-TOPIC guitar-TO concerning anything knows.
"That person knows everything about guitars."

== See also ==
- Adposition
- Chinese particles
- Okinawan particles
- Korean particles
- Japanese counter words
- Japanese grammar: particles
- Japanese verb conjugations
- Sentence-final particle
- Particles of the Kagoshima dialects

== Bibliography ==
- Chino, Naoko (2005). How to Tell the Difference Between Japanese Particles. Tokyo; New York: Kodansha International. ISBN 4-7700-2200-X.
- Makino, Seiichi; Tsutsui, Michio (1986). A Dictionary of Basic Japanese Grammar. Tokyo: Japan Times. ISBN 4-7890-0454-6.
- Makino, Seiichi; Tsutsui, Michio (1997). A Dictionary of Intermediate Japanese Grammar. Tokyo: Japan Times. ISBN 4-7890-0775-8.
- Martin, Samuel Elmo (2004). A Reference Grammar of Japanese. Honolulu: University of Hawai'i Press.
- Matsuoka McClain, Yoko (1981). A Handbook of Modern Japanese Grammar: Including Lists of Words and Expressions with English Equivalents for Reading Aid. Tokyo: Hokuseido Press. ISBN 4-590-00570-0.
- Ministry of Education, Science, Sports and Culture (September 15, 1935) [28 April 1917]. 助詞. 口語法別記 (in Japanese) (3rd ed.). Kyōbashi, Tokyo: Dainippon Tosho. pp. 307–410.
