= Topic marker =

Grammatical particle used to mark the topic of a sentence

A topic marker is a grammatical particle used to mark the topic of a sentence. It is found in Japanese, Korean, Kurdish, Quechua, Ryukyuan, Imonda and to a limited extent Classical Chinese. It often overlaps with the subject of a sentence, causing confusion for learners, as most other languages lack it. It differs from a subject in that it puts more emphasis on the item and can be used with words in other roles as well. Thus, the subject and the object are not always the topic and comment but often have straightforward relationships to them.

== Korean: 은/는 ==
The topic marker is one of many Korean particles. It comes in two varieties based on its phonetic environment: 은 (eun) is used after words that end in a consonant, and 는 (neun) is used after words that end in a vowel.

=== Example ===
In the following example, "school" (Korean: 학교; Hanja: 學校; RR: hakkyo) is the subject, and it is marked as the topic.

학교 는 저기 에 있다.
hakkyo neun jeogi e itta.
school TOP {over there} LOC is
(The) school is over there.

== Japanese: は (wa) ==
The topic marker is one of many Japanese particles. It is written with the hiragana は, which is normally pronounced ha, but when used as a particle, it is pronounced wa. If what is to be the topic would have had が (ga), the subject marker, or を ((w)o), the direct object marker, as its particle, they are replaced by は. Other particles (such as に, と, or で) are not replaced, and は is placed after them.

The English phrase "as for" is often used to convey the connotation of は although in many cases it sounds unnatural in English. However, it conveys some senses of the particle, one of which is to mark a change of topics. If people spoke about someone else and then switched to referring to themselves, they should say 私は (watashi wa; "as for me..."). Then, it is no longer necessary to mention again that they are talking about themselves.

=== Examples ===
In the following example, "car" (車, kuruma) is the subject and it marked as the topic. The が that would normally be there to mark the subject has been replaced by は. The topic normally is at the beginning of the clause.

車 は 新しい です。
kuruma wa atarashii desu.
car TOP new {[masu form of だ: copula]}
(The) car is new.

In the following example, "television" (テレビ, terebi) is the direct object and is marked as the topic. The を that would normally be there to mark the direct object has been replaced by は. The subject, marked by が, is "child" (子供, kodomo). Like before, the topic is at the beginning of the clause.

テレビ は 子供 が 見ます。
terebi wa kodomo ga mimasu.
television TOP child SBJ {[masu form of "to watch"]}
As for the TV, the child watches (it).

In the third example, "today" (今日, kyou) is used adverbially and is marked as the topic. Normally, there would be no particle marking it as an adverb and so は is simply added without replacing any particle. The subject, which is omitted, is assumed to be "I" (私, watashi). If it were made explicit, it would be marked by が. As before, the topic is at the beginning of the clause.

今日 は 学校 に 行きます。
Kyou wa gakkou ni ikimasu.
Today TOP school IO {[masu form of "to go"]}
As for today, (I) go to school.

== Okinawan: や ==
Okinawan uses the topic marker や (ya). If the topic is not a proper noun or ends with a short vowel, it tends to merge creating long vowels such as wan ya to wannee ("I am").

=== Example ===
あんまー や ちゅらさん.
anmaa ya churasan.
mother TOP beautiful
Mother is beautiful.

== Kurdish ==
In Kurdish and many related languages, there are certain fixes that signify emphasis and also the present continuous tense. They may give the sense of "also, too" by the sentence structure and the dialect. It is mostly translatable to English.

In Northern Kurdish and Zazaki, ezafe markers can function both as present continuous suffixes and are used for emphasis or statements in contrary. They can be used in all tenses. They have developed from sentences in which the subject is denoted to be the ... one for example: Em d kêm in u Xuedê ê temam e. (lit. We are lacking and God is the complete one. (=ê temam)). The ê is the topic marker in that comparison.

=== Examples ===
ez ê/a d bêj-m.
I TOP PRES say.1SG.
I am saying. / I am saying, I do say, I say. / I say too.

šma ê aue šm-en-ên.
You.plural TOP water drink.PRES.2PL.
You are drinking water. / You are drinking water, You do drink water, You drink water. / You drink water too.

In Central, Southern Kurdish and certain other dialects, the "e" prefix is used to signify the same senses mentioned previously. It originally denotes a meaning close to English "right" as in "right here, right now" etc. (Sorani e êre, e êsta), but when it is put before nouns, it emphasizes them and attracts the accent. It is equivalent to Northern Kurdish "a", as in a vêrê, a nha (right here, right now), which dialectally may also be used as used in Sorani.

=== Examples ===
e mn le-gel de dum.
TOP I with PRES talk.1SG.
I am talking to him/her. / I am talking to him, I do talk to him, I talk to him. / I talk to him too.

e to ire če ke-i?
TOP thou here what do-2SG.
What are you doing here? / What are you doing here, What do you do in here, What are you doing here? .

== Classical Chinese: 者 ==
者 (zhě) is used sporadically in Classical Chinese and only when an author wants to emphasize the topic. 者 is usually omitted, unlike in other languages in which a topic marker is generally required. Although 者 can be used as a suffix attached to a verb or adjective and then transforms the verb or adjective into a noun, its grammatical function, as a topic marker, is fundamentally different from that of a suffix and therefore cannot be viewed as a suffix.

For example, consider the sentence "陳勝者，陽城人也" (Chénshèng zhě, yángchéng rén yě), a famous sentence from the Records of the Grand Historian:

- Literal translation: Chen Sheng is a Yangcheng person.
- Semantic translation: Chen Sheng is from Yangcheng originally.
- Word for word explanation:
  - 陳勝: name of a 3rd-century B.C. rebel.
  - 者: Topic marker.
  - 陽城: name of a town.
  - 人: person.
  - 也: Is. (也 means is, am, or are when used in conjunction with 者; it can mean other things when used independently.)

者, as well as the sentence of "陳勝者，陽城人也", is romanized here according to modern Mandarin pronunciations. It is unclear how 者 and the entire sentence would have been pronounced 2,000 years ago (and what the proper romanization should have been).

=== Example ===
陳勝 者 陽城 人 也。
Chénshèng zhě Yángchéng rén yě.
{[person name]} TOP {[town name]} person is
Chen Sheng is a Yangcheng person.
<Chen Sheng is from Yangcheng originally.>

In modern Chinese, topic markers have been completely lost and are not used anywhere:

陳勝 (是) 陽城 人。
Chénshèng (shì) yángchéng rén.
{[person name]} (is) {[town name]} person
Chen Sheng (is) a Yangcheng person.
<Chen Sheng is from Yangcheng originally.>

是 can be omitted in some occasions.

== Quechua: -qa ==
The enclitic "-qa" is the topic marker for many Quechua languages. It can occur on nouns, pronouns and adverbs.

=== Example ===
In the following example, Tupaq is the subject and is marked as the topic. The evidential suffixe -mi marks the theme. Both suffixes are often used for non-verbal attributive predication in the third person. The topic normally goes at the beginning of the clause.

Tupaq -qa hatun runa -m.
{[person name]} TOP big person is
Tupaq is a big person.

== Mongolian: бол, болбол ==
The Mongolian language is known to have topic markers. A common one is "бол" (bol; in the traditional script: ᠪᠣᠯ), an abbreviation of "болбол" (bolbol; in the traditional script: ᠪᠣᠯᠪᠠᠯ), but there are a few other words. They have other uses as well.

== Turkic languages ==
In Kazakh болсақ (bolsaq) is used as a topic marker, which can mean also "if it be".

Although other Turkic languages use words or suffixes that originally have different meanings as topic markers, the Turkmen has the unique suffix -ä for that purpose, and other suffixes keep their literal meanings.

Azerbaijani uses isə/-sə, which means "as for", as a topic marker. Turkish also uses -ise/-se.

=== Examples ===
әке-м болса, көп ішеді.
father-GEN.1SG TOP a.lot drinks.
As for my father, he drinks a lot.

jeren ä heniz hem gelmändir.
Jeren TOP still hasn't come.
Jeren hasn't come yet.

mən isə günahkaram.
I am.TOP sinner.
As for me, I have committed a sin.

ben ise ev-de kaldım.
I TOP home-LOC stayed.
As for me, I stayed at home.

== See also ==
- Topic-prominent language
- Topic (linguistics)
- Japanese grammar
  - Thematic wa
  - Contrastive wa
- Japanese particles
  - wa
