= Kagoshima verb conjugations =

Verbal morphology of the Kagoshima dialects of Japan

The verbal morphology of the Kagoshima dialects is heavily marked by numerous distinctive phonological processes, as well as both morphological and lexical differences. The following article deals primarily with the changes and differences affecting the verb conjugations of the central Kagoshima dialect, spoken throughout most of the mainland and especially around Kagoshima City, though notes on peripheral dialects may be added. Like standard Japanese, verbs do not inflect for person or number, and come in nine basic stems. However, contrary to the standard language, all verbs ending with the stem -ru conjugate regularly as ichidan verbs, though irregularities are present in other forms.

Most notably, the distinction and irregular conjugation pattern of the shimo nidan or "lower bigrade" ending -(y)uru, which corresponds to standard Japanese -eru, is still preserved in the dialect. However, kami nidan or "upper bigrade" verbs ending in -iru have merged with all other verbs ending in -ru, in a similar fashion to other Kyushu dialects like that of Ōita.

== Imperfective ==
Type of verb	Underlying form	Surface Realization
Regular
う u (っ ʔ)	食う kuu (eat) 思う omou (think) 笑う waruu (laugh) 買う kau (buy)	食 ku ~ kuʔ 思 omo ~ omoʔ 笑 waru ~ waruʔ 買 ko ~ kaʔ
く ku	書く kaku (write)	書っ kaʔ
ぐ gu	稼ぐ kasegu (labour) 繋ぐ tsunagu (tie)	稼っ kaseʔ 繋っ tsunaʔ
つ tsu	立つ tatsu (stand)	立っ taʔ
る ru	見る miru (see)	見っ miʔ
ぶ bu	あすぶ asubu (play)	あすっ asuʔ
ぬ nu	ケ死ぬ keshinu (die)	ケ死ん keshin
む mu	読む yomu (read)	読ん yon
す su	出す dasu (take out)	出す das(u)
Irregular
ゆる yuru うる uru	見ゆる miyuru (be seen) すくる sukuru (save)	見ゆっ miyuʔ すくっ sukuʔ
ある aru (there is)		あっ aʔ
する suru (do)		すっ suʔ
来る kuru (come)		来っ kuʔ

The imperfective form, also known as the plain, the dictionary or the non-past form, is primarily used to mark a generic, affirmative action and generally overlaps the present and future tenses in English. So, for instance, a statement like 彼やあそけ行っ aya asoke iʔ could mean either "he is going over there" or "he will be going over there". Typically, context will provide the meaning, though temporal adverbs such as 今日 kyu "today", 今 inma "now" or 明日 ashita "tomorrow" may be used for clarification.

With regards to its conjugation paradigm, the imperfective form ends in -u for all verbs as in standard Japanese. Notably, however, the resulting stem is reduced according to the dialect's phonological rules. Thus, for ichidan verbs, -u will either coalesce with the previous vowel of the verb or become a moraic obstruent, while for nasal stems it reduces to a moraic nasal and for obstruents, a moraic obstruent. This applies to most areas of Kagoshima with some exceptions: namely, the peripheral islands, such as Ōsumi (including Tanegashima) and Koshikijima, do not reduce the endings.

When used predicatively, verbs in their imperfective form are commonly appended particles such as ど do and が ga in order to add more emphasis to the statement being said. In this way, 俺や書っど oya kaddo "I will write (it)" adds more insistence or assertion than saying 俺や書っ oya kaʔ alone. When used attributively, the verb is simply followed directly by the word or phrase it modifies: 書っ人 kaʔ futo (or kaffuto) "a person who writes".

== Perfective ==
The perfective or completive ending -ta, and its allomorph -da, marks an action or an event as a whole, often one that has previously taken place. It is thus frequently referred to as the "past tense" in English descriptions, though this is not always the case. In Southern Tanegashima, this ending is pronounced -tō and has -dō as its allomorphic variant.

In contrast to standard Japanese, verbs ending in -u will take on the form -uta rather than -tta, as in omou → omouta → omota. Similarly, a number of verbs with the morphological ending -gu will become -uda, while others will tend towards -ida. For example, 稼ぐ kasegu "labour" becomes kaseida, which is then coalesced as kaseda, whereas 繋ぐ tsunagu "tie" becomes tsunouda, which reduces to the form tsunoda. The same phenomenon can be observed with the -ku ending: while most verbs would become -ita, such as 書く kaku "write" → kaita → kete, some also become -uta, such as 退く noku "step aside" → nouta → nota.

Type	Perfective	Example	Perfective
Regular
う u	うた -uta	食う kuu (eat) 思う omou (think) 笑う waruu (laugh) 買う kau (buy)	食た kuta 思た omota 笑た waruta こた kota
く ku	いた -ita うた -uta	書く kaku (write) 退く noku (step aside)	けた keta のた nota
ぐ gu	いだ -ida うだ -uda	稼ぐ kasegu (labour) 繋ぐ tsunagu (tie)	稼だ kaseda 繋のだ tsunoda
つ tsu	った -tta	立つ tatsu (stand)	立った tatta
る ru	った -tta	見る miru (see)	見った mitta
ぶ bu	んだ -nda うだ -uda	あすぶ asubu (play)	あすんだ asunda あすだ asuda
ぬ nu	んだ -nda	ケ死ぬ keshinu (die)	ケ死んだ keshinda
む mu	んだ -nda うだ -uda	読む yomu (read)	読んだ yonda 読だ yoda
す su	した -shita	出す dasu (take out)	出した dashita
Irregular
ゆる yuru うる uru	えた eta	見ゆる miyuru (be seen) すくる sukuru (save)	見えた mieta すけた suketa
ある aru (there is)			あった atta
する suru (do)			した shita
来る kuru (come)			来た kita

== Negative ==
Type	Negative	Example	Negative
Regular
う u	わん -wan	食う kuu (eat) 思う omou (think) 笑う waruu (laugh) 買う kau (buy)	食わん kuwan 思わん omowan 笑わん waruwan 買わん kawan
く ku	かん -kan	書く kaku (write)	書かん kakan
ぐ gu	がん -gan	稼ぐ kasegu (labour) 繋ぐ tsunagu (tie)	稼がん kasegan 繋がん tsunagan
つ tsu	たん -tan	立つ tatsu (stand)	立たん tatan
る ru	らん -ran (たん -tan) (やん -yan)	見る miru (see)	見らん miran (見たん mitan) (見やん miyan)
ぶ bu	ばん -ban	あすぶ asubu (play)	あすばん asuban
ぬ nu	なん -nan	ケ死ぬ keshinu (die)	ケ死なん keshinan
む mu	まん -man	読む yomu (read)	読まん yoman
す su	さん -san はん -han	出す dasu (take out)	出さん dasan 出はん dahan
Irregular
ゆる yuru うる uru	えん	見ゆる miyuru (be seen) すくる sukuru (save)	見えん mien すけん suken
ある aru (there is)			ならん naran
する suru (do)			せん sen
来る kuru (come)			来ん kon

Negation is expressed by appending the suffix -n at the end of a verb in its imperfective stem form. This can be achieved by simply replacing the final -u in the underlying plain form with -a, and then tagging on the negative suffix: kaku → kakan "not write", wakaru → wakaran "not understand", etc. The two main irregularities in this form relate to verbs that stem in -ru and -su in their plain forms. Verbs with the stem -ru may take on the ending -tan instead of -ran, especially if the preceding syllable is a devoiced one. So the negative form of the verb shiru "know" is shitan rather than shiran, as the syllable shi [ɕi̥] is devoiced. The alternative ending -yan is much more rare, occurring only in a few regions, and most prominently only when the preceding syllable contains a non-devoiced [i]. For verbs with the stem -su, the ending may be realized as either -san or -han with no rules governing its use other than speaker and dialect preference.

Verbs whose underlying imperfective form ends in -uru (-eru in standard Japanese), otherwise known as shimo nidan or "lower bigrade" verbs, are also noticeably irregular. For such verbs, the entire ending become -en when negated. For example, the underlying verb 見ゆる miyuru becomes 見えん mien "not be seen", and 投ぐる naguru becomes 投げん nagen "not give up".

Contrary to popular belief, the suffix -n does not derive from a relaxed pronunciation of the standard negative form -nai, as demonstrated through the discrepancy between such forms as minai → *miran "not see", and shinai → *sen "not do". Further, considering the phonological characteristics of the dialect, the form -ne would be expected if such were the case. Rather, the negative suffix -n derives from the older attributive suffix -nu, which can still be encountered in various literary works. And while the oldest examples showing -nai date back to the 16th century, -nu is attested as early as the 8th century in the Kojiki, and is believed to have already been reduced to its present form -n during the Edo period. The first line of the 11th century classical novel The Tale of Genji provides an example of its use: "(...) ito yamugoto-naki kifa-ni-fa ara-nu ga (...)", translated as "though (she) is not quite of a nobel birth".

The past negative form can be accomplished by compounding the regular negative verb form with the past form of the copula, yielding such constructions as kakanjatta, kakannyatta, or, more rarely, kakannatta "did not write" depending on the region's preferred variant. The form -nkatta, as in kakankatta, has also been observed in the Ōsumi and Morokata regions, as well as the city of Kagoshima itself.

Negative commands or orders are informally marked by tagging on the suffix -na to the plain form: 行く iku "to go" → 行っな inna, iʔna (most regions), 行くな ikuna (Tanegashima, Koshikijima), 行っだ idda (Yakushima) "don't go". In western Ōsumi, the -na suffix commonly co-occurs with the auxiliary verb yaru, which is then combined to the continuative i form of a verb: 行く iku → 行っきゃっな ikkyanna. Formally, negative commands are marked by appending -ji(n) either directly to the imperfective ending or to the negative form: 行く iku → 行かぢ ikaji, or 行かんじ ikanji "do not go".

Lastly, the negative form can also be used as a suggestive or light imperative when followed by the particle か ka. Thus, for the verb "eat", 食わんか kuwan ka would effectively mean along the lines of "go ahead and eat" or simply "(please) eat". Note that this form is not the same as the standard Japanese construction -nai ka?, as it functions more as an imperative than a negative question. So a sentence like ゆっくい行かんか yukkui ikan ka would mean "(please) go slowly" and not "won't you go slowly?", unless the intonation is explicitly rising.

== i form ==
Type	i form	Example	Underlying i form	Surface Realization
Regular
う u	い -i	食う kuu (eat) 思う omou (think) 笑う waruu (laugh) 買う kau (buy)	食い kui 思い omoi 笑い warui 買い kai	き ki おめ ome わり wari け ke
く ku	き -ki	書く kaku (write)	書き kaki	書っ kaʔ
ぐ gu	ぎ -gi	稼ぐ kasegu (labour) 繋ぐ tsunagu (tie)	稼ぎ kasegi 繋ぎ tsunagi	稼っ kaseʔ 繋っ tsunaʔ
つ tsu	ち -chi	立つ tatsu (stand)	立ち tachi	立っ taʔ
る ru	り -ri っ -ʔ	見る miru (see)	見り miri	見い mi(i) 見っ miʔ
ぶ bu	び -bi	あすぶ asubu (play)	あすび asubi	あすっ asuʔ
ぬ nu	に -ni	ケ死ぬ keshinu (die)	ケ死に keshini	ケ死ん keshin
む mu	み -mi	読む yomu (read)	読み yomi	読ん yon
す su	し -shi	出す dasu (take out)	出し dashi	出し dash(i)
Irregular
ゆる yuru うる uru	え -e	見ゆる miyuru (be seen) すくる sukuru (save)	見え mie すけ suke	
ある aru (there is)			あい ai	
する suru (do)			し shi	
来る kuru (come)			き ki	

The i form, also called the conjunctive, the continuative, the infinitive, the nominative or the ren'yōkei form, may be used for two main purposes: deriving nouns from verbs and creating compound constructions. This form can be achieved by simply changing the vowel -u of the underlying plain form to -i, and then applying the necessary sound changes afterwards. Contrary to the standard Japanese language, this form is completely regular for verbs ending with the plain stem -ru. Thus, the underlying verb 食もる tamoru "eat" would become 食もい tamoi (< tamori), instead of just reducing to the root as in standard Japanese.

There may, however, be some irregularity when deriving nouns or compounds, as verbs ending with the plain stems -u and -ru may become a moraic obstruent as opposed to the vowel /i/. For example, the underlying verb 買う kau "buy" could become /kaQ/ in its nominal form rather than /ke/ "buying", also creating a doublet between かっもん /kaQmoN/ and けもん /kemoN/ "shopping". Similarly, the underlying verb 知る shiru "know" could become /siQ/ rather than /sii/, leading to the polite construction 知っもさん /siQmosaN/ "not know" rather than /si(i)mosaN/.

Further, when the i form is used in a compound construction and the second verb begins with a vowel or a palatal consonant, the underlying stem may:

- Glide directly into the following vowel, especially with verbs whose base stem is ru (e.g. 取る toru + 上ぐる aguru: とり tori + あぐる aguru → とやぐっ toyaguʔ "pick up");
- Be doubled, especially with verbs whose underlying stem is a nasal consonant (e.g. 読む yomu + やる yaru: よみ yomi + やる yaru → よっみゃっ yommyaʔ "(formal) read");
- Be doubled and glided to avoid a hiatus, especially with verbs whose underlying stem is a plosive consonant (e.g. 打つ utsu + 置く oku: うち uchi + おく oku → うっちょっ utchoʔ "leave things as is").

The use of the i form for linking verbs together and creating compounds is especially prominent for adding a nuance of politeness. The verbs やる yaru, やす yasu and やんす yansu, for instance, act as honorific auxiliaries and are frequently used in imperative constructions as in 食もいやんせ tamoi-yanse "please eat" or 遊っびゃんせ asubbyanse "please play" (also 遊っやんせ asuʔ-yanse), which would be the equivalent of 食べなさい tabenasai and 遊びなさい asobinasai in standard Japanese. Similarly, the verbs もす mosu (or もうす mōsu in Tanegashima) and もんす monsu, sometimes written as 申す and 申んす, will add a degree of politeness akin to the standard Japanese ending ます -masu. Thus, for 食もる tamoru "eat" and 読む nomu "drink", the polite forms would be 食もいもす tamoi-mosu and 飲んもす non-mosu respectively.

== Te form ==
Type	Te form	Example	Te form
Regular
う u	うて -ute	食う kuu (eat) 思う omou (think) 笑う waruu (laugh) 買う kau (buy)	食て kute 思て omote 笑て warute こた kote
く ku	いて -ite うて -ute	書く kaku (write) 退く noku (step aside)	けて kete のて note
ぐ gu	いで -ide うで -ude	稼ぐ kasegu (labour) 繋ぐ tsunagu (tie)	稼で kasede つので tsunode
つ tsu	って -tte	立つ tatsu (stand)	立って tatte
る ru	って -tte	見る miru (see)	見って mitte
ぶ bu	んで -nde うで -ude	あすぶ asubu (play)	あすんで asunde あすで asude
ぬ nu	んで -nde	ケ死ぬ keshinu (die)	ケ死んで keshinde
む mu	んで -nde うで -ude	読む yomu (read)	読んで yonde 読で yode
す su	して -shite いて -ite	出す dasu (take out) 貸す kasu (lend)	出して dashite けて kete
Irregular
ゆる yuru うる uru	えて -ete	見ゆる miyuru (be seen) すくる sukuru (save)	見えて miete すけて sukete
ある aru (there is)			あって atte
する suru (do)			して shite
来る kuru (come)			来て kite

The te form or the participle form functions in much the same way as it does in standard Japanese, being able to link different verbs and clauses together, and on its own expressing a slight command. It differs, however, largely in its pronunciation. Depending on the speaker and dialect, it might be pronounced anywhere from [te̞], [t͡ɕe̞], [sse̞(ː)] or [ɕɕe̞(ː)], which may or may not be reflected with the spellings て te, ちぇ che, っせ(え) sse(e) and っしぇ(ー) sshe(e). Its voiced counterpart de exhibits the same phenomenon, being pronounced [de̞], [d͡ʑe̞] or [ʑe̞], which could be written as で de, ぢぇ je or じぇ je respectively. The spellings て te and で de are here favoured, though the affricated pronunciations [t͡ɕe̞] and [ʑe̞] are the most common.

The form also differs slightly in its paradigm, as verbs that end with the morphological ending -u will take on the form -ute rather than -tte, which is used in the standard language. For example, the underlying verb 会う au "meet" would become あうて aute, which is then coalesced to the form おて ote. Similarly, a number of verbs with the morphological ending -gu will become -ude, while others will tend towards -ide. For example, 剥ぐ hagu "tear off" becomes haide, which is then coalesced as hede, while 急ぐ isogu "rush" becomes isoude in its underlying form, which is then coalesced as isode. This can also be observed with the ending -ku, although to a much lesser extent. Most verbs ending in -ku will become -ite in this form, so that 書く kaku "write" becomes kaite, which is then coalesced as kete. A few others will become -ute, so that 退く noku "step aside/down" becomes noute, which is coalesced as note. Lastly, for verbs with the stems -mu and -bu, the ending -nde may be optionally vocalized as -ude. So 飛ぶ tobu "fly" could become either tonde or tode (< toude). And for verbs ending in -su, the form -shite may be reduced to -ite, so that 貸す kasu "lend" becomes kaite instead of kashite, which may be coalesced into kete.

The continuous or progressive aspect, which is formed with the te form followed by the auxiliary いる iru in standard Japanese, follows a similar development in most Kagoshima dialects, using the auxiliary verb おる oru instead. The te form is then combined and merged with the verb, becoming ちょる -choru or in some areas とる -toru, which have ぢょる (じょる) -joru and どる doru as their respective voiced counterparts. Thus, as the te form of the verb 食う kuu "eat" is くて kute, its progressive form would generally be expressed as 食ちょっ kuchoʔ "eating", while the progressive form of 読む yomu "read" would become either 読んぢょっ yonjoʔ or 読ぢょっ yojoʔ "reading", reflecting the voicing in its participle forms 読んで yonde and 読で yode. In other dialects, the continuous-progressive aspect is constructed using the i form followed by the auxiliary oru. Some dialects may even make a semantic distinction between the two, with the first marking the resultative aspect, and the second, the continuous aspect. So 雨が降っちょっ ame ga futchoʔ would effectively mean "it has rained", while 雨が降よっ ame ga fuyoʔ would mean "it is raining".

== Imperative ==
Type	Imperative	Example	Imperative
Regular
う u	え -e	食う kuu (eat) 思う omou (think) 笑う waruu (laugh) 買う kau (buy)	食ぇ kwe 思め ome 笑るえ warue け ke
く ku	け -ke	書く kaku (write) 退く noku (step aside)	書け kake 退け noke
ぐ gu	げ -ge	稼ぐ kasegu (labour) 繋ぐ tsunagu (tie)	稼げ kasege 繋げ tsunage
つ tsu	て -te	立つ tatsu (stand)	立て tate
る ru	れ -re → い -i	見る miru (see)	見れ mire 見い mii
ぶ bu	べ -be	あすぶ asubu (play)	あすべ asube
ぬ nu	ね -ne	ケ死ぬ keshinu (die)	ケ死ね keshine
む mu	め -me	読む yomu (read)	読め yome
す su	せ -se	出す dasu (take out) 貸す kasu (lend)	出せ dase かせ kase
Irregular
ゆる yuru うる uru	え -e	見ゆる miyuru (be seen) すくる sukuru (save)	見え mie すけ suke
ある aru (there is)			–
する suru (do)			せ se
来る kuru (come)			け ke

The imperative form is achieved by replacing the vowel -u of the underlying plain form to -e, and subsequently applying the appropriate sound changes. Namely, vowel coalescence is usually observed with verbs whose stem ends in just a vowel, and for verbs whose stem is -ru, the resulting form -re is often reduced to -i, so that 食もれ tamore would become 食もい tamoi "eat!". This leads to overlap with the i form, though context is usually sufficient to disambiguate the two. The form is regularized in comparison to standard Japanese, as the dialect only makes use of the ending -e and never -ro as an imperative, and the form -i observed with -ru verbs is here the result of a regular sound change, whereas in Japanese it is not so due to borrowing from the Kansai dialect.

In order to form polite imperative commands, the auxiliary verb やる yaru, along with its variants やす yasu and やんす yansu, may be changed to its imperative form and appended to another verb in its conjunctive i form. For example, the polite form of the verb "eat" could become 食もいやい tamoi-yai or 食もいやんせ tamoi-yanse "please eat!". When it comes to verbs whose stems reduce to a moraic obstruent in the i form, two outcomes are possible. First, the auxiliary can be appended directly without any change, giving 書っやい kaʔ-yai for "please write". Otherwise, the underlying stem will usually be doubled and subsequently glided in order to avoid a hiatus, resulting in the form 書っきゃい kakkyai for "please write".

== Volitional (Presumptive) ==
Type	Volitional	Example	Volitional
Regular
う u	え -o	食う kuu (eat) 思う omou (think) 笑う waruu (laugh) 買う kau (buy)	食ぉ kwo 思も omo わろ waro こ ko
く ku	け -ke	書く kaku (write) 退く noku (step aside)	書こ kako 退こ noko
ぐ gu	ご -go	稼ぐ kasegu (labour) 繋ぐ tsunagu (tie)	稼ご kasego 繋ご tsunago
つ tsu	と -to	立つ tatsu (stand)	立と tato
る ru	ろ -ro	見る miru (see)	見ろ miro
ぶ bu	ぼ -bo	あすぶ asubu (play)	あすぼ asubo
ぬ nu	の -no	ケ死ぬ keshinu (die)	ケ死の keshino
む mu	も -mo	読む yomu (read)	読も yomo
す su	す -so	出す dasu (take out) 貸す kasu (lend)	出そ daso 貸そ kaso
Irregular
ゆる yuru うる uru	ゆ -yu う -u	見ゆる miyuru (be seen) すくる sukuru (save)	見ゆ miyu すく suku
ある aru (there is)			あろ aro
する suru (do)			すう sū
来る kuru (come)			く ku

The volitional or presumptive form is essentially used to express either intention or probability. It is historically formed by appending the speculative or intentional suffix -u, itself a reduction of the earlier form you, to the conjunctive i form. The resulting ending was then contracted to -ō and later -o in the mainland dialects. One main exception to this is that for verbs whose underlying imperfective form ends in -uru (-eru in standard Japanese), otherwise known as shimo nidan or "lower bigrade" verbs, the entire ending is reduced to -u instead. For example, the verb 開くっ akuʔ (standard 開ける akeru) "open" becomes 開く aku "intend on opening", and 上ぐっ aguʔ (standard 上げる ageru) "raise" becomes 上ぐ agu "intend on raising". Another exception is that, for verbs modelled off the verbs "to do" or "to come", otherwise known as sagyō and kagyō irregular verbs, the endings become -sū or -ku respectively.

This form is also noticeably used in conjunction with the verb ごたっ gotaʔ (ごたる gotaru), or its variants ごあっ goaʔ and ごちゃっ gochaʔ, to indicate desire or express a wish to do something. For example, 食ぉごたっ kwo-gotaʔ means "want to eat", あすぼごたっ asubo-gotaʔ means "want to play", and 投ぐごあっ nagu-goaʔ (from the shimo nidan verb 投ぐる naguru) means "want to give up". This auxiliary verb can also be used with more stative verbs to indicate the notion of "it seems to be", "it looks", or "it looks like it is going to". For instance, 雨が降ろごたっ ame ga furo-gotaʔ effectively means "it looks like it will rain".

== Conditional ==
Type	Conditional	Example	Conditional
Regular
う u	えば -eba	食う kuu (eat) 思う omou (think) 笑う waruu (laugh) 買う kau (buy)	食ぇば kweba 思めば omeba 笑れば wareba けば keba
く ku	けば -keba	書く kaku (write) 退く noku (step aside)	書けば kakeba 退けば nokeba
ぐ gu	げば -geba	稼ぐ kasegu (labour) 繋ぐ tsunagu (tie)	稼げば kasegeba 繋なげば tsunageba
つ tsu	てば -teba	立つ tatsu (stand)	立てば tateba
る ru	れば -reba	見る miru (see)	見れば mireba
ぶ bu	べば -beba	あすぶ asubu (play)	あすべば asubeba
ぬ nu	ねば -neba	ケ死ぬ keshinu (die)	ケ死ねば keshineba
む mu	めば -meba	読む yomu (read)	読めば yomeba
す su	せば -seba	出す dasu (take out) 貸す kasu (lend)	出せば daseba 貸せば kaseba
Irregular
ゆる yuru うる uru	ゆれば -yureba うれば -ureba	見ゆる miyuru (be seen) すくる sukuru (save)	見ゆれば miyureba すくれば sukureba
ある aru (there is)			あれば areba
する suru (do)			すれば sureba
来る kuru (come)			来れば kureba

The conditional form is made by changing the final -u in the imperfective form (終止形) to -eba, and then applying sound changes typical to the Kagoshima dialects, such as vowel coalescence. For example, the verb 食う kuu "to eat" shown in the table becomes 食えば kueba like in standard Japanese, which is then contracted to 食ぇば kweba.

== Causative ==
Type	Causative	Example	Causative
Regular
う u	わさすっ -wasasuʔ	食う kuu (eat) 思う omou (think) 笑う waruu (laugh) 買う kau (buy)	食ゎさすっ kwasasuʔ 思もわさすっ omowasasuʔ 笑るわさすっ waruwasasuʔ 買わさすっ kawasasuʔ
く ku	かすっ -kasuʔ	書く kaku (write) 退く noku (step aside)	書かすっ kakasuʔ 退かすっ nokasuʔ
ぐ gu	がすっ -gasuʔ	稼ぐ kasegu (labour) 繋ぐ tsunagu (tie)	稼がすっ kasegasuʔ 繋ながすっ tsunagasuʔ
つ tsu	たすっ -tasuʔ	立つ tatsu (stand)	立たすっ tatasuʔ
る ru	らすっ -rasuʔ	見る miru (see)	見らすっ mirasuʔ
ぶ bu	ばすっ -basuʔ	あすぶ asubu (play)	あすばすっ asubasuʔ
ぬ nu	なすっ -nasuʔ	ケ死ぬ keshinu (die)	ケ死なすっ keshinasuʔ
む mu	ますっ -masuʔ	読む yomu (read)	読ますっ yomasuʔ
す su	さすっ -sasuʔ	出す dasu (take out) 貸す kasu (lend)	出さすっ dasasuʔ 貸さすっ kasasuʔ
Irregular
ゆる yuru うる uru	えらすっ -erasuʔ	見ゆる miyuru (be seen) すくる sukuru (save)	見えらすっ mierasuʔ すけらすっ sukerasuʔ
ある aru (there is)			–
する suru (do)			さすっ sasuʔ
来る kuru (come)			来さすっ kosasuʔ

The causative form differs from standard Japanese in that it becomes -(was)asuru rather than -(was)aseru. This form can be achieved by replacing the final -u in the underlying plain form with -asuru or, for verbs stemming in just -u, -wasasuru. These are then reduced to -asuʔ and -wasasuʔ respectively following regular sound changes, though the latter ending may further reduce to -wassuʔ in speech, resulting in 食ゎっすっ kwassuʔ instead of 食ゎさすっ kwasasuʔ "to make (someone) eat". The difference observed between the dialectal form -(as)asuru and the standard form -(as)aseru is also representative of the fact that this form conjugates like other shimo nidan or "lower bigrade" verbs. Consequently, it is notably irregular in comparison to other -ru verbs in the i form and imperative form where it becomes -sase, as well as the volitional form where it becomes -sasu. It is also irregular in the negative form, where it becomes -sasen.

== Passive ==
Type	Passive	Example	Passive
Regular
う u	わるっ -waruʔ	食う kuu (eat) 思う omou (think) 笑う waruu (laugh) 買う kau (buy)	食ゎるっ kwaruʔ 思もわるっ omowaruʔ 笑るわるっ waruwaruʔ 買わるっ kawaruʔ
く ku	かるっ -karuʔ	書く kaku (write) 退く noku (step aside)	書かるっ kakaruʔ 退かるっ nokaruʔ
ぐ gu	がるっ -garuʔ	稼ぐ kasegu (labour) 繋ぐ tsunagu (tie)	稼がるっ kasegaruʔ 繋ながるっ tsunagaruʔ
つ tsu	たるっ -taruʔ	立つ tatsu (stand)	立たるっ tataruʔ
る ru	らるっ -raruʔ	見る miru (see)	見らるっ miraruʔ
ぶ bu	ばるっ -baruʔ	あすぶ asubu (play)	あすばるっ asubaruʔ
ぬ nu	なるっ -naruʔ	ケ死ぬ keshinu (die)	ケ死なるっ keshinaruʔ
む mu	まるっ -maruʔ	読む yomu (read)	読まるっ yomaruʔ
す su	さるっ -saruʔ	出す dasu (take out) 貸す kasu (lend)	出さるっ dasaruʔ 貸さすっ kasaruʔ
Irregular
ゆる yuru うる uru	えらるっ -eraruʔ	見ゆる miyuru (be seen) すくる sukuru (save)	見えらるっ mieraruʔ すけらるっ sukeraruʔ
ある aru (there is)			–
する suru (do)			さるっ saruʔ
来る kuru (come)			来らるっ koraruʔ

The passive form conjugates like other shimo nidan or "lower bigrade" verbs ending in -uru.
