= Korean postpositions =

Postpositions in Korean

Korean postpositions, or particles, are suffixes or short words in Korean grammar that immediately follow a noun or pronoun. This article uses the Revised Romanization of Korean to show pronunciation. The hangul versions in the official orthographic form are given underneath.

Preceding syntactic element	Example sentence	Translation
(n-)eun 은/는	Used as a topic particle or a subject particle. Eun 은 is used following a consonant, Neun 는 is used following a vowel.	
Nouns (topic)	Naneun haksaengida. 나는 학생이다.	I am a student.
Nouns (topic)	Igeoseun yeonpirida. 이것은 연필이다.	This is a pencil.
Nouns (genericized nominative)	Chitaneun ppareuda. 치타는 빠르다.	Cheetahs are fast.
Nouns (topic)	Jeoneun jjajangmyeon juseyo. 저는 짜장면 주세요.	I'd like a jajangmyeon.
i/ga 이/가	Used as an identifier or subject particle to indicate the nominative case. I 이 is used following a consonant, Ga 가 is used following a vowel.	
Nouns (agent)	Naega masyeotda. 내가 마셨다.	I drank.
Nouns (identifier)	Jeogeosi Han-gang-iya. 저것이 한강이야.	That is the Han River.
Nouns (specific nominative)	Chitaga neurida. 치타가 느리다.	This cheetah is slow.
kkeseo 께서	The honorific nominative marker. It could be added to Neun, Do, and Man to form 께서는 (topic), 께서도 (too/also), and 께서만 (only), respectively, which are the respective honorific forms.	
Nouns	Seonsaengnimkkeseo osyeotda. 선생님께서 오셨다.	(The) teacher arrived .
(r-)eul 을/를	Used as an object particle to indicate the accusative case. Eul 을 is used following a consonant, Reul 를 is used following a vowel.	
Nouns (objective)	Naneun ramyeoneul meogeotda. 나는 라면을 먹었다.	I ate ramen.
ege/hante 에게/한테	Used as a dative particle. Ege 에게 is the literary form, and Hante 한테 is the colloquial form.	
Noun	Neohuiege hal mari itda. 너희에게 할 말이 있다.	I have something to tell you.
kke 께	Kke 께 is the honorific dative marker.	
Noun	Goyongjukke seonmureul deuryeotda. 고용주께 선물을 드렸다.	I gave a gift to my employer.
(eu)ro 으로/로	Used to mark the instrumental case, which can also denote destination or role. Euro 으로 is used following a consonant other than 'ㄹ', which is abbreviated to Ro 로 following a vowel or the consonant 'ㄹ'.	
Noun (means)	KTX-ro Seoureseo Busankkaji se sigan geollinda. KTX로 서울에서 부산까지 3시간 걸린다.	It takes 3 hours to go from Seoul to Busan via KTX.
Noun (destination)	Naeil Hojuro tteonamnida. 내일 호주로 떠납니다.	I am leaving for Australia tomorrow.
Noun (role)	Unjeonsaro chwijikhaeyo. 운전사로 취직해요.	I'm going to be working as a driver.
e 에	Used for any words relating to time or place. Sometimes used for cause.	
Time (noun)	Maikeureun parweore watda. 마이클은 8월에 왔다.	Michael came in August.
Location (noun)	Jedongeun ilbone gatda. 제동은 일본에 갔다.	Jedong went to Japan.
Cause (noun)	Jamyeongjong sorie kkaetta 자명종 소리에 깼다.	Woke up by the sound of the alarm.
eseo 에서	Translates to: "from" (ablative) when used with a motion verb. May also be used as "at", "in" (locative) when used with an action verb which is not motion related.	
Noun (from)	Junggugeseo wasseo. 중국에서 왔어.	I came from China.
Noun (in)	Bang-eseo gongbu-reul haet-da. 방에서 공부를 했다.	I studied in my room.
buteo 부터	Translates to: Used to show when or where an action or situation started. (Egressive)	
Noun	Cheoeumbuteo kkeutkkaji 처음부터 끝까지	From beginning to end
kkaji 까지	Translates to: Used to illustrate the extent of an action, either in location or time, generally meaning "until", "up to". (Terminative)	
Noun	Cheoeumbuteo kkeutkkaji 처음부터 끝까지	From beginning to end
man 만	Translates to: "only", used after a noun.	
Noun	Ojik jeimseu-man hangugeo-reul gongbu-haet-da. 오직 제임스만 한국어를 공부했다.	Only James studied Korean.
ui 의	Functions as: possession indicator, noun link, topic marker.	
Noun: possession	Migugui daetongryeong 미국의 대통령	President of the United States
do 도	Used as an additive particle. When dealing with additive qualities/descriptions of the same subject, see ttohan 또한.	
Nouns	Geunyeodo gongbuhanda. 그녀도 공부한다.	She studies too.
(g)wa/rang 과/와/랑	Translates to: "and" (conjunction); "with" or "as with" (preposition). Gwa 과 is used following a consonant, Wa 와 is used following a vowel. Wa 와 is the literary form, and rang 랑 is the colloquial form.	
Nouns: conjunction	Neowa na 너와 나	You and I
(y)a 아/야	The vocative marker. A 아 is used following a consonant, Ya 야 is used following a vowel.	
Noun	Minsuya! 민수야!	Minsu!
(i)yeo 이여/여	The vocative marker, with added nuance of exclamation. Iyeo 이여 is used following a consonant, Yeo 여 is used following a vowel.	
Noun	Naui georukhasin gusejuyeo. 나의 거룩하신 구세주여.	O my divine Redeemer.
