= Japanese dialects =

Dialects of the Japanese language

Japanese
- Geographic distribution: Japan
- Linguistic classification: Japonic: Japanese
- Subdivisions: Eastern; Western; Kyūshū; Hachijō

Language codes
- Glottolog: japa1256 Japanesic nucl1643
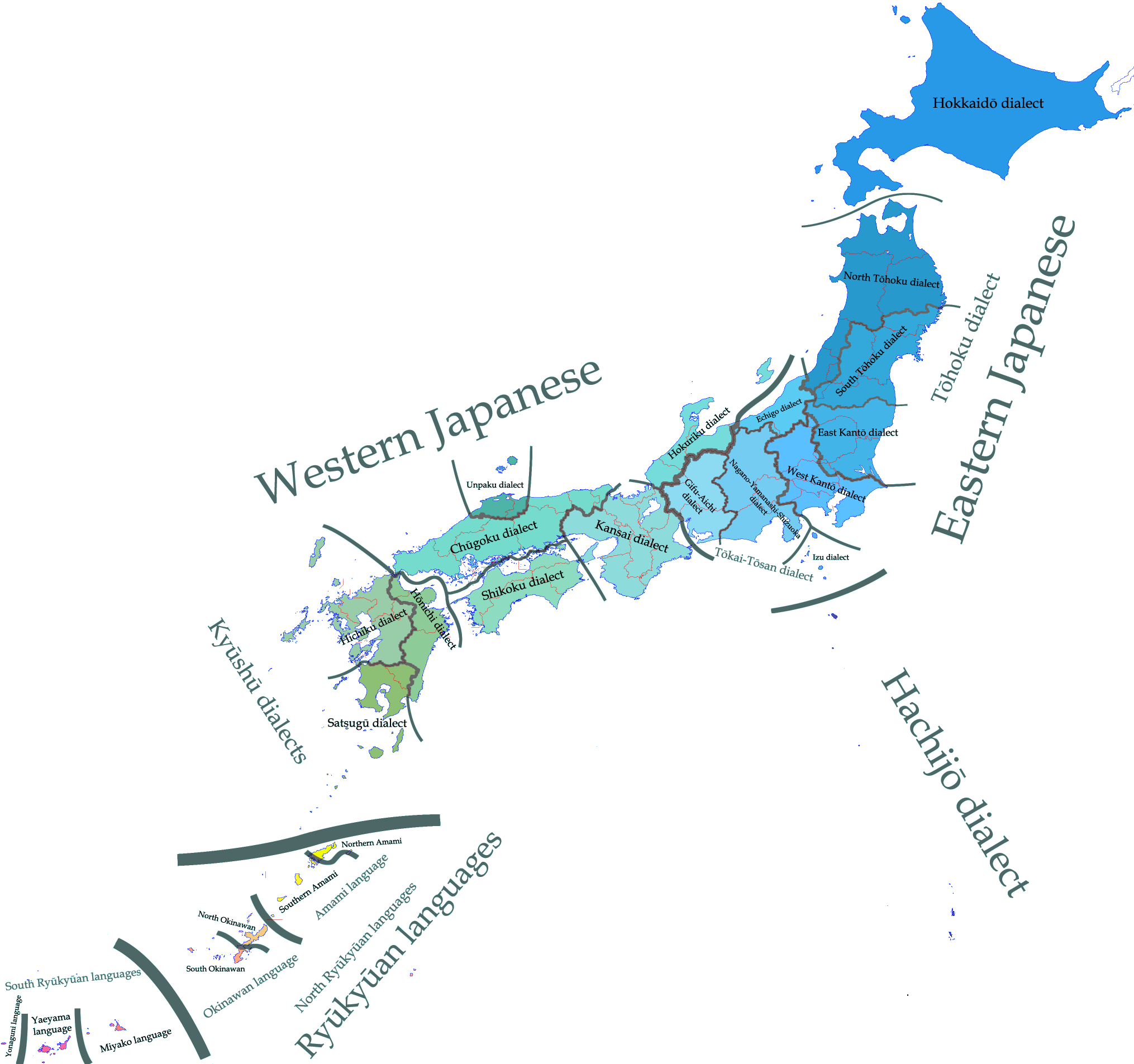
- Map of Japanese dialects (north of the heavy grey line)

The dialects (方言, hōgen) of the Japanese language fall into two primary clades, Eastern (including modern capital Tokyo) and Western (including old capital Kyoto), with the dialects of Kyushu and Hachijō Island often distinguished as additional branches, the latter perhaps the most divergent of all. Japan with its numerous islands and mountains has the ideal setting for developing many dialects.

The Ryukyuan languages of Okinawa Prefecture and the southern islands of Kagoshima Prefecture form a separate branch of the Japonic family and are completely distinct languages from Japanese. They are not Japanese dialects, although they are often erroneously referred to as such. The Ainu language of Hokkaido is even more distinct, belonging to an entirely different language family.

== History ==
Regional variants of Japanese have been confirmed since the Old Japanese era. The Man'yōshū, the oldest existing collection of Japanese poetry, includes poems written in dialects of the capital (Nara) and eastern Japan, but other dialects were not recorded. The compiler included azuma uta ("eastern songs") that show that eastern dialect traits were distinct from the western dialect of Nara. It is not clear if the capital of Nara entertained the idea of a standard dialect, however, they had an understanding which dialect should be regarded as the standard one, the dialect of the capital.

The recorded features of eastern dialects were rarely inherited by modern dialects, except for a few language islands such as Hachijo Island. In the Early Middle Japanese era, there were only vague records such as "rural dialects are crude". However, since the Late Middle Japanese era, features of regional dialects had been recorded in some books, for example Arte da Lingoa de Iapam, and the recorded features were fairly similar to modern dialects. In these works, recorded by the Christian missionaries in Japan, they regard the true colloquial Japanese as the one used by the court nobles in Kyōto. Other indications for the Kyōto dialect to be considered the standard dialect at that time are glossaries of local dialects that list the Kyōto equivalent for local expressions.

The variety of Japanese dialects developed markedly during the Early Modern Japanese era (Edo period) because many feudal lords restricted the movement of people to and from other fiefs. Some isoglosses agree with old borders of han, especially in Tohoku and Kyushu. Nevertheless, even with the political capital being moved to Edo (i.e. Tōkyō) the status of the Kyōto dialect was not threatened immediately as it was still the cultural and economic center that dominated Japan. This dominance waned as Edo began to assert more political and economic force and made investments in its cultural development. At the end of the eighteenth century the Japanese that was spoken in Edo was regarded as standard as all glossaries from this period use the Edo dialect for local expressions.

In the Meiji period the Tōkyō dialect was assuming the role of a standard dialect that was used between different regions to communicate with each other. The Meiji government set policies in place to spread the concept of 標準語 (hyōjun-go; "standard language"). One of the main goals was to be an equal to the western world and the unification of the language was a part to achieve this. For the hyōjun-go the speech of the Tōkyō middle class served as a model. The Ministry of Education at this time made text books in the new standard language and fostered an inferiority complex in the minds of those who spoke in dialects besides the Tōkyō dialect. One example is a student who was forced to wear a "dialect tag" around the neck. From the 1940s to the 1960s, the period of Shōwa nationalism and the post-war economic miracle, the push for the replacement of regional varieties with Standard Japanese reached its peak.

After World War II, the concept of 共通語 (Kyōtsū-go; "common language") was introduced, which differed from the concept of the standard language insofar that it is heavily influenced by the standard language but it retains dialectal traits. Across Japan, the 'common language' productively used in everyday speech can differ from region to region but it is still mutually intelligible.

Now Standard Japanese has spread throughout the nation, and traditional regional varieties are declining because of education, television, expansion of traffic, urban concentration, etc, in a process known as dialect levelling. However, regional varieties have not been completely replaced with Standard Japanese. The spread of Standard Japanese means the regional varieties are now valued as "nostalgic", "heart-warming" and markers of "precious local identity", and many speakers of regional dialects have gradually overcome their sense of inferiority regarding their natural way of speaking. The contact between regional varieties and Standard Japanese creates new regional speech forms among young people, such as Okinawan Japanese.

== Mutual intelligibility ==
In terms of mutual intelligibility, a survey in 1967 found the four most unintelligible dialects (excluding Ryūkyūan languages and Tohoku dialects) to students from Greater Tokyo are the Kiso dialect (in the deep mountains of Nagano Prefecture), the Himi dialect (in Toyama Prefecture), the Kagoshima dialect and the Maniwa dialect (in the mountains of Okayama Prefecture). The survey is based on recordings of 12- to 20- second long, of 135 to 244 phonemes, which 42 students listened and translated word-by-word. The listeners were all Keio University students who grew up in the Kanto region.

Intelligibility to students from Tokyo and Kanto region (Date: 1967)
Dialect	Osaka City	Kyoto City	Tatsuta, Aichi	Kiso, Nagano	Himi, Toyama	Maniwa, Okayama	Ōgata, Kōchi	Kanagi, Shimane	Kumamoto City	Kagoshima City
Percentage	26.4%	67.1%	44.5%	13.3%	4.1%	24.7%	45.5%	24.8%	38.6%	17.6%

== Classification ==
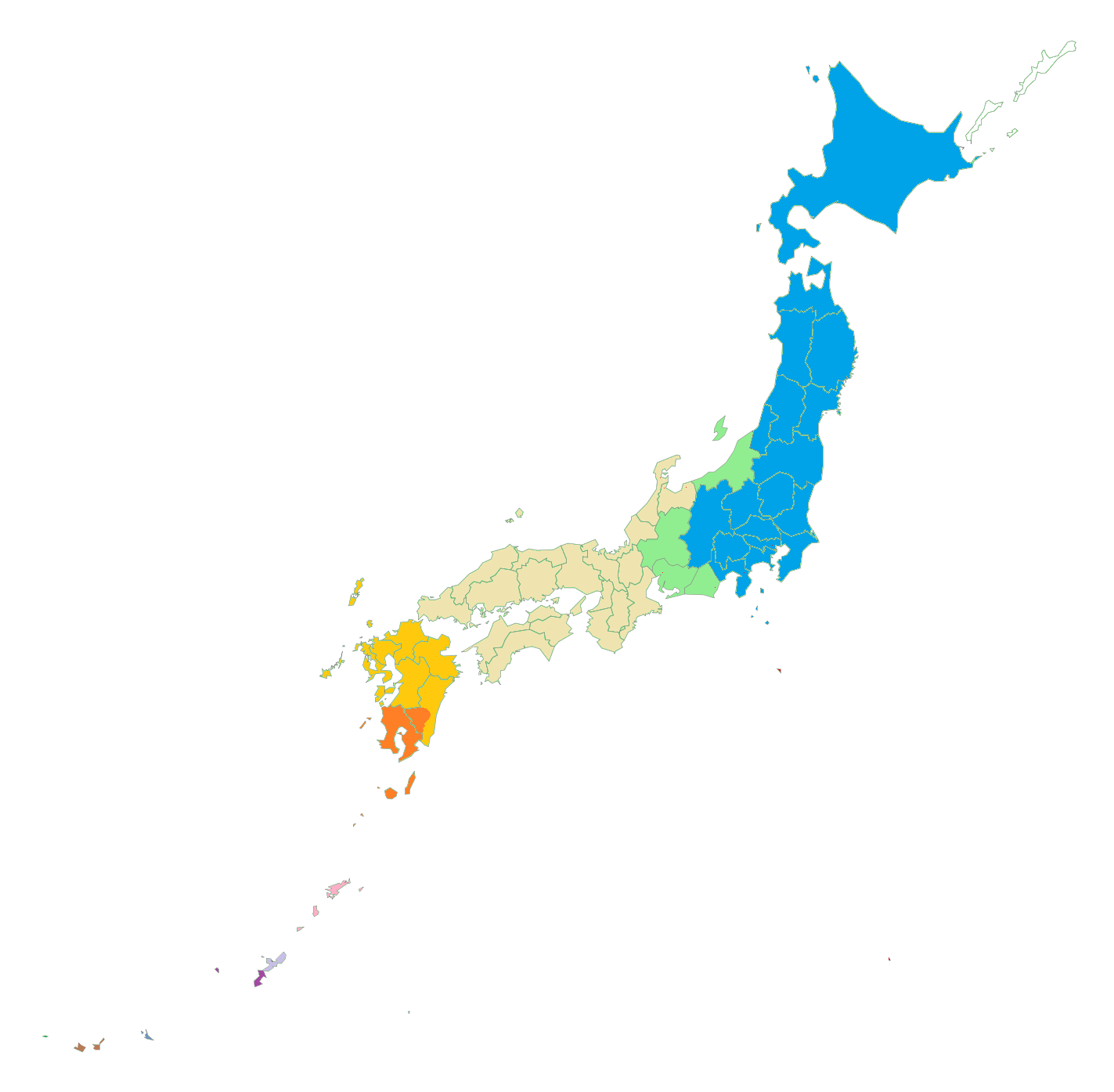
Eastern Japanese dialects are blue, Western Japanese tan. Green dialects have both Eastern and Western features. Kyushu dialects are orange; southern Kyushu is quite distinctive.

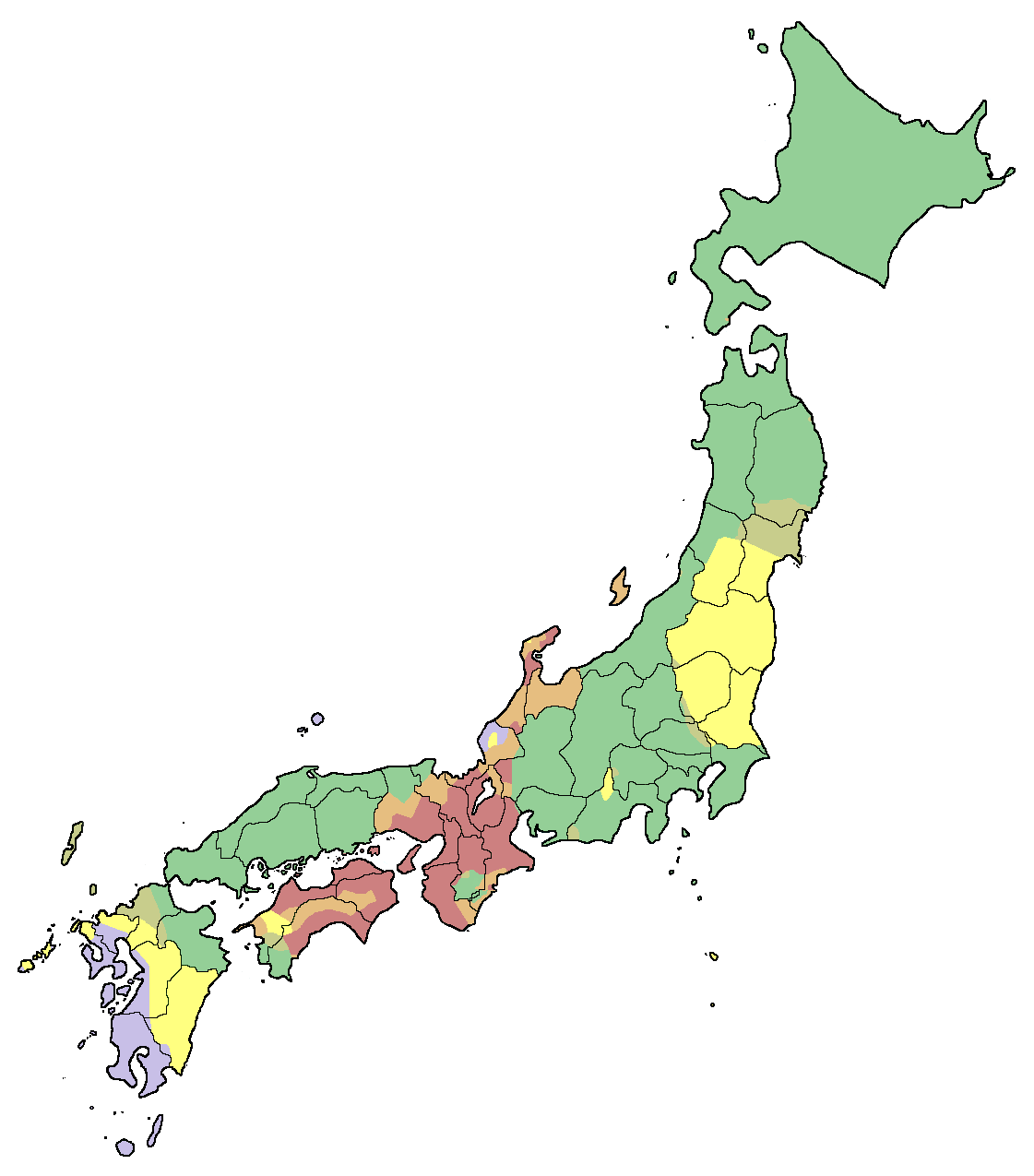
Kyoto type (tone+downstep) Tokyo type (downstep) Map of Japanese pitch-accent types. The divide between Kyoto and Tokyo types is used as the Eastern–Western Japanese boundary in the main map.

There are several generally similar approaches to classifying Japanese dialects. Misao Tōjō classified mainland Japanese dialects into three groups: Eastern, Western and Kyūshū dialects. Mitsuo Okumura classified Kyushu dialects as a subclass of Western Japanese. These theories are mainly based on grammatical differences between east and west, but Haruhiko Kindaichi classified mainland Japanese into concentric circular three groups: inside (Kansai, Shikoku, etc.), middle (Western Kantō, Chūbu, Chūgoku, etc.) and outside (Eastern Kantō, Tōhoku, Izumo, Kyushu, Hachijō, etc.) based on systems of accent, phoneme and conjugation.

=== Eastern and Western Japanese ===
A primary distinction exists between Eastern and Western Japanese. This is a long-standing divide that occurs in both language and culture. Tokugawa points out the distinct eating habits, shapes of tools and utensils. One example is the kind of fish eaten in both areas. While the Eastern region eats more salmon, the West consumes more seabream.

The map in the box at the top of this page divides the two along phonological lines. West of the dividing line, the more complex Kansai-type pitch accent is found; east of the line, the simpler Tokyo-type accent is found, though Tokyo-type accents also occur further west, on the other side of Kansai. However, this isogloss largely corresponds to several grammatical distinctions as well: West of the pitch-accent isogloss:

- The perfective form of -u verbs such as harau 'to pay' is harōta (or minority harota or haruta), showing u-onbin, rather than Eastern (and Standard) haratta
  - The perfective form of -su verbs such as otosu 'to drop' is also otoita in Western Japanese (largely apart from Kansai dialect) vs. otoshita in Eastern
- The imperative of -ru (ichidan) verbs such as miru 'to look' is miyo or mii rather than Eastern miro (or minority mire, though Kyushu dialect also uses miro or mire)
- The adverbial form of -i adjectival verbs such as hiroi 'wide' is hirō (or minority hirū), showing u-onbin, for example hirōnaru (to become wide), rather than Eastern hiroku, for example hirokunaru (to become wide)
- The negative form of verbs is -nu or -n rather than -nai or -nee, and uses a different verb stem; thus suru 'to do' is senu or sen rather than shinai or shinee (apart from Sado Island, which uses shinai)
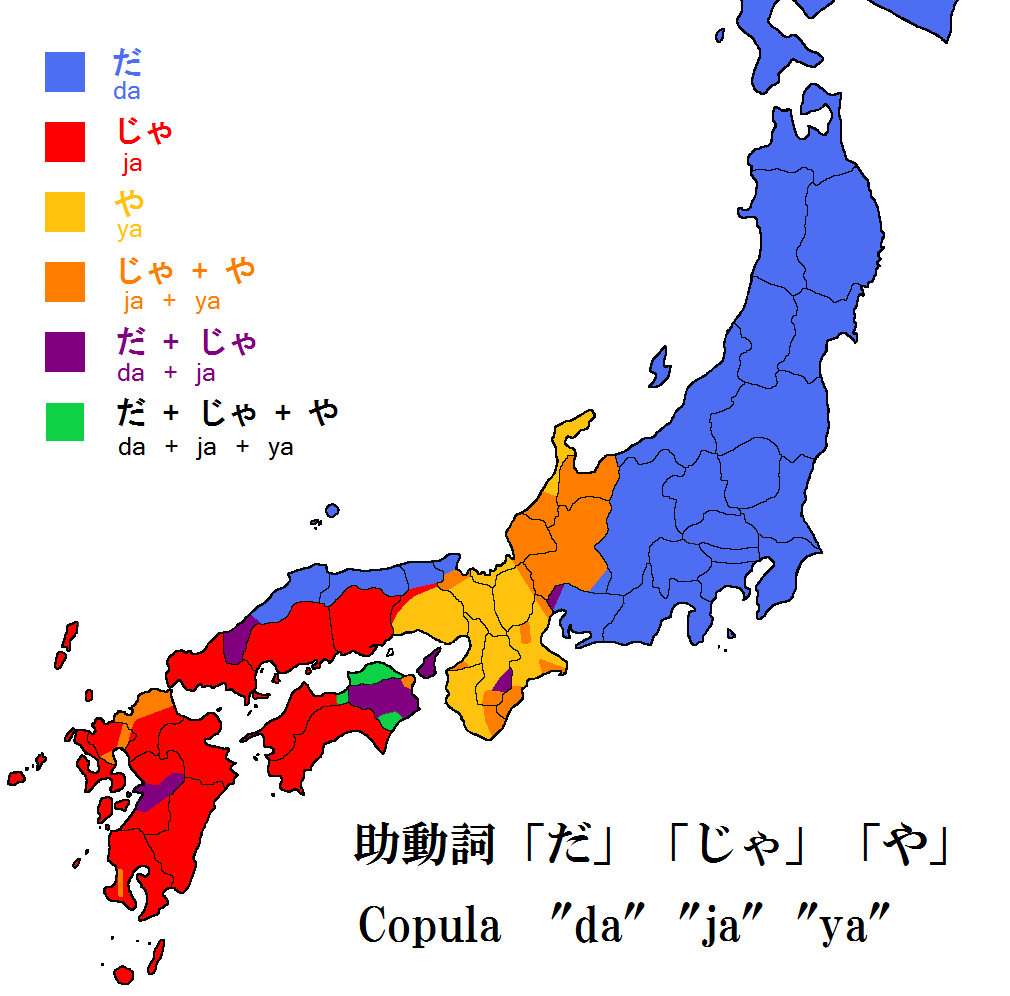
  Copula isoglosses. The blue–orange da/ja divide corresponds to the pitch-accent divide apart from Gifu and Sado. (blue: da, red: ja, yellow: ya; orange and purple: iconically for red+yellow and red+blue; green: all three.)
- The copula is da in Eastern and ja or ya in Western Japanese, though Sado as well as some dialects further west such as San'in use da [see map at right]
- The verb iru 'to exist' in Eastern and oru in Western, though the Wakayama dialect also uses aru and some Kansai and Fukui subdialects use both

While these grammatical isoglosses are close to the pitch-accent line given in the map, they do not follow it exactly. Apart from Sado Island, which has Eastern shinai and da, all of the Western features are found west of the pitch-accent line, though a few Eastern features may crop up again further west (da in San'in, miro in Kyushu). East of the line, however, there is a zone of intermediate dialects which have a mixture of Eastern and Western features. Echigo dialect has harōta, though not miyo, and about half of it has hirōnaru as well. In Gifu, all Western features are found apart from pitch accent and harōta; Aichi has miyo and sen, and in the west (Nagoya dialect) hirōnaru as well: These features are substantial enough that Toshio Tsuzuku classifies Gifu–Aichi dialect as Western Japanese. Western Shizuoka (Enshū dialect) has miyo as its single Western Japanese feature.

The Western Japanese Kansai dialect was the prestige dialect when Kyoto was the capital, and Western forms are found in literary language as well as in honorific expressions of modern Tokyo dialect (and therefore Standard Japanese), such as adverbial ohayō gozaimasu (not *ohayaku), the humble existential verb oru, and the polite negative -masen (not *-mashinai), which uses the Kyoto-style negative ending -n. Because the imperial court, which put emphasis on correct polite speech, was located in Kyoto for a long time, there was greater development of honorific speech forms in Kyoto, which were borrowed into Tokyo speech. Another feature that the modern Tokyo dialect shares with Kyoto is the preservation of the vowel sequences /ai/, /oi/, and /ui/: in Eastern dialects, these tend to undergo coalescence and be replaced by [eː], [eː] and [iː] respectively.} Examples of words that originated in Kyoto and were adopted by Tokyo are yaru ("to give"), kaminari ("thunder") and asatte ("two days from today").

=== Kyushu Japanese ===
Kyushu dialects are classified into three groups, Hichiku dialect, Hōnichi dialect and Satsugu (Kagoshima) dialect, and have several distinctive features:

- as noted above, Eastern-style imperatives miro ~ mire rather than Western Japanese miyo
- ka-adjectives in Hichiku and Satsugu rather than Western and Eastern i-adjectives, as in samuka for samui 'cold', kuyaka for minikui 'ugly' and nukka for atsui 'warm'
- the nominalization and question particle to except for Kitakyushu and Oita, versus Western and Eastern no, as in tottō to? for totte iru no? 'is this taken?' and iku to tai or ikuttai for iku no yo 'I'll go'
- the directional particle sai (Standard e and ni), though Eastern Tohoku dialect use a similar particle sa
- the emphatic sentence-final particles tai and bai in Hichiku and Satsugu (Standard yo)
- a concessive particle batten for dakedo 'but, however' in Hichiku and Satsugu, though Eastern Tohoku Aomori dialect has a similar particle batte
- /e/ is pronounced [je] and palatalizes s, z, t, d, as in mite [mitʃe] and sode [sodʒe], though this is a conservative (Late Middle Japanese) pronunciation found with s, z (sensei [ʃenʃei]) in scattered areas throughout Japan like the Umpaku dialect.
- as some subdialects in Shikoku and Chugoku, but generally not elsewhere, the accusative particle o resyllabifies a noun: honno or honnu for hon-o 'book', kakyū for kaki-o 'persimmon'.
- /r/ is often dropped, for koi 'this' versus Western and Eastern Japanese kore
- vowel reduction is frequent especially in Satsugu and Gotō Islands, as in in for inu 'dog' and kuQ for kubi 'neck'
- Kyushu dialects share some lexical items with Ryukyuan languages, some of which appear to be innovations. Some scholars have proposed that Kyushu dialects and Ryukyuan languages are the same language group within the Japonic family.

Much of Kyushu either lacks pitch accent or has its own, distinctive accent. Kagoshima dialect is so distinctive that some have classified it as a fourth branch of Japanese, alongside Eastern, Western, and the rest of Kyushu.

=== Hachijō Japanese ===
A small group of dialects spoken in Hachijō-jima and Aogashima, islands south of Tokyo, as well as the Daitō Islands east of Okinawa. Hachijō dialect is quite divergent and sometimes thought to be a primary branch of Japanese. It retains an abundance of inherited ancient Eastern Japanese features.

=== Cladogram ===
The relationships between the dialects are approximated in the following cladogram:

- Japanese
  - - Kyūshū
      - Kagoshima
      - Hichiku
      - Hōnichi
    - Western
      - Chūgoku
      - Umpaku
      - Shikoku
      - Kansai
      - Hokuriku
    - Eastern
      - Tōkai–Tōsan
      - - Kantō
        - inland Hokkaidō
      - - Tōhoku
        - coastal Hokkaidō
  - Hachijō

== Theories ==
=== Theory of peripheral distribution of dialectal forms ===
West geographically separated areas seem to have been influenced by Eastern traits. The phonology of Tokyo has influenced Western areas like San'in, Shikoku and Kyushu. Eastern morpho-syntactic and lexical characteristics are also found in the West. These instances cannot be explained as borrowing from the Kyoto speech as Tokyo did because between the regions Eastern traits are not contiguous and there is no evidence that regions had contact with Tokyo. One theory argues that the Eastern type speech was spread all over Japan at the beginning and later Western characteristics developed. The eastward spread was prevented through the geography of Japan that divides East and West that separated the cultures in each of them socio-culturally until this day.

Kunio Yanagita began his discussion for this theory in analysing the local variants for the word "snail". He discovered that the newest words for snail are used in the proximity of Kyoto, the old cultural center, and older forms are found in outer areas. Since the spreading of newer forms of words is slow, older forms are observable in the areas farthest away from the center, creating in effect a situation in which older forms are surrounded by newer forms. His theory in the case of Japan argues that the spread of newer forms happens in a circular pattern with its center being the cultural center. However, this theory can only be true if the characteristics located in peripheral areas are reflections of the historical ones.

=== Origin of Japanese ===
While it is generally accepted that languages in Western Japan are older than the Tokyo dialect, there are new studies that challenge this assumption. For example, there exists a distinction between five word classes in the Osaka-Kyoto dialect while there is no such distinction made in other parts of Japan in the past. Tokugawa argues that it is unlikely that the Osaka-Kyoto speech would be first established and other systems of speech would not be affected by it. Therefore, he states that the Osaka-Kyoto speech created the distinction afterwards. He concludes that either Western Japan accent or the Eastern variant "could be taken the parent of Central Japan accent."

The Kyoto speech seems to rather have conserved its speech while peripheral dialects have made new innovations over time. However, peripheral dialects have features that are reminiscent of historical forms. The language of peripheral areas form linguistic areas of older forms that come from the central language while its phonetics are distinct from the central language. On the other hand, the central area has influenced other dialects by the propagation of innovative forms.

== Dialect articles ==
Dialect	Classification	Location	Map
Akita	Northern Tōhoku	Akita Prefecture	
Amami	Japanese with a strong Ryukyuan influence	Amami Ōshima	
Awaji	Kinki	Awaji Island	
Banshū	Kinki	Southwestern Hyōgo Prefecture	
Bingo	Sanyō, Chūgoku	Eastern Hiroshima Prefecture	
Gunma	West Kantō	Gunma Prefecture	
Hakata	Hichiku, Kyūshū	Fukuoka City	
Hida	Gifu-Aichi, Tōkai-Tōsan	Northern Gifu Prefecture	Hida Region = Brown-yellow area
Hokkaidō	Hokkaidō	Hokkaidō	
Ibaraki	East Kantō / Transitional Tōhoku	Ibaraki Prefecture	
Inshū	East San'in, Chūgoku	Eastern Tottori Prefecture	
Iyo	Shikoku	Ehime Prefecture	
Kaga	Hokuriku	South and central Ishikawa Prefecture	
Kanagawa	West Kantō	Kanagawa Prefecture	
Kesen	Southern Tōhoku	Kesen District, Iwate Prefecture	
Mikawa	Gifu-Aichi, Tōkai-Tōsan	Eastern Aichi Prefecture	
Mino	Gifu-Aichi, Tōkai-Tōsan	Southern Gifu Prefecture	
Nagaoka	Echigo, Tōkai-Tōsan	Central Niigata Prefecture	Green = Nagaoka City
Nagoya	Gifu-Aichi, Tōkai-Tōsan	Nagoya, Aichi Prefecture	Purple area = Nagoya
Nairiku	Southern Tōhoku	Eastern Yamagata Prefecture	
Nambu	Northern Tōhoku	Eastern Aomori Prefecture, northern and central Iwate Prefecture, Kazuno Region of Akita Prefecture	Dark blue area = Nambu
Narada	Nagano-Yamanashi-Shizuoka, Tōkai-Tōsan	Narada, Yamanashi Prefecture	
Ōita	Honichi, Kyūshū	Ōita Prefecture	
Okinawan Japanese	Japanese with Ryukyuan influence.	Okinawa Islands	
Saga	Hichiku, Kyūshū	Saga Prefecture, Isahaya	
Sanuki	Shikoku	Kagawa Prefecture	
Shimokita	Northern Tōhoku	North-Eastern Aomori Prefecture, Shimokita peninsula	Light blue area = Shimokita
Shizuoka	Nagano-Yamanashi-Shizuoka, Tōkai-Tōsan	Shizuoka Prefecture	
Tochigi	East Kantō / Transitional Tōhoku	Tochigi Prefecture (excluding Ashikaga)	
Tōkyō	West Kantō	Tōkyō	
Tosa	Shikoku	Central and eastern Kōchi Prefecture	
Tsugaru	Northern Tōhoku	Western Aomori Prefecture	
Tsushima	Hichiku, Kyūshū	Tsushima Island, Nagasaki Prefecture	

== See also ==
- Yotsugana, the different distinctions of historical *zi, *di, *zu, *du in different regions of Japan
- Okinawan Japanese and Amami Japanese, variants of Standard Japanese influenced by the Ryukyuan languages

== Bibliography ==
- Karimata, Shigehisa (1999). "Onsei no men kara mita Ryūkyū shohōgen". In Gengogaku kenkyūkai (ed.). Kotoba no kagaku 9. Tokyo: Mugi shobō. pp. 13–85.
- Pellard, Thomas (2009). Ōgami: Éléments de description d'un parler du Sud des Ryūkyū [Ōgami: Description of a Southern Ryukyuan language] (Thesis) (in French). Ecole des Hautes Etudes en Sciences Sociales.
- Pellard, Thomas (2015). "The Linguistic archeology of the Ryukyu Islands" (PDF). In Heinrich, Patrick; Miyara, Shinshō; Shimoji, Michinori (eds.). Handbook of the Ryukyuan languages: history, structure, and use. Berlin: De Gruyter Mouton. pp. 13–38. doi:10.1515/9781614511151. ISBN 9781614511618.
- de Boer, Elisabeth (2020), "The classification of the Japonic languages", in Robbeets, Martine; Savelyev, Alexander (eds.), The Oxford Guide to the Transeurasian Languages, Oxford University Press, pp. 40–58, doi:10.1093/oso/9780198804628.003.0005, ISBN 978-0-19-880462-8.
- Shibatani, Masayoshi (2008) [1990]. The languages of Japan (Reprint ed.). Cambridge: Cambridge University Press. p. 197. ISBN 9780521369183.
- Tokugawa, Muneaasa (1972). "Towards a Family Tree for Accent in Japanese Dialects". Journal of Japanese Linguistics. 1 (2): 301–320. doi:10.1515/jjl-1972-0211.
