= Tsushima dialect =

Japanese dialect on Tsushima Island

Tsushima Japanese
- Native to: Japan
- Region: Tsushima Island
- Language family: Japonic: Japanese; Kyūshū Japanese; Hichiku; Tsushima Japanese

Language codes
- ISO 639-3: –
- Glottolog: tsus1237

Tsushima dialect (対馬方言) is a dialect of Japanese spoken on Tsushima Island of Nagasaki Prefecture.

== Classification ==
Despite its mountainous terrain, Tsushima has a relatively homogeneous dialect. The sole exception is Tsutsu at the southern tip of the island. Okumura (1990) assumed wave-like dispersal of new lexical features from Izuhara, Tsushima's politico-cultural center. They appear to have little influence on the geographically isolated community of Tsutsu.

Tsushima's general resemblance to mainland Kyūshū dialects is obvious, but exactly how it has evolved remains an open question. Tsushima is often classified as a Hichiku (northwestern Kyūkyū) dialect, but some Hōnichi (eastern Kyūshū)-like elements are sometimes observed. The Tsushima accent system can be regarded as a variant of the Chikuzen subgroup of Hichiku. However, Okumura (1990) argued that the Tsutsu accent system of Tsushima could hardly have a Chikuzen-like ancestor and was more closely related to the Buzen subgroup of Hōnichi. He questioned the mainstream view of Chikuzen membership because Tsutsu appeared to be more conservative than the rest of Tsushima.

== Vocabulary ==
Although Tsushima attracts folklorists for its preservation of archaic practices, linguists often find the Tsushima dialect uninteresting because Tsushima's vocabulary can usually be found elsewhere in Japan. Words that appear to be specific to Tsushima include wam (round shaped valley) and sae (narrow valley).

The Tsushima dialect was noted for the nearly total lack of Korean influence. Due to Tsushima's geographic proximity and special role in Japanese diplomacy with Korea, linguists used to expect the Tsushima dialect to show some influence from Korean. However, they were unable to test the hypothesis by conducting field work because the access to the island was restricted by the army for its strategic importance. In 1950 and 1951, the Linguistic Society of Japan finally conducted full-scale research together with several other academic societies. They were surprised that Korean had virtually no influence on the Tsushima dialect. All they could find in the northernmost community of Waniura was a couple of Korean loanwords such as yanban ("the rich," from Korean yangban), pē ("ship," from Korean bae) and chonga ("unmarried [Korean] man," from Korean chonggak). They were not nativized but used with clear awareness of their foreign origin. Korean koguma (sweet potato) is likely to have been borrowed from the Tsushima dialect. Sweet potato is called kōkō-imo in southern Kyūshū but is getting closer to the Korean form as it moves toward the north: kōkomo in central-western Tsushima and kogomo in northern Tsushima.
