= Nanbu dialect =

Regional Japanese dialect

- 南部弁
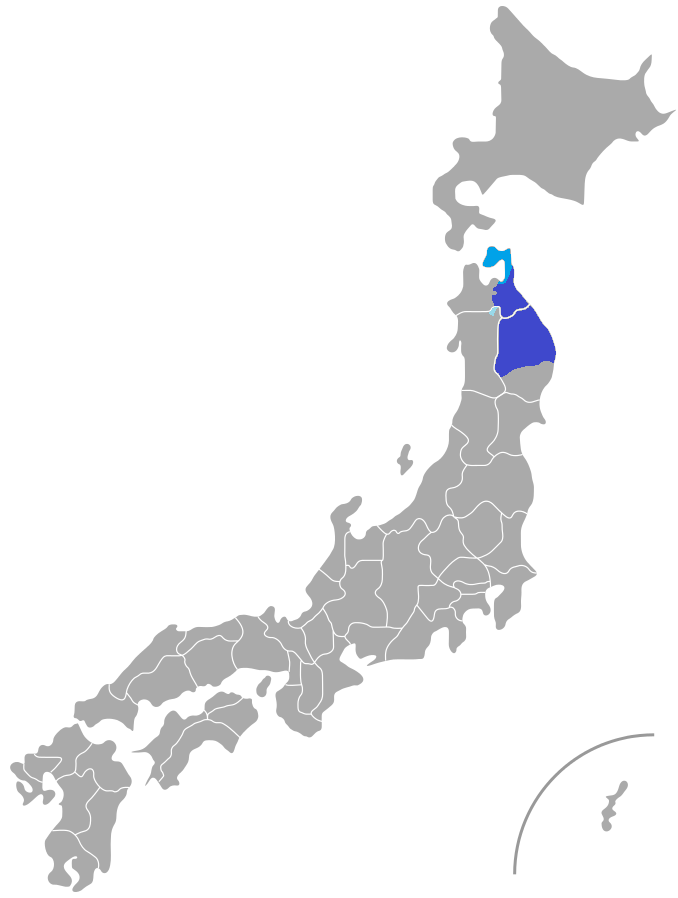
- Extent of the Nanbu dialect, including the sometimes separately treated Shimokita dialect (medium blue) and Kazuno dialect (light blue).
- Native to: Japan
- Region: Tōhoku
- Language family: Japonic: Japanese; Eastern Japanese; Tōhoku; Northern; Nanbu dialect
- Dialects: ◇ Kamikita (Aomori); ◇ Sanpachi (Aomori); ◇ Northern (Iwate); ◇ Central (Iwate); ◇ Coastal (Iwate); ◆ Shimokita*; ◆ Kazuno*

Language codes
- ISO 639-3: –
- Glottolog: namb1295

The Nanbu (or Nambu) dialect (Japanese: 南部弁, Nanbu-ben) is a Japanese dialect spoken in an area corresponding to the former domains of Morioka and Hachinohe in northern Tohoku, governed by the Nanbu clan during the Edo period. It is classified as a Northern Tohoku dialect of the wider Tohoku dialect group.

The Nanbu dialect is spoken across an expansive area covering the eastern half of Aomori Prefecture, the northern and central parts of Iwate Prefecture and the northwestern corner of Akita Prefecture. There is considerable regional variation, owed to factors such as varying degrees of contact with other areas per region, usually dictated by natural barriers and proximity to busy ports. On account of its widespread area, definitions of the ‘Nanbu dialect’ can vary depending on prefecture and speaker, with narrower definitions referring only to the local variety as opposed to the dialect as a whole.

== Spoken area and regional variation ==
=== Aomori Prefecture ===
As a former territory of the Tsugaru clan, the western half of Aomori is home to the Tsugaru dialect, a separate variety to the Nanbu dialect. The remainder of the prefecture was a part of the domains of Morioka and Hachinohe, ruled by the Nanbu clan. This division (between Tsugaru and Nanbu) forms the broadest demarcation of dialects in Aomori Prefecture. There are three sub-dialects of the Nanbu dialect in Aomori, based on former district boundaries. These include:

- The Shimokita dialect, spoken in the former Shimokita District.
- The Kamikita dialect, spoken in the former Kamikita District.
- The Sanpachi dialect, spoken in the former San'nohe District.

Of these, the Shimokita dialect is the most individually distinct, sometimes being classified separately and thus narrowing the definition of the ‘Nanbu dialect’ to just the Kamikita and Sanpachi dialects. Whilst being foundationally Nanbu in most aspects, frequent contact with other regions as a result of shipping in the Mutsu Bay has left elements of the Tsugaru and Hokkaido dialects in its vocabulary, phonology, etc. Additionally, as the population of Shimokita became increasingly urbanised during the 20th century, the growing regional and cultural centre of Hachinohe and its surrounding areas even came to be ascribed its own dialect, the ‘Hachinohe dialect’.

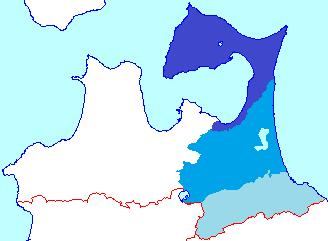
Approximate Nanbu dialect divisions in Aomori Prefecture, with the Shimokita dialect (dark blue), Kamikita dialect (medium blue) and Sanpachi dialect (light blue).

=== Iwate Prefecture ===
Northern and central Iwate Prefecture were formerly a part of the Hachinohe and Morioka domains under the Nanbu clan. Southern Iwate, however, was a part of the Date clan-ruled Sendai and Ichinoseki domains. Consequently, dialects in Iwate Prefecture are separated into a Central-North dialect (part of the Nanbu dialect) which stretches across the former Nanbu Domain area, and a Southern dialect (non-Nanbu dialect) that corresponds to the former Sendai Domain area. The Central-North dialect is a part of the Northern Tohoku dialect group, whilst the Southern dialect belongs to the Southern Tohoku dialect group. Reflecting the naming of the Central-North dialect in the former Nanbu clan territory as the ‘Nanbu dialect’, the Southern dialect of the Date clan territory is sometimes also called the ‘Date dialect’.

When sub-dividing the Central-North Nanbu dialect in Iwate Prefecture, the following three divisions are made.

- Northern dialect - Areas bordering Akita and Aomori prefectures.
- Central dialect - Inland region centred around Morioka.
- Coastal dialect - Coastal region (barring coastal areas of the Northern dialect). Parts of the Southern dialect (former Date Domain) area are also included.

=== Akita Prefecture ===
As a former territory of the Nanbu clan, the Kazuno Region (including Kazuno City and Kosaka) in Akita Prefecture is classified as separate from other dialects in the prefecture.

== Phonology ==
The Nanbu dialect shares various phonetic traits with other Northern Tohoku dialects. Although speakers of Tohoku dialects commonly do not distinguish between the sounds shi (シ) and su (ス), chi (チ) and tsu (ツ) and ji (ジ) and zu (ズ), in the Coastal dialect of Iwate Prefecture a distinction is made. In this article, the characteristic Tohoku dialect nasalisation that occurs before voiced mora will be denoted with a n (^{ん}).

The Nanbu dialect has a gairin (外輪 ‘outer rim’) Tokyo standard pitch accent (or close variation thereof). Pitch rises on a single mora, like in atama ga (あたまが head...), compared to atama ga (あたまが) in Tokyo. As a general rule, fourth- and fifth-class two-mora nouns have a rising first mora (ame (あめ rain)). In areas such as Morioka and central Iwate however, if the second mora of such words contains a wide vowel (a, e, o) they may have a rising final mora, like in ito (いと string, yarn). In turn, this type of change does not occur in areas like Hachinohe or the Sanriku Kaigan coastal area.

== Grammar and syntax ==
=== Inflection ===
==== Verbs ====
Verb inflection is essentially identical to standard Japanese, save for a few exceptions. For Godan verbs, the standard volitional form ~shiyo (~しよう) is replaced with be (べ) or be (べえ). For example, kako (書こう lets write) becomes kaku be (書くべ). In Iwate Prefecture, certain archaic hypothetical forms remain in use. For example, kakeba (書けば if I write) can become either kagenba (かげ^{ん}ば) or the more antiquated kaganba (かが^{ん}ば). Likewise, okireba (起きれば if/when I wake up) becomes ogirenba (おぎれ^{ん}ば) or the archaic ogiranba (おぎら^{ん}ば). In Ashiro and other parts of north-west Iwate and Aomori, the u-ending (former) yodan verb kau (買う to buy) changes to a ru-ending (karu (かる)). The plain form of the irregular verb suru (する to do) can be either shi (し), su (す), suru (する) or shiru (しる), although shi and su tend to be most common. The negative form of suru, shinai (しない do not), may become either shinea (しねぁ) or sanea (さねぁ), whilst the hypothetical form sureba (すれば if I do) typically becomes senba (せ^{ん}ば) (or henba (へ^{ん}ば) in Aomori). Lastly, the imperative form of suru, shiro (しろ do (command)), becomes se (せ).

==== Adjectives ====
Examples of i-adjectives having their inflection affected by diphthong merging can be seen in the Nanbu dialect. For example, the diphthong ai merges to a ɛ ('eh'), so that the plain form of takai (高い tall, high) becomes tageh (たげぁ). In some areas, the connective form is also affected, resulting in tagehguneh (たげぁぐねぁ) (takakunai (高くない is not tall) and tagehgatta (たげぁがった) (takakatta (高かった was tall). In areas where diphthong merging does not occur on the connective form, tagakuneh (たがくねぁ) and tagagatta (たががった) are used instead. Unlike in the Tsugaru dialect, which uses -kuteatta (-くてあった) for the past tense form of adjectives, the Nanbu dialect shares the standard Japanese inflection -katta (-かった). The particle be can attach to i-adjectives either directly onto the plain form (Example: agehbe (あげぁべ) = akai daro (赤いだろう it's red, right?)) or onto the archaic -gari (カリ) inflection (Example: akakanbe (あかかんべ)). -Ba (-ば) attaches directly onto the hypothetical form of adjectives, like in suzushinba (すずし^{ん}ば if it is cool). In Aomori, the inflection style [stem form + kara (から)] may also be used (Example: kanasu-kara (かなすから if (I am) sad) = kanashikereba (悲しければ).

Depending on area, the attributive form of na-adjectives can be either -na (-な) like in shizuga na mori (静がな森 a quiet forest), or -da (-だ) such as in shizuga da mori (静がだ森). For the hypothetical form, -ndara (-^{ん}だら), like in shizugandara (静が^{ん}だら if it’s quiet), is used in Aomori whilst the form -ndaranba (-^{ん}だら^{ん}ば), such as in shizugandaranba (静が^{ん}だら^{ん}ば) is used in Iwate. -ndaranba can also be said as -ndanba (^{ん}だ^{ん}ば).

=== Particles ===
Several forms exist for expressing possibility in the Nanbu dialect. The first is similar to the standard form (example: kageru (書げる can write)), the second is to attach ni-ii (にいい) or ni-ee (にええ) to the plain form of verbs, like in yomu ni-ii (読むにいい can read) and the third is to attach -eru (える) to the -nai stem, such as in yomaeru (読まえる also can read). To express causation, -seru (-せる) attaches to the -nai stem of verbs, like in kagaseru (かがせる make write) (kakaseru (書かせる)). To express a ‘self-occurring’ (or ‘passive’) action, -saru (-さる) is attached to the -nai stem of verbs (Example: kagasaru (書がさる got/was written).

As also mentioned above, the volition and conjecture-expressing particle be (べ) can be found in the Nanbu dialect, and attaches to the plain form of verbs and adjectives. For example, ogirube (おぎるべえ lets get up/will they get up?). For Ichidan verbs, be sometimes attaches to the stem form (ogibee (おぎべえ)), whilst for i-adjectives be can also attach to the -karu (-かる) form (sunzushiganbee (す^{ん}ずしがんべえ)). For conjecture, gotta (ごった) (ex. furugotta (降るごった) = furu daro (降るだろう)) is sometimes used, with yonta (よんた), mitta (みった) and yotta (よった) also used in Aomori. Gotta is unique to the Nanbu dialect, and is not used in neighbouring dialects like the Akita (excluding Kazuno) or Tsugaru dialect.

For past tense, in Iwate Prefecture -tatta (たった) is used to reminiscently express something personally experienced or observed (Example: kaidatta (書いだった I wrote)). In contrast, -takke (たっけ) is used for past facts heard through hearsay.

=== Case-marking particles・Binding particles ===
The nominative case-marking particle ga (が) and binding particle wa (は) are normally omitted in the Nanbu dialect. The accusative particle o (を) is also commonly omitted, but in cases of emphasis ba (ば) and goto (ごど) are sometimes used. Sa (さ) is commonly used as an equivalent to ni (に) in standard Japanese.

=== Conjunctions ===
For resultatives that express reason, in the Nanbu Region of Aomori suke/shike (すけ/しけ) is mainly used, whilst sute/shite (すて/して) and hende (へんで) are used in Shimokita and San’nohe, respectively. Suke/shike (すけ/しけ) and sute/shite (すて/して) are variant forms of sakai (さかい) in the Kinki dialects. Aside from the predominantly used kara (から), in northern Iwate honte (はんて), hede (へで) and sukee (すけえ) are also used, whilst dasu (だす) is used in central areas.

For adversatives equivalent to keredo (けれど), domo (ども) is used predominantly from North-Central Iwate to the Aomori Nanbu Region, whilst tate (たて), tatte (たって), bate (ばて) and batte (ばって) are used in Shimokita. Domo is widely used in Northern Tohoku dialects, whilst batte is shared with the Tsugaru dialect and tatte is unique to Shimokita.

For hypothetical resultatives, in addition to -ba (ば), dara (だら) and gottara (ごったら) are sometimes attached to the plain form of verbs and adjectives.

(Example) omae mo kagu- (-dara / -gottara), ore mo kagu (おまえもかぐだら（かぐごったら・かがば）おれもかぐ = if you're going to write, so am I) = omae mo kaku no naraba watashi mo kaku (お前も書くのならば私も書く).

=== Sentence-ending expressions ===
The sentence-ending and interjectory particle na (な) is used in Iwate by both sexes. In North-Central Iwate, women use nahan (なはん) to express closeness with the listener, whilst the polite expression nassu (なっす) is used by both men and women. The particles na (な) and ne (ね) are used in Aomori, becoming polite if su (す) or shi (し) is attached to them. Nesu (ねす) is used in inland parts of the Nanbu Region in Aomori, with a tendency to change to nehsu (ねぁす), whilst nasu (なす) is found from the coastal area around Hachinohe to Iwate Prefecture. A variant form of nasu, nasa (なさ) is used by women in Hachinohe, whilst nisu (にす) or nusu (ぬす) is said in Shimokita.

=== Polite expressions ===
Among the older generation in Aomori Prefecture, the polite forms odehru (おでぁる to come) (equivalent to oide ni naru (おいでになる) and okeeriaru (おけぇりある to go home) (equivalent to o-kaeri ni naru (お帰りになる)) are used. Various equivalent forms to the imperative ~shite kudasai (~ してください please do ~ ) are used among older speakers in the Nanbu dialect. These include: o ~ are (お~あれ), -see (-せぇ) (widely used in the Sanpachi and Kamikita dialects), the moderately polite -te (て) (used in San’nohe), o ~ anse (お…あんせ) and the highly respectful -nasee (-なせぇ). In parts of Shimokita like Tanabu and Ohata, there are three levels of politeness, expressed with -see (-せぇ) (moderately polite), -sai (-さい) (polite) and -samae (-さまえ) (most polite).
