= Mino dialect =

Japanese dialect

- Native to: Japan
- Region: southern Gifu
- Language family: Japonic: Japanese; Eastern Japanese; Tōkai–Tōsan; Gifu–Aichi; Mino dialect

Language codes
- ISO 639-3: –
- Glottolog: mino1244

The location of Mino Province in Japan, ca. 1861. This is the general area in which the Mino dialect is spoken.

The Mino dialect (美濃弁, Mino-ben) is a Japanese dialect spoken in the southern area, made up of the former area known as Mino Province, of Gifu Prefecture, Japan. It is also referred to as the Tōnō dialect (東濃弁 Tōnō-ben) by residents of the Tōnō region of the prefecture, which is the eastern part of the former province. It is sometimes also referred to as the Gifu dialect (岐阜弁 Gifu-ben), but that can sometimes include Hida dialect, which is in the northern part of Gifu Prefecture.

Generally speaking, it has many words and grammatical structures that are shared with other nearby dialects, such as the Nagoya and Mikawa dialects in neighboring Aichi Prefecture. However, it also shares features with the Kansai dialect.

== Grammar ==
Up until the Taishō period, the Mino dialect used ja (じゃ) for copulas and adjectival nouns, and the Mino dialect was occasionally referred to as a "ja-language in Mino" (美濃のじゃ言葉 Mino no ja-kotoba). However, because of the influence of the Kansai dialect, the modern Mino dialect generally uses ya (や) and is compared to the Nagoya dialect which uses da (だ) for copulas and adjectival nouns.

Standard Japanese emphasizes copulas with yo, such as da yo (だよ), but the Mino dialect attaches te (て) to the ya copula, leading to emphases such as ya te (やて).

The main difference between verbs in the Mino dialect and in standard Japanese is seen in the negative form. The verb "to eat" (食べる taberu) is written as tabenai (食べない) as a negative in standard Japanese. In the Mino dialect, nai is replaced by n (ん) or hen (へん), leading to forms such as taben (食べん) or tabehen (食べへん). The verb "to go" would similarly be written in the negative form as ikan (行かん) or ikahen (行かへん).

== Pronunciation ==
The Mino dialect elides the intervocalic /ɴ/ in the sequences an'i and en'i; the first vowel is lengthened, becoming aai and eei, respectively. For example, 満員 and 全員 are read as man'in and zen'in in standard Japanese, but can be read as maain and zeein in the Mino dialect.

The traditional accent pattern for the Mino dialect follow similar patterns to the Tokyo accent, though some of the western areas around Tarui and Sekigahara also show influences from the nearby Kansai accent pattern. Because major cities like Ōgaki and Gifu have many commuters from the surrounding area, modern youth have lost the traditional accent for the dialect.

== Examples ==
Below is a list of example words for the Mino dialect:

Mino dialect	Standard Japanese	English	Lexical category
omoroi (おもろい)	omoshiroi (面白い)	interesting	adjective
kashiwa (かしわ)	toriniku (鶏肉)	chicken (meat)	noun
bii (びい)	onna no ko (女の子), musume (娘)	girl, daughter	noun
bō (ぼう)	otoko no ko (男の子), musuko (息子)	boy, son	noun
watchi (わっち)	watashi (私)	I, me	pronoun
mawashi (まわし)	junbi (準備), shitaku (支度)	preparation	noun/verb
shiru (しる)	suru (する)	do	verb
chau (ちゃう)	chigau (違う)	be different/wrong	verb
tsure (つれ)	tomodachi (友達), shiriai (知り合い)	friend, acquaintance	noun
doerai (どえらい)	sugoku (すごく)	very	adverb
deeree (でーれぇー)	sugoku (すごく)	very	adverb
yattokame (八十日目)	hisashiburi (久しぶり)	long time	adjective
tanto (たんと)	takusan (たくさん)	many, much	adjective
gabari (画針)	gabyō (画鋲)	pushpin, thumbtack	noun
kiinai (きいない)	kiiro no (黄色の)	yellow (color)	adjective
gebo (ゲボ)	ōto (嘔吐)	vomit	noun
-nta (～んた)	-tachi (～たち), -ra (～ら)	pluralization	suffix
naburu (なぶる)	sawaru (触る)	touch	verb

== Famous persons using Mino dialect ==
- Yuriko Osada (長田 百合子 Osada Yuriko)
- Yoko Kumada (speaks standard Japanese, but uses the Mino dialect on some programs)

== See also ==
- Japanese dialects
