= Hokuriku dialects =

Japanese dialect

Hokuriku Japanese
- Native to: Japan
- Region: Hokuriku
- Language family: Japonic: Japanese; Western Japanese; Hokuriku Japanese

Language codes
- ISO 639-3: –
- Glottolog: hoku1242
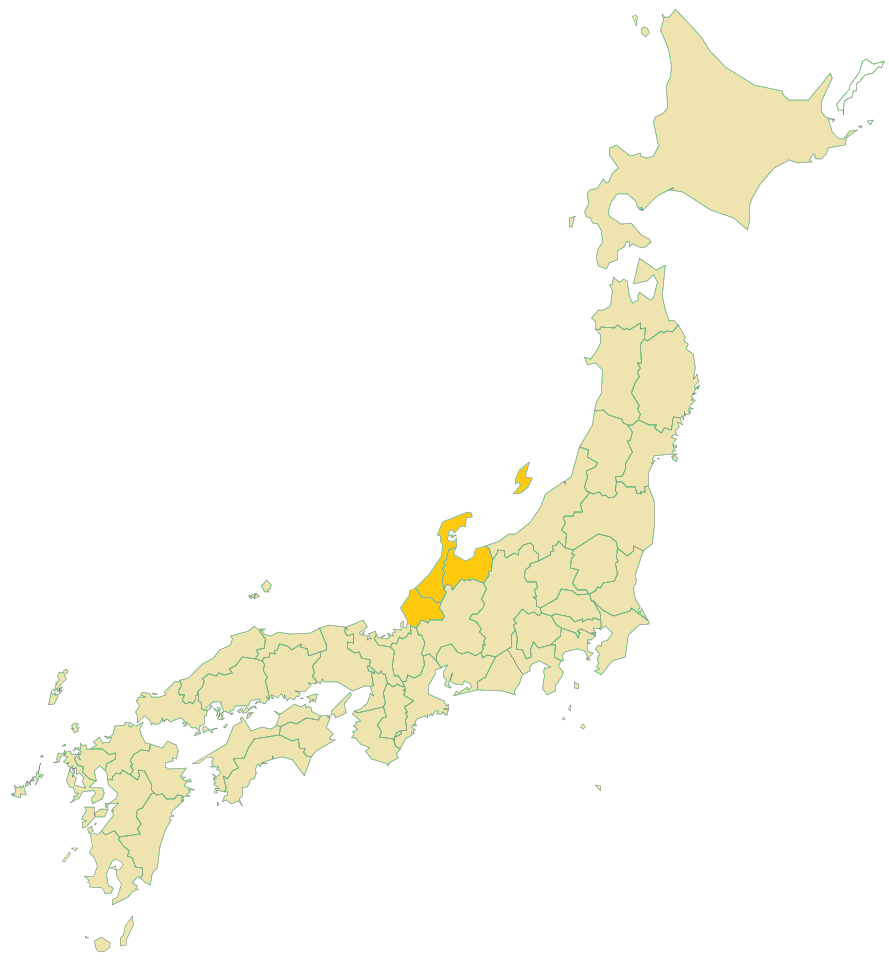
- Hokuriku dialect

The Hokuriku dialect (北陸方言, Hokuriku hōgen) is a Japanese dialect group spoken in Hokuriku region, consists of northern Fukui Prefecture, Ishikawa Prefecture, Toyama Prefecture, and Sado Island in Niigata Prefecture. Mainland Niigata dialect is classified into Tōkai-Tōsan dialect and Tōhoku dialect and southern Fukui dialect is classified into Kansai dialect.

== Dialects ==
- Kaga dialect (southern Ishikawa Prefecture, formerly known as Kaga Province)
  - Kanazawa dialect (Kanazawa)
- Noto dialect (northern Ishikawa Prefecture, formerly known as Noto Province)
- Toyama dialect or Etchū dialect (Toyama Prefecture, formerly known as Etchū Province)
- Fukui dialect (northern Fukui Prefecture, formerly known as Echizen Province except Tsuruga)
- Sado dialect (Sado Island, Niigata Prefecture)

== Phonology ==
In Hokuriku dialect, vowels at the end of monomoraic nouns often lengthen as well as Kansai dialect, while vowel reduction frequently occurs as well as Eastern Japanese including Standard Japanese.

Some phonetic features are close to Tōhoku dialect. The high vowels "i" and "u" are sometimes pronounced central vowels. "shi" and "su", "chi" and "tsu", "ji" and "zu" are confused in Sado, Toyama, Noto dialects. "i" and "e" are also confused in Toyama and Noto dialects.

In Hokuriku region, various pitch accents can be heard. Varieties of Kyoto-Osaka type accent are heard in Sado, Toyama and eastern Fukui such as Katsuyama and Ōno. In Izumi, easternmost village of Fukui, Tokyo type accent is heard. In central Fukui such as Fukui city and Echizen, a monotonous accent is heard - there is no contrast between words based on pitch accent. In Noto, varieties of Kyoto-Osaka type, monotonous accent and Tokyo type accent are heard to each village. In Kaga and part of Fukui, an intermediate accent between Tokyo type and Kyoto-Osaka type is heard.

Except for Sado dialect, intonation in pause of phase is often undulated.

== Grammar ==
Many grammatical features are common to other Western Japanese dialects and see Japanese dialects#Eastern and Western Japanese. Special features of Hokuriku dialect are follows:

- In Toyama and Ishikawa, the nominalization and question particle no is replaced with ga.
- Except for Sado, the interrogative particle ke is used as well as ka.
- Except for Sado, the sentence-final particle ma is added to imperative sentences.
- In Sado, Toyama and Noto, the emphatic sentence-final particle cha is used.

== Regional differences ==
=== Fukui ===
The dialects of Fukui Prefecture are Fukui dialect (福井弁, Fukui-ben) spoken in the northern part, and the Wakasa dialect (若狭弁, Wakasa-ben) spoken in the southern part. Because Fukui is close to Kansai on the south, Wakasa-ben resembles Kansai-ben closely, while Fukui-ben exhibits changes in pronouncing the sounds of words to make the pronunciation more convenient.

Fukui dialect	Standard Japanese	English meaning (rough translation)
ほやほや (hoyahoya)	そうだそうだ (soodasooda)	"Yes," or "That's true."
つるつるいっぱい (tsurutsuruippai)		used when a cup is very full, almost overflowing
もつけねー (motsukenee)	ざんねん（ですね）(zannen) (desune)	"That's too bad."
てきねー (tekinee)	きぶんがわるい (kibungawarui)	"I don't feel good."
ぎょうさん (gyoosan)	たくさん (takusan)	many
おおきに (ookini)	ありがとう (arigatoo)	"Thank you."
きんの (kinno)	きのう (kinoo)	yesterday
ものごい (monogoi) or えらい (erai)	つらい (tsurai)	painful
ねまる (nemaru)	すわる (suwaru)	sit down
おぞい (ozoi)	ふるい (furui) or よくない (yokunai)	old, or not good
じゃみじゃみ (jamijami)	すなあらし (sunaarashi)	TV static (onomatopoeia)
てなわん (tenawan)	いじわるい (ijiwarui) or やんちゃな (yanchana)	naughty or mischievous
えん (en)	いない (inai)	is not (people or animals only)
もたもた (motamota)	ぐずぐず (guzuguzu)	slowly
よさり (yosari)	よる (yoru)	night
なげる (nageru)	すてる (suteru)	throw away
おとましい (otomashii)	もったいない (mottainai)	wasteful

=== Ishikawa ===
The dialects of Ishikawa Prefecture are Kaga dialect (加賀弁, Kaga-ben), spoken in the southern part, and the Noto dialect (能登弁, Noto-ben), spoken in the northern part. Kaga-ben has the Kanazawa dialect (金沢弁, Kanazawa-ben) spoken in Kanazawa and the Shiramine dialect (白峰弁, Shiramine-ben), also Gige dialect (ジゲ弁, Gige-ben) spoken in Shiramine, a village at the foot of Mount Haku. Kanazawa is a capital of Ishikawa, so Kanazawa-ben is an influential dialect.

The most famous phrase in Kanazawa-ben is the soft imperative suffix -masshi (～まっし), meaning -nasai (～なさい) in standard Japanese. This phrase is often used in catch phrases for visitors of Kanazawa, for example, Kimasshi Kanazawa! (来まっし、金沢! Come to Kanazawa!).

Recent works on Kanazawa-ben

- Savage, Colin (2009). 金沢弁の本 - The Dialect of Kanazawa. London (UK) and Los Angeles (USA): Lulu Publishing Inc.

=== Toyama ===
The dialect of Toyama is called Toyama dialect (富山弁, Toyama-ben) or Etchu dialect (越中弁, Etchu-ben) and consists of West (Gosei, 呉西), East (Gotō, 呉東) and Gokayama.

Instead of the colloquial shitte iru ka? (知っているか？ Do you know?), speakers of the Toyama-ben will ask, shittokke? (知っとっけ？).

When expressing that something is incorrect, instead of saying the standard phrase iie (いいえ), users of the dialect will say naan (なあん), with a rising tone.

Other regional distinctions include words like kitokito (キトキト fresh or delicious) and ikiiki (イキイキ energetic).

Other features : "kore" (これ "this")/"ka" or "ko", "sore" (それ "that")/"sa" or "so".

Toyama-ben speakers sometimes put "ze" instead of "ne" at the end of the sentence.
