= Ōita dialect =

Japanese dialect spoken in Ōita Prefecture

- Native to: Japan
- Region: Ōita Prefecture
- Language family: Japonic: Japanese; Kyushu Japanese; Hōnichi; Ōita dialect

Language codes
- ISO 639-3: –
- Glottolog: oita1237
- IETF: ja-u-sd-jp44

Ōita dialect (大分方言, Ōita-hōgen), commonly called Ōita-ben (大分弁), is a dialect of Japanese spoken in Ōita Prefecture in Kyushu, Japan. Even within the prefecture, regional differences are still prevalent; for example, vocabulary within the Hita and Nakatsu regions tends to differ from that used in other regions of Ōita.

== Outline ==
Ōita-ben has been strongly influenced by dialects from the Chūgoku region of Japan. For example, compared to other dialects within Kyushu, the sentence-final particle tai, the contradictory conjunction batten, and the secondary substantive particle to are rarely used. However, the word endings -tcha (emphasizing) and -ken (explanatory) are frequently used.

== Grammar ==
=== Potential forms of verbs ===
Apart from the younger generation's tendency to skip the ra when forming some standard Japanese potential verbs ("ra"-removed words), the Ōita-ben usage is considered a fairly old custom. For example: The potential form of miru being pronounced mireru instead of mirareru.

In addition, there are three forms of potential verbs in Ōita-ben, depending on whether the potential is objective, subjective, or related to personal ability.

1. taberaruru – An objective potential form; for example, because something hasn’t gone rotten, you can eat it. The negative potential is taberaren.
2. tabereru – A subjective potential form; for example, because you aren’t full yet, you can eat it. The negative potential is taberen.
3. tabekiru – A potential form that relates to personal ability; for example, others might not be able to eat it because they dislike it, but you can eat it. The negative potential is tabekiran.

=== -yoru and -choru ===
In general, -yoru refers to the progression or continuation of an action or occurrence, while -choru refers to the completion, continuation, or result of a condition or status. They are common in many western Japanese dialects. -yoru can change to -yon, while -choru can change to -chon as well.

1. “Sakki kara ame ga furiyoru naa.” – For some time, it has been (and is still currently) raining.
2. “Itsun ma ni ka ame ga futchoru naa.” - I wasn't aware it had been raining (it is already clearing up).

=== Word endings and connectives ===
1. -tcha – attached to the ends of words for emphasis. For example, “Chigau tcha! Ore wa yatchoran ccha!” which becomes “Chigau tte! Ore wa yatte nai tte!” in standard Japanese, means “No! I didn't do it!”
2. -tchi – equivalent to the standard Japanese word ending -tte, it is used to quote something that was said or that you heard from someone else. Sometimes sounds like -tchie. For example, “Ano futari kekkon shita tchie”, which becomes “Ano futari kekkon shita tte yo” in standard Japanese, means “I heard those two got married.”

- -tchi is used not only in Ōita-ben, but is also heard in the Kitakyushu and Kurume regions. However, in Ōita-ben there is a strong trend for other te sounds (aside from the conjunctive particle te) to change to a chi sound.

- “Chotto kiichi kuri”, which becomes “Chotto kiite kure” in standard Japanese, roughly translates to “Listen to me.”
- “Matchi kuri”, which becomes “Matte kure” in standard Japanese, translates to “Wait for me.”

1. -ni – similar to the da yo found in standard Japanese. For example, “Mada shukudai shite nai ni”, which becomes “Mada shukudai shite nain da yo” in standard Japanese, means “I haven’t done my homework yet.”
2. -ya ni – almost the same as the plain -ni. For example, “Anta no koto ga suki ya ni”, which becomes “Anata no koto ga suki nan da yo” in standard Japanese, means “I like you.”
3. -ken – equivalent to the standard kara meaning “because”, this is widely used across Kyushu.
4. sogee, dogee, kogee, agee – the Ōita-ben equivalents of sonna, donna, konna, anna
5. -kae – can be either the standard Japanese question particle kai or a substitute for the “Please do...” / ...shinasai form. However, this ending is falling out of use with the younger generation.

- ”Genki kae?” which becomes “Genki kai?” in standard Japanese, translates to “Are you well?”
- ”Tsukattara chanto naosan kae”, which becomes “Tsukattara chanto katazukenasai” in standard Japanese, translates roughly to “If you use it, clean up properly when you’re done.”

=== Usage ===
==== Verbs ====
- Irregular conjugation of verbs ending in -nu remains in Ōita-ben. This table shows the conjugations for different tenses of the verbs shinu (死ぬ) and inu (往ぬ). Inu is not used in standard Japanese.

Basic form	Dialect	Conjugated form					
Basic form	Dialect	Imperfective	Continuative	Predicative	Attributive	Hypothetical	Imperative
shinu, inu	Standard Japanese	-na	-ni	-nu	-nu	-ne	-ne
shinu, inu	Ōita-ben	-na	-ni	-nuru	-nuru	-nura	-ne, -niyo
shinu, inu	Old Japanese	-na	-ni	-nu	-nuru	-nure	-ne

- The conjugation of kami/shimo nidan (上／下二段) verbs from Old Japanese still remains in Ōita-ben. However, the predicative takes the same form as the attributive. This table shows the conjugations for the verbs mieru (見える), miyu (見ゆ, old Japanese only), reru (れる), and ru (る, old Japanese only).

Basic form	Dialect	Conjugated form					
Basic form	Dialect	Imperfective	Continuative	Predicative	Attributive	Hypothetical	Imperative
mieru	Standard Japanese	-e	-e	-eru	-eru	-ere	-ero, -eyo
mieru	Ōita-ben	-e	-e	-yuru	-yuru	-yure	-ero, -eyo
miyu	Old Japanese	-e	-e	-yu	-yuru	-yure	-eyo
reru	Standard Japanese	re	re	reru	reru	rere	rero, reyo
reru	Ōita-ben	re	re	ruru	ruru	rure	rero, reyo
ru	Old Japanese	re	re	ru	ruru	rure	reyo

- The conjugation of kami/shimo ichidan (上／下一段) verbs from standard Japanese has become mixed with the conjugation of godan (五段) verbs in Ōita-ben. This table shows the conjugation for the verb miru (見る).

Basic form	Dialect	Conjugated form					
Basic form	Dialect	Imperfective	Continuative	Predicative	Attributive	Hypothetical	Imperative
miru	Standard Japanese	mi	mi	miru	miru	mire	mire, miyo
miru	Ōita-ben	mira	mi	miru	miru	mira	mire, miyo

==== Adjectives ====
Keiyōshi change form depending on the vowel before the final i. The two vowels combine into one elongated sound.

1. ai → ee; for example, karai (spicy) → karee
2. ui → ii; for example, akarui (bright) → akarii
3. oi → ii or ee; for example, kuroi (black) → kurii or kuree

== Sounds and phonemes ==
- In contrast to standard Japanese, there are no velar nasal sounds in Ōita-ben.
- Like the -to itte → -chi iuchi → -chuchi transformation, it is common for words to contract and become palatised sounds for ease when speaking quickly.

toshi wo totte → toshu totchi
nani wo itte iru no → nan, iiyon no kae, nan iiyon no ka nou, or nanyou iiyon no kae

- Liaison of consonants is common, for example mikan wa → mikanna.

=== Euphonic changes ===
Oita-ben employs euphonic changes often during rapid speech.

==== Euphonic changes that differ from standard Japanese ====
- u euphonic changes
1. -u verbs: omotta (thought) → omoota; sorotta (gathered) → soroota. When the vowel preceding the u is an a, it changes to an o: katta (bought) → koota; moratta (received) → moroota
2. -bu and -mu verbs: asonda (played) → asooda; yonda (read) → yooda. This change is falling out of use with the younger generation.
3. Keiyōshi: akakute (red) → akoote; takakute (high, expensive) → takoote
- i euphonic changes
1. -su verbs: sashita (raised, pointed) → saita; kashita (lent) → kaita. When the vowel preceding the su is an o, it changes to an i: nokoshita (left over) → nokiita; modoshita → mojiita (returned). This change is also falling out of use with the younger generation.

=== Accent ===
Words in Ōita-ben are accented according to a slight variation of the Tokyo dialect’s pitch accent. The western Hita region, while still considered to utilize the pitch accent of the Tokyo dialect, has some minor differences in intonation, while areas close to the inland Kumamoto and Miyazaki Prefectures sometimes utilize the “no accent” pitch that is characteristic of those prefectures.

==== Words with accents that differ from standard Japanese ====
In this list, the left side is the standard intonation, while the right is the Ōita-ben intonation. The accented part is in bold.

- **ya** : ya (arrow)
- **o**no : o**no** (axe)
- **ku**mo : ku**mo** (cloud)
- fu**ku** : **fu**ku (clothes)
- no**mi** : **no**mi (flea)
- a**ida** : a**ida** (space, interval) – in the standard intonation, the tone is actually closer to monotone, while Ōita-ben emphasizes the latter half of the word
- a**bura** : **a**bura (oil)
- **a**wabi : a**wa**bi (abalone)
- i**tachi** : i**ta**chi (weasel)
- ka**wara** : **ka**wara (roof tile)
- ki**mono** : ki**mo**no (kimono)
- **ki**njo : ki**njo** (neighborhood)
- se**naka** : se**na**ka (back)
- ta**suki** : **ta**suki (a sash, or a cord used to tie the strings of a kimono)
- ta**bako** : ta**ba**ko (cigarettes/tobacco)
- **Chi**yoko : Chi**yo**ko (a girls' name)
- tsu**tsu**ji : tsu**tsuji** (azalea)
- ha**shira** : **ha**shira (pillar)
- yu**ube** : **yu**ube (last night, evening)
- o**basan** : o**ba**san (“ma’am”, an old lady) – when obasan means aunt instead, the pitch accent is the same as the standard
- **ko**umori : ko**u**mori (bat)
- sa**ku** : **sa**ku (to bloom)
- nu**ku** : **nu**ku (to omit)
- **ha**iru : ha**i**ru (to enter)
- **o**oi : o**o**i (many)

=== Changes in pronunciation ===
- za, zo → da, do; for example, zoukin (dust-cloth) → doukin
- nou → nyou; for example, kinou (yesterday) → kinyou
- rada → dara; for example, karada (body) → kadara. However, aside from karada, no other words have this widespread change in pronunciation (though some older Ōita residents may pronounce other words similarly).
- anna → agena, sonna → sogena, dounimo kounimo → dogen kogen, and other similar instances. Additionally, when speaking rapidly, anna → aina and similar changes are common.
- tsu → tu; for example tsumaran (boring) → tumaran. This mainly exists in the northern regions of Ōita, especially with people middle-aged or older.

== Characteristic vocabulary ==
This section contains some of the typical words and phrases in Ōita-ben. Words are listed according to Japanese alphabetical order with Ōita-ben on the left and standard Japanese on the right. The accented syllable is in bold.

- a**i**i/a**e**e : aoi (blue)
- a**taru** : sawaru (to touch)
- a**do** : kakato (heel [of a foot, shoe, etc.])
- **a**bo : mochi
- a**yuru** : a verb describing the action when strong winds cause fruits or berries to fall from tree branches
- ara**kii**/a**rakene**e : arappoi (rough, rude)
- a**nshi** : ano hito (that person). shi comes from the kanji 衆 meaning "people", and anshi is thought to have come from the term otokoshi (男衆; meaning "men" or sometimes "manservant").
- '**iichiko'** : ii (good). Used in northern Ōita, especially the Nakatsu area. chiko is an emphasizing suffix. The sake company Sanwa Shurui makes a barley shōchū of the same name.
- i**kazu toukyouben** : a term to make fun of someone who tries to hold informal conversations (as opposed to polite speech) in standard Japanese rather than Ōita-ben.
- i**kachii** : Used in the northern regions, its meaning is similar to the seikaku ga warui ("bad person") meaning of oroii found below. In two-person conversations it is often used to refer to the other person in a non-serious, joking manner ("Anta ikachii waa!"), but it can also be used to negatively refer to a third-person.
- is**sunzuri** : a term that refers to heavy traffic, specifically the motion of moving and then stopping, moving and then stopping.
- ic**chi**kacchi : a type of oak nut, specifically the Japanese Stone Oak, that you can eat without having to cook it to get rid of the astringent taste.
- i**do** : oshiri (buttocks). Used by women.
- i**bishi**i/i**bishigene**e : kitanai, kimochi warui (dirty, creepy)
- i**ya**ri/i**a**ri : ari (ant). A corruption of ie ari (house ant), it refers to ants that invade the house in search of food.
- u**tachii** : kitanai (dirty)
- e**erashi**i : kawaii (cute). Sometimes pronounced e**ra**shii.
- e**noha** : yamane (landlocked masu salmon, the name of a fish)
- o**i**san, o**ba**san : ojisan ("mister" or "uncle"), obasan ("ma'am" or "aunt"). An intimate term.
- o**ku**do : kamado (an iron pot or kettle)
- o**ji**i/o**de**e/o**zo**i/o**do**i : kowai (scary)
- o**ja**mi : otedama (beanbag, beanbag juggling game)
- **o**ssan : oshousan (Bhikkhu)
- o**ttoroshi**i : osoroshii (terrible)
- **o**tto**ro**shuna**kotsu**/**o**tto**ro**ssha**no**u : sugoi naa ("Amazing!" "Great!" etc. - an expression of admiration)
- o**rabu** : sakebu (to shout, to cry out)
- o**roi**i : In the northern areas and in Hita, it can mean either furui (old) or zurui (unfair). In Kitsuki and some other areas, it means seikaku ga warui ("bad personality" or a bad person).
- o**n**bo/**op**po : onbu (carrying on one's back)
- **ka**ku : motsu, katsugu (to hold or carry [something large])
- ka**tagu**ru : ninau (to carry [luggage, etc.] over the shoulder)
- ~suruka**tade** : ~shinagara (while doing~)
- ka**ta**ru : sanka suru (to participate), nakama ni hairu (to join a group)
- ka**chikowa**su : kowasu (to break) with kachi functioning as an emphasizing prefix, meaning to "break something so severely that it is in pieces".
- ka**tte** : karite (to borrow, to rent)
- ka**te**ru : sanka saseru (to let participate), nakama ni ireru (to let join a group)
- ka**ya**su : It can either mean to knock over a cup (or similar) and spill the liquid inside, or to turn something inside out.
- ka**ru**u : ninau (to carry over the shoulder). It is used by all generations and is so widespread that many people do not realize it is Ōita-ben.
- ki**chii** : kitsui (severe), hageshii (violent), karai (harsh), tsukareta (tired, worn-out), guai ga warui (in bad condition)
- kina : kiiro (yellow)
- ki**nodoki**i : An i-adjective form of the na-adjective ki no doku (pitiful). It has also been altered to mean something like Kyoushuku desu ("That's very kind of you") or katajikenai ("I'm indebted to you").
- ki**baru** : to prepare thoroughly, to persist, to put effort into
- ki**inee** : kiiroi (yellow)
- ki**bi** ga ii : ii kimi da ("it serves you right")
- **gyuu**rashi : gyougyoushii (exaggerated)
- **ku**de : a term for bruised fruit that can't be sold
- ku**biru** : musubu (to tie, to bind)
- ku**yu**ru : kuzureru (to collapse)
- ku**ri**i : kuroi (black)
- ke**shou mo shiren** : "It is not worth talking about"
- kec**charaki**i : a term used for someone you just can't help disliking. For example, Ano hito wa keccharakii -- "That person is disagreeable (and I can't help but dislike them)". Has fallen out of use.
- **ge**tten : something's nature or character has been warped
- **ko**ki : koko (here)
- ko**shiki**i/ko**shi**i : zurugashikoi (sly). Has fallen out of use.
- goto/gotsu : ~no you ni (like~). It is thought to be a change of gotoku (like, the same as, etc.).
- ko**biru**/ ko**biri** : a term for snacks consumed between doing farmwork
- ko**bu**ru : kajiru, kuitsuku (to bite at)
- **saa**ryama**na**a : sou da ne (that's right). Mostly an obsolete term.
- shi**ofuki** : aoyagi (trough shell, the name of a shellfish)
- shi**kata mo shiren** : bakarashii hodo tsumaranai (so boring it is absurd)
- shi**kabu**ru, ma**rikabu**ru : a term for when children have accidents; shikaburu is especially used for urine.
- shi**chikuji**i : shitsukoi (obstinate)
- shi**ttoi** : a material in the facing of a tatami mat
- ji**nashi** : conversation of no significance
- shi**ne**tto : a term for someone with two extremes in personality. It can mean either that they easily change between the two, or that they only show one side depending on the situation.
- sha**ashi**i : urusai (noisy), mendoukusai (something is troublesome)
- sha**ka**ki : sakaki (evergreen)
- sha**cchi**, sha**tte** : shiite (by force), muri ni (forcing oneself), waza to (on purpose), shocchuu (often, constantly)
- sho**u mo ne**e : doushiyou mo nai (it can't be helped), tsumaranai (boring)
- sho**washi**i : isogashii (busy)
- ji**ri**i : when the ground is still a little muddy after it rains
- shi**rashi**nken : isshoukenmei (with all one's effort)
- shi**nken** : hijou ni (extremely), totemo (very)
- su**kantarashi**i : an emphasis of sukan, Ōita-ben for kirai or iya (hate). It is even stronger than basaree sukan.
- su**cchan gacchan** : a term for when things are completely scattered, severely broken, or a doushiyou mo nai (it can't be helped) situation
- zu**tsune**e : sennai, doushiyou mo nai (it can't be helped)
- **zu**ru : a term for when things are progressing forward
- **su**motsukuren : kudaranai, bakabakashii (stupid). Used by many older people.
- **se**ku : isogu (to hurry), komu (to be crowded), haguru (to stray), sekitomeru (to dam up [a waterway, etc.])
- se**go**u, se**ga**u : ijimeru (to tease)
- se**seroshi**i : urusai (noisy)
- se**chi**i : setsunai, yarusenai, nasakenai (miserable), kitsui (severe), mendou da (troublesome)
- se**do** : roji (alleyway, especially a very narrow one)
- so**korason**bashi : sonzai ni (halfheartedly, carelessly)
- so**denshita** : Deriving from wairo (bribe), it is when an employee becomes very close to his employer and receives better wages and more favorable treatment than other employees.
- **ta**yuusan : a joking way to refer to someone who is good at singing or dancing
- **chaa**maa : Said without thinking by those (usually women) who are surprised, similar to aramaa.
- cha**inee** : chairoi (brown)
- chi**chimawa**su : to knock [something] again and again
- tsuba : kuchibiru (lips)
- tsu**bushi** : hiza (knee)
- tsu**bo** : a garden or open plot of land
- to**u** : to be within one's reach
- -**do**u : -tachi (pluralizing suffix)
- to**uki**bi : toumorokoshi (corn)
- to**uten** : totemo (very)
- to**gi** : yuujin (friend)
- to**ppakuro** : uso (lie), hora (boast)
- **do**be : biri (last on the list), saikai (lowest rank)
- doroyokoi : a term for when the busy farm season begins to slow down
- to**wazuben** : hitorigoto (monologue, speaking to oneself)
- na**o**su : mono wo shimau, katazukeru (to put [something] away)
- **na**shika, **na**shikae : nande da? (why?). Widely recognized throughout Ōita; there are even books and radio programs titled Yuugata nashika.
- **na**ba : kinoko (mushroom), especially relating to the thickness of shiitake mushrooms
- na**nkaka**ru : yorikakaru (to lean against). Used in regions north of Ōita City. Also used in Kagoshima and Kumamoto Prefectures, though in the latter it is pronounced nenkakaru.
- na**nkurikaya**su : an emphasized form of uragaesu (to turn inside out)
- ni**ki** : same as neki
- ne**ki** : often seen as n neki, where n is a contraction of no, meaning no atari or no kinjo (in the area/neighborhood)
- ne**jiki**ne : kimuzukashii (hard to please, moody). Can also refer to a person who is kimuzukashii.
- ha**ka**wara : hakachi (cemetery). When another word (such as shin [new] or the cemetery name, etc.) comes before it, it often corrupts to bakara.
- ba**sare**e : monosugoku (extremely), not really used apart from older people
- ha**jike**e, hajikaii : a term for when something itches or prickles
- ba**toko** : a term for the fixed fee paid to rent land such as a parking spot. Cannot be used for house or apartment rent.
- ha**wa**ku : haku (to sweep [with a broom])
- bikitan : kaeru (frog)
- fu**ke**ru : saezuru (to sing, to chirp) - as a godan verb, the negative is fukeranai (fukeran in Ōita-ben)
- **bi**ko : musume (daughter) - not limited to one's own daughter
- hi**koji**ru : hikizuru (to drag)
- hi**jii** : kitsui (severe), tsukareta (worn-out)
- hi**dari**i : onaka ga suita (hungry)
- **bit**tare : darashinai hito (slovenly person), kitanai hito (dirty person)
- hi**doru** : the action of stepping back while facing forward. It can also mean to take a position "one step back" from your superiors.
- bi**bin**ko : medaka (Japanese rice fish)
- bin**bin**ko, bi**bin**ko : kataguruma (riding piggyback)
- hi**rikabu**ru : omorashi wo suru (to urinate), especially a large amount
- bus**same**e : mendoukusai (troublesome). Used in Usa. The meaning is close to yodakii.
- ho**karu**, ho**ka**su : suteru (to throw away)
- ho**ki** : gake (cliff), or a rough spot on a path along a cliff
- ho**taru** : houtte oku (to leave alone), sono mama ni shite oku (to leave it as is), suteru (to throw away)
- **bo**ru : moreru (to leak), as in "rain leaks through the roof". Cannot be used for hanashi ga moreru (a story leaks out) or similar.
- **ho**n : totemo (very)
- **bo**n : otoko no ko (boy)
- ho**nnako**te**na**a : honto da ne (that's true)
- ma**u** : mawaru (to turn)
- ma**n** : un (luck), as in man ga ii (lucky)
- mu**gene**e : kawaisou (poor thing). Also used by the younger generation.
- me**ndoshi**i : hazukashii (embarrassing). There are also many young people who mistake it for mendoukusai (troublesome) and use it similarly.
- mo**uga** : maguwa (rake)
- mo**na**, mo**una** : totemo, sugoku (very). Used in Bungo Takada and its surroundings.
- ya**zene**e : isogashii (busy), sewashinai (restless, in a hurry)
- ya**zen no hana ni** : totan ni (just as)
- **yu**nbe, **yo**nbe : yuube (evening)
- yo**ko**u : kyuukei suru (to take a rest). A linguistic corruption of ikou (to rest).
- yo**daki**i : used similarly to mendou (trouble) or tsukareta (tired). Comes from the Heian term yodakeshi. It is widely used within Ōita and is also used in Miyazaki.
- **wa**yaku : itazura (prank)
- **wa**kudo : kaeru (frog)
- **wa**re : Exercise caution when using this term, because depending on the region it can mean either omaesan (my dear) or, within the center regions of Ōita, kisama (a rude "you"). Only used by men.
