= Narada dialect =

Dialect of Japanese spoken in Hayakawa, Yamanshi Prefecture

- 奈良田方言
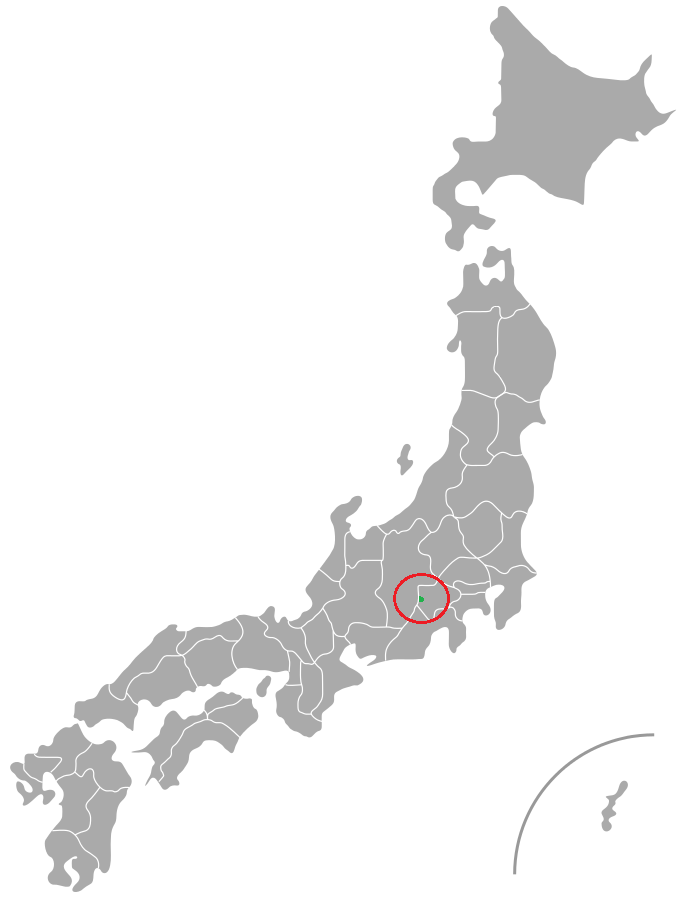
- Approximate Narada dialect area.
- Native to: Japan
- Region: Narada, Hayakawa, Yamanashi
- Language family: Japonic: Japanese; Eastern Japanese; Tōkai-Tōsan; Narada dialect

Language codes
- ISO 639-3: –

The Narada dialect (奈良田方言, Narada hōgen) is an extinct dialect of Japanese that was spoken in the village of Narada in Yamanashi Prefecture, in central Japan. It was a language island, possessing many unique traits.

== Classification ==
The Narada dialect was a Tokai-Tosan dialect, a group of dialects still spoken in central Japan. It formed its own branch within this, separate from the major subgroupings.

== History ==
Narada was exceptionally isolated from ancient times; until the Meiji era the nearest settlement was over 2 hours away on foot. Villagers married exclusively amongst themselves, and interactions with outsiders were rare. This environment fostered the persistence of older linguistic traits whilst also spurring the development of locally unique features. After World War II, various prefectural assemblies sought to have academic research conducted into the Narada dialect, with the resultant studies generating nationwide attention. Despite this, development of the nearby town of Hayakawa for electricity generation purposes, in addition to other factors, led to substantial changes in the lives of the residents. A following increase in emigration and the continued ageing of its population meant that by the 1970s, young speakers had all but vanished, placing the dialect at risk of extinction. In 1998, all speakers were aged 40 or over, and by 2020 the dialect had fallen out of everyday use. Despite its sharp decline, a recent study found that the pitch accent and grammar of the Japanese spoken by current residents is heavily influenced by the former dialect.

== Grammar ==
In the formerly long-secluded Narada, archaic grammar has been well preserved, with multiple unique traits.

=== Auxiliary verbs ===
- Nu (ぬ) and noo (のー) are used as negative auxiliary verbs. For example: kakanai (書かない don't write) = kakanoo (かかのー). No is thought to originate from -nafu (-なふ) in Central Old Japanese, and is also found in another language island, the Ikawa dialect.
- Too (とー) is used for the past tense of a verb. It is also used in other parts of Yamanashi Prefecture. For example: nonda (飲んだ drank) = nondoo (のんどー).
- Usage of ra (ら) and zura (ずら) for conjecture and zaa (ざー) and zu (ず) for volition and persuasion is shared with the Koshu dialect.

=== Particles ===
- Sa (さ) is used as an equivalent to the directional particles ni (に) and he (へ) in standard Japanese.
- Totte (とって) is used as an equivalent to the adversative conjunction keredo (けれど but, although).
- De (で) is used as a cause/reason-expressing conjunction, whilst node (ので because, so) and kara (から same as node) are rarely used.
