= Hida dialect =

Japanese dialect of Gifu

- Native to: Japan
- Region: northern Gifu
- Language family: Japonic: Japanese; Eastern Japanese; Tōkai–Tōsan; Gifu–Aichi; Hida dialect

Language codes
- ISO 639-3: –
- Glottolog: hida1245

The Hida dialect (飛騨弁, Hida-ben) is a Japanese dialect spoken in the Hida region of Gifu Prefecture, Japan. Along with the Mino dialect in the south, it is one of the two main dialects of Gifu Prefecture.

The phrase「楽しんでください」(Literally "Please have fun") is more commonly「楽しみない」(which would be interpreted as "Not having excitement" in Standard Japanese) in Hida-ben.

== Sources ==
- "Dr. Yamamoto's Web Site for Hida Dialect". Archived from the original on 2006-06-02.

== See also ==
- Japanese dialects
- Your Name
