= Tōkai–Tōsan dialects =

Group of Japanese dialects spoken in Chūbu, Japan

Tōkai–Tōsan Japanese
- Chūbu dialect
- Native to: Japan
- Region: Chūbu
- Language family: Japonic: Japanese; Eastern Japanese; Tōkai–Tōsan Japanese

Language codes
- ISO 639-3: –
- Glottolog: toka1245
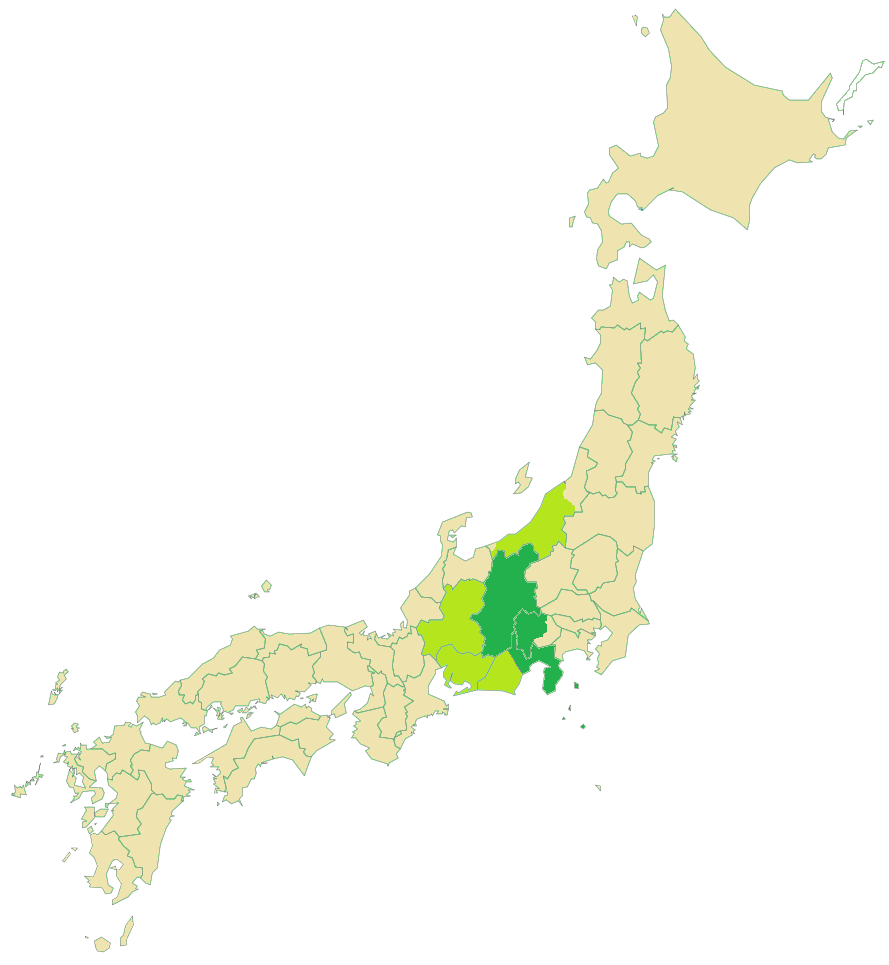
- Chartreuse: the transitional Tōkai–Tōsan dialects (Gifu–Aichi and Echigo), with both Eastern and Western features. Green: prototypical Eastern Japanese dialects (Yamanashi, Nagano, Eastern Shizuoka).

The Tōkai–Tōsan dialect (東海東山方言 Tōkai–Tōsan hōgen) is a group of the transitional Japanese dialects spoken in the southern and eastern Chūbu region. The dialects spoken in the northwest Chubu region are classified as the Hokuriku dialect of Western Japanese. The Tokai–Tosan dialect has three sub-groups: Gifu–Aichi, Echigo, and Nagano–Yamanashi–Shizuoka. These are transitional between Western and Eastern Japanese; which branch of the family they fall in depends on which isoglosses are taken as definitive. (See Eastern and Western Japanese for details.)

== Nagano–Yamanashi–Shizuoka ==
The Nagano–Yamanashi–Shizuoka a.k.a. Na-Ya-Shi dialects are spoken in Nagano Prefecture, Yamanashi Prefecture and Shizuoka Prefecture. It is characterized by a presumptive suffix -zura or -ra.

- Nagano a.k.a. Shinshū dialect (Nagano Prefecture)
  - Okushinano dialect (Sakae, the northernmost village)
  - Hokushin dialect (northern area)
  - Tōshin dialect (eastern area)
  - Chūshin dialect (central area)
  - Nanshin dialect (southern area)
- Shizuoka dialect (Shizuoka Prefecture especially central area)
  - Izu dialect (eastern Shizuoka Prefecture, formerly known as Izu Province)
  - Enshū dialect (western Shizuoka Prefecture, formerly known as Tōtōmi Province)
- Kōshū a.k.a. Yamanashi dialect (Yamanashi Prefecture, especially western area)

== Echigo ==
The Echigo dialect is spoken in mainly Niigata Prefecture, formerly known as Echigo Province except north of the Agano River.

- Niigata dialect (city of Niigata)
- Nagaoka dialect (central Niigata Prefecture, centered Nagaoka)
- Jōetsu dialect (western Niigata Prefecture, centered Jōetsu)
- Uonuma dialect (southern Niigata Prefecture)

== Gifu–Aichi ==
The Gifu–Aichi a.k.a. Gi–A dialects are spoken in Gifu Prefecture and Aichi Prefecture. They share many grammar features with Western Japanese.

- Mino dialect (southern Gifu Prefecture, formerly known as Mino Province)
- Hida dialect (northern Gifu Prefecture, formerly known as Hida Province)
- Owari dialect (western Aichi Prefecture, formerly known as Owari Province)
  - Chita dialect (along the Chita Peninsula)
  - Nagoya dialect (Nagoya)
- Mikawa dialect (eastern Aichi Prefecture, formerly known as Mikawa Province)
  - West Mikawa (centered Okazaki)
  - East Mikawa (centered Toyohashi)

== Language islands ==
Mountain village dialects that retain fragments of Eastern Old Japanese.

- Akiyamago dialect (Akiyamago area straddling Sakae, Nagano and Tsunan, Niigata)
- Narada dialect (Narada village in Hayakawa, Yamanashi)
- Ikawa dialect (the upper reaches of the Ōi River in Shizuoka)

== In popular culture ==
- At the beginning of the movie Your Name the teacher teaches students differences between the standard Japanese language and the Tōkai-Tōsan dialect.
