= Nagoya dialect =

Japanese dialect spoken in Nagoya, Aichi Prefecture

- Owari dialect
- Native to: Japan
- Region: Nagoya, Aichi
- Language family: Japonic: Japanese; Eastern Japanese; Tōkai–Tōsan; Gifu–Aichi; Owari; Nagoya dialect

Language codes
- ISO 639-3: –
- Glottolog: owar1237 Owari nago1242 Nagoya

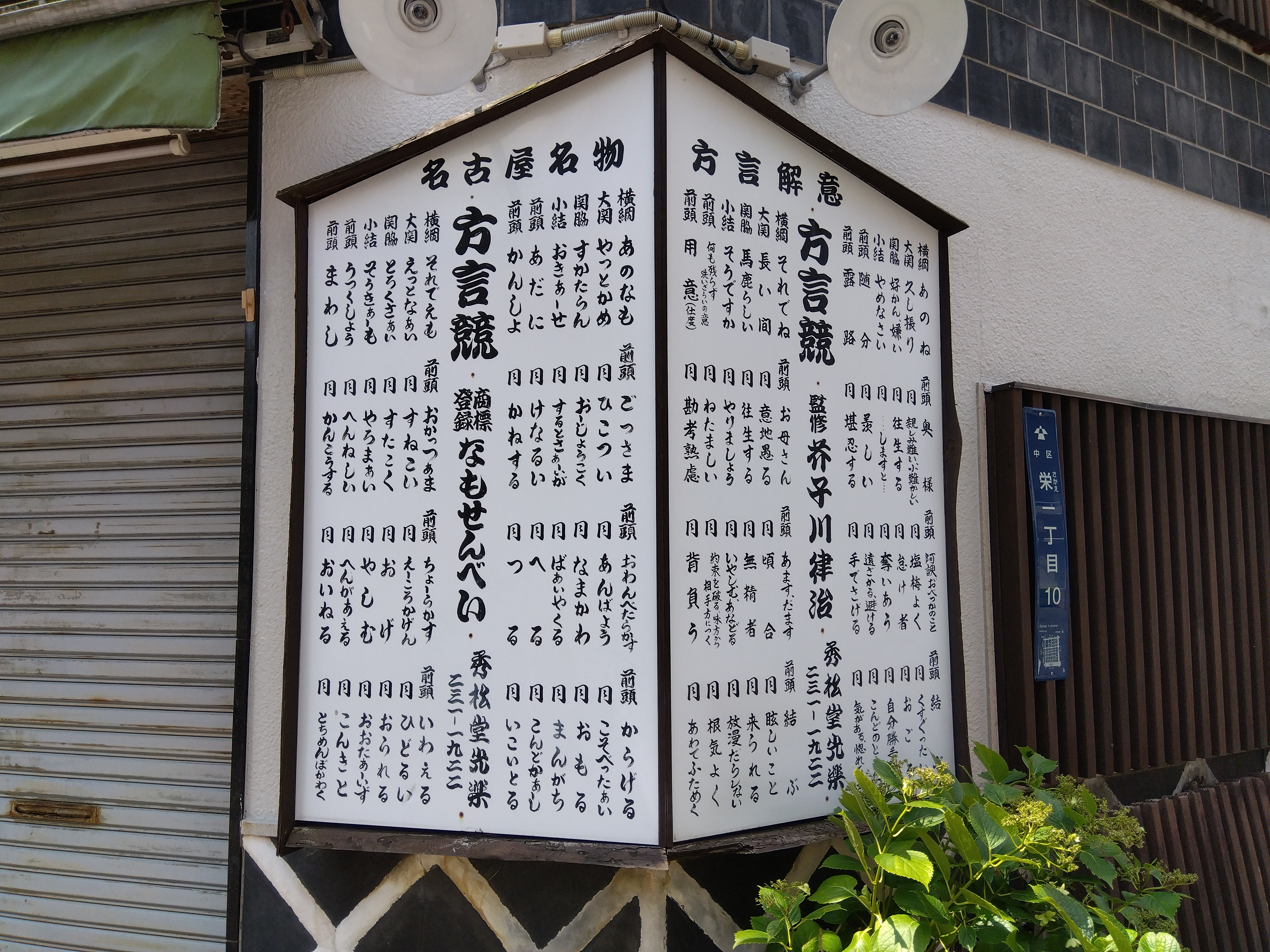
Nagoya dialect number table of Shushodo Koura, a Japanese confectionery shop in Sakae, Naka-ku, Nagoya

The Nagoya dialect (名古屋弁, Nagoya-ben) is a Japanese dialect spoken in Nagoya, Aichi Prefecture. In a wide sense, Nagoya dialect means the dialect in the western half of the prefecture (formerly part of Owari Province), and in that case, it is also called Owari dialect (尾張弁 Owari-ben). The dialect spoken in the eastern half of the prefecture (formerly part of Mikawa Province) is different from Nagoya dialect and called Mikawa dialect (三河弁 Mikawa-ben).

== Phonology ==
Nagoya dialect is well known for possessing monophthongs where vowel sequences are found in Standard: [ai] and [ae] become [æː] ([eː] or [aː] in some areas), [oi] becomes [øː] or [öː], and [ui] becomes [yː] or [üː]; in recent years, their use has significantly declined among young people. [æː] is very famous as a characteristic of the Nagoya dialect; it is widely imitated as a stereotype of Nagoya speakers and often becomes a target of jokes such as "Nagoya people speak like a cat" (a play on words with [mæː] or [næː] and "meow"). Japanese comedian Tamori once joked about Nagoya dialect such as ebifuryaa (incorrect Nagoya form of ebifurai or "fried prawn") and made Nagoya people angry, but restaurateurs in Nagoya took advantage of the joke and ebifurai became one of Nagoya's specialty foods.

ex. do-erai umai ("very yummy") > [døːræː umæː] > [deːræː umæː]; ja nai ka? ("isn't it?") > [ʥa næː ka]; omae ("you") > [omæː]

The Pitch accent of Nagoya dialect is almost the same system as the Tokyo accent, but tends to shift the start of high pitch. For example, Nagoya-ben is pronounced as Low-High-High-High-High in Tokyo, and Low-Low-High-High-High in Nagoya. Some words have different downsteps between Nagoya and Tokyo. For example, Nagoya is pronounced as High-Low-Low in Tokyo, and Low-Low-High in Nagoya; arigato ("thanks") is pronounced as Low-High-Low-Low in Tokyo, and Low-Low-High-Low in Nagoya; itsumo ("always") is pronounced as High-Low-Low in Tokyo, and Low-High-Low in Nagoya. Interrogative words such as nani ("what") and dore ("which") have an accent on first mora in Tokyo, and accentless in Nagoya. Demonstratives (except do-) such as kore ("this") and sore ("it") are accentless in Tokyo, and have an accent on last mora in Nagoya.

== Grammar ==
The grammar of the Nagoya dialect shows intermediate characteristics between eastern Japanese (including standard Tokyo dialect) and western Japanese (including Kansai dialect). For example, Nagoya dialect uses eastern copula da instead of western ya (to be precise, [dæː] in traditional Nagoya dialect); western negative verb ending -n and -sen instead of eastern -nai; western verb oru (to exist [humans/animals]) instead of eastern iru. Onbin of verbs is same as eastern, but one of adjectives is same as western; for example, "eat quickly" becomes hayoo kutte in Nagoya dialect instead of eastern hayaku kutte and western hayoo kuute.

=== Particles ===
Tokyoites frequently use sa and ne, and Osakans frequently use naa. In contrast, Nagoya speakers frequently put yoo between phrases. De is another characteristic particle of Nagoya dialect. In the Nagoya dialect, the no in no de "because" is optional. Monde is also used as well as de in Nagoya dialect.

==== Sentence final particles ====
Nagoya dialect has a wider range of sentence-final particles than is used in standard Japanese.

gaya
(1) Used when the speaker is surprised. (1a) When surprised about the current situation. Ex. Yuki ga futtoru gaya. (It is snowing!) (1b) When an idea flashed through the speaker's mind, or when the speaker remembers something suddenly. ex. Ikan ikan, wasuretotta gaya. (Oh no, I forgot it.)
(2) To let the listener know the speaker is surprised of what the listener did. (2a) When surprised for the listener's ability, richness or something good. Ex. Sugoi gaya. (You are great.) (2b) When surprised for the listener's incompetence or something not good, ordering the listener to do better. Ex. Ikan gaya. (Literally "It's prohibited". The speaker is surprised that the listener does not know it and is ordering them to remember it is prohibited.)
(3) {misuse} sometimes used to mimic Nagoya-ben. Also gyaa.
gane
Almost the same as gaya but is somewhat soft.
ga, gaa, ge, gee, gan
These are contractions of gaya or gane and are relatively new words.
te, tee
To emphasize the statement.
to
"I heard" or "They say". Used when the speaker is in direct to the source. Ex. Sore wa chigau to. (They say it is not so.)
gena
Also "I heard" or "They say". Less confident than to.
ni
Used when the speaker thinks that the listener does not know what the speaker is saying, equivalent to Standard yo. Ex. Wikipedia wa furii nanda ni. (Wikipedia is free. (I bet you don't know it.))
mai, maika
Used after the volitional form of verbs to make it clear that the speaker is inviting. The "shiyou" form once had meaning of "maybe" though this usage is archaic both in Nagoya-ben and the Standard Japanese today. Ex. Nagoya-ben shaberomai. (Let's speak Nagoya dialect.)
shan, kashan, kashiran, shiran.
(1)"I wonder". Same as kashira in Standard Japanese though "kashira" is used only by women while these are used both by men and women. Ex. Kore de ii kashan. (I wonder if it is OK.)
(2)"I am not sure". Ex. Nan da shan ittotta. (He said something though I am not sure what he said.)
Whether there is "ka" or not is due to the speaker.
de kan
(1)Expresses that the speaker is not satisfied. Ex. Kaze hiite matta de kan.(I have caught a cold. (I hate it).)
(2)Expresses that the speaker is pleased. Same as some Americans say "bad" to mean "good".
wa
Used only by women in Standard Japanese, but also used by men in Nagoya dialect.
miyo
Formed from the command form of the verb "miru"(to see). Attached to attract the listener's attention mostly in order to scold them. Ex. Kowaketematta miyo. (Look what you've done. It's broken.)
miyaa, mii
Formed from the soft command form of the verb "miru"(to see). Attached to attract the listener's attention. But the usage is not restricted to scolding.
namo
Polite particle mainly used by upper-class people, though is obsolete and the Standard Japanese auxiliary verb "-masu" is used instead today. Also emo.

=== Auxiliary verbs ===
Nagoya-ben has some auxiliary verbs which are not used in the standard language. Some standard helping verbs are contracted in Nagoya dialect.

yaa, yaase
Forms a soft order. Ex. Yookee tabeyaa. (Eat a lot.)
sseru, yasseru, yaasu
Forms an expression in respectful language.
In some sub-dialects of Nagoya-ben, yaasu is used for the second person and sseru/yasseru for the third.
choosu
Respectful form of the helping verb kureru. Kudasaru in Standard Japanese.
mau^{1}
contraction of helping verb shimau.
mau^{2}
contraction of helping verb morau. Differs from mau^{1} in accent.
...tekan
contraction of -te wa ikan, Standard Japanese -te wa ikenai
...toru
contraction of -te oru, Standard Japanese -te iru.
...taru^{1}
contraction of -te aru.
...taru^{2}
contraction of -te yaru. Differs from taru^{1} in accent.
imperfective form (mizenkei) + suka
strong negative. Ex. Ikasuka (I will never go.)
continuative form (ren'yōkei) + yotta
Used to talk about old days.
imperfective form (mizenkei) + na kan
contraction of -neba ikan, Standard Japanese -nakereba ikenai.
imperfective form (mizenkei) + na^{1}
Negative conditional form.
imperfective form (mizenkei) + na^{2}
Contraction of -nakan, Standard Japanese -nakereba ikenai. Used mainly to command.
imperfective form (mizenkei) + n naran
Contraction of -neba naran, Standard Japanese -nakereba naranai.

== Vocabulary ==
- Some words which are obsolete in Standard Japanese are still used.
- The number after an entry is the syllable accented. 0 means that the word is accentless.
- It does not reflect the transformations of diphthongs.

afurakasu 4 溢らかす
5v. to overflow, spill.
ayasui 3 あやすい
i-adj. easy to do.
arakenai 4 荒気ない
i-adj. violent, rough.
anbayoo 4 塩梅良う
adv. well; cleverly; skillfully. Note that the pronunciation is not *anbaiyoo.
igoku 2
v. to move. Standard Japanese "ugoku".
izarakasu 4 居去らかす
5v. (1) to drag. (2) to make something move.
izaru 0 居去る
5v. (1) to crawl (man moves not standing up) (2) to move in short distance.
ikka 1 幾日
n. (1)(obsolete) what day. (2)the day which is not definite now.
uderu 2 うでる
1v. to boil. Standard Japanese "yuderu".
ushinaeru 0 失える
1v to lose. Standard Japanese "ushinau" or "nakusu".
erai 2 えらい
i-adj. sick. painful. The word means "great" in the Standard Japanese.
oojookoku 5 往生こく
5v. To suffer hardship.
oochaku 0 横着
na-adj. idle.
okureru 3 御呉れる
1v. the respectful form of the verb "kureru"(give). Less polite than "Kudasaru".
osogai 3 おそがい
i-adj. scary.
ossan 1 おっさん
n. a Buddhism priest. Contraction of "oshoo-san". Note that the homonym "ossan" meaning "uncle" or "old man" differs in accent.
obowaru 3 覚わる
5v. to learn.
kaimon 3 支い物
n. (1) chips for kau. (2) curing compounds for kau.
kau 1 支う
5v. (1) to put something (props, sprags, chips of wood, etc.) in the opening to fix. (2) to lock the door. (3) to put curing compounds between jack and structure.
kazusuru 1 数する
suru-v. to count. Standard Japanese kazoeru.
kawasu 2
5v. emphasis form of kau. to put tightly.
kan 0 かん
Contraction of "ikan" (no good). "ikenai" in standard Japanese.
kankō 0 勘考
suru-v. To scheme, plot, devise, etc.
kisaru 0 着さる
5v. to fit. "awaseru" in the Standard Japanese.
kiseru 0 着せる
1v. Other than Standard Japanese "put on clothes," can also mean to fasten a lid or put on a cap.
kiinai, kinai 3, 2 黄ない
i-adj. yellow. "kiiroi" in the Standard Japanese.
kusugaru 0
5v. To be stuck. Standard Japanese "sasaru".
kusugeru 0
1v. To stick. Standard Japanese "sasu".
ketta 0 ケッタ
n. bicycle.
kettamashiin 5 ケッタマシーン
(← ketta + eng. machine) n. (1) ketta. (2)bicycle with transmission. (3)motorcycle.
goburei 2 御無礼
suru-v. Often used for greeting idiom when you leave, decline, apologize with -masu form. "shitsurei" in Standard Japanese.
tawake/taake 0 戯け
n. fool. "baka" in Standard Japanese, "aho" in Kansai dialect.
chatto 1 or 0 ちゃっと
adv. quickly. immediately. "sassato" in Standard Japanese.
tsuru 0 吊る
5v. to carry a desk. "tsuru" means "to hang" in Standard Japanese.
doerai 3 どえらい
adv. very. extremely. Also deerai 3 and dera 0.
dobe 1 どべ
n. the lowest rank. last place in the ranking. "biri" in Standard Japanese.
torokusai 2 とろ臭い
i-adj. (1) inept. (2) absurd. "noroi" and "bakabakashii" in Standard Japanese.
hooka 0 放課
n. break time between school lessons. Do not confuse with "hookago" ("after school") in Standard Japanese.
maa 0 まあ
adv. already. "moo" in Standard Japanese. Ex. Maa, kan. (I can't stand it anymore.)
mieru 2 みえる
1v. Respectful form of the verb kuru ("come") in Standard Japanese, but respectful form of the verb iru ("exist") in Nagoya dialect. Ex. Tanaka-san, miemasu? (Is Mr. Tanaka there? (honorific speech))
yattokame 0 八十日目
na-adj. after a long time. "hisashiburi" in Standard Japanese. Yattokame da namo ("Long time no see") is a famous phrase of Nagoya dialect.
yookee 3 ようけい
adv. many. "takusan" in Standard Japanese. Also yooke 0, which is also used in Kansai dialect.
waya 1 わや
na-adj. spoiled. ruined. "mechakucha" and "dame" in Standard Japanese. Also used in Kansai dialect and so on.

== See also ==
- Mino dialect
- Takashi Kawamura - The mayor of Nagoya. He speaks with strong Nagoya dialect and appeals to protect Nagoya dialect.
- Yoshinori Shimizu - A novelist from Nagoya. He often incorporates his native dialect in his works.
- Hitoshi Ueki - An actor from Nagoya. He performed with Nagoya dialect in some dramas.
- Kinsan Ginsan, Keiko Takeshita, Masa Yamada, Haruhiko Kato - Other famous people who are native Nagoya dialect speakers.
- King Nikochan
- Yatogame-chan Kansatsu Nikki - A manga introducing the unique culture and customs of Nagoya. The heroine, who speaks in a thick Nagoya dialect, has hair designed to resemble cat ears.
