= Hokkaido dialects =

Japanese dialects spoken in Hokkaido

Hokkaido dialect
- Native to: Japan
- Region: Hokkaido
- Language family: Japonic: Japanese; Eastern Japanese; (unclear); Hokkaido dialect

Language codes
- ISO 639-3: –
- Glottolog: hokk1249
- IETF: ja-u-sd-jp01

The dialect or dialects of Hokkaido (北海道方言, Hokkaidō-hōgen), commonly called Hokkaidō-ben (北海道弁), originated in the area where people from all over Japan gathered and settled.

Since the Meiji period, immigrants have flowed into the inland areas of Hokkaido, especially from the mixed areas of the Tohoku and Hokuriku regions, resulting in a mixture of various Japanese dialects in Hokkaido.

The relationship of Hokkaidō dialect to the rest of Japanese—and whether there even is a coherent Hokkaidō dialect—are the subject of debate. Shibata (2003) mentions three theories:

1. Inland varieties are part of the Kantō dialect, while coastal varieties are part of the Tōhoku dialect
2. There is a single Hokkaidō dialect, which is a distinct branch of Eastern Japanese
3. There is a Hokkaidō dialect, but it descends from Niigata dialect (one of the Tōkai–Tōsan dialects), a transitional form with Western Japanese features.

Tōhoku influence is strongest in coastal areas, especially on the Oshima Peninsula in the south, where the local variety is commonly called Hama-kotoba (浜言葉; seashore speech). The urban dialect of Sapporo is quite close to Standard Japanese. Western features may have been brought by merchants from Kansai and Hokuriku following the Kitamaebune ("northern-bound ships") trading route.

An Ainu language substrate exists due to interaction between the Japanese who settled there in the Meiji period and indigenous Ainu.

== Expressions ==
- The -re imperative form for ichidan verbs and s-irregular verb instead of Standard form -ro
- The volitional and presumptive suffix -be; from Tohoku dialect
- The presumptive suffix -sho or -ssho; contraction of Standard polite presumptive form deshō
- tōkibi for "corn" instead of Standard tōmorokoshi; also used in many Japanese dialects
- shibareru for "to freeze, freezing cold" instead of Standard kogoeru; from Tohoku dialect
- nageru for "to throw away" instead of Standard suteru; from Tohoku dialect; nageru means "to throw" in Standard
- waya for "fruitless, no good" instead of Standard dame; from Western Japanese
- shitakke for casual "good-bye" or "then" instead of Standard (sore) ja
- namara for "very" instead of Standard totemo; since the 1970s from Niigata dialect
