= Nagaoka dialect =

Japanese dialect of Nagaoka

- Native to: Japan
- Region: Nagaoka, Niigata
- Language family: Japonic: Japanese; Eastern Japanese; Tōkai–Tōsan; Echigo; Nagaoka dialect

Language codes
- ISO 639-3: –
- Glottolog: naga1406

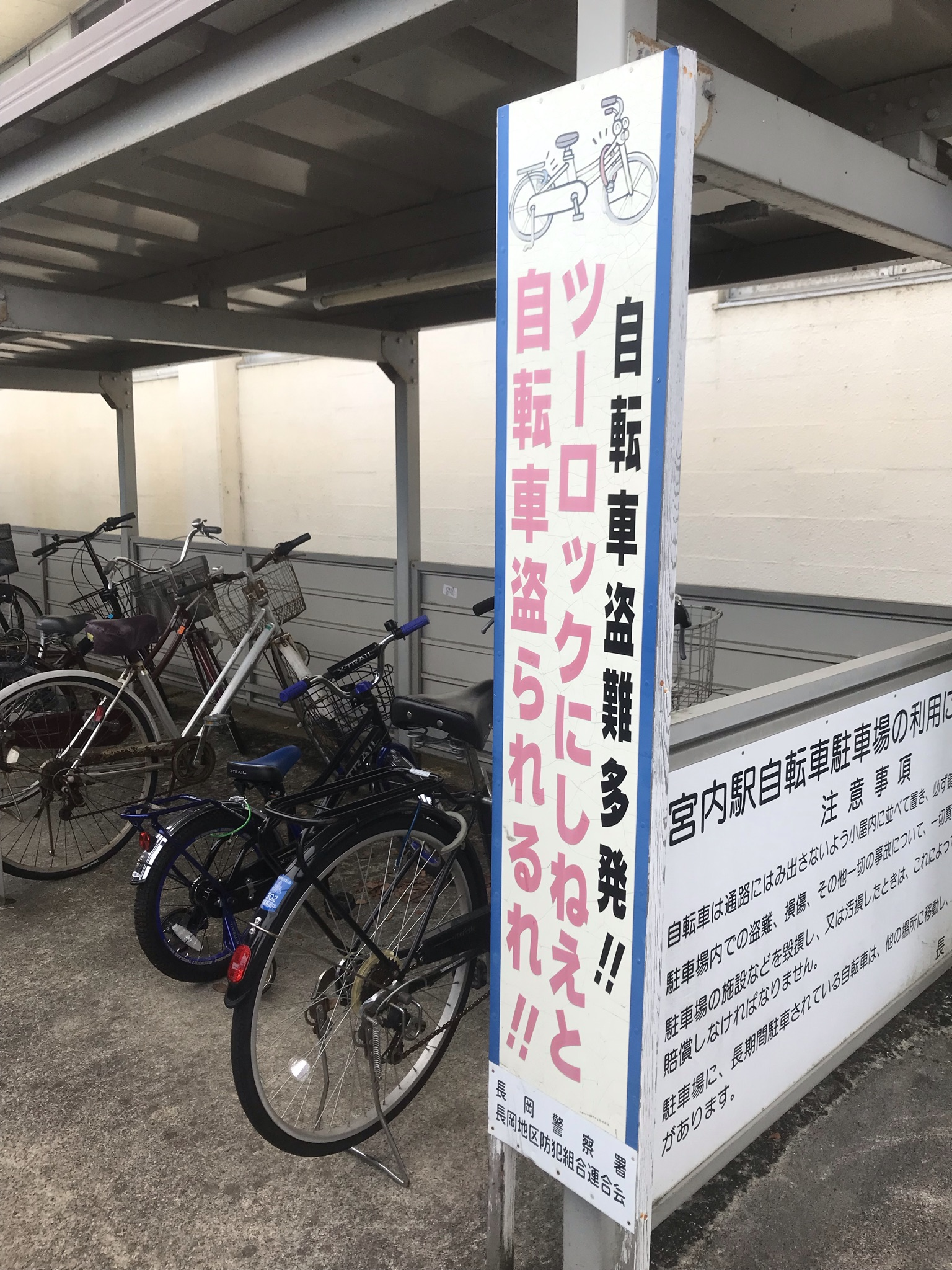
A warning sign written in Nagaoka dialect. Photographed in front of Miyauchi Station.

Nagaoka dialect is a dialect of the Japanese language spoken in Chūetsu region centered Nagaoka city in Niigata prefecture of Japan. Nagaoka dialect is similar to Niigata dialect spoken in the Shin'etsu region. It differs somewhat from town to town.

== Accent ==
The accent of the Nagaoka dialect is classified as being among the outer range of the Tokyo accent group. With the development of modern media and transportation in recent years, there has been a trend, mostly among younger people, to use the middle range of the Tokyo accent group, which was originally used only in Itoigawa. For example, two-syllable words originally having a heiban accent, meaning a word ending with a high pitch that carries over to the following particle, have changed to an odaka accent, meaning the high pitch no longer carries over to the particle.

Some additional difference from the standard Tokyo dialect:

Japanese word	Tokyo accent	Nagaoka accent	English translation
ネズミ	nezumi	neꜜzumi	rat
卵	tamaꜜgo	taꜜmago	egg
服	fuku	fuꜜku	clothes
靴	kutsu	kuꜜtsu	shoe(s)

== Grammar ==
=== ga ===
The postposition ga is probably the best known element of the Nagaoka dialect. It is typically placed at the end of sentences to alter the speaker's tone. It is basically equivalent to (no da) yo or no in standard Japanese. It is often pronounced with a lengthened vowel sound, i.e. gā, written in Japanese as がー or がぁ. Features of ga:

- When spoken with rising intonation it can often indicate a question, while falling intonation often shows the speaker's understanding or concent.
- Unlike regular postpositions, additional postpositions can be added after ga, such as ka, ya and te.
- The copula da/desu and the polite form -masu can be abbreviated when ga is added, e.g. "This is Nagaoka." which would be rendered in standard Japanese as Koko wa Nagaoka na n da (ここは長岡なんだ) would be Koko wa Nagaoka n ga (ここは長岡んが) (Note that na has also been lost). Other auxiliary verbs are not removed.

=== te ===
Like ga, te is generally attached to the end of a sentence, and carries a meaning similar to (da) yo in standard Japanese. Unlike ga, however, da, desu and -masu are not removed when te is added, e.g. "This is Nagaoka", rendered in standard Japanese as Koko wa Nagaoka da yo (ここは長岡だよ) would be Koko wa Nagaoka da te (ここは長岡だて) in Nagaoka dialect.

=== ra ===
The copula da and its derivative darō are replaced with ra and raro, e.g. standard Japanese Sō darō? (そうだろう？) becomes Sō raro? (そうらろ？) in Nagaoka dialect.

== Vocabulary ==
Below is a list of example words from the Nagaoka dialect:

Nagaoka dialect	Standard Japanese	English	Lexical category
atchē (あっちぇ)	atsui (熱い、暑い)	hot	adjective
ga (が)	(da) yo ((だ)よ)	see above	particle
ga, nga, gan (が、んが、がん)	to iu mono, na mono (というもの、なもの)	that, thing	particle
-gakeba (～がけば)	-nara (～なら)	if	verb ending
na, nā (な、な～、なぁ～)	anata (あなた)	you	pronoun
shagu, shagitsukeru (しゃぐ/しゃぎつける)	naguru, tataku (殴る、叩く)	to hit, to strike (rarely conjugated)	verb
shakkoi (しゃっこい)	tsumetai (冷たい)	cold	adjective
soiga, sōiga (そ(ー)いが)	sō na no da (そうなのだ)	oh really, is that so	phrase
sorotto (そろっと)	sorosoro (そろそろ)	soon, steadily, gradually	adverb
(dā)suke, rasuke ((だ～)すけ、らすけ)	da kara, na no de (だから、なので)	because	conjunction
te (て)	(da) yo ((だ)よ)	see above	particle
najira (なじら)	...wa dō desu ka? (～はどうですか？)	asking someone's opinion of something	phrase
butcharu (ぶっちゃる)	suteru (捨てる)	throw out, throw away	verb
mo(n)jakuru (もんじゃくる)	kushakusha ni marumeru (くしゃくしゃに丸める)	to crumple up into a ball	phrase
yakkoi (やっこい)	yawarakai (柔らかい、軟らかい)	soft	adjective
nomeshikoki (のめしこき)	mendōkusagari, namakemono (面倒臭がり、なまけもの)	lazy person	noun
shōshii (しょーしい)	hazukashii (恥ずかしい)	shy, embarrassed	adjective
