= Mikawa dialect =

Japanese dialect

- Native to: Japan
- Region: Mikawa, Aichi
- Language family: Japonic: Japanese; Eastern Japanese; Tōkai–Tōsan; Gifu–Aichi; Mikawa dialect

Language codes
- ISO 639-3: –
- Glottolog: mika1255 Mikawa east2528 Eastern Mikawa west2609 Western Mikawa
- IETF: ja-u-sd-jp23

The Mikawa dialect (三河弁, Mikawa-ben) is a Japanese dialect spoken in eastern half of Aichi Prefecture, former Mikawa Province. It is subdivided into western variety centered Okazaki and eastern variety centered Toyohashi. The Mikawa dialect is classified into the Gifu-Aichi group of the Tokai-Tosan dialect with the Nagoya dialect spoken in western half of Aichi Prefecture, however the Mikawa dialect also closes to dialects spoken in western Shizuoka Prefecture and southern Nagano Prefecture.

== Phonology ==
The Nagoya dialect is notable for peculiar monophthongs such as [omæː] (standard form omae "you"), but the Mikawa dialect is not. Pitch accent of the Mikawa dialect, especially western Mikawa, is almost same to standard Tokyo accent.

== Grammar ==
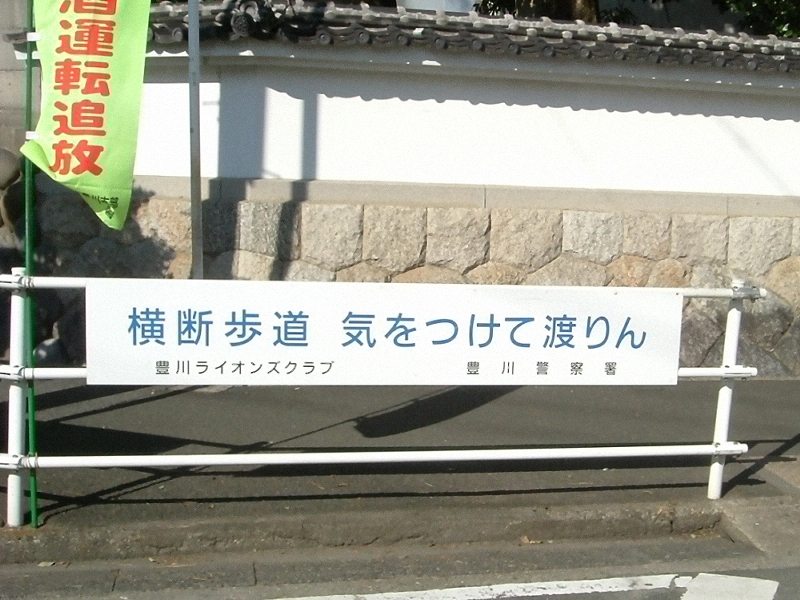
a traffic safety motto in Toyokawa. Ōdan-hodō, Ki o tsukete watarin "cross a crosswalk carefully"

The grammar of Mikawa dialect shows transitional features between Eastern and Western Japanese as well as the Nagoya dialect; use eastern copula da, western negative verb ending -n and western verb oru. Onbin of adjectives of the western Mikawa dialect is western form hayō "quickly", but one of the eastern Mikawa dialect is eastern form hayaku. Use of particles de and monde instead of standard node "because" is common to the Nagoya dialect. The Mikawa dialect is notable for its three sentence endings: jan, dara and -rin.

- jan, transformation of janai "isn't it?", is used as a slang particle since 1960s in Tokyo, but it is used by all ages in Mikawa since the early Shōwa period. Mikawa is said to one of the birthplaces of jan.
- dara or daraa, also simply raa especially in eastern Mikawa, is used to ask someone's approval or boast to someone and equivalent to standard desho and dayone. It is common to dialects spoken in Shizuoka and Chita Peninsula, but never used in Nagoya city.
- -rin or -n is a soft order form and compared to Nagoya style -yaa. -rin is connected to -masu form of ichidan verbs such as yoke taberin "eat a lot" and are mirin "look that"; -n is connected to -masu form of godan verbs such as hayaku ikin "go quickly". Soft order forms of suru "do" and kuru "come" irregular verbs are differ from person to person; shirin, serin, sen or shin for suru and korin, kirin or kin for kuru. Oiden, standard form oide and meaning "welcome", is a typical phrase of the Mikawa dialect.
- non and hoi are typical particles in the eastern Mikawa dialect. non is used as a sentence-final particle and a word used to attract another's attention just like standard ne. hoi is used as an interjection word equivalent to "hi" and it can combine with non into nonhoi; Nonhoi park, the nickname of Toyohashi Zoo & Botanical Park, was named after it.

== See also ==
- All Esper Dayo! - live action television drama and film released in 2015. It used Mikawa region as a location.

== Vocabulary ==
- age/あげ: abura-age
- asubu/あすぶ: to play
- akkaa/あっかあ: baby
- attsui/あっつい: hot
- ikeru/いける (埋ける): to bury
- ishina/いしな (石な): stone/rock
- igoku/inoku/いごく/いのく: to move
- umusu/うむす: to steam
- ebaru/えばる: to be arrogant
- okoreru/おこれる: to get angry
- osogai/おそがい: dreadful
- otsuke/おつけ: miso soup
- ottosan/ottoo/おっとさん/おっとー: dad
- odokeru/おどける: to be startled
- kekkou/けっこう (結構): in the end
- kenarui/けなるい: envious
- keyasu/けやす (消やす): to erase
- kosui/こすい (狡い): stingy
- sabui/さぶい: cold
- shonnai/しょんない: cannot be helped
- suushii/すーしい: cool
- sukenai/すけない: few
- sukeru/すける: to help, to save
- sugoi/すごい: lewd (baby talk)
- sebai/せばい: narrow
- tanto/たんと: a lot
- chissai/ちっさい: small
- chookeru/ochokeru/ちょーける/おちょける: to make fun of
- chokotto/chobitto/chokkoshi/ちょこっと/ちょびっと/ちょっこし: just a little
- chogomu/ちょごむ: to crouch
- chinjū/ちんじゅう: (naturally) curly hair
- chinbii/ちんびい: little kid
- dosamaku/どさまく: a lot
- tomo/とも (田面): (rice) field
- denshinbou/でんしんぼう: telephone pole
- nechi/ねち (根地): gum(s)
- haibo/はいぼ: ash
- houchon/ほうちょん (包丁): kitchen knife
- momota/ももた: thigh
