= Amami Japanese =

Dialect of Japanese

- トン普通語
- Native to: Japan
- Region: Kagoshima Prefecture (Amami Ōshima)
- Ethnicity: Ryukyuan
- Language family: Japonic: Japanese; Amami Japanese

Language codes
- ISO 639-3: –
- IETF: ja-u-sd-jp46

Amami Japanese (トン普通語, Ton-futsūgo) is a variety of the Japanese language spoken on the island of Amami Ōshima. Its native term Ton-futsūgo means "potato standard". Much like Okinawan Japanese, it is a descendant of Standard Japanese but with influences from the traditional Ryukyuan languages (in this case, Amami Japanese is influenced by the Amami Ōshima language).

== History ==
In the past, the locals of Amami Ōshima spoke the Amami Ōshima language, which belongs to the northern group of the larger Ryukyuan language family. However, as a result of Japanese assimilation policies, a language shift towards Japanese began. The same occurrence happened in the other parts of the Ryukyu Islands.

Despite Japanese becoming widespread in Amami Ōshima, a substrate from the Amami language was present. This caused the creation of Amami Japanese, known locally as Ton-futsūgo. Amami Japanese was looked down upon for much of its existence. However, in modern times, the variety is viewed positively by its speakers.

== Features ==
Amami Japanese Words
English	Amami Japanese	Standard Japanese
I, me, myself	ワン (wan)	私 (watashi)
you	ヤー (yaa)	貴方 (anata)
quotations	〜ちば (chiba)	〜って (tte)
question marker	かい (kai)	か (ka)

The last two English examples are not words on their own. They instead list the situations in which the Amami Japanese words are used. 〜ちば indicates a quote, and the word かい marks a question when placed at the end of a phrase.

== See also ==
- Kagoshima dialect
- Okinawan Japanese, the equivalent of Amami Japanese spoken on the Okinawa Islands
- Amami Ōshima language, the language that influenced this variety of Japanese
- Amami Ōshima, the island where Ton-futsūgo is spoken
