= Hōnichi dialects =

Japanese dialects of eastern Kyushu, Japan

Hōnichi Japanese
- Hōjitsu Japanese
- Native to: Japan
- Region: eastern Kyūshū
- Language family: Japonic: Japanese; Kyūshū; Hōnichi Japanese

Language codes
- ISO 639-3: –
- Glottolog: honi1246
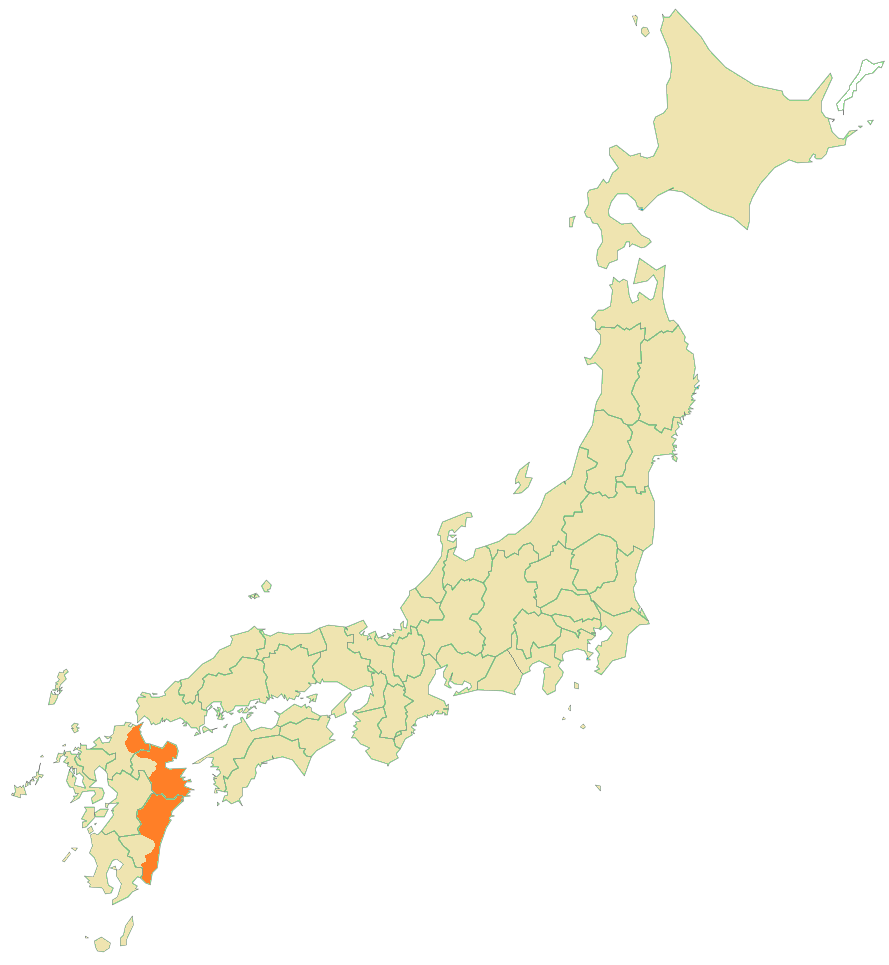
- Hōnichi dialect area (orange)

The Hōnichi dialect or Hōjitsu dialect (豊日方言, Hōnichi hōgen or Hōjitsu hōgen) is a group of the Japanese dialects spoken in eastern Kyushu. It is closer in some ways to Western Japanese (Chūgoku dialect) that it is to other Kyushu dialects. The name Hōnichi (豊日) is constructed by extracting a representative kanji from Buzen (豊前), Bungo (豊後) and Hyūga (日向), names of old provinces there.

- Hōnichi dialect
  - Ryōhō dialect
    - Buzen dialect (eastern Fukuoka Prefecture and northwestern Ōita Prefecture, formerly known as Buzen Province)
      - Kitakyūshū dialect (Kitakyūshū)
      - Nakatsu dialect (centered Nakatsu)
    - Ōita dialect (most of Ōita Prefecture)
  - Miyazaki dialect (most of Miyazaki Prefecture)

Honichi dialect does not share some features peculiar to other Kyushu dialects such as ka-adjective and batten particle. Buzen-Oita dialects do not use to particle. An emphasizing particle cha is used in Honichi dialect and Yamaguchi dialect.

In the pitch accent, Miyazaki dialect and Buzen-Oita dialects are very different. Buzen-Oita dialects use Tokyo-type accent as well as Chugoku dialect, but Miyazaki dialect is noted for its monotone accent as well as some dialects classified the Hichiku dialect. Another striking difference between Miyazaki and Buzen-Oita dialects is the particle meaning "because": while Miyazaki dialect uses kara or kai, Buzen-Oita dialects use ken or kee or kii as well as Chugoku, Shikoku and Hichiku dialects.
