= Hayakawa, Yamanashi =

Hayakawa 早川町
- Town
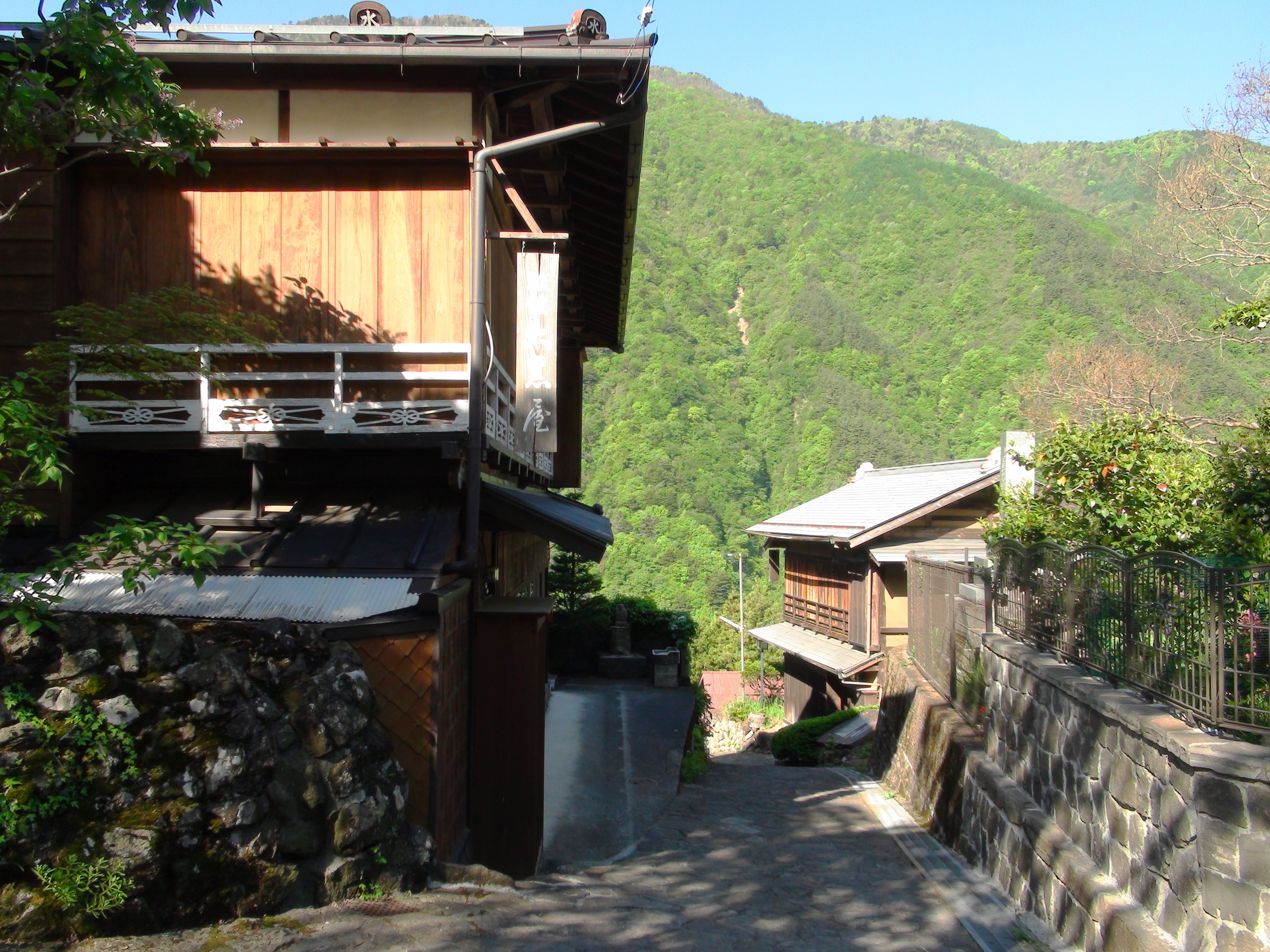
- Akasawa district in Hayakawa Town

- Flag Seal

- Location of Hayakawa in Yamanashi Prefecture

- Coordinates: 35°24′46″N 138°21′47″E
- Country: Japan
- Region: Chūbu; Tōkai
- Prefecture: Yamanashi Prefecture
- District: Minamikoma

Government
  - Mayor: Hajime Fukazawa (since November 2024)

Area
  - Total: 369.86 km^{2} (142.80 sq mi)

Population (2020)
  - Total: 1,098
  - Density: 2.969/km^{2} (7.689/sq mi)
- Time zone: UTC+9 (Japan Standard Time)
- City symbols
  - Tree: Cercidiphyllum japonicum
  - Flower: Rhododendron
  - Bird: Crested kingfisher
  - Mammal: Sika deer
- Phone number: 0556-45-2511
- Address: 758 Koju Hayakawa-cho Minimikoma-gun, Yamanashi-ken 409-2702
- Website: Official website

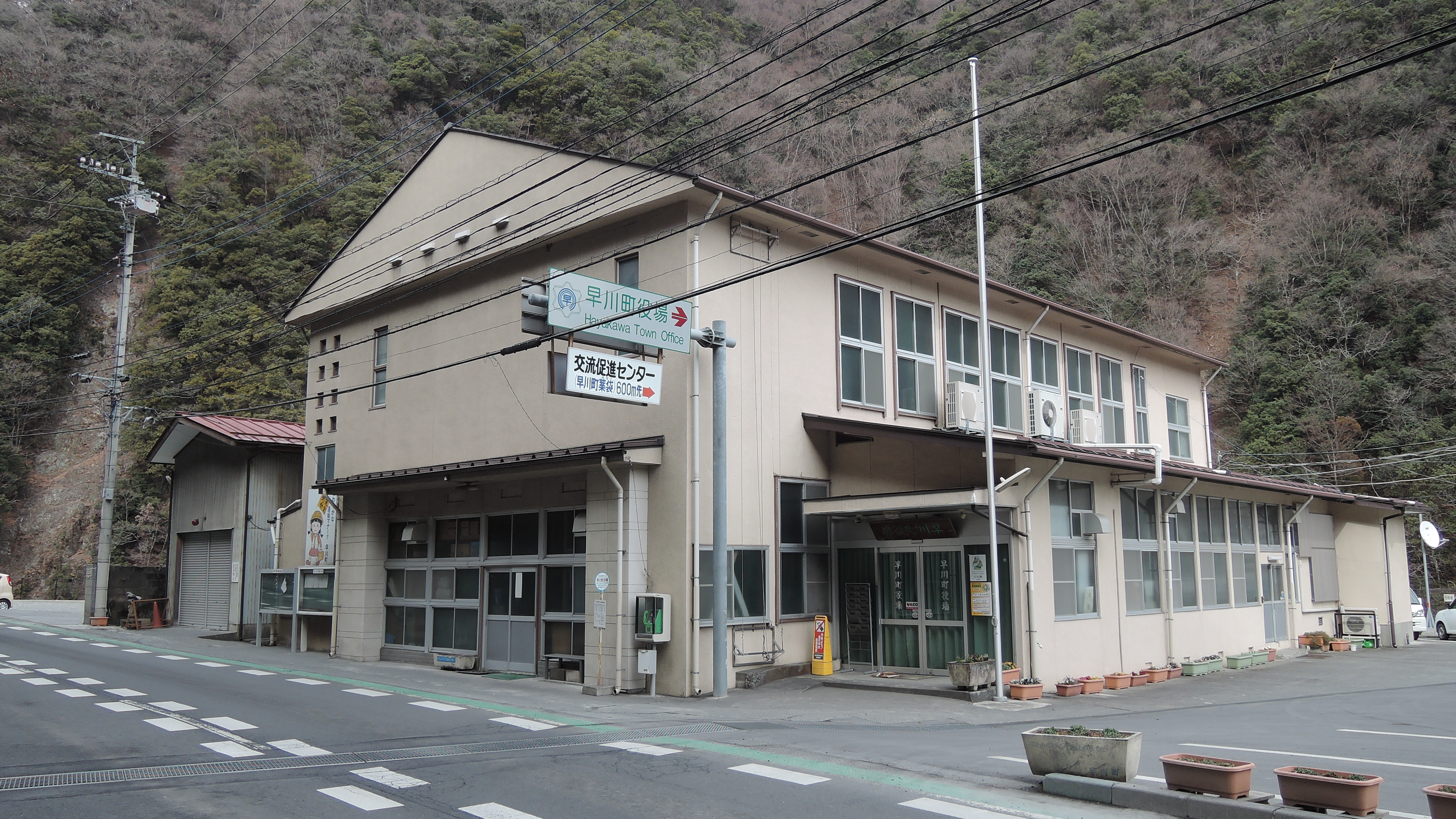
Hayakawa Town Hall

Hayakawa (早川町, Hayakawa-chō) is a town located in Yamanashi Prefecture, Japan. As of 2020, the town had an estimated population of 1,098 and a population density of 2.97 persons per km^{2}. The total area of the town is 369.86 square kilometres (142.80 sq mi). It has the smallest population of any town in Japan. Hayakawa is on the list of The Most Beautiful Villages in Japan, established in 2005.

== Geography ==
Hayakawa is located in far southwestern Yamanashi Prefecture. The Hayakawa River, a tributary of the Fuji River runs through the town. Some 96% of the town's area is covered by forest and mountains.

=== Neighboring municipalities ===
Shizuoka Prefecture

- Aoi-ku, Shizuoka

Yamanashi Prefecture

- Fujikawa
- Minami-Alps
- Minobu

=== Climate ===
The town has a climate characterized by hot and humid summers, and relatively mild winters (Köppen climate classification Cfa). The average annual temperature in Hayakawa is 13.0 °C. The average annual rainfall is 1655 mm with September as the wettest month. The temperatures are highest on average in August, at around 24.9 °C, and lowest in January, at around 1.5 °C.

== Demographics ==
Per Japanese census data, the population of Hayakawa has declined by more than 80% over the past 50 years. Over 40% of the town population shares the surname of "Mochizuki".

Historical population
Year	Pop.	±%
1940	7,143	—
1950	7,262	+1.7%
1960	10,679	+47.1%
1970	4,862	−54.5%
1980	3,005	−38.2%
1990	2,269	−24.5%
2000	1,740	−23.3%
2010	1,247	−28.3%
2020	1,098	−11.9%

== History ==
During the Edo period, all of Kai Province was tenryō territory under direct control of the Tokugawa shogunate. During the cadastral reform of the early Meiji period, the area was organized into villages under Minamikoma District, Yamanashi. The town of Hayakawa was created on September 23, 1956, through the merger of five villages of Goka, Suzurishima, Miyakogawa, Misato and Nishiyama.

== Education ==
Hayakawa has two public elementary schools and one public junior high school operated by the town government. The village does not have a high school.

== Transportation ==
=== Railway ===
The town has no passenger rail service. The nearest train station is Minobu Station on the Minobu Line, with bus services very infrequently.

=== Highway ===
Hayakawa is not served by any national highway.

== Culture ==
Until relatively recently, the village of Narada in Hayakawa was home to a language island known as the Narada dialect. Although the dialect is not in use anymore, it has had an effect on the accents of the current natives of the area.
