= Awaji dialect =

Dialect of Japanese spoken in Awaji island, Japan

- 淡路方言・淡路弁
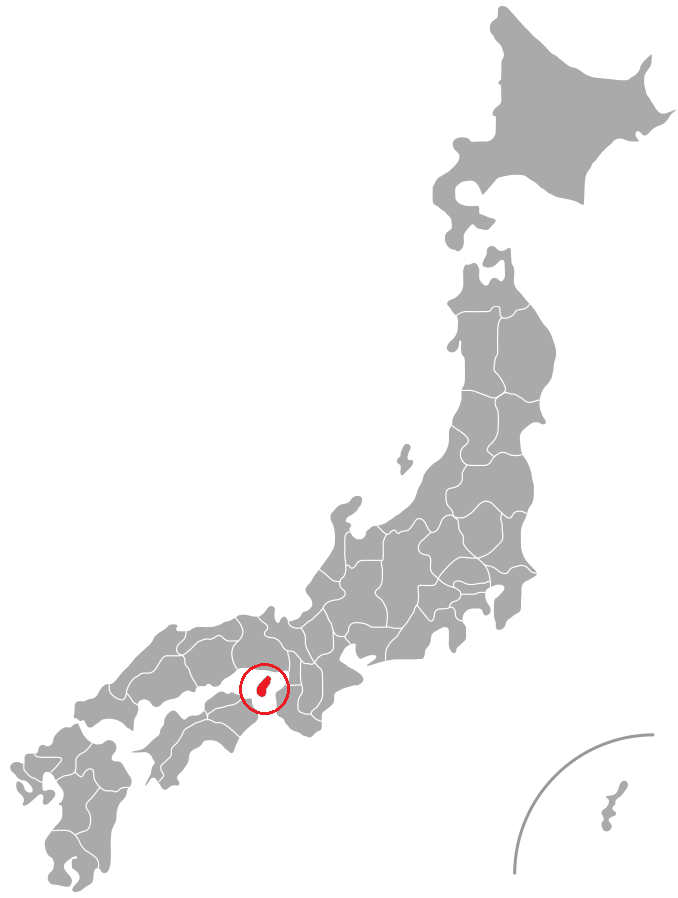
- Awaji dialect area (dark red)
- Native to: Japan
- Region: Awaji Island, Hyōgo Prefecture
- Language family: Japonic: Japanese; Western Japanese; Kansai; Southern; Awaji dialect

Language codes
- ISO 639-3: –

The Awaji dialect (淡路方言, Awaji hōgen), also called Awaji ben (淡路弁), is a dialect of Japanese spoken on Awaji Island (which comprises the cities of Sumoto, Minamiawaji, and Awaji) in the southern part of Hyōgo Prefecture. According to the introduction of "Comprehensive Study of the Kinki Region," (Note: Kinki chihō no sōgōteki kenkyū (近畿地方の総合的研究)) a publication of the National Institute for Japanese Language and Linguistics (NINJAL), titled "Subgroupings of the Kinki Dialects", (Note: Kinki hōgen no kukaku (近畿方言の区画)) the Awaji Dialect straddles the Central (typified by the pronunciation of the mora /se/ as [ɕe], use of the copula =ja, a distinction between the perfect and progressive aspects, and a migration of the monograde verb classes to the quadrigrade class (Note: Japanese Literature: Interpretation and Appreciation. Vol. 19-6, 1954, Minoru Umegaki "The reality of dialects: the Kinki region" (Note: Hōgen no jittai: kinki (方言の実態・近畿)))) and Western Kansai dialect regions. The dialect shares many features with the dialects of the cities of Osaka, Kobe, and Wakayama, which is shares the Osaka Bay with, as well as with that of Tokushima Prefecture, which exercised control (as Awa Province) over Awaji Island during the feudal period. On the other hand, it bears little resemblance to the Banshū dialect, spoken right across the Akashi Strait from the island.

== Classification ==
Tasuaki Negita (Note: Negita Tatsuaki (禰冝田竜昇)) in A Study of the Awaji Dialect (Note: Awaji hōgen no kenkyū (淡路方言の研究)) (1986, ISBN 978-4875216575) divides the Awaji dialect into Northern, Central, and Southern varieties, grouping the Northern Awaji dialect with that of the area of the former Kawachi and Yamato Provinces, Central Awaji with that of Izumi Province and Wakayama City, and Southern Awaji with that of Tokushima City.

Yamamoto Toshiharu (Note: Yamamoto Toshiharu (山本俊治)) and Yuriko Iino (Note: Iino Yuriko (飯野百合子)) in "The Dialects of Hyōgo: Their Distribution and Classification" (Note: Hyōgo hōgen - sono bunpu to bunpa (兵庫方言―その分布と分派―)) (published in The Bulletin of Mukogawa Women's University, (Note: Mukogawa joshi dai kiyō (武庫川女子大紀要)) Vol. 10, 1962) instead divide the dialect into Northern Awaji, Sumoto, and Southern Awaji, and further subdivide Northern Awaji into Eastern and Northern sub-varieties.

== Intonation and pitch accent ==
Where a gloss is given for either only Awaji dialect or standard Japanese, the other gloss is identical to the given one.

The entire island uses a Keihan type (wordtone and accent) pitch accent system. Especially among the elderly and people living in remote areas, the traditional Keihan system (which has disappeared in Kyoto, Osaka, Kobe, and most of the rest of the Kansai Region) is still to be found.

Yoichi Fujiwara noted in "Three Major Dialects of the Inland Sea Region" (Note: Seto naikai san yōchi hōgen (瀬戸内海三要地方言)) (part of Japanese Dialects of the Shōwa Period (Note: Shōwa nihongo no hōgen (昭和日本語の方言))) that the vicinity of the former Ikuwa Village (now part of the Hokudan-chō Tsuna-gun area of Awaji City) had a H-L-H type intonation (e.g., dokomade it-temo ("wherever go.concessive") would be pronounced dókòmádè ìttémò). Eiichi Murauchi (Note: Murauchi Eiichi (村内英一)) tells us that one Mrs. Koi, an elderly women from Kamaguchi (now part of the Higashiura-chō Tsuna-gun area of Awaji City) had kíkìbín ("heel") and kátàkúmà ("piggyback ride") for standard Japanese kibisu and kataguruma, respectively, and Yoshiyuki Hattori (Note: Hattori Yoshiyuki (服部敬之)) observed in 1965 an elderly woman from the Kusumoto area (now also part of Higashiura-chō Tsuna-gun) who had tsúbàkúrò ("swallow") for standard tsubame. In general, north of Gunge (part of the Ichinomiya-chō Tsuna-gun area of Awaji City) and Shizuki (part of Tsuna-chō Tsuna-gun area of Awaji City), the prosodic system includes examples not only like these, which can be found throughout the country, but a somewhat different system, found nowhere else in Hyōgo Prefecture.

== Pronunciation ==
Where a gloss is given for either only Awaji dialect or standard Japanese, the other gloss is identical to the given one.

Awaji dialect speakers, like many other speakers of rural Kansai dialects, exhibit alternations between the phonemes /d/, /z/, and /r/, between /m/ and /b/, and /b/ and /w/. Other features shared in common with such dialects include diphthong assimilation, excrescence at a compound boundary, alternations between voiced and voiceless consonants, and various euphonic changes.

To give an example of variant forms, the Sumoto variety has igok- ("move"), sabuk- ("cold"), osshe- ("teach"), kaaraa ("roof tile"), and ebesu ("provincial") for standard ugok-, samuk-, oshie-, kawara, and ebisu, respectively.

In the Yura district of Sumoto, however, a very distinctive variety of Awaji dialect, termed Yura-ben (meaning "Yura dialect"), is spoken, characterized by rapid speech and frequent sound assimilations and omissions, making it very difficult to understand (in the rest of island, only the assimilation of the diphthong /ai/ to /æː/ is common).

According to the Linguistic Atlas of Japan (Note: Nihon hōgen chizu (日本方言地図)) (a publication of NINJAL's Regional Linguistics Laboratory (Note: Kokuritsu kokugo kenkyūsho chihō gengo kenkyūshitsu (国立国語研究所地方言語研究室))), elderly people in some sections of the former towns of Midori and Nandan (now both part of Minamiawaji City) still preserved the distinction between /kw/ and /k/ and /gw/ and /g/, lost in most of the rest of the country. In addition, the map indicates a preservation of the medieval pronunciation of the mora /se/ as [ɕe] in some parts of Nandan's Fukura district.

In most Kansai dialects, when a mora other than the first of a word consisting of a consonant and a high vowel is followed immediately by a vowel or semivowel (whether word-internally or -externally), the consonant changes to one of the moraic phonemes /Q/ or /N/, (Note: /N/ is a moraic nasal whose pronunciation depends on the following (and to a lesser extent, the preceding) sound, and /Q/ causes the following consonant to become geminate) the high vowel is deleted, and the vowel or semivowel becomes /j/; the resulting sequence of /QCj/ or /NCj/ may then be subject to further changes due to the regular process of palatalization common to all Japanese dialects. This process is exemplified by the famous realization sunmyos=shat-tara assha=de nisshakas=shuki=ni ("If you want to get to Sumiyoshi, catch the Nishi-Akashi-bound [train] at Ashiya," lit. "Sumiyoshi=copula.conditional Ashiya=locative Nishi-Akashi=allative=adessive") for underlying *sumiyoshi=yat-tara ashiya=de nishiakashi=yuki=ni. In the Awaji dialect, however, this change can also affect the first mora of a word, resulting in forms like ssar- ("sit") and ssho ("salt") for standard suwar- and shio, respectively, and thus making the dialect a rare example of a Japanese variety that allows initial geminates.

== Grammar ==
Where a gloss is given for either only Awaji dialect or standard Japanese, the other gloss is identical to the given one.

Awaji dialect has the following features:

- A migration of the monograde verbal class to the quadrigrade class, originating in the Sumoto area, is currently underway. For example, okira-n ("wake up.negative-nonpast") and okire-ra-n ("wake up.passive.negative-nonpast") for standard Japanese oki-nak- ("wake up.negative") and oki-rare-nak- ("wake up.passive.negative"), respectively.
- A merger of the conclusive and adnominal for adjectival nouns. For example, kimama=na ("selfish=copula-conclusive") for standard kimama=da.
- Some speakers use the copulas =ja and =ya interchangeably. The copula =da is not used, but in Sumoto the particle =daa can be used to express the tentative mood. For example, a-n=daa ("exist.nonpast=tentative") and sha na-i=dee=ka ("it can't be helped," lit. "method exist-negative.nonpast=emphatic=interrogative") for standard ar-u=dar-oo ("exist.nonpast=copula.tentative") and sikata=dewa-na-i=ka (lit. "method=copula.negative.nonpast=interrogative"), respectively.
- The nominative particle =ga often fuses with the preceding noun. For example, am=yaa ("rain=nominative") for standard ame=ga.
- The sentence ending particle used to mark tag questions in Sumoto is =na, and =no elsewhere on the island. For example, yo-o oyog-u=naa ("good.infinitive swim.nonpast=tag question") for standard yo-ku oyog-u=ne.
- Up until the early Shōwa period, married women in Sumoto used the sentence-ending particles =zan and =kan. For example, e-e=zan ("good.nonpast=tag question") for standard i-i=n=da=ne ("good.nonpast=nominalizer=copula-conclusive=tag question").

=== Conjugation ===
The -ba of the provisional form fuses with the base of the verb; for example, kak-ya ("write.provisional") for standard kake-ba. Also, the r-row quadrigrade nonpast ending -r-u and the monograde nonpast ending -ru change to either /Q/ or /N/ when followed by some uninflected words and a few special verbs, giving forms like hashiz=zo ("run-nonpast=focus") and a-n=no=ka ("exist.nonpast=nominalizer=interrogative") for standard hashir-u=zo ("run.nonpast=focus") and ar-u=no=ka. (Note: Hyōgo Prefectural Sumoto High School Japanese Language Club (Note: Kokugo-han (国語班)) Sumoto HS Japanese and Chinese Literature (Note: Sukō kokkan (洲高国漢)) Special supplement issue "Awaji dialect - All about conjugated words and particles" (Note: Awaji hōgen - katsuyōgo to joshi ni kanshite (淡路方言―活用語と助詞に関して―)) Michio Waki, (Note: Waki Michio (脇道夫)) 1965)

=== Respectful language (敬語, Keigo) ===
Speakers of the Awaji dialect are often lambasted for not using respectful language. It has been said of the regional character of Sumoto, that since social status and socioeconomic levels do not vary much, respectful language is scarce, that people from Awaji are often heard to speak unreservedly to each other in the interest of fostering frankness among intimates, and that the use of such language may come off as cold or distant. But the Awaji dialect certainly does not lack respectful forms intrinsically. Although the dialect has its own rich inventory of such expressions, due to the diffusion of respectful forms from Standard Japanese on the island, they are in the process of disappearing.

=== Respectful verbs and auxiliaries ===
==== Honorific expressions (尊敬語, Sonkeigo) ====
- infinitive (連用形, Ren'yōkei) + -nahar- (quadrigrade conjugation). Equivalent to standard infinitive + -nasar-. Also equivalent to related Osaka dialect infinitive + -har-.
- gerund (Note: i.e., "te-form.") + -tsuka. Equivalent to standard gerund + -kudasa-i. Derived from Middle Japanese tukapasa-re-yo ("send.passive.imperative"). Also used in the Shikoku dialects. Equivalent to related San'yō dialect gerund + -tsukaasa-i.
- gerund + -tsukahar- (quadrigrade conjugation). Equivalent to standard gerund + -kudasar-. A composite of the above two.
- infinitive + -nas-i-ta. Equivalent to standard infinitive + -nasar-e-ta.
- gerund + -hairyo. Equivalent to standard gerund + -kudasa-i. Also used in the Shikoku dialects.
- gerund + -okure. Equivalent to standard gerund + -kure.

==== Humble expressions (謙譲語, Kenjōgo) ====
- ang-yo. Equivalent to standard age-mash-ō.
- euphonic (Note: The stem that exhibits euphonic changes, used to form the gerund and other forms that historically derive from it, such as the past tense, the conditional, and the concessive.) + -t-ang-yo. Equivalent to standard euphonic + -t-age-mash-ō.

==== Polite expressions (丁寧語, Teineigo) ====
- infinitive + -mash-o. Equivalent to standard infinitive + -mash-ō.
- =desse. Equivalent to standard =des-u-yo. Also used in Osaka dialect.
- omas- (quadrigrade conjugation). Polite equivalent for the verb ar- ("exist"). Also used in Osaka dialect.
- irrealis (未然形, Mizenkei) + -n-se. Equivalent to standard infinitive + -mash-ō. Nushima women's language. An example of an ancient form preserved on an outlying island.

=== Other types of respectful language ===
In polite language, the forms a-z=ze ("exist.nonpast=focus") and a-k=kana ("exist.nonpast=speculative") are preferred to a-z=zo and a-k=ka ("exist.nonpast=interrogative") for standard ar-u=yo and ar-u=ka, respectively. Also, the choice of the honorific prefix go= or o= is governed by the same rules as in the standard language, so kigen=ya e-e=ka ("Are [you] in a good mood?", lit. "mood=topic good.nonpast=interrogative") becomes go=kigen=ya o=yoroshi-i=kana (lit. "honorific=mood=topic honorific=good-polite-nonpast=speculative"), for standard kigen=wa i-i=ka and go=kigen=wa o=yoroshi-i=kana, respectively.

Of course, when in Standard Japanese a speaker would attach the suffix -san to a person's name, in Awaji dialect the suffix -han is used instead, just as in the Osaka dialect.

== Vocabulary ==
Where a gloss is given for either only Awaji dialect or standard Japanese, the other gloss is identical to the given one.

=== Influence from surroundings ===
The variations of the island's regions are such that it is difficult to talk of a single, unified Awaji dialect. The lineages of Kobe and Osaka, Kii, Awa are mixed together in the vocabulary and grammar of the dialect. To take the standard mi-na-i ("see.negative.nonpast") as an example, the Kobe/Osaka forms mii-hen and mi-yahen are found in the vicinity of the former Tsuna District and in the Aiga and Nakagawa sections of Sumoto City, the Kii forms mi-n and mi-yan are found in Sumoto's Yura and Nada neighborhoods, the Nada neighborhood of the Nandan-chō Mihara-gun section of Minamiawaji City, and on Nushima, and the Awa form mi-yasen (all "see.negative-nonpast") is found in the rest of the former Mihara District and within the original boundaries of the City of Sumoto, and there are even areas of Sumoto and southern Goshiki where the Kobe/Osaka and Awa forms are found in free variation. (Note: Tatsuaki Negita A Record of the Awaji Dialect (Note: Awaji hōgen no kiroku (淡路方言の記録)) 1983) One place where the vocabulary is relatively average or even meager is the island's largest city, Sumoto, in the so-called "Sumoto Dialect" spoken within the old boundaries of the city. Conversely, it is within the very same city, in the Yura neighborhood, where what may be the island's most characteristic variety, the aforementioned Yura Dialect, is spoken.

In most Kansai dialects, the word aho ("idiot") is seen for standard baka, and the Awaji dialect is no exception, but in Hokudan one also find chage (realized [tɕaŋe]) with the same meaning. The form kichanak- ("dirty") is common for standard kitanak-, and particularly in northern region the form chanak- or the alternative word yosowashik- are also found. The dialects of Kyoto/Osaka/Kobe, Wakayama, and Okayama have retained the word senchi ("restroom"), replaced in the standard language by benjo, and in Awaji this has become sencha; the dialects of Sumoto's Yura and Nada sections also have the forms hako and nbako.

Throughout Hokudan and in parts of Higashiura expressions reminiscent of those of the Kawachi dialect, such as yo-o ki-ta=noo ware ("welcome," lit. "good.infinitive come.past=tag question you") and sonna koto s-uk=ka re ("don't do that," lit. "that sort of thing do.nonpast=interrogative you") for standard yok-u ki-ta=nee, omae=wa (lit. "good.infinitive come.past=tag question, you=topic") and sonna koto s-uru=kai, omae=wa ("that sort of thing do.nonpast=interrogative, you=topic"), respectively, can be seen.

The reason that Awaji shares forms and vocabulary with such geographically distant regions as Settsu, Izumi, and Kawachi is that from ancient times a bilateral trade of goods and culture flourished, and the activities of the Nojima and Mihara fisherman (groups that once inhabited the island and that are mentioned in the earliest chronicles of Japan), who moved between Naniwa and Yamato, is noted in the historical record. As for the connection to Awa, the island was during the Edo Period ruled over by the Tokushima Domain.

=== A dialect at the center of the Inland Sea ===
As the Seto Inland Sea has from time immemorial served to connect Kyushu and the Kinai by sea, it has played a very important role in Japanese history. New words from the capital area leaving Honshu for the West first had to stop over in Awaji. Through absorbing all of this new vocabulary so quickly, the island, along with others in its vicinity such as Shōdo and Shimada and Ōge in the Naruto Strait, constituted a remarkable dialect sprachbund (an area where dialects share linguistic features, in this case vocabulary, because of extensive contact despite not necessarily being closely related). For standard takenoko-gasa (a type of conical hat made from weaving together bamboo sheaths, lit. "bamboo shoot.hat"), we find words such as taiko-gasa and taiko-bachi disseminated throughout the Seto, and the word chinchiro ("pinecone") for standard matsukasa, pervasive in mainland Kansai, has also spread to Awaji and the islands in the open sea around the Naruto.

Under the influence of this state of affairs, Awaji Island has had a strong tendency to be isolated on the periphery. Examples of vocabulary items found only on the island are hotoke=no uma ("praying mantis," lit. "buddha.genitive horse"), for standard kamakiri ("praying mantis"), hi=ater-i ame ("sunshower," lit. "sun=expose.nominalizer rain") for standard hi=der-i ame (lit. "sun=shine.nominalizer rain"), and hidari=ete ("left-handed," lit. "left=forte") for standard hidari=kik-i (lit. "left=effective.nominalizer"). In addition to these Awaji-specific forms, the dialect also has forms found in other places, such as iari ("ant") for standard ari, also found in Kyushu, and even as new words develop or are taken in from elsewhere, there is a still a tendency to preserve the old forms.

== See also ==
- Awaji Province
- Banshū dialect
- Kishū dialect
- Awa dialect
- Sanuki dialect
