= Iyo dialect =

Japanese dialect

- Iyo-ben
- Native to: Japan
- Region: Ehime
- Language family: Japonic: Japanese; Western Japanese; Shikoku; Iyo dialect

Language codes
- ISO 639-3: –
- Glottolog: iyob1237
- IETF: ja-u-sd-jp38

The Iyo dialect (伊予弁, Iyo-ben) of Japanese is spoken by people from Ehime Prefecture in Japan. The name is a remnant of the Ehime area's historical name, Iyo Province.

Accents vary somewhat by geography within the prefecture. The southern area is particularly influenced by the Kyūshū dialect, while the central and eastern districts have accents similar to Kansai dialect.

== Characteristics ==
The Iyo dialect has numerous characteristics that differentiate it from standard Japanese grammar.

- ya (や) replaces da (だ) as the plain form attributive copula, much like in the dialects of Hakata and Kansai
- ken (けん) replaces kara (から) as in "because"

- yaken (やけん) is used instead of dakara (だから)

- oru (おる) replaces iru (いる) as the verb "to be" for animate objects in casual usage

This leads to two alternate conjugations of the continuative form (～ている -te iru):
- -toru (～とる) is a contraction of -te oru
- V-stem + -yoru (～よる) is a slurring of oru
Example: "What are you doing?" (何してるの？ nani shiteru no? in standard Japanese) becomes either
- nani shitoru no? (何しとるの？) or
- nani shiyoru no? (何しよるの？)

- n (ん) as a contraction of sentence-final no (の)

Example: The second "What are you doing?" above, nani shiyoru no? is often contracted to nani shiyon? (何しよん？) or nani shon? (何しょん？)

- ya and wai (わい) can be emphatic sentence-final particles, like yo (よ)
- Negative potential forms ("can't X") are sometimes expressed as yō + V-neg. (yō is an alternative form of 良く yoku which underwent the u-onbin found in many western Japanese dialects, so more literally it is, "well/often don't X")

Example: "Can't do" (できない dekinai in standard Japanese) becomes yō sen (ようせん）

"Can't go" (行けない ikenai in standard Japanese) becomes yō ikan （よう行かん)

- Especially among the elderly, kogai (こがい), sogai (そがい), and dogai (どがい) are used for "this (kind of~)", "that (kind of~)", and "which (kind of~)", respectively (konna こんな, sonna そんな, donna どんな in standard Japanese).
- zonamoshi (ぞなもし) is the most famous sentence-final particle of Iyo dialect due to being used in Botchan, a famous novel by Natsume Sōseki, but the usage is now obsolete.

=== Regional variations ===
These patterns are found mostly in the Nanyo (southern) region:

- ga (が) replaces no (の) in some contexts:

- "Explanatory/inquisitive no" — "What are you doing?" (何してるの？ nani shiteru no? in standard Japanese) becomes nani shiteru ga? (何してるが？)

In combination with the alternate form of the continuative mentioned above, this is usually rendered as nani shiyoru ga? (何しよるが？)

- "Although -noni" (～のに) — "But that's what you said!" (そう言ったのに！ sō itta noni! in standard Japanese) becomes sō itta gani! (そう言ったがに！)

- Especially in Yawatahama, -teya (てや) is an emphatic suffix, usually seen in sōteya (そうてや), which is equivalent to sōdayo (そうだよ)

This is thought to be a contraction along the lines of sō ya to itta ya → sō yatte ya → sōteya

== Vocabulary ==
Some of the vocabulary in the dialect is readily understandable by speakers of standard Japanese, but many items are so different as to cause significant confusion. An example often proffered by locals is kaku かく, "to move/carry". For instance, it might be used in the context of a classroom—"Move your desk" (机をかいて tsukue o kaite). This would be incomprehensible to a non-local; a speaker of standard Japanese would interpret this as either "draw a desk" or "scratch your desk".

Iyo dialect vocabulary
| Iyo dialect | Standard Japanese | English |
|---|---|---|
| いぬ (inu) | 去る | to go away |
| かく (kaku) | 担ぐ | to carry/to shoulder |
| おらぶ (orabu) | 叫ぶ | to shout |
| 行きし | 行く途中 | currently going/en route |
| 帰りし | 帰る途中 | currently returning |
| 帰ってこーわい | 帰ります | to go back/go home |
| 行ってこーわい | 行ってきます | "I'm leaving" |
| かまん (kaman) | 良い/構わない | good |
| もげる(mogeru) | はずれる (hazureru) | to be disconnected |
| つい (tsui) | 同じ/いっしょ (issho) | the same |
| たいぎぃ (taigii) | しんどい/面倒くさい (shindoi) | tiring/bothersome |
| ぬくい (nukui) | あたたかい (atatakai) | warm, mild |
| むぐ (mugu) | むく (muku) | to peel, to skin |
