= Sanuki =

Sanuki is a placename that may mean:

- Sanuki, Kagawa, a city in Kagawa Prefecture, Japan
- Sanuki Province, a former province of Japan with the same boundaries as modern Kagawa Prefecture
- Sanuki Station, a train station located in Ryūgasaki, Ibaraki, Japan
- Sanuki dialect
