= Kansai dialect =

Japanese dialect

Kansai Japanese
- 関西弁
- Pronunciation: [q͡χɑ̃ɰ̃sɑ̟ivẽꜜɴ]
- Native to: Japan
- Region: Kansai
- Language family: Japonic: Japanese; Western Japanese; Kansai Japanese

Language codes
- ISO 639-3: –
- Glottolog: kink1238
- Kansai-dialect area

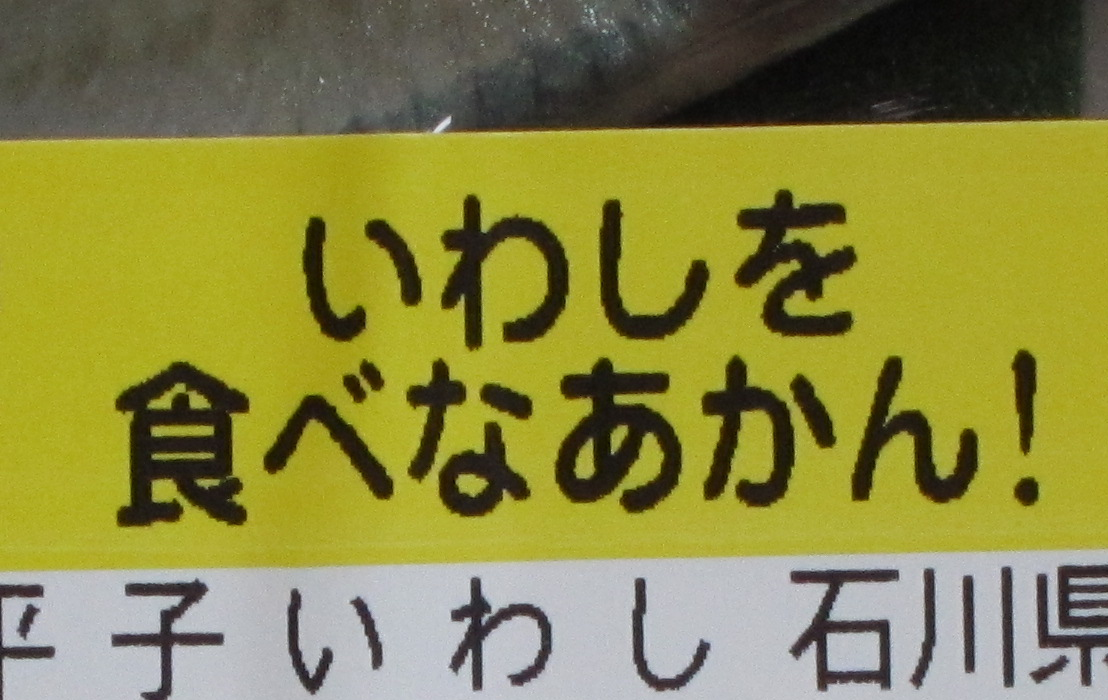
A label in Kansai dialect. The advertisement, Iwashi o tabena akan!, translates as "You must eat sardines!"

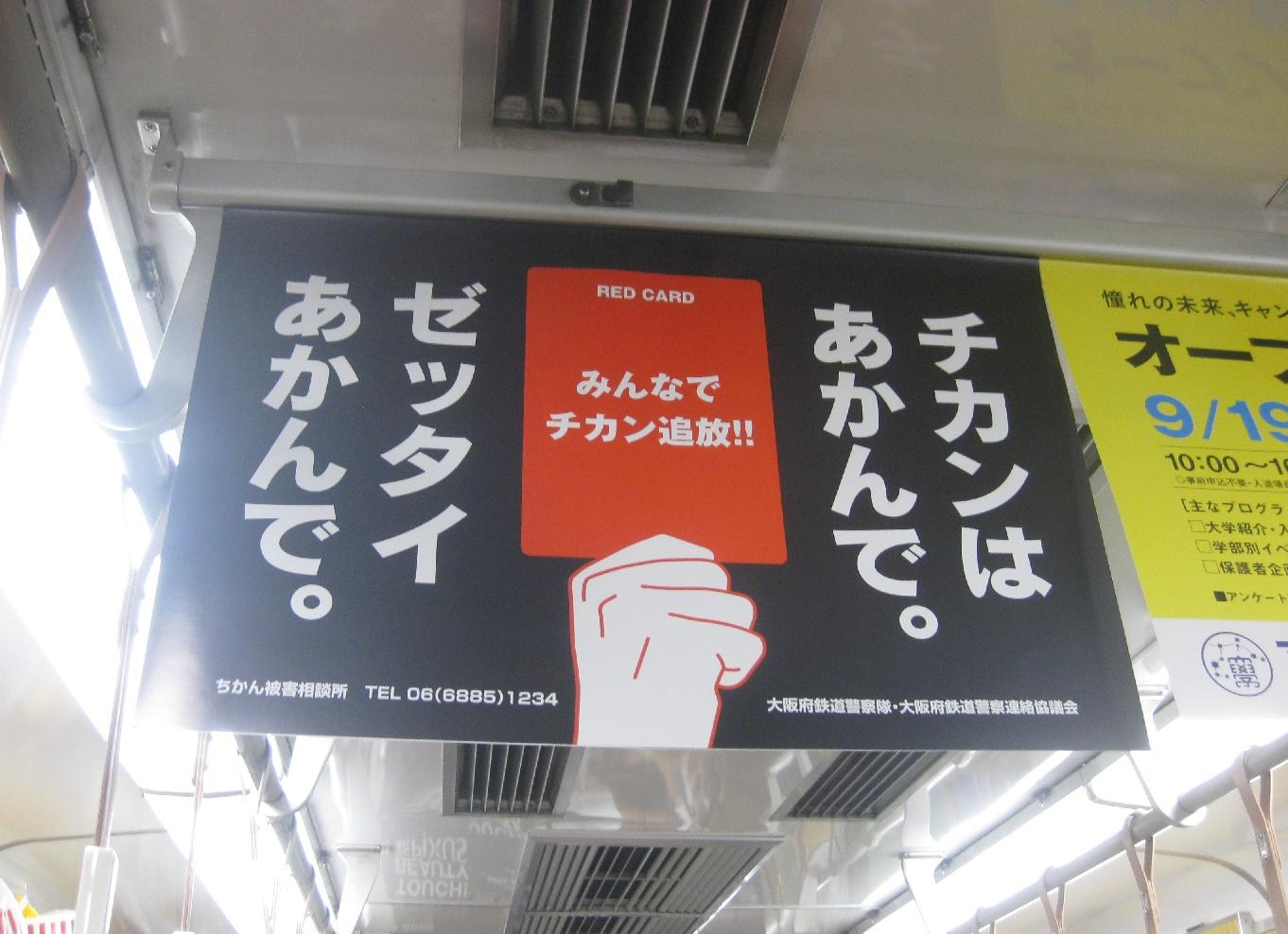
A poster written in Kansai dialect. The warning, Chikan wa akan de. Zettai akan de, translates as "Groping is forbidden. Absolutely forbidden."

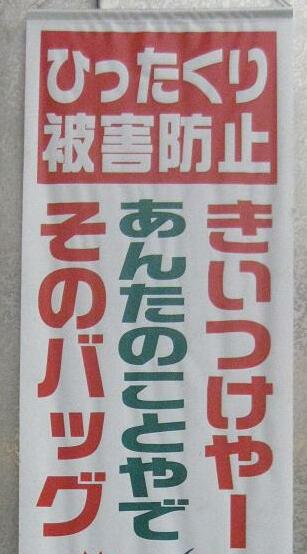
A caution written in Kansai dialect. The warning, Kii tsuke yā, Anta no koto ya de, Sono baggu, translates as "Take care! Do not let your bag get snatched!"

The Kansai dialect (関西弁・関西方言, Kansai-ben, Kansai hōgen; Japanese pronunciation: [kaɰ̃.sai.beɴ, kaɰ̃.sai hoː.ɡeꜜɴ, -ŋeꜜɴ, kaɰ̃.sai hoꜜː.ɡeɴ, -ŋeɴ]) is a group of Japanese dialects in the Kansai region (Kinki region) of Japan. In Japanese, Kansai-ben is the common name and it is called Kinki dialect (近畿方言, Kinki-hōgen) in technical terms. The dialects of Kyoto and Osaka are known as Kamigata dialect (上方言葉, Kamigata kotoba; or Kamigata-go (上方語)), and were particularly referred to as such in the Edo period.

The Kansai dialect is typified by the speech of Osaka, the major city of Kansai, referred to as Osaka-ben. It is characterized as more melodic and harsher by speakers of standard Japanese.

== Background ==
Since Osaka is the largest city in the region and its speakers received the most media exposure over the last century, non-Kansai-dialect speakers tend to associate the dialect of Osaka with the entire Kansai region. However, technically, Kansai dialect is not a single dialect but a group of related dialects in the region. Each major city and prefecture has a particular dialect, and residents take some pride in their particular dialectal variations.

The common Kansai dialect is spoken in Keihanshin (the metropolitan areas of the cities of Kyoto, Osaka and Kobe) and its surroundings, a radius of about 50 km (31 mi) around the Osaka-Kyoto-Kobe area (see regional differences). This article mainly discusses variations in Keihanshin during the 20th and 21st centuries.

Even in the Kansai region, away from Keihanshin and its surrounding areas, there are dialects that differ from the characteristics generally considered to be Kansai dialect-like. Tajima and Tango (except Maizuru) dialects in northwest Kansai are too different to be regarded as Kansai dialects and are thus usually included in the Chūgoku dialect. Dialects spoken in Southeastern Kii Peninsula including Totsukawa and Owase are also far different from other Kansai dialects, and considered a language island. The Shikoku dialect and the Hokuriku dialect share similarities with the Kansai dialects, but are classified separately.

== History ==
External videos
- Taxi (YouTube); An example of a skit in Osaka dialect performed by Nakagawake.

The Kansai dialect has over a thousand years of history. When Kinai cities such as Heijō-kyō (Nara), Naniwa-kyō (Osaka) and Heian-kyō (Kyoto) were Imperial capitals, the Kinai dialect, the ancestor of the Kansai dialect, was the de facto standard Japanese. It had an influence on all of the nation including the Edo dialect, the predecessor of modern Tokyo dialect. The literature style developed by the intelligentsia in Heian-kyō became the model of Classical Japanese language.

When the political and military center of Japan was moved to Edo under the Tokugawa Shogunate and the Kantō region grew in prominence, the Edo dialect took the place of the Kansai dialect. With the Meiji Restoration and the transfer of the imperial capital from Kyoto to Tokyo, the Kansai dialect became fixed in position as a provincial dialect. See also Early Modern Japanese.

As the Tokyo dialect was adopted with the advent of a national education/media standard in Japan, some features of the Kansai dialect have diminished and changed. However, Kansai is the second most populated urban region in Japan after Kantō, with a population of about 20 million, so Kansai dialect is still the most widely spoken, known and influential non-standard Japanese dialect. The Kansai dialect's idioms are sometimes introduced into other dialects and even standard Japanese. Many Kansai people are attached to their own speech and have strong regional rivalry against Tokyo.

Since the Taishō period, the manzai form of Japanese comedy has been developed in Osaka, and a large number of Osaka-based comedians have appeared in Japanese media with Osaka dialect (See also Yoshimoto Kogyo). Because of such associations, Kansai speakers are often viewed as being more "funny" or "talkative" than typical speakers of other dialects. Tokyo people even occasionally imitate the Kansai dialect to provoke laughter or inject humor.

== Phonology ==
In phonetic terms, Kansai dialect is characterized a lack of vowel reduction, in contrast with Tokyo dialect that often reduces vowels but emphasizes consonants, but the basis of the phonemes is similar. The specific phonetic differences between Kansai and Tokyo are as follows:

=== Vowels ===
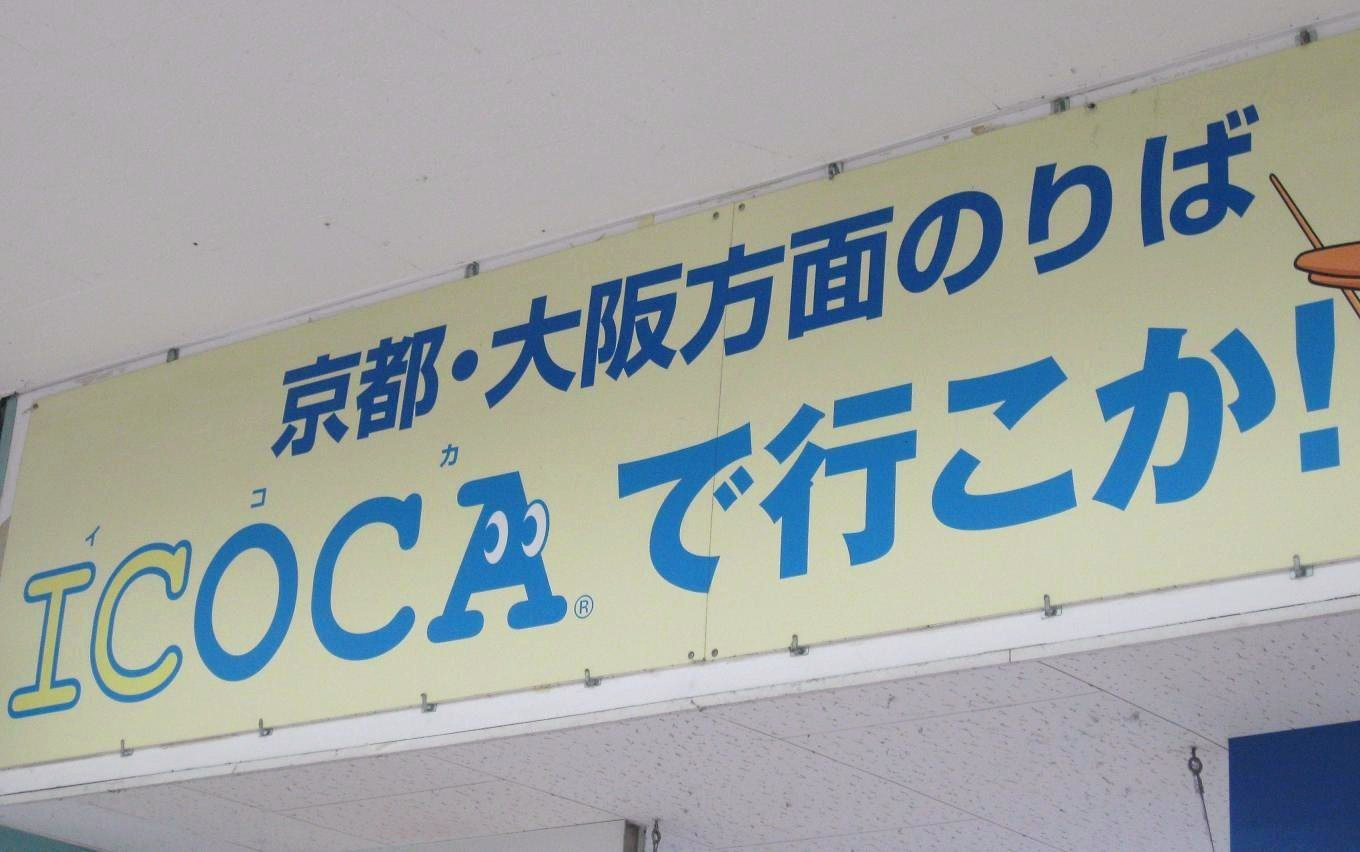
A signboard written in Kansai dialect at Kusatsu Station in Kusatsu, Shiga. The message, ICOCA de iko ka!, translates as "Let's go with ICOCA!" ICOCA is a rechargeable contactless smart card. Its name is a play on the Kansai phrase "iko ka!" ("Let's go!").

- /u/ is nearer to [u] than to [ɯ].
- Vowel reduction frequently occurs in Standard Japanese, but is rare in the Kansai dialect. For example, the polite copula desu (です) is pronounced nearly as [des] in standard Japanese, but Kansai speakers tend to pronounce it distinctly as [desu] or even [desuː].
- In some registers, such as informal Tokyo speech, hiatuses /ai, ae, oi/ often fuse into /eː/, as in うめえ /umeː/ and すげえ /suɡeː/ instead of 旨い /umai/ "yummy" and 凄い /suɡoi/ "great", but /ai, ae, oi/ are usually pronounced distinctly in Kansai dialect. In Wakayama, /ei/ is also pronounced distinctly; it usually fuses into /eː/ in standard Japanese and almost all other dialects.
- A recurring tendency to lengthen vowels at the end of monomoraic nouns. Common examples are /kiː/ for 木 /ki/ "tree", /kaː/ for 蚊 /ka/ "mosquito" and /meː/ for 目 /me/ "eye".
- Contrarily, long vowels in Standard inflections are sometimes shortened. This is particularly noticeable in the volitional conjugation of verbs. For instance, "行こうか？" /ikoː ka/ meaning "shall we go?" is shortened in Kansai to "行こか？" /iko ka/. The common phrase of agreement, "そうだ" /soː da/ meaning "that's it", is replaced "そや" /so ja/ or even "せや" /se ja/ in Kansai.
- When vowels and semivowel /j/ follow /i, e/, they sometimes palatalize with /N/ or /Q/. For example, "好きやねん" /sukija neN/ "I love you" becomes '好っきゃねん' /suQkja neN/, 日曜日 /nitijoːbi/ "Sunday" becomes にっちょうび /niQtjoːbi/ and 賑やか /niɡijaka/ "lively, busy" becomes にんぎゃか /niNɡjaka/.

=== Consonants ===
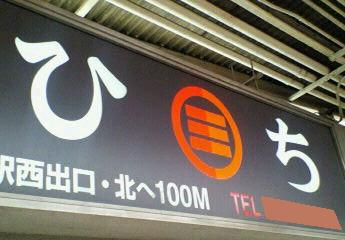
A pawnshop signboard in Osaka

- The syllable ひ /hi/ is nearer to [hi] than to [çi].
- The yotsugana are two distinct syllables, as they are in Tokyo, but Kansai speakers tend to pronounce じ /zi/ and ず /zu/ as [ʑi] and [zu] in place of Standard [dʑi] and [dzɯ].
- Intervocalic /ɡ/ is pronounced either [ŋ] or [ɡ] in free variation, but [ŋ] is declining now.
- In provocative speech, /r/ becomes [r], similar to the Tokyo Shitamachi dialect.
- The use of /h/ in place of /s/. Some debuccalization of /s/ is apparent in most Kansai speakers, but it seems to have progressed more in morphological suffixes and inflections than in core vocabulary. This process has produced はん /-haN/ for さん -san "Mr., Ms.", まへん /-maheN/ for ません /-maseN/ (formal negative form), まひょ /-mahjo/ for ましょう /-masjoː/ (formal volitional form), and ひちや /hiti-ja/ for 質屋 /siti-ja/ "pawnshop", among other examples.
- The change of /m/ and /b/ in some words such as さぶい /sabui/ for 寒い /samui/ "cold".
- Especially in the rural areas, /z, d, r/ are sometimes harmonized or metathesized. For example, でんでん /deNdeN/ for 全然 /zeNzeN/ "never, not at all", かだら /kadara/ or からら /karara/ for 体 /karada/ "body". A play on words around these sound changes goes as follows: 淀川の水飲んれ腹らら下りや /joroɡawa no miru noNre hara rarakurari ja/ for 淀川の水飲んで腹だだ下りや /jodoɡawa no mizu noNde hara dadakudari ja/ "I drank water of Yodo River and have the trots".
- The /r/ + vowel in the verb conjugations is sometimes changed to /N/, similar to colloquial Tokyo speech. For example, 何してるねん？ /nani siteru neN/ "What are you doing?" often changes to 何してんねん？ /nani siteN neN/ in fluent Kansai speech.

=== Pitch accent ===
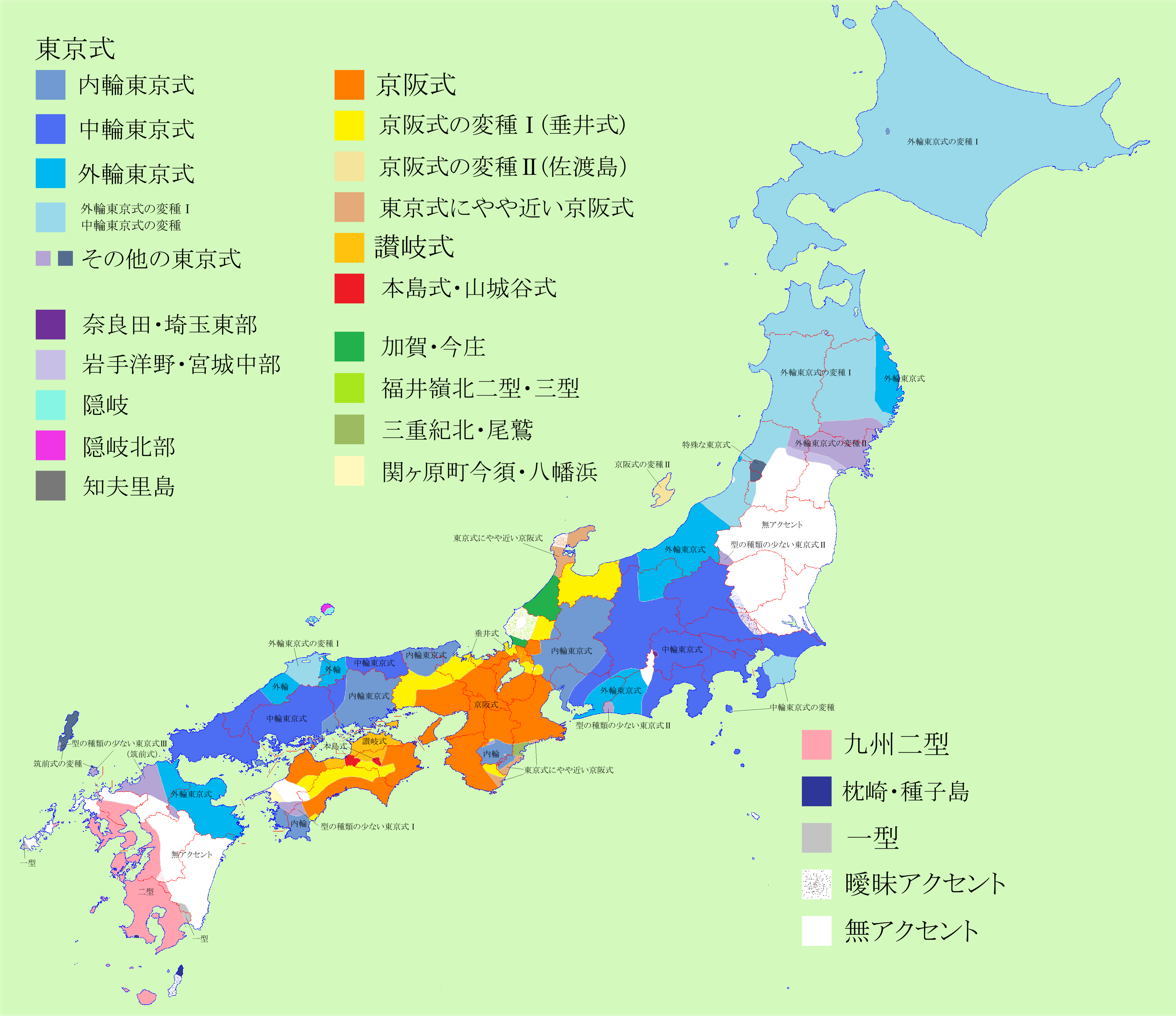
Map of Japanese pitch accents. The Kyoto-Osaka type accent is used in the orange area while the Tokyo type accent is used in the blue area.

The pitch accent in Kansai dialect is very different from the standard Tokyo accent, so non-Kansai Japanese can recognize Kansai people easily from that alone. The Kansai pitch accent is called the Kyoto-Osaka type accent (京阪式アクセント, Keihan-shiki akusento) in technical terms. It is used in most of Kansai, Shikoku and parts of western Chūbu region. The Tokyo accent distinguishes words only by the position of an optional pitch drop, whereas the Kansai accent distinguishes words also by initial tones, so Kansai dialect has more pitch patterns than standard Japanese. In the Tokyo accent, the pitch between first and second morae usually changes, but in the Kansai accent, it does not always.

Below is a list of simplified Kansai accent patterns. H represents a high pitch and L represents a low pitch.

1. High-initial accent (高起式, kōki-shiki) or Flat-straight accent (平進式, Heishin-shiki)
  - The high pitch appears on the first mora and the others are low: H-L, H-L-L, H-L-L-L, etc.
  - The high pitch continues for the set mora and the rest are low: H-H-L, H-H-L-L, H-H-H-L, etc.
  - The high pitch continues to the last: H-H, H-H-H, H-H-H-H, etc.
2. Low-initial accent (低起式, teiki-shiki) or Ascent accent (上昇式, Jōshō-shiki)
  - The pitch rises drastically on the middle set mora and falls again: L-H-L, L-H-L-L, L-L-H-L, etc.
  - The pitch rises drastically on the last mora: L-L-H, L-L-L-H, L-L-L-L-H, etc.
    - If high-initial accent words or particles attach to the end of the word, all morae are low: L-L-L(-H), L-L-L-L(-H), L-L-L-L-L(-H)
  - With two-mora words, there are two accent patterns. Both of these tend to be realized in recent years as L-H, L-H(-L).
    - The second mora rises and falls quickly. If words or particles attach to the end of the word, the fall is sometimes not realized: L-HL, L-HL(-L) or L-H(-L)
    - The second mora does not fall. If high-initial words or particles attach to the end of the word, both morae are low: L-H, L-L(-H)

| | | Kansai | Tokyo | English |
|---|---|---|---|---|
| hashi | 橋 | H-L | L-H(-L) | bridge |
| hashi | 箸 | L-H | H-L | chopsticks |
| hashi | 端 | H-H | L-H(-H) | edge |
| Nihon | 日本 | H-L-L | L-H-L | Japan |
| nihon | 二本 | L-L-H | H-L-L | 2-hon |
| konnichiwa | こんにちは | L-H-L-L-H | L-H-H-H-H | hello |
| arigatō | ありがとう | L-L-L-H-L | L-H-L-L-L | thanks |

== Grammar ==
Many words and grammar structures in Kansai dialect are contractions of their classical Japanese equivalents (it is unusual to contract words in such a way in standard Japanese). For example, chigau (to be different or wrong) becomes chau, yoku (well) becomes yō, and omoshiroi (interesting or funny) becomes omoroi. These contractions follow similar inflection rules as their standard forms, so chau said politely is chaimasu in the same way as chigau is inflected to chigaimasu.

=== Verbs ===
Kansai dialect also has two types of regular verb, 五段 godan verbs (-u verbs) and 一段 ichidan verbs (-ru verbs), and two irregular verbs, 来る /kuru/ ("to come") and する /suru/ ("to do"), but some conjugations are different from standard Japanese.

The geminated consonants found in godan verbs of standard Japanese verbal inflections are usually replaced with long vowels (often shortened in 3 morae verbs) in Kansai dialect (See also Onbin, u-onbin). Thus, for the verb 言う /iu, juː/ ("to say"), the past tense in standard Japanese 言った /iQta/ ("said") becomes 言うた /juːta/ in Kansai dialect. This particular verb is emblematic of a native Kansai speaker, as most will unconsciously say 言うて /juːte/ instead of 言って /iQte/ or /juQte/ even if well-practiced at speaking in standard Japanese. Other examples of geminate replacement are 笑った /waraQta/ ("laughed") becoming 笑うた /waroːta/ or わろた /warota/ and 貰った /moraQta/ ("received") becoming 貰うた /moroːta/, もろた /morota/ or even もうた /moːta/.

An auxiliary verb -てしまう /-te simau/ (to finish something or to do something in unintentional or unfortunate circumstances) is contracted to -ちまう /-timau/ or -ちゃう /-tjau/ in colloquial Tokyo speech but to -てまう /-temau/ in Kansai speech. Thus, しちまう /sitimau/, or しちゃう /sitjau/, becomes してまう /sitemau/. Furthermore, as the verb しまう /simau/ is affected by the same sound changes as in other 五段 godan verbs, the past tense of this form is rendered as -てもうた /-temoːta/ or -てもた /-temota/ rather than -ちまった /-timaQta/ or -ちゃった /-tjaQta/: 忘れちまった /wasuretimaQta/ or 忘れちゃった /wasuretjaQta/ ("I forgot [it]") in Tokyo is 忘れてもうた /wasuretemoːta/ or 忘れてもた /wasuretemota/ in Kansai.

The long vowel of the volitional form is often shortened; for example, 使おう /tukaoː/ (the volitional form of tsukau) becomes 使お /tukao/, 食べよう /tabejoː/ (the volitional form of 食べる /taberu/) becomes 食べよ /tabejo/. The irregular verb する /suru/ has special volitional form しょ（う） /sjo(ː)/ instead of しよう /sijoː/. The volitional form of another irregular verb 来る /kuru/ is 来よう /kojoː/ as well as the standard Japanese, but when 来る /kuru/ is used as an auxiliary verb -てくる /-te kuru/, -てこよう /-te kojoː/ is sometimes replaced with -てこ（う） /-te ko(ː)/ in Kansai.

The causative verb ending /-aseru/ is usually replaced with /-asu/ in Kansai dialect; for example, させる /saseru/ (causative form of /suru/) changes さす /sasu/, 言わせる /iwaseru/ (causative form of 言う /juː/) changes 言わす /iwasu/. Its -te form /-asete/ and perfective form /-aseta/ change to /-asite/ and /-asita/; they also appear in transitive ichidan verbs such as 見せる /miseru/ ("to show"), e.g. 見して /misite/ for 見せて /misete/.

The potential verb endings /-eru/ for 五段 godan and -られる /-rareru/ for 一段 ichidan, recently often shortened -れる /-reru/ (ra-nuki kotoba), are common between the standard Japanese and Kansai dialect. For making their negative forms, it is only to replace -ない /-nai/ with -ん /-N/ or -へん /-heN/ (See Negative). However, mainly in Osaka, potential negative form of 五段 godan verbs /-enai/ is often replaced with /-areheN/ such as 行かれへん /ikareheN/ instead of 行けない /ikenai/ and 行けへん /ikeheN/ "can't go". This is because /-eheN/ overlaps with Osakan negative conjugation. In western Japanese including Kansai dialect, a combination of an adverb よう /joː/ and -ん /-N/ negative form is used as a negative form of the personal impossibility such as よう言わん /joː iwaN/ "I can't say anything (in disgust or diffidence)".

==== Existence verbs ====
In Standard Japanese, the verb iru is used for reference to the existence of an animate object, and iru is replaced with oru in humble language and some written language. In western Japanese, oru is used not only in humble language but also in all other situations instead of iru.

Kansai dialect belongs to western Japanese, but いる /iru/ and its variation, いてる /iteru/ (mainly Osaka), are used in Osaka, Kyoto, Shiga and so on. People in these areas, especially Kyoto women, tend to consider おる /oru/ an outspoken or contempt word. They usually use it for mates, inferiors and animals; avoid using for elders (exception: respectful expression orareru and humble expression orimasu). In other areas such as Hyogo and Mie, いる /iru/ is hardly used and おる /oru/ does not have the negative usage. In parts of Wakayama, いる /iru/ is replaced with ある /aru/, which is used for inanimate objects in most other dialects.

The verb おる /oru/ is also used as a suffix and usually pronounced /-joru/ in that case. In Osaka, Kyoto, Shiga, northern Nara and parts of Mie, mainly in masculine speech, -よる /-joru/ shows annoying or contempt feelings for a third party, usually milder than -やがる /-jaɡaru/. In Hyogo, southern Nara and parts of Wakayama, -よる /-joru/ is used for progressive aspect (See Aspect).

==== Negative ====
In informal speech, the negative verb ending, which is -ない /-nai/ in standard Japanese, is expressed with -ん /-N/ or -へん /-heN/, as in 行かん /ikaN/ and 行かへん /ikaheN/ "not going", which is 行かない /ikanai/ in standard Japanese. -ん /-N/ is a transformation of the classical Japanese negative form -ぬ /-nu/ and is also used for some idioms in standard Japanese. -へん /-heN/ is the result of contraction and phonological change of はせん /-wa seN/, the emphatic form of /-N/. -やへん /-jaheN/, a transitional form between はせん /-wa seN/ and へん /-heN/, is sometimes still used for 一段 ichidan verbs. The godan verbs conjugation before -hen has two varieties: the more common conjugation is /-aheN/ like 行かへん /ikaheN/, but -ehen like 行けへん /ikeheN/ is also used in Osaka. When the vowel before -へん /-heN/ is /-i/, -へん /-heN/ often changes to -ひん /-hiN/, especially in Kyoto. The past negative form is -んかった /-NkaQta/ and /-heNkaQta/, a mixture of -ん /-N/ or -へん /-heN/ and the standard past negative form -なかった /-nakaQta/. In traditional Kansai dialect, -なんだ /-naNda/ and -へなんだ /-henaNda/ is used in the past negative form.

- 五段 godan verbs: 使う /tukau/ ("to use") becomes 使わん /tukawaN/ and 使わへん /tukawaheN/, 使えへん /tukaeheN/
- 上一段 kami-ichidan verbs: 起きる /okiru/ ("to wake up") becomes 起きん /okiN/ and 起きやへん /okijaheN/, 起きへん /okiheN/, 起きひん /okihiN/
  - one mora verbs: 見る /miru/ ("to see") becomes 見ん /miN/ and 見やへん /mijaheN/, 見えへん /meːheN/, 見いひん /miːhiN/
- 下一段 shimo-ichidan verbs: 食べる /taberu/ ("to eat") becomes 食べん /tabeN/ and 食べやへん /tabejaheN/, 食べへん /tabeheN/
  - one mora verbs: 寝る /neru/ ("to sleep") becomes 寝ん /neN/ and 寝やへん /nejaheN/, 寝えへん /neːheN/
- s-irregular verb: する /suru/ becomes せん /seN/ and しやへん /sijaheN/, せえへん /seːheN/, しいひん /siːhiN/
- k-irregular verb: 来る /kuru/ becomes 来ん /koN/ and きやへん /kijaheN/, けえへん /keːheN/, きいひん /kiːhiN/
  - 来おへん /koːheN/, a mixture of けえへん /keːheN/ with standard 来ない /konai/, is also used lately by young people, especially in Kobe.

Generally speaking, -へん /-heN/ is used in almost negative sentences and -ん /-N/ is used in strong negative sentences and idiomatic expressions. For example, -んといて /-N toite/ or -んとって /-N toQte/ instead of standard -ないで /-nai de/ means "please do not do"; -んでもええ /-N demo eː/ instead of standard -なくてもいい /-nakutemo iː/ means "need not do";-んと（あかん） /-N to (akaN)/ instead of standard -なくちゃ（いけない） /-nakutja (ikenai)/ or -なければならない /-nakereba (naranai)/ means "must do". The last expression can be replaced by -な（あかん）/-na (akaN)/ or -んならん /-N naraN/.

==== Imperative ====
Kansai dialect has two imperative forms. One is the normal imperative form, inherited from Late Middle Japanese. The -ろ /-ro/ form for ichidan verbs in standard Japanese is much rarer and replaced by /-i/ or /-e/ in Kansai. The normal imperative form is often followed by よ /jo/ or や /ja/. The other is a soft and somewhat feminine form which uses the adverbial (連用形, ren'yōkei) (ます /-masu/ stem), an abbreviation of adverbial (連用形, ren'yōkei) + /nasai/. The end of the soft imperative form is often elongated and is generally followed by や /ja/ or な /na/. In Kyoto, women often add よし /-josi/ to the soft imperative form.

- godan verbs: 使う /tukau/ becomes 使え /tukae/ in the normal form, 使い（い） /tukai(ː)/ in the soft one.
- 上一段 kami-ichidan verbs: 起きる /okiru/ becomes 起きい /okiː/ (L-H-L) in the normal form, 起き（い） /oki(ː)/ (L-L-H) in the soft one.
- 下一段 shimo-ichidan verbs: 食べる /taberu/ becomes 食べえ /tabeː/ (L-H-L) in the normal form, 食べ（え） /tabe(ː)/ (L-L-H) in the soft one.
- s-irregular verb: する /suru/ becomes せえ /seː/ in the normal form, し（い） /si(ː)/ in the soft one.
- k-irregular verb: 来る /kuru/ becomes こい /koi/ in the normal form, き（い） /ki(ː)/ in the soft one.

In the negative imperative mood, Kansai dialect also has the somewhat soft form which uses the ren'yōkei + な /na/, an abbreviation of the ren'yōkei + なさるな /nasaruna/. な /na/ sometimes changes to なや /naja/ or ないな /naina/. This soft negative imperative form is the same as the soft imperative and な /na/, Kansai speakers can recognize the difference by accent, but Tokyo speakers are sometimes confused by a command not to do something, which they interpret as an order to do it. Accent on the soft imperative form is flat, and the accent on the soft negative imperative form has a downstep before na.

- 五段 godan verbs: 使う /tukau/ becomes 使うな /tukauna/ in the normal form, 使いな /tukaina/ in the soft one.
- 上一段 kami-ichidan verbs: 起きる /okiru/ becomes 起きるな /okiruna/ in the normal form, 起きな /okina/ in the soft one.
- 下一段 shimo-ichidan verbs: 食べる /taberu/ becomes 食べるな /taberuna/ in the normal form, 食べな /tabena/ in the soft one.
- s-irregular verb: する /suru/ becomes するな /suruna/ or すな /suna/ in the normal form, しな /sina/ in the soft one.
- k-irregular verb: 来る /kuru/ becomes 来るな /kuruna/ in the normal form, きな /kina/ in the soft one.

=== Adjectives ===
The stem of adjective forms in Kansai dialect is generally the same as in standard Japanese, except for regional vocabulary differences. The same process that reduced the Classical Japanese terminal and attributive endings (し /-si/ and き /-ki/, respectively) to /-i/ has reduced also the ren'yōkei ending く /-ku/ to /-u/, yielding such forms as 早う /hajoː/ (contraction of 早う /hajau/) for 早く /hajaku/ ("quickly"). Dropping the consonant from the final mora in all forms of adjective endings has been a frequent occurrence in Japanese over the centuries (and is the origin of such forms as ありがとう /ariɡatoː/ and おめでとう /omedetoː/), but the Kantō speech preserved く /-ku/ while reducing し /-si/ and き /-ki/ to /-i/, thus accounting for the discrepancy in the standard language (see also Onbin)

The /-i/ ending can be dropped and the last vowel of the adjective's stem can be stretched out for a second mora, sometimes with a tonal change for emphasis. By this process, omoroi "interesting, funny" becomes omorō and atsui "hot" becomes atsū or attsū. This use of the adjective's stem, often as an exclamation, is seen in classical literature and many dialects of modern Japanese, but is more often used in modern Kansai dialect.

There is not a special conjugated form for presumptive of adjectives in Kansai dialect, it is just addition of やろ /jaro/ to the plain form. For example, 安かろう /jasukaroː/ (the presumptive form of 安い /jasui/ "cheap") is hardly used and is usually replaced with the plain form + やろ /jaro/ likes 安いやろ /jasui jaro/. Polite suffixes です/だす/どす /desu, dasu, dosu/ and ます /-masu/ are also added やろ /jaro/ for presumptive form instead of でしょう /desjoː/ in standard Japanese. For example, 今日は晴れでしょう /kjoː wa hare desjoː/ ("It may be fine weather today") is replaced with 今日は晴れですやろ /kjoː wa hare desu jaro/.

=== Copulae ===
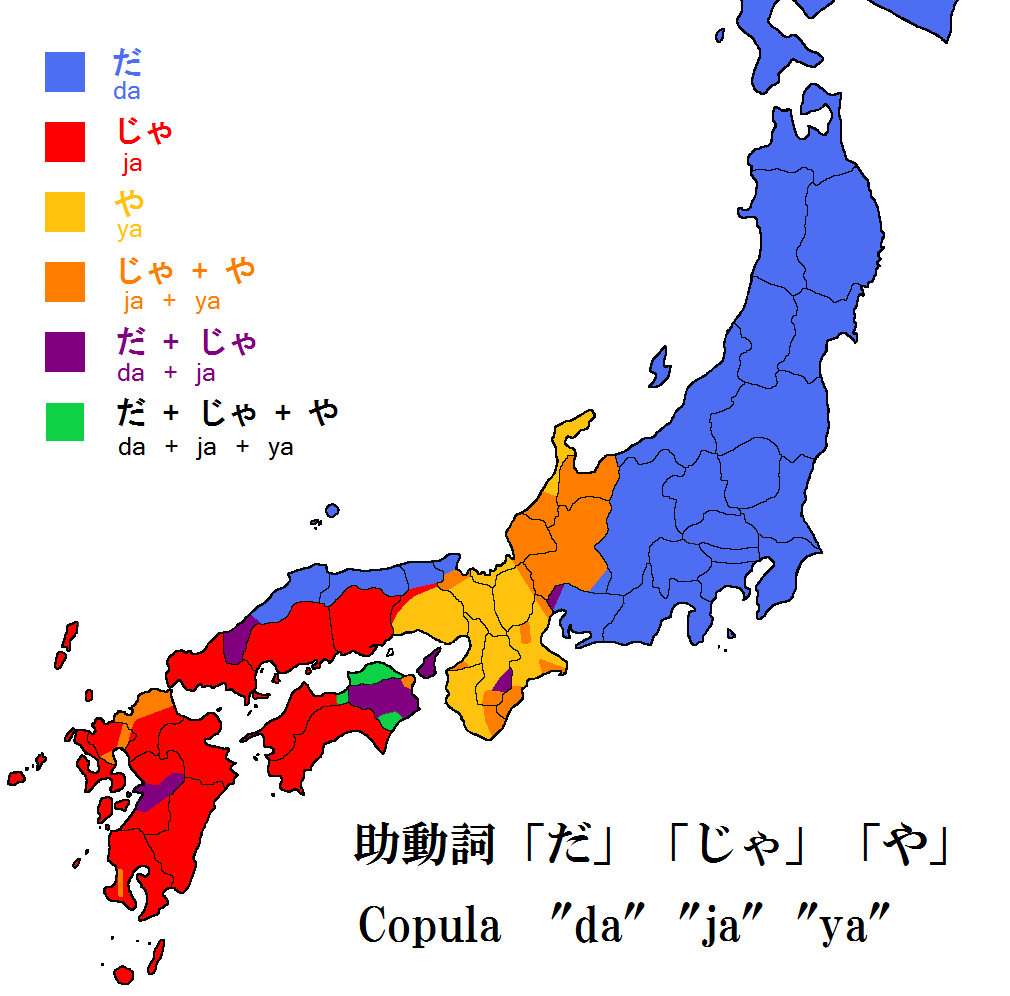
Ya is used mainly in the zone colored in yellow.

The standard Japanese copula da is replaced by the Kansai dialect copula ya. The inflected forms maintain this difference, resulting in yaro for darō (presumptive), yatta for datta (past); darō is often considered to be a masculine expression, but yaro is used by both men and women. The negative copula de wa nai or ja nai is replaced by ya nai or ya arahen/arehen in Kansai dialect. Ya originated from ja (a variation of dearu) in late Edo period and is still commonly used in other parts of western Japan like Hiroshima, and is also used stereotypically by old men in fiction.

Ya and ja are used only informally, analogically to the standard da, while the standard desu is by and large used for the polite (teineigo) copula. For polite speech, -masu, desu and gozaimasu are used in Kansai as well as in Tokyo, but traditional Kansai dialect has its own polite forms. Desu is replaced by dasu in Osaka and dosu in Kyoto. There is another unique polite form omasu and it is often replaced by osu in Kyoto. The usage of omasu/osu is same as gozaimasu, the polite form of the verb aru and also be used for polite form of adjectives, but it is more informal than gozaimasu. In Osaka, dasu and omasu are sometimes shortened to da and oma. Omasu and osu have their negative forms omahen and ohen.

The politeness levels of copula
| | impolite | informal | polite1 | polite2 | polite formal |
|---|---|---|---|---|---|
| Osaka | ja | ya | dasu | de omasu | de gozaimasu |
| Kyoto | ja | ya | dosu | | de gozaimasu |

When some sentence-final particles and a presumptive inflection yaro follow -su ending polite forms, su is often combined especially in Osaka. Today, this feature is usually considered to be dated or exaggerated Kansai dialect.

- -n'na (-su + na), emphasis. e.g. Bochi-bochi den'na. ("So-so, you know.")
- -n'nen (-su + nen), emphasis. e.g. Chaiman'nen. ("It is wrong")
- -ngana (-su + gana), emphasis. e.g. Yoroshū tanomimangana. ("Nice to meet you")
- -kka (-su + ka), question. e.g. Mōkarimakka? ("How's business?")
- -n'no (-su + no), question. e.g. Nani yūteman'no? ("What are you talking about?")
- -sse (-su + e, a variety of yo), explain, advise. e.g. Ee toko oshiemasse! ("I'll show you a nice place!")
- -ssharo (-su + yaro), surmise, make sure. e.g. Kyō wa hare dessharo. ("It may be fine weather today")

=== Aspect ===
In common Kansai dialect, there are two forms for the continuous and progressive aspects -teru and -toru; the former is a shortened form of -te iru just as does standard Japanese, the latter is a shortened form of -te oru which is common to other western Japanese. The proper use between -teru and -toru is same as iru and oru.

In the expression to the condition of inanimate objects, -taru or -taaru form, a shortened form of -te aru. In standard Japanese, -te aru is only used with transitive verbs, but in Kansai -taru or -taaru is also used with intransitive verbs. Similarly, -te yaru, "to do for someone", can be contracted to -taru (or to -charu in Senshu and Wakayama).

Other Western Japanese as Chūgoku and Shikoku dialects has the discrimination of grammatical aspect, -yoru in progressive and -toru in perfect. In Kansai, some dialects of southern Hyogo and Kii Peninsula have these discrimination, too. In parts of Wakayama, -yoru and -toru are replaced with -yaru and -taaru/chaaru.

=== Politeness ===
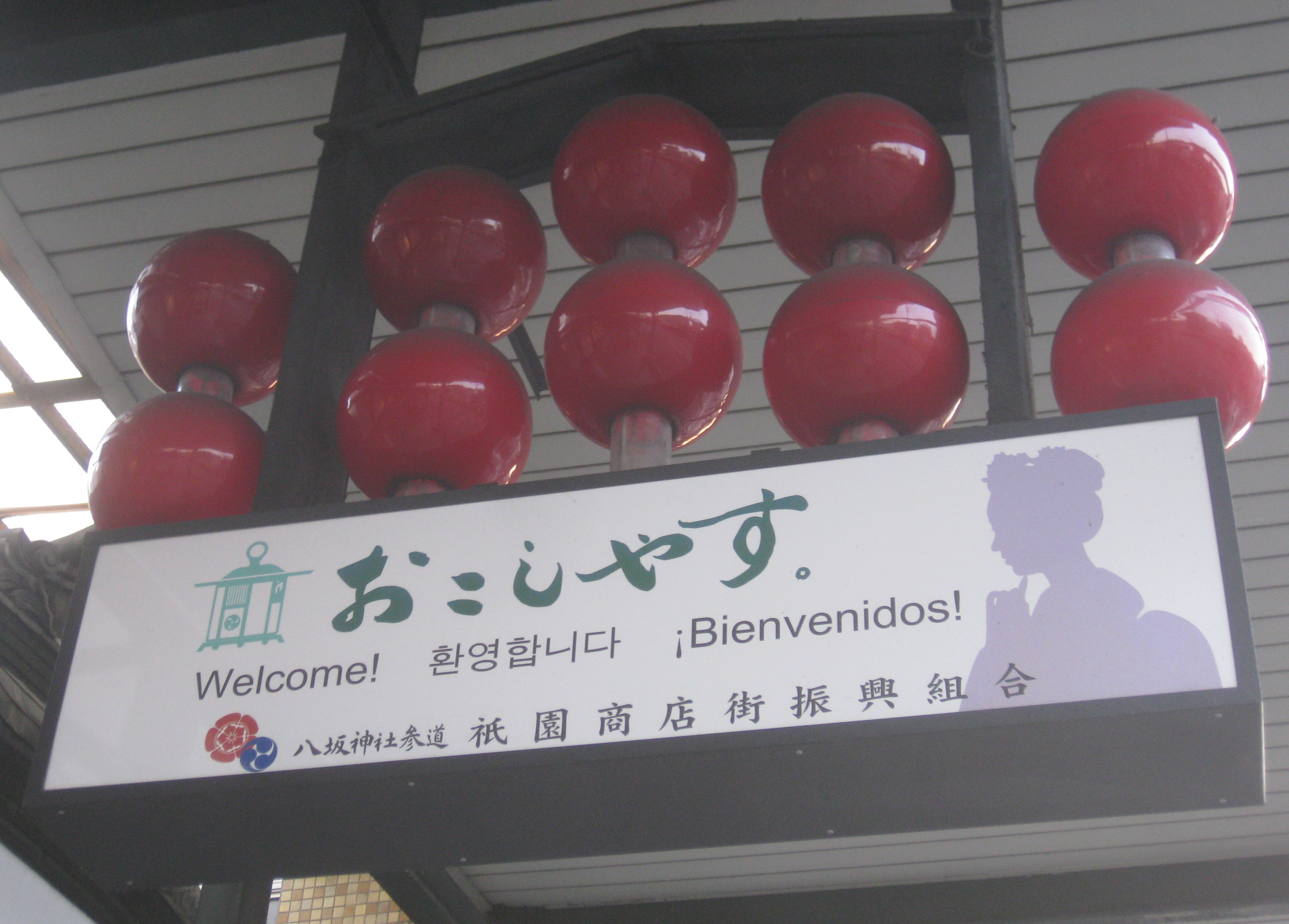
Okoshi yasu "Welcome" on a billboard for visitors in Gion, Kyōto

Historically, extensive use of keigo (honorific speech) was a feature of the Kansai dialect, especially in Kyōto, while the Kantō dialect, from which standard Japanese developed, formerly lacked it. Keigo in standard Japanese was originally borrowed from the medieval Kansai dialect. However, keigo is no longer considered a feature of the dialect since Standard Japanese now also has it. Even today, keigo is used more often in Kansai than in the other dialects except for the standard Japanese, to which people switch in formal situations.

In modern Kansai dialect, -haru (sometimes -yaharu except godan verbs, mainly Kyōto) is used for showing reasonable respect without formality especially in Kyōto. The conjugation before -haru has two varieties between Kyōto and Ōsaka (see the table below). In Southern Hyōgo, including Kōbe, -te ya is used instead of -haru. In formal speech, -naharu and -haru connect with -masu and -te ya changes -te desu.

-Haru was originally a shortened form of -naharu, a transformation of -nasaru. -Naharu has been dying out due to the spread of -haru but its imperative form -nahare (mainly Ōsaka) or -nahai (mainly Kyōto, also -nai) and negative imperative form -nasan'na or -nahan'na has comparatively survived because -haru lacks an imperative form. In more honorific speech, o- yasu, a transformation of o- asobasu, is used especially in Kyōto and its original form is same to its imperative form, showing polite invitation or order. Oide yasu and okoshi yasu (more respectful), meaning "welcome", are the common phrases of sightseeing areas in Kyōto. -Te okun nahare (also -tokun nahare, -toku nahare) and -te okure yasu (also -tokure yasu, -tokuryasu) are used instead of -te kudasai in standard Japanese.

The honorific form of Kansai dialect
| | use | see | exist | eat | do | come | -te form |
|---|---|---|---|---|---|---|---|
| original | tsukau | miru | iru, oru | taberu | suru | kuru | -teru |
| o- yasu | otsukaiyasu | omiyasu | oiyasu | otabeyasu | oshiyasu | okoshiyasu, oideyasu | -toiyasu |
| -naharu | tsukainaharu | minaharu | inaharu | tabenaharu | shinaharu | kinaharu | -tenaharu |
| -haru in Kyōto | tsukawaharu | miharu | iharu iteharu (mainly Ōsaka) | tabeharu | shiharu | kiharu | -taharu |
| -haru in Ōsaka | tsukaiharu | miharu | iharu iteharu (mainly Ōsaka) | tabeharu | shiharu | kiharu | -teharu |
| -yaharu | | miyaharu | iyaharu yaharu | tabeyaharu | shiyaharu shaharu | kiyaharu kyaharu | -teyaharu |
| -te ya | tsukōte ya | mite ya | otte ya | tabete ya | shite ya | kite ya | -totte ya |

=== Particles ===
There is some difference in the particles between Kansai dialect and standard Japanese. In colloquial Kansai dialect, case markers (格助詞, kaku-joshi) are often left out especially the accusative case o and the quotation particles to and te (equivalent to tte in standard). The ellipsis of to and te happens only before two verbs: yū (to say) and omou (to think). For example, Tanaka-san to yū hito ("a man called Mr. Tanaka") can change to Tanaka-san yū hito. And to yū is sometimes contracted to chū or tchū instead of te, tsū or ttsū in Tokyo. For example, nanto yū koto da! or nante kotta! ("My goodness!") becomes nanchū kotcha! in Kansai.

The interjectory particle (間投助詞, kantō-joshi) na or naa is used very often in Kansai dialect instead of ne or nee in standard Japanese. In standard Japanese, naa is considered rough masculine style in some context, but in Kansai dialect naa is used by both men and women in many familiar situations. It is not only used as an interjectory particle (as emphasis for the imperative form, expression and admiration, and address to listeners, for example), and the meaning varies depending on context and voice intonation, so much so that naa has been called the world's third most difficult word to translate. Besides naa and nee, noo is also used in some areas, but noo is usually considered too harsh a masculine particle in modern Keihanshin.

Kara and node, the conjunctive particles (接続助詞, setsuzoku-joshi) meaning "because," are replaced by sakai or yotte; ni is sometimes added to the end of both, and sakai changes to sake in some areas. Sakai was so famous as the characteristic particle of Kansai dialect that a special saying was made out of it: "Sakai in Osaka and Berabō in Edo" (大阪さかいに江戸べらぼう, Ōsaka sakai ni Edo berabō)". However, in recent years, the standard kara and node have become dominant.

Kate or katte is also characteristic particle of Kansai dialect, transformation of ka tote. Kate has two usages. When kate is used with conjugative words, mainly in the past form and the negative form, it is the equivalent of the English "even if" or "even though", such as Kaze hiita kate, watashi wa ryokō e iku ("Even if [I] catch a cold, I will go on the trip"). When kate is used with nouns, it means something like "even", "too," or "either", such as Ore kate shiran ("I don't know, either"), and is similar to the particle mo and datte.

==== Sentence final particles ====
The sentence-final particles (終助詞, shū-joshi) used in Kansai differ widely from those used in Tokyo. The most prominent to Tokyo speakers is the heavy use of wa by men. In standard Japanese, it is used exclusively by women and so is said to sound softer. In western Japanese including Kansai dialect, however, it is used equally by both men and women in many different levels of conversation. It is noted that the feminine usage of wa in Tokyo is pronounced with a rising intonation and the Kansai usage of wa is pronounced with a falling intonation.

Another difference in sentence final particles that strikes the ear of the Tokyo speaker is the nen particle such as nande ya nen!, "you gotta be kidding!" or "why/what the hell?!", a stereotype tsukkomi phrase in the manzai. It comes from no ya (particle no + copula ya, also n ya) and much the same as the standard Japanese no da (also n da). Nen has some variation, such as neya (intermediate form between no ya and nen), ne (shortened form), and nya (softer form of neya). When a copula precedes these particles, da + no da changes to na no da (na n da) and ya + no ya changes to na no ya (na n ya), but ya + nen does not change to na nen. No da is never used with polite form, but no ya and nen can be used with formal form such as nande desu nen, a formal form of nande ya nen. In past tense, nen changes to -ten; for example, "I love you" would be suki ya nen or sukkya nen, and "I loved you" would be suki yatten.

In the interrogative sentence, the use of nen and no ya is restricted to emphatic questions and involves interrogative words. For simple questions, (no) ka is usually used and ka is often omitted as well as standard Japanese, but no is often changed n or non (somewhat feminine) in Kansai dialect. In standard Japanese, kai is generally used as a masculine variation of ka, but in Kansai dialect, kai is used as an emotional question and is mainly used for rhetorical question rather than simple question and is often used in the forms as kaina (softer) and kaiya (harsher). When kai follows the negative verb ending -n, it means strong imperative sentence. In some areas such as Kawachi and Banshu, ke is used instead of ka, but it is considered a harsh masculine particle in common Kansai dialect.

The emphatic particle ze, heard often from Tokyo men, is rarely heard in Kansai. Instead, the particle de is used, arising from the replacement of z with d in words. However, despite the similarity with ze, the Kansai de does not carry nearly as heavy or rude a connotation, as it is influenced by the lesser stress on formality and distance in Kansai. In Kyoto, especially feminine speech, de is sometimes replaced with e. The particle zo is also replaced to do by some Kansai speakers, but do carries a rude masculine impression unlike de.

The emphasis or tag question particle jan ka in the casual speech of Kanto changes to yan ka in Kansai. Yan ka has some variations, such as a masculine variation yan ke (in some areas, but yan ke is also used by women) and a shortened variation yan, just like jan in Kanto. Jan ka and jan are used only in informal speech, but yan ka and yan can be used with formal forms like sugoi desu yan! ("It is great!"). Youngsters often use yan naa, the combination of yan and naa for tag question.

== Vocabulary ==
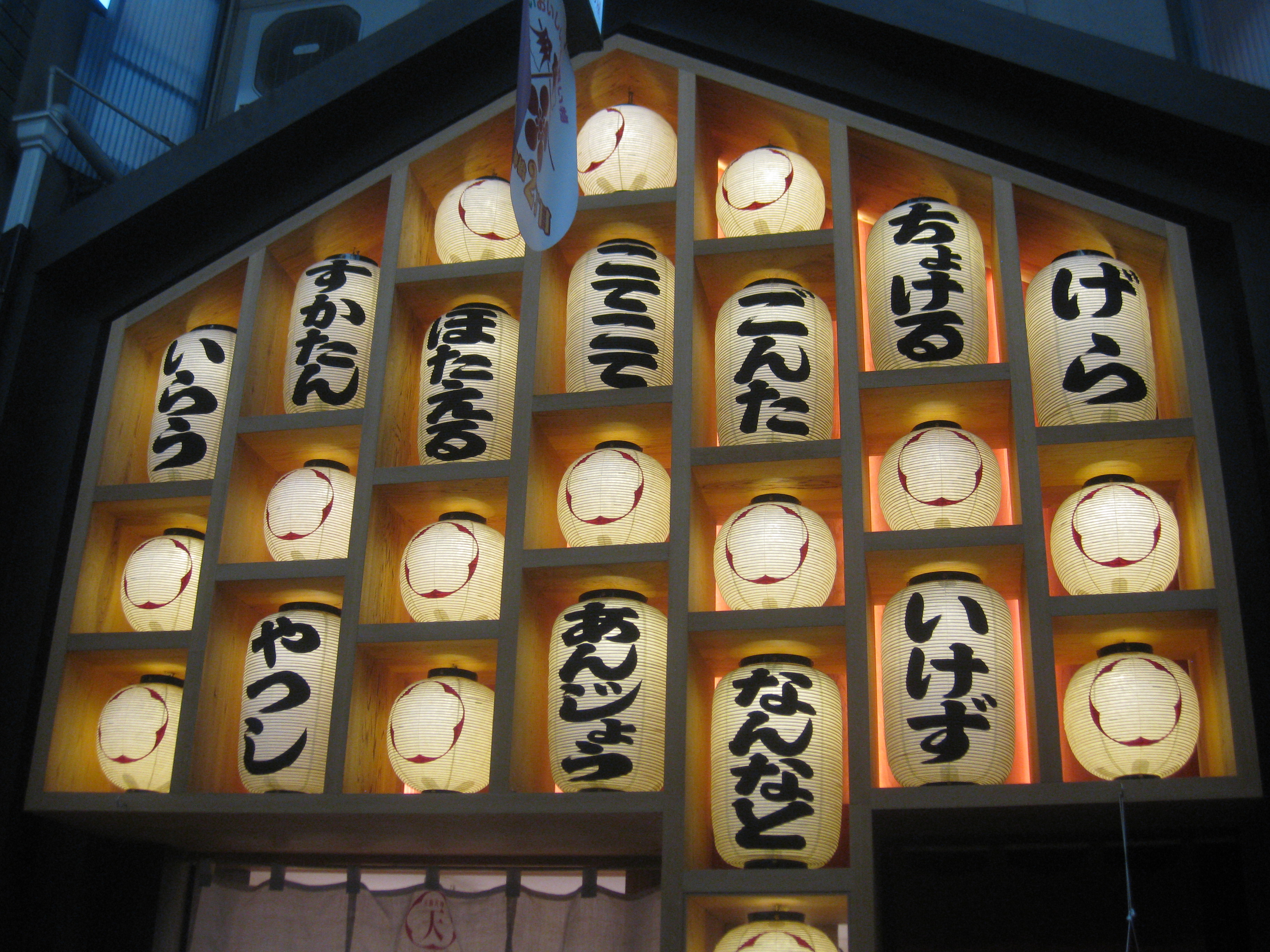
A signboard utilizing Osakan words; from top left: irau "to touch", sukatan "foolish", hotaeru "to be noisy", kotekote "thickly", gonta "mischievous person", chokeru "to be silly", gera "merry drinker", yatsushi "smart dresser", anjō "well", nannato "whatever" and ikezu "spiteful"

In some cases, Kansai dialect uses entirely different words. The verb hokasu corresponds to standard Japanese suteru "to throw away", and metcha corresponds to the standard Japanese slang chō "very". Chō, in Kansai dialect, means "a little" and is a contracted form of chotto. Thus the phrase chō matte "wait a minute" by a Kansai person sounds strange to a Tokyo person.

Some Japanese words gain entirely different meanings or are used in different ways when used in Kansai dialect. One such usage is of the word naosu (usually used to mean "correct" or "repair" in the standard language) in the sense of "put away" or "put back." For example, kono jitensha naoshite means "please put back this bicycle" in Kansai, but many standard speakers are bewildered since in standard Japanese it would mean "please repair this bicycle".

Another widely recognized Kansai-specific usage is of aho. Basically equivalent to the standard baka "idiot, fool", aho is both a term of reproach and a term of endearment to the Kansai speaker, somewhat like English twit or silly. Baka, which is used as "idiot" in most regions, becomes "complete moron" and a stronger insult than aho. Where a Tokyo citizen would almost certainly object to being called baka, being called aho by a Kansai person is not necessarily much of an insult. Being called baka by a Kansai speaker is however a much more severe criticism than it would be by a Tokyo speaker. Most Kansai speakers cannot stand being called baka but don't mind being called aho.

=== Well-known words ===
Here are some words and phrases famous as part of the Kansai dialect:

| Kansai dialect | accent | Standard Japanese | English | Note | Example |
|---|---|---|---|---|---|
| akan or akahen | H-H-H, H-L-L-L | dame, ikemasen, shimatta | wrong, no good, must, oh no! | abbreviation of "rachi ga akanu"; akimasen or akimahen (H-H-H-H-H) for polite speech; -ta(ra) akan means "must not ..."; -na akan and -nto akan means "must ...". | Tabetara akan. = "You must not eat." : Tabena/Tabento akan = "You must eat." |
| aho, ahō | L-HL, L-H-L | baka | silly, idiot, fool | sometimes used friendly with a joke; this accompanies a stereotype that baka is considered a much more serious insult in Kansai; Ahondara (L-L-L-H-L) is strong abusive form; Ahokusai (L-L-H-L-L) and Ahorashii(L-L-H-L-L) are adjective form; originally ahau and said to derive from a Chinese word 阿呆; ā dāi in Muromachi period. | Honma aho ya naa. = "You are really silly." |
| beppin | H-H-H | bijin | beautiful woman | Originally written 別品, meaning a product of exceptional quality; extrapolated to apply to women of exceptional beauty, rewritten as 別嬪. Often appended with -san. | Beppin-san ya na. = "You are a pretty woman." |
| charinko, chari | | jitensha | bicycle | said to derive either from onomatopoeia of the bell, or corrupted from jajeongeo, a Korean word for "bicycle" used by Osaka-born Koreans. Has spread out to most of Japan in recent decades. | Eki made aruite ikun? Uun, chari de iku wa. ("Are you walking to the station?" "No, I'm going by bike.") |
| chau | H-H | chigau, de wa nai, janai | that isn't it, that isn't good, nope, wrong | reduplication chau chau is often used for informal negative phrase | Are, chauchau chau? Chau chau, chauchau chau n chau? = "It is a Chow Chow, isn't it?" "No, it isn't a Chow Chow, is it?" (a famous pun with Kansai dialect) |
| dabo | L-HL | baka | silly, idiot, fool | used in Kobe and Banshu; harsher than aho | |
| donai | H-H-H | donna, dō | how (demonstrative) | konai means konna (such, like this); sonai means sonna (such, like it); anai means anna (such, like that) | Donai yatta? = "How was it?" |
| do | | | excessively (prefix) | often used with bad meanings; also used in several dialects and recently standard Japanese | do-aho = "terribly fool" do-kechi = "terribly miser" |
| dotsuku | H-H-H | naguru | to clobber somebody | do + tsuku (突く; prick, push); also dozuku | Anta, dotsuku de! = "Hey, I'll clobber you!" |
| donkusai | L-L-H-L-L | manuke, nibui | stupid, clumsy, inefficient, lazy | literally "slow-smelling" (鈍臭い) | |
| ee | L-H | yoi, ii | good, proper, all right | used only in Plain form; other conjugations are same as yoi (Perfective form yokatta generally does not change ekatta); also used in other western Japan and Tohoku | Kakko ee de. = "You look cool." |
| egetsunai | H-H-H-L-L | akudoi, iyarashii, rokotsu-na | indecent, vicious, obnoxious | | Egetsunai yarikata = "Indecent way" |
| erai | H-L-L | erai, taihen | great, high-status, terrible, terribly | the usage as meaning "terrible" and "terribly" is more often in Kansai than in Tokyo; also sometimes used as meaning "tired" as shindoi in Chubu and western Japan | Erai kotcha! (< erai koto ja) = "It is a terrible/difficult thing/matter!" |
| gotsui | H-L-L | ikatsui, sugoi | rough, huge | a variation of the adjective form gottsu is used as "very" or "terribly" like metcha | Gottsu ee kanji = "feelin' real good" |
| gyōsan | H-L-L-L or L-L-H-L | takusan | a lot of, many | also yōsan, may be a mixture of gyōsan and yōke; also used in other western Japan; 仰山 in kanji | Gyōsan tabe ya. = "Eat heartily." |
| hannari | H-L-L-L or L-L-H-L | hanayaka, jōhin | elegant, splendid, graceful | mainly used in Kyoto | Hannari-shita kimono = "Elegant kimono" |
| hiku | H-H | shiku | to spread on a flat surface (e.g. bedding, butter) | A result of the palatalization of "s" occurring elsewhere in the dialect. | Futon hiitoite ya. = "Lay out the futons, will you?" |
| hokasu | H-H-H | suteru | to throw away, to dump | also horu (H-H). Note particularly that the phrase "gomi (o) hottoite" means "throw out the garbage" in Kansai dialect, but "let the garbage be" in standard Japanese. | Sore hokashitoite. = "Dump it." |
| honde | H-H-H | sorede | and so, so that (conjunction) | | Honde na, kinō na, watashi na... = "And, in yesterday, I..." |
| honnara, hona | H-H-L-L, H-L | (sore)dewa, (sore)ja, (sore)nara | then, in that case, if that's true (conjunction) | often used for informal good-by. | Hona mata. = "Well then." |
| honma | L-L-H, H-H-H | hontō | true, real | honma-mon, equivalent to Standard honmono, means "genuine thing"; also used in other western Japan; 本真 in kanji | Sore honma? = "Is that true?" |
| ikezu | L-H-L | ijiwaru | spiteful, ill-natured | | Ikezu sentoitee na. = "Don't be spiteful to me." |
| itemau, itekomasu | H-H-H-H, H-H-H-H-H | yattsukeru, yatchimau | to beat, to finish off | | Itemau do, ware! = "I'll finish you off!" (typical fighting words) |
| kamahen or kamehen | H-L-L-L | kamawanai | never mind; it doesn't matter | abbreviation of "kamawahen" | Kamahen, kamahen. = "It doesn't matter: it's OK." |
| kanawan | H-H-L-L | iya da, tamaranai | can't stand it; unpleasant; unwelcome | also kanan (H-L-L) | Kō atsui to kanawan naa. = "I can't stand this hot weather." |
| kashiwa | L-H-L | toriniku | chicken (food) | compared the colour of plumage of chickens to the colour of leaves of the kashiwa; also used in other western Japan and Nagoya | Kashiwa hito-kire chōdai. = "Give me a cut of chicken." |
| kattaa shatsu, kattā | H-H-H L-L, H-L-L | wai shatsu ("Y-shirt") | dress shirt | wasei-eigo. originally a brand of Mizuno, a sportswear company in Osaka. kattaa is a pun of "cutter" and "katta" (won, beat, overcame). | |
| kettai-na | H-L-L-L | kimyō-na, hen-na, okashi-na, fushigi-na | strange | | Kettai-na fuku ya na. = "They are strange clothes." |
| kettakuso warui | H-H-H-H H-L-L | imaimashii, haradatashii | damned, stupid, irritating | kettai + kuso "shit" + warui "bad" | |
| kii warui | H-H H-L-L | kanji ga warui, iyana kanji | be not in a good feeling | kii is a lengthened vowel form of ki (気). | |
| kosobai or koshobai | H-H-L-L | kusuguttai | ticklish | shortened form of kosobayui; also used in other western Japan | |
| maido | L-H-L | dōmo | commercial greeting | the original meaning is "Thank you always". 毎度 in kanji. | Maido, irasshai! = "Hi, may I help you?" |
| makudo | L-H-L | makku | McDonald's | abbreviation of makudonarudo (Japanese pronunciation of "McDonald's") | Makudo iko. = "Let's go to McDonald's." |
| mebachiko | L-H-L-L | monomorai | stye | meibo (H-L-L) in Kyoto and Shiga. | |
| metcha or messa or mutcha | L-H | totemo, chō | very | mostly used by younger people. also bari (L-H) in southern Hyogo, adopted from Chugoku dialect. | Metcha omoroi mise shitteru de. = "I know a really interesting shop." |
| nanbo | L-L-H | ikura, ikutsu | how much, no matter how, how old, how many | transformation of nanihodo (何程); also used in other western Japan, Tohoku and Hokkaido. | Sore nanbo de kōta n? = "How much did you pay for it?" |
| nukui | H-L-L | atatakai, attakai | warm | also used in other western Japan | |
| ochokuru | H-H-H-H | karakau, chakasu | to make fun of, to tease | | Ore ochokuru no mo eekagen ni see! = "That's enough to tease me!" |
| okan, oton | L-H-L, L-H-L | okaasan, otōsan | mother, father | very casual form | |
| ōkini | H-L-H-L or L-L-H-L | arigatō | thanks | abbreviation of "ōki ni arigatō" (thank you very much, ōki ni means "very much"); of course, arigatō is also used; sometimes, it is used ironically to mean "No thank you"; also ōkeni | Maido ōkini! = "Thanks always!" |
| otchan | H-H-H | ojisan | uncle, older man | a familiar term of address for a middle-aged man; also used as a first personal pronoun; the antonym "aunt, older woman" is obachan (also used in standard Japanese); also ossan and obahan, but ruder than otchan and obachan | Otchan, takoyaki futatsu! Aiyo! = (conversation with a takoyaki stall man) "Two takoyaki please, mister!" "All right!" |
| shaanai | H-H-L-L | shōganai, shikata ga nai | it can't be helped | also used some other dialects | |
| shibaku | H-H-H | naguru, tataku | to beat somebody (with hands or rods) | sometimes used as a vulgar word meaning "to go" or "to eat" such as Chaa shibakehen? "Why don't you go to cafe?" | Shibaitaro ka! ( < shibaite yarō ka) = "Do you want me to give you a beating?" |
| shindoi | L-L-H-L | tsukareru, tsurai, kurushii | tired, exhausted | change from shinrō (辛労; hardship); shindoi has come to be used throughout Japan in recent years. | Aa shindo. = "Ah, I'm tired." |
| shōmonai | L-L-H-L-L | tsumaranai, omoshirokunai, kudaranai | dull, unimportant, uninteresting | change from shiyō mo nai (仕様も無い, means "There isn't anything"); also used some other dialects | |
| sunmasen or sunmahen | L-L-L-L-H | sumimasen, gomen nasai | I'm sorry, excuse me, thanks | suman (H-L-L) in casual speech; also kan'nin (堪忍, L-L-H-L) for informal apology instead of standard kanben (勘弁) | Erai sunmahen. = "I'm so sorry." |
| taku | H-H | niru | to boil, to simmer | in standard Japanese, taku is used only for cooking rice; also used in other western Japan | Daikon yō taketa. = "The daikon was boiled well." |
| waya | H-L | mucha-kucha, dainashi, dame | going for nothing, fruitless | also used in other western Japan, Nagoya and Hokkaido | Sappari waya ya wa. = "It's no good at all." |
| yaru | H-H | yaru, ageru | to give (informal) | used more widely than in standard Japanese towards equals as well as inferiors; when used as helper auxiliaries, -te yaru usually shortened -taru | |
| yome | H-H | tsuma, okusan, kamisan, kanai | wife | originally means "bride" and "daughter-in-law" in standard, but an additional meaning "wife" is spread from Kansai; often used as yome-san or yome-han | anta toko no yome-han = "your wife" |
| yōke | H-L-L | takusan | a lot of, many | change from yokei (余計, means "extra, too many"); a synonymous with gyōsan | |

=== Pronouns and honorifics ===
Standard first-person pronouns such as watashi, boku and ore are also generally used in Kansai, but there are some local pronoun words. Watashi has many variations: watai, wate (both gender), ate (somewhat feminine), and wai (masculine, casual). These variations are now archaic, but are still widely used in fictitious creations to represent stereotypical Kansai speakers especially wate and wai. Elderly Kansai men frequently use washi as well as other western Japan. Uchi is famous for the typical feminine first-person pronoun of Kansai dialect and it is still popular among Kansai girls.

In Kansai, omae and anta are often used for the informal second-person pronoun. Anata is hardly used. Traditional local second-person pronouns include omahan (omae + -han), anta-han and ansan (both are anta + -san, but anta-han is more polite). An archaic first-person pronoun, ware, is used as a hostile and impolite second-person pronoun in Kansai. Jibun (自分) is a Japanese word meaning "oneself" and sometimes "I", but it has an additional usage in Kansai as a casual second-person pronoun.

In traditional Kansai dialect, the honorific suffix -san is sometimes pronounced -han when -san follows a, e and o; for example, okaasan ("mother") becomes okaahan, and Satō-san ("Mr. Satō") becomes Satō-han. It is also the characteristic of Kansai usage of honorific suffixes that they can be used for some familiar inanimate objects as well, especially in Kyoto. In standard Japanese, the usage is usually considered childish, but in Kansai, o-imo-san, o-mame-san and ame-chan are often heard not only in children's speech but also in adults' speech. The suffix -san is also added to some familiar greeting phrases; for example, ohayō-san ("good morning") and omedetō-san ("congratulations").

== Regional differences ==
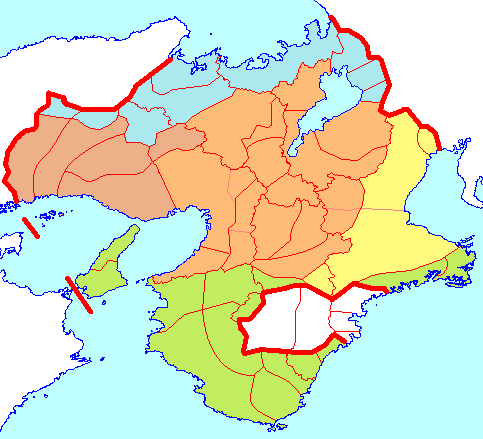
Mitsuo Okumura's division theory in 1960s

Since Kansai dialect is actually a group of related dialects, not all share the same vocabulary, pronunciation, or grammatical features. Each dialect has its own specific features discussed individually here.

- A division theory of Kansai dialects proposed by Minoru Umegaki in 1962
  - South
    - Outer - southern Yamato Province
    - Inner - Shima Province, southern Ise Province, Kii Province
  - Central
    - East (areas under the influence of Kyoto dialect) - Wakasa Province including Tsuruga, Ōmi Province, northern Ise Province, Iga Province, Yamashiro Province, Kuchi-Tanba (southeastern Tanba Province)
    - West (areas under the influence of Osaka dialect) - northern Yamato Province, Settsu Province, Kawachi Province, Izumi Province, Harima Province, Awaji Province
  - North
    - Inner - Oku-Tanba (northwestern Tanba Province), Kuchi-Tango (eastern Tango Province)
    - Outer - Oku-Tango (western Tango Province), Tajima Province
- A division theory of Kansai dialects proposed by Mitsuo Okumura in 1968
  - Central, what is called Kansai-ben - Yamashiro Province, Settsu Province, Kawachi Province, Izumi Province, northern Yamato Province, southern Tanba Province, most of Ōmi Province, Iga Province
  - Outer
    - East - most of Ise Province, part of eastern Ōmi Province
    - West - Harima Province, western Tanba Province
    - South - southern Ise Province, Shima Province, Kii Province, Awaji Province
    - North - northeastern Ōmi Province, northern Tanba Province, southern Tango Province

=== Osaka ===
Osaka-ben (大阪弁) is often identified with Kansai dialect by most Japanese, but some of the terms considered to be characteristic of Kansai dialect are actually restricted to Osaka and its environs. Perhaps the most famous is the term mōkarimakka?, roughly translated as "how is business?", and derived from the verb mōkaru (儲かる), "to be profitable, to yield a profit". This is supposedly said as a greeting from one Osakan to another, and the appropriate answer is another Osaka phrase, maa, bochi bochi denna "well, so-so, y'know".

The idea behind mōkarimakka is that Osaka was historically the center of the merchant culture. The phrase developed among low-class shopkeepers and can be used today to greet a business proprietor in a friendly and familiar way but is not a universal greeting. The latter phrase is also specific to Osaka, in particular the term bochi bochi (L-L-H-L). This means essentially "so-so": getting better little by little or not getting any worse. Unlike mōkarimakka, bochi bochi is used in many situations to indicate gradual improvement or lack of negative change. Also, bochi bochi (H-L-L-L) can be used in place of the standard Japanese soro soro, for instance bochi bochi iko ka "it is about time to be going".

In the Edo period, Senba-kotoba (船場言葉), a social dialect of the wealthy merchants in the central business district of Osaka, was considered the standard Osaka-ben. It was characterized by the polite speech based on Kyoto-ben and the subtle differences depending on the business type, class, post etc. It was handed down in Meiji, Taishō and Shōwa periods with some changes, but after the Pacific War, Senba-kotoba became nearly an obsolete dialect due to the modernization of business practices. Senba-kotoba was famous for a polite copula gowasu or goasu instead of common Osakan copula omasu and characteristic forms for shopkeeper family mentioned below.

An example of forms of address for shopkeeper family in Senba

oesan, oehan (keeper's mother) | oyadansan (keeper's father)
goryonsan (keeper's wife) inkyo no oehan (after retiring) okohittsan (widow) | dansan, danahan (shopkeeper) goinkyohan (after retiring)
itosan, itohan, tōhan (keeper's daughter) | bonsan, bonbon (keeper's son) wakadansan (keeper's heir) | wakagoryonsan (son's wife)
aneitosan (eldest daughter) | nakaitosan (2nd daughter) | koitosan, koisan (3rd daughter) | koikoisan (youngest daughter) | anibonsan (eldest son) | nakabonsan (2nd son) | kobonsan (youngest son)

Southern branches of Osaka-ben, such as Senshū-ben (泉州弁) and Kawachi-ben (河内弁), are famous for their harsh locution, characterized by trilled "r", the question particle ke, and the second person ware. The farther south in Osaka one goes, the cruder the language is considered to be, with the local Senshū-ben of Kishiwada said to represent the peak of harshness.

=== Kyoto ===
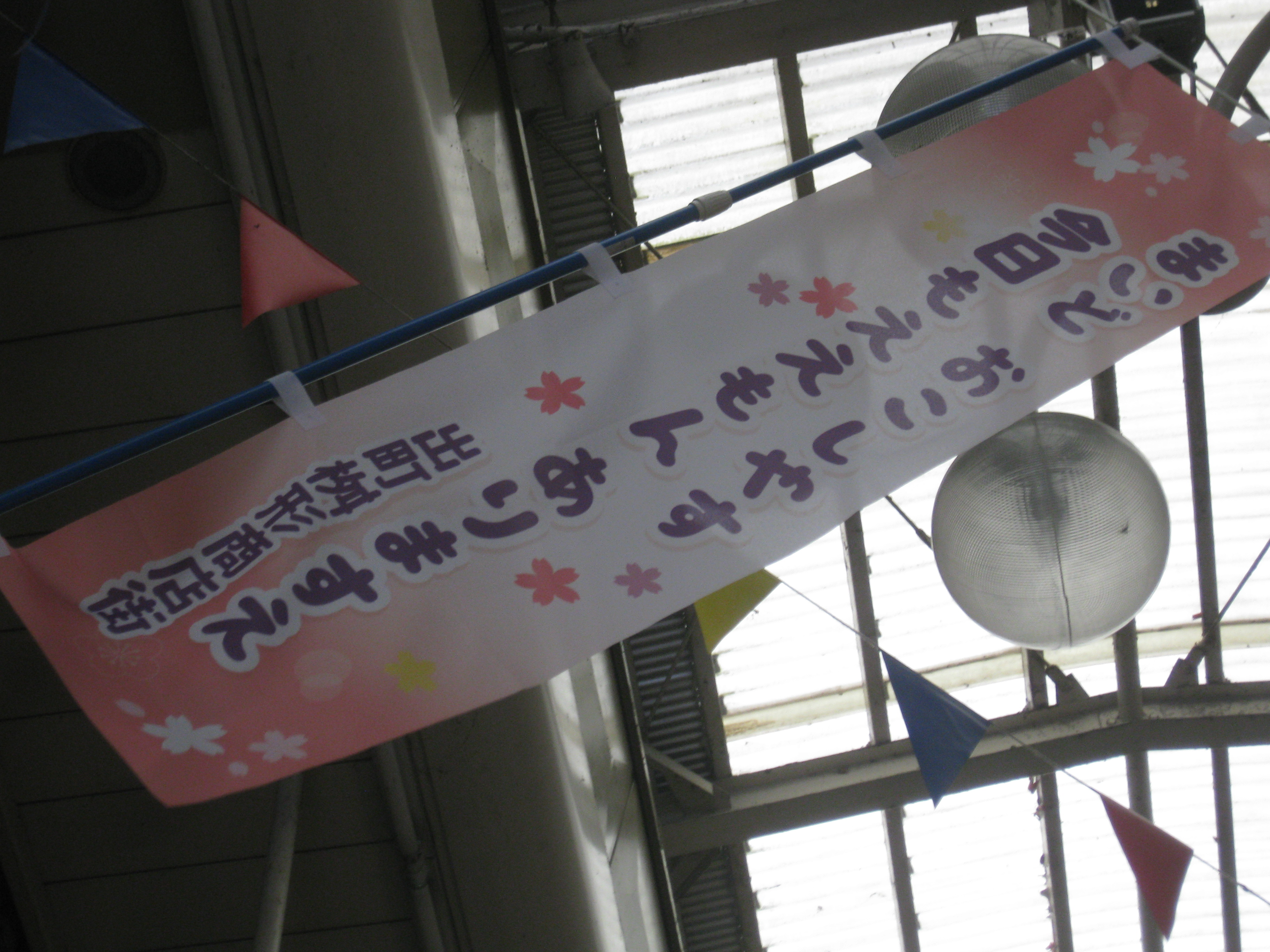
A banner in Kyoto dialect. The advertisement of shopping street, Maido okoshiyasu. Kyō mo ē mon arimasu e translates as "Welcome. We have nice goods every day"

Kyōto-ben (京都弁) or Kyō-kotoba (京言葉) is characterized by development of politeness and indirectness expressions. Kyoto-ben is often regarded as elegant and feminine dialect because of its characters and the image of Gion's geisha (geiko-han and maiko-han in Kyoto-ben), the most conspicuous speakers of traditional Kyoto-ben. Kyoto-ben is divided into the court dialect called Gosho kotoba (御所言葉) and the citizens dialect called Machikata kotoba (町方言葉). The former was spoken by court noble before moving the Emperor to Tokyo, and some phrases inherit at a few monzeki. The latter has subtle difference at each social class such as old merchant families at Nakagyo, craftsmen at Nishijin and geiko at Hanamachi (Gion, Miyagawa-chō etc.)

Kyoto-ben was the de facto standard Japanese from 794 until the 18th century and some Kyoto people are still proud of their accent; they get angry when Tokyo people treat Kyoto-ben as a provincial accent. However, traditional Kyoto-ben is gradually declining except in the world of geisha, which prizes the inheritance of traditional Kyoto customs. For example, a famous Kyoto copula dosu, instead of standard desu, is used by a few elders and geisha now.

The verb inflection -haru is an essential part of casual speech in modern Kyoto. In Osaka and its environs, -haru has a certain level of politeness above the base (informal) form of the verb, putting it somewhere between the informal and the more polite -masu conjugations. However, in Kyoto, its position is much closer to the informal than it is to the polite mood, owing to its widespread use. Kyoto people, especially elderly women, often use -haru for their family and even for animals and weather.

Tango-ben (丹後弁) spoken in northernmost Kyoto Prefecture, is too different to be regarded as Kansai dialect and usually included in Chūgoku dialect. For example, the copula da, the Tokyo-type accent, the honorific verb ending -naru instead of -haru and the peculiarly diphthong [æː] such as [akæː] for akai "red".

=== Hyogo ===
Hyōgo Prefecture is the largest prefecture in Kansai, and there are some different dialects in the prefecture. As mentioned above, Tajima-ben (但馬弁) spoken in northern Hyōgo, former Tajima Province, is included in the Chūgoku dialect group alongside Tango-ben of northern Kyōto. The ancient vowel sequence /au/ changed to [oː] in many Japanese dialects, but in the Tajima, Tottori and Izumo dialects, /au/ changed into [aː]. Accordingly, the Kansai word ahō "idiot" is pronounced ahaa in Tajima-ben.

The dialect spoken in southwestern Hyōgo, former Harima Province alias Banshū, is called Banshū-ben. As well as Chūgoku dialect, it has the discrimination of aspect, -yoru in progressive and -toru in perfect. Banshū-ben is notable for transformation of -yoru and -toru into -yō and -tō, sometimes -yon and -ton. Another feature is the honorific copula -te ya, common in Tanba, Maizuru and San'yō dialects. In addition, Banshū-ben is famous for an emphatic final particle doi or doiya and a question particle ke or ko, but they often sound violent to other Kansai speakers, as well as Kawachi-ben. Kōbe-ben (神戸弁) spoken in Kobe, the largest city of Hyogo, is the intermediate dialect between Banshū-ben and Osaka-ben and is well known for conjugating -yō and -tō as well as Banshū-ben.

Awaji-ben (淡路弁) spoken in Awaji Island, is different from Banshū/Kōbe-ben and mixed with dialects of Osaka, Wakayama and Tokushima Prefectures due to the intersecting location of sea routes in the Seto Inland Sea and the Tokushima Domain rule in Edo period.

=== Mie ===
The dialect in Mie Prefecture, sometimes called Mie-ben (三重弁), is made up of Ise-ben (伊勢弁) spoken in mid-northern Mie, Shima-ben (志摩弁) spoken in southeastern Mie and Iga-ben (伊賀弁) spoken in western Mie. Ise-ben is famous for a sentence final particle ni as well as de. Shima-ben is close to Ise-ben, but its vocabulary includes many archaic words. Iga-ben has a unique request expression -te daako instead of standard -te kudasai.

They use the normal Kansai accent and basic grammar, but some of the vocabulary is common to the Nagoya dialect. For example, instead of -te haru (respectful suffix), they have the Nagoya-style -te mieru. Conjunctive particles de and monde "because" is widely used instead of sakai and yotte. The similarity to Nagoya-ben becomes more pronounced in the northernmost parts of the prefecture; the dialect of Nagashima and Kisosaki, for instance, could be considered far closer to Nagoya-ben than to Ise-ben.

In and around Ise city, some variations on typical Kansai vocabulary can be found, mostly used by older residents. For instance, the typical expression ōkini is sometimes pronounced ōkina in Ise. Near the Isuzu River and Naikū shrine, some old men use the first-person pronoun otai.

=== Wakayama ===
Kishū-ben (紀州弁) or Wakayama-ben (和歌山弁), the dialect in old province Kii Province, present-day Wakayama Prefecture and southern parts of Mie Prefecture, is fairly different from common Kansai dialect and comprises many regional variants. It is famous for heavy confusion of z and d, especially on the southern coast. The ichidan verb negative form -n often changes -ran in Wakayama such as taberan instead of taben ("not eat"); -hen also changes -yan in Wakayama, Mie and Nara such as tabeyan instead of tabehen. Wakayama-ben has specific perticles. Yō is often used as sentence final particle. Ra follows the volitional conjugation of verbs as iko ra yō! ("Let's go!"). Noshi is used as soft sentence final particle. Yashite is used as tag question. Local words are akana instead of akan, omoshai instead of omoroi, aga "oneself", teki "you", tsuremote "together" and so on. Wakayama people hardly ever use keigo, which is rather unusual for dialects in Kansai.

=== Shiga ===
Shiga Prefecture is the eastern neighbor of Kyoto, so its dialect, sometimes called Shiga-ben (滋賀弁) or Ōmi-ben (近江弁) or Gōshū-ben (江州弁), is similar in many ways to Kyoto-ben. For example, Shiga people also frequently use -haru, though some people tend to pronounce -aru and -te yaaru instead of -haru and -te yaharu. Some elderly Shiga people also use -raru as a casual honorific form. The demonstrative pronoun so- often changes to ho-; for example, so ya becomes ho ya and sore (that) becomes hore. In Nagahama, people use the friendly-sounding auxiliary verb -ansu and -te yansu. Nagahama and Hikone dialects has a unique final particle hon as well as de.

=== Nara ===
The dialect in Nara Prefecture is divided into northern including Nara city and southern including Totsukawa. The northern dialect, sometimes called Nara-ben (奈良弁) or Yamato-ben (大和弁), has a few particularities such as an interjectory particle mii as well as naa, but the similarity with Osaka-ben increases year by year because of the economic dependency to Osaka. On the other hand, southern Nara prefecture is a language island because of its geographic isolation with mountains. The southern dialect uses Tokyo type accent, has the discrimination of grammatical aspect, and does not show a tendency to lengthen vowels at the end of monomoraic nouns.

== Example ==
An example of Kyoto women's conversation recorded in 1964:

| Original Kyoto speech | Standard Japanese | English |
|---|---|---|
| Daiichi, anta kyoo nande? Monossugo nagai koto mattetan e. | Daiichi, anata kyoo nande? Monosugoku nagai koto matteita no yo. | In the first place, today you... what happened? I've been waiting for a very long time. |
| Doko de? | Doko de? | Where? |
| Miyako hoteru no ue de. Ano, robii de. | Miyako hoteru no ue de. Ano, robii de. | At the top of the Miyako hotel. Uh, in the lobby. |
| Iya ano, denwa shitan ya, honde uchi, goji kitchiri ni. | Iya ano, denwa shitan da, sorede watashi, goji kitchiri ni. | Well, I called, just at 5 o'clock. |
| Okashii. Okashii na. | Okashii. Okashii na. | That's strange. Isn't that strange? |
| Hona tsuujihinkattan ya. | Jaa tsuujinakattan da. | And I couldn't get through. |
| Monosugo konsen shiteta yaro. | Monosugoku konsen shiteita desho. | The lines must have gotten crossed. |
| Aa soo ya. | Aa soo da yo. | Yes. |
| Nande yaro, are? | Nande daroo, are? | I wonder why? |
| Shiran. Asoko denwadai harootaharahen no chaunka te yuutetan e. Ookii shi. | Shiranai. Asoko denwadai o haratteinain janainoka tte itteita no yo. Ookii shi. | I don't know. "Maybe they haven't paid for the phone," I said. Because it's a big facility. |
| Soo ya. Mattemo mattemo anta kiihin shi, moo wasureteru shi, moo yoppodo denwa shiyo kana omotan ya kedo, moo chotto mattemiyo omotara yobidasahattan. | Soo da yo. Mattemo mattemo anata konai shi, moo wasureteiru shi, moo yoppodo denwa shiyoo kana to omottan da kedo, moo chotto mattemiyoo to omottara yobidashita no. | Yes. Even after I waited for a long time, you didn't come, so I thought you'd forgotten, so I thought about calling you, but just when I'd decided to wait a little longer the staff called my name. |
| Aa soo ka. Atashi. Are nihenme? Anta no denwa kiitan. | Aa soo. Watashi. Are nidome? Anata ga denwa o kiita no. | Is that so. I... Was it the second time when you heard about the phone? |
| Honma... Atashi yobidasaren no daikirai ya. | Honto.... Watashi yobidasareru no daikirai da. | Really, I hate having my name called out. |
| Kan'nin e. | Gomen ne. | Sorry. |
| Kakkowarui yaro. | Kakkowarui desho. | It's awkward, right? |

== See also ==
=== Kansai dialect in Japanese culture ===
- Bunraku - a traditional puppet theatre played in Osaka dialect during the Edo period
- Kabuki - Kamigata style kabuki is played in Kansai dialect
- Rakugo - Kamigata style rakugo is played in Kansai dialect
- Mizuna - mizuna is originally a Kansai word for Kanto word kyōna
- Shichimi - shichimi is originally a Kansai word for Kanto word nanairo
- Tenkasu - tenkasu is originally a Kansai word for Kanto word agedama
- Hamachi - hamachi is originally a Kansai word for Kanto word inada
- Tenrikyo - Since the religion was founded in the 19th century by a woman from Yamato (present-day Nara Prefecture), the scriptures she left behind contain her colloquial language, the Yamato dialect.

=== Related dialects ===
- Hokuriku dialect
- Shikoku dialect
- Mino dialect

== Bibliography ==
For non-Japanese speakers, learning environment of Kansai dialect is richer than other dialects.

- Palter, DC and Slotsve, Kaoru Horiuchi (1995). Colloquial Kansai Japanese: The Dialects and Culture of the Kansai Region. Boston: Charles E. Tuttle Publishing. ISBN 0-8048-3723-6.
  - Colloquial Kansai Japanese at Google Books
  - Kinki Japanese at Google Books
- Tse, Peter (1993). Kansai Japanese: The language of Osaka, Kyoto, and western Japan. Boston: Charles E. Tuttle Publishing. ISBN 0-8048-1868-1.
  - Kansai Japanese at Google Books
- Takahashi, Hiroshi and Kyoko (1995). How to speak Osaka Dialect. Kobe: Taiseido Shobo Co. Ltd. ISBN 978-4-88463-076-8
- Minoru Umegaki (Ed.) (1962). 近畿方言の総合的研究 (Kinki hōgen no sōgōteki kenkyū). Tokyo: Sanseido.
- Isamu Maeda (1965). 上方語源辞典 (Kamigata gogen jiten). Tokyo: Tokyodo Publishing.
- Kiichi Iitoyo, Sukezumi Hino, Ryōichi Satō (Ed.) (1982). 講座方言学7 -近畿地方の方言- (Kōza hōgengaku 7 -Kinki chihō no hōgen-). Tokyo: Kokushokankōkai
- Shinji Sanada, Makiko Okamoto, Yoko Ujihara (2006). 聞いておぼえる関西(大阪)弁入門 (Kiite oboeru Kansai Ōsaka-ben nyūmon). Tokyo: Hituzi Syobo Publishing. ISBN 978-4-89476-296-1.
