= Banshū dialect =

Japanese dialect

- Harima dialect
- 播州弁
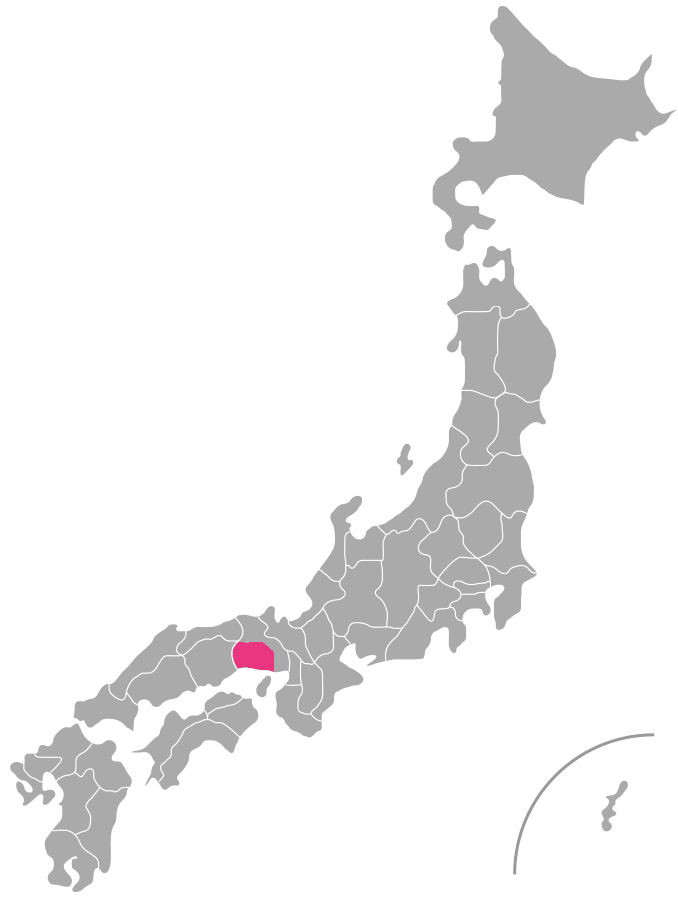
- Banshū dialect area (dark pink)
- Native to: Japan
- Region: Southwestern Hyōgo Prefecture
- Language family: Japonic: Japanese; Western Japanese; Kansai; Western; Banshū dialect

Language codes
- ISO 639-3: –
- Glottolog: bans1249

The Banshū dialect (播州弁, Banshū-ben), also called the Harima dialect (播磨弁・方言, Harima-ben/-hōgen), is a Japanese dialect spoken in the Harima region (corresponding to the boundaries of the former Harima Province) of southwestern Hyōgo Prefecture. Although it is included in the Kansai dialect group, it shares much of its vocabulary with Chūgoku group. (Note: Kiichi Iitoyo (Note: Iitoyo Kiichi (飯豊毅一)), Sukezumi Hino (Note: Hino Sukezumi (日野資純)), and Ryōichi Satō (Note: Satō Ryōichi (佐藤亮一)) A Course in Dialectology: Vol. 8, The Dialects of the Chūgoku and Shikoku Regions (Note: Kōza hōgengaku hachi chūgoku/shikoku no hōgen (講座方言学8中国・四国の方言)) Kokusho Publication Society, 1982, P. 44) It can be further subdivided into the Western Banshū dialect (西播方言, Seiban-hōgen) and the Eastern Banshū dialect (東播方言, Tōban-hōgen).

== Outline ==
The Banshū dialect is flanked by the Tajima, Okayama, Tanba, and Settsu dialects, the last two being closely related to the better-known Kyoto and Osaka dialects, respectively. In addition, the dialect, spoken between Kobe and Himeji, is distinct from the dialect of the prefectural capital. For this reason, Ryōji Kamata (Note: Kamata Ryōji (鎌田良二)) regards the Banshū dialect as the most representative of Hyōgo Prefecture, where Japanese transitions between the Kansai dialect group in the east and the Chūgoku group in the west. (Note: Ryōji Kamata A Study of the Grammar of the Dialects of Hyōgo Prefecture (Note: Hyōgo-ken hōgen bunpō no kenkyū (兵庫県方言文法の研究)) Ōfū Company (Note: Ōfū-sha (桜楓社)), 1982, pp. 49-50)

The Banshū dialect's subdivisions correspond well to the various river basins over which it is spoken. In particular, the Western Banshū dialect area comprises the Ibo River basin and the cities of Tatsuno, Aioi, Akō, and Shisō and the towns of Taishi (Ibo District), Kamigōri (Akō District), and Sayō (Sayō) on the Chikusa River basin, and the Eastern Banshū dialect area comprises the basins of the Kako, Ichi, and Yumesaki Rivers. Although Himeji City is generally considered part the Western Banshū (geopolitical) area, its subdialect is best classed with the Eastern Banshū group. Owing to the increased economic intercourse between the coastal region of the Eastern Banshū (geopolitical) area and the Osaka area, as well as the former's consequential urbanization and industrialization (see Coast of Harima Industrial Area), the coastal Eastern Banshū dialects have been influenced by the Osaka dialect.

The Funasaka Pass that marks part of the boundary between Hyōgo and Okayama Prefectures also marks the furthest western extent of the Western Banshū dialect group, and upon crossing over the pass, one encounters the Okayama dialect of the Chūgoku dialect group. However, the zone of contact between the Okayama dialect and the aforementioned subdialects of the City of Akō and of the towns of Kamigōri and Sayō has some distinctive features (as a result of dialect mixture). The Banshū area is also in contact with Awaji Island across the Akashi Strait, but that island's Awaji dialect shares common features instead with such as the Kishū and Awa dialects, and is quite distinct from Banshū. (Note: Minoru Umegaki (editor) Comprehensive Study of the Kinki Region (Note: Kinki chihō no sōgōteki kenkyū (近畿地方の総合的研究)) Sanseidō, 1962, p. 505)

== Segmental phonology ==
Where a gloss is given for either only Banshū dialect or standard Japanese, the other gloss is identical to the given one.

Like other Kansai dialects, the Banshū dialect has a minimal length restraint of two moras for phonological words. Therefore, words that are underlyingly one mora are realized with a long vowel in isolation; for example, /ki/ ("tree") and /me/ ("eye") are pronounced [kiː] and [meː], respectively, in isolation in Banshū dialect (but cf. forms with a following particle, which is considered part of the phonological word; for example with the nominative case particle =ga: ki=ga → [ki.ga] and me=ga → [me.ga], with no vowel lengthening), but [ki] and [me] in standard Japanese, which lacks the minimal length constraint. In contrast, long vowels in some grammatical forms, including the volitional and the infinitive of adjectives, are shortened (the latter only for adjectives of root length at least two moras); for example, Banshū dialect has ik-o=ka ("go.volitional=interrogative") and hay-o nar-u ("fast.infinitive become.nonpast") for standard ik-oo=ka and haya-ku nar-u, respectively (see "Euphonic changes (音便, Onbin)" for more information on the second example, which involves a euphonic change followed by monophthongization followed by vowel shortening). Also, the western subdialects have the monophthongization /ai/ to /ee/.

As in the Tanba dialect, alternations between the phonemes /d/ and /z/ are seen before all vowels. (Note: Naoya Tsuzome (Note: Tsuzome Naoya (都染直也)) "The words of our hometowns: a brief dictionary 28, Hyōgo Prefecture" (Note: Kojiten - furusato no kotoba ni-jū-hachi hyōgo-ken (〈小辞典〉ふるさとのことば28兵庫県)) Language Monthly (Note: Gekkan gengo (月刊言語)) January 2003 issue, Taishūkan Bookstore, 2003) For instance, ademichi ("footpath between rice fields"), denbu ("all"), sendai ("garden"), and atsu-i=do ("hot.nonpast=emphatic") for standard azemichi, zenbu, senzai, and atsu-i=zo, respectively. There is also some alternation with these phonemes and /r/; for example, see=∅ raite-ik-o ("Keep up the hard work!", lit. "spirit=accusative take out.continuative.volitional") for standard see=∅ dasite-ik-oo (again, this example features a euphonic change in addition to the phonological change; see below).

== Prosody ==
Throughout this section (including the table): H = high tone, L = low tone, F = falling tone, R=rising tone. Where accent descriptions come in pairs separated by a tilde, the one to the left is the form found in isolation and the one to the right is the form with an attached particle =ga (for nouns) or in the nonpast form (for verbs and adjectives), with the dash separating the noun from the particle or the verbal/adjectival root from the affix, respectively. For forms without a tilde-marked separation, an added particle or affix has the same tone as the last mora of the noun or verbal/adjectival root, and the noun or verbal/adjectival root's pitch contour is not affected by the addition. Descriptions separated by slashes are non-distinctive variations.

Accent systems of the Banshū dialect (Note: Great Encyclopedia of Hyōgo Prefecture (Pt. 2) (Note: Hyōgo-ken dai-hyakkajiten (ge) (兵庫県大百科事典(下))) Kobe Shimbun General Publishing Division, (Note: Kōbe shinbun sōgō shuppan sentā (神戸新聞総合出版センター)), 1983, pp. 944-945) (Note: The accent system of Tajima and its environs (Note: Tajima oyobi shūhen chiiki no akusento (但馬および周辺地域のアクセント)) Yutaka Taniguchi (Note: Taniguchi Yutaka (谷口裕)))
	Accent class	Example words	Keihan type		Tarui type		
	Accent class	Example words	Kobe	Ono	Taishi	Kamikawa	Sayō
2-mora nouns	2.1	ame ("candy") kama ("kettle")	HH		LH/HH		
2-mora nouns	2.2	kami ("paper") kawa ("river")	HL				
2-mora nouns	2.3	ike ("pond") iro ("color")	HL				
2-mora nouns	2.4	kama ("sickle") hashi ("chopsticks")	LH~LL-H	LH	LH/HH		
2-mora nouns	2.5a	aki ("autumn") ame ("rain")	LF~LH-L		LF~LH-L/HF~HH-L		HL
2-mora nouns	2.5b	kumo ("spider") koe ("voice")	LF~LH-L		LF~LH-L/HF~HH-L	HL	
1-mora verbs	H	tob- ("fly") ki-("wear")	H				
1-mora verbs	L	kir- ("cut") mi- ("see")	R~L-H		H		
2-mora adjectives	H	aka- ("red") ama- ("sweet")	HL		LF~LH-L/HF~HH-L (elderly speakers: LF~LH-L)		
2-mora adjectives	L	shiro- ("white") atsu- ("warm")	HL		LF~LH-L/HF~HH-L (elderly speakers: HL)		

The subdialects spoken in the southern and eastern parts of the Banshū (geopolitical) area, which comprises the cities of Akashi, Kakogawa, Takasago, Miki, Ono, Kasai, Nishiwaki, and Katō, the towns of Inami, Harima, Fukusaki, and Ichikawa, the city of Himeji (excepting the vicinity of the Hayashida-chō district) and the southern part of the town of Taka, use a Keihan type (word tone and accent) pitch accent system. Among these, Himeji, Akashi, and others use a system identical to that of Kobe (see the table at right), while the accent used in the vicinity of Nishiwaki and Ono differs in that unaccented low-tone nouns (like those in class 2.4, and also usagi ("rabbit") and midoriiro ("green")) have a pitch rise between the first and second moras rather than between the penultimate and ultimate moras (so for instance, usagi and midoriiro are LLH~LLL-H and LLLLH~LLLLL-H in the Kobe-type subdialects but LHH and LHHHH in the Ono-type subdialects). The Ono-type accents represent an older form of the Keihan-type accent.

On the other hand, the subdialects of the northern and western Banshū (geopolitical) area, which comprises the cities of Aioi, Akō, Shisō, and Tastuno, the towns of Kamikawa, Taishi, Kamigōri, and Sayō, the vicinity of the Hayashida-chō district of Himeji, and the northern part of Taka, use the Tarui type accent system. In the Keihan system, 2-mora nouns can begin with either high tone (classes 2.1, 2.2, and 2.3) or low tone (classes 2.4, and 2.5), but this opposition has been lost in the Tarui type accent (high and low tones on the first mora are in free variation). Even within the same cities and towns, there are variations by neighborhood and age, the younger generation's speech has been influenced by the standard Japanese used in the media, so while we speak of a single "Tarui type" accent system, in fact there is great diversity within that system.

2-mora nouns of the classes 2.2 and 2.3 have merged in the Keihan type system; the notation 1/23/4/5 is used to express this. The Tarui type accent of Taishi, described in the table and also employed in areas such as Akō, Tastuno, and Aioi, would then be represented 14/23/5. This is said represent the most original Tarui type accent. The accent of Kamikawa (14/235b/5a) has split the original 2.5 class, with nouns such as aki ("autumn"), ame ("rain"), ase ("sweat"), and ayu ("sweetfish") in the 2.5a class and nouns like kumo ("spider"), koe ("voice"), saru ("monkey"), and tsuru ("crane") in the 2.5b class. Generally it is thought that the pitch contour of the 2.5a class is the original, and that the nouns of the 2.5b class diverged from it. The accent of Sayō (14/235), also used in places such as Shisō, differs from the others by the presence of a high tone on the first mora of class 2.5a and 2.5b nouns; this accent system is also used in the non-Banshū dialects of the cities of Tanba in Hyōgo Prefecture and Fukuchiyama in Kyoto Prefecture, as well as that of the Ikuno-chō neighborhood of the city of Asago. The Kamikawa subdialect is believed to be in the process of abandoning its own system in favor of the 14/235 system as well. Especially among young people in the 14/235 region, a trend towards a high tone on the first mora of class 2.4 nouns is seen, perhaps due to influence from the accent system of Standard Japanese. That is to say, these regions are in the process of adopting the system of the (non-Banshū) dialect of the Asago-chō neighborhood of Asago City (1/2345). Young people even in other (non-Banshū) regions where the Tarui type accent is used are being influenced by the accent system of the standard language, and as a result the number of people in those areas who do not follow the patterns of the chart is increasing.

In regions using the Keihan system, there is a distinction made between 1-mora H- and L-verbs, as shown in the chart. Tarui type regions lack this distinction, pronouncing both classes the same (with the sole exception of the verb or- ("exist-animate"), which is F~H-L in both areas).

In the Keihan type regions, the pitch contour of 2-mora adjectives is the same as in places like Kyoto, namely HL. Tarui type regions, on the other hand, have the same pitch contour for such adjectives as in the Tajima and Okayama dialects, with either LH~LH-L or HH~HH-L in free variation. Elderly speakers of the Western Banshū dialect still preserve the distinction between H- (LF~LH-L) and L-adjectives (HL). In recent years, that distinction is in decline, with their merger into LF~LH-L that started among young people steadily becoming mainstream. (Note: Country-wide Dialect Dictionary Vol. 1 (Note: Zenkoku hōgen jiten ichi (全国方言辞典①))Teruo Hirayama)

== Grammar ==
Where a gloss is given for either only Banshū dialect or standard Japanese, the other gloss is identical to the given one.

=== Conjugation ===
There is a tendency, especially prominent with upper monograde verbs like mi- ("see") and 2-mora lower monograde verbs like uke- ("receive"), for verbs of the monograde class to be conjugated using the quadrigrade pattern; some speakers have fully migrated all monograde verbs to the quadrigrade class: (Note: Kamata (1982), pp. 52-53. The example sentences are from the same.)

- der-e der-e=∅ yu-u=n=des-u=kedo, nakanaka dera-na-i=n=des-u ("No matter how many times [I] said 'Come out, come out!', [he] didn't," lit. "come out.imperative come out.imperative=quotative say.nonpast=nominalizer=copula-polite.nonpast=concessive, by no means come out.negative.nonpast=nominalizer=copula-polite.nonpast") for standard de-ro de-ro=to yu-u (Note: Although the nonpast form of this verb is written i-u in the standard language, it has been pronounced yu-u since the Middle Japanese period, hence the transcription)=n=des-u=kedo, nakanaka de-na-i=n=des-u
- motto naka=i tsumer-i=i ("Squeeze in tighter!", lit. "some more inside=illative cram.infinitive=imperative") for standard motto naka=e tsume-te (lit. "some more inside=illative cram.gerund") (in the Banshū form, the construction infinitive + =i, a light command form usually reserved for monograde verbs and broadly equivalent to the standard use of the gerund in the same way, is used for tsumer-, a quadrigrade verb, reflecting its origin in the monograde verb tsume-, seen in the standard example)
- ota-hen=ka. kato-o=ni kukutt-oka-na ots-u=zoo ("Do [you] mean [that] to fall [off]? [Because] if [you] don't fasten [it] tightly, [it] will!", lit. fall.negative-nonpast=interrogative. tight.infinitive=adverbial fasten.do in advancenegative-conditional fall.nonpast=emphatic) for standard ochi=ya shi-na-i=ka. kata-ku kukutt-oka-na-i=to ochi-ru=zo (lit. "fall.topic do.negative.nonpast=interrogative. tight.infinitive fasten.do in advance.negative.nonpast=conditional fall.nonpast=emphatic")

The -ba ending of the provisional form fuses with the realis stem, (Note: Also called the hypothetical stem; the stem to which the provisional ending -ba attaches) with the final -e of that stem being deleted and the initial -b- of the provisional ending either changing to a palatal glide, as in ik-ya ("go.provisional") and yoker-ya ("good.provisional") for standard ike-ba and yokere-ba, respectively, or disappearing entirely, as in ik-a and yoker-a. However, in the modern Eastern Banshū dialect, the conditional form euphonic (Note: The euphonic stem is the stem to which the gerund and the forms historically derived from it, the conditional, the past, the alternative, and the past conditional, attach.) + -tara is often used in place of the provisional:

- yom-a yom-e-n=koto na-i ("[You] ought to be able to read [that] if [you] try," lit. "read.provisional read.potential.negative-nonpast=nominalizer exist-negative.nonpast") for standard yome-ba yom-e-na-i=koto=mo na-i (lit. "read.provisional read.potential.negatuve.nonpast=nominalizer=inclusive exist-negative.nonpast")

A merger of the conclusive and adnominal for adjectival nouns is also heard:

- honma=ni tassha=na=naa ("[You]'re really in good health, huh?", lit. "truth=copula-infinitive healthy=copula-nonpast=tag question") for standard hontoo=ni tassha=da=ne (lit. "truth=copula-infinitive healthy=copula-conclusive=tag question")

== Well-known speakers ==
Tsu

== See also ==
- Dialects spoken adjacently:
  - Kansai dialect group - Kobe dialect, Tanba dialect, Awaji dialect
  - Chūgoku dialect group - Tajima dialect, Okayama dialect
