= Japanese possessives =

Aspect of the Japanese language

The Japanese language has different ways of expressing the possessive relation. There are several "verbal possessive" forms based on verbs with the sense of "to possess" or "to have" or "to own". An alternative is the use of the particle no (の) between two nouns or noun phrases.

== Verbal possessives ==
=== Shoyuusuru and motsu ===
Shoyuu (所有) is a Japanese noun of Sino-Japanese origin. It translates as ‘the state of possession’ or ‘ownership’. In Japanese, nouns, mainly those of Chinese origin, may attach themselves to the verb suru (する), ‘to do’, to form a compound verb. The verb ‘to come to possess/own’, shoyuusuru, is formed in this manner. Shoyuusuru is considered a formal term, used in reference to possessions with legal certification such as cars, in comparison to the native Japanese counterpart motsu (持つ), generally meaning ‘to come to have/own/possess’. Both motsu and shoyuusuru require animate possessors and controllable alienable possessees. The possessee may be human/animate but must be controllable, for example, a possessee cannot be a father/mother and such. The possessor noun phrase is the subject, as indicated by the particle ga (が), and the possessee noun phrase is the object, which is indicated by the particle o (を).

- ジョンさんが車を所有している John-san ga kuruma wo shoyuushite iru: "John has a car" (lit. "John car possess be.");
- ジョンさんが犬を飼っている（持っている） John-san ga inu wo motte iru: "John has a dog" (lit. "John dog hold be.").

Japanese verbs do not recognise the difference between present and future form. There is no verbal conjugation which translates as ‘I will do this.’ The ‘plain’ form of the verbs shoyuusuru and motsu cannot be used to express present states. In order to do this, as seen in (1) and (2), the verb must be changed into its –te form and have the verb ‘to be (animate)’ – iru (いる) attached. This form indicates a continuous state of being – ‘I have, and I continue to have…’

3)所有する shoyuusuru
所有して shoyuushi-te
所有している shyoyuushi-te iru
‘to have/possess/own’

4)持つ motsu
持って mot-te
持っている mot-te iru
'to have/possess/own'

The sentence structure to be used when using shyoyuusuru and motsu to describe possession is

NP_{1} ga NP_{2} o Verb-te iru
Possessor Subject-marker Possessee Object-marker Verb-te iru

=== Iru and Aru ===
Iru (いる) and aru (ある) are the present/future ‘plain’ form of the verb translated as ‘to be/exist’. Iru is always used in reference to an animate subject or object, and aru always refers to an object or subject that is inanimate;

jon-san/hon wa Osaka ni i-ru/a-ru
John/book TOP Osaka LOC be-NPAST
‘John/The book is in Osaka.’

When the verb is used following an object marked with ga and a subject marked with ni (に), the translation becomes ‘to have’. For example,

jon-san ni kuruma ga a-ru
John LOC car OBJ have-PRES
‘John has a car’.

To arrive at this translation, the particle ni is read, in this context, as ‘in/at’, the place where something is at the present. So at first, the translation for (7) may be considered ‘a car is at John/in John’s presence’. In order to reach the translation ‘to have’, Tsujioka presents these two examples:

*heya ni otoko ga a-ru
Room LOC man OBJ be-PRES
‘There is a man in the room.’

jon-san ni musuko ga a-ru
John LOC son OBJ be-PRES
‘John has a son’

Sentence (8) is semantically incorrect, as aru is used in reference to an animate object. The use of musuko with aru, however, is allowed, as some kinship terms may use the ‘animacy-insensitive’ form of aru. It can then be said that there are two translations of aru/iru – ‘to be’ and ‘to have’.

Unlike shoyuusuru and motsu however, iru/aru can express relationship as well as ownership, as seen in (9) where John does not physically own his son. Rather, it is a statement expressing the relationship.

Although iru/aru sentences may have a possessee that is alienable and inalienable, it is not possible to have a modified inalienable possessee;

*jon-san ni pinku no kami ga a-ru
John LOC pink GEN hair SUB be-PRES
‘John has pink hair.’

This appears to be the only restraint, other than the animate/inanimate restrictions, and its solution will be discussed in the next section.

The sentence structure for iru/aru possessive sentences is

NP_{1} ni NP_{2} ga Verb.
Possessor LOC Possessee OBJ Verb

=== Suru ===
As mentioned, the iru/aru form of possessive sentences does not allow for modified possessees. There is however another verbal possessive which does allow for modified possessees, in fact the possessee must be modified and may only be inalienable. This is suru (する). The sentence structure for possessive suru sentences is the same as that of shyoyuusuru/motsu sentences:

NP1 ga NP2 o shi-te i-ru
Possessor SUB Possessee OBJ do-LINK be-NPAST

Suru translates as ‘do’, using the form seen in (12), shi-te iru, translates as ‘doing’. This is constructed in the same manner as shyoyuushi-te iru and mot-te iru;

13)suru
shi-te
shi-te iru
‘is doing’

As with the Shoyuu/motsu sentences, suru possessive sentences only express ownership and not relationships (as the possessee must be inalienable, as aforementioned):

jon-san ga pinku no kami o shi-te i-ru
John SUBJ pink hair GEN OBJ do-LINK be-NPAST
‘John has pink hair.’

=== Zokusuru ===
The verb zokusuru (属する) is translated as ‘to belong to’ or ‘to be affiliated with’. The verb does not indicate belonging in the sense of ownership, but rather affiliation. For example, the following is incorrect

*kono hon wa jon-san ni zokushi-te i-ru
This book TOP John NI belong-LINK be-NPAST
‘This book belongs to John.’

This sentence is grammatically incorrect. Zokusuru can only be used when describing affiliation, such as in (16):

jon-san wa ANU ni zokushi-te i-ru
John SUB ANU NI belong-LINK be-NPAST
‘John belongs to/is affiliated with the ANU.’

This verb is included in this list in order to describe the difference in translation meanings.

== Expressing possession using particle no (の) ==
=== Possession and relationships ===
The particle no (の) is used to express possession, either figuratively or literally, of one noun phrase by a second noun phrase, by indicating that the noun preceding no is the possessor, and the noun following is the possessee. Both the possessor and the possessee can be alienable or inalienable:

私 の 手
watashi no te
me GEN hand
'My hand.'

ジョン の 車
jon no kuruma
John GEN car
'John's car.'

In this way, no may modify an unlimited number of nouns, for example

私 の いぬ の ベッド
watashi no inu no beddo...
me GEN dog GEN bed...
'My dog's bed...'

In the same way, this noun-no-noun structure also indicates relationships between the possessor and uncontrollable possessees. For example,

私 の お母さん
watashi no okasan
me GEN mother
'My mother.'

ジョン の 兄
jon no ani
John GEN {big brother}
'John's big brother'

The possessee can be pronominalised by replacing it with either mono (もの), which translates as ‘one’, as in ‘John’s one’, or Ø (0 particle). Japanese often omits proper nouns and subjects once they have already been mentioned in a conversation, and which are then understood through context. In the following sentences, desu (です) the copula translates as ‘is’,

これ は ジョン の 物 です
kore wa jon no mono desu
this TOP John GEN one COP
‘This is John’s one.’

これ は ジョン の ～ です
kore wa jon no Ø desu
this TOP John GEN Ø‍ COP
‘This is John’s.’

There is a slight difference in meaning between the two pronouns. As Hirakouji states, mono-pronominalisation refers to the possessee as an objectively viewed object, while Ø-pronominalisation conveys the speaker's subjective attention to the object and inclusive contrast, and cannot appear in the ordinary focus position. Hirakouji presents the following examples (in (28), the first no is used to nominalise the preceding clause) to demonstrate how Ø-pronominalisation cannot be used in the ordinary focus position (27 is incorrect):

これ は メリー の ～ です が あれ は ジョン の ～ です
*kore wa merii no Ø desu ga, are wa jon no Ø desu
this TOP Mary GEN Ø‍ COP but, that TOP John GEN Ø‍ COP
‘This is Mary’s, but that is John’s.’

私 が 欲しい の は メリー の ～ です
watashi ga hoshii no wa merii no Ø desu
me SUB want NOM TOP Mary GEN Ø‍ COP
‘What I want is Mary’s.’

The phrase structure when using no as a possessive particle is indicated in (29). The phrase constitutes a noun phrase.

29) ([NOUN (possessor)] no [NOUN (possessee)])

== Bibliography ==
(2001). Kodansha's furigana: English-Japanese dictionary. Kodansha Ltd.: Japan.

(2001). Kodansha's furigana: Japanese-English dictionary. Kodansha Ltd.: Japan.

Possession (Linguistics). Possession (linguistics)

Baron, Irene (ed.). (et al.). (2001). Dimensions of possession. John Benjamins Publishing Company: United States.

Brown, Lesley. (Ed.). (1993). The new shorter Oxford English dictionary: Volumes I and II. Clarendon Press: Oxford.

Chino, Naoko: (2001). Japanese verbs at a glance. Kodansha International Ltd.: Japan. (2005). How to tell difference between Japanese particles: Comparisons and exercises. Kodansha International Ltd.: Japan.

Hirakouji, Kenji. (1979). ‘Ni’ and ‘no’ in Japanese. University of Los Angeles: United States.

Spahn, Mark, and Hadamitzky, Wolfgang. (1998). The learner's kanji dictionary. Charles E. Tuttle Publishing: Singapore.

Tanimori, Masahiro. (2003). Handbook of Japanese grammar. Charles E. Tuttle Publishing: Singapore.

Tsujioka, Takae. (2002). Outstanding dissertations in linguistics: The syntax of possession in Japanese. Routledge: Great Britain.
