= Shikoku dialect =

Group of Japanese dialects spoken in Shikoku, Japan

Shikoku Japanese
- Native to: Japan
- Region: Shikoku
- Language family: Japonic: Japanese; Western Japanese; Shikoku Japanese

Language codes
- ISO 639-3: –
- Glottolog: shik1243
- Shikoku dialect area. Orange: Kyoto-type pitch accent. Yellow: Kyushu-type.

The Shikoku dialects (四国方言, Shikoku hōgen) are a group of the Japanese dialects spoken on Shikoku.

The Shikoku dialects are:

- Awa dialect (Tokushima Prefecture, formerly known as Awa Province)
- Sanuki dialect (Kagawa Prefecture formerly known as Sanuki Province)
- Iyo dialect (Ehime Prefecture, formerly known as Iyo Province)
- Tosa dialect (Kōchi Prefecture, formerly known as Tosa Province)
  - Hata Dialect (Hata district, westernmost of Kochi)

The Shikoku dialect has many similarities to the Chūgoku dialect group in grammar. Shikoku dialect uses ken for "because", and -yoru in progressive aspect and -toru or -choru in the perfect. Some people in Kōchi Prefecture use kin, kini, or ki instead of ken, -yō (Hata) or -yū (Tosa) instead of -yoru, and -chō (Hata) or -chū (Tosa) instead of -choru.

The largest difference between Shikoku dialect and Chūgoku dialect is in pitch accent. Except southwestern Ehime and western Kochi (yellow area on the right map), many dialects in Shikoku use the Kyoto-Osaka-type accent or its variations, and are similar to Kansai dialect, but Chūgoku dialect uses a Tokyo-type accent.

The differences between zi and di and between zu and du, which have been lost in standard Japanese, have been preserved in the southern part of the Shikoku dialect region.
