= Sanuki dialect =

Japanese dialect of Kagawa Prefecture

- Kagawa Japanese
- Native to: Japan
- Region: Kagawa
- Native speakers: (undated figure of 1 million)
- Language family: Japonic: Japanese; Western Japanese; Shikoku; Sanuki dialect

Language codes
- ISO 639-3: –
- Glottolog: kaga1258
- IETF: ja-u-sd-jp37

Sanuki dialect (讃岐弁, Sanuki-ben) is the Japanese dialect of Kagawa Prefecture on the island of Shikoku.

== Features ==
The accent is based on the Kyoto-Osaka or Keihan accent (京阪式アクセント). There are some differences in vocabulary between the western and eastern sides of the prefecture, and the eastern and western dialects are referred to as the Tōsan Dialect (東讃弁, Tōsan-ben) and the Seisan Dialect (西讃弁, Seisan-ben) respectively.
