= Classical Japanese =

Literary form of Japanese, used until the early 20th century

- Late Old Japanese
- 文語
- Native to: Japan
- Era: Heian period, Shōwa period
- Language family: Japonic: Old Japanese; Early Middle Japanese; Classical Japanese
- Writing system: Kanji (Kyūjitai), Kana (Man'yōgana, Hiragana (Note: including Hentaigana variants), and Katakana; using Historical kana orthography)

Language codes
- ISO 639-3: –
- Emperor Hirohito's announcement of Japan's surrender in World War II, delivered in classical Japanese.

The classical Japanese language (文語, bungo; Japanese pronunciation: [bɯ̈̀ŋ́.ɡó̞, -ŋó̞, bɯ̈́ŋ́-]) lit. 'book language', also called "old writing" (古文, kobun) and sometimes simply called "Medieval Japanese", is the literary form of the Japanese language that was the standard until the Shōwa period (1926–1989). It is based on Early Middle Japanese, the language as spoken during the Heian period (794–1185), but exhibits some later influences. Its use started to decline during the late Meiji period (1868–1912) when novelists started writing their works in the spoken form. Eventually, the spoken style came into widespread use, including in major newspapers, but many official documents were still written in the old style. After the end of World War II, most documents switched to the spoken style, although the classical style continues to be used in traditional genres, such as haiku and waka. Old laws are also left in the classical style unless fully revised.

The terms bungo (文語; lit. 'written language') and kōgo (口語; [kò̞ó̞.ɡó̞, -ŋó̞, kó̞ó̞-]; lit. 'spoken language') are still used for classical and modern Japanese, respectively. Their literal meanings are only historical, as classical Japanese is no longer officially used, while modern Japanese is the only official written language, despite being labeled "spoken". These terms are often used in descriptions of grammar to distinguish classical and modern inflections. For example, the bungo inflection of the verb 書く (kaku, "to write") is quadrigrade (kaka, kaki, kaku, kake), but its kōgo inflection is quinquegrade due to a historical sound change (kaka, kakō ← kakau ← kakamu, kaki, kaku, kake).

== History ==
Classical Japanese began to be written during the Heian period, at which point it was very similar to the spoken Japanese of that time. It became the written standard for the Japanese language for many centuries, though the spoken language continued to evolve and by the Edo period was substantially different from classical Japanese. This is known as diglossia, a situation in which two forms of a language, in this case a written and spoken form, coexist. During the Meiji period, some intellectuals sought the abolition of classical Japanese, such as the Genbun Itchi (言文一致, literally "unification of spoken and written languages") movement, which proposed that written Japanese conform to the vernacular spoken language. Futabatei Shimei's 1887 novel The Drifting Cloud was one of the first novels to be written in vernacular Japanese rather than classical. By 1908, novels no longer used classical Japanese, and by the 1920s the same was true of all newspapers. Government documents remained in classical Japanese until 1946. Classical Japanese continues to be taught in Japanese high schools and universities due to its importance in the study of traditional Japanese literature and culture.

== Orthography ==
Classical Japanese is written in an orthography that differs from modern Japanese in two major ways. These are the usage of old character forms (旧字体, kyūjitai) and historical kana usage (歴史的仮名遣, rekishi-teki kana-zukai).

=== Old character forms (旧字体, kyūjitai) ===
Old character forms are the forms of Chinese characters (漢字, kanji) used in Japan before the spelling reforms that occurred after World War II. The modern, simplified characters are called new character forms (新字体, shinjitai).

A few examples follow, with the old characters on the left and the new characters on the right:

1. 體 → 体
2. 舊 → 旧
3. 當 → 当
4. 與 → 与
5. 變 → 変
6. 靜 → 静
7. 爲 → 為
8. 眞 → 真

The kana spelling of a kanji is not unique; e.g. in modern Japanese, note the difference in the reading of 体 between 体 (からだ, "physical body") and 政体 (せい‐たい, "forms of government"). The above spelling differences are etymological. For example, からだ is just a native Japanese word labeled by a Chinese character with similar meaning, while 政体 is totally a new word derived from the combination of original meanings of two Chinese characters (政 means "politics" and 體 means "body").

In cases like those of the first two, the entire original character has essentially been replaced by a new one, independent of the original's etymology. This type, however, is relatively rare. Another approach is to essentially replace the character with a piece of it, sometimes slightly altered, as in the third and fourth characters. Finally, probably the most common type of simplification is to change one component of the character to reduce the number of strokes and/or make it easier to write, a strategy exemplified by the fifth and sixth examples. Note that, as in the case of the sixth character, the simplification may be very subtle.

In general, old character forms are identical to their traditional Chinese counterparts, but there are some exceptions. For the seventh example character (爲 → 為), the traditional and simplified Japanese versions coexisted as different forms of the same traditional character in Modern Chinese, while in Japan, what is now the new character form was at that time considered a variant and rarely used. And in a few cases, like that of the eighth character (眞 → 真), the old character form has always been considered a rare variant in Modern Chinese. (However, 爲 and 眞 are actually the formal forms in Middle Chinese and Old Chinese.)

=== Historical kana usage (歴史的仮名遣, rekishi-teki kana-zukai) ===
Historical kana usage is the system of kana (i.e., phonetic character) writing used in Japan before the post-war reforms. More specifically, it is the version of kana orthography standardized in the Meiji Period (since before that time kana usage was not standardized). It is, broadly speaking, based on the pronunciation of Japanese in the Heian Period, the time-frame in which Early Middle Japanese (on which the grammar of classical Japanese is based) was spoken. There are several differences between historical kana usage—which is also referred to as "old kana usage" (旧仮名遣, kyū kana-zukai)—and the modern kana orthography, called "modern kana usage" (現代仮名遣, gendai kana-zukai) or "new kana usage" (新仮名遣, shin kana-zukai). Some of these differences apply primarily to Sino-Japanese readings of Chinese characters, while others apply primarily to native Japanese words, and still others apply equally to both groups of words.

Broadly speaking, the differences are:

==== H-Row (ハ行, ha-gyō) rule ====
- Some morpheme-medial sounds currently written as わ/ワ, い/イ, う/ウ, え/エ, and お/オ (wa, i, u, e, and o) were written as は/ハ, ひ/ヒ, ふ/フ, へ/ヘ, and ほ/ホ (ha, hi, fu, he, and ho), respectively. This is because these sounds (as well as all sounds still written with は/ハ, ひ/ヒ, ふ/フ, へ/ヘ, and ほ/ホ) originally had initial consonant /p/ in Old Japanese, which then changed to /ɸ/ in Early Middle Japanese, and then, in Late Middle Japanese, split into one of five different phonemes depending on whether it occurred morpheme-initially or morpheme-medially, and then further depending on the following vowel. Morpheme-initially and before /a/, /e/, or /o/, it became /h/; before /i/, it became /ç/; and before /u/, it became /ɸ/; these three sounds are still written with は/ハ, ひ/ヒ, ふ/フ, へ/ヘ, and ほ/ホ. Morpheme-medially and before /a/, /i/, /e/, or /o/, it became /w/; before /u/, it lost its consonant. Finally, later on in the same period of the language the initial /w/ was lost in all instances before /i/, /e/, and /o/ (note that */wu/ never existed), leaving the current morpheme-medial pronunciations of /wa/, /i/, /u/, /e/, and /o/, but the spellings of /ha/, /hi/, /fu/, /he/, and /ho/ (which, in this context, are probably better thought of as /pa/, /pi/, /pu/, /pe/, and /po/; or /fa/, /fi/, /fu/, /fe/, and /fo/). This rule primarily applies to native Japanese morphemes, although it is crucial to the mechanics of the long vowel rule that applies primarily to Sino-Japanese words, which is elaborated upon below. The modern usage of は (ha) and へ (he) to represent grammatical particles pronounced as if written わ (wa) and え (e), respectively, is a holdover from this rule.

Some examples follow (old spellings are on the left, new spellings on the right; kana in parentheses represent the pronunciation of the preceding character):

{幸せ (しあはせ)} → {幸せ (しあわせ)}
shiahase → shiawase

{小さし (ちひさし)} → {小さい (ちいさい)}
chihisa-shi → chiisa-i

{合ふ (あふ)} → {合う (あう)}
af-u → a-u

{前 (まへ)} → {前 (まえ)}
mahe → mae

{炎 (ほのほ)} → {炎 (ほのお)}
honoho → honō

There are some exceptions to this sound change, although they are rare. They include 母 (はは) (haha "mother", expected form はわ hawa), 頬 (ほほ) (hoho "cheek", expected form ほお hō), 家鴨 (あひる) (ahiru "domestic duck", expected form あいる airu), and 溢れる (あふれる) (afure-ru "overflow", expected form あおれる aore-ru or おうれる ōre-ru. Sometimes, as in the case of the first two exceptions, the sound change form exists, usually with a slightly different meaning (はわ hawa is a hyper-formal and very respectful term for mother) or is used in different contexts (ほお hō is generally used in isolation, while ほほ hoho is generally used in compounds). In other cases, as is true of the second two exceptions, the unchanged form is the only one that exists. In addition to these exceptions, some dialects may preserve these sounds as they were at any stage of the language.

==== W-row (ワ行, wa-gyō) rule ====
This section uses Nihon-shiki romanization for ゐ, ゑ, and を.

- The obsolete characters ゐ/ヰ (wi) and ゑ/ヱ (we) are used, and the character を/ヲ (wo) is used in other words besides as the accusative or oblique case marker. This relates to the above rule, in that it reflects a pronunciation with initial /w/ before /i/, /e/, and /o/ that is no longer present in the modern language. This rule applies equally to native and Sino-Japanese words. The use of を (wo) to write the aforementioned grammatical particle, which is pronounced お (o) in modern Japanese (unless preceded by ん n or sometimes in song, although all morpheme-medial instances of /o/, whether originally お, を, or ほ, tend to become /wo/ in song), is a holdover from this rule.

Some examples:

Native Japanese words

- 居る (ゐる) → 居る (いる) → いる (only in kana) (wi-ru → i-ru "to be [animate objects]")
- 聲 (こゑ) → 声 (こえ) (kowe → koe "voice") (notice that an old character is also involved in this example)
- 男 (をとこ) → 男 (おとこ) (wotoko → otoko "male")

Sino-Japanese words

- 役員 (やくゐん) → 役員 (やくいん) (yakuwin → yakuin "officer")
- 圓 (ゑん) → 円 (えん) (wen → en "Yen") (again, there is an old character used here)
- 家屋 (かをく) → 家屋 (かおく) (kawoku → kaoku "house")

There are no known exceptions (besides the aforementioned ones regarding を wo) in standard Japanese, and no dialects preserve the distinction between /wi/ and /i/, /we/ and /e/, and/or /wo/ and /o/, but some of the Ryukyuan languages (which are also descended from Proto-Japonic) do.

==== D-row (ダ行, da-gyō) rule ====
This section uses Nihon-shiki romanization for じ, ず, ぢ, づ.

- The characters ぢ/ヂ (di) and づ/ヅ (du) are used in places other than changes caused by sequential voicing (連濁 rendaku), where in modern kana じ (ji) and ず (zu), respectively, would be used. Again, this represents a former phonetic distinction, namely between a sound /z/ (in じ ji and ず zu) and a sound /d/ (in ぢ di and づ du). This rule applies equally to native and Sino-Japanese words, as well as a few loanwords (外来語 Gairaigo).

Some examples:

Native words

- 紫陽花 (あぢさゐ) → 紫陽花 (あじさい) (adisawi → azisai "hydrangea") (notice that this example also contains a change from ゐ wi to い i)
- 水 (みづ) → 水 (みず) (midu → mizu "water")

Sino-Japanese words

- 解除 (かいぢよ) → 解除 (かいじょ) (kaidiyo → kaizyo "release") (notice the use of Y-row rule, explained below)
- 地圖 (ちづ) → 地図 (ちず) (chidu → chizu "map") (notice again that an old character form is involved)

Loanwords

- ラヂオ → ラジオ (radio → razio "radio") (this one is especially notable because it is an exceedingly rare example of a sound change that occurs in a loanword from English)

There are no known exceptions in standard Japanese pronunciation, although there are many dialects (such as the Tosa dialect) that preserve the distinction between historical /z/ and /d/ in speech, usually by using /ʑi/ and /zu/ for historical /z/ and /d͡ʑi/ and /d͡zu/ for historical /d/ (see Yotsugana). In writing, the distinction is preserved in single morphemes in cases where a sequence ちぢ (chidi) or つづ (tsudu) was historically produced by rendaku (such as in 縮む (ちぢむ) chidim-u, "shorten", and 続く (つづく) tsuduk-u, "continue", pronounced as if ちじむ chizim-u and つずく tsuzuk-u, respectively), or in compounds where a phonemic /ti/ or /tu/ has been voiced to /zi/ or /zu/ (such as in 身近 (みぢか) mi-dika "one's surroundings" and 仮名遣 (かなづかい) kana-dukai "kana usage", pronounced as if みじか mi-zika and かなずかい kana-zukai, respectively). This usage is a holdover from this rule.

==== Y-row (ヤ行, ya-gyō) rule ====
In modern Japanese, the small kana ゃ/ャ, ゅ/ュ, and ょ/ョ (ya, yu, and yo) are used to indicate palatalized consonants (拗音 Yōon) when following an I-column (イ段 I-dan) kana of the K-, G-, N-, B-, P-, M-, or R-rows (カ～, ガ～, ナ～, バ～, パ～, マ～, ラ行; Ka-, Ga-, Na-, Ba-, Pa-, Ma-, Ra-gyō). For example:

- 客 (きゃく) (kyaku "guest")
- 如実 (にょじつ) (nyojitsu "reality")
- 白檀 (びゃくだん) (byakudan "sandalwood")
- ぴょこぴょこ (pyokopyoko "up and down")
- 山脈 (さんみゃく) (sanmyaku "mountain range")
- 略 (りゃく) (ryaku "abbreviation")

When a small Y-row (ヤ行 Ya-gyō) kana follows an I-column kana of the S-, Z-, T-, D-, or H-rows (サ～, ザ～, タ～, ダ～, ハ行; Sa-, Za-, Ta-, Da-, Ha-gyō), the preceding consonant is changed:

- 食 (しょく) (shoku "meal")
- 樹立 (じゅりつ) (juritsu "establish")
- 茶 (ちゃ) (cha "tea")
- ～中 (ぢゅう) (-jū "throughout [suffix]") (note that, as noted above, ぢゃ ja, ぢゅ ju, and ぢょ jo only occur in modern Japanese writing when a sequence ちゃ cha, ちゅ chu, or ちょ cho is sequentially voiced, as in this example, and the pronunciation is identical to じゃ ja, じゅ ju, and じょ jo)
- 百 (ひゃく) (hyaku "hundred") (note that the sequence /hj/ is pronounced /ç/ as noted above, but this difference is not reflected in any mainstream Japanese romanization system)

These three kana cannot follow A-row (ア行 A-gyō) or W-row (ワ行 Wa-gyō) kana in this way.

In historical kana, all of these examples are written with large kana や/ヤ, ゆ/ユ, and よ/ヨ (ya, yu, and yo). So the previous examples would be written:

- 客 (きやく) (written kiyaku, but pronounced kyaku)
- 如實 (によじつ) (written niyojitsu, but pronounced nyojitsu) (note the presence of an old character form here)
- 白檀 (びやくだん) (written biyaku, but pronounced byaku)
- ぴよこゝゝゝ (written piyokopiyoko, but pronounced pyokopyoko) (again, multiple iteration marks are used here)
- 山脈 (さんみやく) (written sanmiyaku, but pronounced sanmyaku)
- 略 (りやく) (written riyaku, but pronounced ryaku)
- 食 (しよく) (written shiyoku, but pronounced shoku)
- 樹立 (じゆりつ) (written jiyuritsu, but pronounced juritsu)
- 茶 (ちや) (written chiya, but pronounced cha)
- ～中 (ぢゆう) (written -jiyū, but pronounced -jū)
- 百 (ひやく) (written hiyaku, but pronounced hyaku)

This is the only historical kana rule that does not reflect a historical pronunciation. It is also one of only two rules (along with the geminate rule) that create ambiguity for the reader (excluding the exceptions listed above for the H-row rule). For instance, the aforementioned word 客 (kyaku) is not differentiated in historical kana from the word 規約 (kiyaku "agreement") when written in historical kana: both are written きやく (kiyaku).

==== Geminate (促音, sokuon) rule ====
The other use of small kana in modern Japanese is in the geminate consonant mark (促音 Sokuon), っ/ッ, which is a small version of つ/ツ (tsu). In native Japanese words, this symbol can be used before kana of the K-, S-, T-, and P-rows. For example,

- かっか (kakka "burning hotly")
- 真っ直ぐ (まっすぐ) (massugu "straight")
- 屹度 (きっと) (kitto "surely")
- 葉っぱ (はっぱ) (happa "leaf")

Voiced geminates are generally prohibited by Japanese phonological rules, but they occur in a few loanwords (although they are sometimes pronounced by native speakers as if they were their voiceless counterparts). For example:

- スラッガー (suraggā "slugger")
- キッド (kiddo "kid")

Kana of the N- and M-rows can also be geminate, but they are preceded by ん (n) to indicate gemination instead.

Gemination can occur in Japanese for a variety of reasons. In native words, it occurs either when a historical long vowel elides, as in the aforementioned 真っ直ぐ (massugu, originally まあすぐ maasugu), or randomly, as in the aforementioned 屹度 (kitto, originally きと kito). These examples of the geminate consonant marker, along with those found in loanwords, are written with large つ (tsu) in historical kana. Therefore,

- かつか (written katsuka, but pronounced kakka)
- 真つ直ぐ (まつすぐ) (written matsusugu, but pronounced massugu)
- 屹度 (きつと) (written kitsuto, but pronounced kitto)
- 葉つぱ (はつぱ) (written hatsupa, but pronounced happa)
- スラツガー (written suratsugā, but pronounced suraggā)
- キツド (written kitsudo, but pronounced kiddo)

In these cases, the historical usage is not reflecting any historical pronunciation. However, in Sino-Japanese words, geminate consonants are produced by different, more regular processes, and the historical usage for these words reflects historical pronunciations.

The most common way for geminates to be produced in Sino-Japanese words is by the elision of a vowel from the kana き, く, ち, or つ (ki, ku, chi, or tsu). For example:

- 適格 (てっかく) (tekkaku "eligible", from teki + kaku)
- 学期 (がっき) (gakki "semester", from gaku + ki)
- 日程 (にってい) (nittei "schedule", from nichi + tei)
- 雑誌 (ざっし) (zasshi "magazine", from zatsu + shi)

In historical kana, where the geminate mark is used in the first, second, and fourth examples, a full-sized version of the original kana is used. However, in the third example, つ (tsu) is used, even though an /i/ has been elided. The reason for this is that in Early Middle Japanese, when these sounds were borrowed from Middle Chinese, the Japanese language acquired a final /t/ in the Sino-Japanese morphemes that currently end in ち (chi, /ti/) or つ (tsu, /tu/). Later on, these acquired two forms, one with /i/ and one with /u/ (although in syllables beginning with /ni/, one form usually begins with /zi/, as is the case with 日). So the semantic difference between Sino-Japanese syllables ending in /ti/ or /tu/ is almost always trivial, and the historical pronunciation was identical, so they were not distinguished in writing. Therefore, the previous examples would be written:

- 適格 (てきかく) (tekikaku)
- 學期 (がくき) (gakuki) (note the old character form)
- 日程 (につてい) (nitsutei)
- 雜誌 (ざつし) (zatsusi) (note the old character form)

Occasionally, gemination may also result from a loss of a vowel after ふ (fu, originally /pu/). These cases are complicated by the H-row rule, and perhaps because of that, are also written with つ in historical kana. For example,

- 法師 (ほっし) (hosshi "Buddhist priest", from hofu + shi)

is written

- 法師 (ほつし) (hotsushi)

in historical kana.

While this usage does reflect a historical pronunciation, it, like the Y-row rule, produces ambiguity. Furthermore, since these vowels are elided in some compounds but not others, this usage obscures the difference in a way that is essentially impossible to predict.

While there are a few other processes that can cause geminates in Sino-Japanese words, they all apply to N- and M-row kana, and are not written differently in historical and modern kana.

==== Labialized consonant (合拗音, gōyōon) rule ====
Starting in Early Middle Japanese, as more and more Chinese characters were borrowed into Japanese, the language acquired consonants fronted with glides. Those fronted with the palatal glide are described in the Y-row rule, but Early Middle Japanese also introduced consonants fronted with labial glides (i.e., CwV). These were far more limited in range than their palatal counterparts, however, affecting only the K- and G- rows. instead of /a/, /u/, and /o/ for the vowels of onset, like the palatal glides, the vowels of onset for the labial glides were /a/, /i/, and /e/, and used the kana わ, ゐ, and ゑ (wa, wi, and we). Finally, while the palatal glides are written with an I-column kana, the labial glides are written with a U-column (ウ段 U-dan) kana. However, when historical kana was standardized in the Meiji Period, only the syllables with historical /wa/ were indicated. Nevertheless, some classical texts may indicate the other differences, and some resources will refer to them, so it is useful to be familiar with them. This rule applies exclusively to Sino-Japanese words. Some examples:

くわ (written kuwa, but pronounced kwa) and ぐわ (written guwa, but pronounced gwa) (indicated in standard historical kana)

- 菓子 (くわし) → 菓子 (かし) (kwashi → kashi "sweets")
- 元旦 (ぐわんたん) → 元旦 (がんたん) (gwantan → gantan "New Year's Day")

くゐ (written kuwi, but pronounced kwi), ぐゐ (written guwi, but pronounced gwi), くゑ (written kuwe, but pronounced kwe), and ぐゑ (written guwe but pronounced gwe) (not indicated in standard historical kana)

- 歸省 (くゐせい) → 帰省 (きせい) (kwisei → kisei "homecoming") (note the old character form)
- 僞善 (ぐゐぜん) → 偽善 (ぎぜん) (gwizen → gizen "hypocrisy") (note the old character form)
- 番犬 (ばんくゑん) → 番犬 (ばんけん) (bankwen → banken "watchdog")
- 同月 (どうぐゑつ) → 同月 (どうげつ) (dougwetsu → dougetsu "same month")

Labialized consonants sometimes occur in modern loanwords, and they are generally dealt with in one of two ways. Firstly, the labialized consonant may be changed from a sequence /CwV/ to a sequence /CuwV/, both in writing and in speech. For example,

- クイック (kuikku "quick", from English "quick" with original /kw/)

In other cases, they may be indicated with a U-column kana followed by a small A-row kana, indicating a labialized consonant. For example,

- クィーン (kwīn "queen", from English "queen" with original /kw/)

However, in these cases, an alternative version with large A-row kana generally exists (as it does in this case), indicating a monophthong pronunciation, and many speakers use the monophthong pronunciation regardless of how it is written.

There are no known exceptions to this rule, but some dialects (such as the Kagoshima dialect) preserve the distinction.

==== Classical auxiliary verb む (mu) rule ====
Modern Japanese has the moraic nasal ん (n), which can represent a variety of sounds depending on what sounds come before and after it. Syllable final nasals are believed by many scholars to have existed in Proto-Japonic, but all agree that they were lost by the time of Old Japanese. They first re-appeared in Early Middle Japanese, with the introduction of Middle Chinese loanwords ending in -n and -m. Therefore, the majority of occurrences of ん (n) in modern Japanese occur in Sino-Japanese vocabulary. Originally, syllabic n and m were phonemically and phonologically distinct, although the distinction was never written down, and was lost by Early Modern Japanese. For example,

- 漢字 (かんじ) (kanzi, from Middle Chinese hɑnᴴd͡zɨᴴ)
- 音樂 (おんがく) (ongaku, from Middle Chinese ʔiɪmŋˠʌk̚; originally pronounced omgaku) (note the old character form)

However, some native Japanese words also have ん (n). This happens exceedingly rarely, and usually results from sound elision. An exhaustive list of every example out of all regular-use characters with the syllabic nasal in their native Japanese readings numbers only 13 characters (0.61% of the regular-use set) giving rise to 14 readings. They are

From the elision of a vowel following /m/ or /n/

- 何 (なん) (nan "what"), from なに (nani "what")
- 女 (をんな) (wonna "woman"), originally pronounced womna; from をみな (womina "woman") (in modern orthography, おんな onna and おみな omina)
- 懇ろ (ねんごろ) (nengoro "courteous"), originally pronounced nemkoro; from ねもころ (nemokoro "courteous")
- 神 (かん) (kan "god" in some compounds), originally pronounced kam; from かみ (kami "god") (in modern orthography, 神, using a new character form)
- 考ふ (かんがふ) (kangaf-u "consider"), from かむがふ (kamugaf-u "consider"); note that these are the classical versions of the modern verbs 考へる (かんがへる) (kangahe-ru) and 考へる (かうがへる) (kaugahe-ru), respectively (in modern orthography, かんがう kangau, こうがう kōga-u, かんがえる kangae-ru, and こうがえる kōgae-ru, respectively)

From the elision of a full mora

- 冠 (かんむり) (kanmuri "crown"), from かうぶり (kauburi "rank"); note also the sound change from /b/ to /m/ (in modern orthography, かうぶり kauburi is こうぶり kōburi)
- 問 (とん) (ton "wholesale" in the compound 問屋 ton'ya "wholesale store"), from とひ (tohi "query") (in modern orthography, とひ tohi is とい toi)
- 盛ん (さかん) (sakan "prosperous"), from さかり (sakari "one's best days")
- 芳し (かんばし) (kanba-shi "fragrant"), from かぐはし (kaguha-si "fragrant"); note also the sequential voicing of /h/ to /b/, and that these are the classical forms of the adjectives 芳しい (かんばしい) (kanba-shii) and 芳しい (かぐはしい) (kaguha-shii) (in modern orthography, かぐはし kaguha-shi is かぐわし kaguwa-shi and かぐはしい kaguha-shii is かぐわしい kaguwa-shii)

From the preservation of an Old Japanese pre-nasalized consonant in a modern Japanese word

- 鑑みる (かんがみる) (kangami-ru "learn from"), from かゞみる (kagami-ru "learn from") (in modern orthography, かゞみる kagami-ru is かがみる kagami-ru, without iteration marks)
- 丼 (どんぶり) (donburi "porcelain bowl"), from どぶり (doburi "[sound symbolism for something big and soft plopping down]")

From abbreviation of another pronunciation on this list

- 丼 (どん) (don "porcelain bowl"), originally pronounced dom; from aforementioned どんぶり (donburi "porcelain bowl")

From multiple processes

- 御 (おん) (on "[honorific prefix]"), originally pronounced om; from 大 (おほ) (oho "great") + 御 (み) (mi "august"), which became 大御 (おほみ) (ohomi "august"), and then 御 (おほん) by elision of /i/ after /m/, and finally 御 (おん) (on) by elision of the full mora /ho/; note the use of the character 御 instead of 大御 is ateji (in modern orthography, おほ oho is おお ō, おほみ ohomi is おおみ ōmi, and おほん ohon is おおん ōn)

From some semantic (rather than phonetic) process

- 四 (よん) (yon "four"), from よ (yo "four) by analogy with Sino-Japanese 三 (さん) (san "three", originally pronounced sam)

Of course, there are also some words with this sound that either lack Chinese characters or were coined in the modern or Early Modern Japanese eras, when ん (n) had been fully incorporated into the language. For example,

- さん (san "[all-purpose honorific]"), originally pronounced sam; from 樣 (さま) (sama "[respectful honorific]") (in modern orthography, the new character form 様 is used)

Regardless of how it came to be, the Japanese orthography lacked the character ん/ン (n) or any equivalent. Therefore, until the spelling reforms of 1900, む/ム (mu) was generally used to represent the syllabic nasal. Sometimes, this convention may be preserved by modern writers, but standard historical kana distinguishes む (mu) from ん (n).

There is one exception. In classical Japanese, there is an auxiliary verb (助動詞 jodōshi) む (mu) which indicated the volitional. It, too, underwent vowel elision, and came to be pronounced as /m/ and then /n/. However, the conventions of standard historical kana call for this auxiliary verb (and any word derived from it) to be written with む (mu) even though they are pronounced as ん (n).

Since the auxiliary verb む (mu) is non-existent in modern Japanese, there are no dialects that preserve the distinction expressed in this rule. However, some may preserve the distinction between final /m/ and /n/.

=== Miscellaneous ===
Two other significant differences involve the way that kana are used in general, rather than which kana are used. The first is that Chinese characters in classical texts are often fully marked with ruby text (振り仮名, furigana), especially in old laws and other very important documents. Ruby text is still widely used in modern Japanese, but only for characters with non-standard or ambiguous pronunciations, or sometimes in materials designed for children or foreigners. The second difference is that, especially in legal documents, katakana was often used for okurigana (送り仮名), to write out adjective and verb inflections, suffixes, and particles, and for the aforementioned ruby text, for both of which hiragana is generally used today.

Kana iteration marks were far more common in classical Japanese, and sometimes used in ways that are considered completely obsolete in modern Japanese. Additionally, most modern Japanese punctuation was not used.

For an example of a major document written in the classical style, see as an example the original text of the 1890 Meiji Constitution, which is written in classical Japanese using historical kana, old character forms, kana iteration marks, and katakana in place of hiragana (although it lacks universal ruby text), and completely without punctuation.

== Grammar ==
=== Verbs (動詞, dōshi) ===
==== Conjugation table ====
Classical Japanese has the following verb classes and stem forms:

Inflectional form = (stem) + Inflectional suffix

Inflectional Class 活用の種類	Inflectional form 活用形							Translation
Inflectional Class 活用の種類	stem 語幹	Irrealis 未然形	Infinitive 連用形	Conclusive 終止形	Attributive 連体形	Realis 已然形	Imperative 命令形	Translation
Quadrigrade 四段	聞(き) (-i)	きか (-a)	きき (-i)	きく (-u)		きけ (-e)		'hear'
Upper Monograde 上一段	–	み (-i)		見(み)る (m-iru)		みれ (-ire)	みよ (-i[yo])	'see'
Upper Monograde 上一段	用(もち)	もちゐ (-wi)		もちゐる (-wiru)		もちゐれ (-wire)	もちゐよ (-wiyo)	'use'
Lower Monograde 下一段	–	け (-e)		蹴(け)る (-eru)		けれ (-ere)	けよ (-e[yo])	'kick'
Upper Bigrade 上二段	過(す)	すぎ (-i)		すぐ (-u)	すぐる (-uru)	すぐれ (-ure)	すぎよ (-iyo)	'pass'
Lower Bigrade 下二段	受(う)	うけ (-e)		うく (-u)	うくる (-uru)	うくれ (-ure)	うけよ (-e[yo])	'receive'
K-irregular カ変	–	こ (-o)	き (-i)	来(く) (-u)	くる (-uru)	くれ (-ure)	こ (-o)	'come'
S-irregular サ変	–	せ (-e)	し (-i)	爲(す) (-u)	する (-uru)	すれ (-ure)	せよ (-e[yo])	'do'
S-irregular サ変	期(き)	きせ (-se)	きし (-si)	きす (-su)	きする (-suru)	きすれ (-sure)	きせよ (-seyo)	'set the date'
N-irregular ナ変	死(し)	しな (-a)	しに (-i)	しぬ (-u)	しぬる (-uru)	しぬれ (-ure)	しね (-e)	'die'
R-irregular ラ変	有(あ)	あら (-a)	あり (-i)		ある (-u)	あれ (-e)		'be, exist'

Note that most S-irregular is the combination of a noun and 爲(す); for example, 期(き)す is a combination of the noun 期(き) ('date') and 爲(す).

The よ (yo) at the end of the imperative forms is optional in classical Japanese, although exceedingly common.

==== Verb class distribution ====
While the many conjugation classes may seem overwhelming, most of them contain few verbs. The quadrigrade and lower bigrade classes are the primary, containing about 75% and 20% of the verbs in the language, respectively. The upper bigrade class is small (about 56 non-compound verbs), but sizable enough to make an exhaustive list difficult. The other 6 classes all together contain between 22 and 28 verbs, depending on whether basic compound verbs are included or not. An exhaustive list of these follows, with verbs in the conclusive form, as is the most common standard. Chinese character pronunciations are indicated by hiragana in parentheses following the given character. The first spelling listed for a given verb is the most common, and those that follow are alternative spellings. Some of these spellings are generally used for slightly different connotations of the same verb, while others are simple alternatives. In later reference, only the first spelling (in classical orthography) will be used, and the transcription will be based on the historical spelling. A blank cell in one (or both) of the "modern" columns indicates that the modern transcription is the same as the classical.

Japanese (Classical orthography)	Japanese (Modern orthography)	Romanization (Classical orthography)	Romanization (Modern orthography)	Translation
上一段活用動詞 (Kami ichidan katsuyō dōshi "Upper monograde conjugation class verbs")
着る (きる)		Ki-ru		To wear
似る (にる)		Ni-ru		To resemble
煮る (にる)		Ni-ru		To boil
嚏る (ひる)		Hi-ru		To sneeze
干る, 乾る (ひる)		Hi-ru		To dry
簸る (ひる)		Hi-ru		To winnow
廻る, 回る (みる)		Mi-ru		To go around
見る, 視る, 觀る (みる)	見る, 視る, 観る (みる)	Mi-ru		To see
鑑みる (かゞみる)	鑑みる (かがみる)	Kagami-ru		To learn from
顧みる, 省みる (かへりみる)	顧みる, 省みる (かえりみる)	Kaherimi-ru	Kaerimi-ru	To reflect upon
試みる (こゝろみる)	試みる (こころみる)	Kokoromi-ru		To try
射る (いる)		I-ru		To shoot (an arrow)
沃る (いる)		I-ru		To douse (with water)
鑄る (いる)	鋳る (いる)	I-ru		To cast (metal)
居る (ゐる)	居る (いる)	Wi-ru	I-ru	To sit
率る, 將る (ゐる)	率る, 将る (いる)	Wi-ru	I-ru	To carry (constantly)
率ゐる (ひきゐる)	率いる (ひきいる)	Hikiwi-ru	Hikii-ru	To lead (an army)
用ゐる (もちゐる)	用いる (もちいる)	Mochiwi-ru	Mochii-ru	To use
下一段活用動詞 (Shimo ichidan katsuyō dōshi "Lower monograde conjugation class verbs")
蹴る (ける)		Ke-ru		To kick
カ行変格活用動詞 (Ka-gyō henkaku dōshi "K-irregular verbs")
來 (く)	来 (く)	K-u		To come
サ行変格活用動詞 (Sa-gyō henkaku katsuyō dōshi "S-irregular conjugation class verbs")
爲 (す)	為 (す)	S-u		To do
御座す (おはす)	御座す (おわす)	Ohas-u	Owas-u	To be/go/come (honorific form)
ナ行変格活用動詞 (Na-gyō henkaku katsuyō dōshi "N-irregular conjugation class verbs")
往ぬ, 去ぬ (いぬ)		In-u		To go away
死ぬ (しぬ)		Shin-u		To die
ラ行変格活用動詞 (Ra-gyō henkaku katsuyō dōshi "R-irregular conjugation class verbs")
有り, 在り (あり)		Ar-i		To exist
在すかり, 坐すかり (いますかり)		Imasukar-i		To exist (honorific form)
侍り (はべり)		Haber-i		To serve (humble form)
居り (をり)	居り (おり)	Wor-i	Or-i	To be

===== Table notes =====
Note that these translations are glosses, and may not reflect certain nuances or rare alternative meanings.

In addition, the translations are for the classical meaning of the verb, which may differ from the modern meaning of the verb if it has survived into modern Japanese either slightly (e.g., 着る (きる) ki-ru, which meant "to wear [in general]" in classical Japanese, but means "to wear [from the waist up]" in modern Japanese), or significantly (e.g., 居る (ゐる) wi-ru, which meant "to sit" in classical Japanese, but primarily means "to be" (for animate objects) in modern Japanese). Some may have the same meaning, but a different pronunciation (e.g., 鑑みる (かゞみる) kagami-ru "to learn from", which is generally pronounced and written 鑑みる (かんがみる) kangami-ru in modern Japanese). Also, even for those verbs which have survived with the same meaning and form, many are archaic and rarely used in modern Japanese (e.g., 嚏る (ひる) hi-ru "to sneeze", with the same modern meaning and form, but almost never used). On the other hand, some have kept the same meaning, form, and prominence into the modern language (e.g., 見る (みる) mi-ru "to see", one of the oldest surviving verbs in the language and also one of the most common, both in classical and modern texts).

在すかり (imasukar-i "to exist", honorific form) has three pronunciation variants, each of which can use either Chinese character: 在すがり (いますがり) / 坐すがり (いますがり) (imasugar-i), 在そかり / 坐そかり (imasokar-i), and 在そがり / 坐そがり (imasogar-i).

Finally, the "modern" transcriptions are purely orthographic. For example, the modern version conclusive form of the classical verb 來 (く) (k-u "to come") is 来る (くる) (k-uru), but the modern form is given in the table as 来 (く) (k-u), which is the way that a modern Japanese writer would write the classical Japanese word, rather than the way they would write the modern Japanese word.

==== Adjectives (形容詞, keiyōshi) ====
Classical Japanese has the following classes of adjectives and stem forms:

Class of Inflection	subclass	stem 語幹	Irrealis 未然形	Adverbial 連用形	Conclusive 終止形	Attributive 連体形	Realis 已然形	Imperative 命令形	Translation
-ku ク活用	main 本活用	高(たか)	(たかく / たかけ)	たかく (-ku)	たかし (-si)	たかき (-ki)	たかけれ (-kere)		'be high'
-ku ク活用	-kari カリ活用	高(たか)	たかから (-kara)	たかかり (-kari)		たかかる (-karu)		たかかれ (-kare)	'be high'
-siku シク活用	main 本活用	美(うつく)	(うつくしく / うつくしけ)	うつくしく (-siku)	うつくし (-si)	うつくしき (-siki)	うつくしけれ (-sikere)		'be beautiful'
-siku シク活用	-kari カリ活用	美(うつく)	うつくしから (-sikara)	うつくしかり (-sikari)		うつくしかる (-sikaru)		うつくしかれ (-sikare)	'be beautiful'

===== Table notes =====
The existence of irrealis form is still a controversy. Some scholars assume that the ancient construction called ク語法 (Ku-gohō "Ku-grammar") uses the irrealis form to form nouns from verbs and adjectives; e.g., 安し (やすし) (yasu-shi "peaceful") → 安け (やすけ) (yasu-ke) + ～く (-ku) → 安けく (やすけく) (yasukeku "peace of mind"). Meanwhile, others assumed the construction ～くば (-kuba) / ～しくば (-shikuba) appears to be an irrealis form ～く (-ku) / ～しく (-shiku) + particle ～ば (-ba) (since that particle usually attaches to the irrealis form). However, the scholars agreeing with "Ku-grammar theory" argue that it's actually ～く (-ku) / ～しく (-shiku) + particle は (ha; modern pronunciation wa) with a sequential voicing sound change from は (ha) to ば (ba).

The compound forms are derived from continuative form ～く (-ku) / ～しく (-shiku) + 有り (ar-i) → ～くあり (-kuar-i) / ～しくあり (-shikuar-i), which then became ～かり (-kar-i) / ～しかり (-shikar-i) by regular sound change rules from Old Japanese. The forms then follow the R-irregular conjugation type like 有り (ar-i), but lack the conclusive form.

Similarly, the basic conjugations have no imperative form. When it is used, therefore, the ～かれ (-kar-e) / ～しかれ (-shikar-e) forms are used. It is however, relatively rare, even in classical Japanese.

==== Adjectival verbs (形容動詞, keiyō dōshi) ====
There are the following classes for adjectival verbs:

Class of inflection	stem語幹	Irrealis未然形	Adverbial連用形	Conclusive終止形	Attributive連体形	Realis已然形	Imperative命令形	Translation
Nari ナリ活用	静(しづ)か	しづかなら(-nara)	しづかなり(-nari)	しづかなり(-nari)	しづかなる(-naru)	しづかなれ(-nare)		'be static'
Nari ナリ活用	静(しづ)か	しづかなら(-nara)	しづかに(-ni)	しづかなり(-nari)	しづかなる(-naru)	しづかなれ(-nare)		'be static'
Tari タリ活用	悄(せう)然(ぜん)	悄然たら(-tara)	悄然たり(-tari)	悄然たり(-tari)	悄然たる(-taru)	悄然たれ(-tare)		''be quiet, soft"
Tari タリ活用	悄(せう)然(ぜん)	悄然たら(-tara)	悄然と(-to)	悄然たり(-tari)	悄然たる(-taru)	悄然たれ(-tare)		''be quiet, soft"

===== Table notes =====
Adjectival verbs are essentially nouns(or stems of the adjectives) combined with an auxiliary verb, either ～なり (-nar-i) or ～たり (-tar-i).

Most tari-adjectival nouns are derived from Sino-Japanese vocabulary. For example, 悄(せう)然(ぜん)たり is derived from 悄然, a Chinese word meaning “quietly, softly”.

The auxiliary verbs are derived from directional particles に (ni) + ～有り (-ar-i) and と (to) + ～有り (-ar-i), respectively, yielding にあり (niar-i) and とあり (toar-i), respectively, which then lead to なり (nar-i) and たり (tar-i), respectively, by regular sound change rules. They therefore follow the R-irregular conjugation like 有り (ar-i).

As with adjectives, the imperative form is rare, but is used.

==== Miscellaneous ====
灯(とう)台(だい) 下(もと) 暗(くら)し
Toudai moto kurashi

The particle は is omitted more often than in the spoken style.

女(をんな)は 三界(さんがい)に 家(いへ)なし
Wonna-ha sangai-ni ihe-nashi

== See also ==
- Old Japanese
- Literary language
