= Jōdai Tokushu Kanazukai =

Japanese writing system

Jōdai Tokushu Kanazukai (上代特殊仮名遣; lit. Special kana orthography of the early era) is an archaic kana orthography system used to write Old Japanese during the Nara period. Its primary feature is to distinguish between two groups of syllables that later merged.

The existence and meaning of this system is a critical point of scholarly debate in the study of the history of the Japanese language.

== Syllables ==
The following are the syllabic distinctions made in Old Japanese.

a	i		u	e		o	
ka	ki_{1}	ki_{2}	ku	ke_{1}	ke_{2}	ko_{1}	ko_{2}
ga	gi_{1}	gi_{2}	gu	ge_{1}	ge_{2}	go_{1}	go_{2}
sa	si		su	se		so_{1}	so_{2}
za	zi		zu	ze		zo_{1}	zo_{2}
ta	ti		tu	te		to_{1}	to_{2}
da	di		du	de		do_{1}	do_{2}
na	ni		nu	ne		no_{1}	no_{2}
pa	pi_{1}	pi_{2}	pu	pe_{1}	pe_{2}	po	
ba	bi_{1}	bi_{2}	bu	be_{1}	be_{2}	bo	
ma	mi_{1}	mi_{2}	mu	me_{1}	me_{2}	mo_{1}	mo_{2}
ya			yu	ye		yo_{1}	yo_{2}
ra	ri		ru	re		ro_{1}	ro_{2}
wa	wi			we		wo	

Those syllables marked in gray are known as jōdai tokushu kanazukai.

== Transcription ==
The two groups merged by the 9th century. It predates the development of kana, and the phonetic difference is unclear. Therefore, an ad hoc transcription system is employed.

Syllables written with subscript 1 are known as type A (甲, kō) and those with subscript 2 as type B (乙, otsu) (these are the first two celestial stems, and are used for such numbering in Japanese).

There are several competing transcription systems. One popular system places a diaeresis above the vowel: ï, ë, ö. This typically represents i_{2}, e_{2}, and o_{2}, and assumes that unmarked i, e, and o are i_{1}, e_{1}, and o_{1}. It does not necessarily have anything to do with pronunciation. There are several problems with this system.

- It implies a particular pronunciation, indirectly on the vowel.
- It neglects to distinguish between words where the distinction is not clear, such as the /to/ in /toru/ as well as in /kaditori/.
- It implies the unmarked Type A form is the pronunciation of syllables which do not distinguish Type A vs Type B, such as si or po. (These non-distinguishing syllables are sometimes known as Type C (丙 hei), to keep them separate from both Type A and Type B.)

Another system uses superscripts instead of subscripts.

The "Yale System" writes the type A vowels i_{1}, e_{1}, o_{1} as yi, ye, wo, and writes i_{2}, e_{2}, o_{2} as iy, ey, o̠. When vowels lack the Type A vs. Type B distinction they are given unmodified spellings (i e o). Consequently, the type C syllables are distinguishable from both A and B type without any presumption of which, if any, of the other types they shared pronunciations with. These spellings are despite their appearance not intended as reconstructions, but as abstract notations that represent Old Japanese spelling without any commitment to the pronunciation.

== Meaning ==
There are many hypotheses to explain the distinction. However, it is not clear whether the distinction applied to the consonant, vowel, or something else. There is no general academic agreement.

== Usage ==
A word is consistently, without exception, written with syllables from a specific group. For example, /kami_{1}/ "above" and /kami_{2}/ "god". While both words end in /mi/ in later Japanese, mi_{1} cannot substitute for mi_{2} or vice versa. This strict distinction exists for all of the syllables marked in gray.

This usage is also found in the verb morphology. The quadrigrade conjugation is as follows:

Verb class	Irrealis	Adverbial	Conclusive	Attributive	Realis	Imperative
Quadrigrade	-a	-i_{1}	-u	-u	-e_{2}	-e_{1}

The verb /sak-/ "bloom" has quadrigrade conjugation class. Thus, its conjugation is as follows:

Verb class	Irrealis	Adverbial	Conclusive	Attributive	Realis	Imperative
Verb	saka	saki_{1}	saku	saku	sake_{2}	sake_{1}

Before the jōdai tokushu kanazukai discovery, it was thought that quadrigrade realis and imperative shared the same form: -e. However, after the discovery, it became clear that realis was -e_{2} while imperative was -e_{1}.

Also, jōdai tokushu kanazukai has a profound effect on etymology. It was once thought that /kami/ "above" and /kami/ "god" shared the same etymology, a god being an entity high above. However, after the discovery, it is known that "above" is /kami_{1}/ while "god" is /kami_{2}/. Thus, they are distinct words.

== Man'yōgana chart ==
The following chart lists syllable and man'yōgana correspondences.

Table of man'yōgana one character represents one mora
	–	K	S	T	N	P	M	Y	R	W	G	Z	D	B
a	阿安英足鞅	可何加架香蚊迦	左佐沙作者柴紗草散	太多他丹駄田手立	那男奈南寧難七名魚菜	八方芳房半伴倍泊波婆破薄播幡羽早者速葉歯	萬末馬麻摩磨満前真間鬼	也移夜楊耶埜八矢屋	良浪郎樂羅等	和丸輪	我何賀	社射謝耶奢装蔵	陀太大嚢	伐婆磨魔
i_{1}	伊怡以異已移射五	氣支伎岐企棄寸吉杵來	子之芝水四司詞斯志思信偲寺侍時歌詩師紫新旨指次此死事准磯爲	知智陳千乳血茅	二貳人日仁爾儞邇尼泥耳柔丹荷似煮煎	比必卑賓日氷飯負嬪臂避匱	民彌美三參水見視御		里理利梨隣入煎	位爲謂井猪藍	伎祇藝岐儀蟻	自士仕司時尽慈耳餌兒貳爾	遅治地恥尼泥	婢鼻彌
i_{2}	伊怡以異已移射五	貴紀記奇寄忌幾木城	子之芝水四司詞斯志思信偲寺侍時歌詩師紫新旨指次此死事准磯爲	知智陳千乳血茅	二貳人日仁爾儞邇尼泥耳柔丹荷似煮煎	非悲斐火肥飛樋干乾彼被秘	未味尾微身実箕		里理利梨隣入煎	位爲謂井猪藍	疑宜義擬	自士仕司時尽慈耳餌兒貳爾	遅治地恥尼泥	備肥飛乾眉媚
u	宇羽汙于有卯鴉得	久九口壟苦鳩來	寸須周酒州洲珠數酢栖渚	都豆荳通追川津	奴努怒農濃沼宿	不否布負部敷経歴	牟武無模務謀六	由喩遊湯	留流類		具遇隅求愚虞	受授殊儒	豆荳頭弩	夫扶府文柔歩部
e_{1}	衣依愛榎	祁家計係價結鶏	世西斉勢施背脊迫瀬	堤天帝底手代直	禰尼泥年根宿	平反返弁弊陛遍覇部辺重隔	売馬面女	曳延要遙叡兄江吉枝衣	禮列例烈連	廻恵面咲	下牙雅夏	是湍	代田泥庭傳殿而涅提弟	弁便別部
e_{2}	衣依愛榎	氣既毛飼消	世西斉勢施背脊迫瀬	堤天帝底手代直	禰尼泥年根宿	閉倍陪拝戸経	梅米迷昧目眼海	曳延要遙叡兄江吉枝衣	禮列例烈連	廻恵面咲	義氣宜礙削	是湍	代田泥庭傳殿而涅提弟	倍毎
o_{1}	意憶於應	古姑枯故侯孤兒粉	宗祖素蘇十拾	刀土斗度戸利速	努怒農埜	凡方抱朋倍保宝富百帆穂本	毛畝蒙木問聞	用容欲夜	路漏	乎呼遠鳥怨越少小尾麻男緒雄	吾呉胡娯後籠兒悟誤	俗	土度渡奴怒	煩菩番蕃
o_{2}	意憶於應	己巨去居忌許虛興木	所則曾僧増憎衣背苑	止等登澄得騰十鳥常跡	乃能笑荷	凡方抱朋倍保宝富百帆穂本	方面忘母文茂記勿物望門喪裳藻	與余四世代吉	呂侶	乎呼遠鳥怨越少小尾麻男緒雄	其期碁語御馭凝	序叙賊存茹鋤	特藤騰等耐抒杼	煩菩番蕃

== Development ==
The distinction between /mo_{1}/ and /mo_{2}/ is only made in the oldest text: Kojiki. After that, they merged into /mo/.

In later texts, confusion between types A and B can be seen. Nearly all of the A/B distinctions had vanished by the Classical Japanese period. As seen in early Heian period texts such as Kogo Shūi, the final syllables to be distinguished were /ko_{1}, go_{1}/ and /ko_{2}, go_{2}/. After the merger, CV_{1} and CV_{2} became CV.

== See also ==
- Kogo Shūi, an 807 text that maintains several historical phonetic distinctions
- Tōdaiji Fujumonkō, a c. 9th-century text that maintains the /ko_{1}, ko_{2}/ distinction

== Bibliography ==
- Omodaka, Hisataka (1967). Jidaibetsu Kokugo Daijiten: Jōdaihen (in Japanese). Sanseidō. ISBN 4-385-13237-2.
- Ōno, Susumu. Kanazukai to Jōdaigo (in Japanese). Iwanami Shoten.
