= Cultural Property (Japan) =

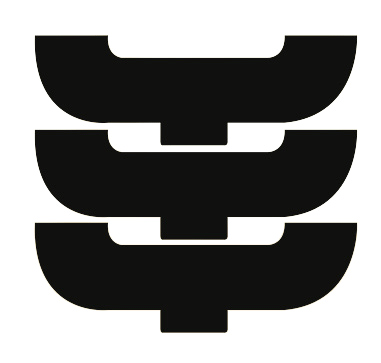
The Protection of Cultural Properties logo represents a tokyō (斗きょう), an element of Japanese architecture which stands for the continuity in time of cultural property protection.

A cultural property (文化財, bunkazai) is administered by the Japanese government's Agency for Cultural Affairs (Ministry of Education, Culture, Sports, Science and Technology), and includes tangible properties (structures and works of art or craft); intangible properties (performing arts and craft techniques); folk properties both tangible and intangible; monuments historic, scenic and natural; cultural landscapes; and groups of traditional buildings. Buried properties and conservation techniques are also protected. Together these cultural properties are to be preserved and utilized as the heritage of the Japanese people. (Note: Not all cultural properties of Japan were created in Japan; some are from China, Korea or other countries. See for example the letter from Duarte de Menezez to Toyotomi Hideyoshi, pictured above, a National Treasure originating in India. In total, some 857 important cultural properties are Chinese in origin, 96 from Korea, 27 from the West, and three from elsewhere.文化庁 | 文化財 | 文化財の紹介 | 有形文化財（美術工芸品）. Archived from the original on June 25, 2012.)

To protect Japan's cultural heritage, the Law for the Protection of Cultural Properties contains a "designation system" (指定制度) under which selected important items are designated as cultural properties, (Note: For the purpose of this article, the term cultural properties is an official designation) which imposes restrictions on the alteration, repair, and export of such designated objects. Designation can occur at a national (国指定文化財), prefectural (都道府県指定文化財) or municipal (市町村指定文化財) level. As of 2026, there are approximately 17,000 nationally designated, 23,000 prefecturally designated, and 100,000 municipally designated properties (one property may include more than one item). Besides the designation system there also exists a "registration system" (登録制度), which guarantees a lower level of protection and support.

== Categories of designated cultural properties ==
The Law for the Protection of cultural properties 1950 classifies items designated as cultural properties in the following categories:

=== Tangible cultural properties ===
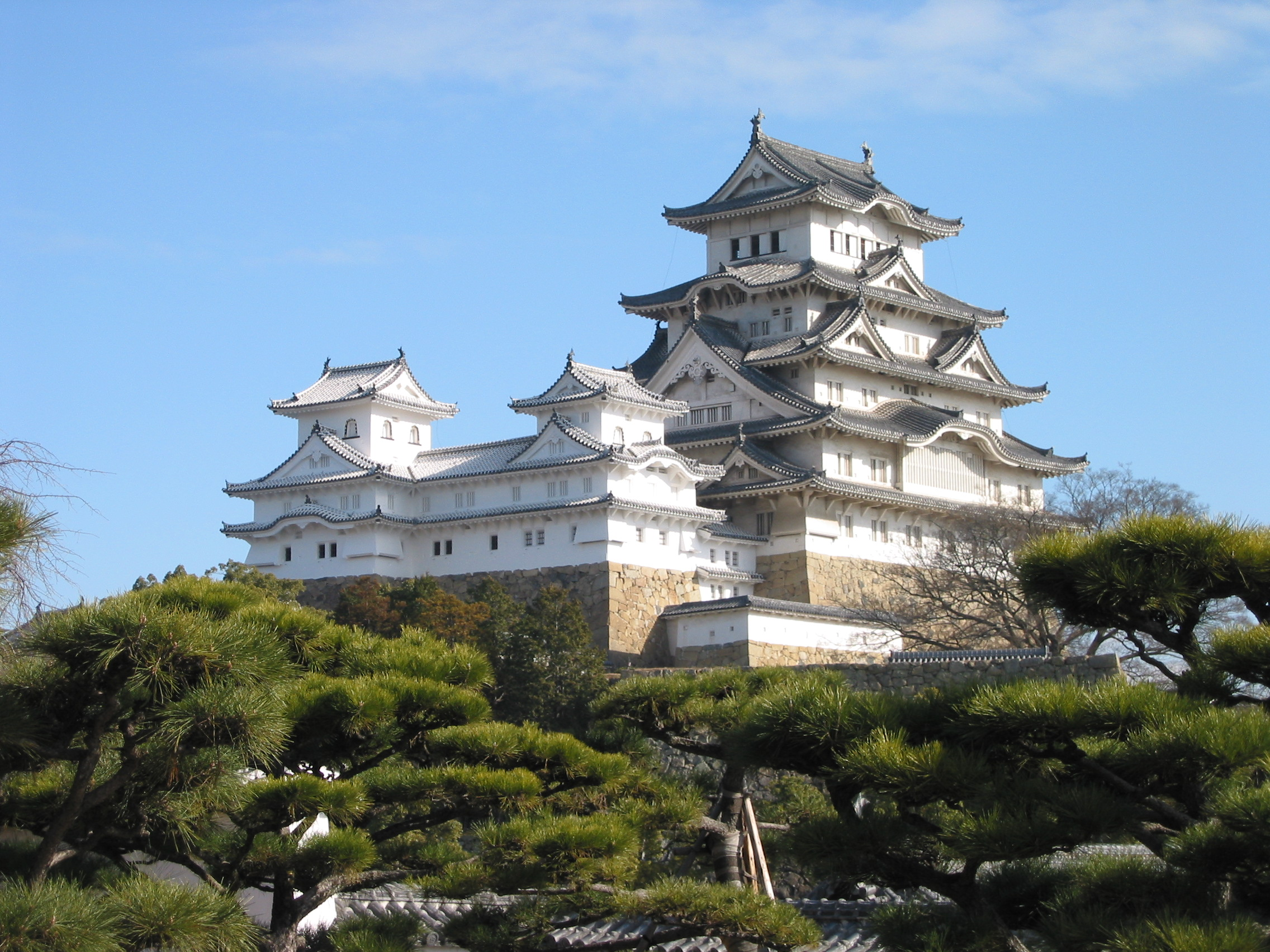
Himeji Castle's keep, designated a National Treasure in 1951 (UNESCO World Heritage Site)

Tangible cultural properties (有形文化財, yūkei bunkazai) are cultural products of high historical or artistic value whether structures (shrines, temples, other buildings), works of art (paintings, sculpture), craft works, calligraphic works, ancient documents, archaeological materials, historic materials and other such items. All objects which are not structures are termed "works of fine arts and crafts".

Items designated tangible cultural properties can then, if they satisfy certain criteria, be designated important cultural properties (重要文化財, jūyō bunkazai) (Note: The term is often shortened into just jūbun (重文).) or national treasures (国宝, kokuhō) for especially valuable items.

Any alteration to important cultural properties and national treasures requires governmental permission and exportation is forbidden, except when authorized. The National Treasury supports the conservation and restoration of these items, and the Commissioner for Cultural Affairs provides technical assistance for their administration, restoration, public display and other activities. Conservation work is performed by an item's owner, with financial support available for large expenses. Because many items are made of wood, bark and other flammable materials, they are often extremely susceptible to fires. Owners are therefore given subsidies to install fire and other disaster prevention systems.

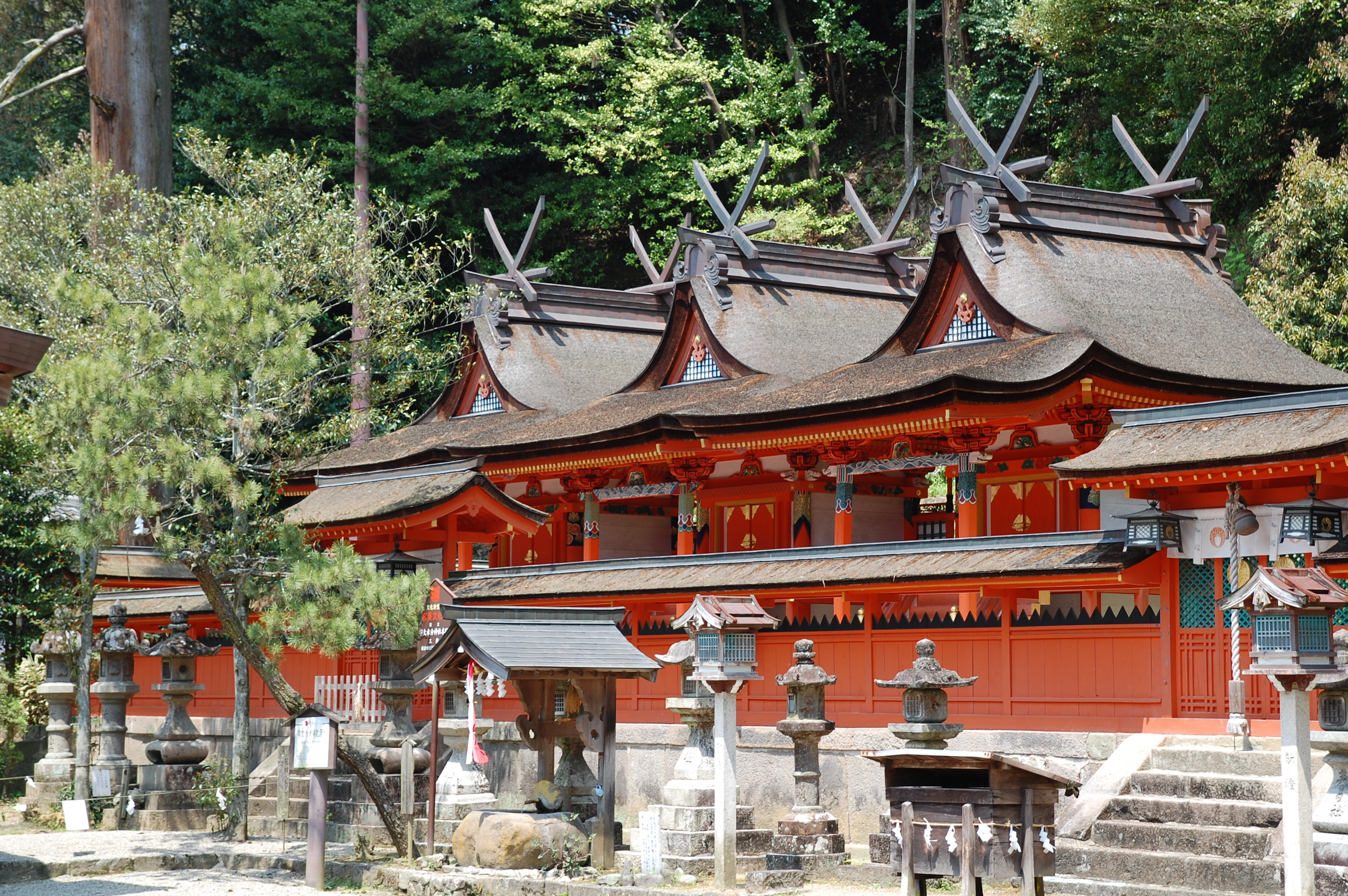
Uda Mikumari Shrine in Uda, Nara

As of 2 July 2026, there were 13,558 important cultural properties (including 1,149 national treasures), of which approximately one fifth were structures. By class, there were 2,070 (167) paintings; (Note: The number between brackets represents national treasures, included in the total) 2,743 (142) sculptures; 2,486 (254) crafts; 1,937 (236) calligraphic works; 799 (63) ancient documents; 675 (51) archaeological materials; 243 (3) historical materials; and 2,605 (233) structural designations, including 5,597 (303) individual structures. As of 1 May 2025, there were a further 13,526 designations at prefectural and 62,376 at municipal level.

=== Intangible cultural properties ===
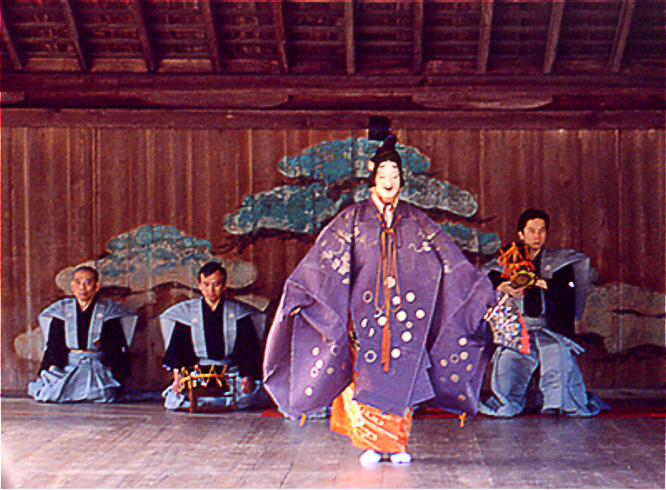
Noh performance at Itsukushima Shrine

Intangible cultural properties (無形文化財, mukei bunkazai) are cultural products of high historical or artistic value such as drama, music, and craft techniques.

Items of particular importance can be designated as important intangible cultural properties (重要無形文化財, jūyō mukei bunkazai). Recognition is also given to the 'holders' of the necessary techniques, to encourage their transmission. There are three types of recognition: individual recognition, collective recognition, and group recognition. Special grants of two million yen a year are given to individual holders (the so-called National Living Treasures) to help protect these properties. The government also contributes part of the expenses incurred either by the holder of the intangible cultural property during training of his successor, or by a recognized group for public performances.

To promote understanding, and therefore the transmission across generations, of these cultural properties, exhibitions concerning them are organized. The government through the Japan Arts Council also holds training workshops and other activities to educate future generations of noh, bunraku, and kabuki personnel.

As of 2 July 2026, there were 70 important intangible cultural properties, with, as of 1 May 2025, a further 164 designations at prefectural and 607 at municipal level.

=== Folk cultural properties ===
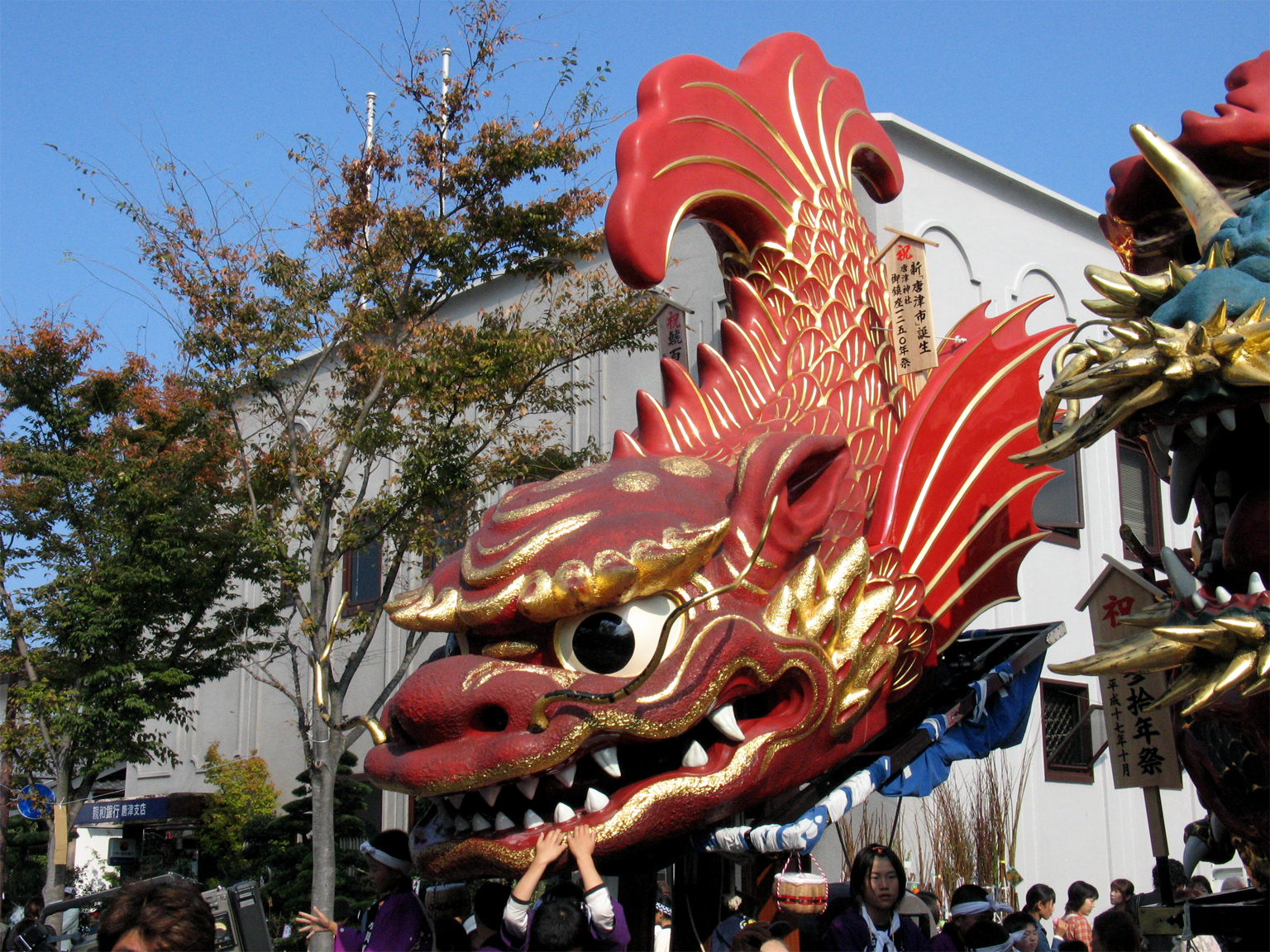
Kyūshū's Karatsu Kunchi festival was designated an important intangible folk cultural property in 1980.

Folk cultural properties are items indispensable to understand the role and influence of tradition in the daily life of the Japanese, such as manners and customs related to food, clothing, work, religion; folk performing arts; and folk techniques used to produce the mentioned folk cultural properties.

Folk cultural properties can be classified as intangible or tangible.

Intangible folk cultural properties (無形民俗文化財, mukei minzoku bunkazai) are items such as manners and customs related to food, clothing and housing, occupation, religion, and annual events; folk performing arts; and folk techniques used in connection with the mentioned items.

Clothes, tools and implements, houses and other objects used together with intangible folk cultural properties are classified as tangible folk cultural properties (有形民俗文化財, yūkei minzoku bunkazai).

Folk cultural properties can then, if they satisfy certain criteria, be designated important tangible folk cultural properties (重要有形民俗文化財, jūyō yūkei minzoku bunkazai) or important intangible folk cultural properties (重要無形民俗文化財, jūyō mukei minzoku bunkazai).

The government subsidizes projects for the restoration, administration, preservation, utilization, disaster prevention, etc. of important tangible folk cultural properties. In the case of important intangible folk cultural properties, public subsidies help local governments and other entities fund projects to train successors, restore or acquire props, tools and other objects.

As of 2 July 2026, there were 229 important tangible and 342 important intangible folk cultural properties, with, as of 1 May 2025, a further 779/1732 designations at prefectural and 5,198/6,523 at municipal level.

=== Monuments ===
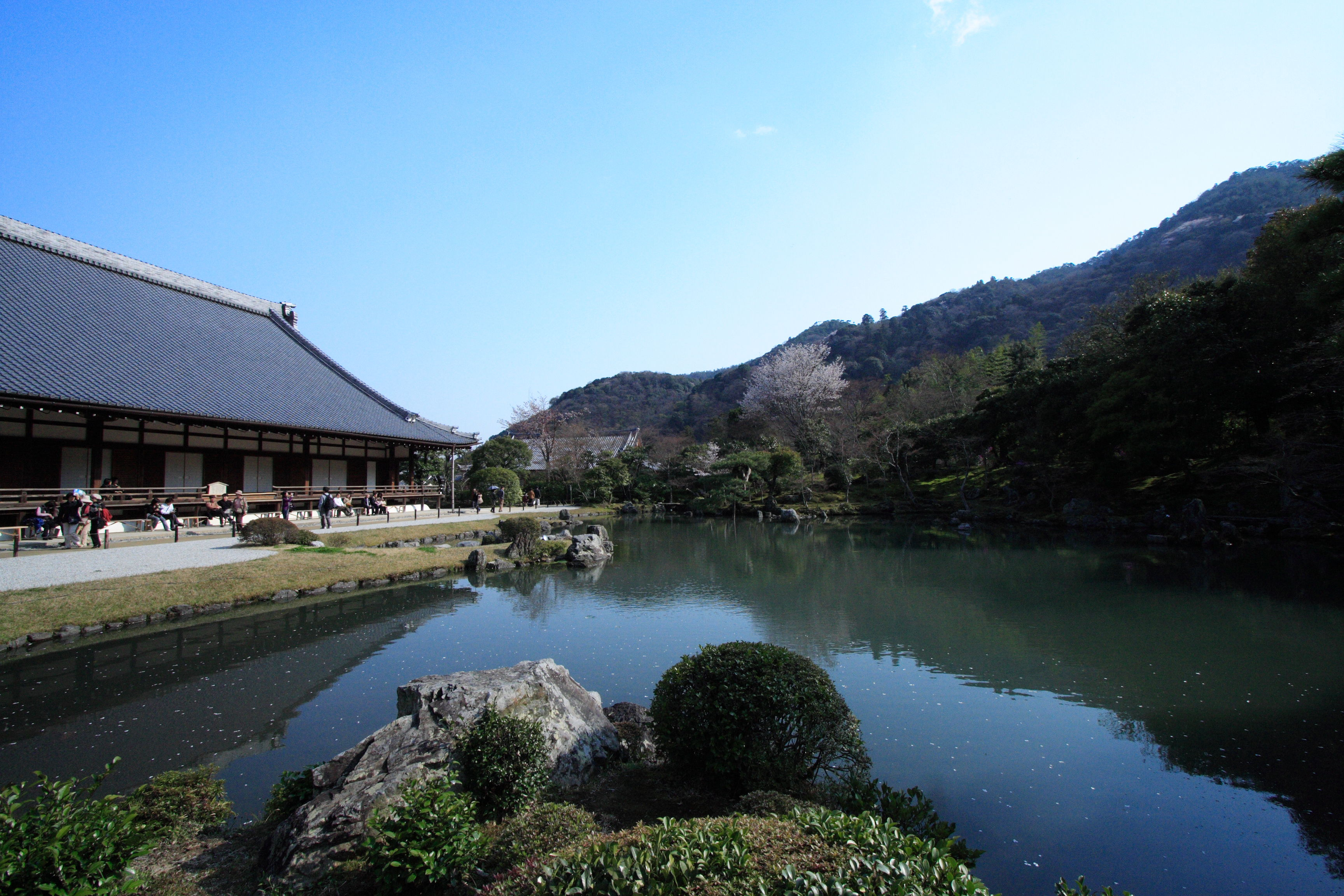
The garden of Tenryū-ji in Kyoto is a designated Special Place of Scenic Beauty.

Monuments (記念物, kinenbutsu) include historic locations such as shell mounds, ancient tombs, sites of palaces, sites of forts or castles, monumental dwelling houses and other sites of high historical or scientific value; gardens, bridges, gorges, mountains, and other places of great scenic beauty; and natural features such as animals, plants, and geological or mineral formations of high scientific value.

The government designates "significant" items classifying them in three categories: historic sites (史跡, shiseki), places of scenic beauty (名勝, meishō), and natural monuments (天然記念物, tennen kinenbutsu). Items of particularly high significance receive higher classifications: special historic sites (特別史跡, tokubetsu shiseki), special places of scenic beauty (特別名勝, tokubetsu meishō), and special natural monuments (特別天然記念物, tokubetsu tennen kinenbutsu) respectively.

Alterations to the existing state of a site or activities affecting its preservation require permission from the Commissioner for Cultural Affairs. Financial support for purchasing and conserving designated land and for the utilization of the site is available through local governments.

As of 2 July 2026, there were 1,923 (66) historic sites; 433 (36) places of scenic beauty; and 1,042 (75) natural monuments (including special natural monuments). As of 1 May 2025, there were a further 6,321 designations at prefectural and 24,730 at municipal level. A single designation can be classed under more than one of these categories; the number is for primary classification (for instance Hamarikyū Gardens in Tokyo are classed as a special place of scenic beauty, with a secondary classification as a special historic site; for the purpose of these counts it would be a special place of scenic beauty).

=== Cultural landscapes ===
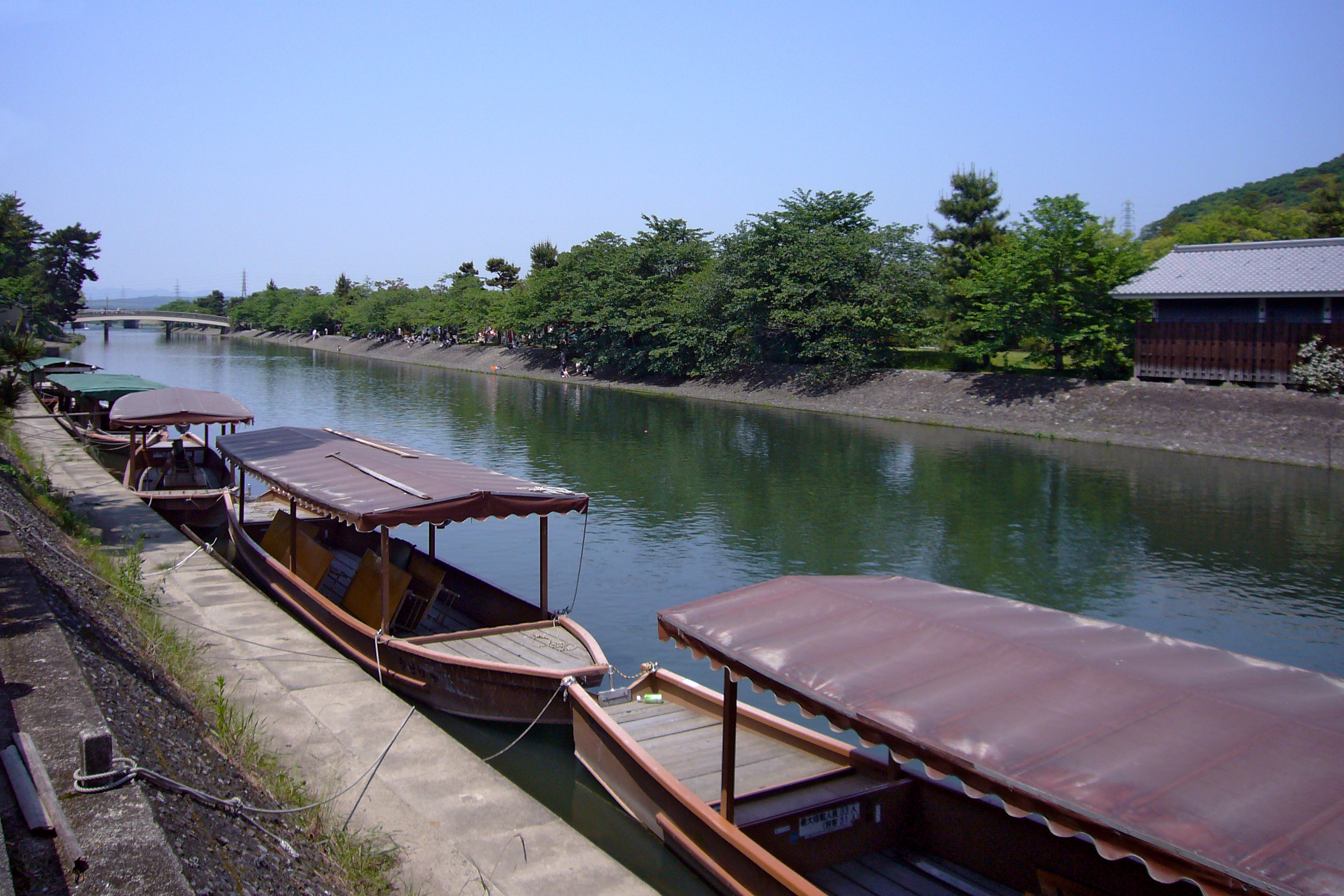
The city of Uji near Kyoto is an important cultural landscape.

Cultural landscapes (文化的景観, bunkateki keikan) are landscapes which have evolved together with the people who inhabit them and with the geocultural features of a region, and which are indispensable to understand the lifestyle of the Japanese. They can be terraced rice fields, mountain villages, waterways and the like. Items of particular importance can be designated as important cultural landscapes.

As of 2 July 2026, 74 areas in Japan have been designated important cultural landscapes, with, as of 1 May 2025, a further 10 designations at prefectural and 20 at municipal level.

=== Groups of traditional buildings ===
Groups of traditional buildings (伝統的建造物群, Dentōteki kenzōbutsu-gun) is a category introduced by a 1975 amendment of the law which mandates the protection of groups of traditional buildings which, together with their environment, form a beautiful scenery. They can be post towns, castle towns, mining towns, merchant quarters, ports, farming or fishing villages, etc.

Municipalities can designate items of particular importance as Preservation Districts for Groups of Traditional Buildings and approve measures to protect them. Items of even higher importance are then designated important Preservation Districts for Groups of Traditional Buildings by the central government. The government's Agency for Cultural Affairs then provides guidance, advice, and funds for repairs and other work. Additional support is given in the form of preferential tax treatment.

As of 2 July 2026, 129 groups of traditional buildings have been nationally designated, with, as of 1 May 2025, a further 1 designation at prefectural and 130 at municipal level.

== Buried cultural properties ==
Buried cultural properties (埋蔵文化財, maizō bunkazai) are cultural properties, such as tombs, caves, and ruins, which are buried into the ground.

About 460,000 ruin locations are presently known to exist in Japan. The protective measures taken include restrictions on their excavation. Any investigative excavation and construction work in the vicinity of a known site requires a notification. If preservation of the site is impossible, developers are required to cover expenses necessary to carry out an excavation, record any data and preserve what is possible. In cases when charging these expenses is not possible, local public organizations carry out the investigation with public funds.

Any object found under the ground must be given to police, except when its owner is known. The object is then investigated to determine if it qualifies as a cultural property. Any cultural property whose owner is not known becomes as a rule property of the prefecture.

== Conservation techniques for cultural properties ==
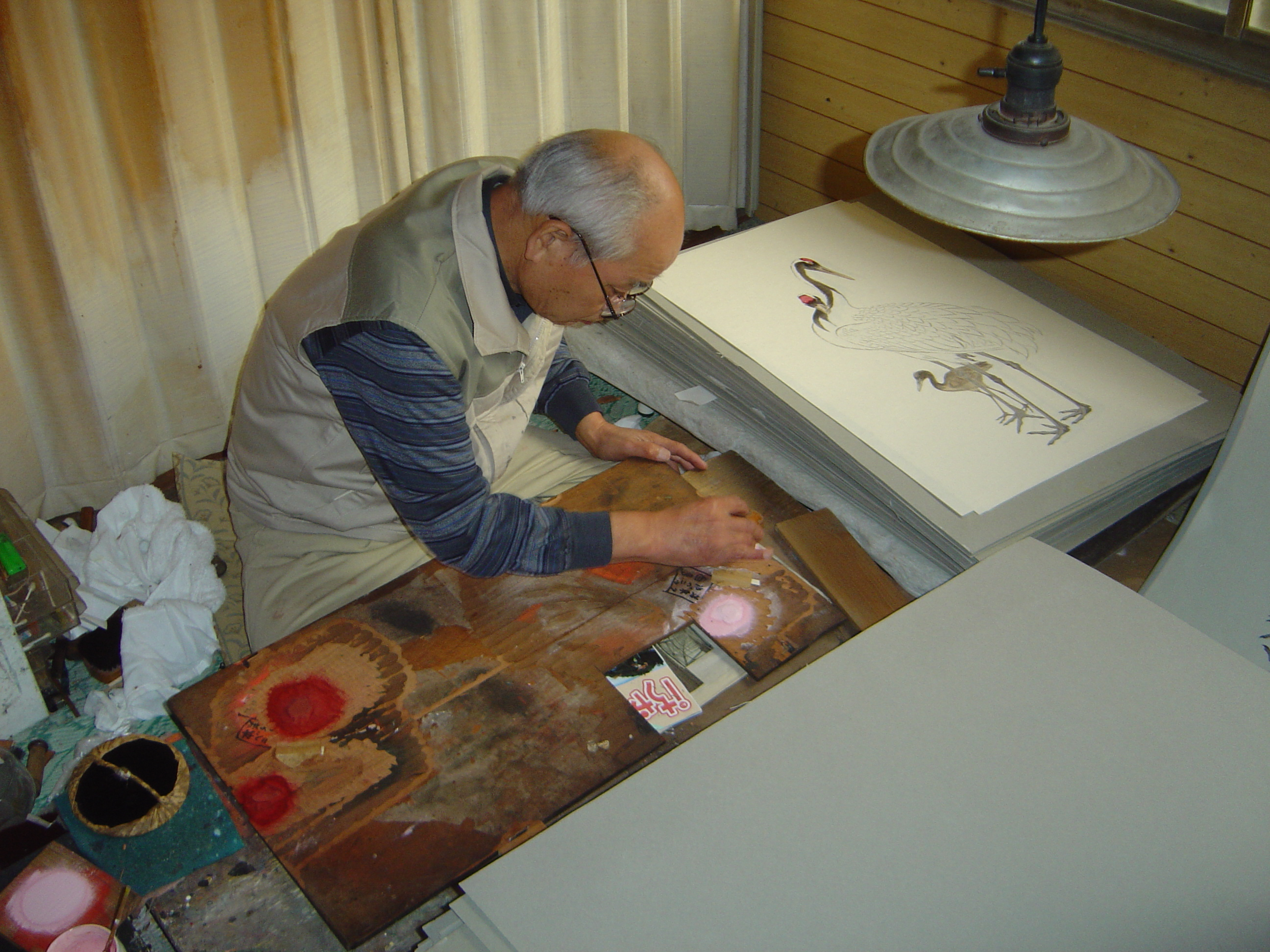
Ukiyo-e woodblock printing is a protected technique.

Techniques for the production of materials necessary for restoration and conservation, and the techniques of restoration and conservation themselves are not cultural properties, and are classified as Conservation Techniques for cultural properties.

This form of protection was approved in 1975 (see below) and was made necessary by the disappearance of skilled craftsmen as a result of the industrialization. The techniques protected by the law applied to tangible and intangible cultural properties and included the mounting of paintings and calligraphy on scrolls, the repair of lacquerware and wooden sculptures, and the production of Noh masks, costumes and instruments. The minister of education can designate techniques indispensable for conservation as Selected Conservation Techniques. Examples of nominated entities in the field of architecture are the Japanese Association for Conservation of Architectural Monuments (for repairs and woodwork), the National Association for the Preservation of Roofing Techniques for Shrines and Temples (techniques for organic roofing materials: cypress bark, shingles, thatch) and the Association for the Conservation of Cultural Properties (paintings and lacquering of architectural monuments) In addition to the prestige associated with the nomination, the government provides subsidies for training, courses and documentation.

As of 2 July 2026, there were 87 conservation techniques at a national level, with, as of 1 May 2025, a further 12 at prefectural and 18 at municipal level.

== Categories of registered cultural properties ==
Besides the above "designation system" (指定制度), there exists a "registration system" (登録制度), which guarantees a more modest level of protection. The existing categories are:

=== Registered tangible cultural properties ===
Compared to designated important cultural properties and national treasures, registered tangible cultural properties (登録有形文化財) entail fewer responsibilities for the owner. Loss, damage, change of ownership and intended changes that affect more than 25 percent of the visible surface need to be announced. On the other side, the owner is eligible for low interest loans for maintenance and repairs, subsidies for an architect and tax reductions of up to 50 percent. This new protection level is based on notification, guidance, and advice, and aims at voluntary protection of cultural properties by their owners. As of 2 July 2026, there were 14,758 registered structures and 18 registered works of art or craft.

=== Registered tangible folk cultural properties ===
Items particularly in need of preservation and utilization can become registered tangible folk cultural properties (登録有形民俗文化財). As of 2 July 2026, there were 55 registered properties.

=== Registered monuments ===
Monuments from the Meiji period onward which require preservation can be registered as registered monuments (登録記念物), thereby gaining a moderate level of protection based on notification and guidance. As of 2 July 2026, 149 monuments were registered under this system.

=== Registered intangible cultural properties ===
As of 2 July 2026, there were 7 registered intangible cultural properties (登録無形文化財).

=== Registered Intangible folk cultural properties ===
As of 2 July 2026, there were 9 registered intangible folk cultural properties (登録無形民俗文化財).

== History of the preservation of cultural properties ==
=== Background ===
Most cultural properties in Japan used to belong to Buddhist temples and Shinto shrines, or were handed down in aristocratic and samurai families. Feudal Japan came to an abrupt end in 1867/68 when the Tokugawa shogunate was replaced by a new system of government with the so-called Meiji Restoration. Largely because of the official policy of separation of Shinto and Buddhism and of the anti-Buddhist movements that advocated the return to Shinto, a large number of Buddhist buildings and artwork were destroyed in an event known as haibutsu kishaku (literally "abolish Buddhism and destroy Shākyamuni"). In 1871 the government confiscated the lands of temples, which were seen as a symbol of the previous ruling elite, and expropriated the properties of the feudal lords, causing the loss of historic castles and residences. It is estimated that nearly 18,000 temples closed during this time. Another factor that had a big influence on the cultural heritage was the increased industrialization and westernization, which accompanied the restoration and led to the impoverishment of Buddhist and Shinto institutions, the decay of temples and the export of valuable objects.

=== 1871 plan for the preservation of ancient artifacts ===
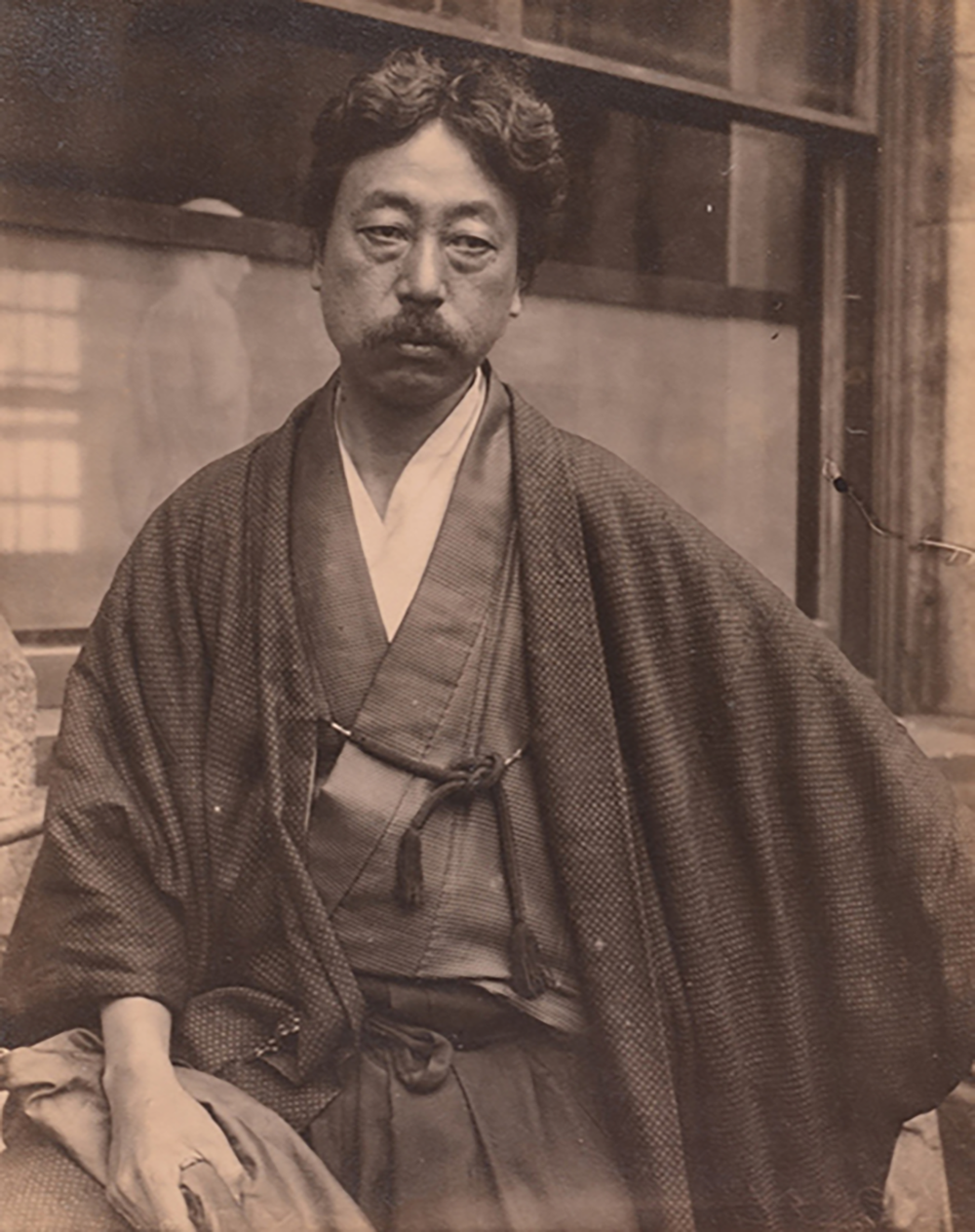
Okakura Kakuzō

On recommendation of universities, in 1871 the Department of State (Dajō-kan) issued a decree for the protection of antiquities, the Plan for the Preservation of Ancient Artifacts (古器旧物保存方, koki kyūbutsu hozonkata), ordering prefectures, temples and shrines to compile lists of suitable important buildings and art treasures. However, in the face of radical westernization, these efforts ground to a halt. Starting in 1880, the government allotted funds for the preservation of ancient shrines and temples. (Note: In connection with the establishment of "State Shinto", shrines had received annual funds since 1874.) By 1894, 539 shrines and temples had received subsidies for repairs and reconstruction Buildings that were repaired during this period include the five-storied pagoda of Daigo-ji, the kon-dō of Tōshōdai-ji and the hon-dō of Kiyomizu-dera. In a survey carried out under guidance of Okakura Kakuzō and Ernest Fenollosa from 1888 to 1897 all over Japan, about 210,000 objects of artistic or historic merit were evaluated and catalogued. The end of the 19th century saw a drastic change in political climate and cultural values: from an enthusiastic adoption of western values to a returned interest in the Japanese cultural heritage. Japanese architectural history appeared on curricula and the first books on architectural history were published, stimulated by the newly compiled inventories.

=== 1897 Ancient Temples and Shrines Preservation Law ===
On June 5, 1897, the government enacted the Ancient Temples and Shrines Preservation Law (古社寺保存法, koshaji hozonhō) (law number 49), which was the first systematic law for the preservation of Japanese historic art and architecture. This law was formulated under the guidance of the architectural historian and architect Itō Chūta and established in 20 articles a system of governmental financial support for the preservation of buildings and the restoration of artworks. It applied to works of architecture and related art of historic uniqueness and exceptional quality (art. 2). Applications for financial support were to be made to the Ministry of Internal Affairs (art. 1), and the responsibility for restoration or preservation lay in the hand of local officials (art. 3). Restoration works were financed directly from the national coffers (art. 8).

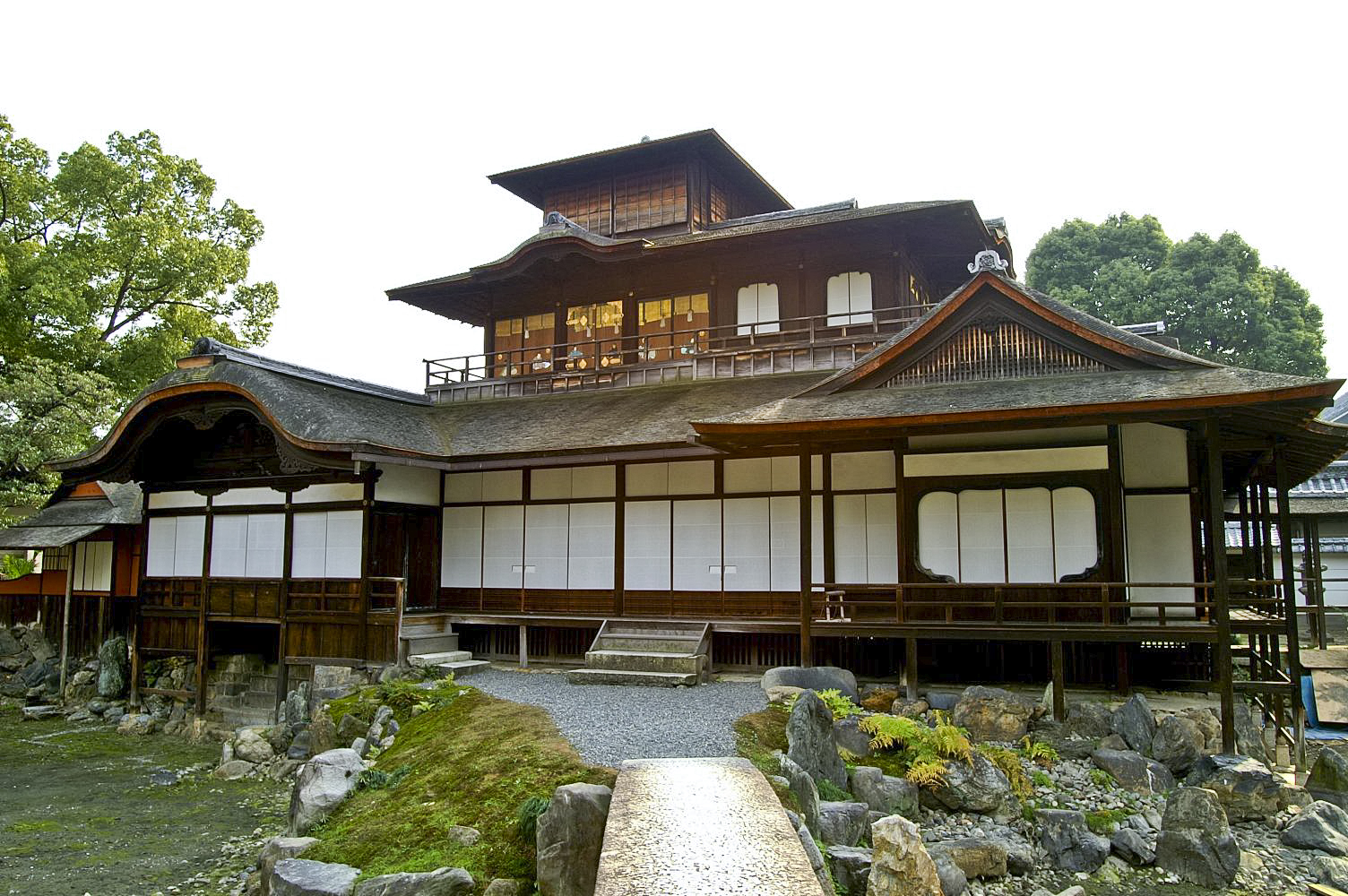
The Hiunkaku at Nishi Hongan-ji in Kyoto

This first law was followed by a second law on December 15, 1897 giving supplementary provisions for designating works of art in the possession of temples or shrines as "national treasure" (国宝, kokuhō); religious architecture could be designated as "specially protected buildings" (特別保護建造物, tokubetsu hogo kenzōbutsu). The main criteria for designation were "artistic superiority" and "value as historical evidence and wealth of historical associations", but also age was considered in the designation. Designated artworks could be from any of the following categories: painting, sculpture, calligraphy, books and handicrafts; subsequently swords were added. However the law was limited to items held by religious institutions, leaving privately owned articles unprotected. Funds for the restoration of certain works of art and structures were raised from 20,000 yen to 150,000 yen and fines were set for the destruction of cultural properties. Owners had to register designated objects with newly created museums, which were granted first option in case of sale. Initially, 44 temple and shrine buildings and 155 relics were thus designated, including the kon-dō at Hōryū-ji.

The laws of 1897 are the foundation for today's preservation law. At the time of their enactment only Britain, France, Greece and four other European nations had similar legislation in place. The restoration of Tōdai-ji's Daibutsuden from 1906 to 1913 was carried out under these laws. In 1914 the administration of cultural properties was transferred from the Ministry of Internal Affairs to the Ministry of Education (today's MEXT).

=== 1919 Historical Sites, Places of Scenic Beauty, and Natural Monuments Preservation Law ===
At the beginning of the 20th century, modernization transformed the landscape and posed a threat to historic and natural monuments. Societies of prominent men like the "Imperial Ancient Sites Survey Society" or the "Society for the Investigation and Preservation of Historic Sites and Aged Trees" lobbied and achieved a resolution in the House of Peers for conservation measures. Eventually, this led to the 1919 Historical Sites, Places of Scenic Beauty, and Natural Monuments Preservation Law (史蹟名勝天然紀念物保存法, shiseki meishō tennenkinenbutsu hozonhō), giving the same protection and cataloging to these properties as temples, shrines and pieces of art had received in 1897.

=== 1929 National Treasures Preservation Law ===
By 1929 about 1100 properties had been designated under the "Ancient Shrines and Temples Preservation Law" of 1897. Most of these were religious buildings erected from the 7th to the early 17th century. About 500 buildings had been extensively restored with 90% of costs paid from the national budget. Restorations during the Meiji period often employed new materials and techniques.

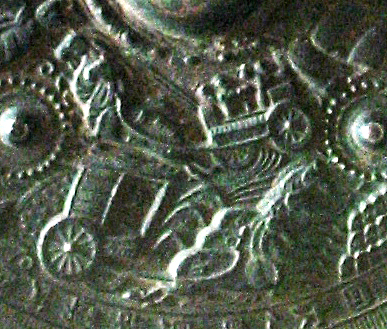
This bronze mirror is a Kofun period national treasure.

In 1929, the National Treasures Preservation Law (国宝保存法, kokuhō hozonhō) was passed and came into force on July 1 of the same year. This law replaced the laws from 1897, extending protection to all public and private institutions and private individuals in order to prevent the export or removal of cultural properties. The focus was extended from religious buildings to castles, teahouses, residences and more recent religious buildings. Many of these structures had been transferred from feudal to private owners following the Meiji restoration. Some of the first residential buildings designated would be the Yoshimura residence in Osaka (1937) and the Ogawa residence in Kyoto (1944). In addition, the designation national treasure was applied not only to objects of art but to historical buildings as well. The new law also required permissions for intended alterations of designated properties.

Starting with the restoration of Tōdai-ji's Nandaimon gate in 1930, the standards for preservation works were raised. An architect supervised the reconstruction works on-site and extensive restoration reports, including plans, results of surveys, historical sources and documentation of the work done, became the norm. During the 1930s about 70–75 percent of restoration costs came from the national budget, which increased even during the war.

=== 1933 Law Regarding the Preservation of Important Works of Fine Arts ===
In the early 1930s Japan suffered from the Great Depression. In order to prevent art objects that had not been designated from being exported due to the economic crisis, the Law Regarding the Preservation of Important Works of Fine Arts (重要美術品等ノ保存ニ関スル法律, jūyō bijutsuhin tōno hozon ni kan suru hōritsu) was passed on April 1, 1933. It provided for a simpler designation procedure and a temporary protection including export. Under this law, about 8000 objects were protected, including temples, shrines and residential buildings. By 1939, 8282 items in nine categories (painting, sculpture, architecture, documents, books, calligraphy, swords, crafts and archaeological resources) had been designated national treasures and were forbidden to be exported.

During World War II many of the designated buildings were camouflaged, and water tanks and fire walls installed for their protection. 206 designated buildings, including Hiroshima Castle, were destroyed from May to August 1945. The 9th century Buddhist text Tōdaiji Fujumonkō, designated as national treasure in 1938, was destroyed in 1945 by fire as a result of the war.

=== Present 1950 Law for the Protection of Cultural Properties ===
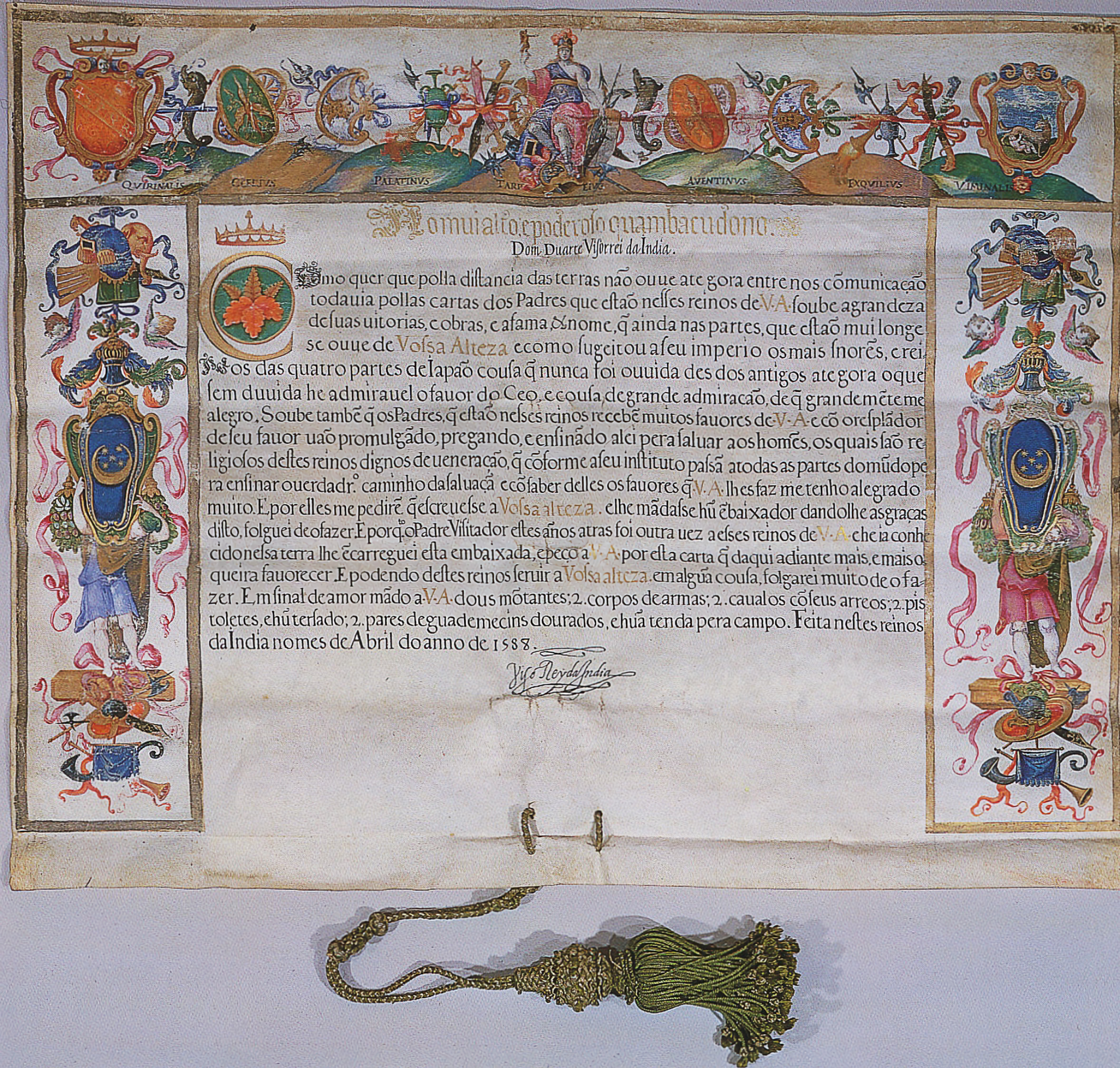
Letter from Duarte de Menezes, viceroy of Portuguese India, to daimyō Toyotomi Hideyoshi, a national treasure

On January 26, 1949, the kon-dō of Hōryū-ji, one of the oldest extant wooden buildings in the world and the first to be protected under the "Ancient Temples and Shrines Preservation Law", caught fire, resulting in the serious damage of valuable 7th century wall paintings. This incident accelerated the reorganisation of cultural property protection and gave rise to the Law for the Protection of Cultural Properties (文化財保護法, bunkazai hogohō) which was drafted on May 30, 1950 and came into force on August 29 of the same year. The new law combined the laws of 1919, 1929 and 1933, expanding their scope to cover also intangible cultural properties, such as performing and applied arts, folk cultural properties and buried cultural properties. Before the enactment of the law, only intangible cultural properties of especially high value at risk of extinction had been protected. Even by international standards, the 1950 law covered a broad spectrum of properties. The law was the basis for the establishment of the Committee for the Protection of Cultural Properties, a precursor of today's Agency for Cultural Affairs. It allowed the selection of the most important cultural properties, set restrictions on the alteration, repair and export of cultural properties and provided measures for the preservation and utilization of such properties.

The regulations implementing the law specified three broad categories of properties: tangible/intangible cultural properties and historic sites, places of scenic beauty, natural Monuments. tangible cultural properties were in this context defined as objects of "high artistic or historic value" or archaeological materials (or other historic material) of "high scholarly value". Designated buildings were required to be outstanding in design or building technique, have a high historic or scholarly value or be typical of a movement or area.

A two tier system for tangible cultural properties was established with the gradings: important cultural property and national treasure. The Minister of Education can designate important cultural properties as national treasures if they are of "particularly high value from the standpoint of world culture or outstanding treasures for the Japanese people". All previously designated national treasures were initially demoted to important cultural properties. Some of them have been again designated as national treasures since June 9, 1951. Following a decision by the National Diet, properties to be nominated as World Heritage Site are required to be protected under the 1950 law.

=== 1954 amendment ===
With the 1954 amendment, the three categories were reorganized into four: tangible cultural properties, intangible cultural properties, folk materials (split off from the former tangible cultural properties category), and monuments (new name for the former historic sites, places of scenic beauty, natural monuments" category). Buried cultural properties were introduced as a new category, separate from tangible cultural properties. In addition, a designation system was established for important intangible cultural properties and important tangible folk Properties.

=== 1966 Law for the Preservation of Ancient Capitals ===
Particularly in the 1960s, the spectrum of protected buildings was expanded to include early examples of western architecture. Around the same time, concepts for conserving the built environment were developed. With the Law for the Preservation of Ancient Capitals from 1966, the Prime Minister could designate Preservation Districts for Historic Landscapes" or Special Preservation Districts, where the former needed only notification in case of alterations, while the latter required approval. This law was restricted to the ancient capitals of Kamakura, Heijō-kyō (Nara), Heian-kyō (Kyoto), Asuka, Yamato (present day Asuka, Nara), Fujiwara-kyō (Kashihara), Tenri, Sakurai and Ikaruga, places with a large number of national treasures.

In 1968 the planning authority was decentralized and power transferred to local governments. The Agency for Cultural Affairs was formed as a merger of the Cultural Bureau of the Ministry of Education and the Cultural Properties Protection Commission. At the same time was established the Council for the Protection of Cultural Properties.

=== 1975 amendments: Preservation District for a Group of Historic Buildings and Techniques for the Conservation of Cultural Properties ===
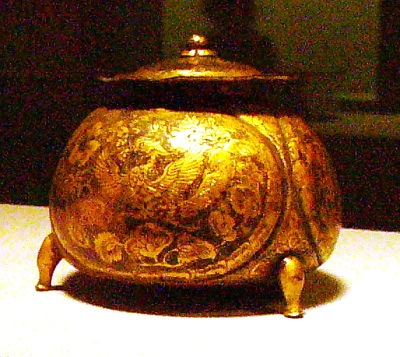
Bronze water container, formerly property of Hōryū-ji

The year 1975 saw two important extensions to the Law for the Protection of Cultural Properties. The Ancient Capital law was extended to include cities not formerly capitals and two new designations, preservation district for a group of historic buildings and important preservation district for a group of historic buildings, were created for especially important districts. As of January 16, 2010, there are 86 preservation districts, many of which are located in remote regions.

As a second major change of 1975, the government started to protect not only tangible or intangible cultural properties, but also techniques for the conservation of cultural properties. This step was made necessary by the disappearance of skilled craftsmen as a result of industrialization.

=== 1996 amendment: registered cultural properties ===
The two-tier system of national treasures and important cultural properties was supplemented with a new class of registered cultural properties meant for items in great need of preservation and use, initially limited to buildings and acting as a waiting list for the list of designated important cultural properties. A large number of mainly industrial and historic residential from the late Edo to the Shōwa period were registered under this system.

=== 1999 and 2004 amendments ===
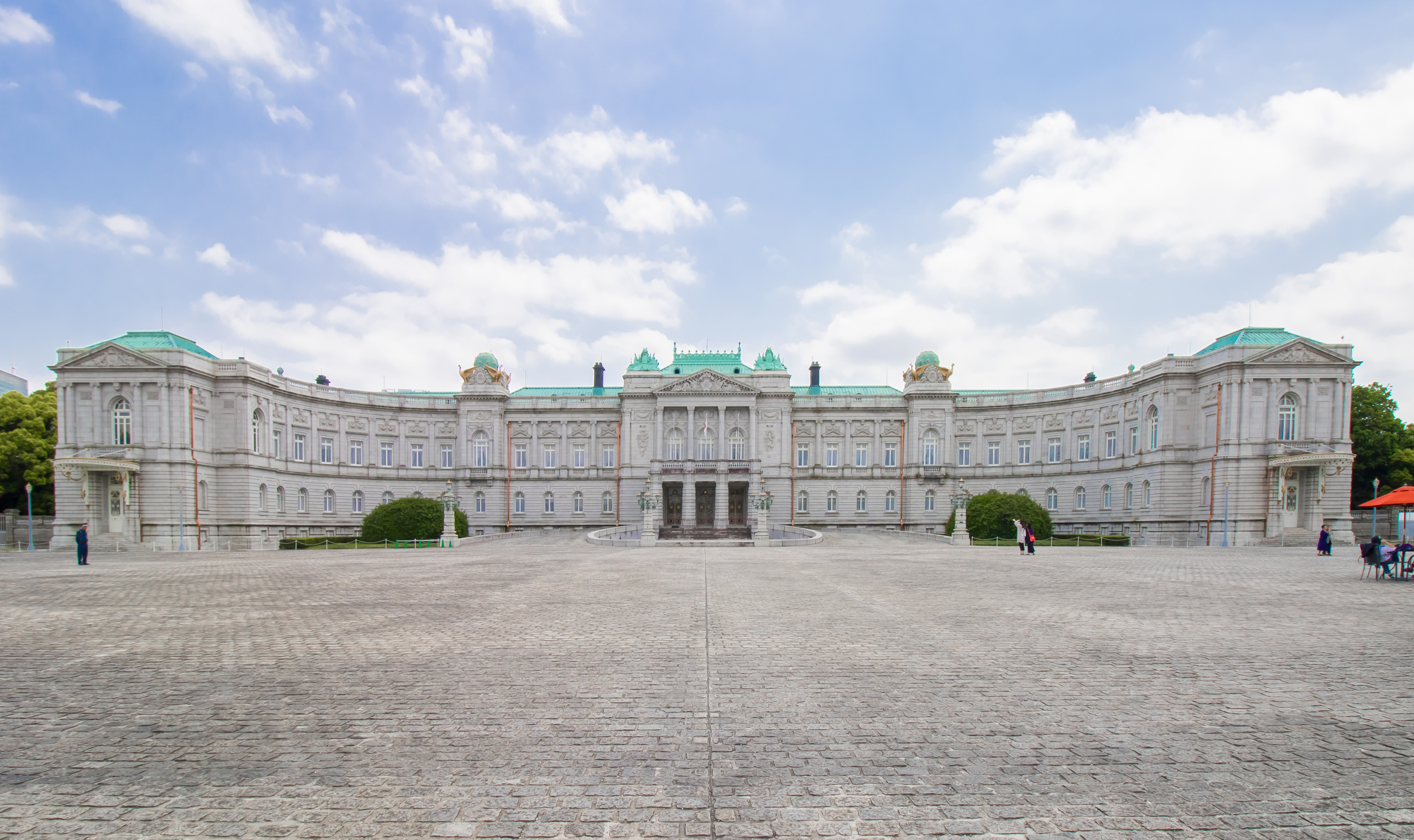
The Akasaka Palace is the only national treasure in the category of modern residences (Meiji period and later).

Since the end of the 20th century, the Agency for Cultural Affairs has been focusing on the designation of structures built between 1868 and 1930 or in underrepresented regions. The agency realized the insufficient supply of raw materials and tools necessary for restoration works. In 1999 the protective authority was transferred to prefectures and designated cities. With the 2004 amendment, a system for important cultural landscapes was established and folk Techniques were added to the definition of folk cultural properties. Registered cultural properties was extended to include works of fine arts and crafts, tangible cultural properties and tangible folk cultural properties.

=== 2021 amendment ===
With the 2021 amendment, the class of registered cultural properties was extended to include intangible cultural properties and intangible folk cultural properties.

== See also ==
- For lists of national treasures of Japan, see Lists of National Treasures of Japan.
- Historic Monuments of Ancient Kyoto (Kyoto, Uji and Otsu Cities)
- Philippine Registry of Cultural Property
- Tangible Cultural Property (Japan)
- List of Traditional Crafts of Japan
