= Modern kana usage =

Use of Japan's syllabic script in contemporary times

Modern kana usage (現代仮名遣い, gendai kanazukai) is the present official kanazukai (system of spelling the Japanese syllabary). Also known as new kana usage (新仮名遣い, shin kanazukai), it is derived from historical usage.

== History ==
As long ago as the Meiji Restoration, there had been dissatisfaction regarding the growing discrepancy between spelling and speech. On November 16, 1946, soon after World War II, the cabinet instituted the modern Japanese orthography as part of a general orthographic reform. The system was further amended in 1986.

== General differences ==
There were no small kana in the pre-reform system; thus, for example, きよ would be ambiguous between kiyo and kyo while かつた could be either katsuta or katta.

The pronunciation of medial h-row kana as w-row kana in the pre-reform system does not extend to compound words; thus, にほん was pronounced nihon, not nion (via **niwon). There are a small number of counterexamples; e.g., あひる "duck", pronounced ahiru rather than airu, or ふぢはら, pronounced Fujiwara, despite being a compound of Fuji (wisteria) + hara (field). The h-row was historically pronounced as fa, fi, fu, fe, fo (and even further back, pa, pi, pu, pe, po). Japanese f (IPA: [ɸ]) is close to a voiceless w, and so was easily changed to w in the middle of a word; the w was then dropped except for わ wa. This is also why fu is used to this day and has not become hu.

The vowel + (f)u changes do not apply between elements of compound words, for example, the name てらうち was Terauchi not Terōchi, as it is Tera (temple) + uchi (inside, home). The -fu of the modern -u series of verbs (that is, those verbs using the actual kana う, such as kau or omou) was not affected by the sound changes on the surface; however, some reports of Edo era Japanese indicate that verbs like tamau and harau were pronounced as tamō and harō instead. In contrast, the -ō in darō and ikō is a product of the sound change from au to ō.

Furthermore, the topic particle wa (は), the direction particle e (へ) and the direct object particle o (を) were exempted from spelling reform. In contemporary Japanese, the を-character is used only for the particle. Some innovative writers before the official reform went so far as to write the topic particle wa as わ. For example, the educator Ishikawa Kuraji wrote his innovatively space-separated and softly hyphenated hiragana text with わ instead of は and え instead of へ, although he still kept を.

== Examples ==
Here, for example, あ (a) includes all kana using the /a/ vowel, such as か (ka) or た (ta).

Spelling changes
Archaic	Modern	Notes
あ・わ＋う ((w)a + u) あ・わ＋ふ ((w)a + fu)	おう (ō)	Same conversion for k(w)a(f)u → kō, g(w)a(f)u → gō, sa(f)u → sō, sha(f)u → shō, ja(f)u → jō, etc.
い＋う (i + u) い＋ふ (i + fu)	ゆう (yū)	Same conversion for ki(f)u → kyū, shi(f)u → shū, ji(f)u → jū, chi(f)u → chū, etc.
う＋ふ (u + fu)	うう (ū)	Same conversion for ku(f)u → kū, su(f)u → sū, etc.
え＋う (e + u) え＋ふ (e + fu)	よう (yō)	Same conversion for ke(f)u → kyō, se(f)u → shō, ze(f)u/de(f)u → jō, te(f)u → chō, etc.
お＋ふ (o + fu)	おう (ō)	Same conversion for ko(f)u → kō, so(f)u → sō, etc.
お＋ほ (o + ho) お＋を (o + wo)	おお (ō)	Same conversion for ko(f)o → kō, so(f)o → sō, etc.
く＋わ (ku + wa)	か (ka); Originally kwa	
ぐ＋わ (gu + wa)	が (ga); Originally gwa	
medial or final は (ha)	わ (wa)	
medial or final ひ (hi), へ (he), ほ (ho)	い (i), え (e), お (o) (via wi, we, wo, see below)	
any ゐ (wi), ゑ (we), を (wo)	い (i), え (e), お (o)	
ぢ (voiced chi), づ (voiced tsu)	じ (voiced shi), ず (voiced su) – see yotsugana	

Regarding じぢずづ – these four morae are distinguished or merged to varying degrees in different Japanese dialects, with some dialects (Tōhoku and Okinawan, for example) merging all four into one, while other dialects (Tosa and Satsugū, for example) distinguish among the four. Standard spelling reflects the pronunciation of standard Japanese, which merges these into two sounds.

== See also ==
- Yotsugana
