= Kanazukai =

Orthographic rules for spelling

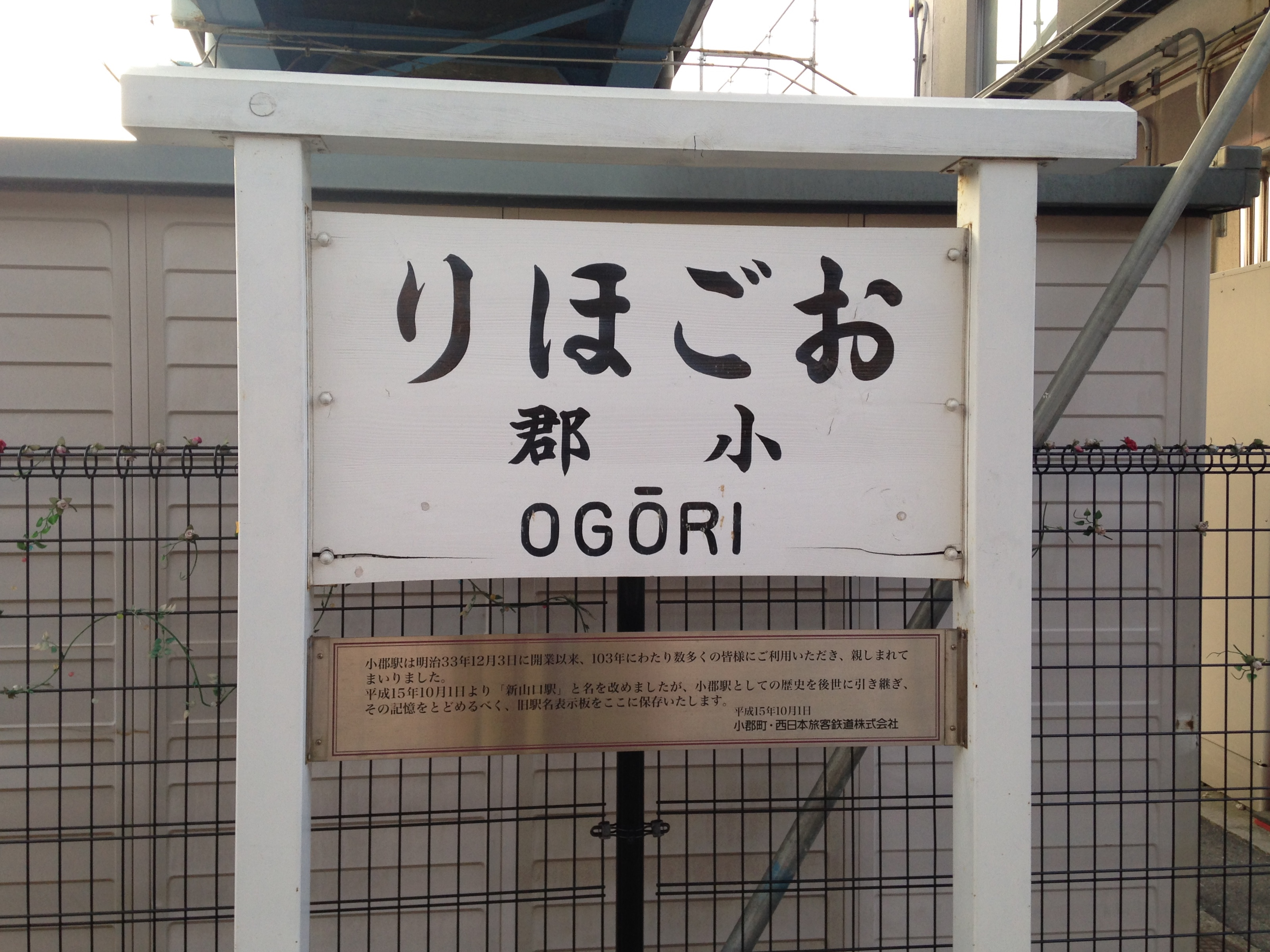
Former station name display board at Shin-Yamaguchi Station. While Ogōri is written as 'wogohori' in historical kana orthography, it is rendered as 'ogohori' on the station sign.

Kanazukai (仮(か)名(な)遣(づか)い, ‘kana usage’) are the orthographic rules for spelling Japanese in kana. All phonographic systems (of which kana is an example) attempt to account accurately the pronunciation in their spellings. However, pronunciation and accents change over time and phonemic distinctions are often lost. Various systems of kanazukai were introduced to deal with the disparity between the written and spoken versions of Japanese.

== Historical systems ==
The former mainstream kana usage, or the Kyū-Kanazukai (旧(きゅう)仮(か)名(な)遣(づかい), ‘old kana usage’), is based on classical texts, especially man'yōgana. Created by Keichū in the early Edo period, it is also known as the Keichū Kanazukai. It was the mainstream kanazukai until the Gendai Kanazukai was introduced in 1946.

There were other minor systems throughout history that are now defunct:

- Jōdai Tokushu Kanazukai (Japanese: 上代特殊仮名遣い): a modified Man'yōgana where /e, je/ are distinct.
- Teika Kanazukai (Japanese: 定家仮名遣い): created by Fujiwara no Teika, it distinguishes between /wo, o/, /i, hi, wi/, /e, we, he/, and also (to a lesser degree) /e, je/. /wo, o/ were used to express high and low accent, respectively.
- Gyōa Kanazukai (Japanese: 行阿仮名遣い), also known as Kanamojizukai (Japanese: 仮名文字遣い): created by Minamoto no Chikayuki and his grandson Gyōa, which expanded on the Teika Kanazukai by distinguishing between /ho/, /wa, ha/, /u, hu/, and /mu/. /wo, o/ are still used to distinguish between high and low accent. However, the distinction between /e, je/ is obliterated.

== Gendai Kanazukai ==
Derived from the Kyū-Kanazukai, gendai kanazukai is a revision to more approximate modern pronunciation that is still used currently. As an adaption of the Kyū-Kanazukai, it is still not entirely phonetic, especially in respect to long vowels and particles.

== See also ==
- Yotsugana
