= Genbun itchi =

Unification of the written and spoken forms of Japanese language

Genbun itchi (Japanese: 言文一致, literally meaning "unification of the spoken and written language") was a successful nineteenth- and early-twentieth century movement in Japan to replace classical Japanese, the written standard of the Japanese language, and classical Chinese with vernacular Japanese. At the start of the Meiji period, much writing in Japan was done in Chinese, called kanbun, or in the older form of the Japanese language called classical Japanese. Classical Japanese began to be written during the Heian period, at which point it was very similar to spoken Japanese. It became the written standard for the Japanese language for many centuries, though the spoken language continued to evolve and by the Edo period was substantially different from classical Japanese.

During the early nineteenth century some authors began to write in colloquial Japanese to reach a broader audience who were unable to understand classical Japanese. The first formal proposal to reform the written language was a petition composed in 1866 by Maejima Hisoka. Following the Meiji Restoration, a movement started to phase out kanbun and classical Japanese as a means to improve education and literacy. The name for the movement, genbun itchi, was coined by Kanda Takahira in 1885.

Futabatei Shimei's 1887 novel The Drifting Cloud was one of the first novels to be written in vernacular Japanese rather than classical. However, the intellectual community was divided, with some arguing that the grammar and vocabulary of spoken Japanese was too unrefined for use in literature. The movement died out between 1890 and 1895, during which no works of literature were written in vernacular Japanese.

Several years later the movement was revitalized, with Natsume Sōseki playing a key role in developing a new gembun itchi literary style. In 1900, the Japanese government appointed Maejima Hisoka as chair of the Genbun Itchi Committee to study the issue. The committee recommended increasing the use of colloquial Japanese. By 1908, novels no longer used classical Japanese or kanbun, and by the 1920s the same was true of all newspapers. Government documents remained in classical Japanese until 1946.

== See also ==
- Written vernacular Chinese
