= Tōdaiji Fujumonkō =

Tōdaiji Fujumonkō (東大寺諷誦文稿; "Tōdai Temple Buddhist Prays Manuscript") is an early ninth century Buddhist text. It is best known as a valuable resource for Japanese historical linguistics as well as Buddhist history.

== Manuscript ==
Tōdaiji Fujumonkō was composed sometime between 796 and 830. It was written on the reverse side of Kegon Mongi Yōketsu (華厳文義要決) and is one volume in length. The compiler is unknown but speculated to have been a priest belonging to the Dharma character school due to the large usage of related vocabulary. The original manuscript did not contain a title, but one was later added.

In 1939, the manuscript owner Satō Tatsujirō (佐藤達次郎) published a two-volume collotype facsimile reproduction, one for the front and the other for the back. The original manuscript was designated as a National Treasure of Japan on July 4, 1938, but removed due to its destruction on April 14, 1945, in the fires resulting from the war. Only facsimiles remain.

== Contents ==
The text is 396 lines in length. It is primarily a collection of prayers recorded at Buddhist memorial services.

== Linguistics ==
Tōdaiji Fujumonkō is primarily important as a resource for early Early Middle Japanese. It is the oldest example of text written in kanji with katakana annotations. In addition, it exhibits many elements of Old Japanese grammar and vocabulary and maintains the phonetic distinction between /ko_{1}/ and /ko_{2}/. It also contains accounts in several dialects.
