= Yotsugana =

Four kana in Japanese that are pronounced the same in some regions

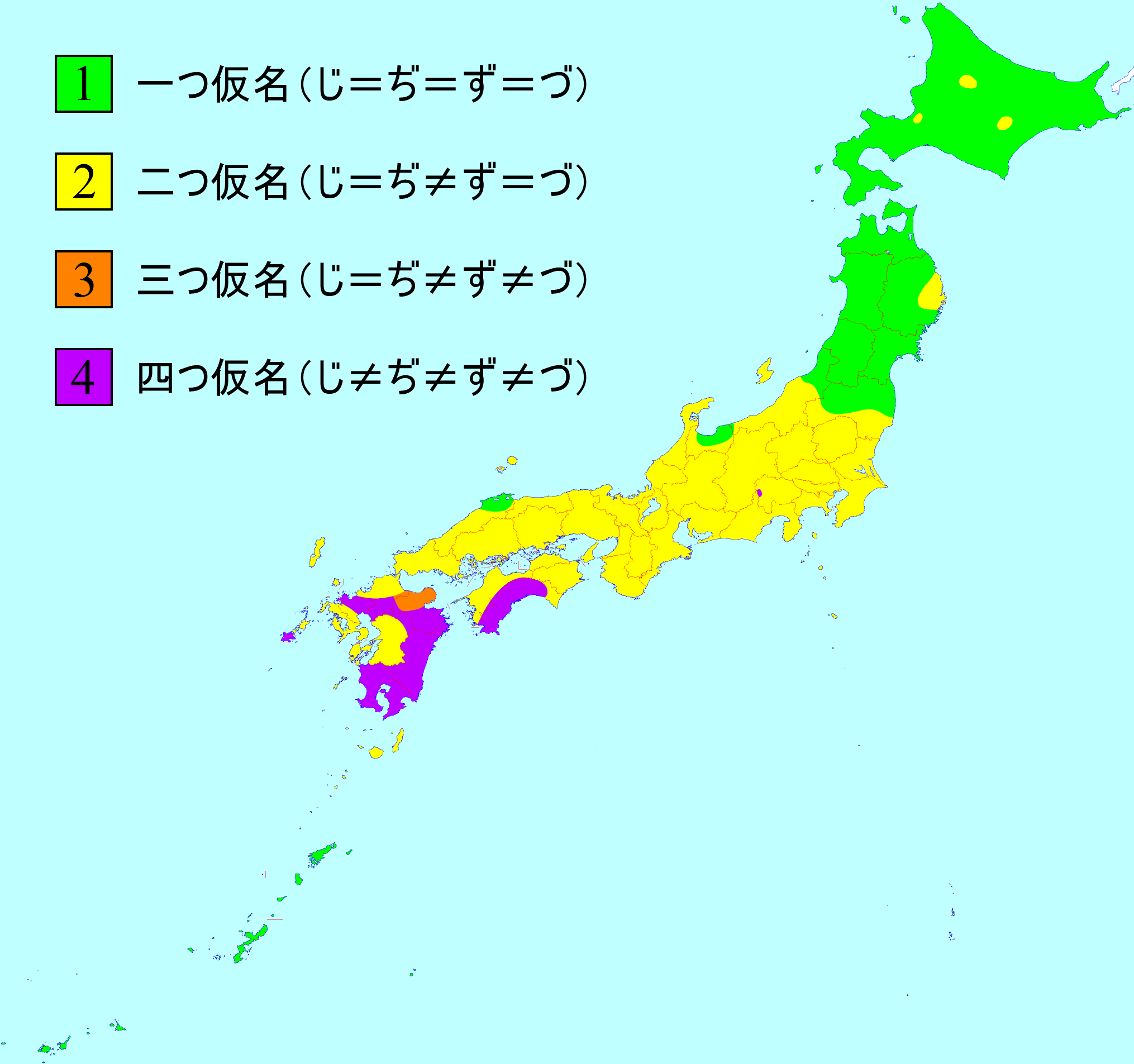
Different regions distinguish different sets of sounds. Using Nihon-shiki romanization: 1 sound (zi = di = zu = du) 2 sounds (zi = di ≠ zu = du) 3 sounds (zi = di ≠ zu ≠ du) 4 sounds (zi ≠ di ≠ zu ≠ du)

Yotsugana (四つ仮名; literally "four kana") are a set of four specific kana, じ, ぢ, ず, づ (in the Nihon-shiki romanization system: zi, di, zu, du), used in the Japanese writing system. They historically represented four distinct voiced morae (syllables) in the Japanese language. However, most dialects, such as Standard Japanese-speakers, have undergone mergers and now pronounce two sounds.

== Modern sound usage in various dialects ==
Most of the far northern dialects (Tōhoku dialects and Hokkaidō) and far southern dialects (notably Okinawan Japanese) and the Ryukyuan languages (the other Japonic languages) have also mostly merged the four sounds to one sound. However, a few dialects, mainly around Shikoku and Kyushu in the southwest, still distinguish three or even all four sounds.

In the current Tokyo dialect, the base of the modern standard language, as well as in the widely spoken Kansai dialect, only two sounds are distinguished, as is represented in the Hepburn (ji, ji, zu, zu) and Kunrei (zi, zi, zu, zu) romanization systems.

== Modern kana usage ==
The spelling differences between the four kana were retained well into the mid-20th century, long after the merger of the different sounds that they had represented. Two distinct morae remain in most dialects of the mainland, such as in Tokyo.

Shortly after World War II ended, the discrepancy between kana orthography and pronunciation was rectified as part of a general orthographic reform, the Gendai Kanazukai, or modern kana orthography. Under the new orthographic rules, only the two kana じ (zi/ji) and ず (zu) are to be used, with two notable exceptions:

1. When a word exhibits sequential voicing, or rendaku, as a result of compounding, a second morpheme that would otherwise begin with the kana つ tu or ち ti in isolation (神無月 かんなづき kannaduki/kannazuki for which 月 in isolation is written つき tuki/tsuki).
2. When the kana つ tu/tsu or ち ti/chi is repeated and voiced in a word (続く つづく tuduku/tsuzuku).

An exception was permitted for regions that pronounced the four kana as three or four distinct sounds. After a 1986 update to the Gendai Kanazukai, the exception was replaced with a statement that the unified spelling was to be primarily used, but etymologically-correct spellings would still be permitted.

== Modern regional variants ==
The following table shows some of the differentiations among yotsugana characters expressed in regional dialects across Japan:

Variants	ぢ di	じ zi	づ du	ず zu
Standard Japanese	[d͡ʑi] ~ [ʑi]		[d͡zɯᵝ] ~ [zɯᵝ]	
North Tohoku, Izumo	[d͡ʑi]			
South Tohoku	[d͡zɯᵝ]			
Kōchi (Hata, Tosa)	[di] ~ [dᶻi]	[ʑi]	[dɯᵝ] ~ [dᶻɯᵝ]	[zɯᵝ]
Kagoshima	[d͡ʑi]	[ʑi]	[d͡zɯᵝ]	[zɯᵝ]
Okinawa	[d͡ʑi]			
