= Tosa dialect =

Japanese Shikoku dialect

- 土佐弁
- Native to: Japan
- Region: Kōchi, Shikoku
- Language family: Japonic: Japanese; Western Japanese; Shikoku; Tosa dialect

Language codes
- ISO 639-3: –
- Linguist List: jpn-koc
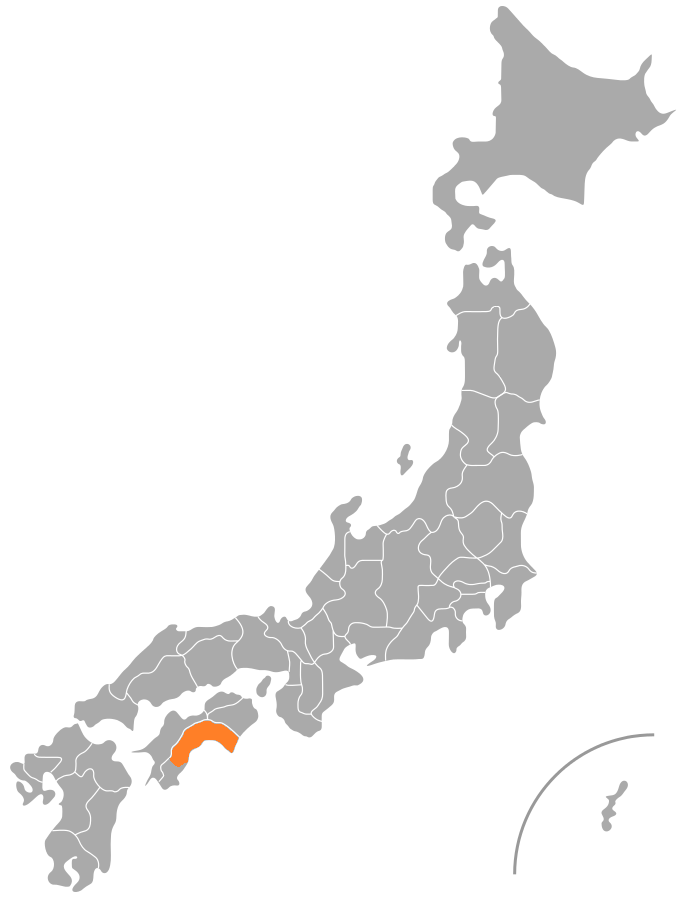
- Tosa dialect area.

The Tosa dialect (Japanese: 土佐弁 tosa-ben) is a dialect of Japanese spoken across most of Kochi Prefecture, on the island of Shikoku.

== Classification ==
Shikoku dialects are divided into Western (Tokushima, Kagawa and Ehime), Southern (Kochi), and also occasionally Southwest (western Kochi and southern Ehime). The Tosa dialect exists in a somewhat unique position due to being historically isolated from other prefectures because of the Shikoku Mountains.

Kochi Prefecture dialects are broadly divided into Western and Eastern-Central.

- Western dialect - Shimanto (city), Tosashimizu, Sukumo, Otsuki, Mihara, Kuroshio (excluding the former town of Saga), Shimanto (town) (excluding the former town of Kubokawa), Yusuhara. Possesses a Tokyo standard pitch accent. Known as the 'Hata dialect’.
- Eastern-Central dialect - All other areas in Kochi. Possesses a Keihan standard, or Tarui standard pitch accent. Known as the 'Tosa dialect’, and will be described in this article.

The coastal region from Muroto to Toyo has been influenced by the Tokushima Awa dialect and the Kinki dialects.

== Phonology ==
The most notable phonetic traits of the Tosa dialect are as follows:

- Virtually no silent vowels.
- The diphthong ei is distinctly retained. For example: pronunciation of keisan (計算 calculation) in the Tosa dialect is keisan (ケイサン), as opposed to keesan (ケーサン) in standard Japanese and Kansai dialects.
- Among older speakers, a nasalised sound (n) is inserted before g and d. Example: kagami (鏡 mirror) → kangami.
- Older speakers also differentiate between ji (じ) and di (ぢ) and zu (ず) and du (づ) (so-called yotsugana). Ji is pronounced [ʒi] whilst di is pronounced [dʒi], zu is pronounced [zu] whilst dzu is pronounced [dzu]. In addition, tsu is sometimes pronounced tu.
- Shi (し) sometimes becomes i (い) (i-euphony). For example: doshita (どうした) → doita (どういた), soshite (そして) → soite (そいて) and ashita (あした) → aita (あいた).
- In other Shikoku dialects and in the Kinki dialects, single-mora words tend to become lengthened like in te (手) → tee (てー) or chi (血) → chii (ちー), but this tendency is weaker in the Tosa dialect. Only third-class nouns such as ki (木) and te (手) are sometimes lengthened. However, mainly among the younger generation, increased interaction with other Shikoku dialects and the Kinki dialects through media has resulted in a continuing trend of lengthening all single-mora words.
- Aside from northern Kochi, which has a Tarui standard pitch accent, a traditional Kyoto standard pitch accent is retained, much like in coastal Tokushima, in the city of Tanabe in Wakayama and in the central Kinki Region.

== Grammar and Expressions ==
=== Grammatical Aspects ===
The Tosa dialect, like English, differentiates between perfect and progressive tenses. Perfect tense uses the Renyōkei (連用形 conjunctive) form + chuu, choru, and chou, (ちゅー・ちょる・ちょう) and progressive tense uses the Renyōkei (連用形 conjunctive) form + yuu, yoru, and you (ゆー・よる・よう).

For example, the question 「宿題やった?」(shukudai yatta? Did you do your homework?) can be answered in the following ways without the use of adverbs.

- Present progressive aspect:

(Tosa Dialect) 「やりゆうき」(yariyūki)

(Standard Japanese) 「（今）やっているよ」( (ima) yatteiruyo)

(I’m doing it now!)

- Present perfect aspect:

(Tosa Dialect) 「やっちゅうき」(yacchūki)

(Standard Japanese) 「（もう）済ませているよ」( (mou) sumaseteiruyo)

(I’ve already finished it!)

In the case of 「（し）よった」( (shi) yotta I was (doing) it) it is the past progressive aspect and for 「（し）ちょった」( (shi) chotta I had (done) it) the past perfect aspect. The specification of perfect aspects is one of the characteristics of the dialects of western Japan.

With verbs such as 「死ぬ」(shinu to die) or 「消える」(kieru to disappear/ go out) where the change is instantaneous, the progressive aspect like 「死にゆう」(shiniyū) and 「消えゆう」(kieyū) is used to express the sense of “...is about to...”. In the progressive aspect, the existential verb「ある」(aru to be) expresses a specific duration of time.

=== Orders, Requests, and Prohibitives ===
Orders can be given using the Renyōkei (連用形 conjunctive) form of verbs, which makes for a gentler expression than using the Meireikei (命令形 imperative) form. 「や」(ya) is often used, such as in 「行きや」(ikiya go) and 「見（ー）や」(mi(i)ya look). 「-ておーせ・とーせ・とーぜ」(-teōse, tōse, and tōze) are used with subsidiary verbs like the formal「…してください」(shitekudasai please do).

In cases such as「行かれん」（ikaren) which in standard Japanese is（行くな）(ikuna don’t go) and 「見られん」(miraren) which means the same as（見るな）(miruna don’t look) in standard Japanese, the Mizenkei (未然形 nai stem) form of a verb plus 「れん・られん」(ren or raren) is used to indicate prohibition. This expression is also present in the Awa dialect and the Iyo dialect.

(Tosa dialect) 「いかんちや、せられん」(ikanchiya, seraren)

(Standard Japanese) 「ダメだよ、やっちゃダメ」(damedayo, yacchadame)

(stop, don’t do that)

Additionally, the Renyōkei (連用形 conjunctive) form of a verb can be used to express prohibition, such as in「行きな」(ikina don’t go) and 「見な」(mina don’t look). This is also present in the Kansai dialect.

=== Conjecture ===
Expressions like「はれるろー」(harerurō)（晴れるだろう）(harerudarou it will be sunny) and 「たかいろー」(takairō)（高いだろう）(takaidarou it will be expensive) are composed of the Shūshikei (終止形 dictionary) form of a conjugated word + 「ろー」(rō) and are used to express conjecture.「ろー」(rō) originated as 「らむ」(ramu). Additionally, expressions like 「あっつろー」(atsurō) or（あっただろう）(attadarō would have had) in Standard Japanese and「たかかっつろー」(takakattsurō) or（高かっただろう）(takattadarō would have been expensive) in Standard Japanese use the Renyōkei (連用形 conjunctive) form of a conjugated word + 「つろー」(tsurō) and express conjecture in the perfect tense.

「-にかーらん」(-nikāran) correlates to 「-らしい」(-rashii it seems...). It can also be used to express the comparison phrase “it’s like…” (「まるで…のようだ」marude…noyōda).

(Tosa Dialect)「あの店はラーメン屋に変わったにかあらん」(ano mise wa ramenya ni kawattanikāran)

(Standard Japanese) 「あの店はラーメン屋に変わったらしい」(ano mise wa ramenya ni kawattarashii)

(I heard that restaurant got converted into a ramen shop)

※This also includes the nuance of “no mistaking it” (-に違いない -ni chigainai).

== See also ==
- Yotsugana
