= Nairiku dialect =

Japanese dialect spoken in eastern Yamagata Prefecture

- 内陸方言
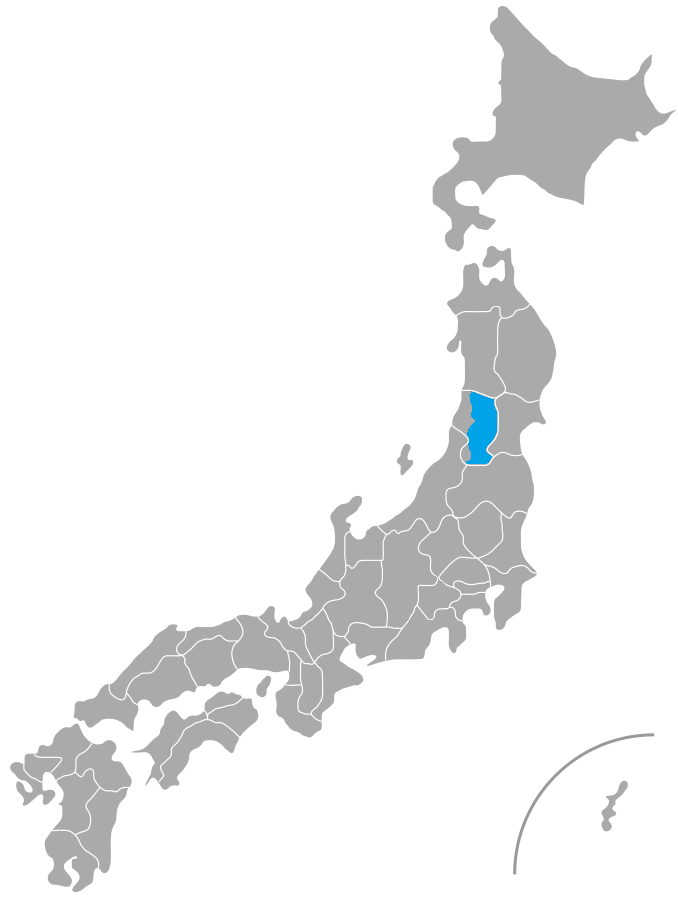
- Nairiku dialect area.
- Native to: Japan
- Region: Eastern Yamagata Prefecture
- Language family: Japonic: Japanese; Eastern Japanese; Tōhoku; Southern; Nairiku dialect
- Dialects: ◇ Mogami; ◇ Murayama; ◇ Okitama

Language codes
- ISO 639-3: –
- Glottolog: moga1249

The Nairiku dialect (Japanese: 内陸方言 nairiku hogen) is a Japanese dialect spoken in the eastern half of Yamagata Prefecture. It belongs to the Southern Tohoku dialect group.

== Sub-divisions ==
Yamagata Prefecture dialects are broadly divided into the Shonai and Nairiku branches. Although both are Tohoku dialects, the Shonai variety belongs to the Northern Tohoku dialect group, which possesses distinct differences to the Southern Tohoku dialect group to which the Nairiku dialect belongs. Whilst the Shonai dialect is found in the west of the prefecture, the Nairiku dialect occupies the inland east (nairiku hogen literally translates to inland dialect). The Nairiku dialect can be further divided into the Mogami (Shinjo) dialect of the Mogami Region, the Murayama dialect of the Murayama Region and the Okitama dialect of the Okitama Region (see below).

◆ Nairiku dialect (Southern Tohoku dialect branch)

- Mogami dialect (最上方言 Mogami hogen)
  - ▷ Mogami town dialect
- Murayama dialect (村山方言 Murayama hogen)
  - ▷ Kasumi town dialect† (香澄町弁 Kasumi-cho-ben)
- Okitama dialect (置賜方言 Okitama hogen)

The cause of the differences between these four areas is thought to be geographical separation and the prior existence of independent domains in the Early Modern Period. Of these regions, the Mogami dialect most notably has influences from the Shonai and Akita dialects. Despite this, within the Mogami Region, the town of Mogami historically had little interaction with the Shinjo area, and compounded by its closer connection to the Murayama Region, it forms an irregular dialect division. Additionally, in the town of Kasumi, Yamagata, the unique so-called ‘Kasumi town dialect’ (香澄町弁 kasumi-cho-ben) was formerly used.

== Grammar ==
=== Inflection ===
Na-adjectives

From Shounai to northern Mogami, the attributive form of na-adjectives is -da (-だ), making it the same as the plain form. This is a phenomenon that is widely seen in Northern Tohoku dialects. From southwest Mogami to Murayama and Okitama, it is the same as standard Japanese (-na (-な)).

Hypothetical form

For the hypothetical form, in addition to the same form as standard Japanese (e.g. kakeba (書けば if I write)), the forms -taraba (-たらば), -tareba ( -たれば), -gontara(ba) (-ごんたら(ば)) and -gottara (-ごったら) are also used. For the hypothetical form of i-adjectives, -keba (-けば) (kereba (-ければ)) as well as -tara (-たら), -kondara (-こんだら) and -kottara (-こったら) are used. For the hypothetical form the copula -da (-だ), -dara (-だら) and -dagontara (-だごんたら) are used.
