= Kesen dialect =

Japanese dialect of Iwate Prefecture, Japan

Kesen
- kesengo / ケセン語
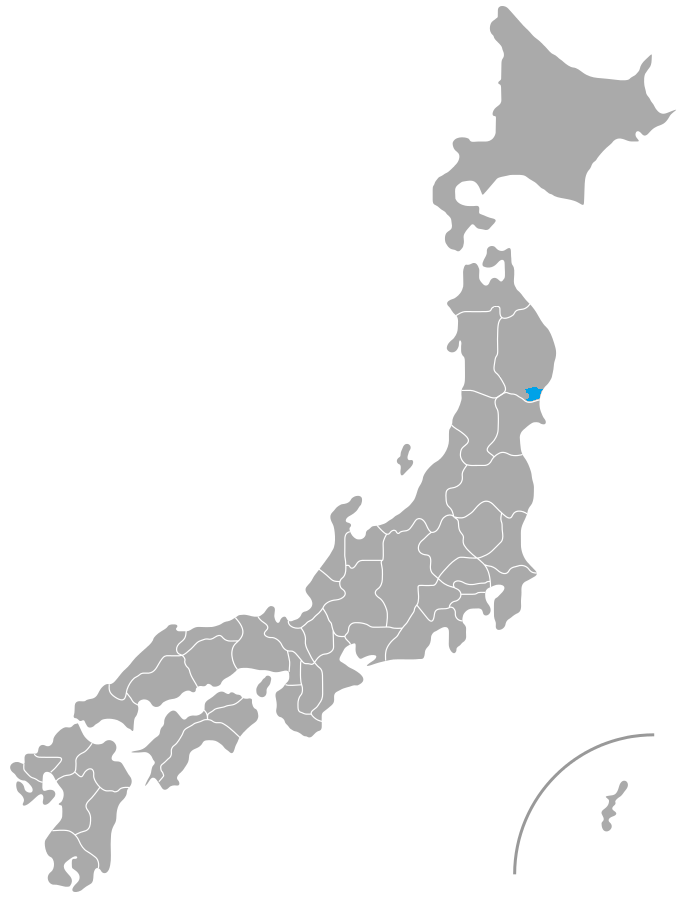
- Kesen dialect area.
- Native to: Japan
- Region: Iwate Prefecture: Ōfunato, Rikuzentakata, and Sumita.
- Language family: Japonic: Japanese; Eastern Japanese; Tōhoku; Southern; Southern Iwate dialect; Kesen

Language codes
- ISO 639-3: –
- Glottolog: kese1237
- IETF: ja-u-sd-jp03

Kesen dialect (気仙方言, Kesen hōgen) or Kesen (ケセン語, Kesengo; Kesengo) is a Japanese dialect spoken in Kesen County, Iwate Prefecture, Japan.

Kesen has been described by Harutsugu Yamaura (山浦玄嗣, Yamaura Harutsugu). Yamaura considers Kesen an independent language, related to both Japanese and Ainu languages, but this is not accepted by other linguists.

== Kesen ==
Kesen is spoken in the Kesen district of Iwate Prefecture, in the Tōhoku region of eastern Japan. Kesen dialect has been described as a variety of the Tōhoku dialect. The status of Kesen as an independent language, rather than a dialect of Japanese, is disputed. Harutsugu Yamaura, who developed a writing system for Kesen in 1986 (see below), has argued that the form is a language.

== Harutsugu Yamaura ==
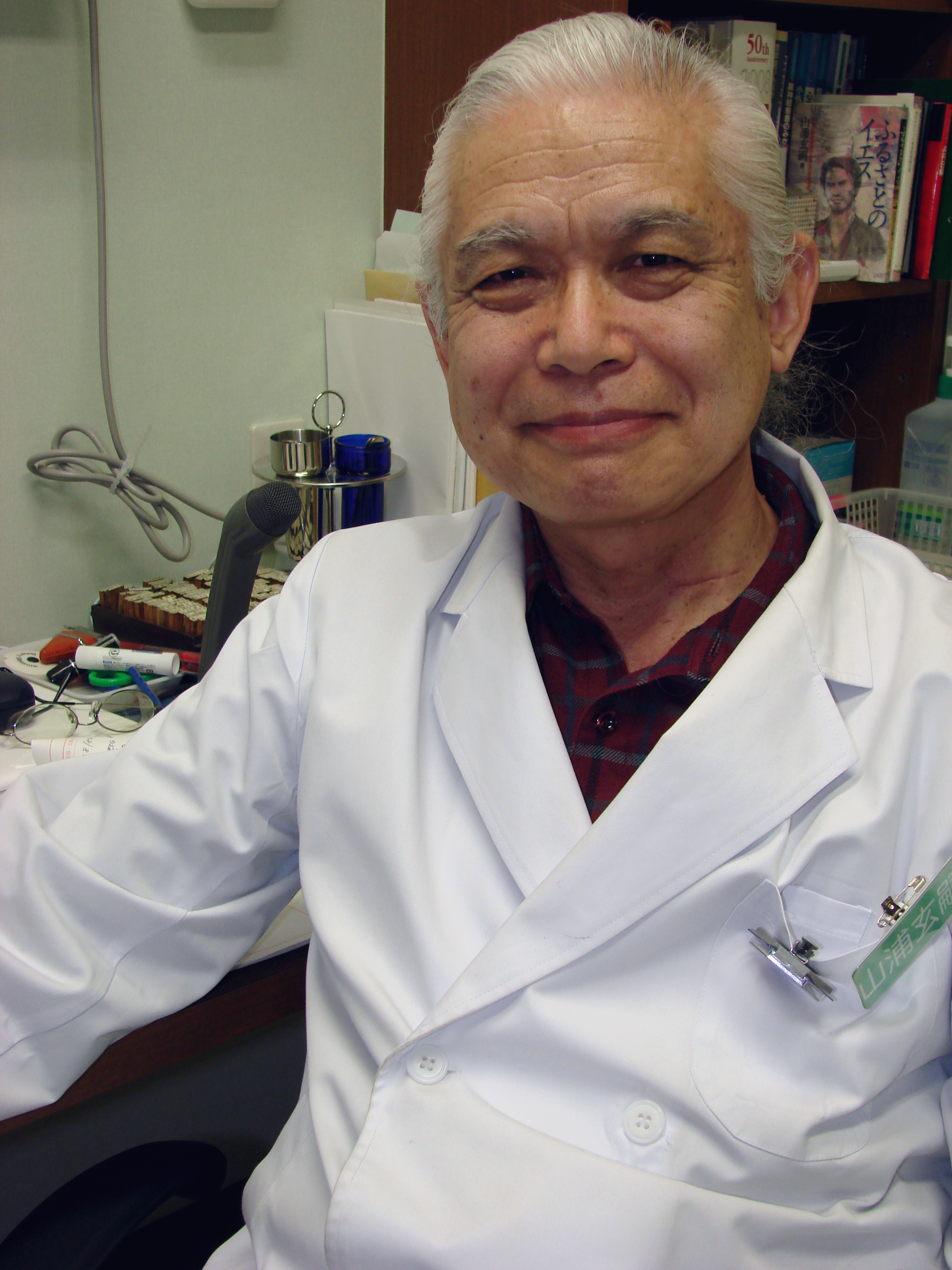
Harutsugu Yamaura

Iwate language activist and medical doctor Harutsugu Yamaura described the dialect in various books, including a dictionary, a grammar, and a translation of the New Testament. Yamaura also created an orthography for Kesen using two writing systems, the first based on the Latin script, and the second using Japanese orthography. Yamaura has forwarded the theory Kesen should not be considered a Japanese dialect, but an independent language in its own right with an Ainu substrate, a theory that is controversial.

According to Yamaura, Kesen was strongly influenced by the Emishi language. The word Kesen, for instance, comes from the Ainu term kese moy (cove at the south tip) and kese ma (scraped place). Yamaura considered the conventional Japanese kanji for Kesen (気仙) an ateji imposed by Yamato Kingdom. Therefore, he used katakana, a writing system typically used for foreign words, to spell the name (ケセン).

Yamaura's effort to describe Kesen and restore people's pride in their local speech is an example of countrywide effort where the national education system has resulted in the stigmatization of local dialects, which children were historically forbidden to use. However, such efforts are routinely depicted in the Japanese media as "romantic, bizarre or quaint" and not taken seriously. Yamaura's work has been recommended by Japanese linguists as a model to be followed for other dialects.
