= Tōhoku dialect =

Group of Japanese dialects spoken in Tōhoku, Japan

Tōhoku Japanese
- Native to: Japan
- Region: Tōhoku
- Language family: Japonic: Japanese; Eastern Japanese; Tōhoku Japanese

Language codes
- ISO 639-3: –
- Glottolog: toho1244
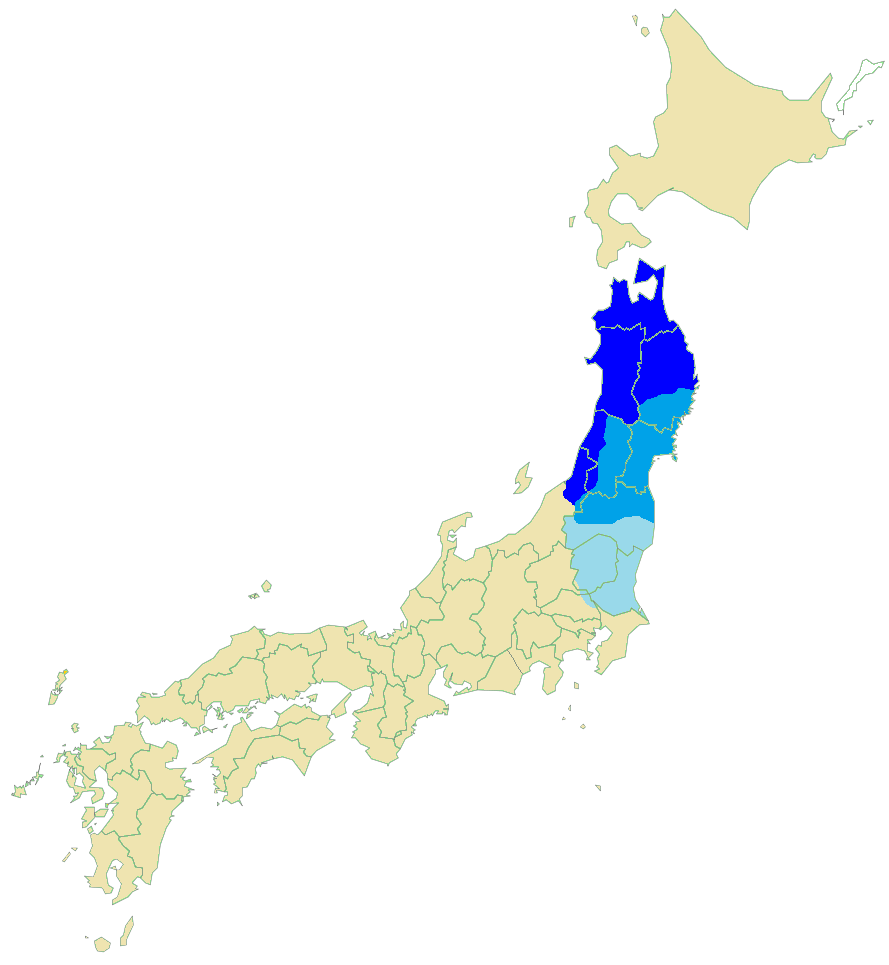
- Northern Tōhoku dialects (navy), Southern Tōhoku (med. blue), and the transitional Eastern Kantō dialects (azure)

The Tōhoku dialect (東北方言, Tōhoku hōgen), commonly called Tōhoku-ben (東北弁), is a group of the Japanese dialects spoken in the Tōhoku region, the northeastern region of Honshū. Toward the northern part of Honshū, the Tōhoku dialect can differ so dramatically from standard Japanese that it is sometimes rendered with subtitles for intelligibility in the nationwide media and it has been treated as the typical rural dialect in Japanese popular culture.

== Phonetics ==
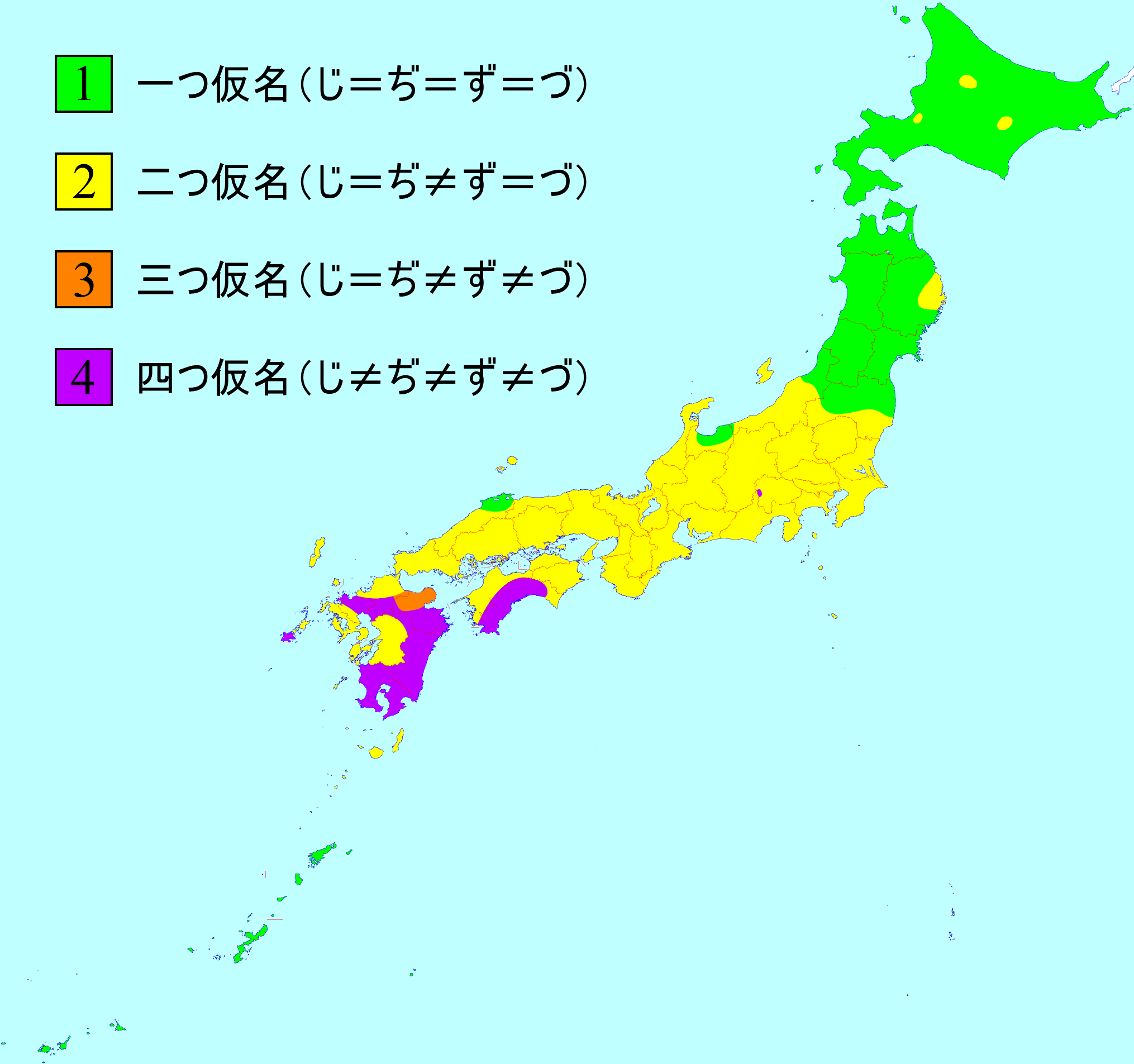
Chart of yotsugana pronunciation. The green zone including most of Tōhoku region means that the four yotsugana sounds have completely merged, as zi = di = zu = du.

A notable linguistic feature of the Tōhoku dialect is its neutralization of the high vowels "i" and "u" (Standard [i] and [ɯᵝ]) after coronal obstruents, so that the words sushi, susu ('soot'), and shishi ('lion') are rendered homophonous, where they would have been distinct in other dialects. In light of this, Tōhoku dialect is sometimes referred to as Zūzū-ben. The vowels tend to be neutralized to [ɨ] in Northern Tōhoku dialect and [ɯ̈] in Southern Tōhoku dialect.

In addition, all unvoiced stops become voiced intervocalically, rendering the pronunciation of the word kato ('trained rabbit') as [kado]. However, unlike the high-vowel neutralization, this does not result in new homophones, as all voiced stops are prenasalized, meaning that the word kado ('corner') is pronounced [kaⁿdo]. This is particularly noticeable with /ɡ/, which is nasalized fully to [ŋ] with the stop of the hard "g" [ᵑɡ] almost entirely lost, so that ichigo ('strawberry') is pronounced [ɨd͡ʑɨŋo]. Standard Japanese can do this with /ɡ/ too (see Japanese phonology), but not with the other stops. This distribution of medial voicing and prenasalization is thought to be a conservative pronunciation reflecting the original Old Japanese state.

Consonants of the Tōhoku dialect
| | Labial | Alveolar | Palatal | Velar | Uvular | Glottal |
|---|---|---|---|---|---|---|
| Nasals | m | n | | ŋ | ɴ | |
| Stops | p b | t d | | k ɡ | | |
| Fricatives | ɸ | s z | ɕ | | | h |
| Affricates | | ts | tɕ dʑ | | | |
| Liquids | | ɾ | | | | |
| Semivowel | | | j | w | | |

The consonant inventory is identical to that of Standard Japanese but with a different distribution. In Standard Japanese, the palatal series was produced with palatalisation of alveolar consonants before the front vowel /i/ and the semivowel /j/; s → ɕ, t → tɕ, d → dʑ. However, in the Tōhoku dialect they were formed by the palatalisation of /k/ and /ɡ/ and the semivowel /j/; k → tɕ, ɡ → dʑ (kigahatteiru → chihatteɾu; benkyou → benchou) and a shift of /ç/ which was formed by palatalisation of /h/ before /i/ and the semivowel /j/, towards /ɕ/ (hito → shito).

== Grammar ==
In grammar, a volitional and presumptive suffix -be or -ppe is widely used in the region. It is a transformation of -beki, a conjugated form of an archaic suffix -beshi. Since the 2011 Tōhoku earthquake and tsunami, a slogan Ganbappe! ("Let's buckle down!") has often been used in the disaster area.

A directional particle sa is also widely used in the region. It is a transformation of sama ('direction') and almost equivalent to standard ni or e. A Muromachi period proverb "Kyō e, Tsukushi ni, Bandō sa" says that the particle sa was once widely used in Kanto region.

== Sub-dialects ==
The Tōhoku dialects can be broken down geographically and by former han domains:

- Tōhoku dialects
  - Northern Tōhoku
    - Tsugaru dialect (western Aomori Prefecture, the former Tsugaru Domain)
    - Nambu dialect (eastern Aomori Prefecture and northern Iwate Prefecture, the former Nanbu Domain)
      - Morioka dialect (centered Morioka city)
      - Shimokita dialect (Shimokita Peninsula, northeastern Aomori Prefecture)
    - Akita dialect (Akita Prefecture)
    - Shōnai dialect (northwestern Yamagata Prefecture, the former Shonai Domain)
    - Hokuetsu dialect (northeastern Niigata Prefecture)
  - Southern Tōhoku
    - Sendai dialect (Miyagi Prefecture and southern Iwate Prefecture, the former Sendai Domain)
      - Southern Iwate dialect (southern Iwate Prefecture)
      - Kesen dialect (Kesen district, southeastern Iwate Prefecture)
    - Yamagata Nairiku dialect (Yamagata Prefecture)
      - Murayama dialect (central Yamagata Prefecture, centered Yamagata city)
      - Yonezawa dialect or Okitama dialect (southern Yamagata Prefecture, centered Yonezawa city)
      - Shinjō dialect or Mogami dialect (northeastern Yamagata Prefecture, centered Shinjō city)
    - Fukushima dialect (eastern Fukushima Prefecture)
    - Aizu dialect (Aizu region in western Fukushima Prefecture)

In addition, the Eastern Kantō dialects and the coastal dialects of Hokkaidō have many Tōhoku features.

== Umpaku-Tōhoku Dialectal Connection ==
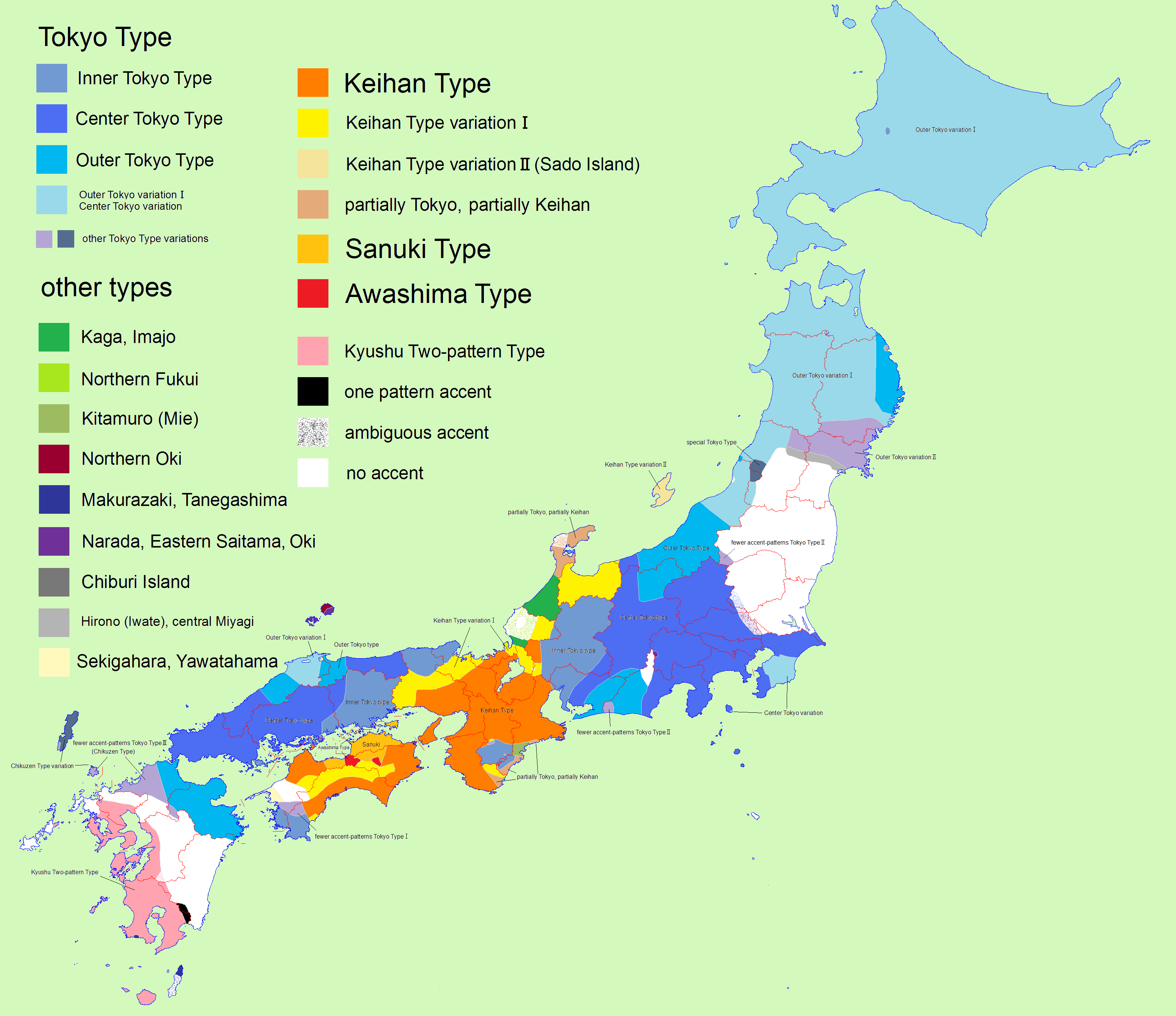
Japanese pitch accent map.

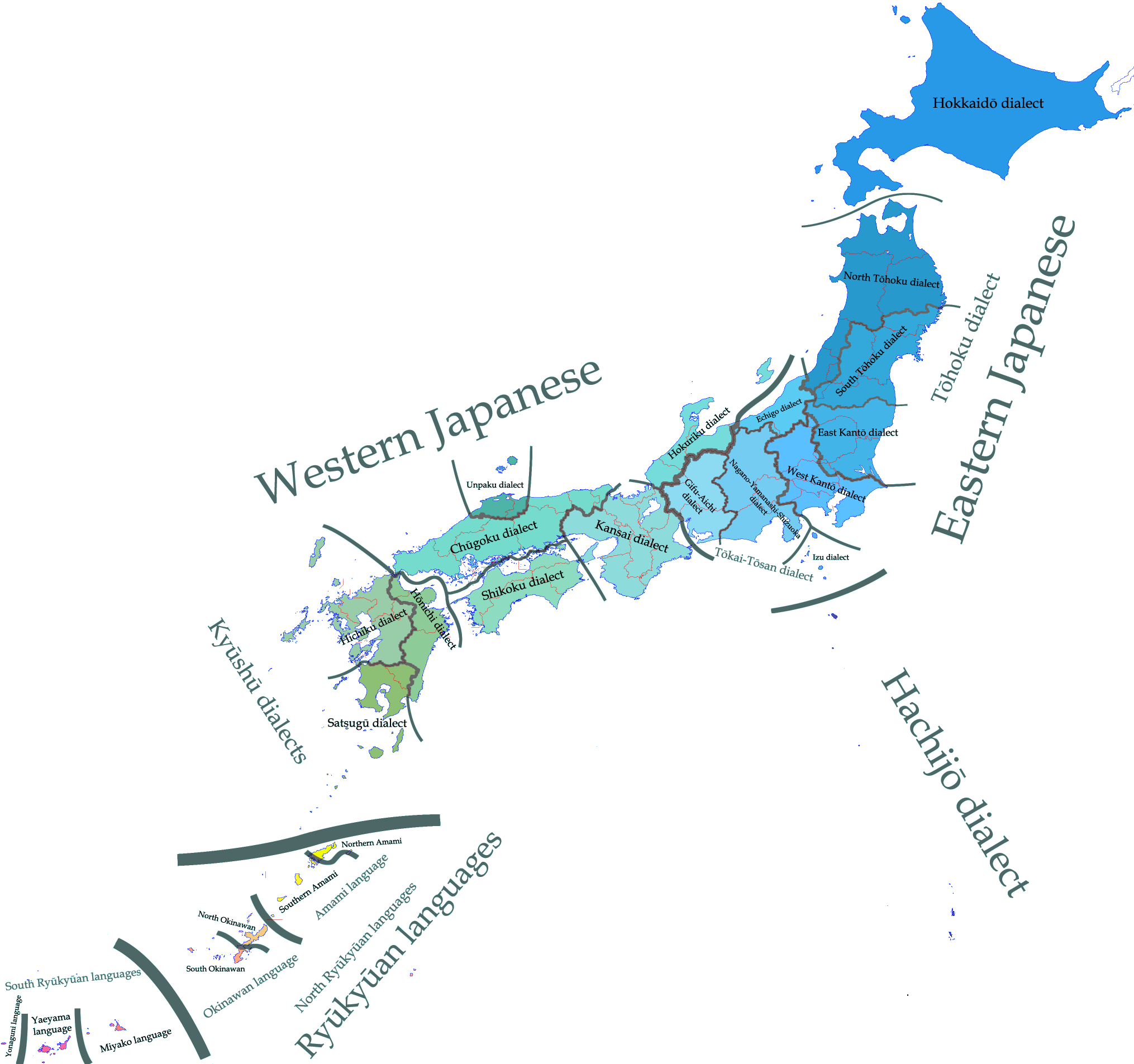
Map of Japanese accents.

The vowel systems of the Izumo (also called Umpaku) and Tōhoku dialects exhibit several shared phonetic characteristics, such as centralized /i/ and /u/ and elevated /e/ and /o/, which make these vowels resemble each other more closely than those in other Japanese dialects. This centralization and elevation have caused vowel mergers in central Izumo and Tōhoku, indicating a historical linguistic change likely propagated from Izumo to the northeast via coastal migration. Archaeological findings, including corner-projected mound burials from 100–250 AD in the Noto Peninsula and Toyama Prefecture, provide evidence for early Izumo influence in these areas. This implies that the distinctive vowel systems of Izumo likely spread to these regions during the Mid to Late Yayoi period. However, the Izumo-style tonal systems (Gairin A and Gairin B) had not yet developed then, as they are not present in the dialects of the Noto Peninsula and Toyama.

Elisabeth de Boer arguments in favour of an Izumo/Tōhoku branch within the Japanese dialects and that pre-existing trade contacts after the defeat of the Emishi in Tōhoku paved the way for immigration to the area. The blurred dialectal transitional area that extends for more than 200 km (120 mi) in southern Niigata may be due to immigrants with two different tone systems arriving from two different directions: part of them coming from the coast (Izumo) and the other part from the central highlands (Chūbu).

Further migration from Izumo to the Tōhoku region likely occurred after the development of the Gairin B tonal innovations. The existence of both Gairin A and Gairin B tonal systems in northern Tōhoku suggests multiple migration waves. Historically, political and economic conditions in Izumo fluctuated between the eastern and western areas. The more advanced Gairin B tonal innovations originated in western Izumo and gradually spread eastward. This is reflected in Tōhoku, where some areas still exhibit a blend of tonal systems.

Migration patterns during the Yayoi period saw rice farmers from western Japan moving to northern Honshū. Early Yayoi settlements in coastal areas such as Ishikawa, Toyama, and western Niigata date back to around 300 BC. However, there is no direct evidence connecting these early settlers to Izumo. Clear indications of Izumo-style influence emerge later, especially through burial mounds dated 100–250 AD. Migration into the Tōhoku region in the late 6th century matches archaeological evidence of the arrival of a new population similar to Kofun cultures found elsewhere in Japan. Prior to this, northern Tōhoku experienced a population decline as the Epi-Jomon people moved towards Hokkaidō. This new population, possibly from Izumo, spread swiftly across northern Tōhoku due to the region’s sparse population, preserving the Izumo-style tone system there better than in southern and central Tōhoku, where there was more linguistic and dialectal interference. The relatively low internal diversity of Tōhoku dialects can be attributed to the later spread of Japanese northeastward compared to other mainland regions of Japan.

== See also ==
- Kirikirijin - a satirical novel in 1981 featuring Tōhoku culture.
- Umpaku dialect - another Zuzu-ben in western Japan.
