= Umpaku dialect =

Japanese dialect group in central San'in

Umpaku Japanese
- Native to: Japan
- Region: eastern San'in
- Language family: Japonic: Japanese; Western Japanese; Umpaku Japanese

Language codes
- ISO 639-3: –
- Glottolog: umpa1238
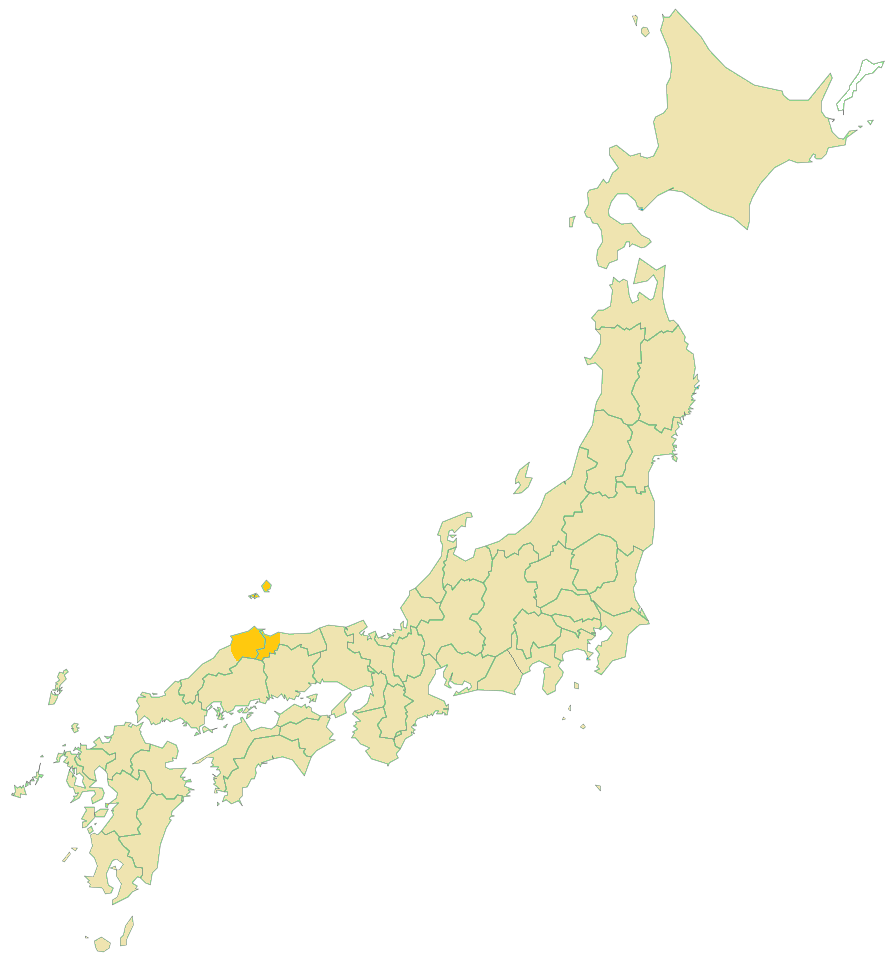
- Umpaku-dialect area

The Umpaku dialect (雲伯方言, Unpaku hōgen) is a group of Japanese dialects spoken in central San'in. The name Unpaku (雲伯) is constructed by extracting a representative kanji from Izumo (出雲) and Hōki (伯耆), the names of former provinces of this region.

An example of Izumo dialect being spoken, 2015

The Umpaku dialects are:

- Izumo dialect (eastern Shimane Prefecture, formerly known as Izumo Province)
- Yonago dialect (western Tottori Prefecture centered on Yonago)
- Oki dialect (Oki islands of Shimane Prefecture)

== Pronunciation ==
Umpaku dialect, especially Izumo-ben, uniquely among dialects in the Chūgoku region, superficially resembles Tōhoku dialects in pronunciation and is thus also called Zūzū-ben. It has neutralization of the high vowels "i" and "u".

=== Vowels ===
Voiceless vowel sounds are common in most western Japanese accents and this is no different in Izumo where they are commonly heard. In Izumo and western Hoki, just like the Tohoku dialects "i" and "u" sounds are centralized. "i" is commonly pronounced [ï] and "u" [ɯ̈].

=== Consonants ===
==== The dropping of "r" sounds ====
In Izumo and western Hoki dialects, "r" sounds are often dropped and replaced with an elongation of the previous vowel. e.g. dare > daa "who", arimasu > aamasu "there is". In particular this often happens to "ri" and "ru" syllables which are almost all replaced by this elongated sound. In some areas, shiroi "white" becomes shie and akeru "to open" becomes akyae. In Oki, these sounds are also replaced by sokuon such as sono tsumodda (sono tsumori da).

=== Remnants of archaic sounds ===
kwa, gwa
The retention of /w/ in these syllables, prominent in Unpaku dialect, is non-standard in modern Japanese.
f instead of h
In the Heian period, all of the "h" row of sounds were pronounced with an "f" sound [ɸ] rather than with a "h" i.e. fa, fi, fu, fe, fo. Izumo still keeps this pronunciation. For example： fashi [ɸasï] = hashi "chopsticks", febi [ɸebï] = hebi "snake"
se, ze
In pronunciation "se" becomes "she" and "ze" becomes "je", similar to the Kyushu dialect.

== Vocabulary ==
- dandan (ダンダン) "thank you"; arigatō in Standard Japanese. It is not used within the family, but rather in conversation with strangers, in much the same way as in Standard Japanese dōmo is used as an abbreviation.
- gosu (ごす) "to give (to speaker)"; kureru in Standard Japanese. E.g. X-san ga wa ni yasai o goita wa "Mr. X gave me vegetables." For a more polite form, goshinaru is also used。
- kyotoi (きょとい) "scary, frightening"; kowai in Standard Japanese. E.g. maa, ano hito wa kyotoi wa! "Oh, that person is scary!", aa! kyoto, kyoto! nigetoku da wa! "Oh, how scary he is! Let's escape!"
- chonboshi (ちょんぼし)/chokkoshi (ちょっこし) "a little"; sukoshi or chotto in Standard Japanese.
- gaina (がいな) "giant"; sugoi or gotsui in Standard Japanese. The animation studio Gainax is named for gaina.
- banjimashite (ばんじまして) "good evening"; konbanwa in Standard Japanese.

== Umpaku-Tōhoku Dialectal Connection ==
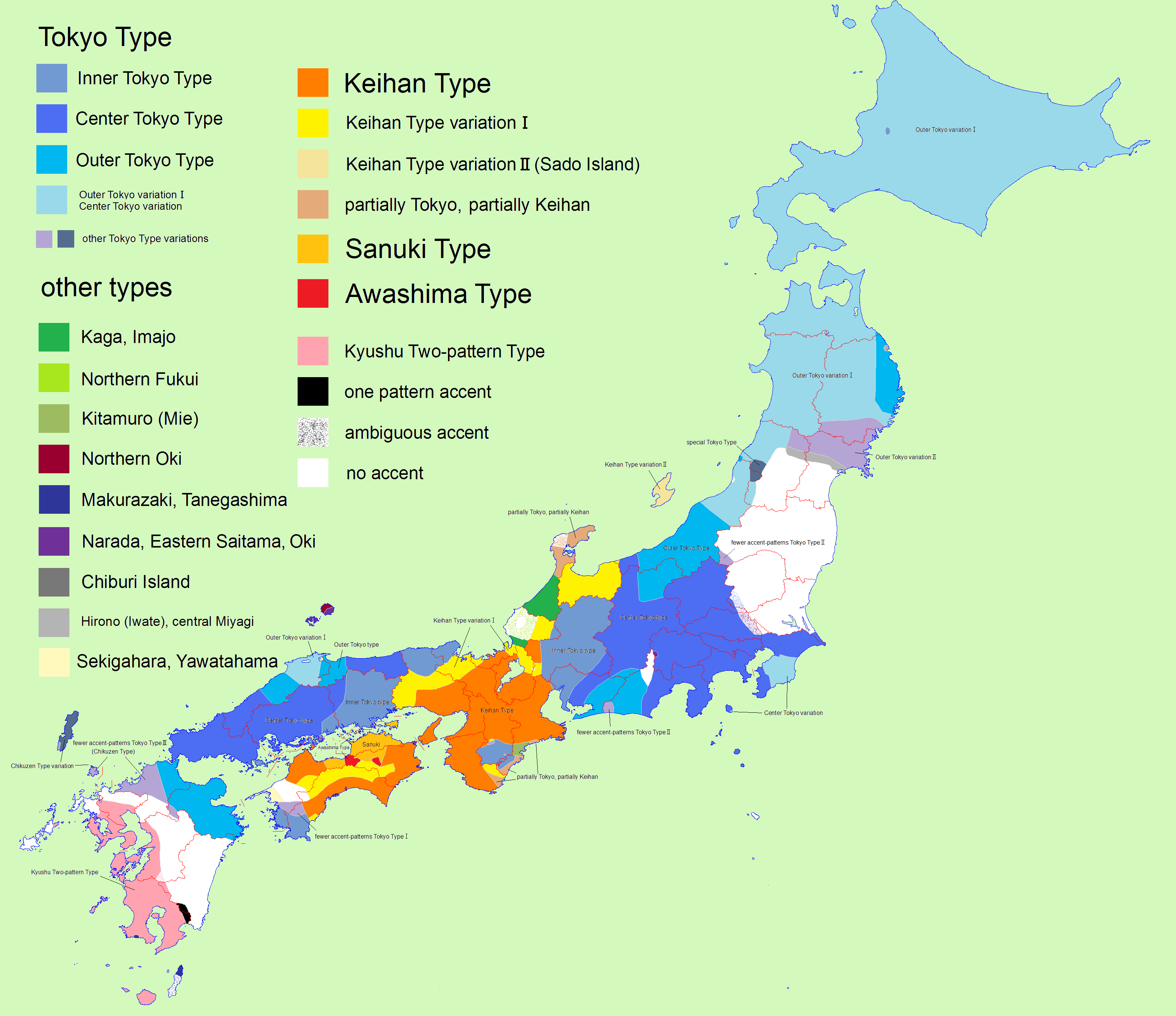
Japanese pitch accent map.

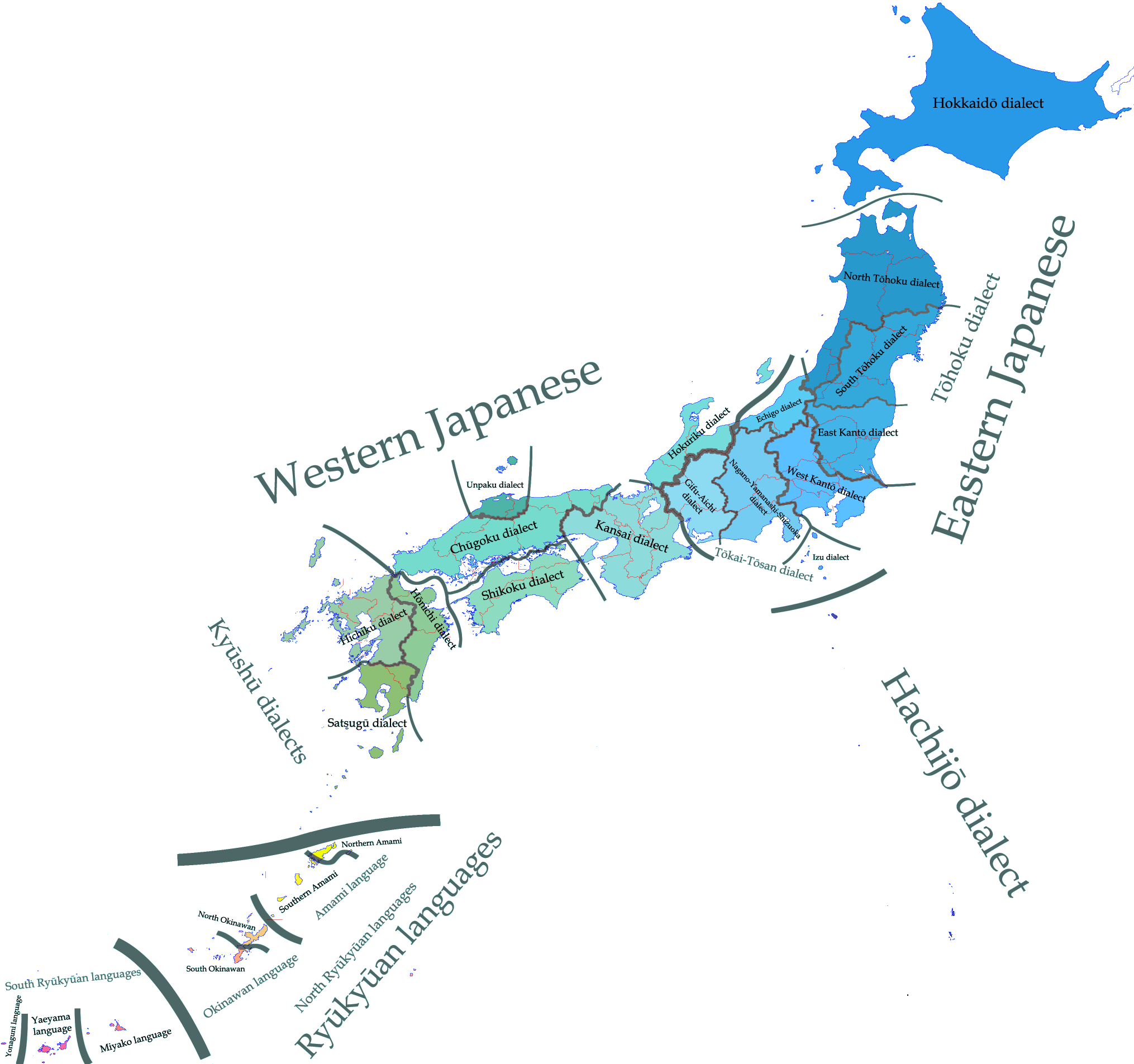
Map of Japanese accents.

The vowel systems of the Izumo (also called Umpaku) and Tōhoku dialects exhibit several shared phonetic characteristics, such as centralized /i/ and /u/ and elevated /e/ and /o/, which make these vowels resemble each other more closely than those in other Japanese dialects. This centralization and elevation have caused vowel mergers in central Izumo and Tōhoku, indicating a historical linguistic change likely propagated from Izumo to the northeast via coastal migration. Archaeological findings, including corner-projected mound burials from 100–250 AD in the Noto Peninsula and Toyama Prefecture, provide evidence for early Izumo influence in these areas. This implies that the distinctive vowel systems of Izumo likely spread to these regions during the Mid to Late Yayoi period. However, the Izumo-style tonal systems (Gairin A and Gairin B) had not yet developed then, as they are not present in the dialects of the Noto Peninsula and Toyama.

Elisabeth de Boer arguments in favour of an Izumo/Tōhoku branch within the Japanese dialects and that pre-existing trade contacts after the defeat of the Emishi in Tōhoku paved the way for immigration to the area. The blurred dialectal transitional area that extends for more than 200 km in southern Niigata may be due to immigrants with two different tone systems arriving from two different directions: part of them coming from the coast (Izumo) and the other part from the central highlands (Chūbu).

Further migration from Izumo to the Tōhoku region likely occurred after the development of the Gairin B tonal innovations. The existence of both Gairin A and Gairin B tonal systems in northern Tōhoku suggests multiple migration waves. Historically, political and economic conditions in Izumo fluctuated between the eastern and western areas. The more advanced Gairin B tonal innovations originated in western Izumo and gradually spread eastward. This is reflected in Tōhoku, where some areas still exhibit a blend of tonal systems.

Migration patterns during the Yayoi period saw rice farmers from western Japan moving to northern Honshū. Early Yayoi settlements in coastal areas such as Ishikawa, Toyama, and western Niigata date back to around 300 BC. However, there is no direct evidence connecting these early settlers to Izumo. Clear indications of Izumo-style influence emerge later, especially through burial mounds dated 100–250 AD. Migration into the Tōhoku region in the late 6th century matches archaeological evidence of the arrival of a new population similar to Kofun cultures found elsewhere in Japan. Prior to this, northern Tōhoku experienced a population decline as the Epi-Jomon people moved towards Hokkaidō. This new population, possibly from Izumo, spread swiftly across northern Tōhoku due to the region’s sparse population, preserving the Izumo-style tone system there better than in southern and central Tōhoku, where there was more linguistic and dialectal interference. The relatively low internal diversity of Tōhoku dialects can be attributed to the later spread of Japanese northeastward compared to other mainland regions of Japan.
