= Origins of the Ainu =

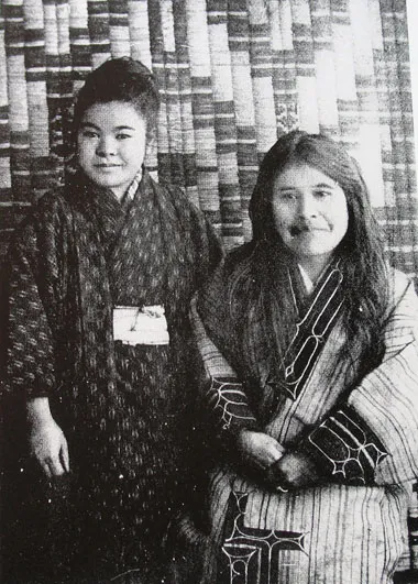
A picture of Imekanu, right, with her niece Yukie Chiri, a famous Ainu Japanese transcriber and translator of Ainu epic tales. (1922)

The origins of the Ainu have long been of interest to scholars from Japan, Europe, and the USA. While historically there were inquiries into them being closely related to Europeans, modern analysis shows that they are related to other nearby Asian groups, and originated from local ancestral populations.

== Background ==
The Ainu are regarded as having descended from the indigenous Japanese hunter-gatherers who lived in Japan during the Jōmon period (c. 14,000 to 300 BCE).

The exact origins of the early Ainu remain unclear, but it is generally agreed to be linked to the Satsumon culture of the Epi-Jōmon period, with later influences from the nearby Okhotsk culture. The Ainu culture may be better described as an "Ainu cultural complex", taking into account the regional variable subgroups of Ainu peoples. While the Ainu can be considered a continuation of the indigenous Jomon culture, they also display links to surrounding cultures, pointing to a larger cultural complex flourishing around the Sea of Okhotsk. Some authors have also described the development of the Ainu culture as the "resistance" of a Jomon society to the emerging Japanese state.

The historical Ainu economy was based on subsistence farming as well as hunting, fishing, and gathering, alongside trading with groups in the surrounding islands and mainland Asia.

Linguists such as Juha Janhunen and Alexander Vovin argue for a Satsumon origin of Ainu dialects, with deeper links to cultures centered in Central or Northern Honshu. This is in part supported by Ainu-derived loanwords observed in Eastern Old Japanese and the probable distant link between the Ainu and the Emishi.

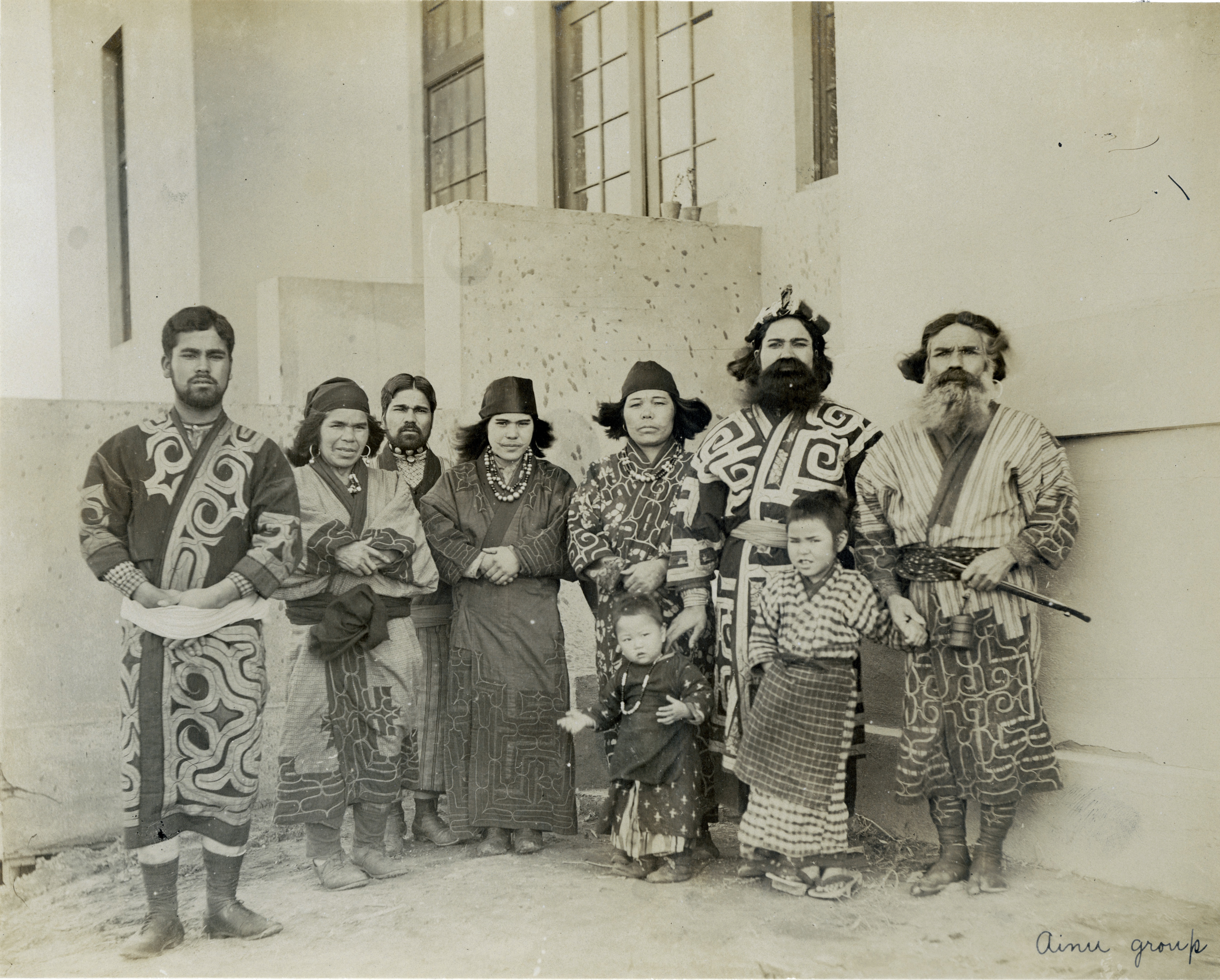
Ainu people of Hokkaido, exhibited at the 1904 Louisiana Purchase Exposition.

It has also been noted that the Okhotsk culture played a role in the formation of the later Ainu culture. The origin of the Okhotsk culture itself is subject to research. While Okhotsk remains display affinity to the modern Nivkh people of northern Sakhalin, both also display affinities to the Jōmon peoples of Japan, pointing to a possible heterogeneous makeup of Okhotsk society. Satsumon pottery has been found among Okhotsk sites, pointing to a complex network of contacts in the wider area around the Sea of Okhotsk.

The emergence of the Ainu culture is henceforth primarily attributed to the Satsumon culture, which later received some contributions from the Okhotsk culture via cultural contacts in northern Hokkaido after the Satsumon culture expanded northwards and into Sakhalin. This view has been corroborated by later analyses.

Archaeologists have considered that bear worship, which is a religious practice widely observed among the northern Eurasian ethnic groups, including the Ainu, Finns, Nivkh, and Sami, was also shared by the Okhotsk people. On the other hand, no traces of such a religious practice have ever been discovered from archaeological sites of the Jomon and Epi-Jomon periods, which were anterior to the Ainu cultural period. [...] This implies that the Okhotsk culture contributed to the forming of the Ainu culture.

== Relationship with the historical Emishi ==
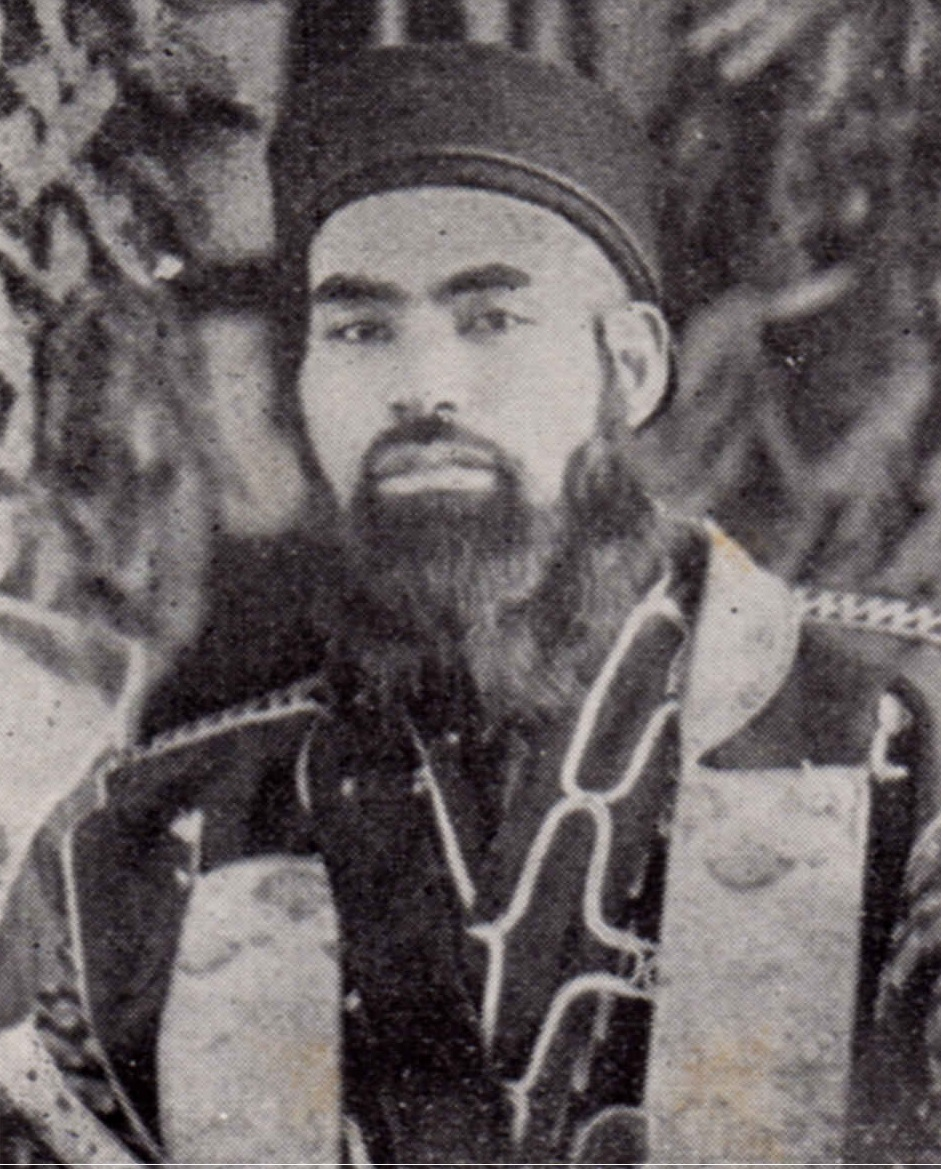
A high-status Ainu man

While the view that the ancient Emishi were identical to the Ainu has been largely disproven by current research, the exact relationship between them is still under dispute. It is agreed that at least some Emishi spoke Ainu languages and were ethnically related to the Ainu. The Emishi may, however, have also included non-Ainu groups, which can either be associated with groups distantly related to the Ainu (Ainu-like groups) but forming their own ethnicity, or early Japonic-speakers outside the influence of the Yamato court. The Emishi display clear material culture links to the Ainu of Hokkaido. Based on Ainu-like toponyms throughout Tohoku, it is argued that the Emishi, like the Ainu, descended from the Epi-Jōmon tribes and initially spoke Ainu-related languages.

The term "Emishi" in the Nara period (710–794) referred to people who lived in the Tohoku region and whose lifestyle and culture differed markedly from that of the Yamato people; it was originally a highly cultural and political concept with no racial distinction.

From the mid-Heian period onward, Emishi who did not fall under the governance of the Yamato Kingship were singled out as northern Emishi. They began to be referred to as "Ezo" (Emishi).

The first written reference to "Ezo", which is thought to be Ainu, can be found in Suwa Daimyōjin Ekotoba, which was written in 1356. Indeed, Ainu have lived in Sakhalin, the Kuril Islands, Hokkaido, and the northern Tohoku region since the 13th century.

== Religion and folklore ==
According to various creation myths among the Ainu, the Ainu are descended from either bears or wolves.

== European anthropology ==
Historically many Europeans tried to argue for an origin of the Ainu that related them to white Europeans, due to perceived similarities in facial structures, the increased presence of facial and body hair among the Ainu compared to Yamato Japanese, and a perceived paler complexion.

== Genetics ==
=== Paternal lineages ===
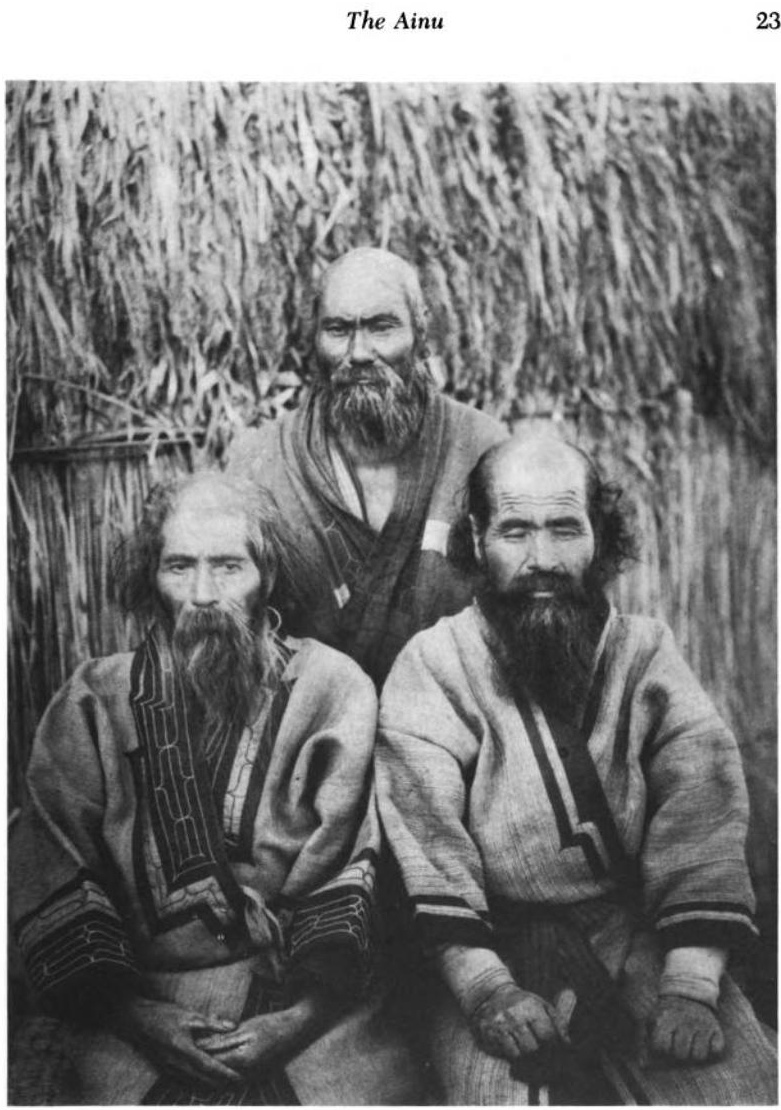
Three Ainu from Hokkaido in traditional dress

An analysis of 16 Ainu male individuals found that the majority (14/16) belong to Y-DNA Haplogroup D-M55, while a minority (2/16) belongs to Haplogroup C-M217. D-M55 is found throughout the Japanese archipelago, with very high frequencies among the Ainu of Hokkaido. C-M217 is found more commonly among populations from Northeast Asia.

=== Maternal lineages ===
An analysis of 51 Ainu individuals found that around 51% of their mtDNA subclades are unique to the Ainu, while the remaining haplogroups are shared with other Asian populations, especially with the Nivkhs in northern Sakhalin and the Koryaks on the Kamchatka Peninsula.

Of the 51 Ainu individuals, around 27% (14/51) belong to N9 (of which 10 were assigned to subclade Y and four to unclassified N9 clades), around 24% (12/51) to D, around 20% (10/51) to M7, and around 20% (10/51) to G; the minor haplogroups are A (2/51), B (1/51), F (1/51), and an unclassified subclade of M not belonging to M7, M8, CZ, D, or G.

=== Autosomal DNA ===
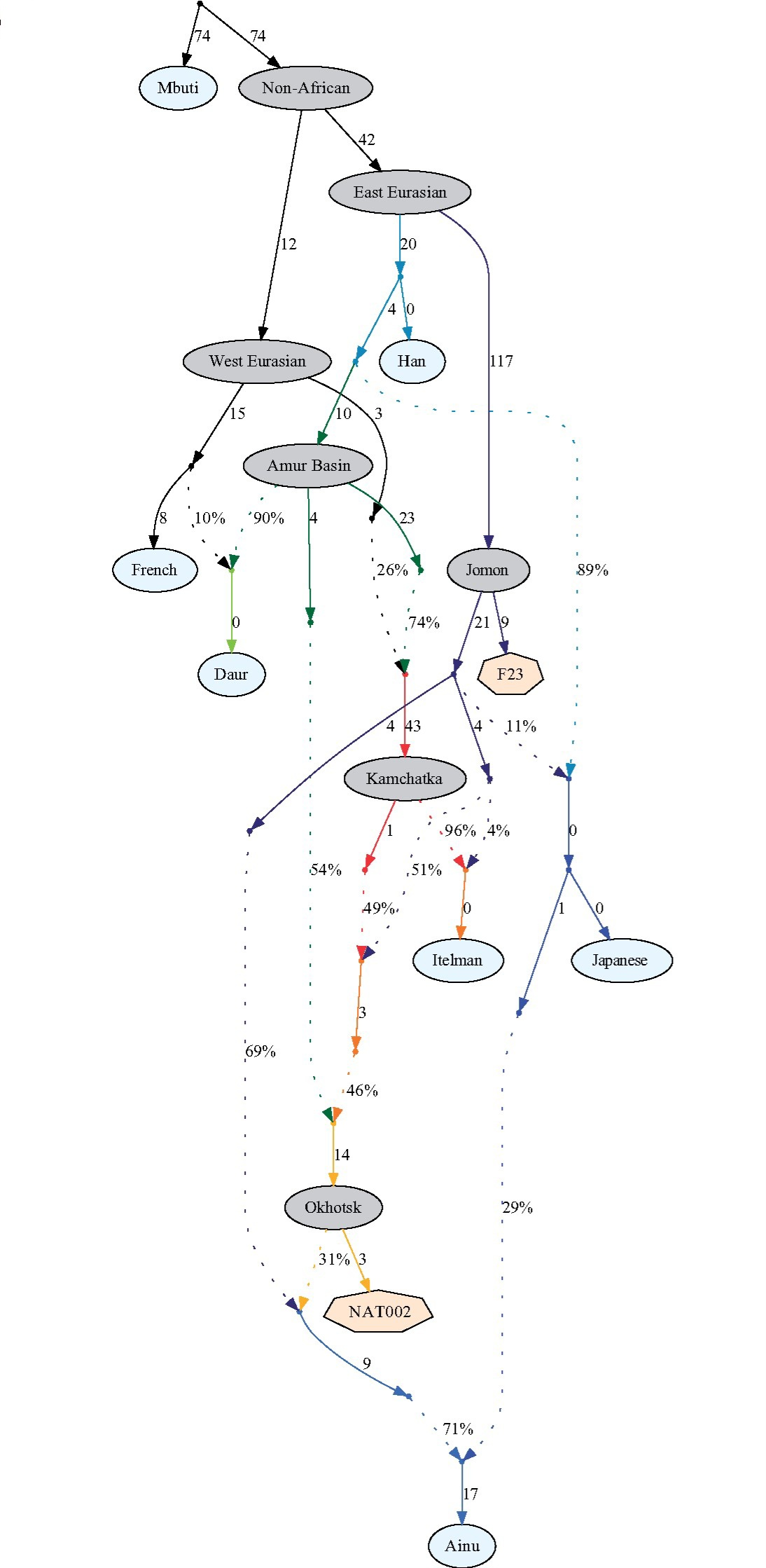
Admixture graph based on the genomic data of Okhotsk (NAT002), Jomon (F23), and modern populations

The Ainu are closely related to the Jōmon peoples of Japan. According to genetic analyses of Jōmon remains, they represent a deeply diverged East Asian lineage. This lineage arose after the divergence between Tianyuan and Hoabinhian lineages but diverged from Ancient East Asians before they split into Ancient Northern East Asians and Ancient Southern East Asians. However, the Jōmon consistently form a clade with Ancient Northern East Asians and Ancient Southern East Asians and exhibit a high degree of genetic homogeneity. Several studies model the Jōmon as a mixture of Onge-related (44%) and Tianyuan-related (56%) ancestries or as a mixture of Onge-related (51.6%) and Early Neolithic Xiaogao-related (48.4%) ancestries, with the latter having Tungusic affinities. This genetic profile is similar to that found in modern Tibetans, except for Gannan Tibetans.

Beyond their broad affinity with Eastern Asian lineages, the Jomon display a weak affinity for Ancient North Eurasians (ANE), which may be associated with the introduction of microblade technology to Northeast Asia and northern East Asia during the Last Glacial Maximum via the ANE or Ancient Paleo-Siberians. Other studies, however, suggest no direct gene flow from ANE-like (MA-1) sources into the Jōmon or that it was mediated by Northern East Asian populations who themselves were mixed with ANE. According to a 2025 study, whilst the Jōmon have the lowest Denisovan ancestry among East Asians like West Eurasians, it is not attributed to either West Eurasian or Hoabinhian admixture, which are not found in the Jōmon. However, the Jōmon most likely inherited their Denisovan ancestry from the same ancestral populations that ANE-related and Tianyuan-related populations inherited their Denisovan ancestry from. Other studies suggest that Yana-related admixture is mostly found in Hokkaido Jōmon but clarify that "absolute differences in Yana-related drift among Jōmon and other EASs are modest". They might also reflect recent admixture with northern populations.

The genetic makeup of the Ainu represents a "deep branch of East Asian diversity". Compared to contemporary East Asian populations, the Ainu share "a closer genetic relationship with northeast Siberians". In addition, the Ainu display relatively closer affinities with "lowland East Asians" than "highland East Asians", suggesting gene flow between Ainu and "lowland East Asians". To exemplify, the Ainu might have contributed some ancestry to surrounding populations around the Sea of Okhotsk. Differences in the frequency of the derived EDAR gene variant between the Ainu and contemporary East Asians suggest that the ancestors of the Ainu may not have shared the selective pressures with other Ancestral East Asian populations. The Ainu, however, share two variants in the ADH gene cluster with other East Asians at high frequency, unlike Tibetans and Sherpa, "raising the possibility that selective pressure on these variants was different in the high-altitude environments."

Among modern populations, the Ainu are most closely related to the Ryukyuans of southern Japan, followed by contemporary Japanese people. Compared to other East Asian populations, the Ainu are an outgroup, pointing to long-lasting isolation after their divergence. By analyzing the SNP loci of Ainu individuals, it was found that they carry genes associated with facial structure found among Europeans and hair and tooth morphology found among East Asians. The Ainu also exhibit strong influence from Northeast Asian populations. Genetic analyses of HLA I and HLA II genes as well as HLA-A, B, and DRB1 gene frequencies placed the Ainu in an intermediate position between indigenous peoples of the Americas and contemporary Northeast Asians. Other studies show that there was better preservation of phenotypes associated with the Jōmon, including Ainu people, and Yayoi populations in the southernmost regions of Japan due to less influence from recent Northeast Asian migrations. The Jōmon remains also exhibit homogeneity in terms of their craniofacial features although there's evidence of variation in terms of their neurocraniums. Variation also exists within the same phases and geographic regions.

Studies on modern-day Ainu estimate that they derive between 66% and 79.3% of their ancestry from the Jōmon lineage. Another study shows that modern Ainu people derive c. 28.1–29% or 44% of their ancestries from mainland Japanese and Okhostk (Nivkhs), depending on whether they're modeled as a mixture of Jōmon, Okhotsk and mainland Japanese peoples or Jōmon and mainland Japanese peoples respectively, which were both acceptable. An ancient Okhotsk-related individual (NAT002) had Northeastern Asian-related ancestry (24.6%), East Asian-related ancestry (15.8%), Jōmon-related ancestry (33.2%) and ancestry related to Itelmen and Koryaks (26.4%). These admixture proportions are similar to what's found in Lower Amur populations, including the Nivkh and Ulch. Ainu from central and eastern Hokkaido also have higher Jōmon affinities than those from western Hokkaido, who have more mainland Japanese affinities.
