= Akita dialect =

Dialect

- 秋田弁
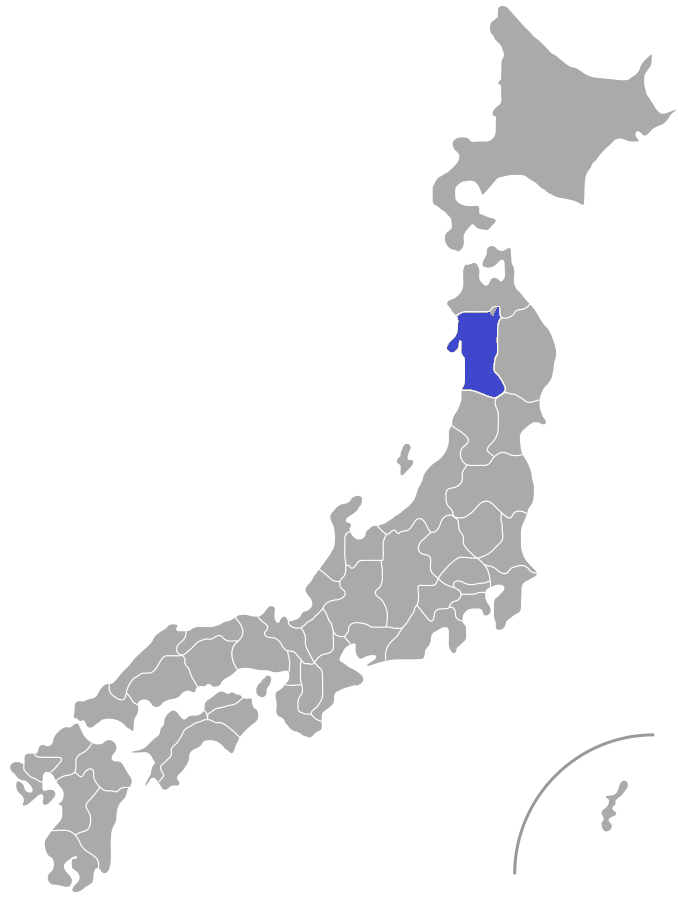
- Akita dialect area.
- Native to: Japan
- Region: Akita
- Language family: Japonic: Japanese; Eastern Japanese; Tōhoku; Northern; Akita dialect
- Dialects: Northern; Central; Southern

Language codes
- ISO 639-3: –
- Glottolog: akit1240
- IETF: ja-u-sd-jp05

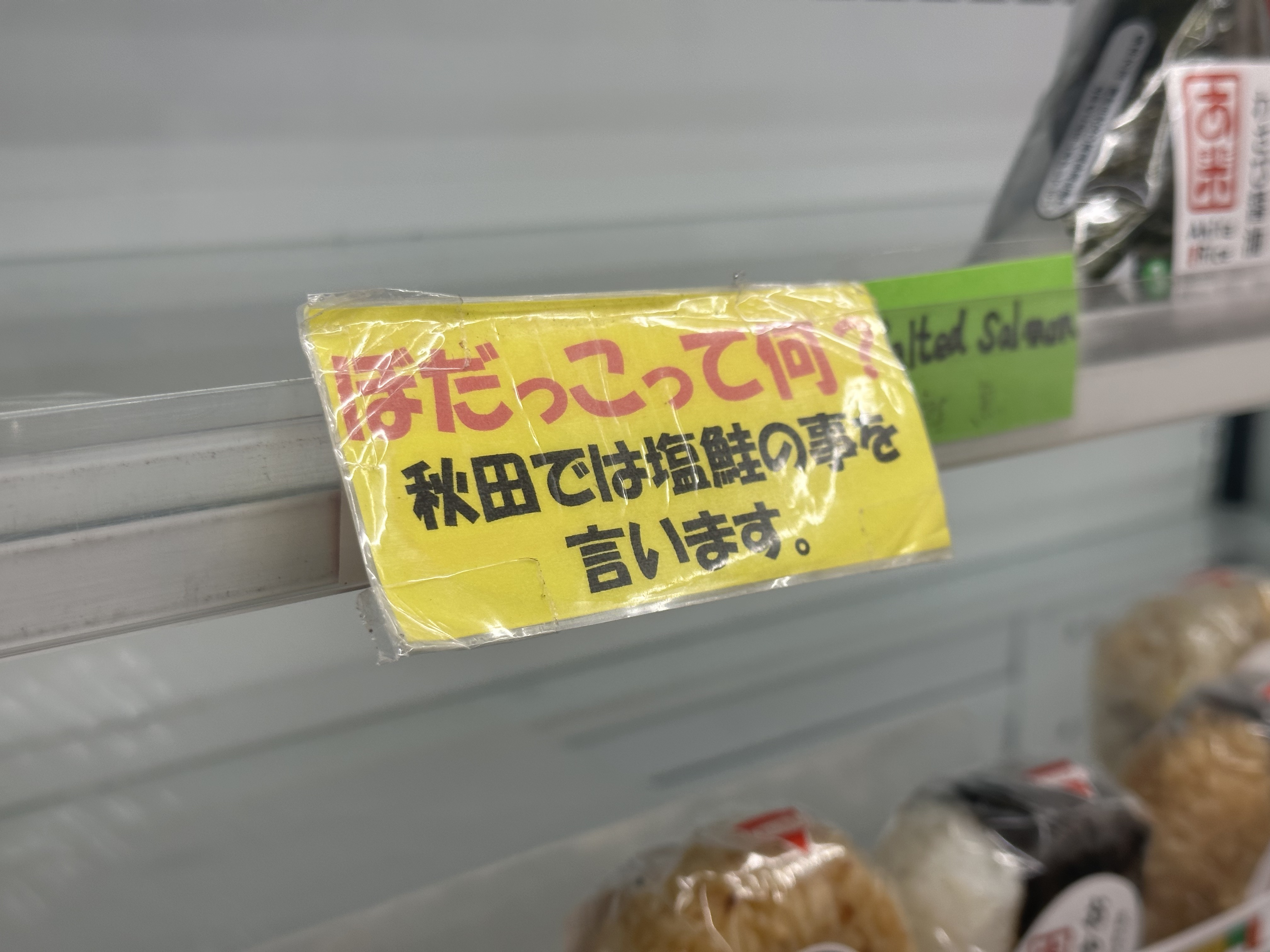
A sign explaining a word in Akita dialect

The Akita dialect (秋田弁, Akita-ben) is a Japanese dialect spoken in Akita Prefecture.

== Classification ==
The dialect is a member of the Kita-Ōu dialect group within the Tōhoku dialect of Eastern Japanese. Other dialects in the group include dialects spoken in Aomori, north-central Iwate, coastal Yamagata and the Agakita region in Niigata Prefecture.

=== Sub-divisions ===
- Hokubu (northern): Spoken across Kazuno, Kita-Akita and Yamamoto.
- Chūōbu (central): Spoken in Minami-Akita and Kawabe.
- Nambu (southern): Spoken across Senboku, Hiraka, Ogachi and Yuri.

== Examples ==
English	Standard Japanese	Akita dialect
I	watashi	oi
you	anata	ada, nga(impolite)
cute	kawaii	menke
countryside	inaka	jengo
warm	atatakai	nugi
money	(o-)kane	jenko, jen
forehead	hitai, (o-)deko	nazugi
cooked rice/meal	gohan	mama
penis	(o-)chinchin	gamo
liar	usotsuki	bashikogi
child	kodomo	warashi
use force	boryoku wo furuu	arageru
grow (plant)	sodatsu	ogaru
join	sanka suru	kadaru
go bankrupt	hasan suru	kamadokyasu
steal	nusumu	gameru
get angry	okoru	goshagu

== See also ==
- Matagi dialect
