= Emishi =

Ancient ethnic group in northern Honshū, Japan

Emishi people
- Tribe
- Ethnicity: Emishi
- Location: northern Japan
- Language: Unknown, possibly Ainuic or Japonic
- Religion: Indigenous religion

The Emishi, Ebisu or Ezo (蝦夷; Japanese pronunciation: [é̞.mʲì.ɕì, é̞.bʲì.sɨ̀, è̞.bʲí.sɨ́, é̞.(d͡)zò̞] (Note: The name of the Ebisu nation and placenames are pronounced like this. The name of the god Ebisu is pronounced [è̞.bʲí.sɨ́] instead.)) were a group of people who lived in parts of northern Honshū in present-day Japan, especially in the Tōhoku region.

The first mention of the Emishi in literature that can be corroborated with outside sources dates to the 5th century, in which they are referred to as máorén (Chinese: 毛人—, lit. 'hairy people') in Chinese records. Some Emishi tribes resisted the rule of various Japanese emperors during the Asuka, Nara, and early Heian periods (7th–10th centuries).

The origin of the Emishi is disputed and continues to be a topic of discussion; however, some theories propose a connection to either the Zoku-Jōmon peoples of Japan that became the ancestors of the Ainu people, or pre-Yamato migrants. It has been posited that the Emishi may have either spoken a unique Japonic language similar to the Umpaku dialect, or a distinct language related to the Ainu languages, or both. Moreover, even though there is a significant geographical gap between Northeast Japan and the South—particularly Northern Kyushu, which is believed to be the initial site of rice agriculture in the archipelago—evidence indicates that local communities in northeast Japan entirely embraced rice cultivation in the early Yayoi period. This relationship could have been facilitated by human migration along the coastline of the Sea of Japan, suggesting a link between the northeast and the adoption of rice farming during the Yayoi era. A majority of scholars have also noted cultural similarities to the Ainu. The Emishi that inhabited northern Honshu likely consisted of several tribes, which included pre-Ainu people, non-Yamato, and admixed people, who united and resisted the expansion of the Yamato Kingship and subsequent states.

== Etymology ==
The first mention of the Emishi is from a Chinese source, the Book of Song in 478 CE, which referred to them as "hairy people" (毛人). The book refers to "the 55 kingdoms (國) of the hairy people (毛人) of the East" as a report by King Bu, one of the five kings of Wa.

The first recorded use of the Japanese word Emishi is in the Nihon Shoki in 720 CE, where the word appears in the phonetic spelling 愛瀰詩 for emi_{1}si (see also Old Japanese § Vowels for an explanation of the subscript). This is in the record of Emperor Jimmu, stating that his armed forces defeated a group of Emishi before Jimmu was enthroned as the Emperor of Japan. According to the Nihon Shoki, Takenouchi no Sukune in the era of Emperor Keikō proposed the subjugation of the Emishi of Hitakami no Kuni (日高見国) in eastern Japan.

In later records, the kanji spelling changed to 蝦夷, composed of the characters for "shrimp" and "barbarian". The use of the "shrimp" spelling is thought to refer to facial hair, like the long whiskers of a shrimp, but this is not certain. The "barbarian" portion clearly described an outsider, living beyond the borders of the emerging empire of Japan, which saw itself as a civilizing influence; thus, the empire was able to justify its conquest. This kanji spelling was first seen in the T'ang sources that describe the meeting with the two Emishi that the Japanese envoy brought with him to China. The kanji spelling may have been adopted from China.

The oldest attested pronunciation emi_{1}si may have come from Old Japanese, perhaps from the word "yumishi" meaning "bowyer" (in reference to an important weapon, the bow), but some suggest that it came instead from the Ainu term emushi meaning "sword". The yumishi theory is problematic, as the Old Japanese term for "bowyer" was 弓削 (yuge), whereas 弓師 (yumishi) is not attested until the 1600s. Meanwhile, the later pronunciation Ebisu (derived from Emishi) was also spelled as 戎, which also means "warrior", possibly aligning with the proposed Ainu derivation via metonymy wherein the word for "sword" was used to mean "warrior".

== History ==
The Emishi were represented by different tribes, some of whom became allies of the Japanese (referred to as "fushu" and "ifu") while others remained hostile (referred to as "iteki"). The Emishi in northeastern Honshū relied on horses in warfare, developing a unique style of warfare in which horse archery and hit-and-run tactics proved very effective against the slower contemporary Japanese imperial army that mostly relied on heavy infantry. The livelihood of the Emishi was based on hunting and gathering as well as on the cultivation of grains such as millet and barley. Recently, it has been thought that they practiced rice cultivation in areas where rice could be easily grown.

The first major attempts to subjugate the Emishi in the 8th century were largely unsuccessful. The imperial armies, which were modeled after the mainland Chinese armies, proved unsuccessful when faced with the guerrilla tactics employed by the Emishi. Following the adoption and development by the imperial forces of horseback archery and the guerrilla tactics used by the Emishi, the army soon saw success, leading to the eventual defeat of the Emishi. The success of the gradual change in battle tactics came at the very end of the 8th century in the 790s under the command of the general Sakanoue no Tamuramaro. The adoption of horseback archery and horseback combat later led to the development of the samurai. Following their defeat, the Emishi either submitted themselves to imperial authorities as fushu or ifu, or migrated further north, some to Hokkaidō.

By the mid-9th century, most of the land held by the Emishi in Honshū had been conquered, and the Emishi became part of wider Japanese society. However, they continued to be influential in local politics, as subjugated, though powerful, Emishi families created semi-autonomous feudal domains in the north. In the two centuries following the conquest, a few of these domains became regional states that came into conflict with the central government.

The Emishi are described in the Nihon Shoki, which presents a view of the Emishi stemming more from a need to justify the Yamato policy of conquest than from accuracy to the Emishi people:

Amongst these Eastern savages the Yemishi are the most powerful; their men and women live together promiscuously; there is no distinction of father and child. In winter, they dwell in holes; in summer, they live in nests. Their clothing consists of furs, and they drink blood. Brothers are suspicious of one another. In ascending mountains, they are like flying birds; in going through the grass, they are like fleet quadrupeds. When they receive a favour, they forget it, but if an injury is done them they never fail to revenge it. Therefore, they keep arrows in their top-knots and carry swords within their clothing. Sometimes, they draw together their fellows and make inroads on the frontier. At other times, they take the opportunity of the harvest to plunder the people. If attacked, they conceal themselves in the herbage; if pursued, they flee into the mountains. Therefore, ever since antiquity, they have not been steeped in the kingly civilizing influences.

=== Battles with Yamato army ===
The Nihon Shoki's entry for Emperor Yūryaku, also known as Ohatsuse no Wakatakeru, records an uprising, after the Emperor's death, of Emishi troops who had been levied to support an expedition to Korea. Emperor Yūryaku is suspected to be King Bu, but the date and the existence of Yūryaku are uncertain, and the Korean reference may be anachronistic. However, the compilers clearly felt that the reference to Emishi troops was credible in this context.

In 658, Abe no Hirafu's naval expedition of 180 ships reached Aguta (present day Akita Prefecture) and Watarishima (Hokkaidō). An alliance with Aguta Emishi, Tsugaru Emishi and Watarishima Emishi was formed by Abe who then stormed and defeated a settlement of the Mishihase (Su-shen in the Aston translation of the Nihongi), a people of unknown origin. This is one of the earliest reliable records of the Emishi people extant. The Mishihase may have been another ethnic group who competed with the ancestors of the Ainu for Hokkaidō. The expedition happens to be the furthest northern penetration of the Japanese Imperial army until the 16th century, and that later settlement was from a local Japanese warlord who was independent of any central control.

In 709, the fort of Ideha was created close to present day Akita. This was a bold move since the intervening territory between Akita and the northwestern countries of Japan was not under government control. The Emishi of Akita, in alliance with Michinoku, attacked Japanese settlements in response. Saeki no Iwayu was appointed Sei Echigo Emishi shōgun. He used 100 ships from the Japan sea side countries along with soldiers recruited from the eastern countries and defeated the Echigo (present day Niigata) and later Dewa (present day Akita and Yamagata) Emishi.

In 724, Taga Fort was built by Ōno no Omi Azumahito near present-day Sendai and became the largest administrative fort in the northeast region of Michinoku. As Chinju shōgun, he steadily built forts across the Sendai plain and into the interior mountains in what is now Yamagata Prefecture. Guerilla warfare was practiced by the horse riding Emishi who kept up pressure on these forts, but Emishi allies, ifu and fushu, were also recruited and promoted by the Japanese to fight against their kinsmen.

In 758, after a long period of stalemate, the Japanese army under Fujiwara no Asakari penetrated into what is now northern Miyagi Prefecture, and established Momonofu Castle on the Kitakami River. The fort was built despite constant attacks by the Emishi of Isawa (present-day southern Iwate prefecture).

=== Thirty-Eight Years' War ===
Thirty-Eight Years' War
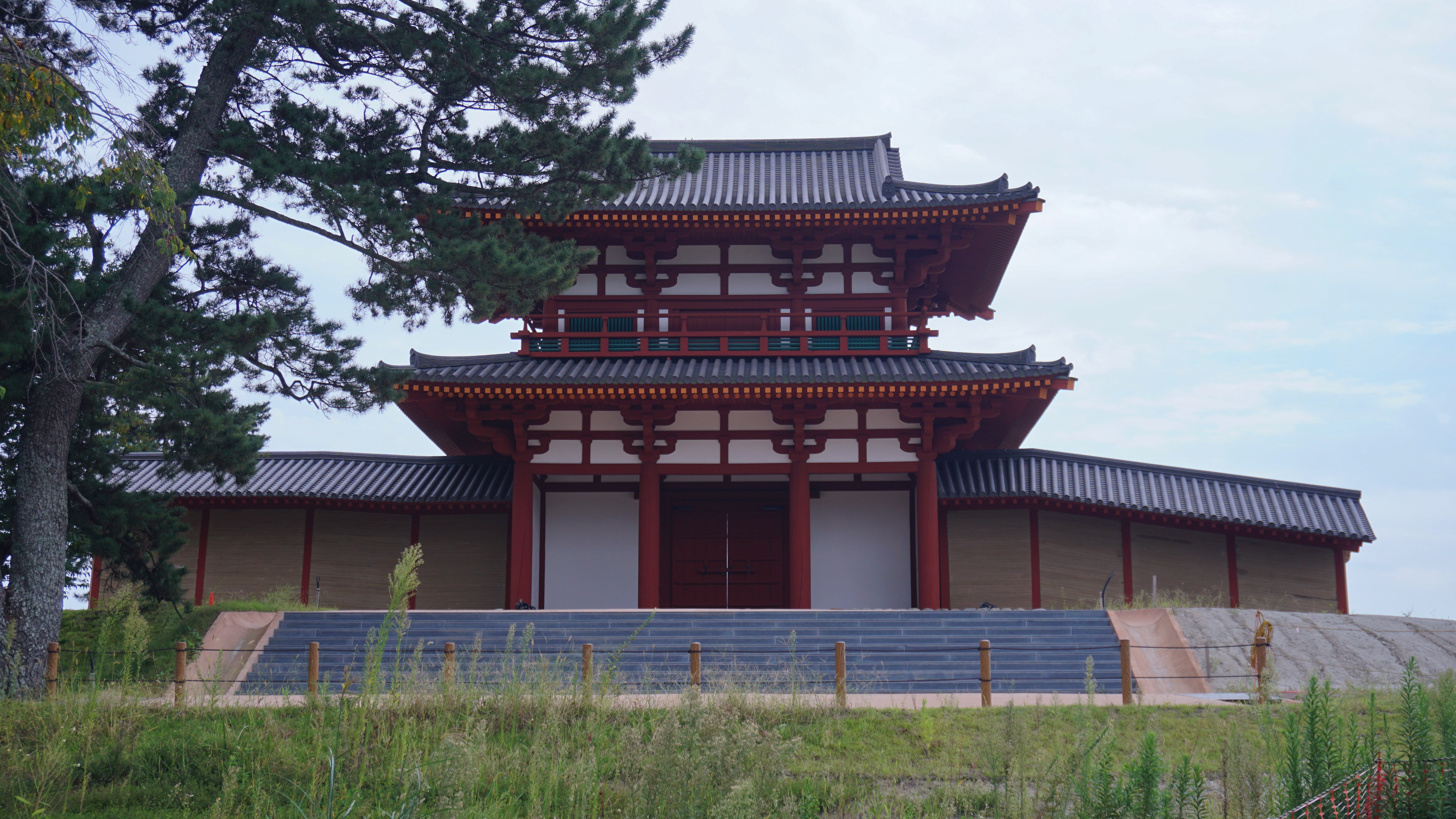
- Reconstructed south gate of Taga Castle.
Date	774–812
Location	Tōhoku region, Japan
Result	Dynasty victory

Belligerents
Yamato	Emishi

Commanders and leaders
Emperor Kōnin; Emperor Kanmu; Emperor Saga; Ōtomo no Otomaro; Sakanoue no Tamuramaro; Fun'ya no Watamaro; Ōtomo no Surugamaro; Ki no Hirozumi †; Ōtomo no Yakamochi; Kudara no Konikishi Shuntetsu; Tajihi no Umi	Aterui (executed); More (executed); Morokuri; Otoshiro; Yasoshima; Isaseko; Ikako

Strength
Unknown	Unknown

Casualties and losses
Unknown	Unknown

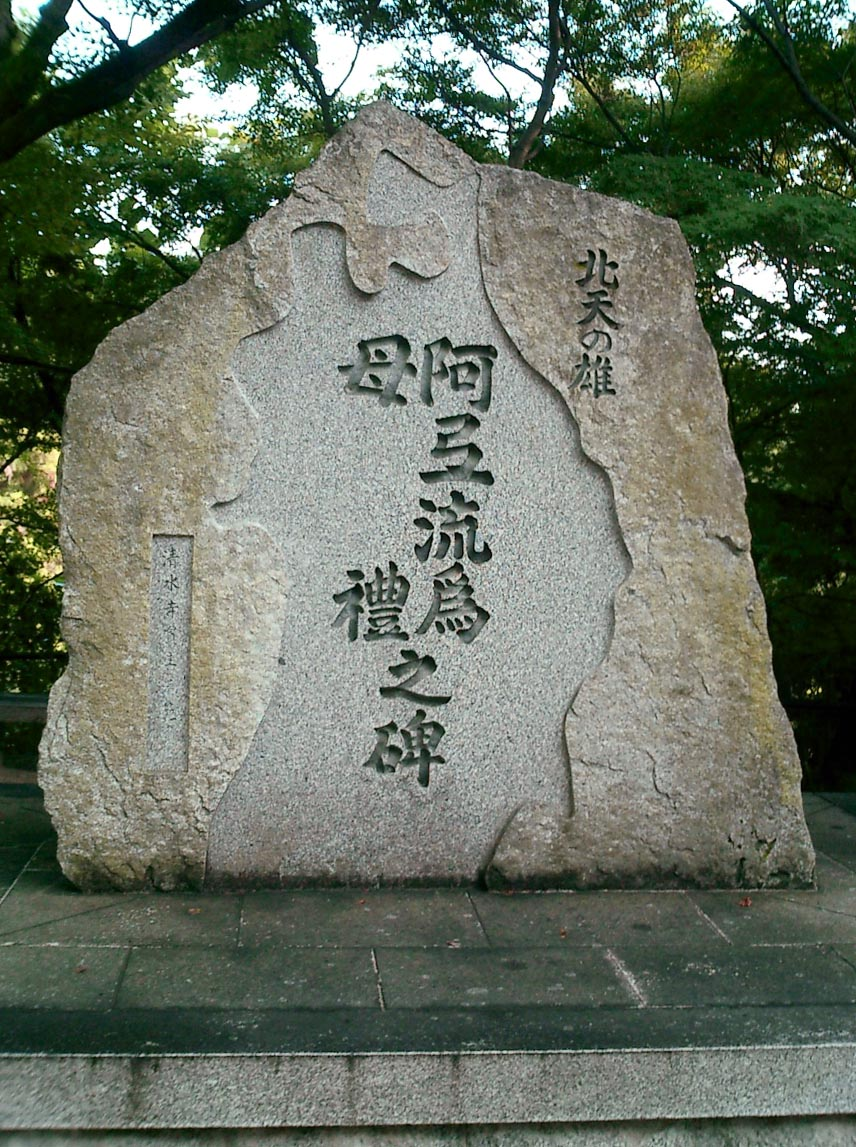
The monument for commending Aterui and More at Kiyomizu-dera in Kyoto

On 5 September, 774 CE, the Emishi stormed Monou castle and the rebellion began. The Emishi counterattacked along a broad front, starting with Monou Castle, destroying the garrison there before going on to destroy a number of forts along a defensive line from east to west established painstakingly over the past generation. Even Taga Castle was not spared. Large Japanese forces were recruited, numbering in the thousands, the largest forces perhaps ten to twenty thousand strong fighting against an Emishi force that numbered at most around three thousand warriors, and at any one place around a thousand. In 776 a huge army of over 20,000 men was sent to attack the Shiwa Emishi, an effort that failed, before the Shiwa Emishi launched a successful counterattack in the Ōu Mountains. In 780, the Emishi attacked the Sendai plain, torching Japanese villages there. The Japanese were in a near panic as they tried to tax and recruit more soldiers from the Bandō.

In the 789 CE Battle of Koromo River (also known as Battle of Sufuse) the Japanese army under Ki no Kosami Seito shōgun was defeated by the Isawa Emishi under their general Aterui. A four thousand-strong army was attacked as they tried to cross the Kitakami River by a force of a thousand Emishi. The imperial army suffered its most stunning defeat, losing a thousand men, many of whom drowned.

In 794, many key Shiwa Emishi, including Isawa no kimi Anushiko of what is now northern Miyagi Prefecture, became allies of the Japanese. This was a stunning reversal to the aspirations of the Emishi who still fought against the Japanese. The Shiwa Emishi were a very powerful group and were able to attack smaller Emishi groups successfully as their leaders were promoted into imperial rank. This isolated one of the most powerful and independent Emishi, the Isawa confederation. The newly appointed shōgun general Sakanoue no Tamuramaro then attacked the Isawa Emishi, relentlessly using soldiers trained in horse archery. The result was a desultory campaign that eventually led to Aterui's surrender in 802. The war was mostly over and many Emishi groups submitted themselves to the imperial government. However, skirmishes still took place, and it was not until 811 that the so-called Thirty-Eight Years' War was over. North of the Kitakami River, the Emishi were still independent, but the large scale threat that they posed ceased with the defeat of the Isawa Emishi in 802.

=== Abe clan, Kiyowara clan and the Northern Fujiwara ===
After their conquest, some Emishi leaders became part of the regional framework of government in the Tōhoku culminating with the Northern Fujiwara regime. This regime and others such as the Abe and Kiyowara were created by local Japanese gōzoku and became regional semi-independent states based on the Emishi and Japanese people. However, even before these emerged, the Emishi people progressively lost their distinct culture and ethnicity as they became minorities.

The Northern Fujiwara were thought to have been Emishi, but there is some doubt as to their lineage, and most likely were descended from local Japanese families who resided in the Tōhoku (unrelated to the Fujiwara of Kyoto). Both the Abe and Kiyowara families were almost certainly of Japanese descent, both of whom represented gōzoku, powerful families who had moved into the provinces of Mutsu and Dewa perhaps during the 9th century, though when they emigrated is not known for certain. They were likely Japanese frontier families who developed regional ties with the descendants of the Emishi fushu, and may have been seen as fushu themselves since they had lived in the region for several generations.

Soon after World War II, mummies of the Northern Fujiwara family in Hiraizumi (the capital city of the Northern Fujiwara), who were thought to have been related to the Ainu, were studied by scientists. However, the researchers concluded that the rulers of Hiraizumi were not related to the ethnic Ainu but more similar to contemporary Japanese of Honshū. This was seen as evidence that the Emishi were not related to the Ainu. This popularized the idea that the Emishi were like other contemporary ethnic Japanese who lived in northeastern Japan, outside of Yamato rule. However, the reason the study of the Northern Fujiwara was done was the assumption that they were Emishi, which they were not. They were descendants of the northern Fujiwara branch from Tsunekiyo and the Abe clan. They took liberties with giving themselves Emishi titles because they had become rulers of the previous Emishi-held lands of the Tohoku.

== Language ==
Emishi
- Extinct: unknown
- Language family: Japonic? Ainuic?

Language codes
- ISO 639-3: None (mis)

The Japanese Dynasty referred to the language spoken by the Emishi as “i-go” (barbarian language), and interpreters were required for communication.

== Ethnic relations ==
=== Emishi–Ainu ===
Language contact between Ainu and Japanese

It is generally accepted that the Emishi were ethnically related to the Ainu people, with both descending from the Jomon people of Northern Japan. The exact relationship between the Emishi and Ainu however remains disputed; they may either share a common "pre-Ainu" ancestor or Emishi tribes are ancestral to the later Ainu via the Satsumon culture. Both Emishi and Ainu were historically referred to as 'Ezo' (though both the words Emishi and Ezo are written using the same kanji, 蝦夷). The Esan culture of northern Honshu is associated with this population and later gave rise to the Satsumon culture which is ancestral to the modern Ainu people of Hokkaido including some Okhotsk culture influence. Unlike the Ainu, the Emishi were horse riders and iron workers, pointing to cultural divergences between early Ainu and the Emishi. While there is evidence for some agriculture (millet and rice), the Emishi were mostly horse riders, hunters, fishers and traders.

The Emishi of Northern Honshu primarily spoke an Ainu-related language. The Matagi are suggested to be the descendants of these Ainu-speakers, which also contributed several toponyms and loanwords, related to geography and certain forest and water animals which they hunted, to the local Japonic-speaking people.

=== Emishi–Izumo/Zuzu Japanese ===
There is some evidence that some of the Emishi spoke a divergent Japonic language, most likely the ancient "Zūzū dialect" (ja) (the ancestor of Tōhoku dialect) and are a different ethnic group from the Ainu and early Yamato. These were likely ethnic Japanese, who resisted the Yamato dynasty's consolidation of political power in early Japan and instead allied themselves with other local tribes. The similarity of the modern Tōhoku dialect and the ancient Izumo dialect in particular supports the notion that some of the Izumo people, who did not submit to Yamato royalty after the establishment of their governance, escaped to the Tōhoku region and became part of the Emishi. Additionally, the evidence of rice cultivation by some of the Emishi supports the theory of a possible Japonic component of their ancestry.

== In popular culture ==
The term "Emishi" is used for the concealed village tribe of the main character Ashitaka in the Hayao Miyazaki animated film Princess Mononoke. The fictional village was a last pocket of Emishi surviving into the Muromachi period (16th century).

== See also ==
- Ezo
- Kombu § Etymology
- Zoku-Jōmon period
- Satsumon culture
- Tsuchigumo
- Origins of the Ainu
